= List of United States Supreme Court cases by the Rehnquist Court =

Supreme Court of the United States
Rehnquist Court
- Burger Court ← → Roberts Court
- September 26, 1986 – September 3, 2005 (18 years, 342 days)
- Seat: Supreme Court Building; Washington, D.C.
- No. of positions: 9
- Rehnquist Court decisions

This is a partial chronological list of cases decided by the United States Supreme Court during the Rehnquist Court, the tenure of Chief Justice William Rehnquist from September 26, 1986, through September 3, 2005. The cases are listed chronologically based on the date that the Supreme Court decided the case.

Case name	Citation	Summary
Colorado v. Connelly	479 U.S. 157 (1986)	the involuntary statement of a criminal suspect uttered during a schizophrenic episode but not coerced by the Government is not precluded from admission in court by the due process clause
Griffith v. Kentucky	479 U.S. 314 (1987)	criminal defendants receive the benefit of new constitutional rules announced before their cases are final on direct review
Commissioner v. Groetzinger	479 U.S. 23 (1987)	addressed the issue of what qualifies as being either a trade or business under Section 162(a) of the Internal Revenue Code
Maryland v. Garrison	480 U.S. 79 (1987)	reasonable belief by police in the validity of a search warrant
Asahi Metal Industry Co. v. Superior Court of California	480 U.S. 102 (1987)	due process, personal jurisdiction, Minimum contacts
Arizona v. Hicks	480 U.S. 321 (1987)	probable cause relating to the plain view doctrine under the Fourth Amendment
United States v. Dunn	480 U.S. 294 (1987)	open fields doctrine
Immigration and Naturalization Service v. Cardoza-Fonseca	480 U.S. 421 (1987)	Asylum applicants must show "well-founded fear" of persecution to establish their eligibility
Keystone Bituminous Coal Ass'n v. Debenedictus	480 U.S. 470 (1987)	substantive due process, the takings clause of the 5th Amendment
O'Connor v. Ortega	480 U.S. 709 (1987)	Fourth Amendment rights of public employees
Tison v. Arizona	481 U.S. 137 (1987)	Felony murder and the death penalty: death penalty is constitutional for major participants in felonies who exhibit extreme indifference to human life, even if someone else personally kills the victim
McCleskey v. Kemp	481 U.S. 279 (1987)	race discrimination and the death penalty
Pennsylvania v. Finley	481 U.S. 551 (1987)	right to counsel in post-conviction proceedings
Saint Francis College v. al-Khazraji	481 U.S. 604 (1987)	persons of Arabian ancestry may make claims for race discrimination under 42 U.S.C. § 1981
Hodel v. Irving	481 U.S. 704 (1987)	Fifth Amendment taking of fractional interests in Native American lands
United States v. Salerno	481 U.S. 739 (1987)	upholding Bail Reform Act of 1984 as not violating Due Process or Excessive Bail clauses
Turner v. Safley	482 U.S. 78 (1987)	free speech and marriage rights of prison inmates
Shearson/American Express Inc. v. McMahon	482 U.S. 220 (1987)	Private actions under the Securities Exchange Act of 1934 are arbitrable
First English Evangelical Lutheran Church v. Los Angeles County	482 U.S. 304 (1987)	substantive due process, temporary taking
O'Lone v. Estate of Shabazz	482 U.S. 342 (1987)	not a violation of the Free Exercise Clause to deprive an inmate of attending a religious service for "legitimate penological interests."
Board of Airport Commissioners of Los Angeles v. Jews for Jesus, Inc.	482 U.S. 569 (1987)	constitutionality of broad free speech prohibitions
Edwards v. Aguillard	482 U.S. 578 (1987)	constitutionality of mandating teaching of creation science in conjunction with evolution
South Dakota v. Dole	483 U.S. 203 (1987)	use of federal funding to encourage changes in state laws—here, raising the drinking age in all states from 18 to 21
Puerto Rico v. Branstad	483 U.S. 219 (1987)	Federal court enforcement of extradition of fugitives
Rankin v. McPherson	483 U.S. 378 (1987)	free speech rights of federal employees
United States v. Stanley	483 U.S. 669 (1987)	soldier's tort claim related to Project MKULTRA barred
Nollan v. California Coastal Commission	483 U.S. 825 (1987)	Fifth Amendment takings clause
Griffin v. Wisconsin	483 U.S. 868 (1987)	Warrantless searches of probationers
Hazelwood v. Kuhlmeier	484 U.S. 260 (1988)	freedom of speech in secondary school newspapers
Hustler Magazine v. Falwell	485 U.S. 46 (1988)	First Amendment; parody, emotional distress
Immigration and Naturalization Service v. Abudu	485 U.S. 94 (1988)	Federal courts of appeals must review denials of motions to reopen immigration proceedings for abuse of discretion
Bowen v. Georgetown University Hospital	488 U.S. 204 (1988)	Agencies may not promulgate retroactive rules unless expressly authorized by Congress
Basic Inc. v. Levinson	485 U.S. 224 (1988)	interpretation of SEC Rule 10b-5, market price manipulation
Lying v. Northwest Indian CPA	485 U.S. 439 (1988)	religious rights of Native American vs. public interest
South Carolina v. Baker	485 U.S. 505 (1988)	Federal requirement that state and local bonds be issued in registered form did not violate the Tenth Amendment
Huddleston v. United States	485 U.S. 681 (1988)	admissibility of prior "bad acts" under the Federal Rules of Evidence
California v. Greenwood	486 U.S. 35 (1988)	4th Amendment; even absent a warrant, the search and seizure of garbage left for collection outside the curtilage of a home
Maynard v. Cartwright	486 U.S. 356 (1988)	cruel and unusual punishment, death penalty
Webster v. Doe	486 U.S. 592 (1988)	ability for CIA firings and hirings to be judicially reviewed
Schweiker v. Chilicky	487 U.S. 412 (1988)	no implied cause of action in the Social Security Act
Frisby v. Schultz	487 U.S. 474 (1988)	First Amendment, privacy, restrictions on abortion protests
Morrison v. Olson	487 U.S. 654 (1988)	independent counsel's office
Thompson v. Oklahoma	487 U.S. 815 (1988)	8th Amendment; cruel and unusual punishment; capital punishment for juveniles under 16
Arizona v. Youngblood	488 U.S. 51 (1988)	state's failure to preserve evidence in a criminal case, absent bad faith, is not a due process violation
Beech Aircraft Corp. v. Rainey	488 U.S. 153 (1988)	Portions of investigatory reports otherwise admissible under Federal Rule of Evidence 803(8)(C) are not inadmissible merely because they state a conclusion or opinion
Mistretta v. United States	488 U.S. 361 (1989)	United States Sentencing Commission, separation of powers
Florida v. Riley	488 U.S. 445 (1989)	aerial surveillance and the Fourth Amendment
City of Richmond v. J.A. Croson Co.	488 U.S. 469 (1989)	Affirmative action, constitutionality of minority business set-aside programs for municipal contracts
Bonito Boats, Inc. v. Thunder Craft Boats, Inc.	489 U.S. 141 (1989)	state anti-plug molding law struck down under preemption doctrine for interfering with federal patent law
DeShaney v. Winnebago County Department of Social Services	489 U.S. 189 (1989)	child welfare department's failure to protect a child from known child abuse does not violate due process
Teague v. Lane	489 U.S. 288 (1989)	new constitutional rules do not generally apply retroactively to cases on collateral review
Blanton v. North Las Vegas	489 U.S. 538 (1989)	Jury trial is unnecessary for petty offenses
Skinner v. Railway Labor Executives Association	489 U.S. 602 (1989)	requiring drug tests for railroad employees is not an unreasonable search under the Fourth Amendment
National Treasury Employees Union v. Von Raab	489 U.S. 656 (1989)	requiring drug tests for customs inspectors is not an unreasonable search under the Fourth Amendment
Board of Estimate of City of New York v. Morris	489 U.S. 688 (1989)	New York City Board of Estimate representation scheme was held to violate Equal Protection Clause; local government districts must conform to "one person, one vote"
Schmuck v. United States	489 U.S. 705 (1989)	Scope of mail fraud statute; proper test for lesser included offense
United States Department of Justice v. Reporters Committee for Freedom of the Press	489 U.S. 749 (1989)	FBI rap sheets may not be disclosed to third parties under the Freedom of Information Act
Davis v. Michigan	489 U.S. 803 (1989)	Intergovernmental immunity prohibits state taxation of federal pensions if state pensions are tax-exempt.
Mississippi Band of Choctaw Indians v. Holyfield	490 U.S. 30 (1989)	held that the Indian Child Welfare Act governed the adoption of Indian children, and clarified the jurisdiction of the tribal court
Graham v. Connor	490 U.S. 386 (1989)	standard for claims for violations of the Fourth Amendment
Rodriguez de Quijas v. Shearson/American Express Inc.	490 U.S. 477 (1989)	Private securities fraud claims under Securities Act of 1933 arbitrable; Wilko v. Swan overruled
Lauro Lines s.r.l. v. Chasser et al.	490 U.S. 495 (1989)	interlocutory appeals; forum selection
Finley v. United States	490 U.S. 545 (1989)	pendent party jurisdiction, later overturned by statute
Wards Cove Packing Co. v. Atonio	490 U.S. 642 (1989)	standard of evidence for disparate impact employment discrimination cases
Hernandez v. Commissioner	490 U.S. 680 (1989)	Scientology courses do not qualify as charitable deductions under the Internal Revenue Code
Community For Creative Non-Violence v. Reid	490 U.S. 730 (1989)	copyright, work for hire
Martin v. Wilks	490 U.S. 755 (1989)	civil procedure in employment affirmative action
Will v. Michigan Dept. of State Police	491 U.S. 58 (1989)	States and their officials acting in their official capacity are not persons under Section 1983
Texas v. Johnson	491 U.S. 397 (1989)	freedom of speech (flag burning)
Ward v. Rock Against Racism	491 U.S. 781 (1989)	freedom of speech, excessive noise
Granfinanciera v. Nordberg	492 U.S. 33 (1989)	Seventh Amendment right to jury trials in bankruptcy proceedings
Penry v. Lynaugh	492 U.S. 302 (1989)	Eighth Amendment permits executing the intellectually disabled; overruled by Atkins v. Virginia
Stanford v. Kentucky	492 U.S. 361 (1989)	Eighth Amendment permits executing offenders who were 16 or 17 years old at the time of the offense; overruled by Roper v. Simmons
Webster v. Reproductive Health Services	492 U.S. 490 (1989)	state funding for abortion rights
County of Allegheny v. ACLU	492 U.S. 573 (1989)	holiday displays and state endorsement of religion
University of Pennsylvania v. EEOC	493 U.S. 182 (1990)	peer review privilege not required by Federal Rules of Evidence or First Amendment
Commissioner v. Indianapolis Power & Light Co.	493 U.S. 203 (1990)	customer deposits constituting taxable income to a utility company
FW/PBS v. City of Dallas	493 U.S. 215 (1990)	regulation of "sexually oriented businesses"
Tafflin v. Levitt	493 U.S. 455 (1990)	state court jurisdiction over civil Racketeer Influenced and Corrupt Organizations Act (RICO) claims
Sullivan v. Zebley	493 U.S. 521 (1990)	determination of SSI benefits for children
Washington v. Harper	494 U.S. 210 (1990)	permissibility of involuntary treatment of psychotic inmates
United States v. Verdugo-Urquidez	494 U.S. 259 (1990)	search and seizure of nonresident alien in foreign country
Chauffeurs, Teamsters, and Helpers Local No. 391 v. Terry	494 U.S. 558 (1990)	scope of 7th Amendment right to jury trial in civil cases
Austin v. Michigan Chamber of Commerce	494 U.S. 652 (1990)	corporate funding of political campaigns
Employment Division v. Smith	494 U.S. 872 (1990)	religious freedom with respect to drug use
Missouri v. Jenkins	495 U.S. 33 (1990)	power of federal courts to order taxation by state or local governments
Osborne v. Ohio	495 U.S. 103 (1990)	states have the power to ban possession of child pornography without violating the First Amendment
Stewart v. Abend	495 U.S. 207 (1990)	rights of the successor of a copyright interest
Grady v. Corbin	495 U.S. 508 (1990)	double jeopardy and subsequent prosecutions
Taylor v. United States	495 U.S. 575 (1990)	definition of "burglary" under certain sentence enhancement provisions of the federal criminal code
Burnham v. Superior Court of California	495 U.S. 604 (1990)	physical presence as a requirement for personal jurisdiction
Duro v. Reina	495 U.S. 676 (1990)	Indian tribes have no jurisdiction over nonmember Indians
Westside School District v. Mergens	496 U.S. 226 (1990)	Bible study clubs in schools
United States v. Eichman	496 U.S. 310 (1990)	freedom of speech (flag burning)
Perpich v. Department of Defense	496 U.S. 334 (1990)	Congressional powers over U.S. National Guard
Eli Lilly & Co. v. Medtronic, Inc.	496 U.S. 661 (1990)	premarketing activity conducted to gain approval of a device under the Federal Food, Drug, and Cosmetic Act is exempt from a finding of patent infringement
Milkovich v. Lorain Journal Co.	497 U.S. 1 (1990)	First Amendment and defamation—no "opinion privilege"
Illinois v. Rodriguez	497 U.S. 177 (1990)	Fourth Amendment, "co-occupant consent rule"
Cruzan v. Director, Missouri Department of Health	497 U.S. 261 (1990)	incompetent persons may not refuse medical treatment under the 14th Amendment
Hodgson v. Minnesota	497 U.S. 417 (1990)	requiring parental notification for abortion is constitutional with a judicial bypass provision
Walton v. Arizona	497 U.S. 639 (1990)	Capital punishment and sentencing procedure, partially overruled by Ring v. Arizona
Maryland v. Craig	497 U.S. 836 (1990)	the right of criminal defendants to confront witnesses
Perry v. Louisiana	498 U.S. 38 (1990)	forcibly medicating a death row inmate with a mental disorder in order to make sure he is competent to be executed is impermissible
Cheek v. United States	498 U.S. 192 (1991)	mistake of law is a valid defense to criminal tax evasion because of mens rea
Board of Ed. of Oklahoma City Public Schools v. Dowell	498 U.S. 237 (1991)	case "hasten[ing] the end of federal court desegregation orders.
Oklahoma Tax Comm'n v. Citizen Band of Potawatomi Tribe of Okla.	498 U.S. 505 (1991)	an Indian tribe was not subject to state sales tax for sales to tribal members
Feist Publications v. Rural Telephone Service Co.	499 U.S. 340 (1991)	minimal quantum of creativity is required for copyright protection
Cottage Savings Ass'n v. Commissioner	499 U.S. 554 (1991)	income tax consequences of mortgage interest exchange, examination of the consequences of the Savings and Loan crisis
Carnival Cruise Lines, Inc. v. Shute	499 U.S. 585 (1991)	enforcement of forum selection clauses
County of Riverside v. McLaughlin	500 U.S. 44 (1991)	suspects arrested without a warrant must be brought into court for a probable cause determination within 48 hours
Rust v. Sullivan	500 U.S. 173 (1991)	government is not required to fund abortion
Hernandez v. New York	500 U.S. 352 (1991)	prosecutor may use peremptory challenge against bilingual Latino jurors based on his doubts about the ability of such jurors to defer to the official translation of Spanish-language testimony
Lehnert v. Ferris Faculty Association	500 U.S. 507 (1991)	unions may compel contributions from nonmembers only for the costs of performing its duties as exclusive bargaining agent
California v. Acevedo	500 U.S. 565 (1991)	police may search a container in a car without a warrant if they have probable cause to believe it contains contraband
Edmonson v. Leesville Concrete Company	500 U.S. 614 (1991)	Batson's prohibition on race-based use of peremptory challenges applies in civil trials
Connecticut v. Doehr	501 U.S. 1 (1991)	Connecticut state statute that authorizes prejudgment attachment of real estate without prior notice or hearing violated the 14th Amendment right to due process
Toibb v. Radloff	501 U.S. 157 (1991)	holding that individual debtors may file for bankruptcy under Chapter 11 of the Bankruptcy Code
McNeil v. Wisconsin	501 U.S. 171 (1991)	differences between the rights secured by the Fifth Amendment and the Sixth Amendment
Florida v. Bostick	501 U.S. 429 (1991)	random bus searches routinely conducted pursuant to passenger's consent
Barnes v. Glen Theatre, Inc.	501 U.S. 560 (1991)	First Amendment and the restriction of nude dancing
Cohen v. Cowles Media Co.	501 U.S. 663 (1991)	First Amendment, freedom of the press
Payne v. Tennessee	501 U.S. 808 (1991)	admissibility of victim impact statements, stare decisis could be disregarded where fairness to victim's rights had priority over the demands of consistency in the common law.
Peretz v. United States	501 U.S. 923 (1991)	role of magistrate judges in jury selection in a felony trial
Harmelin v. Michigan	501 U.S. 957 (1991)	life imprisonment for cocaine possession
Simon & Schuster v. Crime Victims Board	502 U.S. 105 (1991)	holding that New York's Son of Sam law violated the First Amendment
Immigration and Naturalization Service v. Doherty	502 U.S. 314 (1992)	U.S. Attorney General has broad discretion to reopen deportation proceedings
INS v. Elias-Zacarias	502 U.S. 478 (1992)	asylum on account of political opinion must be based on the refugee's political opinion
Lechmere, Inc. v. National Labor Relations Board	502 U.S. 527 (1992)	employer can exclude nonemployee union organizers from private company property
Hudson v. McMillian	503 U.S. 1 (1992)	excessive force against prison inmates, 8th Amendment
INDOPCO, Inc. v. Commissioner	503 U.S. 79 (1992)	Expenditures incurred by a target corporation in the course of a friendly takeover are nondeductible capital expenditures under the Internal Revenue Code
United States v. Felix	503 U.S. 378 (1992)	conviction of a defendant for a crime and for a conspiracy to commit the same offense does not create double jeopardy
United States Department of Commerce v. Montana	503 U.S. 442 (1992)	formula used for reapportionment
Jacobson v. United States	503 U.S. 540 (1992)	entrapment occurs when government creates predisposition to commit offense where it did not exist
Foucha v. Louisiana	504 U.S. 71 (1992)	criteria for the continued involuntary commitment of an individual who had been found not guilty by reason of insanity
Riggins v. Nevada	504 U.S. 127 (1992)	Forced psychiatric medication during trial violated defendant's rights under Sixth and Fourteenth Amendments
Quill Corp. v. North Dakota	504 U.S. 298 (1992)	Requiring out-of-state mail order vendor to collect use tax unconstitutionally burdened interstate commerce
United States v. Thompson-Center Arms Company	504 U.S. 505 (1992)	taxation of firearms
Lujan v. Defenders of Wildlife	504 U.S. 555 (1992)	Standing in a suit to enforce the Endangered Species Act
United States v. Alvarez-Machain	504 U.S. 655 (1992)	application of the Ker-Frisbie doctrine
Morgan v. Illinois	504 U.S. 719 (1992)	A defendant facing the death penalty may challenge for cause a prospective juror who would automatically vote to impose the death penalty in every case
Georgia v. McCollum	505 U.S. 42 (1992)	standard on peremptory challenges from Batson v. Kentucky applied to criminal defendant
Gade v. National Solid Wastes Management Association	505 U.S. 88 (1992)	federal preemption of state labor safety laws
Forsyth County, Georgia v. The Nationalist Movement	505 U.S. 123 (1992)	1st Amendment protection and police protection
New York v. United States	505 U.S. 144 (1992)	the take title provision of the Low-Level Radioactive Waste Policy Amendments Act of 1985 violated the 10th Amendment
Wisconsin Department of Revenue v. William Wrigley, Jr., Co.	505 U.S. 214 (1992)	permissible scope of taxation of out-of-state corporations doing business within a particular state.
R. A. V. v. City of St. Paul	505 U.S. 377 (1992)	fighting words, hate speech
Lee v. Weisman	505 U.S. 577 (1992)	First Amendment, establishment of religion (prayer at high school graduations)
Planned Parenthood v. Casey	505 U.S. 833 (1992)	abortion; reaffirming the "core holding" of Roe v. Wade
United States v. Fordice	505 U.S. 717 (1992)	segregation of colleges and universities
Lucas v. South Carolina Coastal Council	505 U.S. 1003 (1992)	per se rule of takings clause
Soldal v. Cook County	506 U.S. 56 (1992)	Fourth Amendment protects property as well as privacy interests, even absent a search or an arrest (e.g. eviction)
Commissioner v. Soliman	506 U.S. 168 (1993)	"principal place of business" under the Internal Revenue Code
Nixon v. United States	506 U.S. 224 (1993)	judicial impeachment, political question doctrine
Bray v. Alexandria Women's Health Clinic	506 U.S. 263 (1993)	Civil Rights Act of 1871 could not be used to halt blockades of abortion clinics
Herrera v. Collins	506 U.S. 390 (1993)	claim of actual innocence is not grounds for federal habeas corpus relief
Spectrum Sports, Inc. v. McQuillan	506 U.S. 447 (1993)	quantum of proof required for a claim of attempted monopolization under § 2 of the Sherman Antitrust Act
Shaw v. Reno	506 U.S. 630 (1993)	appropriateness of considering race in redistricting
Reno v. Flores	507 U.S. 292 (1993)	procedures for detaining juvenile aliens awaiting deportation
Saudi Arabia v. Nelson	507 U.S. 349 (1993)	jurisdiction in an action based upon a "commercial activity" under the Foreign Sovereign Immunities Act
Cincinnati v. Discovery Network, Inc.	507 U.S. 410 (1993)	First Amendment protections against restrictions on distributing handbills
United States Department of Justice v. Landano	508 U.S. 165 (1993)	Freedom of Information Act and confidentiality
Mertens v. Hewitt Associates	508 U.S. 248 (1993)	Preemption, non-fiduciary liability under ERISA
Wisconsin v. Mitchell	508 U.S. 476 (1993)	enhanced sentencing for hate crimes and the First Amendment
Church of Lukumi Babalu Aye v. City of Hialeah	508 U.S. 520 (1993)	animal cruelty, freedom of religion
Minnesota v. Dickerson	508 U.S. 366 (1993)	seizure of contraband during stop & frisk
Lamb's Chapel v. Center Moriches Union Free School District	508 U.S. 384 (1993)	access by religious groups to public school facilities
South Dakota v. Bourland	508 U.S. 679 (1993)	an Indian tribes hunting and fishing rights were terminated on land the Federal government acquired for a reservoir
Sale v. Haitian Centers Council	509 U.S. 155 (1993)	illegal immigration
Godinez v. Moran	509 U.S. 389 (1993)	competency standard for pleading guilty or waiving the right to counsel is the same as the competency standard for standing trial
Alexander v. United States	509 U.S. 544 (1993)	RICO's forfeiture provision does not violate the First Amendment
Daubert v. Merrell Dow Pharmaceuticals	509 U.S. 579 (1993)	federal judges as gatekeepers for allowing expert witnesses to testify in trials; see also Daubert Standard
Hartford Fire Insurance Co. v. California	509 U.S. 764 (1993)	application of Sherman Antitrust Act to foreign companies
Fogerty v. Fantasy	510 U.S. 517 (1994)	attorney's fees in copyright litigation
Campbell v. Acuff-Rose Music, Inc.	510 U.S. 569 (1994)	copyright, commercial fair use is possible, parody
Oregon Waste Systems, Inc. v. Department of Environmental Quality of Ore.	511 U.S. 93 (1994)	Commerce Clause
J.E.B. v. Alabama ex rel. T.B.	511 U.S. 127 (1994)	peremptory jury challenges based on sex violate equal protection clause
Central Bank of Denver v. First Interstate Bank of Denver	511 U.S. 164 (1994)	private plaintiffs may not maintain an aiding and abetting lawsuit under the Securities Exchange Act of 1934
Landgraf v. USI Film Products	511 U.S. 244 (1994)	retroactive application of statutory amendments effective while cases are pending in court
C&A Carbone, Inc v. Town of Clarkstown	511 U.S. 383 (1994)	Dormant Commerce Clause
Waters v. Churchill	511 U.S. 661 (1994)	Due process rights of public employees in workplace when alleging violations of First Amendment rights
PUD No. 1 of Jefferson County v. Washington Department of Ecology	511 U.S. 700 (1994)	interpretation of §401 of the Clean Water Act
Farmer v. Brennan	511 U.S. 825 (1994)	civil liability under the Eighth Amendment for rape of a transgender prison inmate
Dolan v. City of Tigard	512 U.S. 374 (1994)	Fifth Amendment takings clause
Turner Broadcasting v. Federal Communications Commission	512 U.S. 622 (1994)	upholding must-carry rules against cable television provider's First Amendment challenge
Board of Education of Kiryas Joel Village School District v. Grumet	512 U.S. 687 (1994)	school district coinciding with religious community
Madsen v. Women's Health Center, Inc.	512 U.S. 753 (1994)	first amendment, restrictions on abortion protests
United Mine Workers of America v. Bagwell	512 U.S. 821 (1994)	constitutional limitations on the contempt powers of courts
United States v. Shabani	513 U.S. 10 (1994)	elements of criminal conspiracy (i.e., requirement for an overt act)
United States v. X-Citement Video, Inc.	513 U.S. 64 (1994)	conviction under federal child pornography laws requires proof that the defendant knew the subjects were minors
Schlup v. Delo	513 U.S. 298 (1995)	Standard of proof required for a habeas corpus petition to reopen a case in light of new evidence of innocence
Arizona v. Evans	514 U.S. 1 (1995)	Exclusionary rule does not require suppressing evidence obtained through good-faith reliance on a search warrant that contains a clerical error
Qualitex Co. v. Jacobson Products Co., Inc.	514 U.S. 159 (1995)	color trademarks are appropriate subject matter under the Lanham Act
Plaut v. Spendthrift Farm, Inc.	514 U.S. 211 (1995)	separation of powers and finality of judgments
McIntyre v. Ohio Elections Commission	514 U.S. 334 (1995)	anonymous campaign literature under the First Amendment
United States v. Lopez	514 U.S. 549 (1995)	interstate commerce, gun-free school zones
U.S. Term Limits, Inc. v. Thornton	514 U.S. 779 (1995)	preventing states from enacting term limits to the US House and Senate
First Options v. Kaplan	514 U.S. 938 (1995)	independent judicial review of arbitration clause
Adarand Constructors v. Peña	515 U.S. 200 (1995)	constitutionality of race-based set-asides (strict scrutiny test)
Witte v. United States	515 U.S. 389 (1995)	using "relevant conduct", as defined by the Federal Sentencing Guidelines, at sentencing does not violate double jeopardy principles
Hurley v. Irish-American Gay, Lesbian, and Bisexual Group of Boston	515 U.S. 557 (1995)	First Amendment freedom of association as applied to a private parade organizer seeking to exclude a group inconsistent with its stated message
Florida Bar v. Went For It, Inc.	515 U.S. 618 (1995)	under the commercial speech doctrine of the First Amendment, states may forbid lawyers from directly soliciting personal injury cases for short periods of time after an accident or a disaster
Vernonia School District 47J v. Acton	515 U.S. 646 (1995)	constitutionality of public school drug testing; Fourth and Fourteenth Amendments
Capitol Square Review and Advisory Board v. Pinnette	515 U.S. 753 (1995)	display of religious symbols on government property
Rosenberger v. University of Virginia	515 U.S. 819 (1995)	discrimination by state universities against student religious organizations
Miller v. Johnson	515 U.S. 900 (1995)	racial gerrymandering
Bailey v. United States	516 U.S. 137 (1995)	meaning of "use" in federal statute imposing a five-year prison sentence on anyone who "uses" a firearm during or in relation to a drug crime or a crime of violence
Lotus Dev. Corp. v. Borland Int'l, Inc.	516 U.S. 233 (1995)	scope of software copyrights
Behrens v. Pelletier	516 U.S. 299 (1996)	appeal over ruling on qualified immunity
Hercules, Inc. v. United States	516 U.S. 417 (1996)	liability for producing Agent Orange
Bennis v. Michigan	516 U.S. 442 (1996)	held that innocent owner defense is not constitutionally mandated by Fourteenth Amendment Due Process in cases of civil forfeiture
Seminole Tribe v. Florida	517 U.S. 44 (1996)	Article I and the 11th Amendment
Markman v. Westview Instruments, Inc.	517 U.S. 370 (1996)	claim construction of patents
44 Liquormart, Inc. v. State of Rhode Island	517 U.S. 484 (1996)	restrictions on commercial speech
BMW of North America, Inc. v. Gore	517 U.S. 559 (1996)	whether punitive damages are limited by substantive due process; 14th Amendment
Smiley v. Citibank	517 U.S. 735 (1996)	Credit card late fees can be considered interest and thus not subject to regulation by states other than those of bank's location when charged by national banks.
Romer v. Evans	517 U.S. 620 (1996)	equal protection limitation on forbidding elimination of discrimination on the basis of homosexuality
Jaffee v. Redmond	518 U.S. 1 (1996)	federal evidentiary privilege for medical confidentiality
Gasperini v. Center For Humanities, Inc.	518 U.S. 415 (1996)	7th Amendment, modern interpretation of the Erie doctrine
United States v. Virginia	518 U.S. 515 (1996)	separate but equal gender discrimination
Ohio v. Robinette	519 U.S. 33 (1996)	informing motorists that a traffic stop has ended and the motorist is "free to go" is not required under the Fourth Amendment
Caterpillar, Inc. v. Lewis	519 U.S. 61 (1996)	diversity of citizenship must exist at the time of entry of judgment
M.L.B. v. S.L.J.	519 U.S. 102 (1996)	states must provide transcripts to poor litigants wishing to appeal adverse parental termination decisions
Old Chief v. United States	519 U.S. 172 (1996)	admitting evidence of prior convictions and the danger of "unfair prejudice" under Rule 403 of the Federal Rules of Evidence
Schenck v. Pro-Choice Network of Western New York	519 U.S. 357 (1997)	protesters at abortion clinics
Auer v. Robbins	519 U.S. 452 (1997)	FLSA and overtime pay of police officers
Warner-Jenkinson Company, Inc. v. Hilton Davis Chemical Co.	520 U.S. 17 (1997)	patent law, doctrine of equivalents
Clinton v. Jones	520 U.S. 681 (1997)	Executive privilege and immunity
Agostini v. Felton	521 U.S. 203 (1997)	reexamination of Establishment Clause jurisprudence as it applies schools
Kansas v. Hendricks	521 U.S. 346 (1997)	procedures for involuntary indefinite civil commitment of dangerous persons
City of Boerne v. Flores	521 U.S. 507 (1997)	scope of Congressional enforcement power under § 5 of the 14th Amendment
Washington v. Glucksberg	521 U.S. 702 (1997)	constitutionality of state law forbidding assisted suicide
Vacco v. Quill	521 U.S. 793 (1997)	right to die and assisted suicide
Raines v. Byrd	521 U.S. 811 (1997)	line item veto, legal standing; redirects to Clinton v. City of New York
Printz, Sheriff/Coroner, Ravalli County, Montana v. United States	521 U.S. 898 (1997)	background checks before purchasing handguns
Reno v. American Civil Liberties Union	521 U.S. 844 (1997)	free speech, obscenity, CDA
State Oil Co. v. Khan	522 U.S. 3 (1997)	rule of reason applied to vertical maximum price fixing, overturned Albrecht v. Herald Co.
Alaska v. Native Village of Venetie Tribal Government	522 U.S. 520 (1998)	native rights over tribal lands
NCUA v. First National Bank & Trust	522 U.S. 479 (1998)	intent of Congress w.r.t. the Federal Credit Union Act of 1934
Lexecon Inc. v. Milberg Weiss Bershad Hynes & Lerach	523 U.S. 26 (1998)	pretrial procedures in multi-district litigation
Oncale v. Sundowner Offshore Services	523 U.S. 75 (1998)	applicability of sexual harassment laws to same sex harassment
Quality King Distributors Inc., v. L'anza Research International Inc.	523 U.S. 135 (1998)	application of first-sale doctrine of U.S. copyright law to reimported goods
Almendarez-Torres v. United States	523 U.S. 224 (1998)	prior convictions used to enhance a sentence need not be proved to a jury beyond a reasonable doubt
Feltner v. Columbia Pictures Television, Inc.	523 U.S. 340 (1998)	Seventh Amendment right to jury trial in a copyright infringement case
Breard v. Greene	523 U.S. 371 (1998)	criminal defendant could not raise a defense under the Vienna Convention on Consular Relations on federal habeas corpus review
Miller v. Albright	523 U.S. 420 (1998)	citizenship of a child born outside the United States to a citizen father and an alien mother
Stewart v. Martinez-Villareal	523 U.S. 637 (1998)	proper timing of a claim under Ford v. Wainwright, regarding competency to be executed, in federal habeas proceedings
Kiowa Tribe of Okla. v. Manufacturing Technologies, Inc.	523 U.S. 751 (1998)	an Indian tribe is entitled to sovereign immunity to contract lawsuits, whether made on or off the reservation
County of Sacramento v. Lewis	523 U.S. 833 (1998)	liability of police under 42 U.S.C. § 1983 for causing death during high-speed chases
Federal Election Commission v. Akins	524 U.S. 11 (1998)	standing conferred by statute
United States v. Bajakajian	524 U.S. 321 (1998)	excessive fines
Swidler & Berlin v. United States	524 U.S. 399 (1998)	death of an attorney's client does not terminate the attorney–client privilege
Clinton v. City of New York	524 U.S. 417 (1998)	constitutionality of the Line Item Veto
Eastern Enterprises v. Apfel	524 U.S. 498 (1998)	Substantive Due Process, Economic Liberties
National Endowment for the Arts v. Finley	524 U.S. 569 (1998)	1st amendment, government funding
Bragdon v. Abbott	524 U.S. 624 (1998)	application of the Americans with Disabilities Act of 1990 to an asymptomatic HIV patient
Marquez v. Screen Actors Guild Inc.	525 U.S. 33 (1998)	union shop contracts
Pfaff v. Wells Electronics, Inc.	525 U.S. 55 (1998)	on-sale bar of United States patent law
Knowles v. Iowa	525 U.S. 113 (1998)	search subsequent to a traffic citation without consent
Department of Commerce et al. v. United States House of Representatives et al.	525 U.S. 316 (1999)	Census figures adjusted for undercount based on sampling may not be used for Congressional apportionment
Holloway v. United States	526 U.S. 1 (1999)	federal carjacking statute applies to carjacking crimes committed by defendants with the "conditional intent" of harming drivers who resist the highjacker.
Federal Republic of Germany v. United States	526 U.S. 111 (1999)	application of the Vienna Convention on Consular Relations to death penalty cases
Kumho Tire Co. v. Carmichael	526 U.S. 137 (1999)	non-scientists as expert witnesses in federal trials
Minnesota v. Mille Lacs Band of Chippewa Indians	526 U.S. 172 (1999)	usufructuary rights of Native Americans on certain lands
Jones v. United States	526 U.S. 227 (1999)	subsections of federal carjacking statute define separate crimes subject to Sixth Amendment jury trial requirement
Wyoming v. Houghton	526 U.S. 295 (1999)	warrantless search of a passenger's container capable of holding the object of a search for which there is probable cause is not justified under the automobile exception to the Fourth Amendment
Immigration and Naturalization Service v. Aguirre-Aguirre	526 U.S. 415 (1999)	application of Chevron deference standard to Board of Immigration Appeals actions
Saenz v. Roe	526 U.S. 489 (1999)	welfare benefits to new state citizens and the right to travel
Hunt v. Cromartie	526 U.S. 541 (1999)	gerrymandering
Chicago v. Morales	527 U.S. 41 (1999)	loitering as gang activity
Olmstead v. L.C.	527 U.S. 581 (1999)	undue institutionalization of mental patients violates Americans With Disabilities Act of 1990
Florida Prepaid Postsecondary Education Expense Board v. College Savings Bank	527 U.S. 627 (1999)	sovereign immunity of the States
College Savings Bank v. Florida Prepaid Postsecondary Education Expense Board	527 U.S. 666 (1999)	sovereign immunity of the States
Alden v. Maine	527 U.S. 706 (1999)	sovereign immunity of the States
Kimel v. Florida Board of Regents	528 U.S. 62 (2000)	Congress's enforcement powers under the Fourteenth Amendment do not extend to the abrogation of state sovereign immunity under the Eleventh Amendment where the discrimination is rationally based on age
Illinois v. Wardlow	528 U.S. 119 (2000)	reasonable suspicion for a Terry stop
Reno v. Condon	528 U.S. 141 (2000)	upholding the Driver's Privacy Protection Act of 1994 against a Tenth Amendment challenge
Friends of the Earth, Inc. v. Laidlaw Environmental Services, Inc.	528 U.S. 167 (2000)	standing, mootness, "voluntary cessation"
Nixon v. Shrink Missouri Government PAC	528 U.S. 377 (2000)	campaign contributions to state political parties
Rice v. Cayetano	528 U.S. 495 (2000)	race-based voting restrictions for state government offices
FDA v. Brown & Williamson Tobacco Corp.	529 U.S. 120 (2000)	administrative agency power over an area heavily regulated by Congress
Board of Regents of the University of Wisconsin System v. Southworth	529 U.S. 217 (2000)	compulsory student fees to support political campus groups; 1st Amendment
Christensen v. Harris County	529 U.S. 576 (2000)	county's policy of requiring that employees schedule time off so that they do not accrue time off was not prohibited by the Fair Labor Standards Act
United States v. Morrison	529 U.S. 598 (2000)	limits of Congress's power under the commerce clause
United States v. Playboy Entertainment Group	529 U.S. 803 (2000)	scrambling of adult material on cable channels; 1st Amendment
United States v. Hubbell	530 U.S. 27 (2000)	criminal charges based on subpeonaed documents
Troxel v. Granville	530 U.S. 57 (2000)	fundamental rights of parents to raise their children, third-party visitation rights
Santa Fe Independent School District v. Doe	530 U.S. 290 (2000)	prayer in public schools
Crosby v. National Foreign Trade Council	530 U.S. 363 (2000)	federal preemption of state foreign trade regulation
Dickerson v. United States	530 U.S. 428 (2000)	legislative abrogation of Miranda right
Apprendi v. New Jersey	530 U.S. 466 (2000)	Juries must decide all elements of a crime beyond reasonable doubt
California Democratic Party v. Jones	530 U.S. 567 (2000)	freedom of association and political primary elections
Boy Scouts of America v. Dale	530 U.S. 640 (2000)	right of free association, homosexuality
Stenberg v. Carhart	530 U.S. 914 (2000)	"late term" or "partial birth" abortions
City of Indianapolis v. Edmond	531 U.S. 32 (2000)	use of dogs at random traffic stops
Eastern Associated Coal Corp. v. Mine Workers	531 U.S. 57 (2000)	public policy considerations do not require courts to refuse to enforce an arbitration award ordering an employer to reinstate an employee truck driver who twice tested positive for marijuana
Bush v. Gore	531 U.S. 98 (2000)	vote recounts in presidential election, the only court decision to determine the winner of a presidential election
Brentwood Academy v. Tennessee Secondary School Athletic Ass’n	531 U.S. 288 (2001)	expansion of state action to include "public entwinement"
Board of Trustees of the University of Alabama v. Garrett	531 U.S. 356 (2001)	Eleventh Amendment sovereign immunity and Equal Protection in a disability case
Whitman v. American Trucking Associations, Inc.	531 U.S. 457 (2001)	determining the scope of the EPA's power to set air quality standards
Semtek International Inc. v. Lockheed Martin Corp.	531 U.S. 497 (2001)	res judicata effect of federal judgments in state court
TrafFix Devices, Inc. v. Marketing Displays, Inc.	532 U.S. 23 (2001)	trademark protection for patented designs
Ferguson v. City of Charleston	532 U.S. 67 (2001)	private hospitals that test pregnant women for drugs without their consent and then turn the results over to the police violate the Fourth Amendment
Egelhoff v. Egelhoff	532 U.S. 141 (2001)	preemption of state law by ERISA
Texas v. Cobb	532 U.S. 162 (2001)	Sixth Amendment right to counsel is "offense specific," it does not necessarily extend to offenses that are "factually related" to those that have actually been charged
Easley v. Cromartie	532 U.S. 234 (2001)	racial discrimination, gerrymandering
Alexander v. Sandoval	532 U.S. 275 (2001)	no private right of action for disparate impact under Title VI of Civil Rights Act of 1964
Atwater v. City of Lago Vista	532 U.S. 318 (2001)	constitutionality of arrests for misdemeanors only punishable by fines
C & L Enterprises, Inc. v. Citizen Band Potawatomi Tribe of Okla.	532 U.S. 411 (2001)	Tribal sovereign immunity, waiver by contract to arbitration
Cooper Industries v. Leatherman Tool Group, Inc.	532 U.S. 424 (2001)	The correct standard of review to use on appeals for excessive punitive damages
Rogers v. Tennessee	532 U.S. 451 (2001)	due process, "year and a day rule" in murder cases
United States v. Oakland Cannabis Buyers' Cooperative	532 U.S. 483 (2001)	necessity defense under the Controlled Substances Act for medical use of marijuana
Bartnicki v. Vopper	532 U.S. 514 (2001)	First Amendment and the Electronic Communications Privacy Act
PGA Tour, Inc. v. Martin	532 U.S. 661 (2001)	the Americans with Disabilities Act of 1990 allows reasonable accommodations of handicaps in professional golf
Kyllo v. United States	533 U.S. 27 (2001)	defining 'search' under the 4th Amendment with respect to heat sensors
Good News Club v. Milford Central School	533 U.S. 98 (2001)	free speech, establishment clause
Saucier v. Katz	533 U.S. 194 (2001)	qualified immunity of a police officer to a civil rights case brought through a Bivens action
United States v. Mead Corp.	533 U.S. 218 (2001)	Court declines to extend Chevron doctrine to U.S. Customs Service decisions
Immigration and Naturalization Service v. St. Cyr	533 U.S. 289 (2001)	The Antiterrorism and Effective Death Penalty Act of 1996 and the Illegal Immigration Reform and Immigrant Responsibility Act of 1996, and their effect on habeas corpus petitions
New York Times Co. v. Tasini	533 U.S. 483 (2001)	copyright in databases
Palazzolo v. Rhode Island	533 U.S. 606 (2001)	Fifth Amendment takings clause
Correctional Services Corp. v. Malesko	534 U.S. 61 (2001)	civil rights lawsuits against privately run prisons
Chickasaw Nation v. United States	534 U.S. 84 (2001)	Indian tribes are liable for Federal taxes on gambling revenue
United States v. Knights	534 U.S. 112 (2001)	warrantless searches of probationers
Toyota Motor Manufacturing, Kentucky, Inc. v. Williams	534 U.S. 184 (2002)	meaning of the phrase "substantially impairs" under the Americans with Disabilities Act of 1990
Kansas v. Crane	534 U.S. 407 (2002)	as-applied challenge to Kansas' involuntary indefinite civil commitment of dangerous persons, different result from Kansas v. Hendricks
Owasso Independent School District v. Falvo	534 U.S. 426 (2001)	peer grading does not violate the Family Educational Rights and Privacy Act
Ashcroft v. Free Speech Coalition	535 U.S. 234 (2002)	First Amendment protection for simulated child pornography
Tahoe-Sierra Preservation Council, Inc. v. Tahoe Regional Planning Agency	535 U.S. 302 (2002)	substantive due process, takings clause
City of Los Angeles v. Alameda Books	535 U.S. 425 (2002)	zoning of adult bookstores
Festo Corp. v. Shoketsu Kinzoku Kogyo Kabushiki Co.	535 U.S. 722 (2002)	prosecution history estoppel
McKune v. Lile	536 U.S. 24 (2002)	mandatory treatment for imprisoned sex offenders does not violate the Fifth Amendment privilege against self-incrimination
Watchtower Society v. Village of Stratton	536 U.S. 150 (2002)	door-to-door religious advocacy and the First Amendment
Gonzaga University v. Doe	536 U.S. 273 (2002)	Family Educational Rights and Privacy Act does not create a right which is enforceable under 42 U.S.C. § 1983
Atkins v. Virginia	536 U.S. 304 (2002)	imposing the death penalty on the intellectually disabled; overruling Penry v. Lynaugh
Rush Prudential HMO, Inc. v. Moran	536 U.S. 355 (2002)	no preemption of Illinois insurance statute under ERISA
Utah v. Evans	536 U.S. 452 (2002)	use of statistical sampling in the decennial census
Harris v. United States	536 U.S. 545 (2002)	Sixth Amendment does not require a jury determination of facts necessary to support the minimum punishment for using or carrying a firearm during or in relation to a drug crime or a crime of violence under 18 U.S.C. § 924
Ring v. Arizona	536 U.S. 584 (2002)	Sixth Amendment requires that aggravating factors necessary for eligibility for a death sentence must be found by a jury beyond a reasonable doubt; overruling Walton v. Arizona in part
Zelman v. Simmons-Harris	536 U.S. 639 (2002)	constitutionality of school voucher program
Hope v. Pelzer	536 U.S. 730 (2002)	use of the hitching post in prisons is prohibited by the Eighth Amendment
Republican Party of Minnesota v. White	536 U.S. 765 (2002)	election of state judges, freedom of speech
Board of Education of Independent School District No. 92 of Pottawatomie County v. Earls	536 U.S. 822 (2002)	constitutionality of drug testing of high school students who participate in competitive interscholastic activities
Sattazahn v. Pennsylvania	537 U.S. 101 (2003)	the Double Jeopardy Clause does not forbid seeking the death penalty after an acquittal on first-degree murder charges
Barnhart v. Peabody Coal Co.	537 U.S. 149 (2003)	Social Security benefit assignment for coal industry workers
Eldred v. Ashcroft	537 U.S. 186 (2003)	extending the duration of the term of copyright under U.S. law
Scheidler v. National Organization for Women	537 U.S. 393 (2003)	applying RICO to activities of abortion clinic protesters
Moseley v. V Secret Catalogue, Inc.	537 U.S. 418 (2003)	claims of trademark dilution require proof of actual dilution
United States v. White Mountain Apache Tribe	537 U.S. 465 (2003)	the Federal government has a duty to maintain land held in trust for an Indian tribe
United States v. Navajo Nation	537 U.S. 488 (2003)	compensation for modification a lease of mining rights to land on an Indian reservation
Connecticut Dept. of Public Safety v. Doe	538 U.S. 1 (2003)	holding that Connecticut's sex offender registration statute did not violate due process clause
Ewing v. California	538 U.S. 11 (2003)	California's Three strikes law is not cruel and unusual punishment
Lockyer v. Andrade	538 U.S. 63 (2003)	California's Three strikes law is not cruel and unusual punishment
Smith v. Doe	538 U.S. 84 (2003)	retroactive application of sex offender registry program is not an ex post facto law
Virginia v. Black	538 U.S. 343 (2003)	constitutionality of laws forbidding cross burning for purposes of intimidation
State Farm v. Campbell	538 U.S. 408 (2003)	due process limits on punitive damages
Nevada Department of Human Resources v. Hibbs	538 U.S. 721 (2003)	Family and Medical Leave Act of 1993 validly abrogated state sovereign immunity
Dastar Corp. v. Twentieth Century Fox Film Corp.	539 U.S. 23 (2003)	"reverse passing off" and trademark cannot extend rights to previously copyrighted works now in the public domain
Entergy Louisiana, Inc. v. Louisiana Public Service Commission	539 U.S. 39 (2003)	federal preemption of FERC-approved tariff over state agency order
Sell v. United States	539 U.S. 166 (2003)	Forced psychiatric medication by lower federal courts is permissible under some circumstances
United States v. American Library Association	539 U.S. 194 (2003)	Congressional requirement that libraries install web-filtering software held not to violate First Amendment
Gratz v. Bollinger	539 U.S. 244 (2003)	racial discrimination, affirmative action, equal protection
Grutter v. Bollinger	539 U.S. 306 (2003)	racial discrimination, affirmative action, equal protection
American Insurance Association v. Garamendi	539 U.S. 396 (2003)	California state insurance statute struck down for interfering with Presidential foreign policy
Wiggins v. Smith	539 U.S. 510 (2003)	ineffective assistance of counsel at sentencing
Lawrence v. Texas	539 U.S. 558 (2003)	finding laws restricting sodomy between consenting adults unconstitutional; overruling Bowers v. Hardwick
McConnell v. FEC	540 U.S. 93 (2003)	First Amendment; political speech
Verizon Communications v. Law Offices of Curtis V. Trinko, LLP	540 U.S. 398 (2004)	the Sherman Antitrust Act and requirements of telecommunications companies under the Telecommunications Act of 1996
Illinois v. Lidster	540 U.S. 419 (2004)	accident investigation checkpoints do not violate the Fourth Amendment
Fellers v. United States	540 U.S. 519 (2004)	once judicial proceedings have been initiated against a defendant, police officers cannot elicit information from the defendant without the defendant's counsel present
Doe v. Chao	540 U.S. 614 (2004)	governmental violation of privacy rights
Locke v. Davey	540 U.S. 712 (2004)	a religion clauses case upholding a Washington state scholarship program which excluded funding devotional studies.
Crawford v. Washington	541 U.S. 36 (2004)	prior testimony exception to hearsay in criminal trials, Sixth Amendment right to confront witnesses; abrogating Ohio v. Roberts
National Archives and Records Administration v. Favish	541 U.S. 157 (2004)	availability of death-scene images under the Freedom of Information Act over the objection of family members; investigation into the suicide of Vince Foster
United States v. Flores-Montano	541 U.S. 149 (2004)	reasonableness of removing a gas tank from a vehicle crossing the border under the Fourth Amendment
Vieth v. Jubelirer	541 U.S. 267 (2004)	justiciability of suit to enjoin gerrymandering
Tennessee v. Lane	541 U.S. 509 (2004)	Congress's power under the 14th amendment, section 5; Americans With Disabilities Act of 1990
Nelson v. Campbell	541 U.S. 637 (2004)	challenging lethal injection protocols under 42 U.S.C. § 1983
Republic of Austria v. Altmann	541 U.S. 677 (2004)	retroactive application of the Foreign Sovereign Immunities Act
Central Laborers' Pension Fund v. Heinz	541 U.S. 739 (2004)	an ambiguity in the Employee Retirement Income Security Act
Department of Transportation v. Public Citizen	541 U.S. 752 (2004)	Presidential foreign affairs and foreign trade actions
Elk Grove Unified School District v. Newdow	542 U.S. 1 (2004)	validity of “under God” in Pledge of Allegiance; standing to bring suit on another’s behalf
United States v. Dominguez Benitez	542 U.S. 74 (2004)	appellate review standard for violations of Rule 11 of the Federal Rules of Criminal Procedure governing the taking of guilty pleas
Hiibel v. Sixth Judicial District Court of Nevada	542 U.S. 177 (2004)	constitutionality of state law requiring citizens to identify themselves to police
Aetna Health Inc. v. Davila	542 U.S. 200 (2004)	ERISA's effect on federal jurisdiction of cases involving utilization review
Intel Corp. v. Advanced Micro Devices, Inc.	542 U.S. 241 (2004)	foreign tribunals
Blakely v. Washington	542 U.S. 296 (2004)	jury must find all elements of a criminal sentence beyond a reasonable doubt
Schriro v. Summerlin	542 U.S. 348 (2004)	retroactively applying the rule set in Ring v. Arizona that a jury must find the aggravating factors in a capital murder case
Rumsfeld v. Padilla	542 U.S. 426 (2004)	detention of American citizens
Rasul v. Bush	542 U.S. 466 (2004)	jurisdiction over foreign nationals detained in Guantanamo Bay
Hamdi v. Rumsfeld	542 U.S. 507 (2004)	detention of American citizens
Missouri v. Seibert	542 U.S. 600 (2004)	Missouri's practice of interrogating suspects without reading them a Miranda warning, then reading them the warning and asking them to repeat their confession is unconstitutional
Leocal v. Ashcroft	543 U.S. 1 (2004)	DUI is not a "crime of violence" requiring deportation of an alien
Koons Buick, Inc. v. Nigh	543 U.S. 50 (2004)	Truth in Lending Act imposes a $1000 limit on statutory damages for violations of the Act involving personal-property loans.
KP Permanent Make-Up, Inc. v. Lasting Impression I, Inc.	543 U.S. 111 (2004)	fair use defense to a trademark infringement action does not require proof that there is no likelihood of confusing the marks
United States v. Booker	543 U.S. 220 (2005)	applying Blakely v. Washington to the Federal Sentencing Guidelines
Clark v. Martinez	543 U.S. 371 (2005)	detention of aliens awaiting deportation
Illinois v. Caballes	543 U.S. 405 (2005)	4th Amendment search and seizure
Commissioner v. Banks	543 U.S. 426 (2005)	Whether or not the portion of a money judgment or settlement paid to a taxpayer's attorney under a contingent-fee agreement is income to the taxpayer for federal income tax purposes.
Johnson v. California	543 U.S. 499 (2005)	proper standard for reviewing constitutional race-discrimination claim in sorting prison inmates
Roper v. Simmons	543 U.S. 551 (2005)	imposing the death penalty on juvenile murderers; overruling Stanford v. Kentucky
Cherokee Nation of Okla. v. Leavitt	543 U.S. 631 (2005)	a Federal contract with an Indian tribe is binding, even if Congress did not appropriate funds
Tenet v. Doe	544 U.S. 1 (2005)	enforceability of contracts between the government and spies (undercover CIA agents)
Shepard v. United States	544 U.S. 13 (2005)	proving prior convictions obtained through guilty pleas under Taylor v. United States
City of Sherrill v. Oneida Indian Nation of N. Y.	544 U.S. 197 (2005)	the repurchase of tribal land by an Indian tribe does not restore tribal sovereignty to the land
Exxon Mobil Corp. v. Saudi Basic Industries Corp.	544 U.S. 280 (2005)	state court decisions and the application of the Rooker-Feldman doctrine
Dura Pharmaceuticals, Inc. v. Broudo	544 U.S. 336 (2005)	standard for pleading loss causation in a securities fraud claim
Small v. United States	544 U.S. 385 (2005)	resolution of split appeals court decisions on inclusion of foreign courts in the term "any court"
Granholm v. Heald	544 U.S. 460 (2005)	interstate shipment of wine under the Dormant Commerce Clause
Deck v. Missouri	544 U.S. 622 (2005)	shackling a defendant during the penalty phase of a capital murder trial
Arthur Andersen LLP v. United States	544 U.S. 696 (2005)	legality of document destruction in the face of likely government investigation
Cutter v. Wilkinson	544 U.S. 709 (2005)	religious freedom for prison inmates
Tory v. Cochran	544 U.S. 734 (2005)	defamation, enjoinment of speech; continuity of injunction after death
Gonzales v. Raich	545 U.S. 1 (2005)	legitimacy of using marijuana as a medicine, and power of the federal government to regulate intrastate activities
Spector v. Norwegian Cruise Line Ltd.	545 U.S. 119 (2005)	applicability of the Americans with Disabilities Act of 1990 to foreign-held companies
Merck KGaA v. Integra Lifesciences I, Ltd.	545 U.S. 193 (2005)	applicability of patents in preclinical studies
Wilkinson v. Austin	545 U.S. 209 (2005)	due process requirements for placing prisoners in Supermax prisons
Miller-El v. Dretke	545 U.S. 231 (2005)	clarification of Batson v. Kentucky standard for peremptory challenges
Kelo v. City of New London	545 U.S. 469 (2005)	eminent domain; takings of private property for private development
Van Orden v. Perry	545 U.S. 677 (2005)	legality of a Ten Commandments display
Town of Castle Rock v. Gonzales	545 U.S. 748 (2005)	liability of police departments under 42 U.S.C. § 1983 for failing to respond to domestic violence calls
McCreary County v. ACLU of Kentucky	545 U.S. 844 (2005)	constitutionality of a Ten Commandments display; potential reformulation of the Lemon test
MGM Studios, Inc. v. Grokster, Ltd.	545 U.S. 913 (2005)	Copyright infringement in P2P file-sharing; re-examination of Sony Corp. v. Universal City Studios
National Cable and Telecomm. Assn v. Brand X Internet Services	545 U.S. 967 (2005)	allowing small internet service providers to lease bandwidth from privately owned coaxial cable lines
