= Hernandez v. Commissioner =

- Supreme Court of the United States

Argued November 28, 1988 Decided June 5, 1989
- Full case name: Robert L. Hernandez v. Commissioner of Internal Revenue
- Citations: 490 U.S. 680 (more) 109 S.Ct. 2136; 104 L. Ed. 2d 766; 1989 U.S. LEXIS 2773

Case history
- Prior: Hernandez v. Commissioner, 819 F.2d 1212 (1st Cir. 1987); cert. granted, 485 U.S. 1005 (1988).; Graham v. Commissioner, 83 T.C. 575 (1984), affirmed, 822 F.2d 844 (9th Cir. 1987); cert. granted, 485 U.S. 1022 (1988).

Holding
- 1) The payments for auditing or training sessions are not deductible "contribution[s] or gift[s]" under Internal Revenue Code §170 because the Court found no supporting Congressional intent for the petitioners argument. 2) Denying the deduction does not violate the Establishment Clause because §170 is non-discriminatory and meets all three Lemon criteria. 3) Denying the deduction does not violate the Free Exercise Clause because the government interest in a "maintaining a sound tax system" overcomes the burden of having less money to access auditing and training sessions (which does not stem from a doctrinal obligation).

Court membership
- Chief Justice William Rehnquist Associate Justices William J. Brennan Jr. · Byron White; Thurgood Marshall · Harry Blackmun; John P. Stevens · Sandra Day O'Connor; Antonin Scalia · Anthony Kennedy

Case opinions
- Majority: Marshall, joined by Rehnquist, White, Blackmun, Stevens
- Dissent: O'Connor, joined by Scalia
- Brennan, Kennedy took no part in the consideration or decision of the case.

Laws applied
- Statutory argument 26 U.S.C. § 170; Constitutional claims based on the Establishment Clause and Free Exercise Clause of the First Amendment

Hernandez v. Commissioner, 490 U.S. 680 (1989), is a decision of the United States Supreme Court relating to the Internal Revenue Code § 170 charitable contribution deduction.

== Facts ==
The Church of Scientology, founded by L. Ron Hubbard, teaches that an immortal spiritual being exists inside everyone. The Church uses the "auditing" practice to help interested people become aware of this spiritual being. The Church uses the "training" courses to help participants to become auditors. The Church charges for those services due to the belief that, any time a person receives something, that person must pay something back in return. The income generated by those services constitutes the Church's primary source of income.

The taxpayers made payments to branch churches in exchange for auditing or training services. The taxpayers tried to deduct these payments on their Federal Income Tax returns under the charitable contribution deduction.

== Issue ==
Whether taxpayers may deduct payments to the Church of Scientology for auditing and training as a charitable contribution under IRC §170?

== Holding ==
The payments for auditing or training sessions do not satisfy the "contribution[s] or gift[s]" inquiry necessary for deductibility under IRC §170 because it amounted to a quid pro quo for the taxpayer. In other words, the taxpayer received a benefit in consideration for his contribution.

== Reasoning ==
Justice Thurgood Marshall began the majority opinion with a discussion of the legislative history of the "contribution or gift" limitation as described in IRC §170(c). When the tax bill was enacted in 1954, Congress distinguished between unrequited payments and payments made in return for goods and services. Specifically, the gift characterization was deemed to only apply "if there were no expectation of any quid pro quo..." In later decisions, the quid pro quo analysis was expanded to also apply to charitable contributions.

Hernandez and other taxpayers argued that the quid pro quo determination did not apply to this situation because the benefit they were receiving through the auditing and training was purely religious. The Court emphasized that IRC §170(c) clearly states that donations to religious organizations are only deductible if they are contributions or gifts, regardless of the expectations underlying the payments. The Court hesitated to broaden the scope of the deduction to any payments designed to achieve a religious benefit, since that could open the door to deductions such as those for parochial school tuition or payments to church-affiliated hospitals. The Court noted that refraining from characterizing the services provided by religious institutions prevented the government - the IRS and court system - from effectively monitoring the practices of a church.

== Dissent ==
Justice O'Connor and Justice Scalia disagreed with the majority opinion. The opinion noted that there have been no instances where the IRS has previously denied deductibility on a quid pro quo basis even though the benefit was entirely spiritual or religious. They give lots of examples of when the IRS let prior things not violate the quid quo pro test. Because of the difficulty in putting a dollar value on intangible religious benefits, the Government had, up until this case, chosen to ignore the quid pro quo argument and allow these deductions.

== See also ==
- List of United States Supreme Court cases, volume 490
- List of United States Supreme Court cases
- Lists of United States Supreme Court cases by volume
- List of United States Supreme Court cases by the Rehnquist Court
- Scientology and the legal system
