= Lyng v. Automobile Workers =

- Supreme Court of the United States

Decided March 23, 1988
- Full case name: Lyng v. Automobile Workers
- Citations: 485 U.S. 360 (more)

Holding
- Freedom of Association under the First Amendment does not create a right to strike.

Court membership
- Chief Justice William Rehnquist Associate Justices William J. Brennan Jr. · Byron White; Thurgood Marshall · Harry Blackmun; John P. Stevens · Sandra Day O'Connor; Antonin Scalia · Anthony Kennedy

Case opinions
- Majority: White, joined by Rehnquist, Stevens, O'Connor, Scalia
- Dissent: Marshall, joined by Brennan, Blackmun
- Kennedy took no part in the consideration or decision of the case.

Lyng v. Automobile Workers, 485 U.S. 360 (1988), was a United States Supreme Court case in which the court held that Freedom of Association under the First Amendment does not create a right to strike.
