= Hernandez v. New York =

- Supreme Court of the United States

Argued February 25, 1991 Decided May 28, 1991
- Full case name: Hernandez v. New York
- Citations: 500 U.S. 352 (more) 111 S. Ct. 1859; 114 L. Ed. 2d 395; 1991 U.S. LEXIS 2913

Holding
- A prosecutor's peremptory challenges of Spanish-speaking Latino jurors based on his doubts about the ability of such jurors to defer to the official translation of Spanish-language testimony did not violate the Equal Protection Clause.

Court membership
- Chief Justice William Rehnquist Associate Justices Byron White · Thurgood Marshall; Harry Blackmun · John P. Stevens; Sandra Day O'Connor · Antonin Scalia; Anthony Kennedy · David Souter

Case opinions
- Plurality: Kennedy, joined by Rehnquist, White, Souter
- Concurrence: O'Connor (in judgment), joined by Scalia
- Dissent: Blackmun
- Dissent: Stevens, joined by Marshall

Laws applied
- U.S. Const. amend. XIV

Hernandez v. New York, 500 U.S. 352 (1991), was a decision by the United States Supreme Court which held that a prosecutor may dismiss jurors who are bilingual in Spanish and English from juries that will consider Spanish-language testimony.

Peremptory challenges are used to remove jurors thought to be undesirable for virtually any reason by either side in a court case. However, in Batson v. Kentucky (1986), the Supreme Court ruled that peremptory challenges may not be used to remove jurors because of their race. In Hernandez, the Supreme Court needed to decide whether the peremptory exclusion of two Hispanic jurors was tantamount to exclusion because of race—and therefore violated the Equal Protection Clause of the United States Constitution. Hernandez is recognized as expanding a Batson challenge to a peremptory strike based on a juror's ethnicity.

== Procedural history ==
Dinosio Hernandez was convicted by a jury of attempted murder on January 30, 1987, in the New York Supreme Court. He appealed his conviction, claiming that under the U.S. Supreme Court's recent decision in Batson v. Kentucky, the prosecutor unconstitutionally used peremptory strikes against jury panel members who had Hispanic last names. On appeal, the court found that the prosecutor had challenged only the three potential jurors with Hispanic surnames. However, the appellate court found that the prosecutor had a nondiscriminatory reason for the challenge: the stricken jurors either had a relative prosecuted by the district attorney's office, or they spoke Spanish and might not accept the translated testimony as final.

Hernandez proceeded with his Batson claim and appealed to the New York Court of Appeals (the state's highest court of appeals). This court agreed with the appellate court that Hernandez made a prima facie (lit. 'at first sight') case of discrimination. The court did not find that striking a juror based on their language alone was a reversible error, because it was a "legitimate neutral ground" for the prosecutor to be concerned about the Spanish-speaking jurors' fidelity to a translated court record. The majority noted that the trial judge had been present during the entirety of the questioning and had been satisfied with the prosecutor's actions, as the stricken jurors' body language had signaled doubt.

Judge Judith Kaye wrote the dissent, criticizing the majority for the diminished protections of Batson for New York, as well as for deciding the case on federal and not state law. Rather than allow Batson's contours to be defined over decades of litigation, Kaye argued that deciding the matter on state law would allow clearer protections sooner for New York residents. On the merits, Kaye believed that too much deference was provided to the trial court's decision, and she was concerned that while the prosecutor had expressed an interest in removing Spanish speakers because of the interpreter, there was no indication that any non-Latino jurors had been asked if they spoke Spanish as well.

The Supreme Court granted a writ of certiorari (seeking judicial review) to determine if a Latino juror struck from jury service because of their Spanish language in a court-translated proceeding violated a defendant's Batson protections.

== Arguments at the Supreme Court ==
=== Amicus curiae ===
The Mexican American Legal Defense and Education Fund (MALDEF) filed an amicus curiae brief on behalf of Hernandez. MALDEF's argument focused on the wide usage of Spanish by Hispanics, as well as sociolinguistic evidence that supported Hispanics as living in a world where they are constantly required to switch between Spanish and English, with no ability to turn off the ability to speak either language. The argument foresaw that Hispanic jurors would become an "endangered species" if they were presumed to be biased, on the basis of a common attribute.

=== Oral argument ===
During oral argument, Hernandez argued that it is a per se Batson violation to discriminate on the basis of language. Hernandez believed that every bilingual juror would express the same hesitation as did the struck jurors in his case, because of their language ability. The court was concerned with issues of drawing lines potentially for multiple dialects or languages of a given foreign country, as well as whether a prosecutor could ever use a peremptory strike against a bilingual juror.

New York argued that Hernandez's position was opposed to Supreme Court jurisprudence for three main reasons: it used a juror's answer as proof of a prosecutor's intent to discriminate; it prevented individualized assessment of jurors in favor of group stereotypes; and it would create no ability for prosecutors to excuse certain jurors.

=== Plurality decision ===
Justice Kennedy wrote the plurality opinion. After outlining the facts of the case and its procedural history, the court moved on to the court's jurisprudence on Batson. It reiterated Batson's three-step process:

1. First, a defendant must make a prima facie case of racial discrimination;
2. Second, if such a case is made, the burden shifts to the prosecutor to make a race-neutral showing for striking the jurors; and
3. Finally, the trial judge makes a determination whether the defendant's claim stands.

Even though Hernandez did not make a prima facie showing before the prosecutor presented the race-neutral reasoning, the court found that this did not impact the analysis because it rested with the trial judge's determination.

The court side-stepped Hernandez's argument on the correlation between Spanish-speaking ability and ethnicity, because of the additional factors that the prosecutor articulated in his reasons for striking the two Latino jurors. Kennedy argued that even assuming that all bilingual speakers would hesitate, it did not fail a race-neutral analysis because it did not show an intent by the prosecutor to remove all bilingual Latinos, and a negative impact did not violate race neutrality.

The trial court's decision was afforded a high level of deference under Batson, and the court assumed that the trial judge took case-specific factors into account in deciding to accept the prosecutor's justification: the high concentration of Spanish speakers in the local population, Spanish as the predominant language for many in that region, the ethnic backgrounds of the parties and witnesses, and the prosecutor's swift justification. This level of deference was based on a trial judge's ability to decide credibility questions that cannot be reviewed solely through the record on the appeal. The plurality found no reason that the trial judge's decision presented a clear error, and found that it was a permissible view given the evidence.

In a closing dicta discussion, the plurality cited linguistic studies noting the complexity of language and bilingual distinctions. The plurality further counseled that excluding bilingual people is unwise and may be unconstitutional under a different set of facts. Specifically, Kennedy outlined that in creating a blanket policy regardless of a case's specific facts or for particular ethnic groups in certain communities, language could be treated similarly to skin color under Batson. However, this was not the case.

=== Concurrence ===
Justices O'Connor and Scalia concurred in the plurality's judgment. O'Connor agreed with the plurality's deference to the trial court's decision, but she believed that it went too far in deciding the constitutional question. After outlining the court's jurisprudence under Batson and Washington v. Davis, O'Connor limited analysis of the Equal Protection Clause for racial discrimination to race only. "No matter how closely tied or significantly correlated to race... [it] does not implicate the Equal Protection Clause unless it is based on race." O'Connor reasoned that if a trial judge accepted a prosecutor's nonracial explanation, then there was nothing more for an appeals court to decide on a Batson claim.

=== Dissent ===
Justice Stevens dissented, and Justice Marshall joined the dissent. Under Batson, Stevens argued that a prosecutor who attempts to rebut a prima facie showing of discrimination must do so with "'legitimate reasons' that are 'related to the particular case to be tried.'" Stevens found the court erred by allowing an illegitimate explanation of the prosecutor's actions that went to the heart of Batson's protections for the Fourteenth Amendment. Furthermore, Stevens found that the prosecutor's justification would disproportionately affect Spanish-speaking jurors; alternatives were available to address the prosecutor's concerns; and his reasoning should be viewed skeptically because he did not use a for-cause challenge.

Justice Blackmun dissented in a separate statement, agreeing with Stevens' dissent on the prosecutor's insufficient explanation for dispelling an inference of racial animus.

== Criticism of the decision ==
The decision received immediate attention in a New York Times article that broke down the arguments and the court's reasoning. Law professors were also skeptical of the decision and its implications. Professor Juan Perea argued that the interconnection between race and language was not properly addressed, and that the Supreme Court should have found the prosecutor's peremptory strikes not to be race-neutral. Professor Deborah Ramirez highlighted that this decision could permit bilingual people to be systematically removed from juries, along with the pervasive impact that this might have on Latinos. Professor Alfredo Mirandé furthered the research on "bilingualism as an immutable characteristic" under the Fourteenth Amendment's Equal Protection Doctrine; in addition, he noted that lower courts had expanded the Supreme Court's reasoning to allow peremptory challenges when a juror understood a foreign language when a translation was disputed during a trial.

The Supreme Court has not revisited the question of potential discrimination toward bilingual or multilingual jurors, which has created confusion for lower courts. An examination of the twenty years after Hernandez v. New York in California courts found the case's reasoning to be "an arbitrary and flawed tool", but California courts were hesitant to rule contrarily. This situation has left open the question of how the court would rule if non-Latinos who spoke Spanish were allowed to remain on a jury, while Spanish-speaking Latinos were struck because of their language ability. Professor Mirandé noted that Latinos across the board were hurt: monolingual Spanish speakers were barred for lacking English, while bilingual jurors were struck for knowing too much Spanish. He suggested instead that bilingual Spanish speakers should be required by the court to play an important role in court translations. Another commentator has argued that the courts should embrace more bilingualism because of the benefits that it provides to the legal system, as the Hernandez dissent discussed.

== Aftermath of the decision ==
Five years later, in Purkett v. Elem, the Supreme Court cited Hernandez as outlining the Batson steps and criteria for meeting the "legitimate reason" standard for a prosecutor to strike a juror. With the Supreme Court limiting the protections of Batson, states may be able to safeguard these protections on a state constitutional basis. Today, the case is understood to expand the Equal Protection Clause's protections of an unbiased jury as applying to ethnic origin alongside Batson's protections for race.

In a habeas corpus (challenge of unlawful detention) case, the United States Court of Appeals for the Third Circuit acknowledged the close connection between language and race, noting that Kennedy remarked how language can lead to discrimination. However, this court found that language did not meet the same "heightened" or "strict" scrutiny that race and gender did under the equal protection doctrine. The Third Circuit did outline that Latino jurors could not be struck because of the theoretical use of Spanish, and it placed a greater burden on trial judges to be "sensitive to the potential use of language-based peremptories for discriminatory purposes".

== See also ==
- List of United States Supreme Court cases, volume 500
- List of United States Supreme Court cases
- Lists of United States Supreme Court cases by volume
- List of United States Supreme Court cases by the Rehnquist Court
- Hernandez v. Texas (1954)
