= Nichols v. United States (1994) =

- Supreme Court of the United States

Argued January 10, 1994 Decided June 6, 1994
- Full case name: Nichols v. United States
- Citations: 511 U.S. 738 (more)

Holding
- A previous conviction for a misdemeanor offense where no counsel was present can be used to enhance a sentence for an offender's subsequent conviction as long as the misdemeanor did not result in imprisonment.

Court membership
- Chief Justice William Rehnquist Associate Justices Harry Blackmun · John P. Stevens; Sandra Day O'Connor · Antonin Scalia; Anthony Kennedy · David Souter; Clarence Thomas · Ruth Bader Ginsburg

Case opinions
- Majority: Rehnquist, joined by O'Connor, Scalia, Kennedy, Thomas
- Concurrence: Souter (in judgment)
- Dissent: Blackmun, joined by Stevens, Ginsburg

Laws applied
- U.S. Const. amend. VI, XIV

Nichols v. United States, 511 U.S. 738 (1994), was a United States Supreme Court case that ruled that an uncounseled misdemeanor conviction, which resulted in a punishment other than imprisonment, can be used to enhance a sentence for a subsequent offense.
