= Central Bank of Denver, N.A. v. First Interstate Bank of Denver, N.A. =

Central Bank v. First Interstate Bank
- Supreme Court of the United States

Argued November 30, 1993 Decided April 19, 1994
- Full case name: Central Bank of Denver, N.A., Petitioner v. First Interstate Bank of Denver, N.A. and Jack K. Naber
- Citations: 511 U.S. 164 (more) 114 S. Ct. 1439; 128 L. Ed. 2d 119; 62 U.S.L.W. 4230

Case history
- Prior: Certiorari to the United States Court of Appeals for the Tenth Circuit

Holding
- A private plaintiff may not maintain an aiding and abetting suit under Section 10(b) of the Securities Exchange Act. Tenth Circuit reversed.

Court membership
- Chief Justice William Rehnquist Associate Justices Harry Blackmun · John P. Stevens; Sandra Day O'Connor · Antonin Scalia; Anthony Kennedy · David Souter; Clarence Thomas · Ruth Bader Ginsburg

Case opinions
- Majority: Kennedy, joined by Rehnquist, O'Connor, Scalia, Thomas
- Dissent: Stevens, joined by Blackmun, Souter, Ginsburg

Laws applied
- Section 10(b) of Securities Exchange Act.

Central Bank of Denver v. First Interstate Bank of Denver, 511 U.S. 164 (1994), was a decision by the United States Supreme Court, which held private plaintiffs may not maintain aiding and abetting suits under Securities Exchange Act § 10(b).

The majority opinion in the case established that liability did not extend to "aiders or abettors" that participate in misstatements or omissions in connection with the sale of securities. The Supreme Court held that "private civil liability under Rule 10b-5 does not extend to those who do not engage in a manipulative or deceptive practice but who aid and abet such a violation of 10(b)." This distinguished between the primary liability of violators of Rule 10b-5 and non-primary defendants, who had not directly deceived investors. This was a more literal reading than hitherto of Section 10(b) of the Securities Exchange Act of 1934 and the Securities and Exchange Commission's Rule 10b-5, which prohibit fraud or deceit in connection with the purchase or sale of securities.

The Supreme Court's ruling reversed a long history of court decisions and SEC enforcement actions where aiders and abettors, often banks, accountants, trustees, and attorneys, were found liable under Rule 10b-5. The case makes the distinction between primary violators, who directly misstate or omit material facts that are relied upon by investors, and aiders and abettors. According to the court: "A plaintiff must show reliance on the defendant's misstatement or omission to recover under 10b-5. Basic Inc. v. Levinson, supra, at 243. Were we to allow the aiding and abetting action proposed in this case, the defendant could be liable without any showing that the plaintiff relied upon the aider and abettor's statement or actions. . . .". When investors relied on such statements or actions, the court extends Rule 10b-5 liability to these secondary participants. The Court stated that "any person or entity, including a lawyer, accountant, or bank, who employs a manipulative device or makes a material misstatement (or omission) on which a purchaser or seller of securities relies may be liable as a primary violator under 10b-5. . .."

== See also ==
- List of United States Supreme Court cases, volume 511
- List of United States Supreme Court cases
- Lists of United States Supreme Court cases by volume
- List of United States Supreme Court cases by the Rehnquist Court
- Stoneridge Investment Partners v. Scientific-Atlanta (2008)
