= Hess v. Port Authority Trans-Hudson Corp. =

- Supreme Court of the United States

Argued October 3, 1994 Decided November 14, 1994
- Full case name: Hess v. Port Authority Trans-Hudson Corporation
- Citations: 513 U.S. 30 (more)

Holding
- The Port Authority of New York and New Jersey is not an "arm of the state" for purposes of the Eleventh Amendment.

Court membership
- Chief Justice William Rehnquist Associate Justices John P. Stevens · Sandra Day O'Connor; Antonin Scalia · Anthony Kennedy; David Souter · Clarence Thomas; Ruth Bader Ginsburg · Stephen Breyer

Case opinions
- Majority: Ginsburg, joined by Stevens, Kennedy, Souter, Breyer
- Concurrence: Stevens
- Dissent: O'Connor, joined by Rehnquist, Scalia, Thomas

Hess v. Port Authority Trans-Hudson Corp., 513 U.S. 30 (1994), was a United States Supreme Court case regarding the nature of "arms of the state" that are entitled to sovereign immunity under the Eleventh Amendment.

The Eleventh Amendment bars suits which seek either damages or injunctive relief against a state, an "arm of the state", its instrumentalities, or its agencies. In Hess, the Court considered what constitutes an "arm of the state". The case arose from a circuit split where the Second and Third Circuits issued conflicting ruling on whether the Port Authority of New York and New Jersey was entitled to sovereign immunity.

In an opinion by Justice Ruth Bader Ginsburg, the Court held that the Port Authority is not an "arm of the state" for purposes of the Eleventh Amendment. The Court reasoned that a judgment against the Port Authority would not be paid through by the state treaty of either New York or New Jersey.
