= Ferris Alexander trial =

The Ferris Alexander trial was a 1990 trial of Minnesota pornographic book store owner and theater owner Ferris Alexander, his wife, son, and bookkeeper for racketeering and obscenity. Alexander was convicted in May 1990 of 25 counts of racketeering, obscenity and tax fraud and was sentenced to six years in prison and his properties were seized. Alexander's bookkeeper Wanda Magnuson, was convicted of 15 counts of tax conspiracy and racketeering, but wife, Dolores, and son, Jeffrey, were acquitted of similar charges.

Alexander had been called the "reputed pornography king of Minnesota", owner of a "multimillion dollar empire", who owned stores in the Twin Cities, Duluth, Winona and Rochester. He was "the first person in the United States to be sentenced for pornography violations under a federal racketeering law". He appealed the case all the way to the US Supreme Court in Alexander v. United States, but the seizure of his assets and property was upheld.

The prosecutor argued that Ferris Alexander, 71 at the time of the trial and a resident of Minnetonka, had engaged in a 30-year pattern of racketeering, under-reporting of gross receipts for tax purposes, and transporting and possessing obscene material.

Ferris died on March 1, 2003.
