= Dalton v. Specter =

- Supreme Court of the United States

Argued March 2, 1994 Decided May 23, 1994
- Full case name: John H. Dalton, Secretary of the Navy, et al., Petitioners v. Arlen Specter, et al.
- Citations: 511 U.S. 462 (more) 114 S. Ct. 1719; 128 L. Ed. 2d 497; 1994 U.S. LEXIS 3778; 62 U.S.L.W. 4340; 94 Cal. Daily Op. Service 3643; 94 Daily Journal DAR 6846; 8 Fla. L. Weekly Fed. S 157

Holding
- An Executive Order to shut down the Philadelphia Naval Base cannot be held subject to judicial review, since the authorizing statute provided for non-Constitutional remedies for statutory review.

Court membership
- Chief Justice William Rehnquist Associate Justices Harry Blackmun · John P. Stevens; Sandra Day O'Connor · Antonin Scalia; Anthony Kennedy · David Souter; Clarence Thomas · Ruth Bader Ginsburg

Case opinions
- Majority: Rehnquist, joined by O'Connor, Scalia, Kennedy, Thomas; Blackmun, Stevens, Souter, Ginsburg (Part II)
- Concurrence: Blackmun (in part and in judgment)
- Concurrence: Souter (in part and in judgment), joined by Blackmun, Stevens, Ginsburg

Dalton v. Specter, 511 U.S. 462 (1994), was a case in which the United States Supreme Court held that an Executive Order to shut down the Philadelphia Naval Base was not subject to judicial review. In an opinion written by Chief Justice William Rehnquist, the Court held that the decision to close the base was not subject to review under the Administrative Procedure Act because the decision to close the base did not constitute the final action of an agency. Additionally, the Court held that the decision to close the base, which was made under the Defense Base Closure and Realignment Act of 1990, was not subject to judicial review because the 1990 Act "commits decisionmaking to the discretion of the President".

== See also ==
- List of United States Supreme Court cases, volume 511
