= Stansbury v. California =

Robert Edward Stansbury v. California
- Supreme Court of the United States

Argued March 30, 1994 Decided April 26, 1994
- Full case name: Robert Edward Stansbury v. California
- Citations: 511 U.S. 318 (more) 114 S. Ct. 1526; 128 L. Ed. 2d 293
- Argument: Oral argument

Case history
- Prior: Defendant convicted; Calif. Sup. Ct. affirms
- Subsequent: Case remanded to trial court.

Holding
- The test for custody under Miranda v. Arizona is whether there was a formal arrest or restraint on freedom of movement of the degree associated with a formal arrest. The subjective views harbored by either the interrogating officers or the person being questioned are irrelevant. The key inquiry should be whether the individual had been placed under formal arrest, or whether the restraint placed on the individual's freedom of movement rose to the level of a formal arrest.

Court membership
- Chief Justice William Rehnquist Associate Justices Harry Blackmun · John P. Stevens; Sandra Day O'Connor · Antonin Scalia; Anthony Kennedy · David Souter; Clarence Thomas · Ruth Bader Ginsburg

Case opinions
- Per curiam
- Concurrence: Blackmun

Laws applied
- U.S. Const. amend. V

Stansbury v. California, 511 U.S. 318 (1994), is a United States Supreme Court case in which the Court considered whether a police officer's subjective and undisclosed opinion whether a person who had been questioned was a suspect was relevant in determining whether that person had been in custody and thus entitled to the Miranda warnings. In a 9–0 ruling, the Court reversed and remanded the case. In a per curiam decision, the Court held that "an officer's subjective and undisclosed view concerning whether the person being interrogated is a suspect is irrelevant to the assessment [of] whether the person is in custody."
