= Huddleston v. United States =

- Supreme Court of the United States

Argued March 23, 1988 Decided May 2, 1988
- Full case name: Guy Rufus Huddleston v. United States of America
- Citations: 485 U.S. 681 (more) 108 S. Ct. 1496; 99 L. Ed. 2d 771; 1988 U.S. LEXIS 2035

Case history
- Prior: Conviction affirmed by the Sixth Circuit, 811 F.2d 974 (6th Cir. 1987).

Holding
- Evidence of other acts is admissible in federal court to show motive, opportunity, intent, preparation, plan, knowledge, or identity, and without a threshold determination that the acts have been proven.

Court membership
- Chief Justice William Rehnquist Associate Justices William J. Brennan Jr. · Byron White; Thurgood Marshall · Harry Blackmun; John P. Stevens · Sandra Day O'Connor; Antonin Scalia · Anthony Kennedy

Case opinion
- Majority: Rehnquist, joined by unanimous

Laws applied
- Fed. R. Evid. 404(b)

Huddleston v. United States, 485 U.S. 681 (1988), was a case in which the United States Supreme Court held that before admitting evidence of extrinsic acts under Rule 404(b) of the Federal Rules of Evidence, federal courts should assess the evidence's sufficiency under Federal Rule of Evidence 104(b). Under 104(b), "[w]hen the relevancy of evidence depends upon the fulfillment of a condition of fact, the court shall admit it upon, or subject to, the introduction of evidence sufficient to support a finding of the fulfillment of the condition."

== Facts ==
Huddleston was being tried for selling stolen goods and possessing stolen goods, related to two portions of a shipment of Memorex videocassettes that had been stolen from the Overnight Express yard in South Holland, Illinois. Huddleston later sold the missing videocassettes to the owner of Magic Rent-to-Own in Ypsilanti, Michigan. At the trial, he did not dispute that the cassettes had been stolen. Instead, he contested a crucial element of the charged crimes — whether he knew that the cassettes had been stolen.

To prove that he knew the cassettes were stolen, the government sought to introduce two pieces of relevant "similar acts" evidence. First, the government called Paul Toney, a record store owner, to testify that Huddleston had offered to sell him some 12" black-and-white television sets for $28 each. Toney testified that Huddleston told him he could obtain several thousand of these televisions. Toney eventually accompanied Huddleston to the Magic Rent-to-Own store on two occasions, and bought a total of 38 televisions.

Second, the government called Robert Nelson, an undercover FBI agent posing as an appliance dealer, to testify that Huddleston had offered to sell him a large quantity of Amana appliances. Nelson agreed to pay $8,000 for the appliances. At the time appointed to make the delivery, Nelson arrested Huddleston, and found that an acquittance of Huddleston's had brought part of a shipment of appliances that had been stolen.

Huddleston testified at the trial that he had obtained the videocassettes legitimately. The prosecution explained in closing arguments that Huddleston was being tried only for the videocassettes, and that the evidence about the televisions and the appliances was intended to help the jury determine whether Huddleston knew that the videotapes had been stolen. The jury convicted Huddleston on the possession charge but not on the sale charge.

Huddleston appealed his conviction to the Sixth Circuit. That court initially reversed the conviction because the government had not proven by clear and convincing evidence that Huddleston had known that either the televisions or the appliances had been stolen, and thus that those incidents were not admissible against Huddleston in his trial on the videocassette charges. After the Sixth Circuit decided in a different case that courts should prove similar acts evidence by a preponderance of the evidence, it upheld Huddleston's conviction because it concluded that the evidence regarding the televisions had been proven by a preponderance of the evidence.

== Decision of the Court ==
The Supreme Court agreed to hear the case "to resolve a conflict among the Courts of Appeals as to whether the trial court must make a preliminary finding before 'similar act' and other Rule 404(b) evidence is submitted to the jury." Chief Justice Rehnquist wrote for the unanimous court. Rule 404 of the Federal Rules of Evidence states:

Other crimes, wrongs, or acts. — Evidence of other crimes, wrongs, or acts is not admissible to prove the character of a person in order to show action in conformity therewith. It may, however, be admissible for other purposes, such as proof of motive, opportunity, intent, preparation, plan, knowledge, identity, or absence of mistake or accident.

"Extrinsic acts evidence may be critical to the establishment of the truth as to a disputed issue, especially when that issue involves the actor's state of mind and the only means of ascertaining that mental state is by drawing inferences from conduct." The Court held that extrinsic acts which are only relevant on the condition that a separate fact is proven true—such as Huddleston's previous sale of televisions—are "dealt with under Federal Rule of Evidence Rule 104(b)." Rule 104(b) states that "[w]hen the relevancy of evidence depends upon the fulfillment of a condition of fact, the court shall admit it upon, or subject to, the introduction of evidence sufficient to support a finding of the fulfillment of the condition." The Court reasoned that the text of 404(b) "contain[ed] no intimation . . . that any preliminary showing is necessary before such evidence may be introduced for a proper purpose" and rejected the petitioners argument that the issue should be governed under the stricter Rule 104(a) preponderance standard.

Thus, the Court held the evidence was properly admitted.

== Impact ==
Huddleston has been criticized for making it too easy for prosecutors to prove prior, unconvicted offenses for use under FRE 404(b). In response, the American Bar Association has proposed to amend FRE 404 to require that prior offenses be proven by a clear and convincing standard. Prior to the Court's decision, Edward Imwinkelried had proposed that prosecutors should be burdened to show that admitting the prior offense would be more probative than prejudicial.

== See also ==
- List of United States Supreme Court cases, volume 485
- List of United States Supreme Court cases
- Lists of United States Supreme Court cases by volume
- List of United States Supreme Court cases by the Rehnquist Court
