= Burns v. Reed =

- Supreme Court of the United States

Argued November 28, 1990 Decided May 30, 1991
- Full case name: Cathy Burns, Petitioner v. Rick Reed
- Citations: 500 U.S. 478 (more) 111 S. Ct. 1934; 114 L. Ed. 2d 547; 1991 U.S. LEXIS 3018; 59 U.S.L.W. 4536; 91 Cal. Daily Op. Service 3961; 91 Daily Journal DAR 6290

Holding
- A state prosecuting attorney is absolutely immune from liability for damages under § 1983 for participating in a probable cause hearing, but not for giving legal advice to the police.

Court membership
- Chief Justice William Rehnquist Associate Justices Byron White · Thurgood Marshall; Harry Blackmun · John P. Stevens; Sandra Day O'Connor · Antonin Scalia; Anthony Kennedy · David Souter

Case opinions
- Majority: White, joined by Rehnquist, Stevens, O'Connor, Kennedy, Souter
- Concur/dissent: Scalia, joined by Blackmun; Marshall (part III)

Laws applied
- 42 U.S.C. § 1983

Burns v. Reed, 500 U.S. 478 (1991), was a United States Supreme Court case. A prosecutor was absolutely immune from damages based upon positions taken in a probable cause hearing for a search warrant. The same prosecutor was not held entitled to immunity for giving legal advice to the police about the legality of an investigative practice.
