= University of Pennsylvania v. Equal Employment Opportunity Commission =

University of Pennsylvania v. EEOC
- Supreme Court of the United States

Argued November 7, 1989 Decided January 9, 1990
- Full case name: University of Pennsylvania v. Equal Employment Opportunity Commission
- Citations: 493 U.S. 182 (more) 110 S. Ct. 577; 107 L. Ed. 2d 571

Case history
- Prior: 850 F.2d 969 (3d Cir. 1988)

Holding
- A university does not enjoy a special privilege requiring a judicial finding of particularized necessity of access, beyond a showing of mere relevance, before peer review materials pertinent to charges of discrimination in tenure decisions are disclosed to the EEOC.

Court membership
- Chief Justice William Rehnquist Associate Justices William J. Brennan Jr. · Byron White; Thurgood Marshall · Harry Blackmun; John P. Stevens · Sandra Day O'Connor; Antonin Scalia · Anthony Kennedy

Case opinion
- Majority: Blackmun, joined by unanimous

Laws applied
- U.S. Const. amend. I, 42 U.S.C. § 2000e-2

University of Pennsylvania v. Equal Employment Opportunity Commission, 493 U.S. 182 (1990), is a US labor law case of the US Supreme Court holding neither common law evidentiary privilege, nor First Amendment academic freedom protects peer review materials that are relevant to charges of racial or sexual discrimination in tenure decisions.

== Facts ==
Rosalie Tung, then an associate professor at the Wharton School of Business at the University of Pennsylvania, was denied a tenure position by a tenure review board. Tung alleged that she had been the victim of sexual harassment by the board chairman, and that the board discriminated against her Chinese-American heritage.

Tung then filed a charge with the Equal Employment Opportunity Commission (EEOC). The EEOC has a broad Congressional mandate to investigate and remedy employment discrimination on the basis of race, color, religion, sex, or national origin. 42 U.S.C. § 2000e-2(a). The EEOC requested, subpoenaed, then sued to enforce its subpoena of Tung's tenure review file and the tenure review files of five male faculty members. The university refused to provide review materials, citing constitutional protection under the First Amendment and the societal interest inherent in the peer review process.

== Judgment ==
=== Lower courts ===
The EEOC applied to the United States District Court for the Eastern District of Pennsylvania for enforcement of its subpoena. The court entered a brief enforcement order. United States Court of Appeals for the Third Circuit affirmed the decision, and the Supreme Court granted certiorari limited to the compelled-disclosure question.

=== Supreme Court ===
The question presented was whether a university enjoys a special privilege, grounded either in the common law or the First Amendment, against disclosure of peer review materials that are relevant to charge or racial or sexual discrimination in tenure decisions. The university argued for recognition of a common law privilege against disclosure of confidential peer review materials, and for a First Amendment right of academic freedom against disclosure of the documents. In either case, the university sought a requirement of judicial finding of particularized necessity of access, beyond showing of mere relevance, before peer review materials could be disclosed to the EEOC.

The EEOC argued that it possesses a broad Congressional mandate to investigate and remedy employment discrimination on the basis of race, color, religion, sex, or national origin, and that any infringement of the university's First Amendment rights is permissible because of the substantial relation between the EEOC's request and the overriding and compelling state interest in eradicating invidious discrimination.

Justice Blackmun, writing for a unanimous Court, declined to create a new privilege against the disclosure of peer review materials, and held that the First Amendment right of academic freedom would not be expanded to protect the materials from disclosure.

The Court found that the university did not meet the high burden needed to create a new common law evidentiary privilege, as the privilege sought did not promote sufficiently important interests to outweigh the need for probative evidence. The Court was satisfied that Congress, in granting power to the EEOC, considered academic freedom and declined to carve out an evidentiary privilege for it. And that, while "confidentiality is important to the proper function of the peer review process," the "costs associated with racial and sexual discrimination in institutions of higher learning are very substantial."

The Court noted the special status of universities in a democratic society, and the "essential freedom" that a university possesses "to determine for itself on academic grounds who may teach." However, the Court held that the EEOC's subpoenas are not intended or do not in fact direct the content of university discourse toward or away from particular subjects or points of view. Nor was the EEOC "providing criteria [the University] must use in selecting teachers, [or] preventing the University from using any criteria it may wish to use, except those--including race, sex, and national origin--that are proscribed under Title VII."

The Court held that the university was not entitled to a common law evidentiary privilege protecting tenure review materials, and that the EEOC subpoena process did not infringe any First Amendment right enjoyed by the university.

Arguments regarding particularized necessity of access were not addressed, nor were the EEOC's arguments regarding its Congressional mandate and the compelling state interest of eliminating employment discrimination.

== See also ==
- US labor law
- List of United States Supreme Court cases, volume 493
- List of United States Supreme Court cases
- List of United States Supreme Court cases by the Rehnquist Court
