= Florida v. Jimeno =

- Supreme Court of the United States

Argued March 25, 1991 Decided May 23, 1991
- Full case name: Florida v. Enio Jimeno
- Citations: 500 U.S. 248 (more) 111 S. Ct. 1801; 114 L. Ed. 2d 297

Holding
- Jimeno's consent to the search of the car did extend to the closed paper bag within the car, and did not violate the Fourth Amendment's prohibition of unreasonable searches.

Court membership
- Chief Justice William Rehnquist Associate Justices Byron White · Thurgood Marshall; Harry Blackmun · John P. Stevens; Sandra Day O'Connor · Antonin Scalia; Anthony Kennedy · David Souter

Case opinions
- Majority: Rehnquist, joined by White, Blackmun, O'Connor, Scalia, Kennedy, Souter
- Dissent: Marshall, joined by Stevens

Laws applied
- U.S. Const. amend. IV

Florida v. Jimeno, 500 U.S. 248 (1991), was a U.S. Supreme Court case involving the exclusionary rule of evidence under the Fourth Amendment.

== Background ==
A police officer pulled over Enio Jimeno for a traffic violation after following him due to information that he may have been involved in a drug deal. Jimeno consented to a search of his car, but nothing more. The officer had informed Jimeno that he suspected him of having drugs in the car. The officer opened up a package and found cocaine inside. At trial, Jimeno argued that his consent to search his car did not extend to his permission to search within containers and packages. The lower court and the Florida Supreme Court upheld that Jimeno's consent did not cover the officer's efforts and thus ruled in Jimeno's favor. The State of Florida appealed to the United States Supreme Court.

== Opinion of the Court ==
In a 7-2 vote, the Court overturned the lower courts' decision and ruled that the officer's search of containers within the car were not considered unreasonable. Since a reasonable person would expect narcotics to be carried in a container, and because the officer told Jimeno of his suspicions, the Court ruled that the officer acted within reason. Jimeno was thus found guilty and the officer was not in violation of the 4th amendment.

== Significance ==
This case grants law enforcement greater ability to conduct searches. It also narrows the definition of unreasonable searches and thus limits the protection citizens can seek against such searches. Evidence cannot be excluded from a case if it is deemed to have been discovered through reasonable means.
