= United States v. Shabani =

- Supreme Court of the United States

Argued October 3, 1994 Decided November 1, 1994
- Full case name: United States, Petitioner v. Reshat Shabani
- Citations: 513 U.S. 10 (more) 115 S. Ct. 382; 130 L. Ed. 2d 225

Case history
- Prior: Convicted, conspiracy to distribute cocaine; conviction overturned, 993 F. 2d 1419 (9th Circuit, 1993)
- Subsequent: 9th Circuit Reversed by Supreme Court and conviction upheld

Holding
- Absent contrary indications, Congress intends to adopt the common law definition of statutory terms. The common law understanding of conspiracy "does not make the doing of any act other than the act of conspiring a condition of liability."

Court membership
- Chief Justice William Rehnquist Associate Justices John P. Stevens · Sandra Day O'Connor; Antonin Scalia · Anthony Kennedy; David Souter · Clarence Thomas; Ruth Bader Ginsburg · Stephen Breyer

Case opinion
- Majority: O'Connor, joined by unanimous

Laws applied
- 21 U.S.C. § 846

United States v. Shabani, 513 U.S. 10 (1994), was a court case in which the Supreme Court of the United States clarified standards for conspiracy liability under a federal drug conspiracy statute. In a unanimous opinion written by Justice Sandra Day O'Connor, the Court held that government prosecutors need not prove evidence of an overt act in furtherance of the conspiracy when prosecuting individuals under the drug conspiracy statute codified at 21 U.S.C. § 846. Justice O'Connor wrote that Congress intended to "adopt the common law definition" of conspiracy for section 846, which did not require an overt act as a precondition of liability. Justice O'Connor's opinion also compared the drug conspiracy statute to the general conspiracy statute, which requires that a conspirator commit an overt act in furtherance of the conspiracy, noting that "[i]n light of this additional element in the general conspiracy statute, Congress' silence in § 846 speaks volumes."

== See also ==
- actus reus
- List of United States Supreme Court cases, volume 513
- List of United States Supreme Court cases
- Lists of United States Supreme Court cases by volume
- List of United States Supreme Court cases by the Rehnquist Court
