= National Archives and Records Administration v. Favish =

- Supreme Court of the United States

Argued December 3, 2003 Decided March 30, 2004
- Full case name: National Archives and Records Administration v. Allan J. Favish, et al.
- Docket no.: 02-954
- Citations: 541 U.S. 157 (more)

Case history
- Prior: United States Court of Appeals for the Ninth Circuit

Holding
- (i) A family has the right to invoke a deceased individual's right to privacy (ii) the unwarranted invasion of privacy exception in the FOIA must have evidence of improper conduct to overturn

Court membership
- Chief Justice William Rehnquist Associate Justices John P. Stevens · Sandra Day O'Connor; Antonin Scalia · Anthony Kennedy; David Souter · Clarence Thomas; Ruth Bader Ginsburg · Stephen Breyer

Case opinion
- Majority: Anthony Kennedy, joined by a unanimous court

Laws applied
- 5 U.S.C. § 552

National Archives and Records Administration v. Favish et al., 541 U.S. 157 (2004) is a United States Supreme Court ruling about the Freedom of Information Act concerning the release of photos surrounding the suicide of Vince Foster, then Deputy White House Counsel. The court ruled unanimously that a family has the right to invoke a deceased individual's right to privacy and the unwarranted invasion of privacy exception in the Act must have evidence of improper conduct to overturn the exception.

== See also ==
- United States Department of Justice v. Reporters Committee for Freedom of the Press
- McCambridge v. Little Rock, 298 Ark. 219, 231–232, 766 S. W. 2d 909, 915 (1989)
