= Owen v. Owen =

- Supreme Court of the United States

Argued November 5, 1990 Decided May 23, 1991
- Full case name: Owen v. Owen
- Citations: 500 U.S. 305 (more)

Holding
- The Bankruptcy Code's Section 522(f) allows a judicial lien to be eliminated even when a state's bankruptcy policy has defined exempt property to exclude property encumbered by a judicial lien.

Court membership
- Chief Justice William Rehnquist Associate Justices Byron White · Thurgood Marshall; Harry Blackmun · John P. Stevens; Sandra Day O'Connor · Antonin Scalia; Anthony Kennedy · David Souter

Case opinions
- Majority: Scalia, joined by Rehnquist, White, Marshall, Blackmun, O'Connor, Kennedy, Souter
- Dissent: Stevens

Laws applied
- Bankruptcy Code

Owen v. Owen, 500 U.S. 305 (1991), was a United States Supreme Court case in which the court held that the Bankruptcy Code's Section 522(f) allows a judicial lien to be eliminated even when a state's bankruptcy policy has defined exempt property to exclude property encumbered by a judicial lien.

== Background ==
The Bankruptcy Code allows States to define what property is exempt from the bankruptcy estate that will be distributed among the debtor's creditors. The Florida Constitution provides a homestead exemption, which the state courts have held inapplicable to liens that attach before the property in question acquires its homestead status.

Dwight Owen purchased his Florida condominium in 1984 subject to Helen Owen's preexisting judgment lien, and the property first qualified as a homestead under a 1985 amendment to Florida's homestead law. After Dwight filed a Chapter 7 petition for bankruptcy in 1986, the Bankruptcy Court, among other things, sustained his claimed homestead exemption in the condominium, but it subsequently denied his post-discharge motion to avoid Helen's lien pursuant to Bankruptcy Code § 522(f). By that time, Dwight and Helen were divorced. The federal District Court and the Eleventh Circuit Court of Appeals affirmed the Bankruptcy Court's ruling, holding that, since the lien had attached before the condominium qualified for the homestead exemption, the property was not exempt under state law.

The Supreme Court granted certiorari.

== Opinion of the court ==
The Supreme Court issued an opinion on May 23, 1991.
