= Tome v. United States =

- Supreme Court of the United States

Argued October 5, 1994 Decided January 10, 1995
- Full case name: Matthew Wayne Tome v. United States
- Citations: 513 U.S. 150 (more) 115 S. Ct. 696; 130 L. Ed. 2d 574

Case history
- Prior: 3 F.3d 342 (10th Cir. 1995) (reversed)
- Subsequent: On remand, 61 F.3d 1446 (10th Cir. 1995)

Holding
- For a prior consistent statement to be admissible under FRE 801(d)(1)(B), the statement must have been made before the motive to fabricate arose.

Court membership
- Chief Justice William Rehnquist Associate Justices John P. Stevens · Sandra Day O'Connor; Antonin Scalia · Anthony Kennedy; David Souter · Clarence Thomas; Ruth Bader Ginsburg · Stephen Breyer

Case opinions
- Majority: Kennedy, joined by Stevens, Souter, Ginsburg; Scalia (except part II-B)
- Concurrence: Scalia (in part and in judgment)
- Dissent: Breyer, joined by Rehnquist, O'Connor, Thomas

Laws applied
- FRE 801(d)(1)(B)

Tome v. United States, 513 U.S. 150 (1995), was a case decided by the Supreme Court of the United States that held that under Federal Rules of Evidence Rule 801(d)(1)(B), a prior consistent statement is not hearsay only if the statement was made before the motive to fabricate arose.

== Factual background ==
The defendant, Matthew Tome, was found guilty of sexually abusing his four-year-old daughter A.T. After her parents' divorce, A.T. was in Tome's primary physical custody, and she stayed with Tome on the Navajo Reservation in New Mexico. A.T.'s mother lived in Colorado.

At trial, A.T. was six and a half years old and testified by short answers to leading questions. During cross-examination, the defense suggested that A.T. had fabricated the allegations against Tome because she wanted to go live with her mother. To rebut the charge of fabrication, the prosecution called six witnesses (a babysitter, A.T.'s mother, a social worker, and three pediatricians) that all testified to statements about the abuse that A.T. had made to them. The trial court admitted the statements under FRE 801, which reads:

(d) A statement is not hearsay if -

(1) The declarant testifies at the trial or hearing and is subject to cross-examination concerning the statement, and the statement is

(B) consistent with the declarant's testimony and is offered to rebut an express or implied charge against the declarant of recent fabrication or improper influence or motive . . .

The Tenth Circuit affirmed Tome's conviction, and the Supreme Court granted certiorari.

== Opinion of the Court ==
=== Majority opinion ===
Justice Kennedy, joined by Justices Stevens, Scalia, Souter, and Ginsburg, delivered the opinion for a majority of the court except for Part II-B, a plurality where Justice Kennedy was joined by Justices Stevens, Souter, and Ginsburg. The Court noted that not all prior consistent statements by a witness were excluded from the bar against hearsay evidence. The text of FRE 801(d)(1)(B) accorded not hearsay status only to prior consistent statements by a testifying witness used to rebut a charge of recent fabrication. The Court reasoned that to properly rebut a charge of fabrication, a prior consistent statement would need to have predated the motive to fabricate. Otherwise prior consistent statements would be admissible to rebut other forms of impeachment, and this would ignore the common law temporal requirement that the Advisory Committee Note said was adopted by the rule.

The Court found this approach consistent with the Federal Rules' liberal approach to admissibility, and rejected the Government's advocacy for a general balancing test for hearsay.

In the present case, the purported motivation to fabricate arose when A.T. was put in her father's custody in 1988, before the prior consistent statements in 1990. Finding that the statements from the other witnesses should not have been admissible under FRE 801(d)(1)(B), the Court reversed Tome's conviction and remanded the case.

=== Plurality opinion ===
Part II-B represented only a plurality of Justices, and discussed how the Advisory Committee notes for the Federal Rules supported the holding.

=== Justice Scalia's concurrence ===
Justice Scalia, who joined in the judgment of the Court and Kennedy's opinion except for Part II-B, wrote separately to emphasize that the Advisory Committee Notes should not be relied upon when interpreting the Federal Rules of Evidence.

=== Justice Breyer's dissent ===
In a dissent joined by Chief Justice Rehnquist, Justice O'Connor, and Justice Thomas, Justice Breyer characterized the case as one about relevance and not hearsay. Breyer argued that the timing of the alleged motive to fabricate should go to the probative force of the testimony, not its reliability. Breyer thought that a post-motive consistent statement could be admitted to rebut a charge of fabrication, but that the probative force of the statement would simply be diminished. Breyer argued that FRE 801(d)(1)(B) could simply be a recognition that juries can have difficulty in separating the impeaching and substantive uses of hearsay statements, and so the rule declared as not hearsay prior consistent statements used to rebut charges of fabrication. In that sense, the usefulness of the Rule did not rest on the majority's timing requirement.

== Subsequent history ==
On remand, the Tenth Circuit found that some of the hearsay admitted in the original trial was admitted erroneously under the standard enunciated by the Supreme Court. Finding that the error was not harmless, the Tenth Circuit reversed and remanded the case.

== Impact ==
As an interpretation of the Federal Rules of Evidence, Tome is not binding on state courts. In states including Montana and Nebraska, courts have held that a statement fulfilling the premotive requirement of Tome are admissible as both impeachment and substantive evidence.

Other states including Colorado and the First Circuit have held that prior consistent statements that do not fulfill the premotive requirement of Tome may still be admitted for rehabilitative purposes.

== See also ==
- List of United States Supreme Court cases, volume 513
