= Oregon Waste Systems, Inc. v. Department of Environmental Quality of Oregon =

- Supreme Court of the United States

Argued January 18, 1994 Decided April 4, 1994
- Full case name: Oregon Waste Systems, Inc., et al. v. Department of Environmental Quality of Oregon, et al.
- Citations: 511 U.S. 93 (more) 114 S. Ct. 1345; 128 L. Ed. 2d 13

Case history
- Prior: 316 Ore. 99 (reversed and remanded).

Holding
- Oregon's surcharge was invalid under the dormant commerce clause

Court membership
- Chief Justice William Rehnquist Associate Justices Harry Blackmun · John P. Stevens; Sandra Day O'Connor · Antonin Scalia; Anthony Kennedy · David Souter; Clarence Thomas · Ruth Bader Ginsburg

Case opinions
- Majority: Thomas, joined by Stevens, O'Connor, Scalia, Kennedy, Souter, Ginsburg
- Dissent: Rehnquist, joined by Blackmun

Laws applied
- U.S. Const. art. I § 8 cl. 3 (Commerce Clause), Dormant Commerce Clause

Oregon Waste Systems, Inc. v. Department of Environmental Quality of Oregon, 511 U.S. 93 (1994), is a United States Supreme Court decision focused on the aspect of state power and the interpretation of the Commerce Clause as a limitation on states' regulatory power. In this particular case, the Supreme Court considered whether the Oregon Department of Environmental Quality's alleged cost-based surcharge on the disposal of out-of-state waste violated the dormant commerce clause.

== Opinion of the Court ==
The Court voted 7–2 in favor of Oregon Waste Systems, holding that Oregon's surcharge was invalid under the negative commerce clause. This meant that the surcharge favored in-state economic interests over out-of-state counterparts. The surcharge was discriminatory to outside states because it imposed a fee three times greater than that imposed on in-state waste.

In order for such a surcharge to be valid, it would have to be justified as compensatory, in that it makes out-of-state shippers pay their fair share of the disposal costs. This would have to be equivalent to a measurable standard that would be the same for in-state shipping. However, Oregon's surcharge of $2.25 for out-of-state waste compared with a surcharge of $0.85 on in-state waste was determined facially discriminatory. Citing a previous case, the Supreme Court indicated that such surcharges may be acceptable if they were based on increased costs specifically associated with out-of-state waste.

== See also ==
- City of Philadelphia v. New Jersey, 437 U.S. 617 (1978)
- List of United States Supreme Court cases
- Lists of United States Supreme Court cases by volume
- List of United States Supreme Court cases, volume 511
- List of United States Supreme Court cases by the Rehnquist Court
