= Kentucky v. Stincer =

- Supreme Court of the United States

Argued April 22, 1987 Decided June 19, 1987
- Full case name: Kentucky v. Stincer
- Citations: 482 U.S. 730 (more)

Case history
- Prior: Conviction reversed, 712 S.W.2d 939 (Ky. 1986), certiorari granted, 479 U.S. 1005 (1986)

Holding
- Respondent's rights under the Confrontation Clause of the Sixth Amendment were not violated by his exclusion from the competency hearing.

Court membership
- Chief Justice William Rehnquist Associate Justices William J. Brennan Jr. · Byron White; Thurgood Marshall · Harry Blackmun; Lewis F. Powell Jr. · John P. Stevens; Sandra Day O'Connor · Antonin Scalia

Case opinions
- Majority: Blackmun, joined by Rehnquist, White, Powell, O'Connor, Scalia
- Dissent: Marshall, joined by Brennan, Stevens

Laws applied
- Confrontation Clause

Kentucky v. Stincer, 482 U.S. 730 (1987), was a United States Supreme Court case in which the Court held that the respondent's rights under the Confrontation Clause of the Sixth Amendment were not violated by his exclusion from the competency hearing.

== Significance ==
Although the respondent in this case lost, the case stands for the proposition that the criminal defendant's right to be present and participate in their trial is broader than the explicit protection of Confrontation. Under the Due Process Clause, the defendant has a right to be present at any critical stage of the trial where their appearance affects the fairness of the outcome.
