= Immigration and Naturalization Service v. Abudu =

- Supreme Court of the United States

Argued December 1, 1987 Decided March 1, 1988
- Full case name: Immigration and Naturalization Service, Petitioner v. Assibi Abudu
- Citations: 485 U.S. 94 (more) 108 S. Ct. 904; 99 L. Ed. 2d 90; 1988 U.S. LEXIS 1066; 56 U.S.L.W. 4195

Case history
- Prior: Denial of motion to reopen deportation proceedings affirmed by Board of Immigration Appeals. Judgment reversed by Ninth Circuit, 802 F.2d 1096 (9th Cir. 1986). Cert. granted, 480 U.S. 937 (1987).

Holding
- Federal courts of appeals must review denials of motions to reopen immigration proceedings for abuse of discretion.

Court membership
- Chief Justice William Rehnquist Associate Justices William J. Brennan Jr. · Byron White; Thurgood Marshall · Harry Blackmun; John P. Stevens · Sandra Day O'Connor; Antonin Scalia · Anthony Kennedy

Case opinion
- Majority: Stevens, joined by unanimous
- Kennedy took no part in the consideration or decision of the case.

Laws applied
- 8 C.F.R. § 208.11

Immigration and Naturalization Service v. Abudu, 485 U.S. 94 (1988), was a United States Supreme Court case in which the Court shifted the balance toward adjudications made by the INS and away from those made by the federal courts of appeals when aliens who had been ordered deported seek to present new evidence in order to avoid deportation. The Court ruled that courts must review the Board of Immigration Appeals's decision to deny motions to reopen immigration proceedings—the name of the procedural device used to present new evidence to immigration officials—for abuse of discretion.

== Facts ==
Assibi Abudu first came to the United States from his native Ghana in 1965 as a student. He went to medical school, and spent the summer of 1973 in his home country. When Assibi Abudu returned to the United States that fall, his student visa allowed him to remain until 1976. When the visa expired, however, Assibi Abudu did not return to Ghana. Instead, he remained in the United States and married an American citizen. In 1981, Assibi Abudu pleaded guilty to charges of attempting to obtain demerol by fraud. The immigration department then began deportation proceedings.

In these first deportation proceedings, Assibi Abudu tried to remain in the United States by adjusting his status on account of his marriage to an American citizen. But his conviction for a drug crime made him excludable from the United States, and so immigration officials denied his request for adjustment of status. Assibi Abudu expressly did not seek asylum during these proceedings. He selected England as his country of deportation in the event he should lose his deportation hearing, which he did in July 1982. The BIA affirmed in August 1984. Assibi Abudu asked the Ninth Circuit to review this decision.

In February 1985, Abudu sought to reopen his immigration proceedings so that he might present evidence in support of an application for asylum. He claimed he had a well-founded fear that if England would not accept him and he returned to Ghana, his life and freedom would be threatened by the regime in power there. After that regime seized power, it had carried out a system of persecution against its political enemies, including Assibi Abudu's brother and other close friends. A surprise visitor from Ghana in 1984, who was a high-ranking official in the government of Ghana, ostensibly tried to persuade Abudu to return to Ghana because physicians were in short supply there. Assibi Abudu suspected that the visitor was attempting to trick him into revealing his brother's whereabouts instead.

The BIA denied Assibi Abudu's motion to reopen the immigration proceedings because Assibi had not adequately explained why he did not present these concerns in earlier proceedings. The immigration judge had given Abudu extra time to present evidence in support of an application for asylum, but Assibi Abudu instead told the immigration judge he would not be presenting such an application. Moreover, all this evidence—except for the 1984 surprise visit—was available to Assibi Abudu during the first round of proceedings. Furthermore, even if he had, the BIA concluded it would not have made out a prima facie case for asylum or withholding of deportation. He did not present an affidavit from his brother, and his claims were too speculative to the BIA to make out the requisite showing. Assibi Abudu asked the Ninth Circuit to review the denial of his motion to reopen as well.

The Ninth Circuit consolidated the two pending petitions for review. It ultimately ordered the BIA to reevaluate Assibi Abudu's requests for asylum and withholding of deportation and grant him a full-blown hearing on the matters. In the Ninth Circuit's view, the "sole issue" was whether Assibi Abudu had made out a prima facie case for reopening. Because the BIA did not adequately credit the affidavits Abudu had submitted, the Ninth Circuit demanded that it give Assibi Abudu another chance to present more evidence. The INS asked the Supreme Court to review the Ninth Circuit's decision, and the Supreme Court agreed to do so.

== Opinion of the Court ==
The BIA may deny a motion to reopen on at least three grounds. First, it may determine that the applicant has not established a prima facie case to the underlying relief he seeks, such as asylum or withholding of removal. Second, the BIA may determine that the new evidence the applicant seeks to present was not previously unavailable, or in an asylum case, that the applicant has not adequately explained why he did not apply for asylum earlier. Third, in cases where the ultimate relief the applicant seeks depends on the exercise of some discretion committed to immigration officials, the BIA may determine that the applicant is not entitled to the discretionary relief sought. Thus, "in a given case the BIA may determine, either as a sufficient ground for denying relief or as a necessary step toward granting relief, whether the alien has produced previously unavailable, material evidence, and, in asylum cases, whether the alien has reasonably explained his or her failure to request asylum earlier." The Court held that these determinations were subject to review in the federal courts of appeals for abuse of discretion and not any higher standard. "Although all adjudications by administrative agencies are to some degree judicial and to some degree political—and therefore an abuse-of-discretion standard will often apply to agency adjudicatons not governed by specific statutory commands—INS officials must exercise especially sensitive political functions that implicate questions of foreign relations, and therefore the reasons for giving deference to agency decisions on petitions for reopening or reconsideration in other administrative contexts apply with even greater force in the INS context." Moreover, in other totally judicial contexts, such as motions for new trials on the basis of newly discovered evidence, the movant bears an "especially heavy burden." There is no reason not to require an alien seeking to reopen his deportation proceedings to carry an equally heavy burden.

== See also ==
- List of United States Supreme Court cases, volume 485
- List of United States Supreme Court cases
- Lists of United States Supreme Court cases by volume
- List of United States Supreme Court cases by the Rehnquist Court
