= James v. Illinois =

- Supreme Court of the United States

Argued October 3, 1989 Decided January 10, 1990
- Full case name: James v. Illinois
- Citations: 493 U.S. 307 (more) 110 S. Ct. 648; 107 L. Ed. 2d 676; 1990 U.S. LEXIS 335; 58 U.S.L.W. 4115

Case history
- Prior: Cert. to the Supreme Court of Illinois

Court membership
- Chief Justice William Rehnquist Associate Justices William J. Brennan Jr. · Byron White; Thurgood Marshall · Harry Blackmun; John P. Stevens · Sandra Day O'Connor; Antonin Scalia · Anthony Kennedy

Case opinions
- Majority: Brennan, joined by White, Marshall, Blackmun, Stevens
- Concurrence: Stevens
- Dissent: Kennedy, joined by Rehnquist, O'Connor, Scalia

Laws applied
- U.S. Const. amend. IV

James v. Illinois, 493 U.S. 307 (1990), was a United States Supreme Court case in which the Court forbade the admission of evidence obtained in violation of the Fourth Amendment for the use of impeaching statements made by a defense witness.

== Background ==
On August 30, 1982, a group of eight boys was confronted by another group of boys who demanded money. The group of eight refused and was fired upon, resulting in the death of one boy and injury to another. After police arrived on the scene the group of eight acted as witnesses by recounting their experience to the police. Darryl James was eventually brought into custody as a suspect. He was arrested in his mother's beauty salon. The police questioned him about his hair color to which he responded that although his hair was currently black and curly it had previously been reddish-brown and slicked back. After arriving at the police station James was again questioned and he then told police he changed his hair color to alter his appearance.

James was eventually indicted for murder and attempted murder. James attempted to suppress the statements he had previously made about his hair as being "fruit of the poisonous tree" obtained in violation of the Fourth Amendment, as there had been no probable cause for his arrest.

=== Lower courts ===
At trial the state's witnesses testified that the shooter had reddish hair that was slicked back. Each witness also identified James from weeks prior where they admitted he met the description, although one witness, Henderson, said James' hair was black on that day. Although James objected to the testimony, the trial court allowed James' statements regarding his hair to impeach Henderson, and James was subsequently convicted.

The Illinois Appellate Court reversed the conviction, holding that James' statements should have been suppressed as "fruit of the poisonous tree", even to impeach Henderson. The Illinois Supreme Court reversed this decision, holding that there was no Fourth Amendment violation and thereby reinstating the murder conviction.

== Opinion of the Court ==
Justice Brennan delivered the opinion of the Court in a 5–4 decision in favor of James, reversing both his conviction and the decision of the Illinois Supreme Court. He noted that James' statements could not be used in a court of law and that the Illinois Supreme Court "wrongly expanded the practice" of illegally obtaining evidence to impeach a defendant's own testimony. Justice Brennan noted that this expansion "would frustrate rather than further the purposes underlying the exclusionary rule."
