= Boos v. Barry =

- Supreme Court of the United States

Argued November 9, 1987 Decided March 22, 1988
- Full case name: Michael Boos, J. Michael Waller and Bridget Brooker, Petitioners v. Marion S. BARRY, Jr., Mayor, District of Columbia, et al.
- Citations: 485 U.S. 312 (more)

Holding
- Content-based restrictions on political speech in a public forum must be narrowly tailored to serve a compelling state interest.

Court membership
- Chief Justice William Rehnquist Associate Justices William J. Brennan Jr. · Byron White; Thurgood Marshall · Harry Blackmun; John P. Stevens · Sandra Day O'Connor; Antonin Scalia · Anthony Kennedy

Case opinions
- Majority: O'Connor, joined by Brennan, Marshall, Stevens, Scalia
- Concurrence: Brennan, Marshall
- Concurrence: Rehnquist (dissenting in part), joined by White, Blackmun
- Kennedy took no part in the consideration or decision of the case.

Laws applied
- U.S. Const. amend. I

Boos v. Barry, 485 U.S. 312 (1988), was a First Amendment rights case before the United States Supreme Court. The plaintiffs, a group protesting the Contra War and the jailing of Andrei Sakharov, challenged a District of Columbia code forbidding the display within 500 feet of an embassy of any sign that tends to bring the foreign government in question into "public odium" or "public disrepute."

The U.S. Supreme Court found the "display clause" of the code banning the display of certain protest signs to be facially unconstitutional, as the U.S. government did not have a compelling interest in protecting foreign governments from insults. However, the court maintained the constitutionality of a "congregation clause" of the code requiring protesters to obey any police dispersal orders.
