= List of United States Supreme Court cases, volume 511 =

This is a list of all the United States Supreme Court cases from volume 511 of the United States Reports:

Case name	Citation	Date decided
Victor v. Nebraska	511 U.S. 1	1994
United States v. Granderson	511 U.S. 39	1994
The minimum revocation sentence under § 3565(a)'s drug-possession proviso is one-third the maximum of the originally applicable Guidelines range of imprisonment, and the maximum revocation sentence is the Guidelines maximum.
Powell v. Nevada	511 U.S. 79	1994
County of Riverside v. McLaughlin is retroactive.
Oregon Waste Systems, Inc. v. Department of Environmental Quality of Ore.	511 U.S. 93	1994
Ticor Title Ins. Co. v. Brown	511 U.S. 117	1994
Because deciding this case would have required the court to resolve a constitutional question that may have been entirely hypothetical, the writ was dismissed as improvidently granted.
J. E. B. v. Alabama ex rel. T. B.	511 U.S. 127	1994
Central Bank v. First Interstate Bank	511 U.S. 164	1994
McDermott, Inc. v. AmClyde	511 U.S. 202	1994
Boca Grande Club, Inc. v. Florida Power & Light Co.	511 U.S. 222	1994
United States v. Irvine	511 U.S. 224	1994
The disclaimer of a remainder interest in a trust is subject to federal gift taxation when the creation of the interest (but not the disclaimer) occurred before enactment of the gift tax.
Landgraf v. USI Film Products	511 U.S. 244	1994
Section 102 of Title VII does not apply to a Title VII case that was pending on appeal when the 1991 Act was enacted.
Rivers v. Roadway Express, Inc.	511 U.S. 298	1994
Section 101 of the Civil Rights Act of 1991 does not apply to a case that arose before it was enacted.
Stansbury v. California	511 U.S. 318	1994
Chicago v. Environmental Defense Fund	511 U.S. 328	1994
Section 3001(1) of Solid Waste Disposal Act (a provision within the Resource Conservation and Recovery Act of 1976), does not exempt ash generated by a resource recovery facility's incineration of municipal solid waste from regulation as a hazardous waste under RCRA Subtitle C.
United States v. Alvarez-Sanchez	511 U.S. 350	1994
In re Anderson	511 U.S. 364	1994
Beecham v. United States	511 U.S. 368	1994
Kokkonen v. Guardian Life Ins. Co. of America	511 U.S. 375	1994
A federal district court, possessing only that power authorized by Constitution and statute, lacks jurisdiction over a claim for breach of a contract, part of the consideration for which was dismissal of an earlier federal suit.
C & A Carbone, Inc. v. Clarkstown	511 U.S. 383	1994
Security Services, Inc. v. Kmart Corp.	511 U.S. 431	1994
Dalton v. Specter	511 U.S. 462	1994
Custis v. United States	511 U.S. 485	1994
Posters 'N' Things, Ltd. v. United States	511 U.S. 513	1994
BFP v. Resolution Trust Corporation	511 U.S. 531	1994
NLRB v. Health Care & Retirement Corp. of America	511 U.S. 571	1994
Staples v. United States	511 U.S. 600	1994
Associated Industries of Mo. v. Lohman	511 U.S. 641	1994
Morgan Stanley & Co. v. Pacific Mut. Life Ins. Co.	511 U.S. 658	1994
McKnight v. General Motors Corp.	511 U.S. 659	1994
Waters v. Churchill	511 U.S. 661	1994
PUD No. 1 of Jefferson County v. Washington Department of Ecology	511 U.S. 700	1994
Nichols v. United States	511 U.S. 738	1994
Department of Revenue of Mont. v. Kurth Ranch	511 U.S. 767	1994
Key Tronic Corp. v. United States	511 U.S. 809	1994
Farmer v. Brennan	511 U.S. 825	1994
Digital Equipment Corp. v. Desktop Direct, Inc.	511 U.S. 863	1994
