= O'Lone v. Estate of Shabazz =

O'Lone v. Estate Of Shabazz
- Supreme Court of the United States

Argued March 24, 1987 Decided June 9, 1987
- Full case name: O'Lone, Administrator, Leesburg Prison Complex, et al. v. Estate of Shabazz, et al.
- Docket no.: 85-1722
- Citations: 482 U.S. 342 (more) 107 S. Ct. 2400; 96 L. Ed. 2d 282; 1987 U.S. LEXIS 2604

Holding
- The Court of Appeals erred in placing the burden on prison officials to disprove the availability of alternative methods of accommodating prisoners' religious rights. That approach fails to reflect the respect and deference the Constitution allows for the judgment of prison administrators.

Court membership
- Chief Justice William Rehnquist Associate Justices William J. Brennan Jr. · Byron White; Thurgood Marshall · Harry Blackmun; Lewis F. Powell Jr. · John P. Stevens; Sandra Day O'Connor · Antonin Scalia

Case opinions
- Majority: Rehnquist, joined by White, Powell, O'Connor, Scalia
- Dissent: Brennan, joined by Marshall, Blackmun, Stevens

Laws applied
- U.S. Const. amend. I

O'Lone v. Estate of Shabazz, 482 U.S. 342 (1987), was a U.S. Supreme Court decision involving the constitutionality of prison regulations. The court ruled that the prison regulations were not a violation of the Free Exercise Clause of the First Amendment of the U.S. Constitution to deprive an inmate of attending a religious service for "legitimate penological interests."

== Background ==
Prison inmates of the Islamic faith filed suit, alleging that two New Jersey prison policies violated their First Amendment right to freely exercise their religion by preventing them from attending Friday afternoon Muslim congregational services.

The first policy required inmates to work outside the buildings where they were housed and where the religious service was held. The second policy prohibited inmates assigned to outside work from returning to those buildings during the day.

The district court ruled that the policies did not violate the Constitution. On appeal, the U.S. Court of Appeals for the Third Circuit vacated the district court’s judgment and remanded the case for further proceedings.

== Opinion of the Court ==
The Court reversed the decision, with Justice Rehnquist delivering the majority opinion.

The Court held that the Circuit Court erred by placing the burden on prison officials to disprove the availability of alternatives and by failing to grant the deference the Constitution affords to prison administrators’ judgment. It also found that the two prison policies were “reasonably related to legitimate penological objectives” and were not in violation of the First Amendment. The Court stated that it would not substitute its judgment for that of prison administrators.
