= List of United States Supreme Court cases, volume 493 =

This is a list of all the United States Supreme Court cases from volume 493 of the United States Reports:

Case name	Citation	Date decided
Terrell v. Morris	493 U.S. 1	1989
White v. United States	493 U.S. 5	1989
Dismissed as improvidently granted. White dissented without an opinion.
Northbrook Nat'l Ins. Co. v. Brewer	493 U.S. 6	1989
Hallstrom v. Tillamook Cnty.	493 U.S. 20	1989
Citizens for Independent Press v. Thornburgh	493 U.S. 38	1989
Ches. & Ohio R. Co. v. Schwalb	493 U.S. 40	1989
United States v. Sperry Corp.	493 U.S. 52	1989
Breininger v. Sheet Metal Workers	493 U.S. 67	1989
Golden State Transit Corp. v. City of Los Angeles	493 U.S. 103	1989
Pavelic & LeFlore v. Cadence Industries Corp.	493 U.S. 120	1989
United States v. Goodyear Tire & Rubber Co.	493 U.S. 132	1989
John Doe Agency v. John Doe Corp.	493 U.S. 146	1989
Hoffmann-La Roche Inc. v. Sperling	493 U.S. 165	1989
University of Pennsylvania v. Equal Employment Opportunity Commission	493 U.S. 182	1990
Comm'r v. Indianapolis Power & Light Co.	493 U.S. 203	1990
FW/PBS, Inc. v. City Dallas	493 U.S. 215	1990
Spallone v. United States	493 U.S. 265	1990
James v. Illinois	493 U.S. 307	1990
Franchise Tax Bd. v. Alcan Aluminium Ltd.	493 U.S. 331	1990
Dowling v. United States	493 U.S. 342	1990
Guidry v. Sheet Metal Workers Nat. Pension Fund	493 U.S. 365	1990
Jimmy Swaggart Ministries v. Board of Equalization	493 U.S. 378	1990
W.S. Kirkpatrick & Co. v. Environmental Tectonics Corp.	493 U.S. 400	1990
FTC v. Super. Ct. Trial Lawyers Ass'n	493 U.S. 411	1990
Tafflin v. Levitt	493 U.S. 455	1990
Holland v. Illinois	493 U.S. 474	1990
Sullivan v. Zebley	493 U.S. 521	1990
Dept. of Social Servs. v. Bouknight	493 U.S. 549	1990
