= Board of Airport Commissioners of Los Angeles v. Jews for Jesus, Inc. =

- Supreme Court of the United States

Argued March 3, 1987 Decided June 15, 1987
- Full case name: Board of Airport Commissioners of Los Angeles v. Jews for Jesus, Inc.
- Citations: 482 U.S. 569 (more) 107 S. Ct. 2568; 96 L. Ed. 2d 500; 1987 U.S. LEXIS 2619; 55 U.S.L.W. 4855

Case history
- Prior: Cert. to the Circuit Court of Appeals for the Ninth Circuit

Holding
- A resolution banning all "First Amendment activities" at Los Angeles International Airport violates the First Amendment.

Court membership
- Chief Justice William Rehnquist Associate Justices William J. Brennan Jr. · Byron White; Thurgood Marshall · Harry Blackmun; Lewis F. Powell Jr. · John P. Stevens; Sandra Day O'Connor · Antonin Scalia

Case opinions
- Majority: O'Connor, joined by unanimous
- Concurrence: White, joined by Rehnquist

Laws applied
- U.S. Const. amend. I

Board of Airport Commissioners of Los Angeles v. Jews for Jesus, Inc., 482 U.S. 569 (1987), was a case in which the United States Supreme Court held that an ordinance prohibiting all "First Amendment activities" in the Los Angeles International Airport was facially unconstitutional due to its overbreadth.

== Background ==
In July 1984, Howard Snyder, a minister with the organization Jews for Jesus, was distributing religious leaflets in the Central Terminal Area at Los Angeles International Airport. An officer with the Department of Airports told Snyder that his activities violated a resolution adopted by the Board of Airport Commissioners and requested that he leave or be subject to legal action by the City. Snyder left the airport and Jews for Jesus later sued to challenge the constitutionality of the resolution.

== Decision of the Supreme Court ==
The unanimous opinion of the Court was written by Justice O'Connor. O'Connor wrote that the ordinance "reaches the universe of expressive activity, and, by prohibiting all protected expression, purports to create a virtual 'First Amendment Free Zone' at LAX". The Airport Commissioners argued that the ordinance would only be applied against activities that were related to the airport, but O'Connor pointed out that "wearing of a T-shirt or button that contains a political message" would still fall within the prohibition.

In a brief concurrence, Justice White expressed his concern that the decision did not address the question of whether the airport constituted a public forum.
