= List of United States Supreme Court cases, volume 500 =

This is a list of all the United States Supreme Court cases from volume 500 of the United States Reports:

Case name	Citation	Date decided
Stevens v. Department of the Treasury	500 U.S. 1	1991
In re Amendment to Rule 39	500 U.S. 13	1991
In re Demos	500 U.S. 16	1991
Gilmer v. Interstate/Johnson Lane Corp.	500 U.S. 20	1991
Riverside Cnty. v. McLaughlin	500 U.S. 44	1991
Int'l Primate Protection League v. Administrators of Tulane Ed. Fund	500 U.S. 72	1991
Kamen v. Kemper Fin. Serv., Inc.	500 U.S. 90	1991
Lankford v. Idaho	500 U.S. 110	1991
McCarthy v. Bronson	500 U.S. 136	1991
Michigan v. Lucas	500 U.S. 145	1991
Touby v. United States	500 U.S. 160	1991
Ford Motor Credit Co. v. Dept. of Revenue	500 U.S. 172	1991
Rust v. Sullivan	500 U.S. 173	1991
Siegert v. Gilley	500 U.S. 226	1991
Florida v. Jimeno	500 U.S. 248	1991
McCormick v. United States	500 U.S. 257	1991
Farrey v. Sanderfoot	500 U.S. 291	1991
Owen v. Owen	500 U.S. 305	1991
Summit Health, Ltd. v. Pinhas	500 U.S. 322	1991
Braxton v. United States	500 U.S. 344	1991
Hernandez v. New York	500 U.S. 352	1991
Illinois v. Kentucky	500 U.S. 380	1991
Yates v. Evatt	500 U.S. 391	1991
Mu'Min v. Virginia	500 U.S. 415	1991
Chapman v. United States	500 U.S. 453	1991
Burns v. Reed	500 U.S. 478	1991
Lehnert v. Ferris Faculty Ass'n	500 U.S. 507	1991
California v. Acevedo	500 U.S. 565	1991
Exxon Corp. v. Cent. Gulf Lines, Inc.	500 U.S. 603	1991
Edmonson v. Leesville Concrete Co.	500 U.S. 614	1991
Clark v. Roemer	500 U.S. 646	1991
