= List of United States Supreme Court cases, volume 482 =

This is a list of all United States Supreme Court cases from volume 482 of the United States Reports:

Case name	Citation	Date decided
Fort Halifax Packing Co. v. Coyne	482 U.S. 1	1987
Fall River Dyeing & Finishing Corp. v. NLRB	482 U.S. 27	1987
United States v. Hohri	482 U.S. 64	1987
Turner v. Safley	482 U.S. 78	1987
Commissioner v. Asphalt Products Co.	482 U.S. 117	1987
Texas v. New Mexico	482 U.S. 124	1987
Bowen v. Yuckert	482 U.S. 137	1987
Rockford Life Ins. Co. v. Illinois Dept. of Revenue	482 U.S. 182	1987
Utah Div. of State Lands v. United States	482 U.S. 193	1987
Shearson/American Express Inc. v. McMahon	482 U.S. 220	1987
ICC v. Locomotive Engineers	482 U.S. 270	1987
First English Evangelical Lutheran Church of Glendale v. County of Los Angeles	482 U.S. 304	1987
O'Lone v. Estate of Shabazz	482 U.S. 342	1987
Board of Pardons v. Allen	482 U.S. 369	1987
Caterpillar Inc. v. Williams	482 U.S. 386	1987
California v. Superior Court of Cal., San Bernardino Cty.	482 U.S. 400	1987
Miller v. Florida	482 U.S. 423	1987
Crawford Fitting Co. v. J. T. Gibbons, Inc.	482 U.S. 437	1987
Houston v. Hill	482 U.S. 451	1987
Perry v. Thomas	482 U.S. 483	1987
Booth v. Maryland	482 U.S. 496	1987
Société Nationale Industrielle Aérospatiale v. United States Dist. Court for Southern Dist. of Iowa	482 U.S. 522	1987
Board of Airport Comm'rs of Los Angeles v. Jews for Jesus, Inc.	482 U.S. 569	1987
Edwards v. Aguillard	482 U.S. 578	1987
Frazier v. Heebe	482 U.S. 641	1987
Goodman v. Lukens Steel Co.	482 U.S. 656	1987
New York v. Burger	482 U.S. 691	1987
Kentucky v. Stincer	482 U.S. 730	1987
Hewitt v. Helms	482 U.S. 755	1987
