= List of United States Supreme Court cases, volume 513 =

This is a list of all the United States Supreme Court cases from volume 513 of the United States Reports:

Case name	Citation	Date decided
In re Whitaker	513 U.S. 1	1994
Austin v. United States	513 U.S. 5	1994
United States v. Shabani	513 U.S. 10	1994
U.S. Bancorp Mortgage Co. v. Bonner Mall Partnership	513 U.S. 18	1994
Mootness by reason of settlement does not justify vacatur of a federal civil judgment after an appeal is filed. Conceivably, there may be some exceptional circumstances that would justify vacatur when mootness results from settlement, but the mere fact that the settlement agreement provides for vacatur is not sufficient.
Hess v. Port Authority Trans-Hudson Corporation	513 U.S. 30	1994
United States v. X-Citement Video, Inc.	513 U.S. 64	1994
Federal Election Comm'n v. NRA Political Victory Fund	513 U.S. 88	1994
The FEC may not independently file a petition for certiorari in this Court under 2 U.S.C. §437d(a)(6).
Reich v. Collins	513 U.S. 106	1994
Although due process, under McKesson, allows a state to maintain a remedial scheme that is exclusively pre deprivation, exclusively postdeprivation, or a hybrid, and to reconfigure its scheme over time to fit changing needs, it may not do a "bait and switch" by reconfiguring, unfairly, in midcourse.
Brown v. Gardner	513 U.S. 115	1994
Nebraska Dept. of Revenue v. Loewenstein	513 U.S. 123	1994
ICC v. Transcon Lines	513 U.S. 138	1995
Tome v. United States	513 U.S. 150	1995
Illinois v. Kentucky	513 U.S. 177	1995
Asgrow Seed Co. v. Winterboer	513 U.S. 179	1995
A farmer who meets the requirements set forth in § 2543's proviso may sell for reproductive purposes only such seed as he has saved for the purpose of replanting his own acreage.
United States v. Mezzanatto	513 U.S. 196	1995
An agreement to waive the plea-statement rules' exclusionary provisions is valid and enforceable absent some affirmative indication that the defendant entered the agreement unknowingly or involuntarily.
American Airlines, Inc. v. Wolens	513 U.S. 219	1995
The ADA's preemption prescription bars state-imposed regulation of air carriers, but allows room for court enforcement of contract terms set by the parties themselves.
NationsBank of N. C., N. A. v. Variable Annuity Life Ins. Co.	513 U.S. 251	1995
The Comptroller of the Currency's determination that national banks may serve as agents in the sale of annuities is a reasonable construction of the Act and therefore warrants judicial deference.
Allied-Bruce Terminix Cos. v. Dobson	513 U.S. 265	1995
The Federal Arbitration Act's requirement that a contract involve interstate commerce is to be broadly construed.
Schlup v. Delo	513 U.S. 298	1995
McKennon v. Nashville Banner Publishing Co.	513 U.S. 352	1995
An employee discharged in violation of the ADEA is not barred from all relief when, after their discharge, their employer discovers evidence of wrongdoing that, in any event, would have led to their termination on lawful and legitimate grounds had the employer known of it.
Duncan v. Henry	513 U.S. 364	1995
Lebron v. National Railroad Passenger Corp.	513 U.S. 374	1995
Milwaukee Brewery Workers' Pension Plan v. Jos. Schlitz Brewing Co.	513 U.S. 414	1995
MPPAA calculates its installment schedule on the assumption that interest begins accruing on the first day of the plan year following withdrawal.
O'Neal v. McAninch	513 U.S. 432	1995
When a federal habeas court finds a constitutional trial error and is in grave doubt about whether the error had a "substantial and injurious effect or influence in determining the jury's verdict," the error is not harmless, and the petitioner must win.
United States v. Treasury Employees	513 U.S. 454	1995
Federal civil servants have a First Amendment right to accept pay for speeches and articles in their capacities as citizens, and Congress cannot prohibit them from doing so.
Harris v. Alabama	513 U.S. 504	1995
Jerome B. Grubart, Inc. v. Great Lakes Dredge & Dock Co.	513 U.S. 527	1995
Anderson v. Green	513 U.S. 557	1995
Gustafson v. Alloyd Co.	513 U.S. 561	1995
Section 12(2) does not extend to a private sale contract, since a contract, and its recitations, that are not held out to the public are not a "prospectus" as the term is used in the Securities Act of 1933.
