= List of United States Supreme Court cases, volume 485 =

This is a list of all the United States Supreme Court cases from volume 485 of the United States Reports:

Case name	Citation	Date decided
Pennell v. San Jose	485 U.S. 1	1988
United States v. Robinson	485 U.S. 25	1988
Hustler Magazine, Inc. v. Falwell	485 U.S. 46	1988
Mathews v. United States	485 U.S. 58	1988
Bowen v. Galbreath	485 U.S. 74	1988
Peralta v. Heights Med. Center, Inc.	485 U.S. 80	1988
United States v. Louisiana	485 U.S. 88	1988
INS v. Abudu	485 U.S. 94	1988
City of St. Louis v. Praprotnik	485 U.S. 112	1988
Trans World Airlines, Inc. v. Flight Attendants	485 U.S. 175	1988
K Mart Corp. v. Cartier, Inc.	485 U.S. 176	1988
A Customs Service regulation, which permits the importation of foreign-made goods bearing an authorized US trademark, conflicts with the Tariff Act, which prohibits the importation of any such goods without the consent of the trademark owner.
Norwest Bank v. Ahlers	485 U.S. 197	1988
Ark. Best Corp. v. Comm'r	485 U.S. 212	1988
Basic Inc. v. Levinson	485 U.S. 224	1988
Haig v. Bissonette	485 U.S. 264	1988
Buchanan v. Stanships, Inc.	485 U.S. 265	1988
Gulfstream Aerospace Corp. v. Mayacamas Corp.	485 U.S. 271	1988
Schneidewind v. ANR Pipeline Co.	485 U.S. 293	1988
Boos v. Barry	485 U.S. 312	1988
Comm'r v. Bollinger	485 U.S. 340	1988
United States v. Wells Fargo Bank	485 U.S. 351	1988
Lyng v. Automobile Workers	485 U.S. 360	1988
Bowen v. Kizer	485 U.S. 386	1988
Texas v. New Mexico	485 U.S. 388	1988
Bennett v. Arksansas	485 U.S. 395	1988
Bethesda Hosp. Ass'n v. Bowen	485 U.S. 399	1988
FLRA v. Aberdeen Proving Ground	485 U.S. 409	1988
Gardebring v. Jenkins	485 U.S. 415	1988
Lyng v. Nw. Indian Cemetery Protective Ass'n	485 U.S. 439	1988
Tulsa Professional Collection Serv., Inc. v. Pope	485 U.S. 478	1988
Puerto Rico Dept. of Consumer Affairs v. ISLA Petroleum Corp.	485 U.S. 495	1988
South Carolina v. Baker	485 U.S. 505	1988
Traynor v. Turnage	485 U.S. 535	1988
Edward J. DeBartolo Corp. v. Florida Gulf Coast Building & Constr. Trades Council	485 U.S. 568	1988
Univ. of Cal. v. Public Employment Relations Bd.	485 U.S. 589	1988
Patterson v. McLean Credit Union	485 U.S. 617	1988
Hicks v. Feiock	485 U.S. 624	1988
Landers v. Nat'l R.R. Passenger Corp.	485 U.S. 652	1988
Employment Div. v. Smith	485 U.S. 660	1988
Postal Service v. Letter Carriers	485 U.S. 680	1988
Huddleston v. United States	485 U.S. 681	1988
United States v. Providence Journal Co.	485 U.S. 693	1988
Business Electronics Corp. v. Sharp Electronics Corp.	485 U.S. 717	1988
Kungys v. United States	485 U.S. 759	1988
