= United States Department of Justice v. Reporters Committee for Freedom of the Press =

- Supreme Court of the United States

Argued December 7, 1988 Decided March 22, 1989
- Full case name: United States Department of Justice, et al. v. Reporters Committee for Freedom of the Press, et al.
- Citations: 489 U.S. 749 (more) 109 S. Ct. 1468; 103 L. Ed. 2d 774; 57 U.S.L.W. 4373; 16 Media L. Rep. 1545

Case history
- Prior: 816 F.2d 730, opinion modified and rehearing denied, 831 F.2d 1124 (D.C. Cir. 1987) (reversed)

Holding
- Disclosure of the contents of an FBI rap-sheet to a third party "could reasonably be expected to constitute an unwarranted invasion of personal privacy" within the meaning of Exemption 7(C), and therefore is prohibited by that Exemption

Court membership
- Chief Justice William Rehnquist Associate Justices William J. Brennan Jr. · Byron White; Thurgood Marshall · Harry Blackmun; John P. Stevens · Sandra Day O'Connor; Antonin Scalia · Anthony Kennedy

Case opinions
- Majority: Stevens, joined by Rehnquist, White, Marshall, O'Connor, Scalia, Kennedy
- Concurrence: Blackmun (in judgment), joined by Brennan

Laws applied
- Freedom of Information Act

United States Department of Justice v. Reporters Committee for Freedom of the Press, 489 U.S. 749 (1989), was a case before the United States Supreme Court.

== Background ==
=== Facts ===
Journalists requested, under the Freedom of Information Act (United States) (FOIA), that the Department of Justice (DOJ) and the Federal Bureau of Investigation (FBI) disclose any criminal records in its possession concerning four brothers whose family company allegedly had obtained defense contracts through an improper arrangement with a corrupt Congressman. The Department released only the "rap sheet" of the fourth, deceased brother.

The journalists sued in District Court, limiting their request to documents containing information that was a matter of public record. While the suit was pending, two more of the brothers died, and the FBI (1) released the requested data concerning those brothers, (2) indicated that any financial crime information about the remaining brother could be disclosed in the public interest, but that no such information existed, and (3) refused to release any rap sheet or other records containing nonfinancial criminal information about him.

=== District Court ===
The District Court, granting the Department's motion for summary judgment after an in camera review of the requested information, held that such information was exempted from FOIA's disclosure requirements by various FOIA provisions, including Exemption 7(C) (5 USCS 552(b)(7)(C)), which applies to investigatory records compiled for law enforcement purposes where production of such records could reasonably be expected to constitute an unwarranted invasion of personal privacy.

=== D.C. Circuit ===
The United States Court of Appeals for the District of Columbia Circuit reversed and remanded, holding that

(1) Exemption 7(C) was inapplicable, because, in the absence of any statutory standards by which to judge the public interest in disclosure, a court should be bound by state and local determinations that such information should be made available to the general public, and
(2) no other FOIA exemptions were applicable.

Accordingly, the Court of Appeals directed the District Court to determine, on remand, whether the withheld information was publicly available at its source, and if so, whether the Department might satisfy its statutory obligation by referring the journalists to the enforcement agency or agencies that had provided the original information.

=== D.C. Circuit rehearing ===
On rehearing, the Court of Appeals, modifying its holding, said that most state policies in fact did not favor disclosure of rap sheets, but that the District Court should nonetheless make a factual determination whether the remaining brother's privacy interest in his rap-sheet information had faded because such information appeared on the public record. The Court of Appeals subsequently denied rehearing en banc.

=== Issue ===
The Supreme Court accepted the case on certiorari to resolve whether disclosure of the rap sheet constituted an unwarranted invasion of privacy within the meaning of 5 U.S.C.S. § 552(b)(7)(C).

== Opinion of the Court ==
The Supreme Court reversed. In an opinion by Justice Stevens, joined by Chief Justice Rehnquist and Justices White, Marshall, O'Connor, Scalia and Kennedy, it was held that

(1) while a court must balance the public interest in disclosure of criminal records against the individual privacy interests protected by Exemption 7(C), a categorical balance may properly be undertaken, and individual circumstances may properly be disregarded, when the case fits into a genus in which the balance characteristically tips in one direction;
(2) as a categorical matter, the granting of a third party's FOIA request for the disclosure of law enforcement records or information about a private citizen can reasonably be expected to invade that citizen's privacy for the purpose of Exemption 7(C), and when such a request seeks no official information about a Federal Government agency, but merely seeks records that the Federal Government happens to be storing, the invasion of privacy is "unwarranted" for the purpose of Exemption 7(C); and
(3) in any event the public interest in the release of the requested information about the remaining brother was not the type of interest protected by FOIA, because--although there is some public interest in anyone's criminal history, especially if the history is in some way related to the subject's dealing with a public official or agency--FOIA's central purpose is to insure that the Federal Government's activities be opened to public scrutiny, not that information about private citizens that happens to be in the Federal Government's warehouse be so disclosed, and the release of information as to the brother's past arrests or convictions would tell nothing directly about the character of the Congressman's behavior or about the conduct of the Defense Department in awarding contracts to the brother's company.

The Court held that the fact that an event was not wholly "private" did not mean that an individual had no interest in limiting its disclosure. The privacy interest in a rap sheet was substantial. Whether an invasion of privacy was warranted had to turn on the nature of the requested document and its relationship to the basic purpose of the FOIA, which focused on the citizen's right to be informed about the government's actions. The news groups in this case did not intend to discover anything about the conduct of the agency, and response to the request would not shed any light on the agency's conduct. Thus, the public interest in release of a rap sheet was not the type of interest protected by the FOIA. The Court held, as a categorical matter under § 552(b)(7)(C), that a third party's request for law enforcement records about a private citizen could reasonably be expected to invade that citizen's privacy, and that when the request sought no official information about the government, the privacy invasion was unwarranted.

=== Concurrence ===
Justice Blackmun, joined by Brennan, concurred in the judgment. He felt that

(1) the court's use of categorical balancing under Exemption 7(C) was not basically sound, and
(2) Exemption 7(C) should not be interpreted as exempting all rap-sheet information from FOIA's disclosure requirements, but
(3) even a more flexible balancing approach would still require reversing the Court of Appeals in the case at bar.

== See also ==
- List of United States Supreme Court cases, volume 489
