= Marriage in the United States =

Overview of the aspects of marriage in United States

Marriage in the United States is a legal, social, and religious institution. The marriage age is set by each state and territory, either by statute or the common law applies. An individual may marry without parental consent or other authorization on reaching 18 years of age in all states except in Nebraska (where the general marriage age is 19) and Mississippi (where the general marriage age is 21.) In Puerto Rico the general marriage age is also 21. In all these jurisdictions, these are also the ages of majority. In Alabama, however, the age of majority is 19, while the general marriage age is 18. Most states also set a lower age at which underage persons are able to marry with parental or judicial consent.

Marriage laws have changed considerably over time, including the removal of bans on interracial marriage and same-sex marriage. In 2009, there were 2,077,000 marriages, according to the U.S. Census Bureau. The median age for the first marriage has increased in recent years. The median age in the early 1970s was 23 for men and 21 for women; and it rose to 28 for men and 26 for women by 2009 and by 2017, it was 29.5 for men and 27.4 for women.

Marriages vary considerably in terms of religion, socioeconomic status, age, commitment, and so forth. Reasons for marrying may include a desire to have children, love, or economic security. Marriage has been in some instances used for the sole purpose of gaining a green card or facilitating full citizenship; the Immigration Marriage Fraud Amendments of 1986 are among laws that are used to prevent their recognition for immigration purposes, and a marriage visa can be obtained in advance of entry of the non-national where there is a long-term, committed relationship demonstrable. In 2003, 184,741 immigrants were admitted as spouses of US citizens.

Marriages can be terminated by annulment, divorce or death of a spouse. Divorce (known as dissolution of marriage in some states) laws vary by state, and address issues such as how the two spouses bifurcate their property, how children will be cared for, and support obligations of one spouse toward the other. Since the late 1960s, divorce has become more prevalent. Divorce rates in 2005 were four times the divorce rates in 1955, and a quarter of children less than 16 years old were raised by a stepparent. Divorce rates peaked in 1979, and had dropped by more than a third by the early 2020s. In 2009, it was found that marriages that end in divorce lasted for a median of 8 years. As a rough rule, marriage has more legal ramifications than other types of bonds between consenting adults. Domestic partnerships are a form of civil union with registration and recognition being functions of states, localities, or employers; such unions may be available to couples of the same sex or opposite sex. Couples without any legal union may engage in cohabitation.

== Interjurisdictional recognition ==
All U.S. jurisdictions recognize all validly contracted out-of-state marriages under their laws of comity and choice of law/conflict of laws rules - including marriages that cannot be legally contracted domestically. Likewise, an invalidly contracted out-of-state marriage will not be valid domestically, even if it could have been validly contracted domestically. For example, California allows first cousins to marry but Nevada does not. If two first cousins attempt to marry in Nevada, that marriage will not be valid in either Nevada or California, notwithstanding it could be legally contracted in California. But if they attempt to marry in California, their attempt will be successful and the marriage will be valid in both California and Nevada, notwithstanding the marriage could not be legally contracted in Nevada. This may lead to jurisdiction shopping.

== History ==
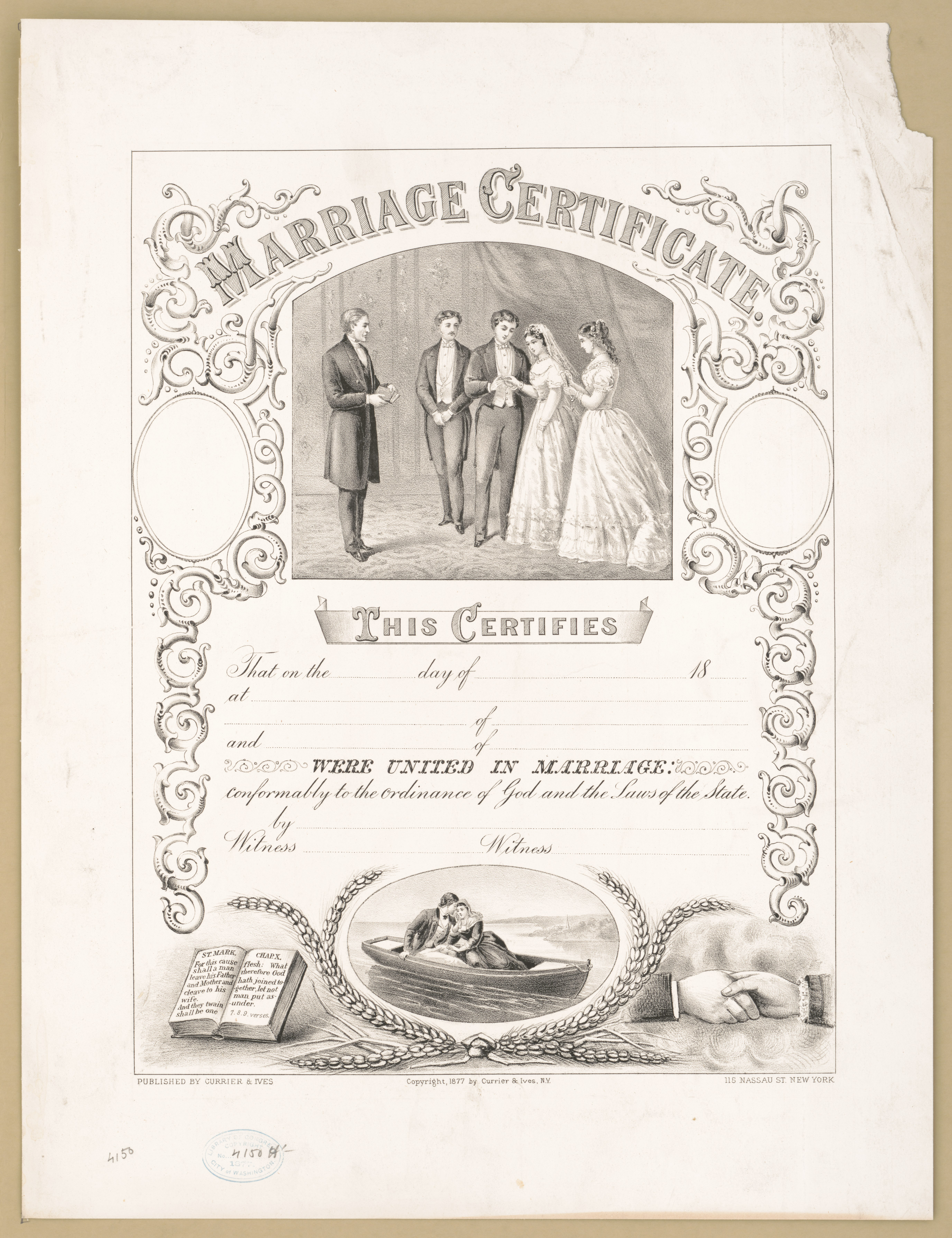
A Marriage Certificate issued in the US in 1877

The marriage between Luisa de Abrego, a free black domestic servant from Seville and Miguel Rodríguez, a white Segovian conquistador in 1565 in St. Augustine (Spanish Florida), is the first known and recorded Christian marriage anywhere in what is now the continental United States.

When the country was founded in the 1770s, marriage between whites and non-whites was in many states forbidden due to the racist attitudes of the time. Nine states, including the most recent two, never passed any law clearly forbidding such a marriage. In 1948, the California Supreme Court became the first state high court to declare the state's ban on interracial marriage unconstitutional. In 1967, the U.S. Supreme Court unanimously rendered unenforceable remaining interracial marriage laws – these had been applicable in sixteen states forming the south-east of the United States – in Loving v. Virginia. It struck down the law directly in that state. In 2000, Alabama became the last state to adapt its laws to the Supreme Court's decision, when 60% of voters endorsed a ballot initiative that removed anti-miscegenation language from the state constitution.

Expectations of a marriage partner have changed over time. Second U.S. President John Adams wrote in his diary that the ideal spouse was willing to "palliate faults and mistakes, to put the best construction upon words and actions, and to forgive injuries". A 1940 paper by a sociology professor at the University of Pennsylvania reported that male students resisted the idea of marrying a girl who they suspected had sex with another man. The sexual revolution in 1960s United States altered this norm for many.

The proportion of Americans age 25–50 who had never married rose from 9% in 1970 to 35% in 2018. They also increasingly find themselves in a household without a partner: the proportion of Americans age 25–54 who were not currently living with a partner (whether married or unmarried) rose from 29% in 1990 to 38% in 2019. Susan Brown, co-director of the National Center for Family and Marriage Research, said the number of women marrying for the first time between the ages of 40 and 59 has increased 75 percent since 1990.

== Demographics ==
=== Marital status by age group in 2004 ===
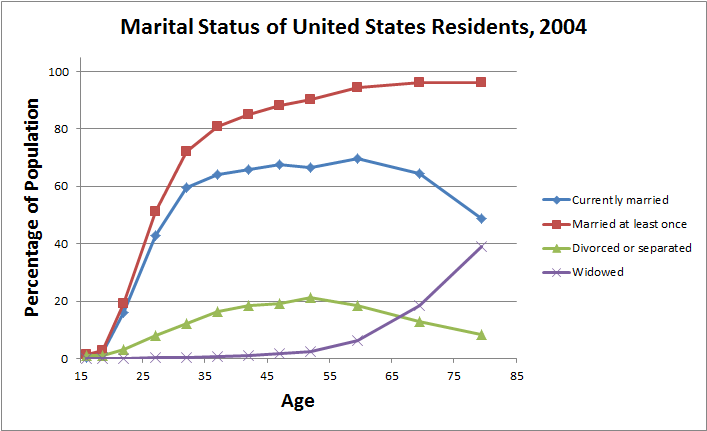
Marital status of residents of the United States of America in 2004

In 2004 the U.S. Census Bureau measured the marital status of U.S. residents, showing several trends. While about 96% of residents in their 70s and 80s were married at least once, many were widowed due to the death of their spouses. In addition, a large portion of middle-aged Americans are either divorced, legally separated, or informally separated. Of those who were "separated or divorced," approximately 74% were legally divorced, 15% were "separated," and 11% were listed as having an "absent spouse".

=== Marital status in the U.S. in the year 2000 ===
The four maps on the right shows the pattern of married, widowed, separated, and divorced households in the United States in the year 2000. The map on the bottom left shows that the west coast had the highest percentages of households to go through divorce. According to the map bottom right of the census chart the south east coast and New Orleans had the highest percentage of separated houses in the U.S. The northeast had the highest percentages of marriages. The highest percentages of widowed households was in the Midwest.

=== Trends and census data of 2006–2021 ===
Since the 1950s, the median age at first marriage in the US has increased by over eight years.

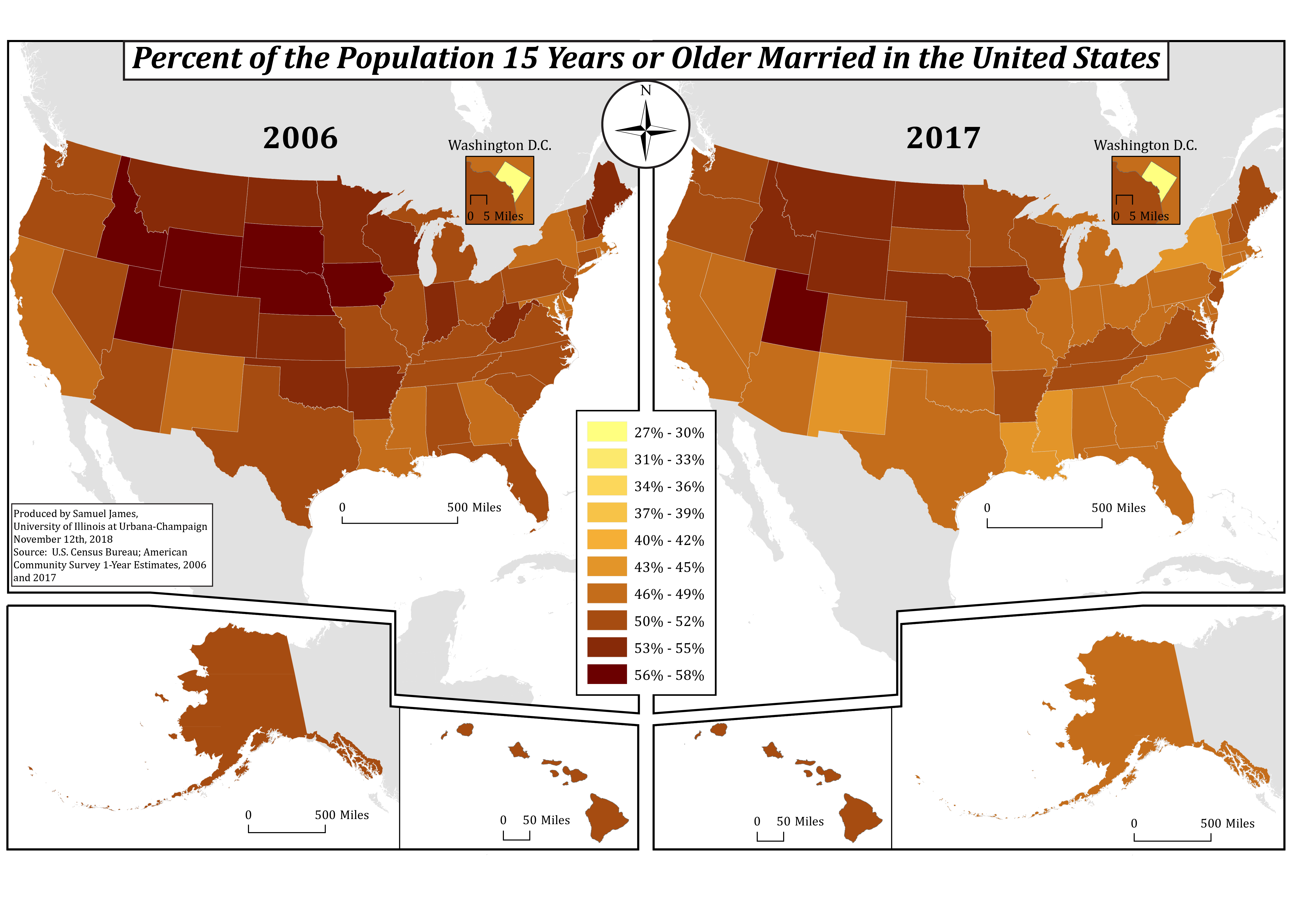
A map comparing the distributions of marriage in 2006 and 2017 of the population 15 years or older by state in the United States.

As of 2006, 55.7% of Americans age 18 and over were married. According to the 2008–2010 American Community Survey 3-Year Estimates, 51.5% of males and 47.7% of females over the age of 15 were married. The separation rate was 1.8% for males and 2.5% for females. Rates of marriage are falling rapidly in the US.

African Americans have married the least of all of the predominant ethnic groups in the U.S. with a 29.9% marriage rate, but have the highest separation rate which is 4.5%. Native Americans have the second lowest marriage rate with 37.9%. Hispanics have a 45.1% marriage rate, with a 3.5% separation rate.

In the United States, the two ethnic groups with the highest marriage rates included Asians with 58.5% and Whites with 52.9%. Asians have the lowest rate of divorce among the main groups with 1.8%. Whites, African Americans, and Native Americans have the highest rates of being widowed ranging from 5%–6.5%. They also have the highest rates of divorce among the three, ranging from 11%–13% with Native Americans having the highest divorce rate.

The median age for Americans' first marriage has risen in recent decades, with the median age at first marriage in the early 1970s being 21 for women and 23 for men, and as of 2024, it had risen to 29 for women and 30 for men.

In 2009, 2,077,000 marriages occurred in the United States. From that point on, though, a Pew study found that the number of new marriages declined 5% in just one year (that is, from 2009 to 2010).

According to the 2010 U.S. Census Bureau, the average family income is higher than previous years at $62,770. The percentage of family households below the poverty line in 2011 was 15.1%, higher than in 2000 when it was 11.3%. According to a report in 2013, the percentage of heterosexual couples who marry has fallen dramatically, but couples who marry are more likely to have college degrees and higher income than those who do not marry. Some commentators suggest that marriage in twenty-first century America has become a luxury good.

Studies show that the number of working-age Americans without a partner is on the rise, and a growing number of young people are living together without marriage. Experts often link the long-term decline in marriages to gender equality, financial independence and education. The national marriage rate fell to 5.1 per 1,000 in 2020 due to the Covid-19 pandemic, the lowest level in 121 years. By 2021, new marriages had almost returned to pre-pandemic levels. 6.0 per 1000 people.

Since the 2010s, the rate of ideological heterogamy has increased dramatically, from about 6 percent in the 1970s to 22 percent today. For every young liberal woman today there are only 0.6 single young liberal men. Likewise, there are only 0.5 unmarried young conservative women for every young conservative man. Statistically, about half of these ideologically minded young singles face the prospect of not being able to find a partner who shares their politics.

== Sociology of marriage ==
=== Types of marriage ===
Monogamy is when one person marries one other person and is the most common and accepted form of marriage in the United States. Serial monogamy is when individuals are permitted to marry again, often on the death of the first spouse or after divorce; they cannot have more than one spouse at one time because that would be polygamy which in countries with marital monogamy like the US is called bigamy. Polygamy is a form of marriage in which someone marries multiple people at a given time, and is illegal throughout the U.S. Part of the function of looking at marriage from a sociological perspective is to give insight into the reasons behind various marital arrangements.

=== Reasons for marriage ===
There are several reasons that Americans marry. The desire to have children is one; having a family is a high priority among many Americans. People also desire love, companionship, commitment, continuity, and permanence. There are some reasons for marriage that are ephemeral. These reasons include social legitimacy, social pressure, the desire for a high social status, economic security, rebellion or revenge, or validation of an unplanned pregnancy.

== Law ==
Marriage laws are established by individual states. There are two methods of receiving state recognition of a marriage: common-law marriage and obtaining a marriage license. Common-law marriage is no longer permitted in most states. Though federal law does not regulate state marriage law, it does provide for rights and responsibilities of married couples that differ from those of unmarried couples. Reports published by the General Accounting Office in 1997 and 2004 identified over 1000 such laws.

=== Marriage as a fundamental right ===
The United States Supreme Court has in at least 15 cases since 1888 ruled that marriage is a fundamental right. These cases are:

1. Maynard v. Hill, 125 U.S. 190 (1888) Marriage is "the most important relation in life" and "the foundation of the family and society, without which there would be neither civilization nor progress".
2. Meyer v. Nebraska, 262 U.S. 390 (1923) The right "to marry, establish a home and bring up children" is a central part of liberty protected by the Due Process Clause.
3. Skinner v. Oklahoma ex rel. Williamson, 316 U.S. 535 (1942) Marriage is "one of the basic civil rights of man" and "fundamental to the very existence and survival of the race".
4. Griswold v. Connecticut, 381 U.S. 479 (1965) "We deal with a right of privacy older than the Bill of Rights—older than our political parties, older than our school system. Marriage is a coming together for better or for worse, hopefully enduring, and intimate to the degree of being sacred. It is an association that promotes a way of life, not causes; a harmony in living, not political faiths; a bilateral loyalty, not commercial or social projects. Yet it is an association for as noble a purpose as any involved in our prior decisions."
5. Loving v. Virginia, 388 U.S. 1 (1967) "The freedom to marry has long been recognized as one of the vital personal rights essential to the orderly pursuit of happiness by free men."
6. Boddie v. Connecticut, 401 U.S. 371 (1971) "[M]arriage involves interests of basic importance to our society" and is "a fundamental human relationship".
7. Cleveland Board of Education v. LaFleur, 414 U.S. 632 (1974) "This Court has long recognized that freedom of personal choice in matters of marriage and family life is one of the liberties protected by the Due Process Clause of the Fourteenth Amendment."
8. Moore v. City of East Cleveland, 431 U.S. 494 (1977) "[W]hen the government intrudes on choices concerning family living arrangements, this Court must examine carefully the importance of the governmental interests advanced and the extent to which they are served by the challenged regulation".
9. Carey v. Population Services International, 431 U.S. 678 (1977) "[I]t is clear that among the decisions that an individual may make without unjustified government interference are personal decisions relating to marriage, procreation, contraception, family relationships, and child rearing and education".
10. Zablocki v. Redhail, 434 U.S. 374 (1978) "[T]he right to marry is of fundamental importance for all individuals".
11. Turner v. Safley, 482 U.S. 78 (1987) "[T]he decision to marry is a fundamental right" and an "expression[ ] of emotional support and public commitment".
12. Planned Parenthood of Southeastern Pennsylvania v. Casey, 505 U.S. 833 (1992) "Our law affords constitutional protection to personal decisions relating to marriage, procreation, contraception, family relationships, child rearing, and education. [...] These matters, involving the most intimate and personal choices a person may make in a lifetime, choices central to personal dignity and autonomy, are central to the liberty protected by the Fourteenth Amendment. At the heart of liberty is the right to define one's own concept of existence, of meaning, of the universe, and of the mystery of human life."
13. M.L.B. v. S.L.J., 519 U.S. 102 (1996) "Choices about marriage, family life, and the upbringing of children are among associational rights this Court has ranked as 'of basic importance in our society,' rights sheltered by the Fourteenth Amendment against the State's unwarranted usurpation, disregard, or disrespect."
14. Lawrence v. Texas, 539 U.S. 558 (2003) "[O]ur laws and tradition afford constitutional protection to personal decisions relating to marriage, procreation, contraception, family relationships, and education. ... Persons in a homosexual relationship may seek autonomy for these purposes, just as heterosexual persons do."
15. Obergefell v. Hodges, 576 U.S. 644 (2015) "[T]he right to marry is a fundamental right inherent in the liberty of the person, and under the Due Process and Equal Protection Clauses of the Fourteenth Amendment couples of the same-sex may not be deprived of that right and that liberty".

=== Age of marriage ===
The age at which a person can marry varies by state. The marriage age is generally 18 years, with the exception of Nebraska (19) and Mississippi (21). In addition, 37 states allow minors to marry in certain circumstances, such as parental consent, judicial consent, pregnancy, or a combination of these situations. Most states allow minors aged 16 and 17 to marry with parental consent alone. In four states, there is no statutory minimum age if other legal conditions are met. All other states have set an absolute minimum age by statute, which varies between 15 and 18. Between 2003 and 2018, more than 200,000 minors married in the US, and in Tennessee a 10-year-old girl was married in 2001, before the state set a minimum age of 17 in 2018.

The U.S. is the only UN member state that has not yet ratified the Convention on the Rights of the Child. Its Committee on the Rights of the Child "reaffirms that the minimum age limit should be 18 years for marriage".

=== Restrictions and expansions of marriage ===
Marriage has been restricted over the course of the history of the United States according race, sexual orientation, number of parties entering into the marriage, and familial relationships.

==== Common-law marriage ====
Eight states and the District of Columbia recognize common-law marriages. Once they meet the requirements of the respective state, couples in those recognized common-law marriages are considered legally married for all purposes and in all circumstances. Common-law marriage can be contracted in Colorado, Iowa, Kansas, Montana, Rhode Island, South Carolina, Texas, Utah, and the District of Columbia. Common-law marriage may also be valid under military law for purposes of a bigamy prosecution under the Uniform Code of Military Justice. (Note: See "United States v. Juillerat, ACM 206-06 (A.F.C.C.A. 2016)" (PDF). Court of Criminal Appeals. United States Airforce. A ceremonial marriage had been declared invalid by the state because it was not filed as required by law, but the marriage was treated as valid under military law such that the servicemember was convicted of bigamy.)

All U.S. jurisdictions recognize common-law marriages that were validly contracted in the originating jurisdiction, because they are valid marriages in the jurisdiction where they were contracted, because of the Full Faith and Credit Clause. However, absent legal registration or similar notice of the marriage, the parties to a common law marriage or their eventual heirs may have difficulty proving their relationship to be marriage. Some states provide for registration of an informal or common-law marriage based on the declaration of each of the spouses on a state-issued form.

==== Marriage law and race ====
Anti-miscegenation laws which prohibited interracial marriage date back to Colonial America. The earliest were established in Maryland and Virginia in the 1660s. After independence, seven of the original colonies and many new states, particularly those in the West and the South, also implemented anti-miscegenation laws. Despite a number of repeals in the 19th century, in 1948, 30 out of 48 states enforced prohibitions against interracial marriage. A number of these laws were repealed between 1948 and 1967. In 1948, the California Supreme Court ruled the Californian anti-miscegenation statute unconstitutional in Perez v. Sharp. Many other states repealed their laws in the following decade, with the exception of states in the South. In 1967, the U.S. Supreme Court declared all anti-miscegenation laws unconstitutional in Loving v. Virginia.

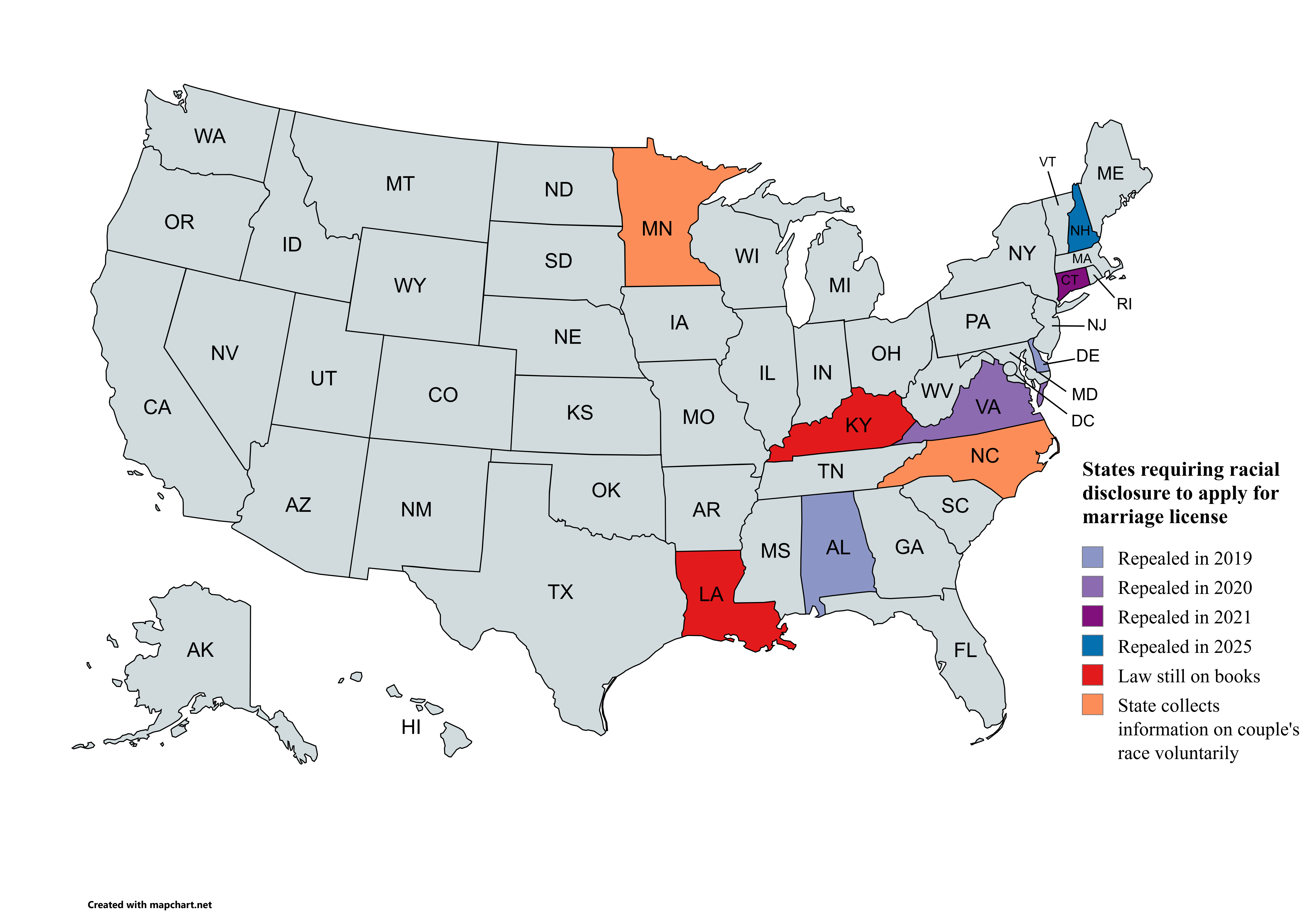
States requiring race disclosure for marriage license

As at 7 September 2019, seven states required couples to declare their racial background when applying for a marriage license, without which they cannot marry. The states are Connecticut, Delaware, Kentucky, Louisiana, Minnesota, New Hampshire and Alabama. After a lawsuit against Virginia's law by three couples, Virginia Attorney General Mark Herring removed the question from future licenses on September 14, 2019. The law was ruled unconstitutional by a District Court on October 11, 2019, and the law was repealed by the Virginia General Assembly on March 10, 2020.

==== Marriage law and sexual orientation ====
For much of the United States's history, marriage was restricted to heterosexual couples. Marriage licenses were issued to gay male couples Michael McConnell and Jack Baker in 1970 and Billie Ert and Antonio Molina in 1972, but both marriages were declared invalid by courts afterwards. In 1993, three same-sex couples challenged the legality Hawaii's statute prohibiting gay marriage in the lawsuit Baehr v. Miike. The case brought same-sex marriage to national attention and spurred the creation of the Defense of Marriage Act (DOMA) in 1996, which denied federal recognition of same-sex marriages and defined marriage to be between one man and one woman. In 2013, the United States Supreme Court ruled that Section 3 of DOMA was unconstitutional in the case of United States v. Windsor.

In 2004, Massachusetts became the first state to issue marriage licenses to same-sex couples. In reaction, many states took measures to define marriage as existing between one man and one woman. By 2012, 31 states had amended their constitutions to prevent same-sex marriage, and 6 had legalized it. Bolstered by the repeal of DOMA, an additional 30 states legalized same-sex marriage between 2012 and 2015. On June 26, 2015, the U.S. Supreme Court declared all state bans on same-sex marriage unconstitutional in Obergefell v. Hodges.

==== Polygamy ====
Polygamy (or bigamy) is illegal in all 50 states, as well as the District of Columbia, Guam, and Puerto Rico. Bigamy is punishable by a fine, imprisonment, or both, according to the law of the individual state and the circumstances of the offense. Because state laws exist, polygamy is not actively prosecuted at the federal level, but the practice is considered "against public policy" and, accordingly, the U.S. government does not recognize bigamous marriages for immigration purposes (that is, would not allow one of the spouses to petition for immigration benefits for the other), even if they are legal in the country where a bigamous marriage was celebrated. Any immigrant coming to the United States to practice polygamy will not be admitted.

Many U.S. courts (e.g. Turner v. S., 212 Miss. 590, 55 So.2d 228) treat bigamy as a strict liability crime: in some jurisdictions, a person can be convicted of a felony even if he or she reasonably believed he or she had only one legal spouse. For example, a person who mistakenly believes that their spouse is dead or that their divorce is final can still be convicted of bigamy if they marry a different person.

Polygamy became a significant social and political issue in the United States in 1852, when the Church of Jesus Christ of Latter-day Saints (LDS Church) made it known that a form of the practice, called plural marriage, was part of its doctrine. Opposition to the practice by the United States government resulted in an intense legal conflict, and resulted in it being outlawed in the territories by the Edmunds Act in 1882. The LDS Church president Wilford Woodruff announced the church's official abandonment of the practice on September 25, 1890. (Note: Woodruff's declaration was formally accepted in a church general conference on October 6, 1890.) However, breakaway Mormon fundamentalist groups living mostly in the western United States, Canada, and Mexico still practice plural marriage.

Some other Americans practice polygamy including some American Muslims.

==== Other restrictions ====
Marriage between first cousins is illegal in most states. However, it is legal in some states, the District of Columbia and some territories. Some states have some restrictions or exceptions for first-cousin marriages or recognize such marriages performed in other states.

== Marriage and immigration ==
According to the U.S. Census Bureau "Every year over 450,000 United States citizens marry foreign-born individuals and petition for them to obtain a permanent residency (Green Card) in the United States." In 2003, 184,741 immigrants were admitted to the U.S. as spouses of U.S. citizens.

There are conditional requirements in order to obtain a green card through the marriage process. The prospect must have a conditional green card. This becomes permanent after approval by the government. The candidate may then apply for United States citizenship.

A conditional residence green card is given to applicants who are being processed for permanent residence in the United States because they are married to a U.S. citizen. It is valid for two years. At the end of this time period if the card holder does not change the status of their residency they will be put on "out of status". Legal action by the government may follow.

There are different procedures based on whether the applicant is already a U.S. citizen or if the applicant is an immigrant. The marriage must also be legal in, if appropriate, the emigrant's country.

=== Immigration Marriage Fraud Amendments of 1986 ===
Public Law 99-639 (Act of 11/10/86) was passed to deter marriage fraud among immigrants. The United States Citizenship and Immigration Services summarizes the law and its implications: "Its major provision stipulates that aliens deriving their immigrant status based on a marriage of less than two years are conditional immigrants. To remove their conditional status the immigrants must apply at a U.S. Citizenship and Immigration Services office during the 90-day period before their second-year anniversary of receiving conditional status. If the aliens cannot show that the marriage through which the status was obtained was and is a valid one, their conditional immigrant status may be terminated and they may become deportable."

The conditional immigration status can be terminated for several causes, including divorce, invalid marriage, and failure to petition Immigration Services to remove the classification of conditional residency. If Immigration Services suspects that an alien has created a fraudulent marriage the immigrant is subject to removal from the United States. The marriage must be fraudulent at its inception, as can be determined by several factors. The factors include the conduct of parties before and after the marriage, and the bride and groom's intention of establishing a life together. The validity must be proved by the couple by showing insurance policies, property, leases, income tax, bank accounts, etc. Cases are decided by determining whether the sole purpose of the marriage was to gain benefits for the immigrant.

The punishment for fraud can be up to five years in prison and a fine of up to $250,000, or both and the possibility of never becoming a permanent resident of the United States. The U.S. citizen or resident spouse could also face criminal prosecution, including fines or imprisonment. They could be prosecuted for either criminal conspiracy or for establishing a "commercial enterprise" to fraudulently acquire green cards for immigrants.

These Amendment Acts cover spouses, children of spouses, and K-1 visa fiancés.

=== Basic immigration law ===
The Immigration and Nationality Act of 1952 has been amended many times, but still remains the basic and central body of immigration law.

=== Intersection of immigration law and family law ===
Immigrants who use the reason of family ties to gain entry into the United States are required to document financial arrangements. The sponsor of a related immigrant must guarantee financial support to the immigrant. These guarantees form a contract between a sponsor and the federal government. It requires the sponsor to support the immigrant relative at a level equivalent to 125% of the poverty line for his or her household size. A beneficiary of the contract, the immigrant, or the Federal Government may sue for the promised support in the event the sponsor does not fulfill the obligations of the contract. The sponsor is also liable for the prevailing party's legal expenses.

Divorce does not end the sponsor's obligation to provide the support deemed by the contract. The obligation terminates only when the immigrant spouse becomes a U.S. citizen, the immigrant spouse has worked forty Social Security Act eligible quarters (10 years), the immigrant spouse ceases to be a lawful permanent resident and has left the U.S., the immigrant spouse obtained an ability to adjust their status through another method, or the immigrant spouse dies. A sponsor's death also cuts off the obligation, but not in regards to any support the sponsor already owes which will be paid by the sponsor's estate.

=== Mail-order bride and immigration fraud ===
A mail-order bride is a foreign woman who contacts American men and immigrates for the purpose of marriage.

Initially, it was conducted through mailed catalogs, but now, more often, on the internet. As of 1997, prospective brides were typically from developing nations such as South/Southeast Asia, the Philippines, Thailand, Sri Lanka, India, Macao, Hong Kong, and China. Brides from Eastern European countries were also in demand. The mail-order bride phenomenon can be traced as far back as the 1700s and 1800s. This was due to the immigration of European colonizers who were in far away areas and wanted brides from their homeland.

It is speculated that some foreign women marry men in their country as an easy immigration route, staying married long enough to secure permanent citizenship, and then divorcing their husbands. Whether the brides choose to remain married or not, they could still sponsor the rest of their families to immigrate. The United States addressed the mail-order bride system by passing the Immigration Marriage Fraud Amendment of 1986.

=== Lesbian, gay, bisexual, and transgender immigrants ===
In 2000, 36,000 same-sex bi-national couples were living in the United States. A majority of these couples were raising young children. Female couples head 58% of bi-national families; 33% are male couples.

==== History ====
The revision of American immigration law imposed a ban on homosexual people beginning in 1952. The language barred "aliens afflicted with psychopathic personality, epilepsy or mental defect". Congress explicitly intended this language to cover "homosexuals and sex perverts". The law was amended in 1965 to more specifically prohibit the entry of persons "afflicted with... sexual deviation". Until 1990, "sexual deviation" was grounds for exclusion from the United States, and anyone who admitted being a homosexual was refused entry. Lesbian and gay individuals are now admitted and US citizens may petition for immigrant visas for their same-sex spouses under the same terms as opposite-sex spouses.

==== Boutilier v. Immigration Service, 1967 ====
In 1967, the Supreme Court confirmed that, when describing a homosexual person, they were to be referred to as a "psychopathic personality". Twenty-one-year-old Clive Boutilier, a Canadian, had moved to the United States in 1955 to join his mother, stepfather, and 3 siblings who already lived there. In 1963, he applied for US citizenship, admitting that he had been arrested on a sodomy charge in 1959. He was ordered to be deported. He challenged his deportation until it became a federal matter and became a case for the Supreme Court. In a six-three decision, the court ruled that Congress had decided to bar gay people from entering the United States: "Congress was not laying down a clinical test, but an exclusionary standard which it declared to be inclusive of those having homosexual and perverted characteristics..." Congress used the phrase 'psychopathic personality' not in the clinical sense, but to effectuate its purpose to exclude from entry all homosexuals and other sex perverts." Boutilier was torn from his partner of eight years. According to one historian, "Presumably distraught about the Court's Decision... Boutillier attempted suicide before leaving New York, survived a month-long coma that left him brain-damaged with permanent disabilities, and moved to southern Ontario with his parents, who took on the task of caring for him for more than twenty years". He died in Canada on April 12, 2003, only weeks before that country moved to legalize same-sex marriage.

Even with the ban being enforced, homosexual people still managed to come to the United States for several reasons, but especially to be with the people they loved. The fight to allow homosexual immigrants into the United States continued in the mid-1970s with an Australian national named Anthony Sullivan. He was living in Boulder, Colorado, with his American partner, Richard Adams. When Sullivan's visitor's visa was about to expire, they managed to persuade the county clerk to issue them a marriage license, with which Sullivan applied for a green card as Adams' spouse. They received a negative reply from the Immigration and Naturalization Service. Sullivan and Adams sued, and in 1980, the Ninth Circuit Court of Appeals concluded that because Congress intended to restrict the term "spouse" to opposite-sex couples, and because Congress has extensive power to limit access to immigration benefits, the denial was lawful. The ban was finally repealed in 1990, but without making any provision for gays and lesbians to be treated equally with regard to family-based immigration sponsorship. Sponsorship became possible only after the 2013 US Supreme Court decision in United States v. Windsor that struck down a provision to the contrary in the Defense of Marriage Act.

== Divorce ==
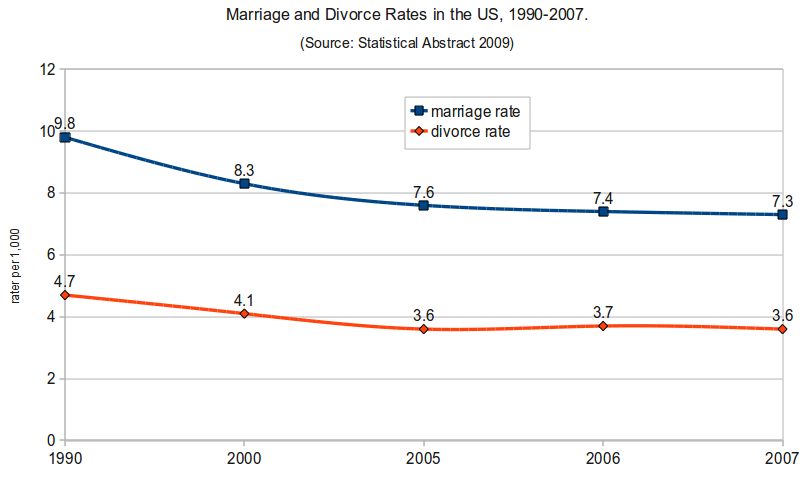
Marriage and divorce rates in the US 1990–2007

Divorce is the province of state governments, so divorce law varies from state to state. Prior to the 1970s, divorcing spouses had to prove that the other spouse was at fault, for instance for being guilty of adultery, abandonment, or cruelty; when spouses simply could not get along, lawyers were forced to manufacture "uncontested" divorces. No-fault divorce (on the grounds of "irreconcilable differences", "irretrievable breakdown of marriage", "incompatibility", or after a separation period etc.) gradually became available in all states beginning with California in 1969 and ending with New York in 2010. State law provides for child support where children are involved, and sometimes for alimony.

== Relevant types of unions ==
=== Domestic partnerships ===
Domestic partnerships are a version of civil unions. Registration and recognition are functions of states, localities, or employers; such unions may be available to couples of the same sex and, sometimes, opposite sex. Although similar to marriage, a domestic partnership does not confer the 1,138 rights, privileges, and obligations afforded to married couples by the federal government, but the relevant state government may offer parallel benefits. Because domestic partnerships in the United States are determined by each state or local jurisdictions, or employers, there is no nationwide consistency on the rights, responsibilities, and benefits accorded domestic partners. Some couples enter into a private, informal, documented domestic partnership agreement, specifying their mutual obligations because the obligations are otherwise merely implied, and written contracts are much more valid in legal circumstances.

=== Cohabitation ===
The term is used in a legal setting often to mean, as applied to spouses, living together. Otherwise, cohabitation means two unmarried people, who are in a loving, most often intimate, relationship, living together. Many couples cohabit as a way to experience married life before marriage. Some cohabit instead of marrying. Others may live together because other arrangements are less desired. In the past few decades, societal standards that discouraged cohabitation have faded; it is now considered more acceptable.

Children of cohabiting, instead of married, parents are prone to a more changing family unit. In 2011, The National Marriage Project found about 2/3 of children of cohabitees saw them break up before they were 12 years old, as opposed to 1/4 otherwise.

== See also ==
- Family structure in the United States
- History of courtship in the United States
- Married Women's Property Acts in the United States
- Polygamy in North America
- Marriage certificate § United States
- Single parents in the United States
