= Wolfinger =

Wolfinger is a surname. It may refer to:

- August Wolfinger (born 1949), Liechtenstein alpine skier
- Fabio Wolfinger (born 1996), Liechtenstein footballer
- Franz Wolfinger (1820–1893), Liechtenstein politician
- Joe Wolfinger (born 1985), American basketball player
- Joseph Wolfinger, Sr. (1857–1941), American businessman, inventor and politician
- Nicholas H. Wolfinger, American researcher, academic and educator
- Ray Wolfinger (1931–2015), American political scientist and professor
- Sandro Wolfinger (born 1991), Liechtenstein football player
- Weltin Wolfinger (1926–2010), Liechtenstein bobsledder
