= Marriage gap =

Social phenomenon

The marriage gap describes observed economic and political disparities in the United States between those who are married and those who are single. The marriage gap can be compared to, but should not be confused with, the gender gap. As noted by Dr. W. Bradford Wilcox, American sociologist and director of the National Marriage Project at the University of Virginia, and Wendy Wang, director of research at the Institute for Family Studies, "College-educated and more affluent Americans enjoy relatively strong and stable marriages and the economic and social benefits that flow from such marriages. By contrast, not just poor but also working-class Americans face rising rates of family instability, single parenthood, and lifelong singleness."

== Politics and marriage ==
As part of the marriage gap, unmarried people are "considerably more liberal" than married people. With little variation between professed moderates, married people respond to be conservative 9 percent more, and single people respond to be liberal 10 percent more. Married people tend to hold political opinions that differ from those of people who have never married.

=== Party affiliation in the United States ===
In the U.S., being a married woman is correlated with a higher level of support for the Republican Party, and being single with the Democratic Party. Marriage seems to have a moderate effect on party affiliation among single people. As of 2004, 32 percent of married people called themselves Republicans while 31 percent said they were Democrats. Among single people, 19 percent were Republicans and 38 percent Democrats. The difference is most striking between married and single women. Married women respond as being Republicans 15 percent more; single women respond as being Democrats 11 percent more.

=== Political issues ===
The marriage gap is evident on a range of political issues in the United States:

- same-sex marriage, 11% more married people favor Constitutional amendments disallowing it
- abortion, 14% more married people favor completely banning it
- school vouchers, 3% more married people favor them

== Marriage and cohabitation ==
It is not clear that legally or religiously formalized marriages are associated with better outcomes than long-term cohabitation. Part of the issue is that in many western countries, married couples will have cohabited before marrying so that the stability of the resulting marriage might be attributable to the cohabitation having worked.

A chief executive of an organisation that studies relationships are quoted for having said:

"Because we now have the acceptance of long-term cohabitation, people who go into marriage and stay in marriage are a more homogenous group. They are people who believe in certain things that contribute to stability. So the selection effect is really important. Yes, it's true that married couples on average stay together longer than cohabiting couples. But cohabitation is such an unhelpful word because it covers a whole ragbag of relationships, so it's not really comparable. We're better off talking about formal and informal marriages: those that have legal certificates, and those that don't. Is there any difference between a formal and informal marriage? If we really compare like with like, I'm not sure you'd see much difference." – Penny Mansfield

== Interpreting the data ==
American marriage and family life are divided more today than it ever has been. "Less than half of poor Americans age 18 to 55 ( just 26 percent) and 39 percent of working-class Americans are currently married, compared to more than half (56 percent) of middle- and upper-class Americans." (cite) And when it comes to coupling, poor and working-class Americans are more likely to substitute cohabitation for marriage: poor Americans are almost three times more likely to cohabit (13%), and working-class Americans are twice as likely to cohabit (10%), compared with their middle- and upper-class peers age 18–55 (5%). These findings suggest that lower income and less-educated Americans are more likely to be living outside of a partnership. Specifically, about six in 10 poor Americans are single, about five in 10 working-class Americans are single, and about four in 10 middle- and upper-class Americans are single.

And when it comes to childbearing, working-class and especially poor women are more likely to have children than their middle- and upper-class peers and these children of poor women have a significantly higher chance of being born out of wedlock. Estimates derived from the 2013–15 National Survey of Family Growth indicate that poor women currently have about 2.4 children, compared with 1.8 children for working-class women and 1.7 children for middle- and upper-class women. According to the 2015 American Community Survey, 64 percent of children born to poor women are born out of wedlock, compared with 36 percent of children born to working-class women, and 13 percent of children born to middle- and upper-class children.

With respect to divorce, working-class and poor adults age 18-55 are more likely to divorce than are their middle- and upper-class counterparts. 46 percent of poor Americans aged 18–55 are divorced, compared with 41% of working-class adults and 30 percent of middle- and upper-class adults.

The marriage gap is susceptible to multiple interpretations because it is not clear to what extent it is attributable to causation and what to correlation. It may be that people who already have a number of positive indicators of future wellbeing in terms of wealth and education are more likely to get married. "The distinction between correlation and causation cuts to the heart of the debate about marriage. The evidence is unequivocal; children raised by married couples are healthier, do better at school, commit fewer crimes, go further in education, report higher levels of wellbeing. It is easy for politicians to deduce - and assert - that married couples, therefore, produce superior children. But the children do not necessarily do better because their parents are married and there is actually very little evidence that marriage alone, in the absence of anything else, benefits children." – Penny Mansfield

== Why the marriage divide? ==
As noted by W. Bradford Wilcox and Wendy Wang,

A series of interlocking economic, policy, civic, and cultural changes since the 1960s in America combined to create a perfect family storm for poor and working-class Americans.12 On the economic front, the move to a postindustrial economy in the 1970s made it more difficult for poor and working-class men to find and hold stable, decent-paying jobs.13 See, for example, the increase in unemployment for less-educated but not college-educated men depicted in Figure 9.14 The losses that less-educated men have experienced since the 1970s in job stability and real income have rendered them less "marriageable," that is, less attractive as husbands—and more vulnerable to divorce.

Wilcox and Wang continue, however, and contend that it is not only economics. Citing Cornell sociologist Daniel Lichter and colleagues, they note that "shifts in state-level employment trends and macroeconomic performance do not explain the majority of the decline of marriage in this period; indeed, the retreat from marriage continued in the 1990s even as the economy boomed across much of the country in this decade." In the words of Lichter in colleagues, ""Our results call into question the appropriateness of monocausal economic explanations of declining marriage." In fact, "The decline of marriage and rise of single parenthood in the late 1960s preceded the economic changes that undercut men's wages and job stability in the 1970s."

There exist several possible reasons for the emergence of the Marriage Divide. First, as posited by W. Bradford Wilcox, Wendy Wang, and Nicholas Wolfinger, "because working-class and poor Americans have less of a social and economic stake in stable marriage, they depend more on cultural supports for marriage than do their middle- and upper-class peers."

Second, "Working-class and poor Americans have fewer cultural and educational resources to successfully navigate the increasingly deinstitutionalized character of dating, childbearing, and marriage. The legal scholar Amy Wax argues that the "moral deregulation" of matters related to sex, parenthood, marriage, and divorce proved more difficult for poor and working-class Americans to navigate than for more educated and affluent Americans because the latter group was and remains more likely to approach these matters with a disciplined, long-term perspective." "Today's ethos of freedom and choice when it comes to dating, childbearing, and marriage is more difficult for working-class and poor Americans to navigate."

Third, "in recent years, middle- and upper-class Americans have rejected the most permissive dimensions of the counterculture for themselves and their children, even as poor and working-class Americans have adopted a more permissive orientation toward matters such as divorce and premarital sex. The end result has been that key norms, values, and virtues— from fidelity to attitudes about teen pregnancy—that sustain a strong marriage culture are now generally weaker in poor and working-class communities."

== See also ==
- Achievement gap
- Digital gap
- Generation gap
- Income gap
- Equal opportunity
- Cost of raising a child

== Notes ==
Marriage
