= Cohabitation in the United States =

Cohabitation in the United States is loosely defined as two or more people, in an intimate relationship, who live together and share a common domestic life but are neither joined by marriage nor a civil union.

== Statistics ==
In most parts of the United States, there is no legal registration or definition of cohabitation, so demographers have developed various methods of identifying cohabitation and measuring its prevalence. The Census Bureau currently describes an "unmarried partner" as a "person age 15 years and over, who is not related to the householder, who shares living quarters, and who has a close personal relationship with the householder." Before 1995, the Bureau identified any "unrelated" opposite-sex couple living with no other adults as "POSSLQs", or Persons of Opposite Sex Sharing Living Quarters, and the Bureau still reports these numbers to show historical trends. However, such measures should be taken loosely, as researchers report that cohabitation often does not have clear start and end dates, as people move in and out of each other's homes and sometimes do not agree on the definition of their living arrangement at a particular moment.

In 2001, in the United States 8.2% of couples were calculated to be cohabiting, the majority of them in the West Coast and New England/Northeastern United States areas.

In 2005, the Census Bureau reported 4.85 million cohabiting couples, up more than ten times from 1960, when there were 439,000 such couples. The 2002 National Survey of Family Growth found that more than half of all women aged 15 to 44 have lived with an unmarried partner, and that 65% of American couples who did cohabit got married within 5 years.

In 2011, the Census Bureau reported 7.6 million opposite-sex cohabiting couples in the country with a separate report listing the number of cohabiting same-sex couples at 514,735 as of the 2010 Census.

The cohabiting population includes all age groups, but the average cohabiting age group is between 25 and 34.

== Stability ==
In 2003, a study was made of premarital cohabitation of women who are in a monogamous relationship. The study showed "women who are committed to one relationship, who have both premarital sex and cohabit only with the man they eventually marry, have no higher incidence of divorce than women who abstain from premarital sex and cohabitation. For women in this category, premarital sex and cohabitation with their eventual husband are just two more steps in developing a committed, long-term relationship." Teachman's findings report instead that "It is only women who have more than one intimate premarital relationship who have an elevated risk of marital disruption. This effect is strongest for women who have multiple premarital coresidental unions."

A survey, conducted by researchers at the University of Denver (2009), of over 1,000 married men and women in the United States found those who moved in with a lover before engagement or marriage reported significantly lower quality marriages and a greater possibility for splitting up than other couples. About 20 percent of those who cohabited before getting engaged had since suggested divorce – compared with only 12 percent of those who only moved in together after getting engaged and 10 percent who did not cohabit prior to marriage.

Psychologist Galena Rhoades said: "There might be a subset of people who live together before they got engaged who might have decided to get married really based on other things in their relationship – because they were already living together and less because they really wanted and had decided they wanted a future together. We think some couples who move in together without a clear commitment to marriage may wind up sliding into marriage partly because they are already cohabiting."

A 2001 study of 1,000 adults indicated that people who cohabited experienced a divorce rate 50% higher after marriage than those who did not, though this may be correlation and not cause-and-effect. A subsequent study performed by the National Center for Health Statistics with a sample size of over 12,000 individuals found that there was no significant difference in divorce rate between cohabitating and non-cohabitating individuals.

== Children ==
In 2011, The National Marriage Project reported that about 2/3 of children with cohabiting parents would see them break up before they were 12 years old. About 1/4 of children of married couples would experience this by age 12. Although the chance of divorce increases for longer marriages in general, the divorce rates are not significantly different for those who cohabit before marriage and those who do not. Overall, cohabitation before marriage does not appear to impact the chances of future marriage dissolution negatively.

White American working-class women are more likely than either non-white working-class American women or European women to raise their children with a succession of live-in boyfriends, with the result that the children may live with, and then see the departure of, multiple men. This behavior seems to be driven primarily by the mothers' financial needs.

== Legal status ==
The U.S. states of Mississippi, Michigan, Florida, Arizona, Idaho, Maine, New Mexico, North Carolina, North Dakota, Virginia, and West Virginia are acknowledged to have historically had laws restricting cohabitation for unmarried couples. However, it was acknowledged these laws eventually became unenforced over time. By 2023, Mississippi was the only state to have such a law in the books criminalizing the practice.

IRS regulations (Note: I.R.C. § 152(f)(3)) state that they will not grant exemptions for a cohabiting dependent and relatives if cohabitation is illegal in the local jurisdiction.

=== California ===
Some places, including the state of California, have laws that recognize cohabiting couples as "domestic partners." This recognition led to the creation of a Domestic Partners Registry, granting them limited legal recognition and some rights similar to those of married couples.

=== Florida ===
Although anti-cohabitation laws are often not enforced elsewhere in the country, up through 2016 cohabitants were regularly being charged with misdemeanors in Florida under the state's 1868 law governing "lewd and lascivious behavior". (Note: S. 798.02, F.S.)

On March 22, 2016, the Florida legislature voted to repeal the state's ban on cohabitation. After passing the Senate unanimously, SB 498 passed the House by a vote of 112–5, and governor Rick Scott signed the bill into law on 6 April 2016.

=== North Carolina ===
In North Carolina, cohabitation, defined as "the act of two married or unmarried heterosexual or homosexual adults dwelling together continuously and habitually", is grounds for supporting spouse to terminate a court judgment or order of postseparation support or alimony to a dependent spouse. (Note: NC Code §50-169) Although North Carolina's law against opposite-sex cohabitation (Note: NC Code §14-184) was struck down by North Carolina Superior Court Judge Benjamin Alford, the Supreme Court of North Carolina has never had the chance to rule on the issue, so the law's statewide constitutionality remains unclear.

=== North Dakota ===
North Dakota's anti-cohabitation law dates back to 1895, shortly after the state was admitted to the union. Multiple initial attempts to repeal the law failed—at least three times between 1990 and 2007 alone. On April 1, 2003, the North Dakota state Senate voted 26–21 to keep the 113-year-old state law against male-female cohabitation, which outlawed the practice and carried a penalty of up to 30 days in jail and a $1,000 fine. At the time, North Dakota's most recent census showed 11,000 unmarried couples of all genders. While some married people occasionally asked county authorities to prosecute their spouses for cohabitation or adultery, the law had not been used to prosecute anyone since 1938. Nevertheless, the North Dakota Supreme Court ruled in N.D. Fair Housing Council, Inc. v. Peterson (2001) that "[u]nder the words of the statute, the rules of statutory construction, and the legislative, administrative, and judicial history ... it is not an unlawful discriminatory practice under N.D.C.C. § 14-02.4-12 to refuse to rent to unmarried persons seeking to cohabit."

The law was changed in March 2007; the state House voted 48-41 and the state Senate voted 35–10 in favor of S.B. 2138, which was signed into law by governor John Hoeven, removing the cohabitation statute.

=== Mississippi ===
As of 2023, only one state, Mississippi, still has laws on its books against cohabitation which have not been removed or ruled unconstitutional.

=== Texas ===
Many legal scholars believe that in light of in Lawrence v. Texas (2003), such laws making cohabitation illegal are unconstitutional (North Carolina Superior Court judge Benjamin Alford struck down the North Carolina law as unconstitutional on that basis).

=== Utah ===
The charge of "unlawful cohabitation" was used in the late 19th century to enforce the Edmunds Act, and other federal anti-polygamy laws against the Mormons in the Utah Territory, imprisoning more than 1,300 men. However, incidents of cohabitation by non-polygamists were not charged in that territory at that time. Some modern scholarship suggested the Edmunds Act might be unconstitutional for being in violation of the Free Exercise Clause, although the Supreme Court had repeatedly ruled that neutral laws that happen to impinge on some religious practices are constitutional. On 13 December 2013, US Federal Judge Clark Waddoups ruled in Brown v. Buhman that the portions of Utah's anti-polygamy laws which prohibited multiple cohabitation were unconstitutional, but also allowed Utah to maintain its ban on multiple marriage licenses. This decision was overturned by the United States Court of Appeals for the Tenth Circuit, thus effectively recriminalizing polygamy as a felony. In 2020, Utah voted to downgrade polygamy from a felony to an infraction, but it remains a felony if force, threats or other abuses are involved.

== See also ==
- Family in the United States
- Common-law marriage in the United States
- Divorce in the United States
- Domestic partnership in the United States
- Marriage in the United States
- Society of the United States
- POSSLQ
