= Opportunity gap =

Opportunity gap can refer to:

- in business, a market opportunity that a company or individual is not addressing
- in politics, a euphemism for a lack of equal opportunity

== See also ==
- Business opportunity
- Market intelligence
- Marketing management
- Marketing plan
- Product management
- Strategic planning
- Achievement gap
- Digital gap
- Generation gap
- Income gap
- Marriage gap
