= List of United States Supreme Court cases, volume 125 =

Supreme Court of the United States
- Interactive map of Supreme Court of the United States
- 38°53′26″N 77°00′16″W
- Established: March 4, 1789; 236 years ago
- Location: Washington, D.C.
- Coordinates: 38°53′26″N 77°00′16″W
- Composition method: Presidential nomination with Senate confirmation
- Authorised by: Constitution of the United States, Art. III, § 1
- Judge term length: life tenure, subject to impeachment and removal
- Number of positions: 9 (by statute)
- Website: supremecourt.gov

This is a list of cases reported in volume 125 of United States Reports, decided by the Supreme Court of the United States in 1888.

== Justices of the Supreme Court at the time of volume 125 U.S. ==
The Supreme Court is established by Article III, Section 1 of the Constitution of the United States, which says: "The judicial Power of the United States, shall be vested in one supreme Court . . .". The size of the Court is not specified; the Constitution leaves it to Congress to set the number of justices. Under the Judiciary Act of 1789 Congress originally fixed the number of justices at six (one chief justice and five associate justices). Since 1789 Congress has varied the size of the Court from six to seven, nine, ten, and back to nine justices (always including one chief justice).

When the cases in volume 125 U.S. were decided the Court comprised the following nine members (Chief Justice Waite died in March 1888, and some of his opinions in the cases below were issued posthumously):

Portrait	Justice	Office	Home State	Succeeded	Date confirmed by the Senate (Vote)	Tenure on Supreme Court
	Morrison Waite	Chief Justice	Ohio	Salmon P. Chase	January 21, 1874 (63–0)	March 4, 1874 – March 23, 1888 (Died)
	Samuel Freeman Miller	Associate Justice	Iowa	Peter Vivian Daniel	July 16, 1862 (Acclamation)	July 21, 1862 – October 13, 1890 (Died)
	Stephen Johnson Field	Associate Justice	California	newly created seat	March 10, 1863 (Acclamation)	May 10, 1863 – December 1, 1897 (Retired)
	Joseph P. Bradley	Associate Justice	New Jersey	newly created seat	March 21, 1870 (46–9)	March 23, 1870 – January 22, 1892 (Died)
	John Marshall Harlan	Associate Justice	Kentucky	David Davis	November 29, 1877 (Acclamation)	December 10, 1877 – October 14, 1911 (Died)
	Stanley Matthews	Associate Justice	Ohio	Noah Haynes Swayne	May 12, 1881 (24–23)	May 17, 1881 – March 22, 1889 (Died)
	Horace Gray	Associate Justice	Massachusetts	Nathan Clifford	December 20, 1881 (51–5)	January 9, 1882 – September 15, 1902 (Died)
	Samuel Blatchford	Associate Justice	New York	Ward Hunt	March 22, 1882 (Acclamation)	April 3, 1882 – July 7, 1893 (Died)
	Lucius Quintus Cincinnatus Lamar	Associate Justice	Mississippi	William Burnham Woods	January 16, 1888 (32–28)	January 18, 1888 – January 23, 1893 (Died)

== Citation style ==
Under the Judiciary Act of 1789 the federal court structure at the time comprised District Courts, which had general trial jurisdiction; Circuit Courts, which had mixed trial and appellate (from the US District Courts) jurisdiction; and the United States Supreme Court, which had appellate jurisdiction over the federal District and Circuit courts—and for certain issues over state courts. The Supreme Court also had limited original jurisdiction (i.e., in which cases could be filed directly with the Supreme Court without first having been heard by a lower federal or state court). There were one or more federal District Courts and/or Circuit Courts in each state, territory, or other geographical region.

Bluebook citation style is used for case names, citations, and jurisdictions.

- "C.C.D." = United States Circuit Court for the District of . . .
  - e.g.,"C.C.D.N.J." = United States Circuit Court for the District of New Jersey
- "D." = United States District Court for the District of . . .
  - e.g.,"D. Mass." = United States District Court for the District of Massachusetts
- "E." = Eastern; "M." = Middle; "N." = Northern; "S." = Southern; "W." = Western
  - e.g.,"C.C.S.D.N.Y." = United States Circuit Court for the Southern District of New York
  - e.g.,"M.D. Ala." = United States District Court for the Middle District of Alabama
- "Ct. Cl." = United States Court of Claims
- The abbreviation of a state's name alone indicates the highest appellate court in that state's judiciary at the time.
  - e.g.,"Pa." = Supreme Court of Pennsylvania
  - e.g.,"Me." = Supreme Judicial Court of Maine

== List of cases in volume 125 U.S. ==
Case Name	Page and year	Opinion of the Court	Concurring opinion(s)	Dissenting opinion(s)	Lower court	Disposition
Willamette Iron Bridge Company v. Hatch	1 (1888)	Bradley	none	none	C.C.D. Or.	reversed
New Orleans Waterworks Company v. Louisiana Sugar Refining Company	18 (1888)	Gray	none	none	La.	dismissed
Kreiger v. Shelby Railroad Company	39 (1888)	Gray	none	none	Ky.	dismissed
Dale Tile Manufacturing Company v. Hyatt	46 (1888)	Gray	none	none	N.Y.	affirmed
Felix v. Scharnweber	54 (1888)	Gray	none	none	Ill.	dismissed
National Bank Redemption v. City of Boston	60 (1888)	Matthews	none	none	C.C.D. Mass.	affirmed
Arthur's Executors v. Butterfield	70 (1888)	Field	none	none	C.C.S.D.N.Y.	affirmed
Cunningham v. Norton	77 (1888)	Bradley	none	none	C.C.N.D. Tex.	reversed
Davison v. Davis	90 (1888)	Bradley	none	none	C.C.D. Ky.	affirmed
Weir v. Morden	98 (1888)	Matthews	none	none	C.C.N.D. Ill.	affirmed
Tompkins v. Little Rock and Fort Smith Railroad	109 (1888)	Waite	none	none	C.C.E.D. Ark.	affirmed
Hartranft v. Langfeld	128 (1888)	Matthews	none	none	C.C.E.D. Pa.	affirmed
Tilghman v. Proctor and Gamble	136 (1888)	Gray	none	none	C.C.S.D. Ohio	reversed
City of Chicago v. Taylor	161 (1888)	Harlan	none	none	C.C.N.D. Ill.	affirmed
Cissel v. Dutch	171 (1888)	Blatchford	none	none	Sup. Ct. D.C.	reversed
Potts v. United States	173 (1888)	Waite	none	none	Ct. Cl.	affirmed
United States v. Burchard	176 (1888)	Waite	none	none	Ct. Cl.	reversed
Pembina Consolidated Silver Mining and Milling Company v. Pennsylvania	181 (1888)	Field	none	none	Pa.	affirmed
Maynard v. Hill	190 (1888)	Field	none	none	Sup. Ct. Terr. Wash.	affirmed
Hoskin v. Fisher	217 (1888)	Blatchford	none	none	C.C.N.D. Cal.	reversed
Friedenstein v. United States	224 (1888)	Blatchford	none	Field	C.C.S.D.N.Y.	affirmed
Origet v. United States	240 (1888)	Blatchford	none	none	C.C.S.D.N.Y.	affirmed
Southern Development Company v. Silva	247 (1888)	Lamar	none	none	C.C.N.D. Cal.	affirmed
Hannibal and St. Joseph Railroad Company v. Missouri River Packet Company	260 (1888)	Lamar	none	none	Mo.	affirmed
United States v. San Jacinto Tin Company	273 (1888)	Miller	Field	none	C.C.D. Cal.	affirmed
Clement v. Packer	309 (1888)	Lamar	none	none	C.C.W.D. Pa.	reversed
Hartranft v. Sheppard	337 (1888)	Waite	none	none	C.C.E.D. Pa.	affirmed
Missouri ex rel. Walker v. Walker	339 (1888)	Waite	none	none	Mo.	affirmed
Spencer v. Merchant	345 (1888)	Gray	none	Matthews	N.Y. Sup. Ct.	affirmed
Sage v. Memphis and Little Rock Railroad Company	361 (1888)	Harlan	none	none	C.C.E.D. Ark.	reversed
Wall v. Bissell	382 (1888)	Gray	none	none	C.C.D. Ind.	affirmed
Williams v. Conger	397 (1888)	Bradley	none	none	C.C.N.D. Tex.	affirmed
Washington Ice Company v. Webster	426 (1888)	Blatchford	none	none	C.C.D. Me.	affirmed
Yale Lock Manufacturing Company v. James	447 (1888)	Blatchford	none	none	C.C.S.D.N.Y.	affirmed
Bowman Brothers v. Chicago and Northwestern Railway Company	465 (1888)	Matthews	Field	Harlan	C.C.N.D. Ill.	reversed
Hartranft v. Oliver	525 (1888)	Field	none	none	C.C.E.D. Pa.	affirmed
Western Union Telephone Company v. Attorney General of Massachusetts	530 (1888)	Miller	none	none	C.C.D. Mass.	reversed
Bucher v. Cheshire Railroad Company	555 (1888)	Miller	none	Harlan	C.C.D. Mass.	affirmed
Bowerman Brothers v. Rogers	585 (1888)	Miller	none	none	C.C.S.D.N.Y.	affirmed
Union Trust Company v. Morrison	591 (1888)	Bradley	none	none	C.C.S.D. Ill.	affirmed
Dewolf v. Hays	614 (1888)	Gray	none	none	C.C.D. Cal.	reversed
Doolan v. Carr	618 (1888)	Miller	none	Waite	C.C.D. Cal.	reversed
Johnson v. Christian	642 (1888)	Blatchford	none	none	C.C.E.D. Ark.	reconsideration granted
United States v. Baker	646 (1888)	Blatchford	none	none	Ct. Cl.	affirmed
Nutt v. United States	650 (1888)	Matthews	none	none	Ct. Cl.	affirmed
United States v. Strong	656 (1888)	Matthews	none	none	Ct. Cl.	affirmed
St. Louis, Alton, and Terre Haute Railroad Company v. Cleveland, Columbus, Cincinnati and Indianapolis Railway Company	658 (1888)	Matthews	none	none	C.C.D. Ind.	affirmed
Dow v. Beidelman	680 (1888)	Gray	none	none	Ark.	multiple
Bonahan v. Nebraska	692 (1888)	Waite	none	none	Neb.	case off docket
Addington v. Burke	693 (1888)	Waite	none	none	C.C.N.D. Tex.	dismissed
City of Shreveport v. Holmes	694 (1888)	Waite	none	none	C.C.W.D. La.	rehearing denied
East Tennessee, Virginia and Georgia Railroad Company v. Southern Telegraph Company	695 (1888)	Miller	none	none	C.C.M.D. Ala.	dismissed
In re Royall	696 (1888)	Waite	none	none	Va.	mandate denied
Lyon v. Perin and Gaff Manufacturing Company	698 (1888)	Lamar	none	none	C.C.D. Ind.	affirmed
