= Pennsylvania v. Mimms =

- Supreme Court of the United States

Decided December 5, 1977
- Full case name: Pennsylvania v. Mimms
- Citations: 434 U.S. 106 (more) 98 S. Ct. 330; 54 L. Ed. 2d 331; 1977 U.S. LEXIS 157

Case history
- Prior: 232 Pa. Super. 486, 335 A.2d 516 (Pa. Super. 1975) (confirming conviction); 471 Pa. 546, 370 A.2d 1157 (Pa. 1977) (reversing superior court)

Holding
- Officer ordering defendant out of his car following a traffic stop and conducting a pat-down to check for weapons held didn't violate the Fourth Amendment.

Court membership
- Chief Justice Warren E. Burger Associate Justices William J. Brennan Jr. · Potter Stewart; Byron White · Thurgood Marshall; Harry Blackmun · Lewis F. Powell Jr. William Rehnquist · John P. Stevens

Case opinions
- Per curiam
- Dissent: Marshall
- Dissent: Stevens, joined by Brennan, Marshall

Laws applied
- U.S. Const. amends. IV, XIV

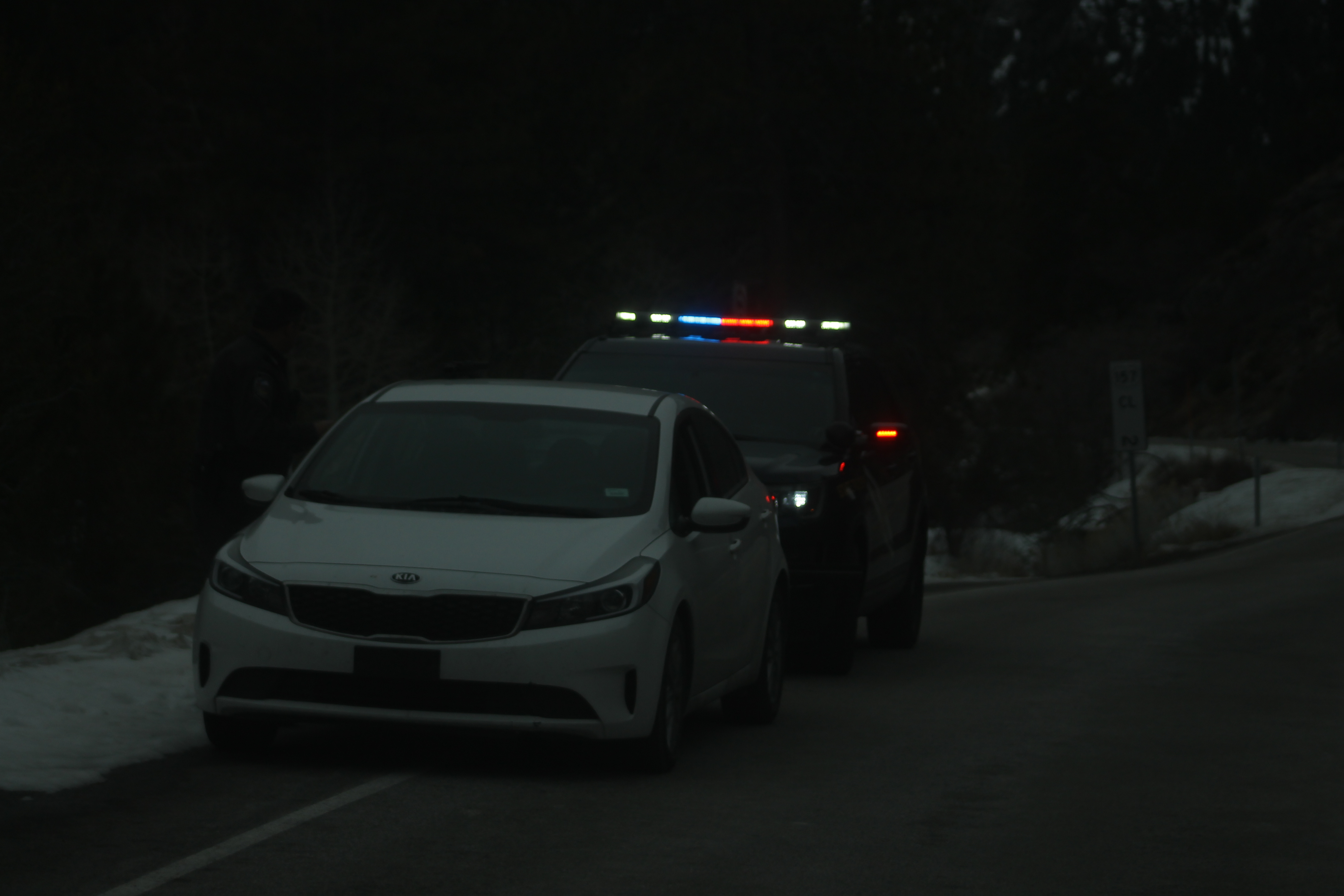
NHP Traffic Stop on Mount Charleston

Pennsylvania v. Mimms, 434 U.S. 106 (1977), is a United States Supreme Court criminal law decision holding that a police officer ordering a person out of a car during a lawful traffic stop did not violate the Fourth Amendment to the United States Constitution. The subsequent observation of a bulge in the person’s jacket was thought to present a danger to the officer, so the officer exercised "reasonable caution" in conducting the pat down, which was also deemed permissible.

== Overview ==
In 1970, two police officers from the Philadelphia Police Department pulled over a vehicle driven by Harry Mimms for an expired license plate. The officers instructed Mimms to exit the vehicle; when Mimms complied, an officer noticed a bulge in his pants under his jacket, conducted a pat-down, and discovered a weapon. The officer arrested Mimms for carrying a concealed deadly weapon and unlawfully carrying a firearm without a license, charges of which Mimms was later convicted. The conviction was reversed by the Pennsylvania Supreme Court (PSC) on March 31, 1975, which ruled that the evidence should have been suppressed because the police had violated Mimms's Fourth Amendment rights against unlawful search and seizure. The United States Supreme Court in turn reversed the PSC's reversal, upholding the original conviction on the grounds that no violation of the Fourth Amendment had occurred.

=== Background ===
The Court in Terry v. Ohio stated, "the facts available to the officer at the moment of the seizure or the search 'warrant a man of reasonable caution in the belief' that the action taken was appropriate." Therefore, the officer had the authority to arrest Mimms under the charges because he had observed the bulge under the jacket.

=== Conclusion ===
The initial ruling favored the police officer in the Court of Common Pleas in Philadelphia. An appeal was brought to the Pennsylvania Supreme Court, which ruled in favor of Mimms; the ruling was reversed once again by the U.S. Supreme Court. In a 6–3 per curiam ruling, the U.S. Supreme Court decided against Mimms, holding that the order to exit the car was reasonable and thus did not violate the Fourth Amendment.

=== Ruling ===
It was considered common for police officers to ask a person inside a vehicle to exit the vehicle so as to prevent any danger that may occur to the officer. It is also much safer to avoid danger from oncoming traffic. Asking Mimms to step out of the car raised little more inconvenience and revealed little more than what had been shown before. Therefore, the bulge that the officer noticed posed a serious threat to the officer. Anyone with this realization may have conducted a "pat down". The decision of the Pennsylvania Supreme Court was reversed.

== Appeal of Pennsylvania ==
The Petitioner of Pennsylvania sought the judgment of the Supreme Court of Pennsylvania to reverse the conviction in favor of Mimms for carrying a firearm and deadly weapon without a license. The court reversed the ruling because the "revolver was seized in a manner which violated the Fourth Amendment to the Constitution of the United States." Because the Supreme Court disagreed with the following ruling, they granted the commonwealth's petition for certiorari, and the judgment of the Supreme Court of Pennsylvania was reversed.

=== Facts before the Supreme Court ===
While on patrol in the city of Philadelphia, two officers discovered Harry Mimms on the road, driving a vehicle with an expired license plate. The two officers pulled the vehicle over to issue a ticket. One of the two officers exited the police car and walked toward Mimms's vehicle, whereupon he asked Mimms to exit the vehicle and show his driver's license and registration. He also asked whether Mimms had a weapon in his vehicle. To assess the situation, the officer frisked and searched Mimms and discovered a loaded .38-caliber handgun. The passenger who was with Mimms was found with a .32-caliber weapon. The officer arrested Mimms on the charge that he was carrying a concealed deadly weapon without a license. The motion to suppress the revolver was denied, and at trial Mimms was convicted on both counts.

The Pennsylvania Supreme Court reversed the lower court, holding that the revolver should have been suppressed because it had been discovered in violation of the Fourth and Fourteenth Amendments. The Pennsylvania Supreme Court saw no problem in the actions that involved pulling the car over and stated that due to observation of a bulge under the respondent's coat, the search was permissible. However, the fact that the officer asked the defendant to exit the vehicle created a forbidden "seizure." Absent Mimms's exiting the vehicle, the officer would have had no grounds for reasonable suspicion, the necessary standard under Terry v. Ohio, 392 U.S. 1 (1968). Because the gun was discovered by the unconstitutional action, it should have been suppressed.

== Opinion ==
=== Majority opinion ===
The Court stated "the objective reasonableness in all the circumstances of the particular governmental invasion of a citizens personal security [...] The reasonableness depends... on a balance between the public interest and the individual's rights to personal security free from arbitrary interference by law officers." Unlike in Terry v. Ohio, the initial "violation" of freedom was permissible because the driver was driving with an expired license plate in violation of the Pennsylvania Department of Transportation Code. The only thing to decide, besides the "pat down," is whether the initial authorization by the officer to tell the respondent to exit the vehicle was allowed under the Fourth Amendment. Therefore, the court must focus on the violation resulting from the officer's telling the respondent to exit the vehicle once the vehicle was legally stopped.

The commonwealth of Pennsylvania maintains that the officer had no evidence to be suspicious of Mimms during the stop, whether it was his behavior or unusual activity; nothing was evident during the patrol. The commonwealth discovered that the officer, during every routine traffic stop, ordered drivers to exit their vehicles. The commonwealth defends the officer, saying that this practice was used to prevent something from happening to the officer and that it could have been reasonable under those circumstances. Being in front of the officer makes it impossible to have something suspicious go unseen if the driver were to attempt something to harm the officer.

There is a risk for officers confronting a driver seated in a vehicle on a routine traffic stop. "According to a study, approximately 21% of police shootings occurred prior to a police officer approaching a suspect seated in an automobile during a traffic stop." However, one cannot assume that traffic violations are more dangerous than other various confrontations.

Another reason for making the action taken by the officer to ask the respondent to exit the vehicle more acceptable was that it could prevent an accidental mishap from oncoming cars. Instead of discussing the issue while standing on the road, the officer may ask a driver to exit the car and move off to the side of the road for further discussion. Now the question at hand is whether there was an intrusion on the personal liberty of the driver after the order to get out of the vehicle. The conclusion was that it was de minimis (low level of risk). The officer has already decided that the driver is to be detained for the traffic summons; now it is whether they should converse while the driver is sitting in the car or standing outside it. The action to step out of the car is merely for the officer's safety and is not a serious infraction of the driver's liberty.

The case of Terry v. Ohio stated that "the facts available to the officer at the moment of the seizure or the search ‘warrant a man of reasonable caution in the belief that the action taken was appropriate." Because the action the officer took in telling the driver to exit the vehicle was justified, the observation of a bulge in the driver’s jacket was thought to present danger to the officer, and therefore the officer had exercised "reasonable caution" in conducting the pat down.

The Supreme Court reversed the ruling by the Supreme Court of Pennsylvania.

=== Dissenting opinions ===
Justice Thurgood Marshall wrote a dissenting opinion, stating that the frisk that the officer proceeded to do to Mimms could be permissible under the Fourth Amendment only if the search was the reason for the stop. The reason Mimms was pulled over had been due to an expired license plate, which in no way involved carrying a concealed weapon.

Justices John Paul Stevens and William Brennan wrote a different dissent, stating that the court gave too much leeway in allowing the officers to search the defendant for any reason of concern.

== See also ==
- Exclusionary rule
- Motor vehicle exception
- Terry stop
- Maryland v. Wilson
