= Babbitt v. Youpee =

- Supreme Court of the United States

Argued December 6, 1996 Decided January 21, 1997
- Full case name: Bruce Babbitt, Secretary of the Interior, et al. v. Marvin K. Youpee, Sr., et al.
- Citations: 519 U.S. 234 (more) 117 S. Ct. 727; 136 L. Ed. 2d 696

Case history
- Prior: Youpee v. Babbitt, 857 F. Supp. 760 (D. Mont. 1994) aff'd, 67 F.3d 194 (9th Cir. 1995)

Holding
- A provision which escheats property to tribe upon owner's death any fractional interest in allotment which constitutes less than two percent of the allotment and has not produced $100 in income over the past five years, unless it is devised or descends to owner of another fractional interest in the allotment, works an unconstitutional taking

Court membership
- Chief Justice William Rehnquist Associate Justices John P. Stevens · Sandra Day O'Connor; Antonin Scalia · Anthony Kennedy; David Souter · Clarence Thomas; Ruth Bader Ginsburg · Stephen Breyer

Case opinions
- Majority: Ginsburg, joined by Rehnquist, O'Connor, Scalia, Kennedy, Souter, Thomas, Breyer
- Dissent: Stevens

Laws applied
- 25 U.S.C. § 2206

Babbitt v. Youpee, 519 U.S. 234 (1997), was a United States Supreme Court case in which the Court held that a provision which escheats property to tribe upon owner's death any fractional interest in allotment which constitutes less than two percent of the allotment and has not produced $100 in income over the past five years, unless it is devised or descends to owner of another fractional interest in the allotment, works an unconstitutional taking.

== Background ==
In the late 1800s, United States Congress initiated a program to allot Indian (Native American) tribal land to individual members of the tribes. Over the ensuing years, the ownership of the land became increasingly fractionalized as the original owners passed their interests onto multiple heirs. About 100 years later, Congress passed the Indian Land Consolidation Act in 1983 to deal with the problem. Section 207 of the act provided that the land would pass, or escheat, to the tribe when the interest was 2 percent or less and earned less than $100 in the preceding year.

The Act did not provide those whose land went to the tribe with any compensation. A previous version of the Act was invalidated under the Fifth Amendment in Hodel v. Irving. While the case was still ongoing, Congress made changes to the statute to try and address the issues identified in Hodel.

William Youpee was an enrolled member of the Sioux and Assiniboine Tribes. His will devised his fractional interests in several parcels of land to several other tribal members. An administrative law judge of the Department of the Interior found that the land should escheat to the tribal government. It was first appealed to the Board of Indian Appeals, which stated it did not have jurisdiction to determine the constitutional claim. The devisees then brought suit seeking relief, which the U.S. District Court granted. The suit claimed that § 207 violated the Just Compensation Clause of the Fifth Amendment. The Ninth Circuit affirmed.

== Supreme Court ==
=== Opinion of the Court ===
Justice Ruth Bader Ginsburg delivered the opinion of the court. Ginsburg noted that Congress had changed the statute, but ended up not addressing any of the constitutional concerns of Hodel. She further noted that while the income from the land might be de minimis, nothing in the statute address the base value of the land itself. Since the statute authorized a taking of property without compensation to the property owner, it violated the Fifth Amendment and was invalid.

=== Dissent ===
Justice John P. Stevens dissented. He believed that Youpee had sufficient notice to prevent the loss of his interest in the property, and that the government had an interest in reducing the problems inherent in fractionalized ownership. He would have held the statute valid.
