= Maryland v. Wilson =

- Supreme Court of the United States

Argued December 11, 1996 Decided February 19, 1997
- Full case name: State of Maryland v. Jerry Lee Wilson
- Citations: 519 U.S. 408 (more)

Holding
- Pennsylvania v. Mimms applies to the passengers of vehicles.

Court membership
- Chief Justice William Rehnquist Associate Justices John P. Stevens · Sandra Day O'Connor; Antonin Scalia · Anthony Kennedy; David Souter · Clarence Thomas; Ruth Bader Ginsburg · Stephen Breyer

Case opinions
- Majority: Rehnquist, joined by O'Connor, Scalia, Thomas, Breyer, Ginsburg, Souter
- Dissent: Stevens, Kennedy

Laws applied
- U.S. Const. Amend. IV

Maryland v. Wilson, 519 U.S. 408 (1997), was a decision by the Supreme Court of the United States. The Court held that officers could order passengers out of a car during a traffic stop, extending Pennsylvania v. Mimms.

== Background ==
Maryland State Trooper David Hughes observed a car speeding at 64 miles per hour in a 55 mile per hour zone. Instead of a license plate, the car had a torn piece of paper from Enterprise Rent-a-Car hanging from the rear. The car did not stop for Hughes' lights and sirens for 1.5 miles.

Hughes observed two passengers turning to look at him, ducking down, and reappearing. As he approached the car, the driver got out and gave him a valid Connecticut driver's license. Hughes noticed Wilson, the front seat passenger, acting nervous and sweating. He then ordered Wilson out of the car while the driver was looking for the car's rental papers. As Wilson got out, a quantity of crack cocaine dropped on the ground. Hughes finally arrested Wilson for cocaine possession.

During Wilson's trial, the Circuit Court of Baltimore County suppressed the crack cocaine as fruit of the poisonous tree. The appellate courts upheld the suppression, ruling that Mimms does not apply to passengers.

== Decision ==
Chief Justice William Rehnquist delivered the majority opinion. The Court ruled that Mimms applies to passengers due to similar public safety concerns. Although it was acknowledged that passengers present less risk in terms of traffic accidents, more people in a vehicle increases risk to the officer in the event of violence. Furthermore, even though there appears to be less probable cause behind ordering a passenger out than a driver, the only major change in circumstances is the person being outside the car.

=== Dissent ===
Justice John P. Stevens wrote a dissent that Justice Kennedy joined. He argued that the majority decision relied on scant evidence and misleading statistics to justify the intrusion of a potentially innocent person's liberty. Additionally, the spirit of Mimms itself rested on the probable cause to detain a driver. Finally, Stevens believes that as long as there is no reasonable suspicion against them, a passenger should be able to decide whether to stay in a vehicle instead of having to risk exposure to bad weather or prying eyes.

Justice Anthony Kennedy complemented Steven's dissent by opining under the American justice system, an officer needs to relay a satisfactory explanation under rational judgement of the circumstances during a seizure (even in situations where officer safety is at risk). He also postulates that a seizure of a passenger during a traffic stop is not a trivial matter as the average traffic stop can take upward of at least half an hour.
