= Robinson v. Shell Oil Co. =

- Supreme Court of the United States

Argued November 6, 1996 Decided February 18, 1997
- Full case name: Charles T. Robinson, Sr. v. Shell Oil Company
- Citations: 519 U.S. 337 (more) 117 S. Ct. 843; 136 L. Ed. 2d 808

Case history
- Prior: 70 F.3d 325 (4th Cir. 1995); cert. granted, 517 U.S. 1154 (1996).

Holding
- Because the term "employees," as used in § 704(a) of Title VII, includes former employees, petitioner may sue respondent for its allegedly retaliatory postemployment actions.

Court membership
- Chief Justice William Rehnquist Associate Justices John P. Stevens · Sandra Day O'Connor; Antonin Scalia · Anthony Kennedy; David Souter · Clarence Thomas; Ruth Bader Ginsburg · Stephen Breyer

Case opinion
- Majority: Thomas, joined by unanimous

Robinson v. Shell Oil Company, 519 U.S. 337 (1997), is US labor law case in the United States Supreme Court in which the Court unanimously held that under federal law, U.S. employers must not engage in workplace discrimination such as writing bad job references, or otherwise retaliating against former employees as a punishment for filing job discrimination complaints.

== Facts ==
The case involved a former Shell employee, Charles T. Robinson, who claimed Shell Oil Company fired him from his sales job because he is black. While his race discrimination lawsuit was pending, Robinson applied for a job with another company who contacted Shell seeking a reference. Shell gave Robinson an unfavourable rating and said it would not rehire him. The Equal Employment Opportunity Commission submitted a "friend of the court" brief, saying that if former employees were not protected, they "would be chilled from taking action to report or oppose discrimination." Under §704(a) of Title VII of the Civil Rights Act of 1964 it is unlawful "for an employer to discriminate against any of his employees or applicants for employment" who have availed themselves of Title VII's protections. The company claimed that because Robinson was now a former employee, because they fired him, he was no longer protected.

== Judgment ==
The Court agreed with the view expressed by the EEOC. Justice Thomas wrote for the court, "EEOC quite persuasively maintains that it would be destructive to [the purposes of anti-bias law] for an employer to be able to retaliate with impunity."

Finding that the term "employees" in § 704(a) is ambiguous, we are left to resolve that ambiguity. The broader context provided by other sections of the statute provides considerable assistance in this regard. As noted above, several sections of the statute plainly contemplate that former employees will make use of the remedial mechanisms of Title VII. See supra, at 342-343. Indeed, § 703(a) expressly includes discriminatory "discharge" as one of the unlawful employment practices against which Title VII is directed. 42 U. S. C. § 2000e-2(a). Insofar as § 704(a) expressly protects employees from retaliation for filing a "charge" under Title VII, and a charge under § 703(a) alleging unlawful discharge would necessarily be brought by a former employee, it is far more consistent to include former employees within the scope of "employees" protected by § 704(a). In further support of this view, petitioner argues that the word "employees" includes former employees because to hold otherwise would effectively vitiate much of the protection afforded by § 704(a).

== Significance ==
Robinson eventually lost his original race discrimination case against Shell Oil Company.

== See also ==
- List of United States Supreme Court cases
- Lists of United States Supreme Court cases by volume
- List of United States Supreme Court cases by the Rehnquist Court
- United States labor law
