= POSSLQ =

United States census term for person of opposite sex sharing living quarters

POSSLQ (/ˌpɒsəlˈkjuː/ POSS-əl-KEW, plural POSSLQs) is an abbreviation (or acronym) for "person of opposite sex sharing living quarters", a term coined in the late 1970s by the United States Census Bureau as part of an effort to more accurately gauge the prevalence of cohabitation in American households.

After the 1980 Census, the term gained currency in the wider culture for a time.

After demographers observed the increasing frequency of cohabitation over the 1980s, the Census Bureau began directly asking respondents to their major surveys whether they were "unmarried partners", thus making obsolete the old method of counting cohabitors, which involved a series of assumptions about "persons of opposite sex sharing living quarters". The category "unmarried partner" first appeared in the 1990 Census, and was incorporated into the monthly Current Population Survey starting in 1995. By the late 1990s, the term POSSLQ had fallen out of general usage (having been replaced by "significant other") and returned to being a specialized term for demographers.

== In popular culture ==
CBS commentator Charles Osgood composed a verse which includes

There's nothing that I wouldn't do
If you would be my POSSLQ
You live with me and I with you,
And you will be my POSSLQ.
I'll be your friend and so much more;
That's what a POSSLQ is for.

== See also ==
- Cohabitation in the United States
- Common-law marriage
- Family (U.S. census)
- Significant other
