= Old Chief v. United States =

- Supreme Court of the United States

Argued October 16, 1996 Decided January 7, 1997
- Full case name: Johnny Lynn Old Chief v. United States of America
- Citations: 519 U.S. 172 (more) 117 S. Ct. 644; 136 L. Ed. 2d 574; 1997 U.S. LEXIS 298

Case history
- Prior: Conviction affirmed by the Ninth Circuit, 56 F.3d 75 (9th Cir. 1995), cert. granted, 516 U.S. 1110 (1996).

Holding
- Where the prior conviction is an element of the crime charged, evidence of a defendant's prior conviction may not be admitted if the defendant is willing to concede to the fact of the conviction.

Court membership
- Chief Justice William Rehnquist Associate Justices John P. Stevens · Sandra Day O'Connor; Antonin Scalia · Anthony Kennedy; David Souter · Clarence Thomas; Ruth Bader Ginsburg · Stephen Breyer

Case opinions
- Majority: Souter, joined by Stevens, Kennedy, Ginsburg, Breyer
- Dissent: O'Connor, joined by Rehnquist, Scalia, Thomas

Laws applied
- Fed. R. Evid. 403

Old Chief v. United States, 519 U.S. 172 (1997), discussed the limitation on admitting relevant evidence set forth in Federal Rule of Evidence 403. Under this rule, otherwise relevant evidence may be excluded if the probative value of the evidence is substantially outweighed by the danger of unfair prejudice, confusion of the issues, misleading the jury, or considerations of undue delay, wasting time, or needless presentation of cumulative evidence. In this case, Old Chief offered to stipulate to the fact of a prior conviction, which was an element of the crime with which he was charged. The prosecution resisted this stipulation, arguing that it had the right to present its case in any manner it chose. In Old Chief, the Court applied Rule 403 to the particular situation presented by this case, and concluded that Rule 403 required the trial court to accept the defendant's stipulation to a prior conviction over the prosecution's objection. The holding in Old Chief, however, was narrowly tailored to the facts of the case (and the criminal statute at issue) and therefore provided little guidance in other cases.

== Facts ==
Johnny Lynn Old Chief was arrested after a "fracas" involving "at least one gunshot." He was eventually charged with assault with a dangerous weapon, using a firearm in relation to a crime of violence, and being a felon in possession of a firearm. At trial, he asked the court to order the prosecution to refrain from mentioning any fact surrounding the prior felony that made him a prohibited possessor of a firearm. He also offered to stipulate to the fact that he had suffered a prior conviction that made him a prohibited possessor. The reason for asking the prosecution not to mention the facts of the prior crime, he said, was to preserve his right to be convicted by a jury beyond a reasonable doubt on the basis of the facts relating to only the conduct with which he was currently charged. In light of the stipulation, he contended that introducing any evidence relating to the facts of his prior crimes would be unfairly prejudicial under Rule 403 of the Federal Rules of Evidence. The prosecutor refused to agree to Old Chief's stipulation, arguing that he had the right to prove his case his own way. The district court sided with the prosecutor, resulting in the admission of evidence at trial that Old Chief had previously been convicted of "knowingly and unlawfully assault[ing] Rory Dean Fenner, said assault resulting in serious bodily injury." Old Chief was convicted on all the federal counts against him.

The Ninth Circuit affirmed the conviction. Under its case law at the time, the prosecution had the right to prove its case through probative evidence, and a "stipulation is not proof, and, thus, it has no place in the FRE 403 balancing process." In light of this circuit precedent, the Ninth Circuit held that the trial court did not abuse its discretion in admitting the facts of Old Chief's prior conviction against him at his trial. The U.S. Supreme Court then agreed to hear the case.

== Majority opinion ==
The Court quickly disposed of Old Chief's first argument, which was that Rule 401 required the district court to exclude the name of the crime of which he had been convicted. Rule 401 defines "relevant" evidence as evidence that makes a fact of consequence more or less probable than without it. Because the fact of a prior felony conviction was an element of the crime of being a felon in possession of a firearm, the Court reasoned that the record of Old Chief's prior conviction was relevant under Rule 401. Hence, if "relevant evidence is inadmissible in the presence of other evidence related to it, its exclusion must rest not on the ground that the other evidence has rendered it "irrelevant," but on its character as unfairly prejudicial, cumulative or the like, its relevance notwithstanding."

Rule 403 allows the exclusion of relevant evidence on the grounds of "unfair prejudice." Unfair prejudice to a criminal defendant means the danger that the jury will "generaliz[e] a defendant's earlier bad act into bad character and taking that as raising the odds that he did the later bad act now charged (or worse, as calling for preventive conviction even if he should happen to be innocent momentarily)." Rule 404(b) addresses this danger directly, to be sure; however, prior convictions also present a danger of unfair prejudice and are thus subject to the Rule 403 balancing test.

Because Rule 403 contemplates a balancing test, the Court then had to describe how to conduct that balancing. Two possibilities arose for doing so. First, "an item of evidence might be viewed as an island," such that its probative value and danger for unfair prejudice would be assessed in a vacuum. Second, the item of evidence in question could be measured in relation to "the full evidentiary context of the case as the court understands it when the ruling must be made." Under the first approach, the party offering the evidence would have an incentive to organize its case around the most unfairly prejudicial evidence it can find that is highly probative, and leave out equally probative evidence that is less prejudicial. Thus, even if the trial court were to exclude the proffering party's preferred evidence, that party would still have equally probative evidence to fall back on. Thus, the Court reasoned that an assessment of prejudice must be conducted with reference to all the other actually available evidence in the hands of the proffering party.

As a general rule, the prosecution is generally entitled to prove its case in the manner it sees fit. Jurors come to court expecting that evidence will be presented to them in narrative fashion, and there is a possibility that jurors may punish a party that does not meet this expectation. Even if jurors do not expressly punish the prosecution for the sin of making its case with stipulations, they may still be confused by a story that moves in fits and starts, with essential gaps filled in by stipulations instead of succinct storytelling. Yet, as far as the element of a prior conviction is concerned, a defendant's stipulation is just as conclusive as the underlying facts of the crime. The prosecution's need to prove its case via storytelling has no force when it comes to the fact of a prior conviction. In order to find this element of the felon-in-possession crime satisfied, all the jury needs to know is that the defendant has been convicted of a crime that qualifies him as a prohibited possessor, and this can just as easily be accomplished by stipulation as by narrative storytelling. Therefore, although the prosecution ordinarily may insist on proving its case via narrative evidence, Rule 403 allows the defendant to stipulate to prior convictions in order to avoid the unfair prejudice that would result from the prosecution introducing the facts of that prior crime into evidence during the later prosecution.

== Dissenting opinion ==
Justice O'Connor contested the majority opinion, which held that introducing the facts of a defendant's prior conviction could be unfairly prejudicial. After all, Congress had made the fact of a prior conviction an element of the crime of being a felon in possession of a firearm. It therefore intended for a jury trying such a case to hear the facts of the defendant's prior crime. If the jury was not intended to hear the facts of a defendant's prior crime, certainly there was minimal risk that the jury would convict the defendant for an "improper" reason.

== See also ==
- List of United States Supreme Court cases, volume 519
- List of United States Supreme Court cases
- Lists of United States Supreme Court cases by volume
