= Nicholas H. Wolfinger =

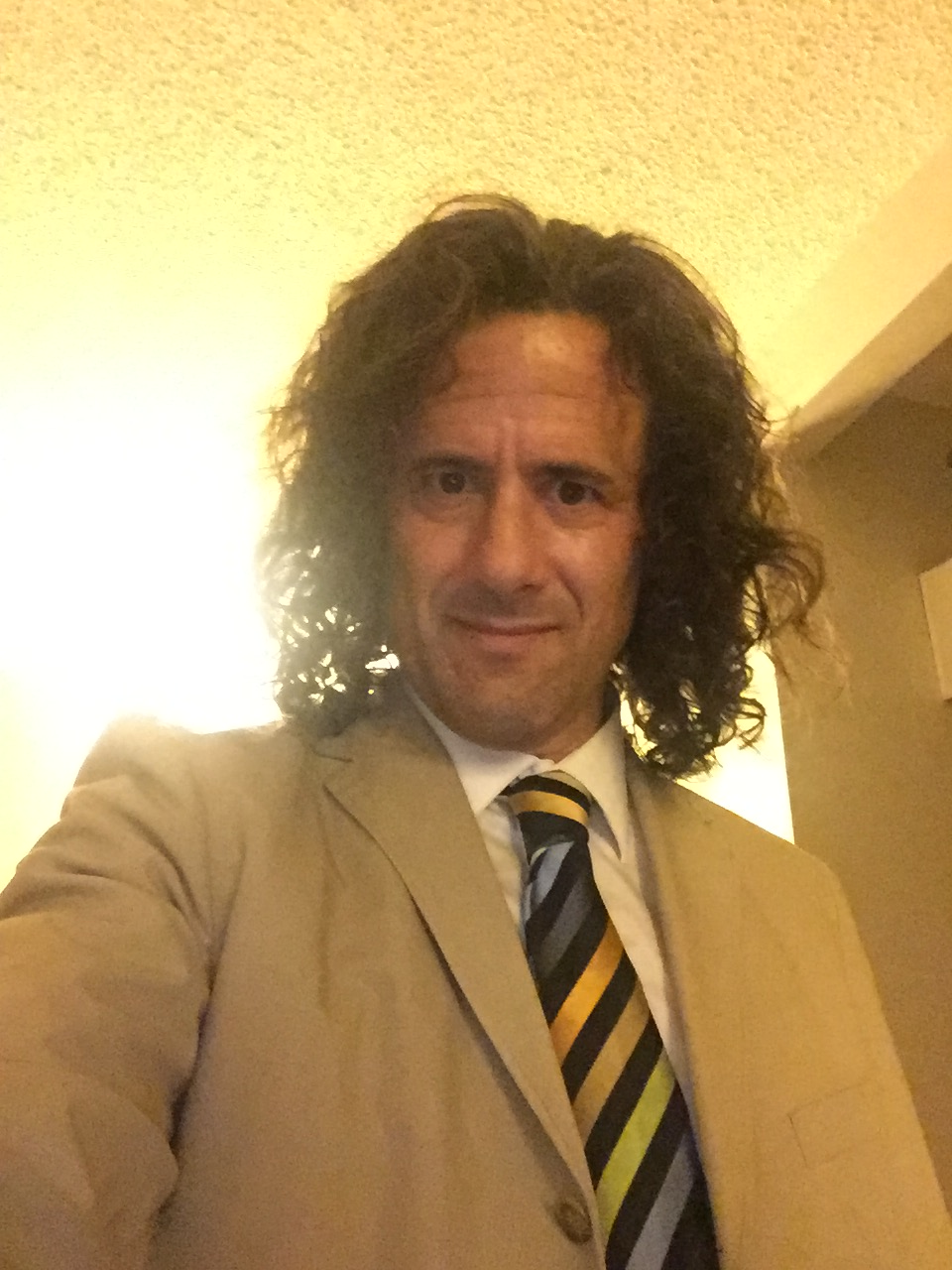
- Occupations: Researcher, academic and educator
- Parent: Ray Wolfinger

Academic background
- Education: University of California, Berkeley (BA); University of California, Los Angeles (MA, PhD)

Academic work
- Institutions: University of Utah
- Website: nicholaswolfinger.com

Nicholas H. Wolfinger is an American researcher, academic and educator. He is professor in the Department of Family and Consumer Studies and adjunct professor of sociology at the University of Utah. His research is focused on sociology of the family, religion, social demography and quantitative and qualitative methods.

Nicholas H. Wolfinger is the son of Ray Wolfinger.

== Education and career ==
Wolfinger received a B.A. in sociology from University of California, Berkeley in 1990 and an M.A. in sociology from University of California, Los Angeles in 1992. In 1998, he received a PhD. in sociology from University of California, Los Angeles.

Wolfinger joined the Department of Family and Consumer Studies at the University of Utah in 1998 as an assistant professor, later becoming associate professor and then full professor.

Wolfinger's work has been covered in the New York Times, The Washington Post, USA Today, The Wall Street Journal, and The Los Angeles Times.

=== Publications ===
Wolfinger is the author or editor of five books, Understanding the Divorce Cycle: The Children of Divorce in Their Own Marriages (2005), Fragile Families and the Marriage Agenda (2005), Do Babies Matter? Gender and Family in the Ivory Tower (2013), Soul Mates: Religion, Sex, Children, and Marriage among African Americans and Latinos (2016), and Professors Speak Out: The Truth About Campus Investigations (2025).

Wolfinger is the author of over 40 scholarly articles and book chapters.

== Research ==
Wolfinger's research interests include marriage and divorce, poverty, religion, and higher education. Much of his research is based on the analysis of data from large national surveys. He has also conducted qualitative research based on interviews and surveys and has published methodological work on both quantitative and qualitative research methods.

=== Divorce ===
Wolfinger's early research examined how divorce runs in families. He found that the rate of divorce transmission between generations, the propensity to divorce as the result of growing up in a divorced family, diminished greatly between 1973 and 1996. His work in this area showed that as the divorce rate increased, its rate of transmission declined. Wolfinger's research on the intergenerational transmission of divorce was published in the monograph Understanding Divorce Cycle: The Children of Divorce in Their Own Marriages.

Wolfinger has also conducted research on how divorce affects offspring marriage timing. His research indicated that parental divorce increases the chances of teenage marriage, but past age twenty makes marriage about a third less likely.

=== Higher education and marriage ===
Wolfinger worked on The Do Babies Matter project with Mary Ann Mason and Marc Goulden. The project explored how marriage and children differentially affect men and women's academic careers. National panel data from the Survey of Doctorate Recipients showed that family formation completely explains women's fortunes on the academic job market; indeed, single women without young children are more likely than men to obtain tenure-track employment. Marriage and children had smaller effects elsewhere in the academic life cycle.

=== Religion ===
In collaboration with W. Bradford Wilcox, Wolfinger explored the relationship between marriage, relationship quality, and religious participation. They found that attendance at religious services has broad salutary effects on relationships. In 2016, Wolfinger and Wilcox published a book on their research, Soul Mates: Religion, Sex, Children, and Marriage among African Americans and Latinos (Oxford University Press). It drew on six national data sets, in-depth interviews with 85 clergy and parishioners, and a year of ethnographic fieldwork.

=== Economics of single motherhood ===
In collaboration with Matthew McKeever, Wolfinger has studied trends in the economics of single motherhood. They have analyzed data from the National Longitudinal Survey of Youth and the Current Population Survey to show how demographic shifts and changing job skills have affected single mothers’ incomes. Their research emphasizes the contrast between divorcées and women who give birth out of wedlock.

== Books ==
- Fragile Families and the Marriage Agenda (2005)
- Understanding the Divorce Cycle: The Children of Divorce in Their Own Marriages (2005)
- Do Babies Matter? Gender and Family in the Ivory Tower (2013)
- Soul Mates: Religion, Sex, Love and Marriage among African Americans and Latinos (2016)
- Thanks for Nothing: The Economics of Single Motherhood since 1980 (2024)
- Professors Speak Out: The Truth About Campus Investigations (2025)
