= Ray Wolfinger =

American political scientist (1931–2015)

Raymond Edwin Wolfinger (29 June 1931 – 6 February 2015) was an American political scientist and professor at the University of California at Berkeley. He was best known as the co-author (with Steven J. Rosenstone) of an influential book on voter turnout, Who Votes. Prior to his tenure at Berkeley, he was on the faculty at Stanford University. In between this academic career he was an assistant to Sen. Hubert H. Humphrey, for whom he helped manage passage of the 1964 Civil Rights Act. Wolfinger was the source of the well-known aphorism, "The plural of anecdote is data." He was a behavioral political scientist, an empiricist in search of better data and rigorous thinking and testing, and a protégé of Robert Dahl. He was the father of sociologist Nicholas H. Wolfinger.

Wolfinger received his Ph.D. in political science from Yale University, his M.A. from the University of Illinois, and his B.A. from the University of California, Berkeley.
