= List of United States Supreme Court cases, volume 519 =

This is a list of all the United States Supreme Court cases from volume 519 of the United States Reports:

Case name	Citation	Date decided
Department of State v. Legal Assistance for Vietnamese Asylum Seekers, Inc.	519 U.S. 1	1996
California v. Roy	519 U.S. 2	November 4, 1996
Lopez v. Monterey County	519 U.S. 9	1996
INS v. Yueh-Shaio Yang	519 U.S. 26	1996
In deciding whether to grant a waiver under § 1251(a)(I)(H), the Attorney General (or her delegate, the INS) may take into account acts of fraud committed by the non-citizen in connection with their entry into the United States.
Ohio v. Robinette	519 U.S. 33	1996
United States v. Jose	519 U.S. 54	1996
In re Gaydos	519 U.S. 59	1996
Caterpillar Inc. v. Lewis	519 U.S. 61	1996
O'Gilvie v. United States	519 U.S. 79	1996
M.L.B. v. S.L.J.	519 U.S. 102	1996
Greene v. Georgia	519 U.S. 145	1996
United States v. Watts	519 U.S. 148	January 6, 1997
Old Chief v. United States	519 U.S. 172	1997
Walters v. Metropolitan Ed. Enterprises, Inc.	519 U.S. 202	1997
The ultimate touchstone under Title VII's § 2000e(b) is whether an employer has employment relationships with 15 or more individuals for each working day in 20 or more weeks during the year in question.
Atherton v. FDIC	519 U.S. 213	1997
Grimmett v. Brown	519 U.S. 233	1997
Dismissed as improvidently granted.
Babbitt v. Youpee	519 U.S. 234	1997
Ingalls Shipbuilding, Inc. v. Director, Office of Workers' Compensation Programs	519 U.S. 248	1997
General Motors Corp. v. Tracy	519 U.S. 278	1997
California Div. of Labor Standards Enforcement v. Dillingham Constr., N. A., Inc.	519 U.S. 316	1997
Robinson v. Shell Oil Co.	519 U.S. 337	1997
United States v. Brockamp	519 U.S. 347	1997
Bibles v. Oregon Natural Desert Assn.	519 U.S. 355	1997
Schenck v. Pro-Choice Network of Western N. Y.	519 U.S. 357	1997
Maryland v. Wilson	519 U.S. 408	1997
Regents of Univ. of Cal. v. Doe	519 U.S. 425	1997
Lynce v. Mathis	519 U.S. 433	1997
Auer v. Robbins	519 U.S. 452	1997
Dunn v. Commodity Futures Trading Comm'n	519 U.S. 465	1997
Options are "transactions in foreign currency" within the meaning of the CEA's Treasury Amendment.
United States v. Wells	519 U.S. 482	1997
