= M.L.B. v. S.L.J. =

- Supreme Court of the United States

Argued October 7, 1996 Decided December 16, 1996
- Full case name: M. L. B., petitioner v. S. L. J., individually and as next friend of the minor children, S. L. J. and M. L. J., et ux.
- Citations: 519 U.S. 102 (more) 117 S. Ct. 555; 136 L. Ed. 2d 473; 1996 U.S. LEXIS 7647; 65 U.S.L.W. 4035; 96 Cal. Daily Op. Service 9032; 96 Daily Journal DAR 14946; 10 Fla. L. Weekly Fed. S 221

Case history
- Prior: Griffin v. Illinois, 351 U.S. 12; Mayer v. Chicago, 404 U.S. 189

Holding
- Just as a state may not block an indigent petty offender's access to an appeal afforded to others, Mississippi may not deny M.L.B., because of her poverty, appellate review of the sufficiency of the evidence on which the trial court based its parental termination decree.

Court membership
- Chief Justice William Rehnquist Associate Justices John P. Stevens · Sandra Day O'Connor; Antonin Scalia · Anthony Kennedy; David Souter · Clarence Thomas; Ruth Bader Ginsburg · Stephen Breyer

Case opinions
- Majority: Ginsburg, joined by Stevens, O'Connor, Souter, Breyer
- Concurrence: Kennedy
- Dissent: Rehnquist
- Dissent: Thomas, joined by Scalia; Rehnquist (except part II)

Laws applied
- U.S. Const. amend. XIV

M.L.B. v. S.L.J., 519 U.S. 102 (1996), was a Supreme Court of the United States case regarding a controversy over the Fourteenth Amendment. The petitioner, M.L.B., argued that the Mississippi Chancery Courts could not terminate her parental rights on the basis that she was unable to pay the court fees. M.L.B. had been sued by S.L.J. to terminate M.L.B.'s parental rights and gain the ability to adopt the children. The judge declared in favor of S.L.J. under the premise that the decree was fair, as it was based on the fulfilling of the burden of proof by the father and his second wife with "clear and convincing evidence."

Despite the statement, the Chancery Court never elaborated on the evidence or clearly explained why M.L.B.'s parental rights had been dismissed. When M.L.B. went to appeal, she was unable to pay for the record preparation fees of $2,352.36 and so was denied. She then went to appeal under in forma pauperis but was again denied on the grounds that in forma pauperis is not demanded in civil cases, only criminal cases.

The case was then brought to the Supreme Court, where M.L.B. held that an inability to pay court fees should not be decisive of something as precious as parental rights. She used the guidelines set out in the due process and equal protection clauses of the Fourteenth Amendment to fight her case.

The Supreme Court decided in the petitioner's favor and stated that in matters regarding parental rights, a court may not stop a party from appealing the case based on financial means.

Because this ruling extended in forma pauperis to civil cases, there was a question of how liberally it could be applied. It was then clarified that in forma pauperis may be applied to civil cases only if state controls or intrusions on family relationships are involved. The Supreme Court decided that the family unit is considered so fundamental that its liberty interests should be protected by the Fourteenth Amendment. The protection of appellate rights was considered to be just as important as that of criminal rights.

== Context ==
On November 15, 1993, respondent S.L.J., the biological father of the children, sued petitioner M.L.B., the biological mother, in a Mississippi Chancery Court for adoptive rights of the petitioner's natural children. After a three-day trial, the court decided in favor of S.L.J.. M.L.B. filed for an appeal where she intended to argue that the Chancery Court's decision was unsupported by the evidence or lack thereof. The fees the Court charged her for the record preparations was too high for the petitioner to pay and, determined to keep her parental rights, she asked for in forma pauperis. When she went to the Mississippi Supreme Court, M.L.B.'s motions were denied, but on April 1, 1996, the US Supreme Court] agreed to hear the petitioner's case through writ of certiorari. M.L.B. went into the case, ready to back her stance through the Fourteenth Amendment. In section 1 of the Fourteenth Amendment, it is stated, "No state shall... deprive any person of life, liberty, or property, without due process of law; nor deny to any person within its jurisdiction the equal protection of the laws."

When making its decision, the Supreme Court also took into account many cases that were related to issues with the Fourteenth Amendment. It looked at Griffin v. Illinois, which i decided that if an appeal was granted, the indigent defendants must be granted the same level of appellate review as defendants who could afford every record or transcript. It also considered Mayer v. Chicago in which a destitute criminal's right to appeal was upheld again. The case came while the need for such changes in the law was growing.

The court also took into account cases in which the family was involved. Lassiter v. Department of Social Services of Durham Cty, 452 U.S. 18, which stated that indigent defendants in a parental termination case are not required by the Constitution to be provided with counsel, but they should be determined by the circumstances. In the 1990s, the divorce rate was almost 50%.

In 1993, the year of the original case, the poverty rate was at 15.1%, with 39.3 million people living under the official poverty level. Although the window this case opened for in forma pauperis in civil cases was narrow, it was also highly necessary.

=== Issue ===
When M.L.B. was unable to appeal because of her financial difficulties, she felt that at least in forma pauperis should apply. It did not apply to parenthood, which was not a criminal case. The conflict then arose of whether or not the Fourteenth Amendment of the Constitution allowed a state to condition appeals made by indigent persons if a court decreed a termination of parental rights.

The court was reluctant to extend in forma pauperis to any civil case for fear that it would open the door for too many minor civil cases. When making its decision, the Supreme Court looked at the situation and considered family a fundamental right of a citizen.

== Opinion ==
=== Majority ===
A 6-3 opinion decided that "just as a state may not block an indigent petty offender's access to an appeal afforded others, so Mississippi may not deny M.L.B., because of her poverty, appellate review of the sufficiency of the evidence on which the trial court found her unfit to remain a parent." The court stated that due process could not be halted by a lack of funds in a case if the termination of parental rights was at risk. Ginsburg wrote the majority opinion and was joined by O'Connor, Souter, Breyer, and Stevens. The concurrence was written by Kennedy.

A case that contributed to the court's opinion was Griffin v. Illinois, 351 U.S. 12 (1956). Before that case, only convicted felons sentenced to death had access to an appellate review if they were unable to pay for transcripts. The court then decided that all criminal cases, even noncapital ones, would be allowed the same right, in accordance with the Fourteenth Amendment. The other largely-influential case was Mayer v. Chicago, 404 U.S. 189 (1971), which decided that any offence, even "quasi-criminal" ones in nature, may be appealed, regardless of financial means. M.L.B. argued that what was at stake for her was far greater than what was at stake for a "quasi-criminal" and that her right to appeal should in no way be determined by her wallet. The court made their ruling based on that argument and reversed the one made by the Mississippi Supreme Court.

=== Concurring opinion ===
The concurrence was written by Kennedy. He reiterated the impact that both Griffin v. Illinois and Mayer v. Chicago had on the case. Also, the court must reverse the previous ruling because of the importance of the rights inherent in any family matters. Appellate review is not always necessary, but if it is granted, the court must not bar litigants from fulfilling their appeal by a lack of funds in cases as grave as this one. On family matters, cases like Boddie v. Connecticut and Lassiter v. Department of Social Services of Durham City were cited as grounds for the decision.

=== Dissenting opinion ===
The dissenting opinion was written by Thomas and joined by Rehnquist and Scalia. In it, they contend that if they allow for free transcripts in a civil appeal in this one case, it will be applied too liberally to other civil cases. There is also issue over M.L.B.'s claims that she should be protected under Due Process and Equal Protection Clauses, as there is no clear explanation how they apply. Also, the Due Process Clause does not state that a state is even obliged to provide for an appeal. Furthermore, the petitioner has gone through an entire court process that was provided for her, ensuring her due process. The state's duty to M.L.B. has thus been fulfilled. M.L.B.'s motives, as well, are questioned, as the petitioner may care less about due process and more about delaying the sting of termination of her parental rights. The majority cited irrelevant Supreme Court that apply to criminal, not civil, cases.

== Aftermath ==
The ruling opened the doors for the destitute to fight for their parental rights. During the 1990s, poverty levels hit remarkable lows, but divorce rates remained high.
