= Maynard v. Hill =

- Supreme Court of the United States

Decided March 19, 1888
- Full case name: Maynard v. Hill
- Citations: 125 U.S. 190 (more)

Holding
- Marriage is a status entered into by contract, and the parties have no power to alter the status of "marriage" under law. Thus, a legislative divorce is valid, and courts have no jurisdiction to review them.

Court membership
- Chief Justice Morrison Waite Associate Justices Samuel F. Miller · Stephen J. Field; Joseph P. Bradley · John M. Harlan; Stanley Matthews · Horace Gray; Samuel Blatchford · Lucius Q. C. Lamar II

Case opinions
- Majority: Field
- Dissent: Matthews, Gray
- Bradley took no part in the consideration or decision of the case.

Maynard v. Hill, 125 U.S. 190 (1888), was a United States Supreme Court case in which the court held that marriage is a status entered into by contract, and the parties have no power to alter the status of "marriage" under law with that contract. Thus, a legislative divorce is valid, and courts have no jurisdiction to review them.

== Background ==
=== The broken promise ===
In 1828, David S. Maynard and Lydia A. Maynard married in Vermont and lived there together as husband and wife until 1850, when they moved to Ohio. Also in 1850, the husband moved to Oregon Territory. When the husband left his wife and their children in Ohio, he promised that he would return or send for them within two years and that he would send them support. He never sent support to them.

On the April 3, 1852, the husband settled upon and claimed, as a married man, a tract of land of 640 acres in land that would eventually become Washington State. The territorial land system heavily incentivized married people to come to the territory and settle by giving them more land than single people would receive. Under that scheme, half of this land would belong to the husband, and the other half would belong to the wife.

However, also in 1852, the husband applied for a legislative divorce without notice to or the knowledge of his wife. The territorial legislature did pass the statute dissolving the marriage on December 22. On January 15, 1853, the husband married a woman named Catherine T. Brashears, and thereafter they lived together until he died intestate in 1873. His first wife died in the year 1879. The legislative divorce backfired severely against his land claim and, consequently, his children from his first marriage.

=== The dissolution of the wives' land claim ===
On April 30, 1856, the husband had represented to the territorial land office that he had resided upon and cultivated his claim for four years from April 3, 1852, to and including April 3, 1856. Those officers issued to him and his second wife a certificate for the land claim, apportioning the west half to him and the east half to her. This certificate was annulled by the Commissioner of the General Land Office because the husband was claiming that his first wife was dead. If that was so, her heirs were entitled to half of the claim.

On a subsequent hearing, the first wife appeared, and the territorial officials awarded the east half of the claim to her and the west half to the husband. From this decision an appeal was taken to the Commissioner of the General Land Office. The Commissioner affirmed the decision of the register and receiver so far as it awarded the west half to the husband but reversed the decision so far as it awarded the east half to the first wife. The Commissioner held that neither wife was entitled to that half. He accordingly directed the certificate as to the east half to be cancelled.

On a further appeal, the United States Secretary of the Interior affirmed the decision of the Commissioner, holding that the husband had fully complied with all the requirements of the law relating to settlement and cultivation as a single man, and was therefore entitled to the west half awarded to him. However, the Secretary also held that at the time of the alleged divorce, the husband possessed only an inchoate interest in the lands, and whether it should ever become a vested interest depended upon his future compliance with the conditions prescribed by the statute. Accordingly, his first wife possessed no vested interest in the property. He also held that the second wife was not entitled to any portion of the claim, because she was not his wife on the first day of December 1850, or within one year from that date, which was necessary to entitle her to one-half of the claim under the statute. Subsequently, the east half of the claim was treated as public land, and was surveyed and platted as such under the direction of the Commissioner of the General Land Office.

=== The children's lawsuit for title to the land claim ===
The primary defendants in the case that eventually went to the Supreme Court were Hill and Lewis. They received from the Territory a claim for the Porterfield land scrip, which was within the territory originally apportioned for the first wife. The other defendant in the case, Flagg, may have also had some sort of claim on property there.

The plaintiffs were Henry C. Maynard and Frances J. Patterson, the children of the first marriage. They claimed to have equitable title to the lands. They insisted that the decision of the Commissioner and Secretary was erroneous and founded upon a misapprehension of the law. The only issue in the case was whether the first marriage remained valid despite the legislative divorce. They argued that the legislature did not constitutionally have the power to interfere with the contract that established the marriage under the Contract Clause.

== Opinion of the court ==
The Supreme Court issued an opinion on March 19, 1888. The fact that the husband was a resident of the Territory gave the legislature jurisdiction over the marriage. The validity of the act is not affected by the fact that it was passed upon his application, without notice to his wife, or by his promises to his wife.

Justices Matthews and Gray dissented without separate opinion, and Justice Bradley took no part in the case.

== Later developments ==
Maynard is a federal case, and the situation in particular states may be different. For example, a moral panic in the late 1800s prompted the drafters of the Washington State Constitution to prohibit the Washington State Legislature from granting any legislative divorce. Therefore, a court in Washington has jurisdiction to review a legislative divorce like the one in this case and hold it invalid.
