= United States v. Strong =

2013 United States court case

- Court: United States Court of Appeals for the First Circuit
- Decided: July 19, 2013
- Citation: 724 F.3d 51 (1st Cir. 2013).

Case history
- Appealed from: United States District Court for the District of Maine

Court membership
- Judges sitting: Sandra Lynch, Juan R. Torruella, & William J. Kayatta Jr.

Case opinions
- Decision by: Sandra Lynch
- Concurrence: William J. Kayatta Jr.
- Dissent: Juan R. Torruella

Keywords
- Constructive notice; De novo review

In United States v. Ronald J. Strong, 724 F.3d 51 (1st Cir. 2013), the U.S. Court of Appeals for the First Circuit had to consider if the violation of federal regulations occurring on a federal property could still stand if such regulations had not met posting requirements.

== Background ==
Hallway of the courthouse

At around 11:30 a.m. on May 24, 2011, Ronald Strong entered the Edward T. Gignoux Courthouse in Portland, Maine. As he was going through security Strong informed the court security officer that he needed to use the bathroom, was told he had to pass through security, soiled himself, and was escorted to the restroom, in that order; about ten minutes later, he headed to the clerk's office.

Approximately fifteen minutes after Strong's departure, a law enforcement officer approached the restroom to use it, found it severely soiled, and summoned a cleaner, who later recalled that "seventy-five percent of the floor was covered in feces", that more had been "smeared more than two feet up on the walls", and that even more could be found "on the paper towel and toilet paper dispensers, on the toilet paper itself, and on part of the toilet seat and the left side of the toilet bowl". For this, on May 27, 2011, Strong was charged with three misdemeanors, willfully damaging federal property, creating a hazard on federal property, and creating a nuisance on federal property.

At trial Strong argued that the court was out of compliance with posting regulations which was a requirement to charge him. Additionally Strong argued the government had failed to show his intent at the time. He was sentenced to seven days in jail.

== Opinion of the court ==
The First Circuit affirmed the decision of the lower court. In the review of the statute requiring the posting of the regulations, Judge Lynch highlighted that the statute stated that the posting of regulations had to be located "in a conspicuous place on the property". While regulations of the General Services Administration required notice to be posted at the front of the courthouse, the court found that imperfect compliance did not invalidate Strong's conviction. On the matter of intent, the lower court noted that "The defendant may very well have accidentally put some on the floor or on the walls as he tried to clean up, but it was smeared over 75 percent of the floor, on two walls at several different locations, and that indicates to me that in fact, it was a willful act". Judge Torruella dissented, claiming that the smears on the walls were not "finger smears" but chunks similar to chunky peanut butter.

Strong filed an appeal to the United States Supreme Court but was denied.

== Legal analysis ==
The case in question raised numerous concerns about constructive notice and how it is applied on federal property. For example, in the 1983 case United States v. Strakoff, the Fifth Circuit court of appeals handled a similar legal question on the matter of someone receiving notice of federal laws and rules on federal property. In the Strakoff case the defendant was convicted of bringing a firearm into a federal courthouse in violation of government regulation. Similar to the Strong case, the regulations were not posted at the entrance to the building but were posted in other places within the building. Unlike in Strong, the court overturned the conviction in Strakoff as the regulations were not considered adequately posted.
