= W. Bradford Wilcox =

American sociologist and demographer

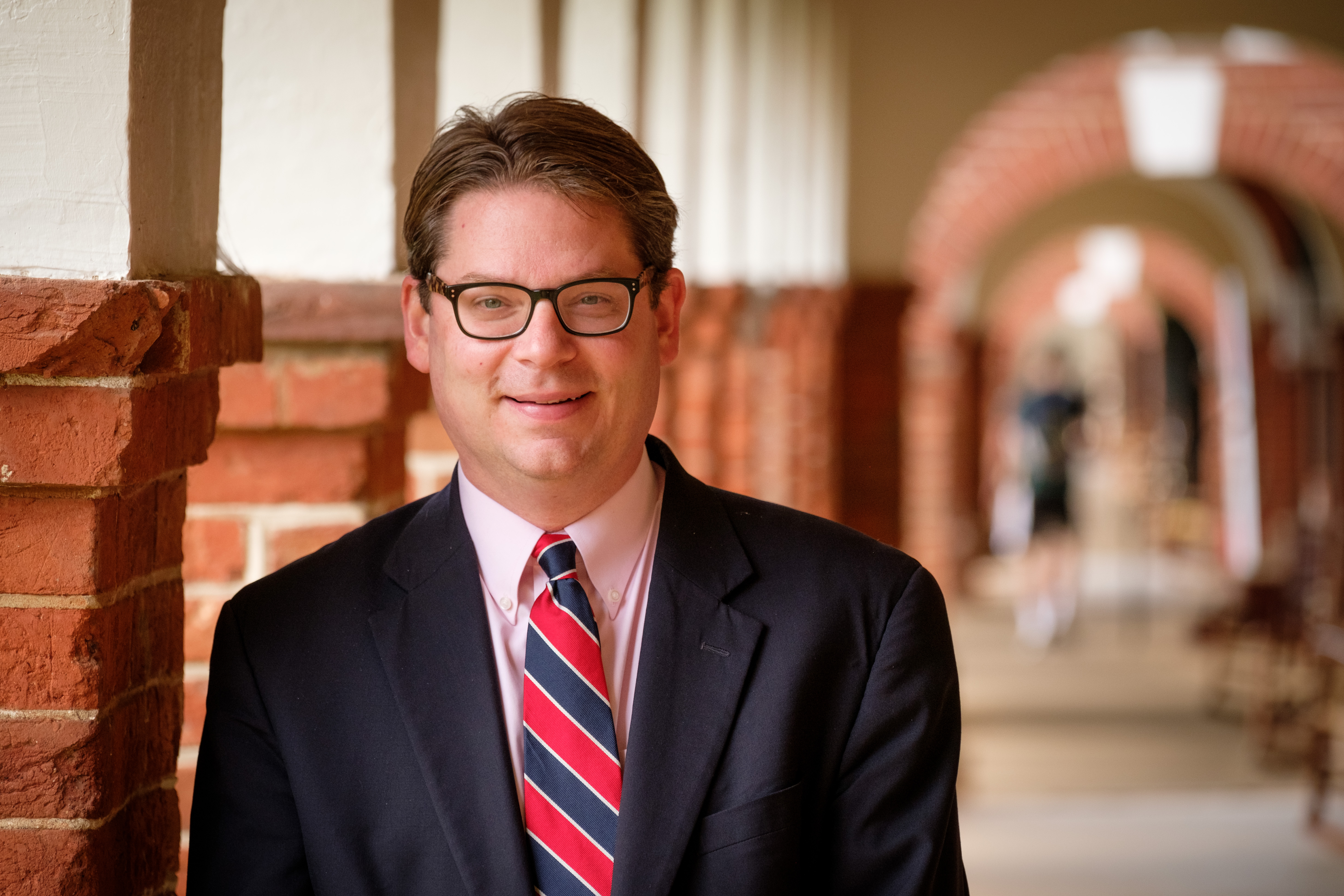
- Wilcox in 2017
- Born: William Bradford Wilcox; August 21, 1970 (age 56)
- Other name: Brad Wilcox

Academic background
- Education: University of Virginia (BA); Princeton University (MA, PhD)
- Doctoral advisor: Robert Wuthnow

Academic work
- Discipline: Sociology
- Institutions: University of Virginia; Princeton University; Yale University; Brookings Institution
- Website: sociology.as.virginia.edu/people/profile/wbw7q

William Bradford Wilcox (born 1970) is an American sociologist. He serves as director of the National Marriage Project and professor of sociology at the University of Virginia, senior fellow at the Institute for Family Studies, and a visiting scholar at the American Enterprise Institute. He is author of Get Married: Why Americans Must Defy the Elites, Forge Strong Families, and Save Civilization (HarperCollins. 2024)

== Early life and education ==
Wilcox was born on August 21, 1970. As an undergraduate, Wilcox was a Jefferson Scholar at the University of Virginia. He graduated with a bachelor's degree with high honors in 1992. He earned an MA with distinction in 1997, and a PhD in 2001, both from Princeton University. He held research fellowships at Princeton University, Yale University, and the Brookings Institution before joining the faculty of the University of Virginia, where he is a Professor of Sociology and director of graduate studies. His sociological research centers on marriage, fatherhood, and cohabitation, particularly on how family structure, civil society, and culture affect the quality and stability of family life, and the ways families shape the economic outcomes of individuals and societies. He teaches undergraduate- and graduate-level courses on statistics, family, and religion.

== Work ==
Wilcox has authored and edited several books, and published numerous articles on marriage, fatherhood, parenting, and religion. His work has appeared in the American Sociological Review, Social Forces, and The Journal of Marriage and Family.

He has published articles in more popular venues as well, such as The Wall Street Journal, The New York Times, The Washington Post, National Review, and The Weekly Standard. As director of the National Marriage Project, Wilcox also oversees the publication of an annual report on marriage in America, entitled The State of Our Unions.

Wilcox is the author of Get Married: Why Americans Must Defy the Elites, Forge Strong Families, and Save Civilization, published on February 13, 2024, by HarperCollins. New York Times columnist David Brooks called the book "vitally important." "As a culture, we could improve our national happiness levels by making sure people focus most on what is primary — marriage and intimate relationships — and not on what is important but secondary — their career," Brooks writes. But another writer in the Times wrote that Wilcox—along with Brooks and others who urge more marriages—"fails to engage with the reality on the ground that heterosexual women from many walks of life confront: the state of men today ... A more granular look at what the reality of dating looks and feels like for straight women can go a long way toward explaining why marriage rates are lower than policy scholars would prefer."

Wilcox has been a strong proponent of the success sequence, arguing that data show that people who graduate high school, get a full-time job, and have children after marriage are consequently less likely to be poor. Critics argue that scholars like Wilcox pay too little attention to social structures that stymie individual efforts to escape poverty. The data supporting the success sequence reflect selection effects rather than causation, in their view: it demonstrates that advantaged young adults are more likely to graduate, get a job, and have children in wedlock—but it does not necessarily prove that people who graduate, get a job, and have children in wedlock will become successful.

In 2013, Wilcox was revealed, along with Billy Dunne, as two of the three anonymous peer reviewers of a controversial study by Mark Regnerus, "How Different Are the Adult Children of Parents Who Have Same-Sex Relationships? Findings from the New Family Structures Study". Wilcox was the director of the Program on Family, Marriage and Democracy at the Witherspoon Institute, which funded Regnerus's study. The study was much criticized for its methodology and for allegations that it was shaped by funds from politically conservative organizations.

== Writing and testimony ==
Wilcox's research on marriage, religion, and family life has been featured in the Los Angeles Times, The New York Times, The Wall Street Journal, The Washington Post, USA Today, Slate, The Huffington Post, National Review Online, National Journal, National Public Radio, CBS Evening News with Katie Couric, NBC's The Today Show, and numerous other media outlets. His work is also regularly cited in academic publications.

In May 2014, Wilcox and several other experts spoke at a meeting convened by the United Nations as part of the 20th Anniversary of the International Year of the Family. His topic was "The Family in Transition: Should We Be Concerned About Declines in Fertility and Marriage?"

In February 2015, Wilcox testified before the House Ways and Means Committee's Subcommittee on Human Resources about the challenges low-income families face in today's economy.

Wilcox contributed a piece to The Atlantic in June 2023 that describes the growing political polarization of the sexes and what it means for the future of marriage. In August 2023, Wilcox wrote a piece for UnHerd based on research from the University of Chicago finding a 30-percentage-point happiness divide between married and unmarried Americans. In November 2021, Wilcox contributed a piece to the Wall Street Journal describing how Glenn Youngkin's victory in the Virginia gubernatorial race edged the Republican Party further toward becoming "the parents' party."

== Bibliography ==
- Soft Patriarchs and New Men: How Christianity Shapes Fathers and Husbands, The University of Chicago Press, 2004
- Gender and Parenthood: Biological and Social Scientific Perspectives, Columbia University Press, 2013
- Whither the Child? Causes and Consequences of Low Fertility ed. with Eric Kaufmann, Boulder, CO: Paradigm, 2013.
- Soul Mates: Religion, Sex, Love, & Marriage among African Americans and Latinos, Oxford University Press, 2016
- Unequal Family Lives: Causes and Consequences in Europe and the Americas ed. with Naomi Cahn, June Carbone, and Laurie DeRose, Cambridge University Press, 2018
