= The National Marriage Project =

American research project

The National Marriage Project is a research project based in the U.S. that investigates how American marriages are formed, maintained and ended, and how society is affected. The project gathers statistical information and analyzes it to provide education to the public, and to formulate recommendations for the future. The project was started in 1997 by David Popenoe, a sociologist at Rutgers University. Since 2009 it has been based at the University of Virginia under the direction of sociologist W. Bradford Wilcox.
