= Carter v. United States =

Carter v. United States could refer to:

- Carter v. United States, 530 U.S. 255 (2000).
- Carter v. United States, (No. 24-860).
