= Skinner v. Railway Labor Executives' Ass'n =

Skinner v. Railway Labor Executives Association
- Supreme Court of the United States

Argued November 2, 1988 Decided March 21, 1989
- Full case name: Samuel K. Skinner, Secretary of Transportation, et al. v. Railway Labor Executives' Association, et al.
- Citations: 489 U.S. 602 (more) 109 S. Ct. 1402; 103 L. Ed. 2d 639

Case history
- Prior: Railway Labor Executives Ass'n v. Burnley, 839 F.2d 575 (9th Cir. 1988)

Holding
- The Fourth Amendment is applicable to the drug and alcohol testing mandated or authorized by the FRA regulations.

Court membership
- Chief Justice William Rehnquist Associate Justices William J. Brennan Jr. · Byron White; Thurgood Marshall · Harry Blackmun; John P. Stevens · Sandra Day O'Connor; Antonin Scalia · Anthony Kennedy

Case opinions
- Majority: Kennedy, joined by Rehnquist, White, Blackmun, O'Connor, Scalia
- Concurrence: Stevens
- Dissent: Marshall, joined by Brennan

Skinner v. Railway Labor Executives Association, 489 U.S. 602 (1989), was the U.S. Supreme Court case that paved the way for random drug testing of public employees in "safety sensitive" positions.

== Background ==
In the mid-1980s, the Federal Railroad Administration (FRA) issued regulations to adopt safety standards for the railroad industry. Included in these regulations were mandatory blood and urine tests of employees involved in train accidents, to determine if they were using illegal narcotics. The FRA also adopted regulations that authorized railroads to administer breath and urine drug tests to employees who violated safety rules. The Railway Labor Executives' Association, an umbrella group of railway trade unions, sued to have the regulations declared an unconstitutional violation of the Fourth Amendment to the United States Constitution.

== Decision ==
At face value, random drug testing appears to be a violation of the Fourth Amendment, which protects the right of citizens "to be secure in their persons, houses, papers, and effects, against unreasonable searches and seizures." In addition, the Fourth Amendment states that "no Warrants shall issue, but upon probable cause, supported by Oath or affirmation, and particularly describing the place to be searched, and the persons or things to be seized." However, the United States Supreme Court ruled in Skinner that random drug testing is permissible for employees in safety sensitive positions. Justice Kennedy, speaking for the majority, wrote:

[T]he Government interest in testing without a showing of individualized suspicion is compelling. Employees subject to the tests discharge duties fraught with such risks of injury to others that even a momentary lapse of attention can have disastrous consequences based on the interest of the general public […] While no procedure can identify all impaired employees with ease and perfect accuracy, the FRA regulations supply an effective means of deterring employees engaged in safety-sensitive tasks from using controlled substances or alcohol in the first place.

The dissenting opinion by Justices Marshall and Brennan illustrates the other side of the controversy:

The issue in this case is not whether declaring a war on illegal drugs is good public policy. The importance of ridding our society of such drugs is, by now, apparent to all. Rather, the issue here is whether the Government's deployment in that war of a particularly Draconian weapon—the compulsory collection and chemical testing of railroad workers' blood and urine—comports with the Fourth Amendment. Precisely because the need for action against the drug scourge is manifest, the need for vigilance against unconstitutional excess is great. History teaches that grave threats to liberty often come in times of urgency, when constitutional rights seem too extravagant to endure. The World War II relocation-camp cases, Hirabayashi v. United States, 320 U.S. 81 (1943); Korematsu v. United States, 323 U.S. 214 (1944), and the Red scare and McCarthy-era internal subversion cases, Schenck v. United States, 249 U.S. 47 (1919); Dennis v. United States, 341 U.S. 494 (1951), are only the most extreme reminders that when we allow fundamental freedoms to be sacrificed in the name of real or perceived exigency, we invariably come to regret it.

== Special Needs Doctrine ==
The United States Foreign Intelligence Surveillance Court (FISA court) has used this ruling to expand the "special needs doctrine" that carves out an exception to the Fourth Amendment for the broad collection and examination of Americans' data to track possible terrorists.

== See also ==
- List of United States Supreme Court cases, volume 489
- List of United States Supreme Court cases
- Lists of United States Supreme Court cases by volume
- List of United States Supreme Court cases by the Rehnquist Court
- National Treasury Employees Union v. Von Raab (1989)
- Railway Labor Executives' Association v. Gibbons (1982)
