= Railway Labor Executives' Association v. Gibbons =

Railway Labor Executives' Ass'n v. Gibbons
- Supreme Court of the United States

Argued December 2, 1981 Decided March 2, 1982
- Full case name: Railway Labor Executives' Association v. William M. Gibbons, Trustee, et al.
- Citations: 455 U.S. 457 (more) 102 S. Ct. 1169; 71 L. Ed. 2d 335

Holding
- Congress may not ignore the language 'uniform' in the Bankruptcy Clause by dictating how to distribute the liquid assets of a specific bankrupt company.

Court membership
- Chief Justice Warren E. Burger Associate Justices William J. Brennan Jr. · Byron White; Thurgood Marshall · Harry Blackmun; Lewis F. Powell Jr. · William Rehnquist; John P. Stevens · Sandra Day O'Connor

Case opinions
- Majority: Rehnquist, joined by Burger, White, Blackmun, Powell, Stevens, O'Conner
- Concurrence: Marshall, joined by Brennan

Railway Labor Executives' Association v. Gibbons, 455 U.S. 457 (1982), was a U.S. Supreme Court case that affirmed distinction between the Commerce Clause and Bankruptcy Clause of the Enumerated powers, and held that legislation passed by Congress regarding bankruptcy must respect the uniformity requirement by not targeting a specific company.

== Background ==
In March 1975, the Chicago, Rock Island and Pacific Railroad Co. (Rock Island) petitioned for reorganization with the Interstate Commerce Commission (ICC). The reorganization allowed the company to survive for over four years, but a labor strike in September 1979 forced it to cease all operations. The ICC ordered the Kansas City Terminal Railway Co. to provide service over Rock Island's railways.

On January 25, 1980, the reorganization court concluded that reorganization was not possible and directed the Trustee of the organization to begin preparing for liquidation of the company. The liquidation was scheduled to happen in March 1980, immediately concluding the ICC's contract with the Kansas City railway company.

Congress responded to this crisis by passing 45 U.S.C. ch. 19, the Rock Island Railroad Transition and Employee Assistance Act (RITA), which would have instructed the ICC to liquidate assets and then prioritize compensating labor who lost their jobs because of the bankruptcy, but had not found new employment through liquidation contracts. The amount that Congress believe owed to these employees amounted to $75 million. It was signed into law by President Ronald Reagan on May 30, 1980, three days before the reorganization court's order to abandon the Rock Island railways was to become active.

On June 5, appellees filed a complaint with the reorganization court declaring RITA unconstitutional. The reorganization court issued a preliminary injunction prohibiting its enforcement. The court suggested that RITA violated the Just Compensation Clause of the Fifth Amendment.

Congress again responded to this injunction by invoking Section 701 of the Staggers Rail Act, which re-enacted RITA and added 45 U.S.C. § 1018, which stated "any decision of the bankruptcy court with respect to the constitutionality of any provision of this chapter ... shall be taken to the United States Court of Appeals for the Seventh Circuit". The bill was passed on October 14, 1980.

The United States had motioned the reorganization court six days prior to vacate its previous injunction, as the Staggers Act would render it moot. The day after the Staggers Act was passed, the reorganization court denied the motion to vacate. Pursuant to the newly enacted law, appellant and the United States appealed to the Court of Appeals for the Seventh Circuit. The Court of Appeals affirmed the reorganization court's decision with an even split. Appellant then petitioned the Supreme Court.

== Decision ==
The Supreme Court was unanimous in its decision that RITA, as amended by the Staggers Act, was "repugnant" to the Bankruptcy Clause which required bankruptcy laws to apply "uniformly".

The majority's opinion elaborated that the court first had to determine if Congress was invoking the Bankruptcy Clause or the Commerce Clause. The majority opinion was delivered by Justice Rehnquist, who claimed determining what power Congress was exercising was "admittedly not an easy task". However, they decided it was inappropriately using the powers of the Bankruptcy Clause, evidenced by the timing of the legislation and that sections explicitly directed the bankruptcy court on how to prioritize distribution of funds.

In sum, RITA imposes upon a bankrupt railroad the duty to pay large sums of money to its displaced employees, and then establishes a mechanism through which these "obligations" are to be satisfied. The Act provides that the claims of these employees are to be accorded priority over the claims of Rock Island's commercial creditors, bondholders, and shareholders. It follows that the subject matter of RITA is the relationship between a bankrupt railroad and its creditors. See Wright v. Union Central Life Ins. Co., supra, at 513-514. The Act goes as far as to alter the relationship among the claimants to the Rock Island estate's remaining assets. In enacting RITA, Congress did nothing less than to prescribe the manner in which the property of the Rock Island estate is to be distributed among its creditors.

Although the original decision was made because of the Just Compensation Clause of the Fifth Amendment, the Supreme Court did not reach on this, as the issue with the Bankruptcy Clause was sufficient to declare RITA unconstitutional.

== See also ==
- Skinner v. Railway Labor Executives Ass'n (1989)
- List of United States Supreme Court cases, volume 455
- List of United States Supreme Court cases
- Lists of United States Supreme Court cases by volume
- List of United States Supreme Court cases by the Rehnquist Court
