= NTEU =

NTEU may refer to:

- National Tertiary Education Union, a trade union representing Australian university employees
- National Treasury Employees Union, a trade union representing employees of the U.S. federal government

== See also ==
- Nei til EU, a Norwegian eurosceptic organisation
