= Federal Employers Liability Act =

1908 U.S. law that protects and compensates railroaders injured on the job

Federal Employers' Liability Act
- Other short titles: Employers' Liability Act of 1908
- Long title: An Act relating to the liability of common carriers by railroad to their employees in certain cases.
- Acronyms (colloquial): FELA
- Enacted by: the 60th United States Congress
- Effective: April 22, 1908

Citations
- Public law: Pub. L. 60-100
- Statutes at Large: 35 Stat. 65

Codification
- Titles amended: 45 U.S.C.: Railroads
- U.S.C. sections created: 45 U.S.C. §§ 51–60

Legislative history
- Signed into law by President Theodore Roosevelt on April 22, 1908

United States Supreme Court cases
- Second Employers' Liability Cases, 223 U.S. 1 (1912); Rogers v. Missouri Pacific Railroad Co., 352 U.S. 500 (1957); CSX Transportation, Inc. v. McBride, 564 U.S. 685 (2011)

The Federal Employers' Liability Act (FELA), 45 U.S.C. § 51 et seq. (1908), is a United States federal law that protects and compensates railroaders injured on the job.

== Background ==
In the years between 1889 and 1920, railroad use in the U.S. expanded six-fold. With this expansion, the dangers to the railroad worker increased.

President Benjamin Harrison addressed these dangers in a speech to the United States Congress in 1889, in which he compared the plight of the railroad worker to those of a soldier at war:

It is a reproach to our civilization that any class of American workmen, should in the pursuit of a necessary and useful vocation, be subjected to a peril of life and limb as great as that of a soldier in time of war.

In discussing the need for legislation to address the railroad worker's exposure to harm, U.S. Representative Henry D. Flood, a strong advocate for the passage of the FELA, referred to alarming statistics about the injuries and deaths associated with work on the railroad.

To curb these dangers, Congress relied upon the experience of certain states which had already passed legislation similar to the FELA to support the proposition that the FELA would lead to increased safety on the railroad. Flood urged the U.S. House of Representatives to "follow the lead of those enlightened and progressive states."

== The Act ==
=== Adoption ===
The FELA Act enacted in 1906 was declared unconstitutional by the U.S. Supreme Court. The 1908 legislation passed by Congress, however, withstood tests.

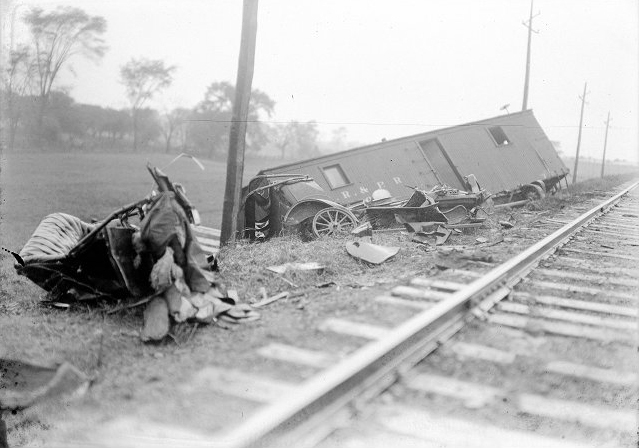
Fatal car accident in Spencerport, New York, October 20, 1917

Congress passed FELA in response to the high number of railroad deaths in the late 19th century and early 20th century. Under FELA, railroad workers who are not covered by regular workers' compensation laws are able to sue companies over their injury claims. FELA allows monetary payouts for pain and suffering, decided by juries based on comparative negligence rather than pursuant to a pre-determined benefits schedule under workers' compensation.

FELA was not intended to be awarded automatically. Unlike State Workers' Compensation Law, FELA requires the injured railroader to prove that the railroad was negligent, at least in part, in causing the injury. After proving negligence, the injured railroader is entitled to full compensation. Such compensation is usually more individualized and equitable than that provided by State Worker's Compensation for non-railroaders.

=== Attempts to revise ===
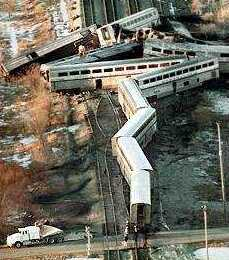
Amtrak accident at Bourbonnais, Illinois, March 15, 1999

In the 44 years following the enactment of the FELA, 26 bills were introduced to replace the FELA with workers' compensation. Congress refused in each instance to make this change. .

=== Solvent lawsuits ===
Tens of millions of dollars have been paid by railroad companies to settle solvent lawsuits under FELA. Current or former railroad workers have claimed exposure to toxic solvents from the 1960s into the 1990s has caused mild to severe brain damage. CSX, the largest railroad in the eastern United States, has acknowledged settling 466 solvent exposure claims and paying up to $35 million, though the company has continued to deny a link between solvent exposure and brain damage. Medical experts estimate that thousands of workers may be suffering from toxic encephalopathy, but have been misdiagnosed due to the complexity of diagnosing the debilitating illness.

=== Law Review articles ===
The Federal Employers Liability Act was designed to put on the railroad industry some of the costs of the legs, arms, eyes, and lives which it consumed in its operation. Not all these costs were imposed, for the Act did not make the employer an insurer. The liability which it imposed was the liability for negligence.

— Justice William Douglas, United States Supreme Court
- "MTA, it's not "going your way" – liability of the metropolitan transportation authority under FELA: Greene v. Long Island R.R, St. John's L. Rev., Winter 2001.
- "The Standard of Sufficiency of Evidence to Create a Jury Question in FELA Cases is Peculiar to That Type of Case, and a Reasonable Man Standard Is Applicable in Non-FELA Jury Trials," Boeing v. Shipman, 411 F.2d 365 (5th Cir. 1969), 48 Texas L. Rev. 695 (1970).

== See also ==
- Brotherhood of Locomotive Engineers and Trainmen
- Brotherhood of Maintenance of Way Employes
- Brotherhood of Railroad Signalmen
- Federal Railroad Administration
- Railroad Retirement Board
