= Project Prevention =

American non-profit organization

- Founded: 1997
- Founder: Barbara Harris
- Purpose: Charity
- Key people: Barbara Harris
- Website: projectprevention.org

Project Prevention (formerly Children Requiring a Caring Kommunity or CRACK) is an American non-profit organization that pays drug addicts cash for volunteering for long-term birth control, including sterilization. Originally based in California and now based in North Carolina, the organization began operating in the United Kingdom in 2010. The organization offers US$300 (£200 in the UK) to each participant. Barbara Harris founded the organization in 1997 after she and her husband adopted the fifth, sixth, seventh, and eighth child of a drug-addicted mother. As of July 2024, the organization had paid 8,122 people.

== History ==
Barbara Harris founded the organization in Anaheim, California in 1997 as Children Requiring a Caring Kommunity (CRACK) after she and her husband adopted four children, one-by-one as each was born, from a drug-addicted mother. Each of the four adopted children is separated in age by only one year. With the experience of helping the children through withdrawal and other health problems, she tried to get legislation passed in California that would have mandated long-term birth control for mothers who gave birth to babies who were exposed to cocaine as fetuses. After this failed, she started what is now called Project Prevention.

== Activities ==
Project Prevention says their main goal is to promote awareness of the dangers of using drugs during pregnancy. They are better known, however, for paying drug addicts cash for volunteering for long-term birth control, including sterilization. The organization offers US$300 (£200 in the UK) to each participant. The New York Times reports that the organization initially offered more money to women who chose tubal ligations and men who chose vasectomies than to those who chose long-term birth control like intrauterine devices, but criticism forced them to adopt a flat rate. To receive the money, clients must show evidence they have been arrested on a drug-related offence, or provide a doctor's certificate saying they use drugs, and further evidence is needed confirming that the birth-control procedure has taken place. The organization keeps statistics on its activities through survey forms that all participants fill out, before any procedure is completed. As of July 2024, out of 8,122 clients it had paid: 4,956 (61%) were white; 1,714 (21.1%) black; 845 (10.4%) Hispanic; 597 (7.4%) other.

== Criticism and response ==
The organization has used slogans such as "Don't let pregnancy get in the way of your crack habit" and "She has her Daddy's eyes and her Mommy's heroin addiction". In interviews Harris said "We don't allow dogs to breed. We spay them. We neuter them. We try to keep them from having unwanted puppies, and yet these women are literally having litters of children", and that "we campaign to neuter dogs and yet we allow women to have 10 or 12 kids that they can't take care of". On the television news program 60 Minutes II Harris was asked about these comments and said, "Well, you know my son that goes to Stanford said 'mom, please don't ever say that again,' but it's the truth, they don't just have one and two babies, they have litters." More recently, Harris has offered a softer response to criticism: "I guess it depends on where your heart is. Some people are so into the women and their rights to get pregnant that they seem to forget about the rights of the kids. They act like these children don't matter. People need to realize these women don't want to have babies that are taken away from them. Nothing positive comes to the woman who has eight children taken away from her."

Opponents of the organization often argue that it should instead focus on addiction treatment or lobbying for government health care. The organization responds by saying that they do not have the resources to solve "national problems of poverty, housing, nutrition, education and rehabilitation services. Those resources we do have are spent to prevent a problem for $300 rather than paying millions after it happens in cost to care for a potentially damaged child." Weaning one opioid-addicted baby off drugs costs about $500,000.

The organization has been harshly criticized by many as potentially leading to eugenic outcomes.

== United Kingdom ==
Project Prevention began operating in the UK in 2010. In May 2010 a woman, not an addict, was leaving a clinic in Glasgow in what she described as "the Possilpark area—it's a well-known area for drugs" accompanied by her nine-year-old son when she was approached by three women who said they were from the organization and who offered her £200 if she agreed to be sterilized. The woman said the same group had been approaching other women, and she later informed Strathclyde police, who advised anyone approached in a similar way to contact them. The first UK client was "John", a drug user since the age of 12, who accepted money to have a vasectomy, saying he should never be a father.

The organization has been criticized in the UK. Addaction, an addiction charity, said its practices are "morally reprehensible and irrelevant". Martin Barnes, CEO of DrugScope, said the organization's activities were exploitative, ethically dubious, and morally questionable. Harris admitted her methods amounted to bribery, but said it was the only way to stop babies being physically and mentally damaged by drugs during pregnancy. The British Medical Association (BMA) said it did not have a view on the organization:

As with all requests for treatment, doctors need to be confident that the individual has the capacity to make the specific decision at the time the decision is required. The BMA's ethics committee also believes that doctors should inform patients of the benefits of reversible contraception so that the patients have more reproductive choices in the future.

On 18 October 2010, the BBC broadcast a program, Sterilising the Addicts, about the organization. A similar program, Addicts: No Children Allowed, was broadcast in Scotland by BBC Scotland.

== Ireland ==
Harris said in 2010 that Project Prevention might expand their activities to Ireland. In response Fiona Weldon, clinical director of Dublin addictions treatment facility, the Rutland Centre, said it was "absolutely horrendous", and that the organization was misguided and could be leaving itself open to litigation in the future. Tony Geoghegan, CEO of drug addiction and homeless charity Merchants Quay Ireland, said it was inappropriate to sterilize addicts.

== See also ==
- Child Abuse Prevention
- Eugenics
- Moral hazard
- Recreational drugs in pregnancy

== Sources ==
- Paltrow, Lynn M. (Winter 2003). ""Why Caring Communities Must Oppose C.R.A.C.K./Project Prevention: How C.R.A.C.K. Promotes Dangerous Propaganda and Undermines the Health and Well Being of Children and Families"". Archived from the original on 2011-08-10. (505 KB). The Journal of Law in Society (Wayne State University) 5 (11): 11–117.
