= Priscilla J. Smith =

American attorney

Priscilla Smith
- Born: 1963 (age 62–63)
- Occupations: Program Director, Program for the Study of Reproductive Justice

Academic background
- Education: Yale University (BA)

Academic work
- Discipline: Reproductive Justice

Priscilla J. Smith (born 1963) is an American attorney and professor, notable for her advocacy for abortion in the United States. She is currently employed as a Clinical Lecturer and Program Director for the Study of Reproductive Justice at The Yale Law School. She previously served as an attorney and U.S. Legal Program Director at the Center For Reproductive Law & Policy.

== Notable Work ==
Smith gained fame for her role in the landmark Supreme Court case Gonzales v. Carhart in 2007. She argued on behalf of abortion provider LeRoy Carhart to challenge the constitutionality of the Partial-Birth Abortion Ban Act, a federal law banning the practice of intact dilation and extraction. The Supreme Court, in the majority opinion authored by Justice Anthony Kennedy, upheld the law and ruled against Carhart.

In 2001, she also argued in Ferguson v. City of Charleston against nonconsensual drug testing for obstetrics patients at Medical University of South Carolina. The women who were tested positive were often arrested and imprisoned on child abuse charges. The Supreme Court ruled that the forced drug tests were unconstitutional and a violation of the Fourth Amendment.

In 2017, Smith testified before the United States House of Representatives Subcommittee on the Constitution and Civil Justice, arguing against the constitutionality of the Heartbeat Protection Act.

== Education ==
Smith received her BA from Yale College in 1984 and her JD from Yale Law School in 1991.
