= Prenatal cocaine exposure =

Medical syndrome

Prenatal cocaine exposure (PCE), theorized in the 1970s, occurs when a pregnant woman uses cocaine including crack cocaine and thereby exposes her fetus to the drug. Babies whose mothers used cocaine while pregnant supposedly have increased risk of several different health issues during growth and development and are colloquially known as crack babies.

PCE is very difficult to study, because it rarely occurs in isolation; usually it coexists with a variety of other factors, which may confound a study's results. Pregnant mothers who use cocaine often use other drugs in addition, may be malnourished and lacking in medical care, are at risk of violence, and may neglect their children. Children with PCE in foster care may experience problems due to unstable family situations. Factors such as poverty that are frequently associated with PCE have a much stronger influence on children's intellectual and academic abilities than does exposure to cocaine in isolation. Thus, researchers have had difficulty in determining which effects result from PCE and which result from other factors in the children's histories.

PCE is associated with premature birth, birth defects, attention deficit hyperactivity disorder, and other conditions. The effects of cocaine on a fetus are thought to be similar to those of tobacco, and are less severe than those of alcohol. No scientific evidence has shown a difference in harm to a fetus between crack and powder cocaine.

No specific disorders or conditions have been found to result from people whose mothers used cocaine while pregnant. PCE appears to have little effect on infant growth. Studies focusing on children six years and younger have not shown any direct, long-term effects of PCE on language, growth, or development as measured by test scores.

== In the media ==
"Crack baby" (or "cocaine baby" and "crack kid") was a term coined to describe children who were exposed to crack cocaine as fetuses, which emerged in the US during the 1980s and 1990s amid a crack epidemic. Early studies reported that people who had been exposed to crack in utero would be severely emotionally, mentally, and physically disabled; this belief became common in the scientific and lay communities. Fears were widespread that a generation of cocaine-exposed children was going to put severe strain on society and social services as they grew up. Later studies failed to substantiate the findings of earlier ones that PCE has severe disabling consequences; these earlier studies had been methodologically flawed (e.g., with small sample sizes and confounding factors). Scientists have come to understand that the findings of the early studies may have been overstated.

== Historical context ==
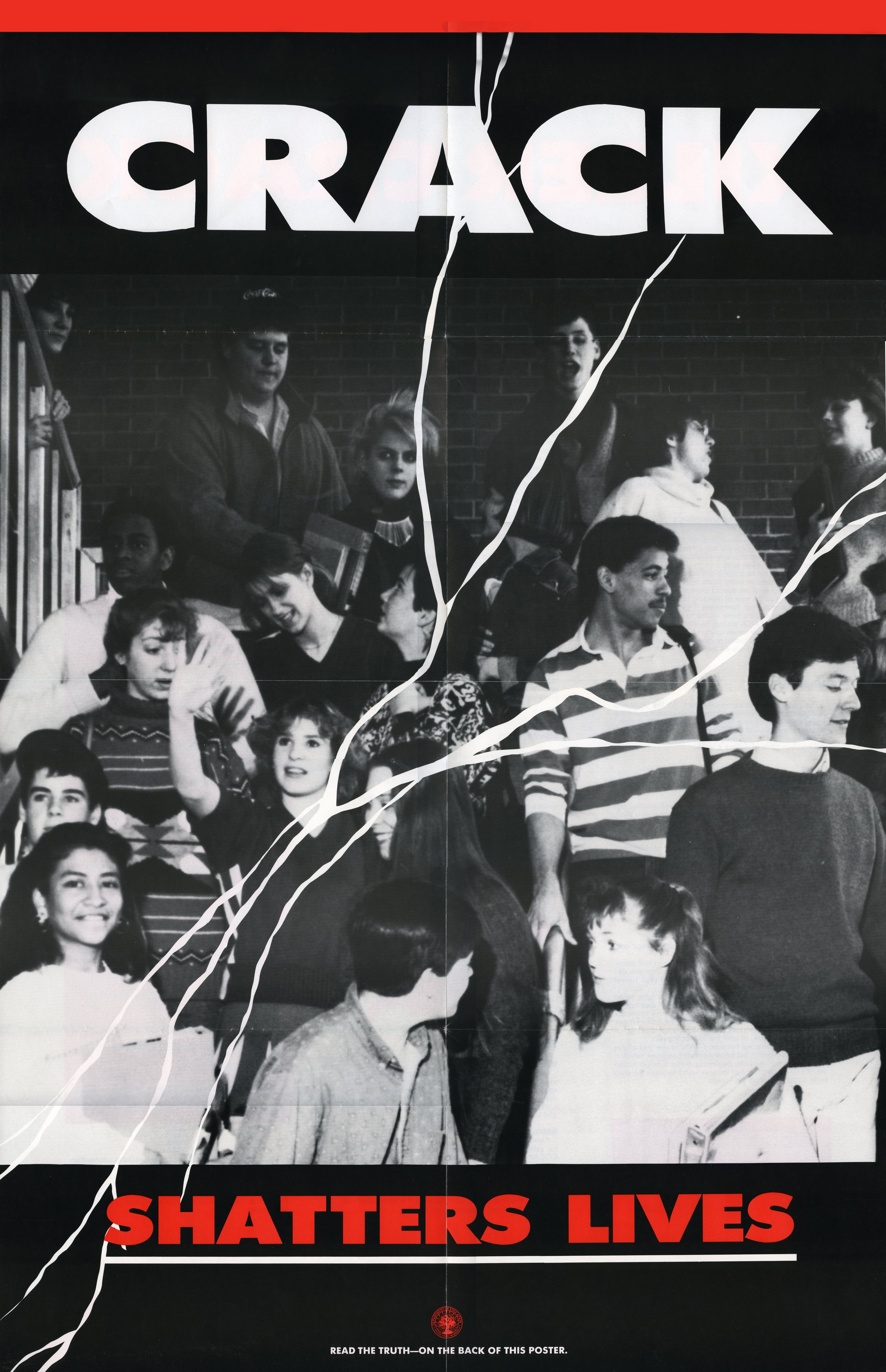
The US government published posters like this one in the 1980s and 1990s to warn people away from crack.

During the 1980s and 1990s, a surge occurred in the use of crack cocaine in US cities: the crack epidemic. During this time, fears arose throughout the country that PCE would create a generation of youth with severe behavioral and cognitive problems. Early studies in the mid-1980s reported that cocaine use in pregnancy caused children to have severe problems, including cognitive, developmental, and emotional disruption. These early studies had methodological problems, including small sample size, confounding factors such as poor nutrition, and use of other drugs by the mothers. The results of the studies, though, sparked widespread media discussion in the context of the new war on drugs. For example, a 1985 study that showed harmful effects of cocaine use during pregnancy created a huge media buzz. The term "crack baby" resulted from the publicity surrounding crack and PCE.

Media reports commonly emphasized that babies who had been exposed to crack in utero would never develop normally. The children were reported to be inevitably destined to be physically and mentally disabled for their whole lives. Babies exposed to crack in utero were written off as doomed to be severely disabled, and many were abandoned in hospitals. They were expected to be unable to form normal social bonds. Experts foresaw the development of a "biological underclass" of born criminals who would prey on the rest of the population. Crime rates were predicted to rise when the generation of crack-exposed infants grew up (instead, they dropped). The children were predicted to be difficult to console, irritable, and hyperactive, putting a strain on the school system. Charles Krauthammer, a columnist for The Washington Post wrote in 1989, "[t]heirs will be a life of certain suffering, of probable deviance, of permanent inferiority." The president of Boston University at the time, John Silber, said, "crack babies ... won't ever achieve the intellectual development to have consciousness of God." These claims of biological inferiority played easily into existing class and racial biases. Reporting was often sensational, favoring the direst predictions and shutting out skeptics.

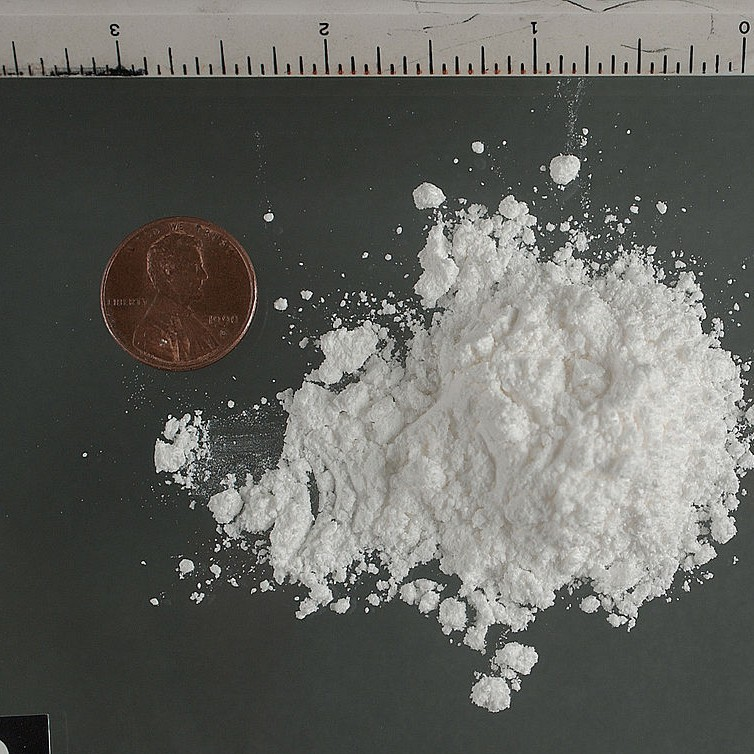
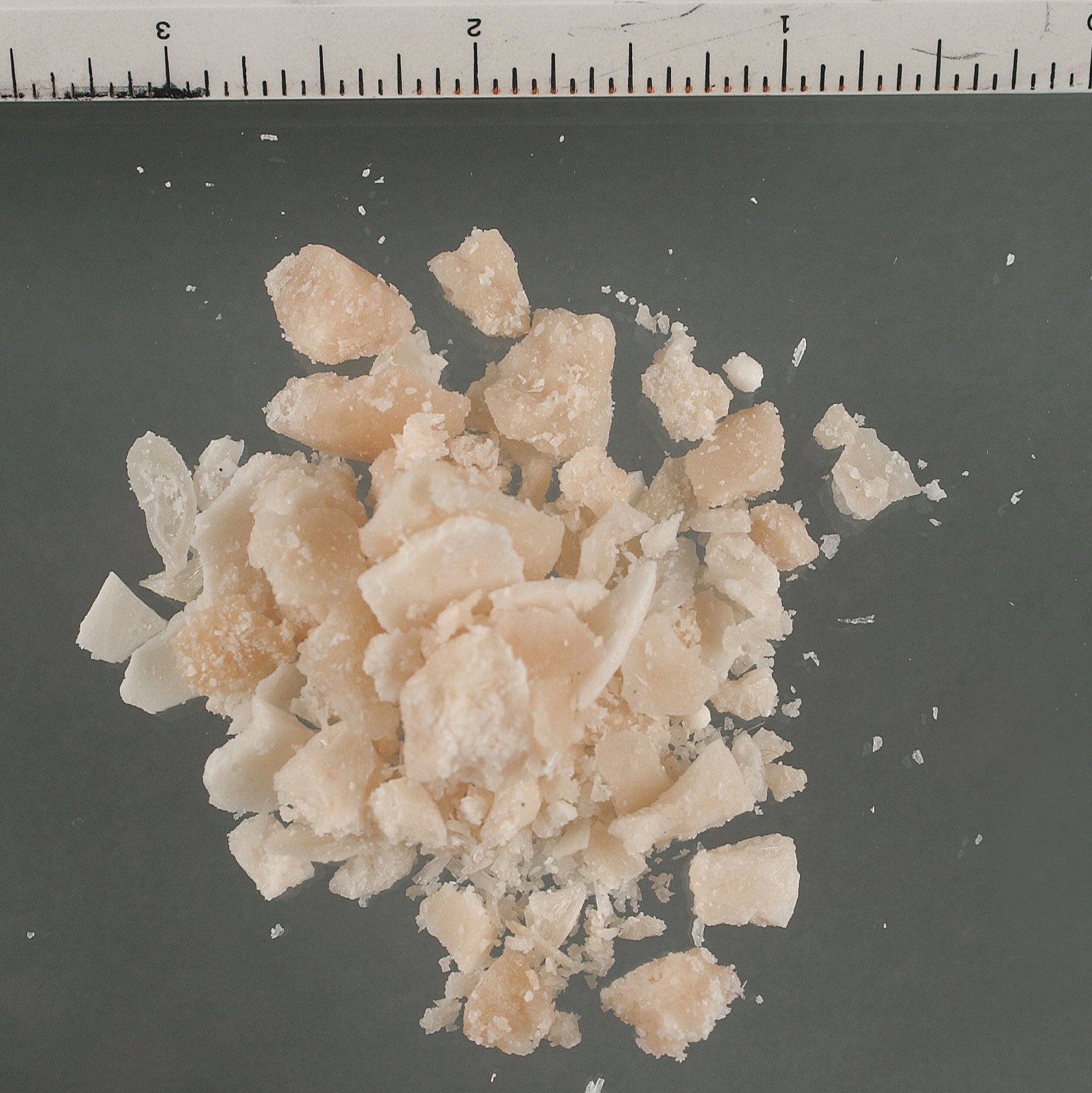
Powder (left) and crack cocaine (right)

Reporting on the effects of PCE may have been affected by publication bias, a disproportionate publication of studies indicating more severe outcomes as the crack epidemic emerged. Scientific studies that reported PCE to have significant effects were more likely to be published than those that did not. Between 1980 and 1989, 57% of studies showing cocaine has effects on a fetus were accepted by the Society for Pediatric Research, compared with only 11% of studies showing no effects. Findings that other factors such as prematurity were behind symptoms that cocaine-exposed babies showed did not "fit within the narrative of what had become a national scare" and were given less attention. Ideas about severe effects of PCE may have been more readily embraced because they "fit in with cultural stereotypes".

At the time, the proposed mechanism by which cocaine harmed fetuses was as a stimulant— cocaine was predicted to disrupt normal development of parts of the brain that dealt with stimulation, resulting in problems such as bipolar disorder and attention deficit disorder. Reports from the mid-1980s to early '90s raised concerns about links between PCE and slowed growth, deformed limbs, defects of the kidneys and genitourinary and gastrointestinal systems, neurological damage, small head size, atrophy or cysts in the cerebral cortex, bleeding into the brain's ventricles, and obstruction of blood supply in the central nervous system.

After the early studies that reported that PCE children would be severely disabled, came studies that purported to show that cocaine exposure in utero has no important effects. Almost every prenatal complication originally thought to be due directly to PCE was found to result from confounding factors such as poor maternal nutrition, use of other drugs, depression, and lack of prenatal care. More recently, the scientific community has begun to reach an understanding that PCE does have some important effects, but that they are not as severe as was predicted in the early studies. The effects of PCE are subtle, but they exist. Most people who were exposed to cocaine in utero are normal or close to it.

== Pathophysiology ==
Cocaine is a small enough molecule to pass across the placental barrier into the bloodstream of the fetus.

Cocaine, a small molecule, can cross the placenta into the bloodstream of the fetus. In fact, it may be present in a higher concentration in the amniotic fluid than it is in the mother's bloodstream. The skin of the fetus can absorb the chemical directly from the amniotic fluid until the 24th week of pregnancy. Cocaine can also show up in breast milk and affect the nursing baby. The severity of effects depends on how much of the drug is used, how often, and the stage in the development of the fetus.

Cocaine prevents the reuptake of the neurotransmitters dopamine, serotonin, and norepinephrine. Thus, they stay in the synapse longer, causing excitement of the sympathetic nervous system and evoking a stress response. The euphoria experienced by cocaine users is thought to be largely due to the way it prevents these neurotransmitters from being reabsorbed by the presynaptic neuron that released it.

Use of cocaine during pregnancy can negatively affect both the mother and the fetus, but how it affects the fetus is poorly understood. Three main mechanisms of cocaine exposure can harm a fetus, by altering brain chemistry, altering the expression of certain genes, and the constriction of blood vessels. The neurotransmitters affected by cocaine are involved in the development of the fetus's brain, so the drug may affect fetal development directly by altering the development of the brain's monoaminergic system. The most important way cocaine affects fetal development is by binding to dopamine receptors. Cocaine decreases a fetus's ability to synthesize and release dopamine and increases the density of dopamine receptors on the surfaces of neurons.

Another possible mechanism by which cocaine harms the fetus may be in part by interfering with blood supply to the uterus. Cocaine causes vasoconstriction (narrowing of blood vessels) in both mother and fetus, which can cause hypoxia in the fetus. Constricting blood vessels causes tissues to receive insufficient blood flow, killing cells, but this effect is less pronounced with cocaine than with nicotine. The reduction in blood flow to the uterus limits the delivery of oxygen and nutrients to the fetus. Cocaine also constricts the blood vessels in the fetus, which is potentially linked to slowed fetal growth and abnormal development of the genitourinary, cardiovascular, digestive, and musculoskeletal systems. Cocaine causes changes in the mother's blood pressure that are thought to be the cause of strokes in the fetus; one study found that 6% of cocaine-exposed infants had had one or more strokes. Such prenatal strokes may be the cause of neurological problems found in some cocaine-exposed infants after birth. Blood vessel contraction can also cause premature labor and premature birth. Cocaine has also been found to enhance the contractility of the tissue in the uterus, another factor that has been suggested as a possible mechanism for its contribution to increased prematurity rates. Increased contractility of the uterus may also be behind the increased likelihood of placental abruption (the placenta tearing away from the uterine wall), which some findings have linked with PCE.

== Diagnosis ==
Cocaine use during pregnancy can be discovered by asking the mother, but sometimes women will not admit to having used drugs. Mothers may lie for fear of prosecution or having their children taken away, but even when they are willing to tell the truth, their memories may not be very accurate. Determining the purity of the drug they have taken also may not be possible. More reliable methods for detecting cocaine exposure involve testing the newborn's hair or meconium (the infant's earliest stool). Hair analysis, however, can give false positives for cocaine exposure, and a newborn may not have enough hair to test. The newborn's urine can be tested for cocaine and metabolites, but it must be collected as soon as possible after birth. It is not known how long after exposure the markers will still show up in a newborn's urine. The mother's urine can also be tested for drugs, but it cannot detect drugs used too far in the past or determine how much or how often the drugs were used. Tests cannot generally detect cocaine use over a week prior to sample collection. Mothers are more honest about cocaine use when their urine is also tested, but many users still deny it. Both maternal and neonatal urine tests can give false negatives.

== Effects and prognosis ==
As of 2014, studies had returned widely varying reports of the effects of PCE; some claimed the physical disabilities are severe and generalized, others find specific effects, and others none at all.

=== Timing ===
The timing of the dose of the drug is an important determinant of outcome, in addition to how much is used, for how long, and what kind of care is rendered after birth. Drug use in the first trimester is the most harmful to the fetus in terms of neurological and developmental outcome. The effects of PCE later in a child's life are poorly understood; as of 2010, little information was available about the effects of in utero cocaine exposure on children over the age of five. Some studies have found PCE-related differences in height and weight, while others have not; these differences are generally either small or are gone by the time children are of school age. Much is unknown about what factors may exist to aid children who were exposed to cocaine in utero. Whether the effects of PCE are increased once children reach adolescence was unknown in 2013, as was whether the neural rewiring that occurs during this developmental period attenuates the effects. A review of 27 studies performed between 2006 and 2012 found that cognitive development was mildly to moderately affected in PCE adolescents, but how important these effects were in practical terms was unclear.

=== Confounding factors ===
Unlike fetal alcohol syndrome, no set of characteristics has been discovered that results uniquely from cocaine exposure in utero. Cocaine exposure in utero may affect the structure and function of the brain, predisposing children to developmental problems later, or these effects may be explained by children of crack-using mothers being at higher risk for domestic violence, deadbeat parenting, and maternal depression. As of 2008, when researchers were able to identify effects of PCE, they were typically small.

=== Pregnancy and birth ===
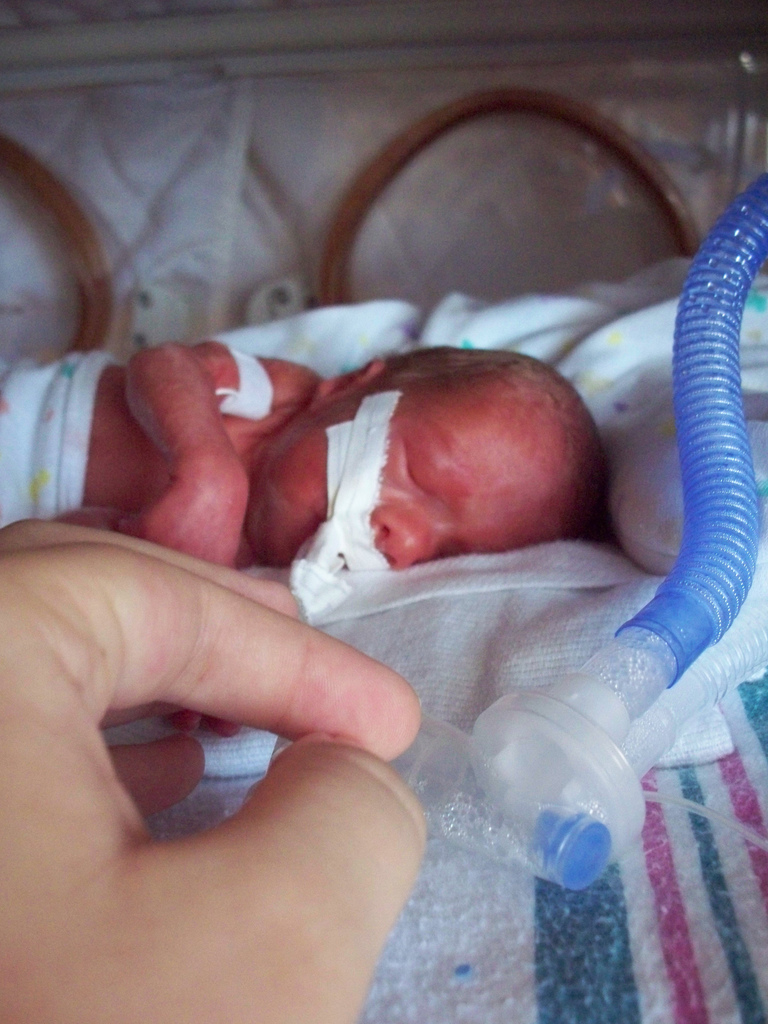
Premature baby

As of 2013, studies had found after controlling for other factors that some effects are present in pregnancies involving cocaine: abruptio placenta, prematurity, low birth weight, and small size compared to babies of the same gestational time. PCE newborns have smaller heads and shorter bodies. PCE effects are more severe when the amounts of cocaine are greater. As many as 17–27% of cocaine-using pregnant women deliver prematurely. In association with prematurity, growth in the womb is reduced, and low birth weight is connected to PCE. Also, some data associate spontaneous abortion with cocaine use. Cocaine reduces the appetite and has been linked with reduced maternal weight gain during pregnancy; in addition, constriction of the blood vessels may further limit supply of nutrients to the fetus. Using cocaine while pregnant also heightens the chances of maternal and fetal vitamin deficiencies, respiratory distress syndrome for the baby, and infarction of the bowels. Early reports found that cocaine-exposed babies were at high risk for sudden infant death syndrome; however, by itself, cocaine exposure during fetal development has not subsequently been identified as a risk factor for the syndrome. Some PCE children experience hypertonia (excessive muscle tone), and reduced reflexes and motor function have been found in babies four to six weeks old.

=== Withdrawal ===
While newborns who were exposed prenatally to drugs such as barbiturates or heroin frequently have symptoms of drug withdrawal (neonatal abstinence syndrome), this does not happen with babies exposed to crack in utero; at least, such symptoms are difficult to separate in the context of other factors such as prematurity or prenatal exposure to other drugs.

=== Mental, emotional, and behavioral outcomes ===
As of 2013, studies had shown small deficits in behavioral, cognitive, attention, emotional, and language function in PCE infants, children, and adolescents, but in 2015, other studies attributed findings of negative effects on cognitive development to confounding factors. Studies suggest that the environment in which a child grows up makes a more important contribution to outcomes in cognitive, behavioral, and other outcomes than does the cocaine exposure itself. School performance is mildly affected in older children. In a 2015 IQ study, cocaine-exposed children did not appear to score lower than others. Although PCE is correlated with low IQ scores, scientists generally believe that PCE alone does not cause this effect; rather, it is more likely due to associated factors. In school-aged and younger children, PCE does not appear in studies to predispose children to poorer intellectual performance. Poor performance on IQ tests could actually be due to trouble with sustaining attention if the tests fail to account for this factor separately.

=== Brain growth ===
Cocaine causes impaired growth of the fetus's brain, an effect that is most pronounced with high levels of cocaine and prolonged duration of exposure throughout all three trimesters of pregnancy. Prenatal cocaine exposure has been found to affect the cognitive performance of individuals and affect speech and language development, behavior, physical and cognitive growth, and function. The more of the substance the fetus is exposed to, the more of an effect it can have on the overall development, as well as running the risk of being fatal to the fetus during the prenatal stage(s) of pregnancy. The effects of cocaine use can cause an increased chance of premature birth, affecting the body weight, height, and the growth of the organs and brain due to the premature state of the baby, as well as the impact of the harmful substances the baby was exposed to. This can have effects on other areas, such as brain development. Being exposed to a stimulant such as cocaine can cause damage and issues in development over time. In behavior, cognition, memory, grasping of information, and attention are areas that are common struggles for children who were exposed to cocaine in the womb. These effects are seen in individuals reaching the age of 10 and older.

Long-term studies have shown that alterations in the structure and function of the brain occur when exposed to these drugs, which can cause changes in the behaviors of the individual over time, and they develop and grow. All of the effects physically and cognitively vary for each individual based on their level of exposure to the drug, the gestational timing of the fetus as it develops, which determines possible physical effects, and the care they receive after being born. Studies that use neuroimaging such as magnetic resonance imaging (MRI) and FMRI have shown differences in brain structure of PCE children, for example, in the cerebral cortex and limbic system. PCE babies were found to have less grey matter in the cerebral cortex and poorer connections between the cortex and the thalamus, associated with physical and cognitive developmental delays. Studies have found that children exposed to cocaine during fetal development experience problems with language, behavior, development, and attention. However these effects are small, especially when studies control for other factors like exposure to other drugs. Cognitive and attention skills can be impacted by PCE, possibly due to effects on brain areas such as the prefrontal cortex. Brain areas in the frontal lobe involved in dealing with stress, attention, and impulsiveness seem to be particularly impacted by PCE, as evidenced by neuroimaging studies that show abnormalities in these areas of the brain. PCE infants are more jittery and excitable and have lower arousal and self-regulation; such behavioral effects may persist or worsen after 12 months of age. Children whose mothers used cocaine during pregnancy may develop symptoms akin to those of attention deficit disorder, and a link has been found between the disorder itself and PCE. Mild deficits in language have been found in older PCE children. Language development is impaired, possibly into late adolescence, but adolescents up to age 17 may improve their receptive language skills.

=== Behavior ===
Evidence suggests that in utero cocaine exposure leads to problems with behavior and sustained attention, possibly by affecting parts of the brain that are vulnerable to toxins during fetal development. School-age PCE children have been found to have trouble regulating their behavior and sustaining their attention. Children who had been exposed to high levels of cocaine in utero show poorer behavioral inhibition than those with lower levels of exposure or unexposed children. The changes in behavior and attention caused by PCE are measurable by standardized scales; however, these behavioral effects seem to be mild. Children exposed to cocaine in the first trimester are less sociable, more withdrawn, and show more anxious and depressed behaviors. Those exposed to higher doses of cocaine have been reported to show aggressive and disruptive behaviors. PCE girls are seven times more likely to have delinquent behavioral problems, but PCE boys are no more likely than other boys. Studies from the 2000s and 2010s are conflicted on whether PCE adolescents are at greater risk for use of drugs such as cocaine, alcohol, and marijuana. A 2010 study found that PCE adolescent girls had higher rates of anxiety than their non-exposed peers.

=== Physical outcomes ===
Slowed growth is well documented in fetuses, but it is not as clear whether older children remain smaller or catch up to their peers. Some studies show that growth remains slowed for as many as ten years. PCE may also interfere with the way the motor system matures. Motor effects that have been documented include poorer reflexes and quality of movement in infants. PCE may affect the neuroendocrine system, but more study is needed to determine whether it does and what the effects are.

=== Birth defects ===
A review of the literature reported that cocaine use causes congenital defects between 15 and 20% of the time; however, another large-scale study found no difference in rates of birth anomalies in PCE and non-PCE infants. It has been suggested that some birth defects could be due to cocaine's disruption of blood vessel growth. Most PCE-related congenital defects are found in the brain, heart, genitourinary tract, arms, and legs. Cocaine use by pregnant mothers may directly or indirectly contribute to defects in the formation of the circulatory system and is associated with abnormalities in the development of the aorta. Heart malformations can include a missing ventricle and defects with the septum of the heart, and can result in potentially deadly congestive heart failure. Genital malformations occur at a higher-than-normal rate with PCE. The liver and lungs are also at higher risk for abnormalities. Cloverleaf skull, a congenital malformation in which the skull has three lobes, the brain is deformed, and hydrocephalus occurs, is also associated with PCE. Like birth defects, small head size, and stroke are risks in PCE.

== Epidemiology ==
Of all cocaine users, women of childbearing age comprise 15–17%. An estimated 0.6 to 3% of pregnant women in the developed world use cocaine. A 1995 survey in the US found that between 30,000 and 160,000 cases of prenatal exposure to cocaine occur each year. By one estimate, in the US 100,000 babies are born each year after having been exposed to crack cocaine in utero. An estimated 7.5 million PCE children are living in the US. Pregnant women in urban parts of the US and who are of a low socioeconomic status use cocaine more often. A 2020 study found that 0.3% of respondents admitted to using cocaine while pregnant. However, the real prevalence of cocaine use by pregnant women is unknown.

== Legal and ethical issues ==
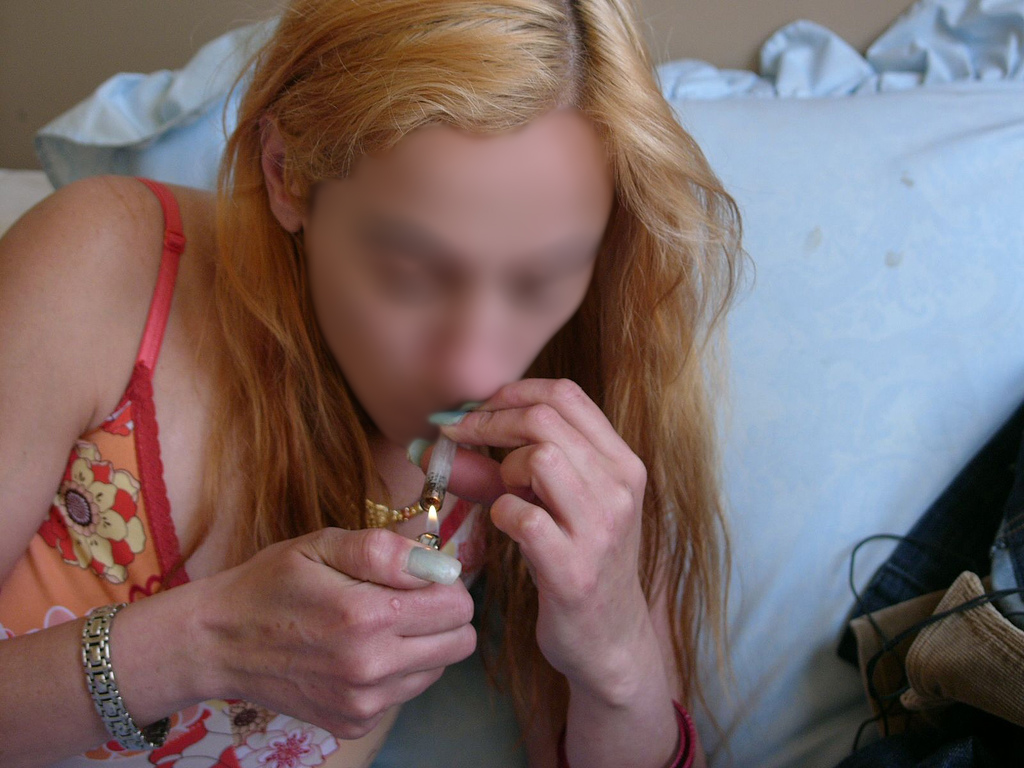
Women have been prosecuted for using crack while pregnant.

The harm to a child from PCE has implications for public policy and law. Some US states have pressed charges against pregnant women who use drugs, including assault with a deadly weapon, corruption of a minor, manslaughter, child abuse, and distribution of drugs to a minor. However, these approaches have generally been rejected in the courts on the basis that a fetus is not legally a child. Between 1985 and 2001, more than 200 women in over 30 US states faced prosecution for drug use during pregnancy. In South Carolina, a woman who used crack in her third trimester of pregnancy was sentenced to prison for eight years when her child was born with cocaine metabolites in its system. The Supreme Court of South Carolina upheld this conviction. As of 2013, all but one of the women prosecuted in the US for drug use while pregnant have won their cases on appeal.

From 1989 to 1994, amid public outcry about cocaine babies, the Medical University of South Carolina tested pregnant women for cocaine, reporting those who tested positive to the police. The US Supreme Court found the policy to be unacceptable on constitutional grounds in 2001. Some advocates argue that punishment for crack-using pregnant women as a means to treat their addiction is a violation of their right to privacy. According to studies, fear of prosecution and having children taken away is associated with a refusal to seek prenatal care or medical treatment.

Some nonprofit organizations aim to prevent PCE with birth control. One such initiative, Project Prevention, offers women addicted to cocaine money as an incentive to undergo long-term birth control or, frequently, sterilization—an approach which has led to public outcry from those who consider this practice to be eugenics.

== Social stigma ==
Children who were exposed to crack prenatally faced social stigma as babies and school-aged children; some experts say that the "crack baby" stigma was more harmful than the PCE. Teachers were affected by these cultural stereotypes; such biases may have negatively affected the educational experiences of children thus stigmatized. Teachers who knew that specific children had been exposed to crack in utero may have expected these children to be disruptive and developmentally delayed. Children who were exposed to cocaine might be teased by others who knew of the exposure, and problems these children had might be misdiagnosed by doctors or others as resulting from PCE when they may really have been due to factors like illness or abuse. Commentators have characterized the phenomenon as a moral panic. The social stigma of the drug also complicated studies of PCE; researchers labored under the awareness that their findings would have political implications. In addition, the perceived hopelessness of 'crack babies' may have caused researchers to ignore possibilities for early intervention that could have helped them. The social stigma may turn out to be a self-fulfilling prophecy.

== Research ==
=== Confounding factors ===
A number of the effects that had been thought after early studies to be attributable to prenatal exposure to cocaine are actually due partially or wholly to other factors, such as exposure to other substances (including tobacco, alcohol, or marijuana) or to the environment in which the child is raised.

PCE is very difficult to study because of a variety of factors that may confound the results: pre- and postnatal care may be poor; the pregnant mother and child may be malnourished; the amount of cocaine a mother takes can vary; she may take a variety of drugs during pregnancy in addition to cocaine; measurements for detecting deficits may not be sensitive enough; and results that are found may only last a short time. Studies differ in how they define heavy or light cocaine use during pregnancy, and the period of exposure during pregnancy on which they focus (e.g., first, second, or third trimester. Drug use by mothers puts children at high risk for exposure to toxic or otherwise dangerous environments, and PCE does not present much risk beyond these risk factors. PCE is clustered with other risk factors to the child, such as physical abuse and neglect, domestic violence, and prenatal exposure to other substances. Such environmental factors are known to adversely affect children in the same areas being studied concerning PCE. Most women who use cocaine while pregnant use other drugs too; one study found that 93% of those who use cocaine or opiates also use tobacco, marijuana, or alcohol. When researchers control for use of other drugs, many of the seeming effects of cocaine on head size, birth weight, Apgar scores, and prematurity disappear.

Addiction to any substance, including crack, may be a risk factor for child abuse or neglect. Crack addiction, like other addictions, distracts parents from the child and leads to inattentive parenting. Mothers who continue to use drugs once their babies are born have trouble forming the normal parental bonds, more often interacting with their babies with a detached, unenthusiastic, flat demeanor. Conversely, low-stress environments and responsive caregiving may provide a protective effect on the child's brain, potentially compensating for negative effects of PCE. Many drug users do not get prenatal care, for a variety of reasons, including that they may not know they are pregnant. Many crack addicts get no medical care at all and have extremely poor diets, and children who live around crack smoking are at risk of inhaling secondary smoke. Cocaine using mothers also have a higher rate of sexually transmitted infections such as HIV and hepatitis.

In some cases, it is not clear whether the direct results of PCE lead to behavioral problems or whether environmental factors are at fault. For example, children who have caregiver instability may have more behavioral problems as a result, or it may be that behavioral problems manifested by PCE children lead to greater turnover in caregivers. Other factors that make studying PCE difficult include unwillingness of mothers to tell the truth about drug history, uncertainty of dosages of street drugs, and high rates of attrition (loss of participants) from studies.

=== Animal models ===
One way to address problems with uncertainty about cocaine's effects due to confounding factors is to use animal models; these allow experimenters to study the effects at specific doses and times. Studies have used mice, other rodents, rabbits, and primates. However, differences between species' physiology and gestation times mean findings in animals may not apply to humans. Mice, rats, and rabbits have shorter gestational times, so experimenters must continue giving drugs after they are born to more closely model human gestation; however this introduces more differences. Animals and humans metabolize drugs at different rates, and drugs that are highly teratogenic in animals may not be in humans and vice versa. Animals cannot be used to measure differences in abilities such as reasoning that are only found in humans. Animal studies in various species have found that cocaine impacts brain structure, function, and chemistry, and causes long-term changes at the molecular, cellular, and behavioral levels. Animal Model Studies have shown that cocaine has the ability to cross the placenta and the blood brain barrier in the body. This is yet another example of the damage that can be done that can impact and effect the brain and body function and health overall. While the animal model is not as reliable for certain tests because we function differently, this test in particular gives us the idea of the level of damage that can be cause to the fetus of a pregnant women using cocaine during her pregnancy. In research studies on pregnant rats, injected cocaine did less damage to cells than injected nicotine, and more recovery occurred between doses. Adult rats that were exposed to cocaine prenatally have deficits in learning, memory, and motor skills, and may have abnormalities in dopamine processing. Animal research has also shown that offspring of males that used cocaine while their sperm were forming may go on to have abnormalities later in life.
