= Ferguson v. City of Charleston =

- Supreme Court of the United States

Argued October 4, 2000 Decided March 21, 2001
- Full case name: Crystal M. Ferguson et al. v. City of Charleston, South Carolina, et al.
- Citations: 532 U.S. 67 (more) 121 S. Ct. 1281; 149 L. Ed. 2d 205

Case history
- Prior: Verdict for respondents affirmed by the Fourth Circuit, 186 F.3d 469 (4th Cir. 1999); cert. granted, 528 U.S. 1187 (2000).

Holding
- A state hospital's attempt to gather evidence of a patient's criminal conduct for law enforcement purposes constitutes an unreasonable search unless the patient consents.

Court membership
- Chief Justice William Rehnquist Associate Justices John P. Stevens · Sandra Day O'Connor; Antonin Scalia · Anthony Kennedy; David Souter · Clarence Thomas; Ruth Bader Ginsburg · Stephen Breyer

Case opinions
- Majority: Stevens, joined by O'Connor, Souter, Ginsburg, Breyer
- Concurrence: Kennedy (in judgment)
- Dissent: Scalia, joined by Rehnquist, Thomas

Laws applied
- U.S. Const. amend. IV

Ferguson v. City of Charleston, 532 U.S. 67 (2001), is a United States Supreme Court decision that found Medical University of South Carolina's policy regarding involuntary drug testing of pregnant women to violate the Fourth Amendment. The Court held that the search in question was unreasonable.

== Facts ==
In the fall of 1988, staff at a hospital operated by the Medical University of South Carolina became concerned about the prevalence of so-called "crack babies," as well as an increase in cocaine use among pregnant women receiving prenatal treatment at the hospital. In the spring of 1989, hospital staff began conducting urine screens on pregnant women, and referring the women who tested positive for counseling. Soon after the urine screenings began, the case manager in the hospital's obstetrics department heard that police in Greenville, South Carolina, were arresting pregnant women who used cocaine for child abuse. The theory behind the arrests was that the women's cocaine use was harmful to the fetuses. After reviewing the idea with counsel, the MUSC hospital began referring pregnant women who tested positive for cocaine to Charleston police for prosecution.

Acting together, hospital staff and the police department developed a written policy for determining which pregnant women would be screened and, if they tested positive, prosecuted. Women would be selected for urine screening if they met certain criteria, such as prior lack of prenatal care, known history of drug or alcohol abuse, intrauterine fetal death, or abruptio placentae. If the women tested positive, they were referred to substance abuse counseling and threatened with prosecution. The hospital staff acknowledged that the "threat of law enforcement intervention... provided the necessary leverage to make the policy effective." Women who tested positive a second time were arrested, even before giving birth. If the positive test occurred prior to the 28th week of pregnancy, the woman would be charged with simple possession. If she tested positive in the 28th week or later, she would be charged with possession and distribution to a person under age 18—to wit, the fetus. If she delivered the baby "while testing positive for illegal drugs," the woman would also be charged with unlawful neglect of a child.

Thirty pregnant women who had been arrested pursuant to the policy brought suit in federal court, challenging the MUSC policy of conducting warrantless, nonconsensual drug testing as violating their Fourth Amendment right to be free from unreasonable searches and seizures. The hospital and the city raised two primary defenses—first, that the women had consented to the searches; and second, that even if they had not consented, the searches were reasonable as a matter of law because they were justified by "special non-law-enforcement purposes." The district court rejected the second defense because it concluded that the searches were conducted for law enforcement purposes. It submitted the first defense to the jury, instructing the jury that if the jury found that the women had consented, the jury should rule for the city and the hospital. The jury found that the women had consented, and thus ruled for the city and the hospital. The women appealed and Priscilla J. Smith argued for their behalf.

On appeal, the Fourth Circuit affirmed, but on the ground that the searches were justified as a matter of law by special non-law-enforcement needs. It reasoned that the interest in curtailing pregnancy complications and reducing the medical costs associated with maternal cocaine use outweighed what it characterized as a "minimal intrusion" on the women's privacy. The Supreme Court then agreed to hear the case.

== Majority opinion ==
MUSC is a state-operated hospital, so its employees are government actors subject to the Fourth Amendment. And a drug screen is a "search" covered by the Fourth Amendment. Because the Fourth Circuit had ruled only on the special needs claim, the Court assumed that the women had not consented to the drug screens. It then concluded that the special needs doctrine did not permit MUSC to conduct the drug screens according to its policy.

The fact that the women neither knew of nor consented to the drug screens made this case different from the other cases in which the Court had applied the special needs doctrine. In Skinner v. Railway Labor Executives Association, National Treasury Employees Union v. Von Raab, and Vernonia School District 47J v. Acton, the Court had sustained drug testing under the special needs doctrine in light of the subjects' consent; in Chandler v. Miller, the Court had struck down drug testing under the special needs doctrine despite the subjects' consent. In all four of those cases, the fact that the subjects consented lessened the invasion on the subjects' privacy.

In this case, by contrast, the extent of the invasion on the women's privacy was far greater. "The reasonable expectation of privacy enjoyed by the typical patient undergoing diagnostic tests in a hospital is that the results of those tests will not be shared with nonmedical personnel without her consent." By turning over the results of these medical tests to the police without the women's consent, MUSC violated this reasonable expectation of privacy. In this case, unless the special needs doctrine applied, this intrusion upon the women's expectation of privacy would amount to a violation of the Fourth Amendment.

The Court did not simply take the city and the hospital at their word that their motivations were beneficent; rather, the Court examined all the evidence available to determine whether the special needs advanced were divorced from the generalized interest in law enforcement. For example, in Railway Executives, the need to discover the cause of railway accidents justified the drug testing, and in Acton it was the need to promote a drug-free school environment. In this case, however, the very reason for the policy was to use the threat of arrest to motivate the women to abstain from using cocaine. This fact was evident from the fact that police and prosecutors assisted the hospital staff in developing specimen collection and chain-of-custody procedures, the nature of possible criminal charges to which the patients would be subject, and how the police would be notified and the arrests would be accomplished. "While the ultimate goal of the program may well have been to get the women in question into substance abuse treatment and off of drugs, the immediate objective of the searches was to generate evidence for law enforcement purposes in order to reach that goal." Because the MUSC plan used the threat of arrest as the means to accomplish its overall goal of inducing pregnant women to abstain from using cocaine, "this case simply does not fit within the closely guarded category of 'special needs.'" The mere fact that the hospital may have had benevolent motives cannot justify departing from the protections of the Fourth Amendment, especially in light of the heavy involvement of law enforcement with the hospital's program.

Associate Justice Anthony Kennedy pointed out that all searches, by definition, would uncover evidence of crime, and this says nothing about the "special needs" the search might serve. In this case, however, Kennedy agreed that "while the policy may well have served legitimate needs unrelated to law enforcement, it had as well a penal character with a far greater connection to law enforcement than other searches sustained under our special needs rationale."

== Dissenting opinion ==
Associate Justice Antonin Scalia reasoned that there was no "search" in this case because the hospital did not take the urine from the women without their consent. Urine, a waste product, would ordinarily be abandoned by the person who produces it; anyone who came across it would be free to do with it what they will, just as with garbage found on the sidewalk. There is no "search" in the case of garbage left on the sidewalk because its (former) owner no longer expresses any interest in keeping it private. For a similar reason, there is no "search" involved in performing a urine screen because the women voluntarily provided it to the hospital—and even if they had not, the women would have freely abandoned it anyway.

Scalia also reasoned that even if the women had been coerced into providing the urine samples, it was not the government that coerced them. This was so, Scalia reasoned, even if these women had to provide the samples as a precondition of receiving their prenatal medical care.

== See also ==
- List of United States Supreme Court cases, volume 532
- List of United States Supreme Court cases
