= Schmuck v. United States =

- Supreme Court of the United States

Argued November 30, 1988 Decided March 22, 1989
- Full case name: Wayne T. Schmuck v. United States
- Docket no.: 87-6431
- Citations: 489 U.S. 705 (more) 109 S. Ct. 1443; 103 L. Ed. 2d 734
- Argument: Oral argument
- Opinion announcement: Opinion announcement

Case history
- Prior: Defendant convicted (W.D.Wisc., 1983), rev'd and rem'd, (776 F.2d 1368 (7th Cir., 1985), rev'd en banc 804 F.2d 384 (7th Cir., 1988), certiorari granted, 486 U.S. 1004

Holding
- Defendant was properly convicted of mail fraud since third-party mailings of vehicle title applications using fraudulent odometer readings were necessary to success of ongoing scheme; defendant was properly denied jury instruction allowing conviction on lesser included offense of odometer tampering since elements of that offense were not a subset of mail fraud. Seventh Circuit affirmed.

Court membership
- Chief Justice William Rehnquist Associate Justices William J. Brennan Jr. · Byron White; Thurgood Marshall · Harry Blackmun; John P. Stevens · Sandra Day O'Connor; Antonin Scalia · Anthony Kennedy

Case opinions
- Majority: Blackmun, joined by Rehnquist, White, Stevens, Kennedy
- Dissent: Scalia, joined by Brennan, Marshall, O'Connor

Laws applied
- 18 U.S.C. § 1341, F.R.Crim.P. 31(c)

Schmuck v. United States, 489 U.S. 705 (1989), is a United States Supreme Court decision on criminal law and procedure. By a 5–4 margin it upheld the mail fraud conviction of an Illinois man and resolved a conflict among the appellate circuits over which test to use to determine if a defendant was entitled to a jury instruction allowing conviction on a lesser included charge. Justice Harry Blackmun wrote for the majority; Antonin Scalia for the dissent.

The case had begun when Wayne Schmuck was prosecuted for having rolled back odometers for years on cars he sold to used-car dealers. He had been indicted for 12 counts of mail fraud, based on the vehicle title applications the dealers had then mailed to the state's Department of Transportation in order to resell the cars. Before his trial in the Western District of Wisconsin, he had been denied a motion to have the jury instructed that they could vote to convict him of tampering with the odometer, at the time a less serious offense, if they did not find him guilty of mail fraud.

He raised the issue after his conviction with the Seventh Circuit Court of Appeals, as well as the applicability of the mail-fraud statute to the dealers' applications. A panel rejected the latter argument but agreed that the jury should have been allowed to consider the lesser charge, reversing the conviction and remanding the case for a new trial. The government appealed that decision to an en banc panel of the circuit, which restored the conviction, holding that the odometer tampering was not "inherently related" to the mail fraud. Since other appellate circuits had preferred a different test for lesser included charges, Schmuck successfully petitioned the Supreme Court to hear the case.

Blackmun ruled for the government on both questions. Since Schmuck had enjoyed a continuing relationship with the dealers he sold to, and the cars could not be resold to a retail customer without titles obtained using false information, the dealers' applications were an essential element of his crime and thus constituted mail fraud. On the second question, Blackmun said the court should have considered whether the elements of odometer tampering were a subset of the elements of the mail fraud, and since that was not the case Schmuck had been properly denied the instruction. Scalia's dissent focused exclusively on the mail fraud issue. Since Schmuck had already received his payment for the altered vehicles, it did not matter what happened afterwards, a holding he found more consistent with the Court's earlier rulings on the subject.

== Underlying prosecution ==
For 15 years, Wayne Schmuck of Harvard, Illinois, owner of Big Foot Auto Sales, had sold used cars he had bought in his state, where vehicle titles did not then require a statement on the title of the odometer reading at the time of the transaction, to dealers in Wisconsin, which did. Unbeknownst to the dealers, he had in some cases hired someone to roll back the odometers on them, making the vehicles appear to have less mileage than they actually did. Thus they commanded an artificially higher price, both when the dealer paid Schmuck and when they sold it to a customer. In order for the retail transaction to take place, the dealers needed to mail a title application, including the falsified odometer reading, to the state Department of Transportation.

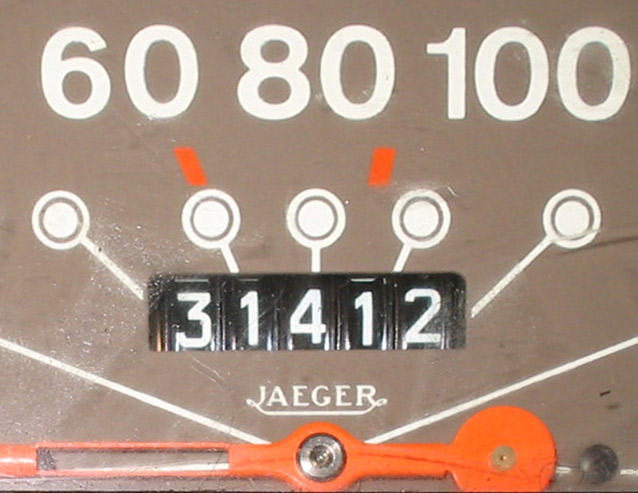
A mechanical odometer similar to the ones Schmuck had rolled back

Around 1981 his scheme was discovered when suspicious regulators wrote to the vehicles' previous owners, whose addresses were on the dealer's applications, and learned what the odometers had said at the time of sale. He was arrested by federal authorities and indicted on 12 counts of mail fraud, a felony, for cars he had sold to five different dealers, some as many as five times over a two-year period. At his trial, presided over by district judge Barbara Brandriff Crabb, he admitted that he had rolled back the odometers, but denied that he had committed mail fraud since the dealers had sent the applications after they had bought the cars from him, therefore it wasn't necessary that they do so for him to have realized the proceeds of the odometer tampering. Before his trial in United States District Court for the Western District of Wisconsin, his attorney, Peter Lewis Steinberg, moved that the jury be instructed that they could convict Schmuck on the lesser included charge of odometer tampering, at the time a misdemeanor, if they did not feel his actions constituted mail fraud.

It was denied, and the jury convicted Schmuck on all 12 counts. In late 1983 he was sentenced to 90 days in jail and four years of probation. His lawyers appealed the conviction to the Seventh Circuit Court of Appeals.

== Legal background ==
On appeal, Steinberg again raised the jury-instruction issue. He also challenged the conviction itself as an unreasonable, overbroad application of the statute, and called it a violation of due process since Schmuck could not have had control over the actions of his victims. Both arguments relied on unresolved issues of case law.

=== Scope of mail-fraud statute ===
Under the relevant federal statute, it is not necessary to prove that the accused personally made the mailing at issue. The law applies to one who "causes to be deposited any matter or thing whatever to be sent or delivered by any private or commercial interstate carrier" or "knowingly causes to be delivered by mail or such carrier according to the direction thereon" as much as to a perpetrator who makes the mailing themselves. The extent to which a mailing may be considered part of a fraudulent scheme has been the subject of many appeals cases.

The most important precedent in the case was recent. Three years earlier, in United States v. Galloway, a panel of the Seventh Circuit had sustained a mail-fraud conviction in United States v. Galloway, another case involving odometer tampering. Crabb had also presided over that case's trial, and had directed a not-guilty verdict after the jury convicted.

The government appealed, and by a 2–1 margin the jury's verdict was restored. Robert Arthur Sprecher, following United States v. Shryock, an earlier case from the Fifth Circuit where the defendant had been the head of the leasing department at a new-car dealership, held that the ongoing nature of the scheme distinguished the case and supported the jury verdict. But concurring Judge Richard Dickson Cudahy, calling the statute "judicially hypertrophied" warned that "the present case takes us to what (for now) may be the outer limits". Luther Merritt Swygert dissented. "The mailings did not conceal the fraud, produce profit for Galloway or contribute to the consumer's harm," he wrote. "The mailings resulted from a transaction to which Galloway was not a party and they were routine business mailings the purposes of which were immaterial to Galloway." He distinguished that case from Shryock by noting that Shryock had been a retail dealer, selling directly to consumers, instead of a wholesaler.

Both Galloway and Shryock had departed from a line of Supreme Court cases in which inevitable mailings by other parties that took place after the perpetrators of the fraud had made their money had been held not to constitute mail fraud. However, other cases had established that mail fraud had occurred even where the perpetrators had not explicitly intended use of the mails as part of their scheme, was merely incident to it or if the mailing took place after the money had been collected but as part of an ongoing scheme involving a continuing relationship with the victims.

All of those cases had been narrowly decided. In his dissent in Kann v. United States, one of the former, where the mail-fraud charge arose from a check sent to a bank by the perpetrators, William O. Douglas argued that even though the deception was complete the perpetrators still needed the check to clear the bank for their scheme to be finalized. "[I]t is plain that these plans had a wider reach and that but for the use of the mails they would not have been finally consummated," he concluded. The Fifth Circuit used similar logic in Shryock, as did the Seventh in Galloway.

=== Lesser included offense ===
Federal Rule of Criminal Procedure 31(c) says that a lesser included offense must be "necessarily included" in the greater offense. What that means was and how thus to determine if a defendant was entitled to an instruction allowing the jury to consider it was, at the time, unsettled. Courts had traditionally used the elements test, by which a lesser charge was available only if all its elements were part of the greater offense. The test was purely theoretical, based on how both offenses were described in the statutes without regard to the actual circumstances.

In 1971, Judge Malcolm Richard Wilkey of the District of Columbia Circuit articulated some issues with Rule 31(c)'s wording:

"Necessarily included" as of what time? By a comparison of what? The indictment with another indictment (necessarily a theoretical indictment and charge, because the lesser included offense question only arises when no charge of it has been drafted)? The proved elements of each offense actually adduced at trial?

He proposed instead that courts consider the actual facts of the case, to see if an inherent relationship existed between the charged offense and the proposed lesser offense. He called this "[a] more natural, realistic and sound interpretation" of Rule 31(c). At the time of Schmuck's appeal, two circuits had elected to stay with the traditional elements test, while others, including the Seventh, were using Wilkey's inherent-relationship test.

== Appeals ==
The Seventh Circuit heard the case twice. A three-judge panel reversed the conviction and ordered a new trial, but then the circuit en banc reinstated it.

=== Panel ===
Swgyert, Joel Flaum, Thomas E. Fairchild heard oral argument in the case in September 1984. They returned over a year later with a 2-1 decision reversing the conviction and remanding the case to district court for a new trial.

Swygert wrote for himself and Flaum. He rejected Schmuck's attack on the conviction, citing the circuit's recent holding in Galloway(a decision from which he himself had dissented) and declining to overrule it. As for the alleged due-process violation, he continued, "[o]ne answer is that he can prevent the mailing by abstaining from the fraud." Galloway and the cases on which it rested had also found no due-process violation.

However, applying the inherent-relationship test, which the circuit had adopted earlier that year, he found that Schmuck was indeed entitled to a jury instruction allowing them to convict on odometer tampering:

We hold that there is an inherent relationship between mail fraud and the "fraud" that underlies the mail fraud offense. Both offenses protect against the same kind of societal wrong: fraud. And it can generally be expected that proof of mail fraud will entail proof of a completed underlying "fraud," although this is certainly not always true.

In this specific case, a rational trier of fact such as the jurors could have decided the question of whether Schmuck's scheme constituted mail fraud either way, as indeed Galloway suggested, but that was for the jury to decide.

Fairchild concurred with the majority's upholding of the conviction's rationality but disagreed that the odometer-tampering instruction was necessary. Not only was there no correspondence between the statutory elements of the two crimes, he found no inherent relationship between them either. The facts in all the precedents the majority relied on, even Whitaker, " demonstrate a much closer relationship between the offense not charged but proved in the course of trial and the offense charged than can be discerned between odometer alteration and mail fraud," he wrote. "There is apparently no case holding that fraudulent conduct which happens to constitute a federal offense and is proved in establishing the elements of mail fraud is included within mail fraud."

=== En banc ===
The government appealed the ruling, asking for an en banc rehearing before the entire Seventh Circuit. After hearing arguments in mid-1986, a decision was handed down early in 1988. By a 9–2 margin, the panel was reversed and Schmuck's conviction affirmed. The circuit also decided to reverse itself on the adoption of the Whitaker inherent-relationship test.

==== Majority ====
Fairchild wrote for the majority. Not only did he reiterate and clarify his earlier opinion to say that "[g]iven the present indictment, ... alleging as one element devising a scheme to defraud purchasers of automobiles with altered odometers, knowingly and willfully causing an odometer to be altered is not identical to the element of having devised the scheme", he made an extended critique of the inherent-relationship test. "Neither the court in Whitaker nor any decision adopting its analysis has addressed how the language of the Rule gives rise to the inherent relationship test.

That test, Fairchild wrote, required that the court dispense with the mutuality provision under which a request for a lesser included charge can be granted only if the other side would also be able to make the same request. A defense could request a lesser-charge instruction later in the trial as the facts became clearer, yet a prosecution making the same motion could well fail on the grounds that the defendant had not received sufficient prior notice such as is usually given in the indictment. Yet, the judge observed, there was no language in Rule 31(c) that would support such different treatment.

Further, Fairchild argued, the test was less likely to lead to "certainty and predictability" in the application of the rule. "Finding an inherent relationship requires a determination that the offenses relate to the same interests and that 'in general' proof of the lesser 'necessarily' involves proof of the greater," he wrote, quoting from Whitaker. "These new layers of analysis add to the uncertainty of the propriety of an instruction in a particular case: not only are there more issues to be resolved, but correct resolution involves questions of degree and judgment, with the attendant probability that the trial and appellate courts may differ."

Other problems Fairchild identified included the potential for abuse by defendants seeking late in the trial to appeal to the jury's mercy, a problem he noted that Whitaker had also recognized. Lastly, the concept of a lesser included charge was key in resolving some questions of double jeopardy and unlawful cumulative punishment. Precedent suggested that those cases stuck with the elements test, and "[i]t seems desirable that, as nearly as possible, the terminology should have the same meaning in both contexts," he concluded. "Using the elements test for Rule 31(c) problems at least approaches keeping the same meaning."

==== Dissent ====
While Swygert had changed his mind and voted with the majority, Flaum was joined by Cudahy in holding fast to Whitaker and its test. "To confine the determination of whether to give an instruction to an analysis of statutes is to impose an artificial restraint on the instruction formulation process," he said. Had that test been the one applied in United States v. Cova, the case where the circuit had adopted the inherent-relationship test, in which conspiracy to possess cocaine was held to be a proper lesser charge to conspiracy to distribute cocaine, "the government would have lost a case that it had proved for a reason that had nothing to do with the case itself."

"The need for a complete method of determining what lesser offenses are included within a charged offense is particularly great where, as here, the statute at issue is one that can be violated in a number of ways," Flaum wrote. "Indeed, the past several years have seen the enactment of a number of criminal statutes that can be violated in various ways, and that in fact are specifically predicated on violations of any number of other legal provisions" such as the Racketeer Influenced and Corrupt Organizations Act (RICO). "They are exactly the type of offenses for which consideration of lesser offenses is appropriate under Rule 31(c), but it is hard to imagine how any lesser included offense could ever be considered under the elements test, precisely because these 'greater' offenses are so broadly defined." The Tenth Circuit, he reminded his colleagues, had found both tests valid and held that their use should depend on the circumstances.

Flaum scoffed at the majority's insistence on the mutuality provision, which Wilkey had seen as inimical to the fair administration of justice:

In an ideal world, where all lawyers would be omniscient, both sides would be able to request instructions on lesser offenses based on the full trial record, which would have been anticipated before trial by omniscient defense counsel. In the real world, however, fairness requires that the prosecution be allowed to request only instructions that could fairly have been expected prior to trial. Defendants should be allowed to request instructions based on all the information available to them at the time of the request, including the trial record, thereby waiving any claim that they were not on notice. It may be, as the Whitaker court concluded, that this distinction gives no unfair advantage to defendants over prosecutors because prosecutors, who bear the burden of proof, will be able to assess the likely state of the record in advance and make their charging decisions accordingly.

Applying the inherent-relationship test to Schmuck's case, Flaum found that the odometer tampering was indeed a lesser charge to the mail fraud. "[T]he mailings that were the subject of the charges against the defendant were not separate from the fraudulent acts of which he was accused, but followed those acts both logically and chronologically," he wrote. "As the government proved this case, it had to prove odometer tampering because tampering led to sale, which led to mailing."

Flaum pointed to Schmuck's motion for a directed verdict after the prosecution finished its case. One of the defendant's arguments had been that the mailings were not only not necessary to the fraud, they were actually counterproductive to his scheme because they increased the chance that his crime would be discovered. The district judge had denied it as properly a question for the jury to decide, a decision Flaum called correct. But that denial, he continued, was exactly why the jury needed to be able to consider odometer tampering as a lesser included charge. "Because this rational possibility existed based on the record assembled at trial, the defendant was entitled to a lesser instruction on odometer tampering."

== Before the Court ==
This time the defense appealed. Schmuck petitioned the Supreme Court for certiorari; it was granted a few months later so the Court could resolve the conflict between the circuits over the test for lesser included offenses. Oral arguments were heard in November.

=== Oral argument ===
Steinberg appeared for Schmuck, as he had since trial. Brian Martin appeared for the government, assisted on his brief by the Solicitor General's office.

==== Schmuck ====
Steinberg began by reminding the justices of the tenuous nature of Galloway, the precedent for the conviction, accepted only because of the previous judicial extension of the statute. When they had held the previous year in McNally v. United States that the mail-fraud statute only applied to schemes to acquire money or property and not what was later codified as honest services fraud, they had reiterated an old principle "that where you're faced with two possible interpretations, you should choose the less harsh one and also that you shouldn't create constructive crimes". Only one crime, odometer tampering, corresponded exactly with what Schmuck had done.

He was interrupted by Justice Anthony Kennedy, who wanted him to address the government's argument that the ongoing nature of the fraud made the odometer readings on the title applications essential to the scheme. "It seems to me that if in a single instance the mailing of the title documents doesn't suffice to make it mail fraud, the multiplication of the instances doesn't change anything," Steinberg responded. "The repetition of odometer tampering doesn't create a mail fraud."

Antonin Scalia followed up by asking if the dealers were lulled by Schmuck regularly passing good title. "[T]hat's been the point I think at which the government's case breaks down," Steinberg told him. "There's nothing about title registration which reassures you the odometer hasn't been tampered with." When Scalia pressed the lawyer on whether Schmuck would be culpable if he had had to mail the applications himself, Steinberg stood firm. The success of the title applications, he maintained, did not depend on the odometer readings, although Schmuck might have been committing mail fraud if he had mailed the original odometer slips himself. Scalia said he was contradicting his earlier argument that the mail was utterly irrelevant to the scheme, to which Steinberg said "[Y]ou have to be able to point out how the mailing contributed to the success of the scheme."

For the latter half of his argument, he addressed the lesser-included issue. At trial, the jury had deliberated for three hours. Since Schmuck had admitted to the odometer tampering, "the only thing the jury could have been out considering was is this really mail fraud. Are these mailings really sufficiently closely related to what my client was trying to do to be mail fraud?" he posited them asking themselves. "I think it's clear from that record that a lesser instruction on odometer tampering had at least an arguable chance of success." The justices asked no questions, and Steinberg asked to reserve his remaining time for rebuttal.

==== United States ====
Martin began by reiterating the government's main argument: that the scheme had been continuing, that dealers were able to resell the cars with altered odometers and went back to Schmuck for more and thus the title applications furthered his scheme. Justice Sandra Day O'Connor asked if the government had any evidence to support that claim; when Martin restated his argument another justice indicated he had a problem with that as well. "[T]he evidence would support a finding here that the existence of title laws which he could circumvent, figure out a way to get around, actually had a lulling effect," he claimed.

"[T]he primary benefit in this case was that ... was that the mailings were necessary to effect the transaction", Martin asserted. "And that's all that the mail fraud statute requires is that the mailing be incident to an essential part of the scheme or step in the plot of the scheme. And the sale could not be made without the title papers being sent to the Department of Transportation." This, he argued, distinguished the case from Kann and the Court's other holdings in this area of law.

As for the elements test, Martin said it was plain from the language of the rule. "One offense is not necessarily included in another simply because in one case defendant happens to commit both." The history of the rule further supported the use of the elements test, he added. Asked why the inherent-relationship test was harder to apply in a situation where the facts of the indictment would have clearly supported the lesser charge, he insisted that on balance that test was still harder to apply. "Lastly," he concluded, "we think that the elements test respects the role of the government and the grand jury as the charging instrument in criminal matters."

==== Rebuttal ====
On rebuttal, Steinberg returned to another point he had been trying to make: that the title-application mailings were actually potentially counterproductive to Schmuck's scheme, since they increased the chance that his odometer alteration would be discovered. This had been part of the Court's holding in United States v. Maze, where invoices that reflected the use of a stolen credit card were found not to constitute mail fraud since they increased the likelihood of detection. In Schmuck's case, the address of the person who sold him the cars was included on those applications, which eventually led investigators to talk to those sellers and uncovered the scheme. "[T]his brings up my point about the relationship between the requirements that automobile titles be registered and the purpose of that registration", Steinberg said. "The purpose is precisely to make it tough on people like my client."

He contended that the failure to even allow himself and his partner to argue before the jury for a lesser charge left them prejudiced against his client. "I mention in my brief the comment that the government's attorney made in his rebuttal argument about how if you do any type of crime, you should pay for it. It was [a] clear invitation to say, well, he's certainly guilty of something, and we can't let him go."

Noting that since the trial, Congress had made odometer tampering a felony, he implored the justices to stand firm. "This is really odometer tampering. Don't let the government get away with overcharging ... It takes more than the proof of a fraudulent scheme plus some connected mailing to make a case mail fraud."

== Decision ==
In March 1989 the Court handed down its ruling. By a narrow margin, it held for the government on both questions, that the title applications were mailings in furtherance of Schmuck's scheme and that he was not entitled to an instruction on odometer tampering. Harry Blackmun wrote the majority opinion, joined by Chief Justice William Rehnquist, Byron White, John Paul Stevens, and Anthony Kennedy. Scalia wrote for himself and the other three dissenters, William Brennan, Thurgood Marshall, and Sandra Day O'Connor. His opinion exclusively concerned the first question and did not reach the second.

=== Majority opinion ===
Following the prosecution's arguments, Blackmun distinguished the case from Kann, Maze and the earlier precedents. "Schmuck's was not a 'one-shot' operation in which he sold a single car to an isolated dealer. His was an ongoing fraudulent venture," he wrote. "A rational jury could have concluded that the success of Schmuck's venture depended upon his continued harmonious relations with, and good reputation among, retail dealers."

Blackmun also rejected Schmuck's argument from Maze that the mailings' potential to expose the scheme ruled them out as contributory elements of it. "The mail fraud statute includes no guarantee that the use of the mails for the purpose of executing a fraudulent scheme will be risk-free. Those who use the mails to defraud proceed at their peril."

Turning to the lesser included charge, Blackmun again accepted the prosecution's reading of Rule 31(c). "The Rule speaks in terms of an offense that is 'necessarily included in the offense charged.' This language suggests that the comparison to be drawn is between offenses," he wrote. "Since offenses are statutorily defined, that comparison is appropriately conducted by reference to the statutory elements of the offenses in question." He further agreed that the inherent-relationship test was inconsistent with that language, and that mutuality was not something that could be discarded so casually since it would violate the long-held constitutional and common law principle that a defendant not be required to answer any charges not in the indictment."

Martin's argument that the history of the rule favored the elements test also met with Blackmun's agreement. In addition to the examples of use prior to its adoption that Martin had mentioned, Blackmun found that the Court itself had used it back in 1896. Lastly he agreed that it could not produce certain, uniform results, pointing to the case before the Court as an example. "The three judges of the original appellate panel split in their application of the inherent relationship test to the offenses of mail fraud and odometer tampering," Blackmun wrote. "In the context of rules of criminal procedure, where certainty and predictability are desired, we prefer the clearer standard for applying Rule 31(c)."

Having established that the elements test was the one to use, Blackmun applied it to Schmuck's case. "The offense of odometer tampering includes the element of knowingly and willfully causing an odometer to be altered. This element is not a subset of any element of mail fraud," he wrote. "Knowingly and willfully tampering with an odometer is not identical to devising or intending to devise a fraudulent scheme." Therefore, the Seventh Circuit had decided the case correctly.

=== Dissent ===
"The law does not establish a general federal remedy against fraudulent conduct, with use of the mails as the jurisdictional hook, but reaches only 'those limited instances in which the use of the mails is a part of the execution of the fraud, leaving all other cases to be dealt with by appropriate state law,'" Scalia began, quoting from Kann. "In other words, it is mail fraud, not mail and fraud, that incurs liability.".

He saw no distinction between the previous cases and the instant one, since the mailings occurred after Schmuck had been paid by the dealers. He was skeptical of the majority's argument that Schmuck depended on the dealer's ongoing trust. He pointed in particular to another of the precedent cases, Parr v. United States, in which property-tax bills and credit-card payments mailed by others were necessary for the scheme but held to not support a conviction. "All the more reason to adhere as closely as possible to past cases," he concluded. "I think we have not done that today, and thus create problems for tomorrow."

== Subsequent jurisprudence ==
While the Supreme Court has not had to revisit the scope of mail fraud, lower courts have used Schmuck to guide them on the question. In two cases heard by the Fifth Circuit, a distinction, sufficient to not be covered by the law, was found.

In a later case, Carter v. United States, the Supreme Court relied on Schmuck when it applied the elements test in considering a lesser-included charge; other courts have cited the case to support similar applications.

=== Mail fraud ===
In a 1996 case the Ninth Circuit was faced with a very similar scheme. Like Schmuck, the defendants had bought used vehicles, formerly rental cars, from California and Texas, and rolled back the odometers before selling them to an Arizona taxi service. To conceal the tampering, they applied for duplicate titles from those two states, and filled in the altered mileage.

They avoided using the Postal Service in their communications with sellers and buyers, relying on alternatives like Federal Express and fax. Nevertheless, the government alleged that the mailing of a title certificate to the cab company by Arizona's Department of Transportation was equivalent to the title-application mailing in Schmuck, and the defendants were convicted. On appeal, Judge Stephen S. Trott found no distinction, calling the mailing of the title certificates "analogous" to the applications.

Other types of third-party mailings—among them stock-purchase confirmation slips, annual reports and proxy statements—have also been found to be part of ongoing fraudulent schemes and thus supporting mail fraud convictions. Months after Schmuck, the Seventh Circuit relied on it in overturning a district court's acquittal of the mail fraud charges of two Chicago men accused of an insurance-fraud scheme, holding that correspondence between their lawyer and the insurance company over settling the claim was part of their scheme. Flaum followed the Supreme Court in rejecting the counterproductivity argument. In a civil suit under RICO, Schmuck was read to allow the plaintiff telephone company to argue that the bills it sent customers allegedly bilked by the defendant premium texting provider constituted mail fraud.

In two other cases, Schmuck's "ongoing fraudulent scheme" standard supported convictions. Invoices from a caseworker's employer to a state public housing authority based on her falsified activity reports were found by a district court to be a necessary part of such a scheme since they displaced the loss from the employer. The Third Circuit relied on Schmuck to determine that a scheme to embezzle fuel tax payments by using a long series of wire transfers not only supported the fraud conviction but, by extension, one for money laundering.

In a Colorado case, a distinction argued by defendants resulted in the judge relying on a more expansive reading of Schmuck to deny their motion to dismiss the indictment. The government had alleged that, as part of a mortgage fraud scheme, the deeds and deeds of trust mailed to the lenders by the county recorder's office constituted mail fraud. The defendants countered that, under Colorado law, deeds took effect once they were executed, so the mailing of the documents was not necessary to their scheme.

"Defendants' argument is persuasive, to a point", wrote Lewis Babcock, then chief judge for the District of Colorado. While they were right that legal ownership of the homes in Colorado was, unlike the cars in Wisconsin, transferred before the mailing of the document, he still found that those mailings served the "theories of lulling and concealment" that he saw as implied by Schmuck. However, he dismissed charges arising from the mailings of those documents to the actual buyers, since they were not the intended victims of the scheme and thus the mailings did not further it.

==== Evans and Strong ====
In 1998, the Fifth Circuit heard United States v. Evans, an appeal of a parole officer's conviction on mail-fraud charges stemming from falsified travel vouchers she filed to conceal a relationship and bribery scheme with a parolee. The government's theory was that the vouchers' mailing to state archives in Austin after her supervisor had approved them was an essential part of the scheme.

A divided panel overturned the convictions. Judge Harold R. DeMoss, Jr., primarily relied on Kann, Parr and Maze in finding that the mailings occurred after Evans' scheme had come to fruition (when she submitted the vouchers to her supervisor) and were not essential to them. In a footnote, he distinguished the case from Schmuck with the observation that Evans had no long-term relationship to maintain with the employees who kept the records.

But Thomas Morrow Reavley, in dissent, found the case to have much more similarity to Schmuck than the others. The vouchers were not mailed to Austin merely for archival purposes, he noted, but because her checks for reimbursement were cut there and sent to her directly. Further, she did have an ongoing relationship to maintain through the falsified documents. "As in Schmuck, Evans' ongoing fraudulent scheme depended on continued harmonious relations with her employer," he wrote. "Failure to submit routine travel vouchers consistent with Clay's parole file put at risk her relationship of trust and goodwill with her employer."

In United States v. Strong, involving another complicated used-car scheme called "punching titles", the Fifth Circuit unanimously found another significant distinction from Schmuck. The defendants, two brothers, would buy cars at auto auctions using buyer's drafts, which allowed them to take immediate possession. While the auction house was waiting for the draft to clear, they would apply to a branch office of the Texas Department of Transportation (TDOT) for a certified copy (CCO) of the original, which they could get on the spot, using forged documents to "authenticate" themselves as the owner. Then they sold the car to another buyer using the copy, making it difficult to recover once the auctioneer came to try and retrieve it once the draft came back unpaid.

The brothers were charged with eight counts of mail fraud, since TDOT mailed copies of the CCO applications to the agency's headquarters in Austin. One pleaded guilty and the other opted for trial. After the jury convicted him, he successfully moved for a directed verdict of not guilty. The government appealed.

Judge E. Grady Jolly noted that while Schmuck had reached a different result than Kann, Parr and Maze about the utility of the mailings to the scheme, it had not overruled those cases. While Strong was right that, unlike Schmuck, clear title never passed to the buyers of the fraudulently obtained cars, neither were the TDOT mailings as distant from the scheme as they had found to be in the other cases. "As a result, this case falls in the interstices," Jolly observed.

Prosecutors argued that the mailings lent authenticity to the fraud, lulled buyers into complacency and might have helped conceal the fraud from someone checking the records in Austin. Jolly wrote that no evidence had been introduced to support the first two arguments, and as to the second, he considered their counterproductivity significant. "The mailings, by introducing a secondary chain of title into state records, are more likely to alert an investigator to the fraud than to somehow delay its detection ... [I]t is counterintuitive to conclude that a defendant who knew enough about TDOT procedures to envision an inter-office mailing as part of his fraud would not realize the fraud-revealing implication of such a mailing on title records."

=== Carter v. United States ===
In 2000, the Court heard Carter v. United States, on appeal from an unpublished decision of the Third Circuit. The petitioner, convicted of bank robbery, had, like Schmuck, been denied a jury instruction on a lesser included offense at trial. Since he had not used force once in the bank, he argued that the jury should have been allowed to consider convicting him of bank larceny instead. By another 5–4 vote, the conviction was affirmed.

Justice Clarence Thomas wrote for the majority. He undertook a lengthy comparison of the elements of the two offenses, separately codified, and concluded that differences in the wording were significant enough that bank larceny could not be a lesser included charge to bank robbery. In dissent, Ruth Bader Ginsburg criticized Thomas's opinion as a "woodenly literal construction" of the statutes that ignored the underlying common law and gave prosecutors too much power at the expense of juries.

== Analysis and commentary ==
Most discussion of Schmuck has focused on its expansive reading of the "in furtherance" provision of the statute. Ellen Podgor, a professor at Georgia State, wrote in 1994 for the National Association of Criminal Defense Lawyers that it would appear that the decision left previous limitations to the statute, particularly from Maze, Kann and Parr, "questionable." But although the majority had eliminated counterproductivity as a potential defense, some appeals courts had continued to accept it.

Shortly after the decision, Creighton law student Matthew J. Effken wrote something similar in that institution's law review. The Court, he observed, was faced with inconsistent and conflicting precedents in its prior mail-fraud cases, and sought to reconcile them in Schmuck. By using "highly selective quotations" from those cases, he argued, the Court was able to narrow the limitations it had placed on them. Then, it distinguished the case from Kann, Parr and Maze by treating all Schmuck's acts as part of an ongoing scheme, rather than single, discrete acts. Then, it deferred to the jury in making that finding. "The overall effect should be that mail fraud cases will be won or lost at trial," he concluded. "Therefore, appeals which allege inadequate mailings should only be successful based upon a showing of an irrational result."

== Legacy ==
As Steinberg had noted at oral argument, during the pendency of the case Congress had made odometer tampering a felony. In 1985 Nebraska Senator James Exon introduced a bill that not only did that but required stronger reporting and disclosure; it was signed into law by President Ronald Reagan as the Truth in Mileage Act of 1986 just before that year's elections. It provides for civil and criminal penalties, including fines and prison terms of up to three years.

The case's name has been found to be unintentionally humorous, since "schmuck", from the Yiddish word for "penis", is also a common term of abuse in American English. SCOTUSblog reporter John Elwood has referred to a "Schmuck v. United States Memorial Worst-Case-Caption Award" he supposedly gives each term. In a short 1993 Yale Law Journal article on the increasing use of Yiddish loanwords in American legal opinions, chief judge of the Ninth Circuit Alex Kozinski and UCLA law professor Eugene Volokh noted that the fact that some people actually are named Schmuck made it hard to tell much about the history of the word's use in opinions. "We can't report on the degree to which schmuck has worked its way into legal English, which is too bad, because schmucks are even more common in courtrooms than schlemiels, schmoozing, and chutzpah," they wrote. "We can, however, mention that there's a U.S. Supreme Court case named Schmuck v. United States; for what it's worth, the petitioner was a used-car dealer."

== See also ==
- List of United States Supreme Court cases, volume 489
- List of United States Supreme Court cases by the Rehnquist Court
