= Blanton v. City of North Las Vegas =

Blanton v. North Las Vegas
- Supreme Court of the United States

Argued January 9, 1989 Decided March 6, 1989
- Full case name: Blanton et al. v. City of North Las Vegas, Nevada
- Citations: 489 U.S. 538 (more) 109 S. Ct. 1289; 103 L. Ed. 2d 550

Case history
- Prior: 103 Nev. 623, 748 P.2d 494 (1987); cert. granted, 487 U.S. 1203 (1988).

Holding
- The right to a jury trial is not found in crimes where the maximum period of incarceration is under six months.

Court membership
- Chief Justice William Rehnquist Associate Justices William J. Brennan Jr. · Byron White; Thurgood Marshall · Harry Blackmun; John P. Stevens · Sandra Day O'Connor; Antonin Scalia · Anthony Kennedy

Case opinion
- Majority: Marshall, joined by unanimous

Laws applied
- U.S. Const. amend. VI

Blanton v. North Las Vegas, 489 U.S. 538 (1989), is a United States Supreme Court case clarifying the limitations of the right to trial by jury.

== Background ==
Melvin R. Blanton was charged with driving under the influence of alcohol. His petition for a jury trial was denied and he was instead given a bench trial. Blanton appealed, arguing that his Sixth Amendment right to trial by jury had been violated.

== Opinion of the Court ==
The Court ruled that Blanton did not have the right to a jury trial because the crime he was charged with was "petty" because it carries a maximum prison term of six months or less. The Court went on to elaborate: "we do find it appropriate to presume for purposes of the Sixth Amendment that society views such an offense as 'petty.' A defendant is entitled to a jury trial in such circumstances only if he can demonstrate that any additional statutory penalties, viewed in conjunction with the maximum authorized period of incarceration, are so severe that they clearly reflect a legislative determination that the offense in question is a 'serious' one."

== See also ==
- List of United States Supreme Court cases, volume 489
- List of United States Supreme Court cases
- Lists of United States Supreme Court cases by volume
- List of United States Supreme Court cases by the Rehnquist Court
