= Harris v. Reed =

- Supreme Court of the United States

Argued October 12, 1988 Decided February 22, 1989
- Full case name: Warren Lee Harris, Petitioner v. Marvin Reed, Warden, et al.
- Citations: 489 U.S. 255 (more) 109 S. Ct. 1038, 103 L.Ed.2d 308

Case history
- Prior: 822 F.2d 684 (CA7 1987)

Holding
- The "plain statement rule" of Michigan v. Long is not limited to cases on direct review in this Court, but extends as well to cases on federal habeas review.

Court membership
- Chief Justice William Rehnquist Associate Justices William J. Brennan Jr. · Byron White; Thurgood Marshall · Harry Blackmun; John P. Stevens · Sandra Day O'Connor; Antonin Scalia · Anthony Kennedy

Case opinions
- Majority: Blackmun, joined by Rehnquist, Brennan, White, Marshall, Stevens, O'Connor, Scalia
- Concurrence: Stevens
- Concurrence: O'Connor, joined by Rehnquist, Scalia
- Dissent: Kennedy

Harris v. Reed, 489 U.S. 255 (1989), is a 1989 United States Supreme Court case in which the court held that the plain statement rule of Michigan v. Long applies to federal habeas proceedings originating from state court judgments. This rule prohibits federal courts from reviewing questions of federal law in state court decisions if the state court opinion contains a "plain statement" that its decision is based on an "adequate and independent state ground".
