= Texas Monthly, Inc. v. Bullock =

- Supreme Court of the United States

Argued November 1, 1988 Decided February 21, 1989
- Full case name: Texas Monthly, Inc. v. Bullock, Comptroller of Public Accounts of State of Texas, et al.
- Citations: 489 U.S. 1 (more) 109 S. Ct. 890; 103 L. Ed. 2d 1; 1989 U.S. LEXIS 662

Holding
- A state violates the Establishment Clause and the Free Press Clause by exempting religious publications from paying taxes that all nonreligious publications must pay.

Court membership
- Chief Justice William Rehnquist Associate Justices William J. Brennan Jr. · Byron White; Thurgood Marshall · Harry Blackmun; John P. Stevens · Sandra Day O'Connor; Antonin Scalia · Anthony Kennedy

Case opinions
- Plurality: Brennan, joined by Marshall, Stevens
- Concurrence: White
- Concurrence: Blackmun, joined by O'Connor
- Dissent: Scalia, joined by Rehnquist, Kennedy

Laws applied
- U.S. Const. amend. I

Texas Monthly v. Bullock, 489 U.S. 1 (1989), was a case brought before the US Supreme Court in November 1988. The case (initiated by the publishers of Texas Monthly, a well-known general-interest magazine in Texas) was to test the legality of a Texas statute that exempted religious publications from paying state sales tax.

The Court, in a 6–3 decision lacking a majority, overturned an appellate court's decision that the exemption was constitutional and remanded the case.

== History ==
Prior to October 2, 1984, Texas exempted from sales tax "magazine subscriptions running half a year or longer and entered as second class mail." The exemption applied to any subscription regardless of its content.

Beginning on that date, it repealed the exemption (it would later reinstate it in its entirety from October 1, 1987). However, from 1984 to 1987, it maintained an exemption for "periodicals published or distributed by a religious faith consisting entirely of writings promulgating the teaching of the faith, along with books consisting solely of writings sacred to a religious faith."

The publishers of Texas Monthly, a popular and well-known general-interest magazine that did not qualify for the exemption, challenged the exemption by paying over $400,000 in sales taxes for 1985 under protest and filing suit in Travis County District Court to recover the taxes paid. It agreed by striking down the statute as a violation of both the Establishment Clause and the Free Press Clause and ordering the State of Texas to refund the taxes paid and interest.

However, the Third Texas Court of Appeals reversed in a 2-1 decision. It determined that the tax exemption met the tests required under Lemon v. Kurtzman (1971), and so did not violate the Establishment Clause. In addition, the Court of Appeals determined that the tax exemption did not violate the Free Press Clause, as only a few publications were qualified.

== Decision ==
=== Brennan's plurality opinion ===
Justice Brennan, Justice Marshall, and Justice Stevens based their plurality opinion in the Establishment Clause: "Congress shall make no law respecting an establishment of religion." As had been decided in earlier cases, Congress cannot establish a religion or even pass a law with the purpose of advancing religion in respect to non-religion.

The lack of a sales tax on religious literature was in effect a subsidy to the religious writers. If the religious writers did not pay a tax, then a secular writer would have to. That would in essence force tax payers, religious or not, to pay for a subsidy to religions. They held that had the statute been broader, including charities, for example, it would have been constitutional. Justice Brennan recognized the argument of Texas that taxing the publications may inhibit their ability to function to some extent thereby going against the Free Exercise Clause which states continuing from the above clause "or prohibiting the free exercise thereof." However, Justice Brennan argued that if all American people were required to pay the tax it did not unduly burden religion to pay the tax nor "prohibit" them from exercising as they wished.

=== White's concurring opinion ===
Justice White concurred in the judgment but argued that under the Court's prior precedent in Arkansas Writers' Project v. Ragland (1987), the Texas Law violated the Press Clause by taxing Texas Monthly but exempting other publishers solely on the basis of the religious content of their publications.

=== Blackmun's concurring opinion ===
Justice Blackmun concurred in the judgment and wrote an opinion, joined by Justice O'Connor, disagreeing with both the plurality and the dissenting opinions. He argued that the opinion does not recognize enough the Free Exercise Clause, and the dissent does not recognize the Establishment Clause. He argued that to understand the case, both clauses must be seen along with the Press Clause, which states "Congress shall make no law... abridging the freedom of speech."

When religious writings are given certain perks like a pass on sales tax, the freedom of speech of the other writers is inhibited because they have to pay sales tax. Free speech is not inhibited enough to be an issue and so one must decide where the line is between the Establishment Clause and the Free Exercise Clause. He argued that had the law been written to include other philosophical literature encouraging morality, it may have stood, but when it expressly focused on religion the Establishment Clause had been violated: "In this case, by confining the tax exemption exclusively to the sale of religious publications, Texas engaged in preferential support for the communication of religious messages."

=== Scalia's dissenting opinion ===
Justice Scalia wrote a dissenting opinion, joined by Chief Justice Rehnquist and Justice Kennedy, refuting the arguments of Justices Brennan and Blackmun. He extensively cited Walz v. Tax Commission of the City of New York (1970), where the Court found a New York law allowing religions and other non-profit organizations to not pay property tax. He argued that even though it included non-profit organizations, the Court had ruled specifically in favor of the exemptions for religions stating in Walz: "We find it unnecessary to justify the tax exemption of the social welfare services or 'good works' that some churches perform." He stated that though a tax exemption is similar economically to a subsidy, when discussing the Establishment Clause, they are different as found in Walz.

Also, a line must be drawn between the Establishment Clause and the Free Exercise Clause but sees more room between them. He argued that just because a law is not necessary for the Free Exercise Clause does not mean that it is unconstitutional on Establishment Clause grounds. He also notes that it passes all three prongs of the Lemon test by not overly entangling the church and state.

== See also ==
- List of United States Supreme Court cases, volume 489
- List of United States Supreme Court cases
- Lists of United States Supreme Court cases by volume
- List of United States Supreme Court cases by the Rehnquist Court
