= Carter v. United States (2000) =

2000 US Supreme Court case

- Supreme Court of the United States

Argued April 19, 2000 Decided June 12, 2000
- Full case name: Carter v. United States
- Citations: 530 U.S. 255 (more)

Court membership
- Chief Justice William Rehnquist Associate Justices John P. Stevens · Sandra Day O'Connor; Antonin Scalia · Anthony Kennedy; David Souter · Clarence Thomas; Ruth Bader Ginsburg · Stephen Breyer

Case opinions
- Majority: Thomas, joined by Rehnquist, O'Connor, Scalia, Kennedy
- Dissent: Ginsburg, joined by Stevens, Souter, Breyer

Carter v. United States, 530 U.S. 255 (2000), is a United States Supreme Court case in which the Court held, 5–4, that a defendant charged with robbery under 18 USC § 2113(a) was not entitled to a jury instruction to consider the lesser offense of larceny under 18 USC § 2113(b).

== Background ==
In 1997, Floyd J. Carter entered a bank unarmed, removed nearly $16,000, and fled the scene. In the process, Carter pushed one customer and startled others. Carter was charged with federal bank robbery under 18 USC § 2113(a), which punishes anyone who "by force and violence, or by intimidation, takes... any... thing of value [from a] bank." Carter pleaded not guilty on the grounds that he had not used any force, violence, or intimidation to deprive the bank of its money. Carter's defense asked the District Court to instruct the jury to consider whether Carter committed the lesser crime of federal bank larceny under 18 U.S.C. § 2113(b), which provides "[w]hoever takes and carries away, with intent to steal or purloin, any... thing of value exceeding $1,000 [from a]... bank." The District Court denied the motion and the jury returned a guilty verdict on the count of robbery. The Third Circuit Court of Appeals affirmed the judgment, and the Supreme Court granted certiorari.

== Opinion of the Court ==
Justice Thomas delivered the opinion for the majority. The majority applied Rule 31(c) of the Federal Rules of Criminal Procedure to require a defendant requesting a jury instruction of a lesser offense to prove that the elements of the lesser offense are a subset of the elements of the charged offense. The Court evaluated whether the elements of the crime of larceny under § 2113(b) were a subset of the elements of robbery under § 2113(a). The Court found several elements of larceny ("with intent to steal or purloin," "tak[e] and carr[y] away" and "value exceeding $1,000") that were not elements of robbery. The opinion relied on the legislative history of § 2113(a), which was revised in 1948 to delete the word 'feloniously'. The majority interpreted that deletion as the removal of the intent requirement, and found similar Congressional intent in the "take" and value elements under § 2133(b). Carter argued that Congress intended for § 2113(b) to be a lesser crime of § 2113(a) because § 2113(c) applied only whenever § 2113(b) was violated and the Court rejected this argument. The Court declined to apply a less rigid test to determine whether § 2113(b) was a lesser offense, citing its prior holding in Schmuck v. United States. The majority also rejected a common law interpretation of the statutes, holding that Congress had not appropriated common law terms in the statute but had instead defined the crimes expressly. Justice Ginsburg, with Stevens, Souter, and Breyer, dissented from the opinion. The dissent cited the common law influence on the statute in question as well as the preceding laws in its development as indication that Congress intended § 2133(b) to be a lesser offense.

== Impact ==
The Carter opinion showed that the Court was willing to abandon common law interpretation principles for some federal statutes or statutory provisions by asserting that "a 'cluster of ideas' from the common law should be imported into statutory text only when Congress employs a common-law term". This opinion was a further rejection of the idea that federal legislation is written with a "common law background." The decision can also be characterized as a more textualist approach to statutory interpretation.

== See also ==
- Schmuck v. United States, 489 U.S. 705 (1989)
