= National Treasury Employees Union v. Von Raab =

- Supreme Court of the United States

Argued November 2, 1988 Decided March 21, 1989
- Full case name: National Treasury Employees Union et al. v. Von Raab, Commissioner, United States Customs Service
- Citations: 489 U.S. 656 (more) 109 S. Ct. 1384; 103 L. Ed. 2d 685

Case history
- Prior: 816 F.2d 170 (5th Cir. 1987)

Holding
- The United States Customs Service's drug testing imposed on its employees does not violate the Fourth Amendment.

Court membership
- Chief Justice William Rehnquist Associate Justices William J. Brennan Jr. · Byron White; Thurgood Marshall · Harry Blackmun; John P. Stevens · Sandra Day O'Connor; Antonin Scalia · Anthony Kennedy

Case opinions
- Majority: Kennedy, joined by Rehnquist, White, Blackmun, O'Connor
- Dissent: Marshall, joined by Brennan
- Dissent: Scalia, joined by Stevens

Laws applied
- U.S. Const. amend. IV

National Treasury Employees Union v. Von Raab, 489 U.S. 656 (1989), was a United States Supreme Court case involving the Fourth Amendment and its implication on drug testing programs. The majority of the Court upheld the drug testing program in the United States Customs Service.

== Background ==
In 1986, the U.S. Customs Service imposed a drug testing program for "employees seeking transfer or promotion to positions having direct involvement in drug interdiction," required to carry firearms, or have access to classified information. The National Treasury Employees Union sued and alleged that the program was violative of the Fourth Amendment, which prohibits unreasonable search and seizure. The Court of Appeals for the Fifth Circuit ruled in favor of the government. The union then appealed to the Supreme Court. The Supreme Court upheld the Court of Appeals ruling with regard to positions involving drug interdiction and firearms. The ruling for classified information was held over, as the Supreme Court determined that the U.S. Customs Service too broadly included employee groups who would not generally have access to high levels of classified information.

== Opinion of the Court ==
The Supreme Court upheld the Court of Appeals ruling with regard to positions involving drug interdiction and firearms. The ruling for classified information was held over, as the Supreme Court determined that the U.S. Customs Service too broadly included employee groups who would not generally have access to high levels of classified information.

The majority decision authored by Justice Kennedy upheld the constitutionality of the drug testing program, reasoning that Customs employees had a "diminished expectation of privacy." Justice Marshall wrote a dissent in which he was joined by Justice Brennan; Justice Scalia wrote a dissent in which Justice Stevens joined.

== See also ==
- Vernonia School District 47J v. Acton (1997) and Board of Education v. Earls (2002), later cases dealing with and upholding drug testing in schools rather than customs service.
- Ferguson v. City of Charleston, a 2001 case striking down drug test imposed on pregnant women in hospitals.
- List of United States Supreme Court cases, volume 489
- List of United States Supreme Court cases
- Lists of United States Supreme Court cases by volume
- List of United States Supreme Court cases by the Rehnquist Court
