= List of United States Supreme Court cases, volume 489 =

This is a list of all United States Supreme Court cases from volume 489 of the United States Reports:

| Case name | Citation | Date decided |
|---|---|---|
| Texas Monthly, Inc. v. Bullock | 489 U.S. 1 | 1989 |
| Fort Wayne Books, Inc. v. Indiana | 489 U.S. 46 | 1989 |
| Blanchard v. Bergeron | 489 U.S. 87 | 1989 |
| Firestone Tire & Rubber Co. v. Bruch | 489 U.S. 101 | 1989 |
| Mesa v. California | 489 U.S. 121 | 1989 |
| Bonito Boats, Inc. v. Thunder Craft Boats, Inc. | 489 U.S. 141 | 1989 |
| Osterneck v. Ernst & Whinney | 489 U.S. 169 | 1989 |
| In re McDonald | 489 U.S. 180 | 1989 |
| DeShaney v. Dept. of Social Servs. | 489 U.S. 189 | 1989 |
| Eu v. San Francisco Cnty. Democratic Cent. Comm. | 489 U.S. 214 | 1989 |
| United States v. Ron Pair Enterprises, Inc. | 489 U.S. 235 | 1989 |
| Harris v. Reed | 489 U.S. 255 | 1989 |
| Teague v. Lane | 489 U.S. 288 | 1989 |
| Castille v. Peoples | 489 U.S. 346 | 1989 |
| United States v. Stuart | 489 U.S. 353 | 1989 |
| Canton v. Harris | 489 U.S. 378 | 1989 |
| Dugger v. Adams | 489 U.S. 401 | 1989 |
| Trans World Airlines, Inc. v. Flight Attendants | 489 U.S. 426 | 1989 |
| Volt Information Sciences, Inc. v. Stanford Univ. | 489 U.S. 468 | 1989 |
| Nw. Cent. Pipeline Corp. v. State Corp. Comm'n | 489 U.S. 493 | 1989 |
| Karahalios v. Fed. Employees | 489 U.S. 527 | 1989 |
| Blanton v. City of North Las Vegas | 489 U.S. 538 | 1989 |
| Barnard v. Thorstenn | 489 U.S. 546 | 1989 |
| Coit Independence Joint Venture v. FSLIC | 489 U.S. 561 | 1989 |
| Brower v. Inyo Cnty. | 489 U.S. 593 | 1989 |
| Skinner v. Railway Labor Executives' Ass'n | 489 U.S. 602 | 1989 |
| National Treasury Employees Union v. Von Raab | 489 U.S. 656 | 1989 |
| Board of Estimate of City of New York v. Morris | 489 U.S. 688 | 1989 |
| Schmuck v. United States | 489 U.S. 705 | 1989 |
| Comm'r v. Clark | 489 U.S. 726 | 1989 |
| Dept. of Justice v. Reporters Comm. | 489 U.S. 749 | 1989 |
| Tex. State Teachers Assn. v. Garland Independent Sch. Dist. | 489 U.S. 782 | 1989 |
| Midland Asphalt Corp. v. United States | 489 U.S. 794 | 1989 |
| Davis v. Dept. of Treasury | 489 U.S. 803 | 1989 |
| Frazee v. Dept. of Employment Security | 489 U.S. 829 | 1989 |
| Zant v. Moore | 489 U.S. 836 | 1989 |
| Oklahoma Tax Comm'n v. Graham | 489 U.S. 838 | 1989 |
| R.R. Signalmen v. SEPTA | 489 U.S. 1301 | 1989 |
