= National Treasury Employees Union =

American labor union

NTEU
- National Treasury Employees Union
- Founded: October 1939
- Headquarters: Washington, D.C.
- Location: United States
- Members: 105,804 (2025)
- Key people: Doreen P. Greenwald, National President
- Affiliations: none
- Website: www.nteu.org

The National Treasury Employees Union (NTEU) is an independent labor union representing 150,000 employees of 35 departments and agencies of the United States Government. The union specializes in representation of non-supervisory federal employees in every classification and pay level in civilian agencies.

== History ==
In 1938, a group of employees working in Wisconsin as Internal Revenue Collectors formed the National Association of Employees of Collectors of the Internal Revenue (NAECIR) with the goal of securing civil service protection, fair salaries and improved working conditions. Convinced that attempts to secure these rights and benefits through existing organizations would be futile, employees in the Bureau's Wisconsin District began to organize a group devoted exclusively to the interests of Internal Revenue employees. In October 1939, the first NAECIR Convention was held in Milwaukee to launch a permanent national organization.

When the agency was re-organized as the Internal Revenue Service in 1952, NAECIR broadened its scope to include all IRS workers, adopted a shorter name—the National Association of Internal Revenue Employees (NAIRE) -- and refocused its objectives to attract new members. At this point, IRS management officials and supervisors made up much of NAIRE's leadership and membership. While NAIRE attempted to function as a professional association, seeking to meet the specialized needs of IRS employees through congressional letter-writing campaigns, consultation with high-ranking IRS administrators, and social activities, due to management's dominating influence it remained weak, possessing neither definite goals nor the strong organizational structure required to promote the interests of its members. But in the early 1960s, management's influence in NAIRE was eliminated through the issuance of executive orders that banned supervisors and managers from participation in NAIRE's activities.

In 1966, newly elected national president Vincent L. Connery and his supporters defeated a proposed merger into the larger American Federation of Government Employees (AFGE). They launched organizing campaigns, adopted a new constitution, and began transformation from a social club into an active labor union. NAIRE received its charter as a federal employee union in 1967. In 1973, the union expanded again to include members throughout the Treasury Department and the organization's name was updated to the National Treasury Employees Union (NTEU); and the new NTEU began its drive to gain representation of the 13,000 U.S. Customs Service employees who were represented by either the National Customs Service Association (NCSA) or AFGE (which was raiding NCSA units). In 1975, with a guarantee to NCSA of participation in governing NTEU, a merger took place, representing the first group of non-IRS employees to be brought into NTEU. In 1977, it began to organize employees in other federal agencies; in 1978, employees of the Federal Communications Commission (FCC) became the first members outside the Treasury Department.

In August 1983, Connery retired as NTEU's national president and Robert M. Tobias, national executive vice president and general counsel, succeeded him. In August 1999, Colleen M. Kelley was first elected national president.

== Legal action ==
The NTEU has been famous for aggressive use of the courts to supplement their statutorily-limited powers to bargain and restraints on traditional labor tactics such as strikes and boycotts. In 1972, the union sued President Richard M. Nixon, challenging his decision to bypass Congress and postpone salary increases for all federal workers covered by the General Schedule. This lawsuit, NTEU v. Nixon, resulted in an unprecedented victory that required the government to pay over $533 million in back pay to federal employees. In another lawsuit, Boyce v. United States, the removal of two IRS service center employees was reversed, establishing for the first time the principles that an agency did not have total discretion in penalizing employees and that mitigating circumstances could render an agency-ordered removal an abuse of discretion. Shortly thereafter, in NTEU v. Fasser, the union won the right for federal employees to engage in informational picketing, an action previously deemed banned by federal law. During the Reagan and first Bush administrations, NTEU participated aggressively in numerous court battles. It took the issue of the constitutionality of random drug testing of Customs inspectors all the way to the U.S. Supreme Court in NTEU v. Von Raab and it successfully fought initiatives it viewed as anti-worker proposed by the head of the Office of Personnel Management (OPM).

On May 18, 2007, the Federal Labor Relations Authority (FLRA) certified NTEU as the sole representative of some 21,000 bargaining unit employees in the Bureau of Customs and Border Protection (CBP).

At the time of its formation in the Department of Homeland Security, CBP was made up of employees from three legacy agencies—the U.S. Customs Service, where NTEU had long been the representative; the Immigration and Naturalization Service and the Agriculture Department. In addition to these employees, CBP new hires since that time who did not have the benefit of a union presence will now be represented by NTEU.

The three-member FLRA, which oversees federal sector labor relations, rejected the final appeal of a losing union in a representation election last year covering the CBP workforce. NTEU won that election by more than a two-to-one margin—7,349 to 3,426.

In 2025, NTEU opened two lawsuits against Russell Vought in his official capacity as acting director of the Consumer Financial Protection Bureau for his order to halt work of federal employees in multiple agencies that NTEU represents by putting employees on an un-authorized type of leave, and a violation of the Privacy Act, which prohibits CFPB from disclosing employee records, by granting DOGE access "without employee consent." The suit asks the federal court in D.C. to stop CFPB from granting DOGE access to those records. The result of these cases is not yet known.

== Representation ==
NTEU represents some 150,000 employees nationwide and in the U.S. Virgin Islands, Puerto Rico, and Canada who work for:

- U.S. Department of Agriculture
  - Farm Production and Conservation Business Center
  - Food, Nutrition and Consumer Services
- Department of Commerce
  - Patent and Trademark Office
- Department of Defense
  - Federal Police Officers of Hawaii
- U.S. Department of Energy
- Department of Health and Human Services
  - Administration for Children and Families
  - Administration for Community Living
  - Food and Drug Administration
  - Health Resources and Services Administration
  - National Center for Health Statistics
  - Office of the Secretary
  - Program Support Center
  - Substance Abuse and Mental Health Services Administration
- Department of Homeland Security
  - U.S. Customs and Border Protection
  - Federal Law Enforcement Training Centers
- Department of the Interior
  - National Park Service
  - Bureau of Land Management
- U.S. Department of the Treasury
  - Bureau of Engraving and Printing
  - Bureau of the Fiscal Service
  - Departmental Offices
  - Internal Revenue Service
  - Office of Chief Counsel
  - Office of the Comptroller of the Currency
  - Alcohol and Tobacco Tax and Trade Bureau
- Commodity Futures Trading Commission
- Consumer Financial Protection Bureau
- Environmental Protection Agency
- Federal Communications Commission
- Federal Deposit Insurance Corporation
- Federal Election Commission
- Federal Housing Finance Agency
- National Credit Union Administration
- Nuclear Regulatory Commission
- Securities and Exchange Commission
- Social Security Administration
  - Office of Hearing Operations
