= Title 45 of the United States Code =

U.S. federal statutes on rail transport

Title 45 of the United States Code outlines the role of rail transport in the United States Code.

== Chapters ==
- Chapter 1: Safety Appliances and Equipment on Railroad Engines and Cars, and Protection of Employees and Travelers
- Chapter 2: Liability for Injuries to Employees
- Chapter 3: Hours of Service of Employees
- Chapter 4: Care of Animals in Transit
- Chapter 5: Government-Aided Railroads
- Chapter 6: Mediation, Conciliation, and Arbitration in Controversies Between Carriers and Employees
- Chapter 7: Adjustment Boards and Labor Boards
- Chapter 8: Railway Labor
- Chapter 9: Retirement of Railroad Employees
- Chapter 10: Tax on Carriers and Employees
- Chapter 11: Railroad Unemployment Insurance
- Chapter 12: Temporary Railroad Unemployment Insurance Program
- Chapter 13: Railroad Safety
- Chapter 14: Rail Passenger Service
- Chapter 15: Emergency Rail Services
- Chapter 16: Regional Rail Reorganization
- Chapter 17: Railroad Revitalization and Regulatory Reform
- Chapter 18: Milwaukee Railroad Restructuring
- Chapter 19: Rock Island Railroad Employee Assistance
- Chapter 20: Northeast Rail Service
- Chapter 21: Alaska Railroad Transfer
- Chapter 22: Conrail Privatization
