= FOIA exemption 3 =

Exemption 3 of the U.S. Freedom of Information Act, 5 U.S.C.§ 552(b)(3) prevents the disclosure of certain information that other statutes require be kept confidential. Under its terms, as amended in 1976 and 2009, a statute qualifies as an "Exemption 3 statute" only if it "(i) requires that the matters be withheld from the public in such a manner as to leave no discretion on the issue; or (ii) establishes particular criteria for withholding or refers to particular types of matters to be withheld." Additionally, any statute enacted after October 29, 2009, acting to exclude information release must contain a specific citation to subsection (b)(3) of the FOIA statute.

The U.S. Freedom of Information Act's exemptions from release of information can be found at 5 U.S.C. § 552(b)(1)-(9). Exemption 3 of FOIA is cited as 5 U.S.C. § 552(b)(3). In FOIA responses it is usually cited as just "(b)(3)". If a statute other than the FOIA specifically forbids the release of particular information or sets clear criteria for types of information not to be released, it is a (b)(3) statute.

There is no single authoritative list of such statutes. The U.S. Department of Justice, Office of Information Policy, creates a list of statutes that have been cited in the recent FOIA annual reports by agencies in the federal executive branch. This list is updated annually, but it consists only of statutes tested in court, e.g. FY2009 list, FY2013, or FY 2014. In addition, the list cites some statutes as to which there are conflicting opinions as to whether they are Exemption 3 statutes. In other words, the DOJ list includes statutes that been judged as a (b)(3) statute in some federal courts, but not others. These conflicting statutes are marked with asterisks. Not included in the DOJ's list are statutes that were not cited recently or have not been court tested.

A separate list is maintained by the Collaboration on Government Secrecy at American University Washington College of Law, and it suggests that the universe of Exemption 3 statutes is much greater. The Collaboration on Government Secrecy has determined that while agencies report using more than 300 separate statutes under Exemption 3 statute, careful academic analysis reveals that less than 160 distinct provisions of law truly qualify as Exemption 3, regardless of agency or court decisions. This list is updated periodically throughout the year, and it currently cites 156 statutes as correctly "vetted" ones. The Collaboration on Government Secrecy also maintains a list of leading Exemption 3 decisions, articles, and news.

== 2009 changes ==
The U.S. Department of Justice's Office of Information Policy frequently posts items concerning the FOIA called through FOIA Post. On March 10, 2010, it posted a summary of the OPEN FOIA Act of 2009, which was passed as Section 564 of the Department of Homeland Security Appropriations Act, 2010. The OPEN FOIA Act provides that new independent confidentiality provisions passed by Congress after the date of its enactment (October 29, 2009) must specifically state in the legislation that they are Exemption 3 statutes for FOIA purposes.

The subsection now reads: "(b)(3) specifically exempted from disclosure by statute (other than section 552(b) of this title), if that statute--(A)(i) requires that the matters be withheld from the public in such a manner as to leave no discretion on the issue; or (ii) establishes particular criteria for withholding or refers to particular types of matters to be withheld; and (B) if enacted after the date of enactment of the OPEN FOIA Act of 2009 (i.e., Oct. 29, 2009), specifically cites to this paragraph."

== Inapplicable statutes ==
Some federal agencies have incorrectly applied statutory provisions that are mistakenly believed to qualify as Exemption 3 statutes. The Collaboration on Government Secrecy at American University Washington College of Law has developed a list of several statutory provisions that sometimes are mistakenly believed to qualify as Exemption 3. The more than 150 incorrectly applied provisions identified as:

- 5 U.S.C. § 552a (Privacy Act of 1974)
- 10 U.S.C. § 130(d) (pertaining to certain "confidential business information and other sensitive but unclassified homeland security information")
- 10 U.S.C. § 618(f) (Repealed. Pub. L. 109–364, div. A, title V, Sec. 547(a)(2), Oct. 17, 2006, 120 Stat. 2216)
- 17 U.S.C. § 101 (Copyright Act of 1976)
- 18 U.S.C. § 795(a) (pertaining to the photographing and sketching of defense installations)
- 18 U.S.C. § 798 (pertaining to communications intelligence)
- 18 U.S.C. § 923(g) (pertaining to the licensing of firearm manufacturing, dealing, and importing)
- 18 U.S.C. § 1905 (Trade Secrets Act)
- 19 U.S.C. § 2605(h) (pertaining to cultural property under negotiation)
- 28 U.S.C. § 534 (pertaining to criminal history records)
- 42 U.S.C. § 423(a), (f) (pertaining to disability insurance benefit payments)
- 42 U.S.C. § 14132 (pertaining to the law enforcement exchange of DNA identification information)
