= Department of Justice v. Landano =

- Supreme Court of the United States

Argued February 24, 1993 Decided May 24, 1993
- Full case name: United States Department of Justice, et al. v. Vincent James Landano
- Citations: 508 U.S. 165 (more) 113 S. Ct. 2014; 124 L. Ed. 2d 84

Case history
- Prior: Landano v. United States Dep't of Justice, 758 F. Supp. 1021 (D.N.J. 1991); 956 F.2d 422 (3d Cir. 1992).

Holding
- The Court held that the Government is not entitled to a presumption that a source is confidential within the meaning of Exemption 7(D) of the Freedom of Information Act whenever the source provides information to the Federal Bureau of Investigation in the course of a criminal investigation.

Court membership
- Chief Justice William Rehnquist Associate Justices Byron White · Harry Blackmun; John P. Stevens · Sandra Day O'Connor; Antonin Scalia · Anthony Kennedy; David Souter · Clarence Thomas

Case opinion
- Majority: O'Connor, joined by unanimous

Laws applied
- 5 U.S.C. § 552 et seq.

Department of Justice v. Landano, 508 U.S. 165 (1993), was a case in which the Supreme Court of the United States held that the government is not entitled to a presumption that a source is confidential within the meaning of Exemption 7(D) of the Freedom of Information Act whenever the source provides information to the Federal Bureau of Investigation in the course of a criminal investigation.

== Background ==
=== Murder of Officer Snow ===
On August 13, 1976, during a robbery by two gunmen of the Hi-Way Check Cashing Service in Kearny, New Jersey, one of the gunman killed Newark police officer John Snow. A Hudson County Grand Jury indicted Allen Roller, Victor Forni, Bruce Reen, and Vincent James Landano for felony murder and armed robbery, along with other offenses.

The trials of Forni and Reen were severed from the trial of Roller and Landano. Roller entered into a plea deal with the Hudson County Prosecutor and gave damaging testimony against Landano during the trial. The state believed that Roller and Forni planned the robbery, but that only Landano and Roller actually participated in the crime.

An unindicted co-conspirator, David Lee Clyburn, testified that Roller and Forni planned the robbery, and that they planned to "take care of" a police officer who usually delivered large amounts of cash. Clyburn stated that he withdrew from the plan as he did not want to kill a police officer, and was concerned that as the only black, the others would turn on him. Roller's testimony was different from Clyburn's. Roller stated that while planning the robbery, Forni offered to recruit "Jimmy" (Note: Landano used the nickname Jimmy.) and that later Landano agreed to participate. Roller stated that Forni drove Landano and him to a parking lot, where they stole a car, and then Landano and Roller went to the site of the robbery.

Roller testified that after waiting they then robbed the Hi-Way Check Cashing Service. A customer, Colin McCormick identified Roller, but was unable to reliably identify Landano, stating that he never saw his face. The owner, Jacob Roth, and his son, Jonathan, also testified. Jacob stated that when the business was being robbed, he activated the silent alarm and "hit the deck", never looking up as the robbers took the cash. He tentatively identified Landano, saying that he "resembled" one of the robbers. Jonathan also identified Landano with uncertainty, noting that he only saw the robber for a second or two. John De Maritz, another customer, testified that Roller was the individual that entered the business and that he heard shots from outside.

Another man, Joseph Pascuitti, also testified against Landano. Pascuitti was the only one to witness the killing of Officer Snow, from his job adjacent to Hi-Way Check Cashing. Pascuitti stated that the shooter came towards the police car and shot Officer Snow without warning from two to three feet away. Prior to the trial, Pascuitti selected Forni's photograph as being the shooter, but that he was not certain.

Physical evidence found in the stolen car included a bloodstained jacket or vest, two pair of gloves, a blue hat, $60 in coins, a shell casing, and a partially filled coffee container. The blood type on the jacket matched that of Officer Snow, and was a relatively rare type. Two handguns were found in the river. Roller identified one of those as belonging to him, and the other as having been used by Landano. That handgun was registered to Forni. At the trial, Landano tried on the jacket, but it did not fit.

Landano testified in his own defense, and denied participating in the robbery. This was corroborated by his fiancé and her friend. In addition, Landano entered evidence that at 6:00 a.m., he was at a Staten Island methadone clinic and could not have made it back in time to help steal the car at 6:35 a.m.

Evidence showed that a motorcycle gang called "the Breed" planned the robbery, and that Landano was recruited for the crime. In May 1977, Landano was convicted on all counts and sentenced to imprisonment for life plus fifteen years.

=== Appeals ===
In June 1977, Landano filed an appeal. In October 1978, Landano obtained a court order for the consideration of a motion for a new trial based on newly discovered evidence. Judge Maurice A. Walsh, Jr. found the knowledge of evidence of prior robberies by Roller and Forni could have been important in the trial and that the knowledge of such evidence had been suppressed. If this knowledge had been revealed, Judge Walsh stated, then it "would have been probative in demonstrating, if Roller denied Forni's participation [in those robberies], that Roller was protecting Forni." However, the court decided that the suppression of this evidence did not violate Brady v. Maryland because the evidence wasn't "material," meaning that the evidence would not have changed the trial's outcome.

After various petitions from Landano and various hearings, a federal judge released Landano from prison in 1989 after Landano served 13 years of his life sentence on the grounds that the prosecution had systematically withheld evidence. On March 12, 1992, a New Jersey Court of Appeals ordered an evidentiary hearing to consider claims stemming from documents that two people, including a witness at the trial, failed to identify a photo of Landano, the police department's report that a witness identified Victor Forni as the driver of the getaway car and not Landano, and the failure to submit this information to Landano and his defense team before the trial began. The New Jersey Court of Appeals also ordered the hearing to investigate any impact that any potentially lost or damaged materials could have had on the trial.

After the evidentiary hearing discovered that evidence was withheld at the trial, Landano believed that the Court's ruling in Brady v. Maryland (373 U.S. 83) was violated when the prosecution in his murder trial withheld "material exculpatory evidence" (i.e. evidence extremely important for the defendant's case) during his trial. Landano filed FOIA requests with the FBI who had compiled evidence related to Landano's murder trial because, under the FOIA, anyone can request documents from any government agency to be released for whatever reason. However the FBI withheld some documents and redacted other documents without giving any reasons for doing so. Believing that this violated the FOIA, Landano brought his case to the Federal District Court in order to get the requested documents released. The FBI claimed that its withholding and redacting of documents was completely legal due to Exemption 7(D) of the Freedom of Information Act. Exemption 7(D) states that the government can withhold information if "records or information compiled for law enforcement purposes could reasonably be expected to disclose the identity of a confidential source --including a State, local, or foreign agency or authority or any private institution which furnished information on a confidential basis." The Federal District Court stated that the FBI had to give a legitimate reason for the withholding of information given by anyone other than a regular law enforcement agency informant. The Court of Appeals agreed and rejected the FBI's argument that confidentiality can be presumed whenever an individual provides information to the FBI during a criminal investigation. The Court of Appeals also rejected the FBI's argument that confidentiality can be presumed based on an investigation's subject matter. Instead, the Court of Appeals held that the FBI had to provide a detailed explanation for each and every confidentiality claim it makes on a case-by-case basis instead of using a general guideline for what qualifies as confidential as it had done in response to Landano's requests.

Another Court of Appeals also rejected the FBI's claim that the documents were confidential in terms of Exemption 7(D). However, this second court stated that the FBI's claim to confidentiality for the purposes of Exemption 7(D) had backing from a number of previous court decisions. This Court of Appeals considered itself bound by a previous court's decision in Lame v. United States Department of Justice 654 F.2d 917 (CA3 1981) and decided that the FBI could not presume confidentiality on the terms of the investigation's subject matter or on the fact that an informant is giving information to the FBI for a criminal case, but rather the FBI had to provide "detailed explanations related to each alleged confidential source"

The Supreme Court decided to grant a writ of certiorari in order "to resolve the conflict among the Courts of Appeals over the nature of the FBI's evidentiary burden under Exemption 7(D)."

=== Historical context ===
The FBI had a long history of releasing and then redacting various records and claiming that this was completely legal according to exemption sections in the FOIA Sometimes, these redactions interfered with court cases and research. According to Athan Theoharis, an American historian who wanted to research FBI files, the FBI "so heavily redacted the released records as to preclude needed research." About two-thirds of the files Theoharis asked for in relation to his research were withheld from him. This gives an example of the extent to which the FBI used the exemptions in the Freedom of Information Act. The FBI was notorious for such redactions and withholdings, and many believed that it interfered with justice being carried out. With the advent of Landano's case before the Supreme Court, the FBI's excessive use of the exemptions in the FOIA were finally being questioned.

=== Arguments ===
Vincent James Landano argued that the evidence he requested should not have been withheld according to Exemption 7(D) because the FBI might have been obliged to reveal the names of sources according to Brady v. Maryland. Landano also believed that a source is considered "confidential" (for purposes of Exemption 7(D)) only if the source can be completely assured, either explicitly through the actually stating of such assurance or implicitly (implied) that the source's cooperation with the FBI will not be disclosed to anyone. The FBI, however, argued that "confidentiality" in terms to Exemption 7(D) can be presumed based on either an investigation's subject matter or the simple fact that an informant is giving information to the FBI.

== Opinion of the Court ==
The Supreme Court ruled unanimously in favor of Vincent James Landano. Justice Sandra Day O'Connor delivered the opinion of the Court.

O'Connor rejected the FBI's argument that confidentiality can be presumed based on the fact that an informant is giving information to the FBI. Justice O'Connor also rejected most forms of categorical presumptions of confidentiality that the FBI often used, such as automatic confidentiality for the purposes of Exemption 7(D) for all documents that are collected for a criminal investigation (which is one of the categorical presumptions the FBI used in this specific case). Justice O'Connor sarcastically stated that, under the way the FBI declared the confidentiality of documents, the FBI would expect that every single one of its documents can be withheld or redacted and that it can use Exemption 7(D) for all of its documents.

O'Connor did, however, state that the Court accepts certain forms of categorical presumptions of confidentiality. But these categorical presumptions are a lot more narrowly defined than what the FBI had previously used. Justice O'Connor gave the scenario of a paid informant as an example of an accepted categorical presumption of confidentiality. She stated that a paid informant can expect that his/her cooperation with the FBI will be kept secret, and that this makes documents related to a paid informant subject to being withheld or redacted in accordance with Exemption 7(D). She also stated that, in murder cases like this one, informants may also expect to have their interactions with the FBI be confidential. Justice O'Connor said that the Court would accept the FBI's presumption of the confidentiality of any documents related to an informant for a murder case.

Finally, O'Connor rejected the FBI's argument that all its sources must be confidential in order to maintain effective law enforcement. The presumption of confidentiality that the FBI makes of presuming that a source and documents related to a source are confidential simply based on the fact that a source gave information to the FBI in the course of a criminal investigation was also rejected by Justice O'Connor. She stated that any source related to any type of criminal case the FBI handles should not be considered confidential simply because information was given for a criminal case. While she believed that murder cases would warrant an accurate presumption of confidentiality, she opposed the view that the FBI can presume confidentiality for every type of criminal case it deals with.

The Court concluded by stating that, when the nature of the crime investigated and when a source's relation to the crime lead to a safe inference of confidentiality, confidentiality can be presumed. This is a much more narrow approach to what can be defined as confidential in terms of Exemption 7(D) than the FBI's approach. The Supreme Court thus rejected the decisions of the courts of appeal and declared them inaccurate. The Court remanded the case back to a court of appeals, ordering such a court to rule according to the new guidelines the Supreme Court had just laid out in its decision.

== Subsequent developments ==
This case was the first time the Supreme Court dealt with Exemption 7(D) of the Freedom of Information Act and the United States government's use of it. The United States Department of Justice now uses more rigorous standards in determining what can be withheld under Exemption 7(D) and now uses more detailed and case-specific proofs for why a document cannot be released to the public. Even at the administrative level, Landano decision must be and is followed.

Vincent James Landano received the documents he requested in accordance with the Supreme Court's decision. In 1994, a court of appeals voided Landano's murder conviction and returned the case to Hudson County, New Jersey, for a retrial. Landano was acquitted of murder in the retrial in 1998. He died on November 11, 2002, at the age of 63 at a hospital in Toms River, New Jersey.

== See also ==
- List of United States Supreme Court cases
- List of United States Supreme Court cases, volume 508
- List of United States Supreme Court cases by the Rehnquist Court
