= Federal Aviation Administration v. Cooper =

- Supreme Court of the United States

Argued November 30, 2011 Decided March 28, 2012
- Full case name: Federal Aviation Administration, Social Security Administration, United States Department of Transportation, Petitioners v. Stanmore Cawthon Cooper
- Docket no.: 10-1024
- Citations: 566 U.S. 284 (more) 132 S. Ct. 1441; 182 L. Ed. 2d 497; 2012 U.S. LEXIS 2539; 80 U.S.L.W. 4289; 23 Fla. L. Weekly Fed. S 222
- Argument: Oral argument

Case history
- Prior: Summary judgment for respondent, 816 F. Supp. 2d 778 (N.D. Cal. 2008); reversed and remanded, 596 F.3d 538 (9th Cir. 2010); rehearing denied, 622 F.3d 1016 (9th Cir. 2010); cert. granted, 564 U.S. 1018 (2011).

Holding
- The authorization of suits against the government for “actual damages” in the Privacy Act of 1974 is not sufficiently clear to constitute a waiver of sovereign immunity from suits for mental and emotional distress.

Court membership
- Chief Justice John Roberts Associate Justices Antonin Scalia · Anthony Kennedy; Clarence Thomas · Ruth Bader Ginsburg; Stephen Breyer · Samuel Alito; Sonia Sotomayor · Elena Kagan

Case opinions
- Majority: Alito, joined by Roberts, Scalia, Kennedy, Thomas
- Dissent: Sotomayor, joined by Ginsburg, Breyer
- Kagan took no part in the consideration or decision of the case.

Laws applied
- Privacy Act of 1974

Federal Aviation Administration v. Cooper, 566 U.S. 284 (2012), was a United States Supreme Court case in which the Court held that "actual damages" under the Privacy Act of 1974 is not clear enough to allow damages for suits for mental and emotional distress. The reasoning behind this is that the United States Congress, when authorizing suit against the government, must be clear in waiving the government's sovereign immunity.

== Background ==
Stanmore Cawthon Cooper was a licensed pilot since 1964. He was diagnosed with the human immunodeficiency virus (HIV) in 1985, but he did not inform the Federal Aviation Administration (FAA) because at the time of his diagnosis the FAA would not allow pilots with HIV to keep flying. He also feared that if his sexual orientation was disclosed he would suffer discrimination in many aspects of his life. So to keep his pilot's license during renewal periods, Cooper withheld that information from his renewal certifications. Cooper renewed his medical certificate in 1994, 1998, 2000, 2002, and 2004 without disclosing his HIV status. In 1995, Cooper was no longer able to work because of his medical condition, Cooper filed for Social Security Disability from the Social Security Administration (SSA) and was granted long-term disability benefits, under Title II of the Social Security Act, 42 U.S.C. § 401. Cooper disclosed his HIV status to the Social Security Administration, believing that his medical information was protected under the Privacy Act.

=== Operation Safe Pilot ===
In 2002, the FAA and the United States Department of Transportation started a criminal investigation in cooperation with the SSA called Operation Safe Pilot. The program's goal was to find people who were fraudulently collecting disability benefits or who had material misstatements on their FAA medical certifications. Operation Safe Pilot was run by the Office of Inspector General for the Department of Transportation (DOT-OIG).

In July 2002, the FAA had disclosed the names and other information of all active certified pilots. In November 2003, the DOT-OIG disclosed files on 45,000 pilots in Northern California, including the pilots' names, dates of birth, social security numbers, and genders. In March 2003, the SSA-OIG gave the DOT-OIG three spread sheets summarizing and cross checking the 45,000 pilots who had received Title II Social Security Benefits and those who had received Title XVI benefits.

=== Investigation and criminal prosecution of Cooper ===
Based on the release of information from the Social Security Administration, the DOT-OIG classified Cooper as a person of interest, as he had received disability benefits and had not disclosed it to the FAA.

In March 2005, agents met with Cooper, where he confessed to having intentionally withheld his medical condition from the FAA on his pilot medical certificate renewal. That same month, the FAA grounded Cooper for his misrepresentation to the FAA. In August 2005, Cooper was indicted on three counts of making a false statement to a government agency, and one count of making and delivering a false official writing, a misdemeanor. He was sentenced to two years of probation and fined $1,000.

=== Lawsuit against the FAA ===
In March 2007, Cooper filed a lawsuit in the Northern District of California against the Government for "willful or intentional" violations of the 1974 Privacy Act, 5 U.S.C. § 552a, and that such violation caused him "to suffer humiliation, embarrassment, mental anguish, fear of social ostracism, and other severe emotional distress." The Privacy Act includes a private right of action that allows citizens to sue the federal government if an agency makes an unauthorized disclosure that has an "adverse effect" on the individual. In Doe v. Chao, 540 U.S. 614 (2004), the Supreme Court held that even when a plaintiff shows that the Government violated the Privacy Act by disclosing his Social Security Number, an individual must prove some actual damages before he can receive the minimum $1,000 award. The district court held that the Government violated the Privacy Act, but that the Act only allows recovery for pecuniary damages. Having failed to state such a claim, the court ruled that Cooper could not make a claim for relief under the Act. That court also held that when the statutory language is ambiguous, the "sovereign immunity canon" requires a court to construe the damages provision in favor of the Government. The case was dismissed. Cooper appealed to the United States Court of Appeals for the Ninth Circuit.

==== Ninth Circuit holding ====
The Court of Appeal looked at the summary judgment de novo, and held that mental and emotional damages constitute "actual damages" under the Privacy Act. Calling Congress' intent to allow recovery for mental and emotional damages "unambiguous", the Ninth Circuit also held that the sovereign immunity canon was inapplicable in this case. Congress waived sovereign immunity, the court reasoned, by allowing citizens who were injured by the release of information to initiate a civil action. The Court of Appeals stated "Unfortunately, there is no ordinary or plain meaning of the term actual damages because it is a legal term of art. As a result, ordinary dictionaries are of no assistance in clarifying the plain meaning of the term." The ninth circuit reversed and remanded the case back to the district court.

== Opinion of the Supreme Court ==
The Supreme Court granted certiorari in 2011, after the United States Court of Appeals for the Ninth Circuit denied a rehearing of the case. The Supreme Court disagreed with the Appeals Court, saying that "Waiver of sovereign immunity must be 'unequivocally expressed" in the statutory text. The court went on to say that "Congress need not state its intent in any particular way. We have never required that Congress use magic words." The court held that as the 9th Circuit stated, "actual damages" is a legal term of art and its meaning is far from clear. Like the Ninth Circuit the Supreme Court stated that "actual damages has this chameleon like quality, we cannot rely on any all-purpose definition but must consider the particular context in which the term appears."

The Supreme Court held that the Privacy Act does not unequivocally authorize an award of damages for mental or emotional distress. Accordingly, the Act does not waive the Federal Government's sovereign immunity from the liability.

=== Sotomayor dissent ===
The dissent was joined by Ginsburg and Breyer. The dissent argues that "actual damages" for the Privacy Act does only allow for pecuniary loss alone, and pointed out that the Privacy Act was expressly designed to prevent agency conduct which results in intangible harms to the individual as a result of privacy violations.

After today, no matter how debilitating and substantial the resulting mental anguish, an individual harmed by a federal agency's intentional or willful violation of the Privacy Act will be left without a remedy unless he or she is able to prove pecuniary harm. That is not the result Congress intended when it enacted an Act with the express purpose of safeguarding individual privacy against Government invasion. And it is not a result remotely suggested by anything in the text, structure, or history of the Act. For those reasons, I respectfully dissent.

— FAA v. Cooper, Sotomayor, J., dissent, Ginsburg and Breyer, JJ., concurring

== Subsequent developments ==
The lawsuit with Cooper prompted the FAA to change the notice on the FAA Form 8500-8 Medical certificate Application For Airman Medical Certificate. The form now provides notice that the FAA will, as needed, compare data with other agencies that might be providing disability benefits to the individual. Because of these changes, everyone applying for their medical certification have been duly informed and have given the FAA permission to share data as needed.

The FAA gave Cooper a medical clearance in March 2006, and restored Private Pilot Certificate Airman Card on March 1, 2008.

=== Proposed New Laws ===
Legislation proposed to address the court's ruling was included in the Cybersecurity Act of 2012 (S. 3414), but the bill was filibustered by Senate Republicans. Senator Daniel Akaka (D-HI) attempted to call for a vote on this bill, stating

Finally, it would address the Supreme Court’s ruling restricting Privacy Act remedies earlier this year that has by many experts’ accounts rendered the Privacy Act toothless. In Federal Aviation Administration v. Cooper, the Social Security Administration violated the Privacy Act by sharing the plaintiff’s HIV status with other federal agencies. The Court concluded that the plaintiff could not recover damages for emotional distress because Privacy Act damages are limited to economic harm. My amendment would heed the call of scholars across the political spectrum to amend the Privacy Act and fix this decision. It would also clarify that in the event of a federal violation in the information sharing title of the bill, a victim would be entitled to recovery for the same types of non-economic harms.

== See also ==
- List of United States Supreme Court cases, volume 566
