= Freedom of Information Act (United States) =

1967 U.S. statute on access to government information

- Long title: An Act to amend section 3 of the Administrative Procedure Act, chapter 324, of the Act of June 11, 1946 (60 Stat. 238), to clarify and protect the right of the public to information, and for other purposes
- Acronyms (colloquial): FOIA
- Nicknames: Public Information Act of 1966; Public Information Availability
- Enacted by: the 89th United States Congress
- Effective: July 5, 1967

Citations
- Public law: 89-487
- Statutes at Large: 80 Stat. 250

Codification
- Acts amended: Administrative Procedure Act
- Titles amended: 5 U.S.C.: Government Organization and Employees
- U.S.C. sections created: 5 U.S.C. ch. 5, subch. II § 552

Legislative history
- Introduced in the Senate as S. 1160 by Edward Long (D–MO) on October 4, 1965; Committee consideration by Committee on the Judiciary and Committee on Government Operations; Passed the Senate on October 13, 1965 (passed); Passed the House on June 20, 1966 (306–0); Signed into law by President Lyndon B. Johnson on July 4, 1966

Major amendments
- Privacy Act of 1974, PL 93–579, 88 Stat 1896; Government in the Sunshine Act, PL 94–409, 90 Stat 1241; Anti-Drug Abuse Act of 1986, PL 99–570, 100 Stat 3207; Electronic Freedom of Information Act of 1996; The Intelligence Authorization Act of 2002, PL 107-306, 116 Stat 2383; OPEN Government Act of 2007, PL 110-175, 121 Stat 2524; Wall Street Reform Act of 2010; FOIA Improvement Act of 2016

United States Supreme Court cases
- Renegotiation Board v. Bannercraft Clothing Co., 415 U.S. 1 (1974); Administrator, Federal Aviation Administration v. Robertson, 422 U.S. 255 (1975); Department of Air Force v. Rose, 425 U.S. 352 (1976); National Labor Relations Board v. Robbins Tire & Rubber Co., 437 U.S. 214 (1978); Chrysler Corp. v. Brown, 441 U.S. 281 (1979); Federal Open Market Committee of Federal Reserve System v. Merrill, 443 U.S. 340 (1979); Kissinger v. Reporters Comm. for Freedom of Press, 445 U.S. 136 (1980); Forsham v. Harris, 445 U.S. 169 (1980); Consumer Product Safety Commission v. GTE Sylvania, Inc., 447 U.S. 102 (1980); Baldrige v. Shapiro, 455 U.S. 345 (1982); United States Department of State v. Washington Post Co., 456 U.S. 595 (1982); Federal Bureau of Investigation v. Abramson, 456 U.S. 615 (1982); Federal Trade Commission v. Grolier Inc., 462 U.S. 19 (1983); United States v. Weber Aircraft Corp., 465 U.S. 792 (1984); Department of Justice v. Provenzano, 469 U.S. 14 (1984); Central Intelligence Agency v. Sims, 471 U.S. 159 (1985); Church of Scientology v. Internal Revenue Service, 484 U.S. 9 (1987); Department of Justice v. Julian, 486 U.S. 1 (1988); Department of Justice v. Reporters Committee for Freedom of the Press, 489 U.S. 749 (1989); United States Department of Justice v. Tax Analysts, 492 U.S. 136 (1989); John Doe Agency v. John Doe Corp., 493 U.S. 146 (1989); United States Department of State v. Ray, 502 U.S. 164 (1991); Department of Justice v. Landano, 508 U.S. 165 (1993); United States Department of Defense v. Federal Labor Relations Authority, 510 U.S. 487 (1994); Bibles, Oregon Director, Bureau of Land Management v. Oregon Natural Desert Association, 519 U.S. 355 (1997); Department of Interior v. Klamath Water Users Protective Assn., 532 U.S. 1 (2001); National Archives & Records Administration v. Favish, 541 U.S. 157 (2004); Taylor v. Sturgell, 553 U.S. 880 (2008); FCC v. AT&T Inc., 562 U.S. 397 (2011); Milner v. Department of Navy, 562 U.S. 562 (2011); Schindler Elevator Corp. v. United States ex rel. Kirk, 563 U.S. 401 (2011); Food Marketing Institute v. Argus Leader Media, No. 18-481, 588 U.S. ___ (2019); United States Fish and Wildlife Service v. Sierra Club, No. 19-547, 592 U.S. ___ (2021)

The Freedom of Information Act (FOIA /ˈfɔɪjə/ FOY-yə), 5 U.S.C. § 552, is the United States federal freedom of information law that requires the full or partial disclosure of previously unreleased or uncirculated information and documents controlled by the United States federal government upon request. The act defines agency records subject to disclosure, outlines mandatory disclosure procedures, and includes nine exemptions that define categories of information not subject to disclosure. The act was intended to make U.S. government agencies' functions more transparent so that the American public could more easily identify problems in government functioning and put pressure on Congress, agency officials, and the president to address them. The FOIA has been changed by both the legislative and executive branches.

The FOIA is commonly known for being invoked by news organizations for reporting purposes, though such uses make up less than 10% of all requests—which are more frequently made by businesses, law firms, and individuals.

== Background ==
As indicated by its long title, the Freedom of Information Act (FOIA) was moved from its original home in Section 3 of the Administrative Procedure Act (APA). Section 3 of the APA, as enacted in 1946, gave agencies broad discretion concerning the publication of governmental records. Following concerns that the provision had become more of a withholding than a disclosure mechanism, Congress amended the section in 1966 as a standalone act to implement "a general philosophy of full agency disclosure". The amendment required agencies to publish their rules of procedure in the Federal Register, 5 U.S.C. § 552(a)(1)(C), and to make available for public inspection and copying their opinions, statements of policy, interpretations, and staff manuals and instructions that are not already published in the Federal Register, § 552(a)(2).

In addition, § 552(a)(3) requires every agency, "upon any request for records which reasonably describes such records" to make such records "promptly available to any person". By § 552(a)(4)(B) if an agency improperly withholds any documents, the district court has jurisdiction to order their production. Unlike the review of other agency action that must be upheld if supported by substantial evidence and not arbitrary or capricious, FOIA expressly places the burden "on the agency to sustain its action", and directs the district courts to "determine the matter de novo".

With the ongoing stress on both constitutional and inherent rights of American citizens and the added assertion of government subservience to the individual, some, particularly representative John E. Moss, thought that it was necessary for government information to be available to the public. That push relied on existing principles and protocols of government administration already in place.

Although some officials, including President Lyndon B. Johnson, believed certain unclassified government information should remain confidential, Congress moved to increase transparency. In 1966, despite opposition from the White House, Congress expanded Section 3 of the Administrative Procedure Act to promote the public's right to access government records. The Privacy Act of 1974 was later enacted to protect personal information held by the government.

== Scope ==
The act explicitly applies only to government agencies under the executive branch. These agencies are required by several mandates to comply with public solicitation of information. Along with making public and accessible all bureaucratic and technical procedures for applying for documents from that agency, agencies are also subject to penalties for hindering the process of a petition for information. According to the act, if "agency personnel acted arbitrarily or capriciously with respect to the withholding, the Special Counsel shall promptly initiate a proceeding to determine whether disciplinary action is warranted against the officer or employee who was primarily responsible for the withholding." In this way, there is recourse for one seeking information to go to a federal court if suspicion of illegal tampering or delayed sending of records exists. However, nine exemptions address issues of sensitivity and personal rights. They are (as listed in 5 U.S.C. § 552):

1. (A) specifically authorized under criteria established by an Executive order to be kept secret in the interest of national defense or foreign policy and (B) are in fact properly classified pursuant to such Executive order;
2. related solely to the internal personnel rules and practices of an agency;
3. specifically exempted from disclosure by statute (other than section 552b of this title), provided that such statute (A) requires that the matters be withheld from the public in such a manner as to leave no discretion on the issue, or (B) establishes particular criteria for withholding or refers to particular types of matters to be withheld; FOIA Exemption 3 Statutes
4. trade secrets and commercial or financial information obtained from a person and privileged or confidential;
5. inter-agency or intra-agency memoranda or letters which would not be available by law to a party other than an agency in litigation with the agency;
6. personnel and medical files and similar files the disclosure of which would constitute a clearly unwarranted invasion of personal privacy;
7. records or information compiled for law enforcement purposes, but only to the extent that the production of such law enforcement records or information (A) could reasonably be expected to interfere with enforcement proceedings, (B) would deprive a person of a right to a fair trial or an impartial adjudication, (C) could reasonably be expected to constitute an unwarranted invasion of personal privacy, (D) could reasonably be expected to disclose the identity of a confidential source, including a State, local, or foreign agency or authority or any private institution which furnished information on a confidential basis, and, in the case of a record or information compiled by a criminal law enforcement authority in the course of a criminal investigation or by an agency conducting a lawful national security intelligence investigation, information furnished by a confidential source, (E) would disclose techniques and procedures for law enforcement investigations or prosecutions, or would disclose guidelines for law enforcement investigations or prosecutions if such disclosure could reasonably be expected to risk circumvention of the law, or (F) could reasonably be expected to endanger the life or physical safety of any individual;
8. contained in or related to examination, operating, or condition reports prepared by, on behalf of, or for the use of an agency responsible for the regulation or supervision of financial institutions; or
9. geological and geophysical information and data, including maps, concerning wells.

The Postal Reorganization Act of 1970 (at 39 U.S.C. § 410(c)(2)) exempts the U.S. Postal Service from disclosure of "information of a commercial nature, including trade secrets, whether or not obtained from a person outside the Postal Service, which under good business practice would not be publicly disclosed".

A federal court has concisely described the vital role of the FOIA in democracy:

It has often been observed that the central purpose of the FOIA is to "open … up the workings of government to public scrutiny." One of the premises of that objective is the belief that "an informed electorate is vital to the proper operation of a democracy." A more specific goal implicit in the foregoing principles is to give citizens access to the information on the basis of which government agencies make their decisions, thereby equipping the populace to evaluate and criticize those decisions.

== Legislative history ==
The law came about because of the determination of U.S. House of Representatives member John E. Moss of California, who was chairman of the House Government Information Subcommittee. It took Moss 12 years to get the FOIA through Congress. Much of the desire for government transparency stemmed from the Department of Defense and Congressional committees evaluation of the nation's classification system in the late 1950s. They determined that the misuse of government classification of documents was causing insiders to leak documents that were marked "confidential". The committee also determined that the lowest rung of the confidentiality ladder "confidential" should be removed. They deemed that "secret" and "top secret" covered national security adequately. The Moss Committee took it upon itself to reform confidentiality policy and implement punishments for the overuse of classification by officials and departments.

=== Initial enactment ===
The FOIA was initially introduced as the bill S. 1160 in the 89th Congress. When the two-page bill was signed into law, it became Pub. L. 89–487, 80 Stat. 250, enacted July 4, 1966, but had an effective date of one year after the date of enactment, or July 4, 1967. The law set up the structure of FOIA as we know it today. President Lyndon B. Johnson, despite his misgivings, signed the FOIA into law.

That law was initially repealed. During the period between the enactment of the act and its effective date, Title 5 of the United States Code was enacted into positive law. For reasons now unclear but which may have had to do with the way the enactment of Title 5 changed how the law being amended was supposed to be cited, the original Freedom of Information Act was replaced. A new act in Pub. L. 90–23, 81 Stat. 54, enacted June 5, 1967 (originally H.R. 5357 in the 90th Congress), repealed the original and put in its place a substantively identical law. This statute was signed on June 5, 1967, and had the same effective date as the original statute: July 4, 1967.

== Amendments and executive actions ==
=== Privacy Act Amendments of 1974 ===
Following the Watergate scandal, President Gerald R. Ford wanted to sign FOIA-strengthening amendments in the Privacy Act of 1974, but White House Chief of Staff Donald Rumsfeld and deputy Dick Cheney were concerned about leaks. Assistant Attorney General for the Office of Legal Counsel Antonin Scalia advised the bill was unconstitutional and even telephoned the CIA asking them to lobby a particular White House staffer. President Ford was persuaded to veto the bill on October 17, 1974, according to documents declassified in 2004. However, on November 21, the lame-duck Congress overrode President Ford's veto, giving the United States the core Freedom of Information Act still in effect today, with judicial review of executive secrecy claims.

Scalia remained highly critical of the 1974 amendments, writing years later that "It is the Taj Mahal of the Doctrine of Unanticipated Consequences, the Sistine Chapel of Cost-Benefit Analysis Ignored." Scalia particularly disliked the availability of judicial review, decrying that if "an agency denies a freedom of information request, shazam!—the full force of the Third Branch of the government is summoned to the wronged party's assistance."

Those amendments to the FOIA regulate government control of documents that concern a citizen. They give one "(1) the right to see records about [one]self, subject to the Privacy Act's exemptions, (2) the right to amend that record if it is inaccurate, irrelevant, untimely, or incomplete, and (3) the right to sue the government for violations of the statute including permitting others to see [one's] records unless specifically permitted by the Act." In conjunction with the FOIA, the Privacy Act is used to further the rights of an individual gaining access to information held by the government. The Justice Department's Office of Information and Privacy and federal district courts are the two channels of appeal available to seekers of information.

=== 1976 Government in the Sunshine Act amendments ===
In 1976, as part of the Government in the Sunshine Act, Exemption 3 of the FOIA was amended so that several exemptions were specified:

1. Information relating to national defense,
2. Related solely to internal personnel rules and practices,
3. Related to accusing a person of a crime,
4. Related to information where disclosure would constitute a breach of privacy,
5. Related to investigatory records where the information would harm the proceedings,
6. Related to information which would lead to financial speculation or endanger the stability of any financial institution, and
7. Related to the agency's participation in legal proceedings.

=== 1982 executive order limiting the FOIA ===
Between 1982 and 1995, President Ronald Reagan's Executive Order 12356 allowed federal agencies to withhold enormous amounts of information under Exemption 1 (relating to national security information), claiming it would better protect the country and strengthen national security.

The outcry from the effect that the Reagan Order had on FOIA requests was a factor in leading President Clinton to dramatically alter the criteria in 1995.

=== 1986 Omnibus Anti-Drug Abuse Act amendments to the FOIA ===
The FOIA amendments were a small part of the bipartisan Anti-Drug Abuse Act of 1986. Congress amended FOIA to address the fees charged by different categories of requesters and the scope of access to law enforcement and national security records. The amendments are not referenced in the congressional reports on the Act, so the floor statements provide an indication of Congressional intent.

=== 1995–99 expansion ===
Between 1995 and 1999, President Bill Clinton issued executive directives (and amendments to the directives) that allowed the release of previously classified national security documents more than 25 years old and of historical interest, as part of the FOIA. This release of information allowed many previously publicly unknown details about the Cold War and other historical events to be discussed openly.

=== Electronic Freedom of Information Act Amendments of 1996 ===
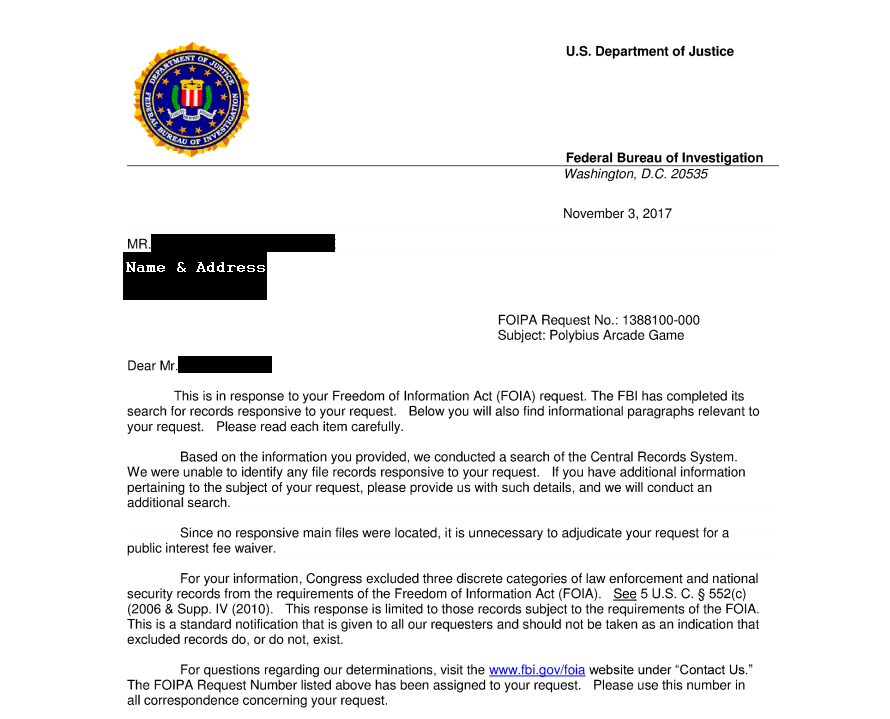
An example of an E-FOIA request. This particular request concerns possible records the FBI might have on the Polybius urban legend.

The Electronic Freedom of Information Act Amendments of 1996 (E-FOIA) stated that all agencies are required by statute to make certain types of records, created by the agency on or after November 1, 1996, available electronically. Agencies must also provide electronic reading rooms for citizens to use to have access to records. Given the large volume of records and limited resources, the amendment also extended the agencies' required response time to FOIA requests. Formerly, the response time was ten days and the amendment extended it to twenty business days.

=== 2001 executive order limiting the FOIA ===
Executive Order 13233, drafted by Alberto R. Gonzales and issued by President George W. Bush on November 1, 2001, restricted access to the records of former presidents.

This order was revoked on January 21, 2009, as part of President Barack Obama's Executive Order 13489. Public access to presidential records was restored to the original extent of five years (12 for some records) outlined in the Presidential Records Act.

=== Intelligence Authorization Act of 2002 amending the FOIA ===
In 2002, Congress passed the Intelligence Authorization Act for Fiscal Year 2003, Pub. L. 107–306 (text) (PDF). Within this omnibus legislation were amendments to the FOIA (pertaining mainly to intelligence agencies) entitled "Prohibition on Compliance with Requests for Information Submitted by Foreign Governments":

Section 552(a)(3) of title 5, United States Code, is amended—

(1) in subparagraph (A) by inserting "and except as provided in subparagraph (E)", after "of this subsection"; and

(2) by adding at the end the following:

(E) An agency, or part of an agency, that is an element of the intelligence community (as that term is defined in section 3(4) of the National Security Act of 1947 (50 U.S.C. § 401a(4))) shall not make any record available under this paragraph to—

(i) any government entity, other than a State, territory, commonwealth, or district of the United States, or any subdivision thereof; or
(ii) a representative of a government entity described in clause (i).

In effect, this new language precluded any covered U.S. intelligence agency from disclosing records in response to FOIA requests made by foreign governments or international governmental organizations. By its terms, it prohibits disclosure in response to requests made by such non-U.S. governmental entities either directly or through a "representative". This means that for any FOIA request that by its nature appears as if it might have been made by or on behalf of a non-U.S. governmental entity, a covered agency may inquire into the particular circumstances of the requester in order to properly implement this new FOIA provision.

The agencies affected by this amendment are those that are part of, or contain "an element of", the "intelligence community". As defined in the National Security Act of 1947 (as amended), they consist of the CIA, the National Security Agency, the Defense Intelligence Agency, the National Imagery and Mapping Agency, the National Reconnaissance Office (and certain other reconnaissance offices within the Department of Defense), the intelligence elements of the Army, the Navy, the Air Force, and the Marine Corps, the FBI, the Department of the Treasury, the Department of Energy, and the Coast Guard, the Department of Homeland Security, the Bureau of Intelligence and Research in the Department of State, and "such other elements of any other department or agency as may be designated by the President, or designated jointly by the Director of Central Intelligence and the head of the department or agency concerned, as an element of the intelligence community".

=== OPEN Government Act of 2007 ===
President George W. Bush signed the Openness Promotes Effectiveness in our National Government Act of 2007, Pub. L. 110–175 (text) (PDF), on December 31, 2007. This law, also known as the "OPEN Government Act of 2007", amended the federal FOIA statute in several ways. According to a White House press release, it does so by:

1. establishing a definition of "a representative of the news media;"
2. directing that required attorney fees be paid from an agency's own appropriation rather than from the Judgment Fund;
3. prohibiting an agency from assessing certain fees if it fails to comply with FOIA deadlines; and
4. establishing an Office of Government Information Services (OGIS) in the National Archives and Records Administration to review agency compliance with FOIA.

Changes include the following:

- it recognizes electronic media specifically and defines "News Media" as "any person or entity that gathers information of potential interest to a segment of the public, uses its editorial skills to turn the raw materials into a distinct work, and distributes that work to an audience."
- it extends the 20-day deadline by allowing for up to 10 days between the FOIA office of the agency and the component of the agency holding the records and specifically allows for clarification of requests by the FOIA office (Effective 12/31/2007).
- it calls for each agency to designate a FOIA Public Liaison, "who shall assist in the resolution of any disputes" (Effective 12/31/2008).
- it requires agencies to assign tracking numbers to FOIA requests that take longer than 10 days, and to provide systems determining the status of a request.
- it codifies and defines annual reporting requirements for each agency's FOIA program.
- it specifically addresses data sources used to generate reports; "shall make the raw statistical data used in its reports available electronically ..."
- it redefines the definition of an agency "record" to include information held for an agency by a government contractor.
- it establishes an Office of Government Information Services (OGIS) which will offer mediation services to resolve disputes as non-exclusive alternative to litigation.
- it requires agencies to make recommendations personnel matters related to FOIA such as whether FOIA performance should be used as a merit factor.
- it requires agencies to specify the specific exemption for each deletion or redaction in disclosed documents.

=== 2009 executive order permitting retroactive classification ===
On December 29, 2009, President Barack Obama issued Executive Order 13526, which allows the government to classify certain specific types of information relevant to national security after it has been requested. That is, a request for information that meets the criteria for availability under FOIA can still be denied if the government determines that the information should have been classified, and unavailable. It also sets a timeline for automatic declassification of old information that is not specifically identified as requiring continued secrecy.

=== 2010 repeal of FOIA amendments in Wall Street reform act ===
The Dodd–Frank Wall Street Reform and Consumer Protection Act, signed into law in July 2010, included provisions in section 929I that shielded the Securities and Exchange Commission (SEC) from requests under the Freedom of Information Act. The provisions were initially motivated out of concern that the FOIA would hinder SEC investigations that involved trade secrets of financial companies, including "watch lists" they gathered about other companies, trading records of investment managers, and "trading algorithms" used by investment firms.

In September 2010, the 111th Congress passed an act repealing those provisions. The act was introduced in the Senate on August 5, 2010 as S.3717 and given the name "A bill to amend the Securities Exchange Act of 1934, the Investment Company Act of 1940, and the Investment Advisers Act of 1940 to provide for certain disclosures under section 552 of title 5, United States Code, (commonly referred to as the Freedom of Information Act), and for other purposes."

=== 2014 proposed amendment ===
The FOIA Oversight and Implementation Act of 2014, which would amend the FOIA to speed up the response time and ease of making a "FOIA request", among other changes, passed the house unanimously but did not pass the senate.

=== 2016 FOIA Improvement Act ===
FOIA Improvement Act of 2016 was enacted into law on June 30, 2016. According to the legislation, any individual who receives an adverse determination in response to a FOIA request shall be allowed at least 90 days to file an appeal.

== Attorney General memoranda ==
Beginning in 1977 with Attorney General Griffin Bell, and continued by Attorney General William French Smith in 1981 and Attorney General Janet Reno in 1993, U.S. Department of Justice (DOJ) has announced how the executive branch should approach FOIA, its application, and DOJ's defense of agency's actions. In other words, DOJ's position on when they would defend in a FOIA suit has seesawed for about the last three decades.

=== Reno Memo ===
The Reno Memo established a "presumption" in favor of disclosure by providing that "it shall be the policy of the Department of Justice to defend the assertion of a FOIA exemption only in those cases where the agency reasonably foresees that disclosure would be harmful to an interest protected by that exemption". It encouraged all government agencies to review FOIA requests in a manner most favorable to openness and to release information, even though it might fall within one of the nine exemption categories, if no "foreseeable harm" would result from the disclosure. The goal was to achieve the "maximum responsible disclosure".

=== Ashcroft Memo ===
On October 12, 2001, Attorney General John Ashcroft issued a policy memorandum on FOIA to all federal executive agencies. The AG declared the Department of Justice (DOJ) would defend agencies' decisions to withhold documents from a FOIA requester under one of the statute's exemptions "unless they lack a sound legal basis or present an unwarranted risk of adverse impact on the ability of other agencies to protect other important records".

The Ashcroft Memorandum reversed the Reno standard. Agencies were told that in making discretionary FOIA decisions they should carefully consider the fundamental values behind the exemptions—national security, privacy, government's interests, etc.—and to lean in their favor whenever possible. The Ashcroft Memo with its "sound legal basis" standard encouraged (or at least seemed to support) greater use of FOIA exemptions by federal agency personnel.

=== AG Holder Memo ===
The Ashcroft Memo was rescinded by Attorney General Eric Holder on March 14, 2009. The AG Holder Memo appears to have reinstated the Reno Memo standard and extends the policy. The policy of the executive branch is to be open, responsive, transparent, and accountable. The current memo encourages the maximum disclosure possible in discretionary exemptions and to, whenever possible, reasonably segregate exempt information and release the rest.

== Notable cases ==
A major issue in released documentation is government "redaction" of certain passages deemed applicable to the Exemption section of the FOIA. Federal Bureau of Investigation (FBI) officers in charge of responding to FOIA requests "so heavily redacted the released records as to preclude needed research." This has also brought into question just how one can verify that they have been given complete records in response to a request.

=== J. Edgar Hoover ===
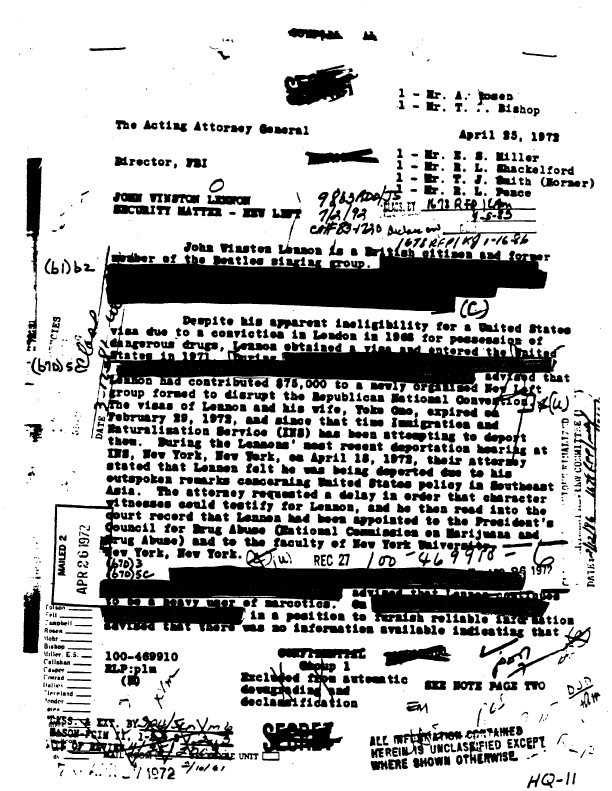
Freedom of Information Act requests have led to the release of information such as this letter by J. Edgar Hoover about surveillance of ex-Beatle John Lennon. A 25-year battle by historian Jon Wiener based on FOIA, with the assistance of lawyers from the ACLU, eventually resulted in the release of documents like this one.

This trend of unwillingness to release records was especially evident in the process of making the FBI files on J. Edgar Hoover public. Of the 164 files and about eighteen thousand pages collected by the FBI, two-thirds were withheld from Athan G. Theoharis, most notably one entire folder entitled the "White House Security Survey". Despite finding out that the Truman Library had an accessible file which documented all the reports of this folder, the FBI and Office of Information and Privacy put forth "stony resistance" to the FOIA appeal process.

=== Department of Justice v. Landano murder trial ===
A murder trial decided in 1993, Department of Justice v. Landano, 508 U.S. 165 (1993), involved what was alleged to be a felony murder committed during a group burglary by defendant Landano. Justice Sandra Day O'Connor wrote the unanimous opinion. "In an effort to support his claim in subsequent state court proceedings that the prosecution violated Brady v. Maryland, 373 U.S. 83 (1963), by withholding material exculpatory evidence, he filed Freedom of Information Act (FOIA) requests with the FBI for information it had compiled in connection with the murder investigation."

In defense, the FBI put forth a claim that the redacted sections of the documents requested were withheld in accordance with FOIA regulations protecting the identity of informants who gave information regarding case details. However, O'Connor ruled that those who supplied information had no need to remain anonymous in the court setting. "To the extent that the Government's proof may compromise legitimate interests, the Government still can attempt to meet its burden with in camera affidavits." The court thus remanded the case to the Circuit Courts and rejected the FBI's claim of confidentiality as being a valid reason to withhold information.

"While most individual sources may expect confidentiality, the Government offers no explanation, other than administrative ease, why that expectation always should be presumed." Thus, when Theoharis and company were in the middle of fighting in court to obtain J. Edgar Hoover files, they may well have benefited from Landano and also Janet Reno's assertions of the government's need for "greater openness" and "discretionary releases" in 1993.

=== Iran–Contra affair e-mails ===
In the case of Scott Armstrong v. Executive Office of the President, et al., the White House used the PROFS computer communications software. With encryption designed for secure messaging, PROFS notes concerning the Iran–Contra affair (arms-for-hostages) under the Reagan Administration were insulated. However, they were also backed up and transferred to paper memos. The National Security Council, on the eve of President George H. W. Bush's inauguration, planned to destroy these records. The National Security Archive, Armstrong's association for the preservation of government historical documents, obtained an injunction in Federal District Court against the head, John Fawcett, of the National Archives and Records Administration and the National Security Council's purging of PROFS records. A Temporary Restraining Order was approved by Senior U.S. District Court Judge Barrington D. Parker. Suit was filed at District Court under Judge Richey, who upheld the injunction of PROFS records.

Richey gave a further injunction to prevent a purging of the George H.W. Bush's administration's records as well. On counts of leaving the White House clean for the new Clinton Administration, the Bush group appealed but was denied its request. Finally, the Clinton Administration appealed to the U.S. Court of Appeals, stating that the National Security Council was not truly an agency but a group of aides to the President and thus not subject to FOIA regulations. Under the Presidential Records Act, "FOIA requests for NSC [could] not be filed until five years after the president ha[d] left office ... or twelve years if the records [were] classified." The Clinton administration won, and the National Security Archive was not granted a writ of certiorari by the Supreme Court on these grounds. According to Scott Armstrong, taking into account labor and material costs, the three presidential administrations spent almost $9.3 million on contesting the National Security Archive FOIA requests for PROFS e-mail records.

=== Secret e-mail accounts and abusive fees ===
In 2013, the Associated Press uncovered several federal agencies where staff regularly used fictitious identities and secret or unlisted email accounts to conduct government business. The use of these email accounts stymied FOIA requests. In some cases, the government demanded exorbitant (greater than $1 million) fees for records that appeals showed should be available for minimal cost.

== Processing time ==
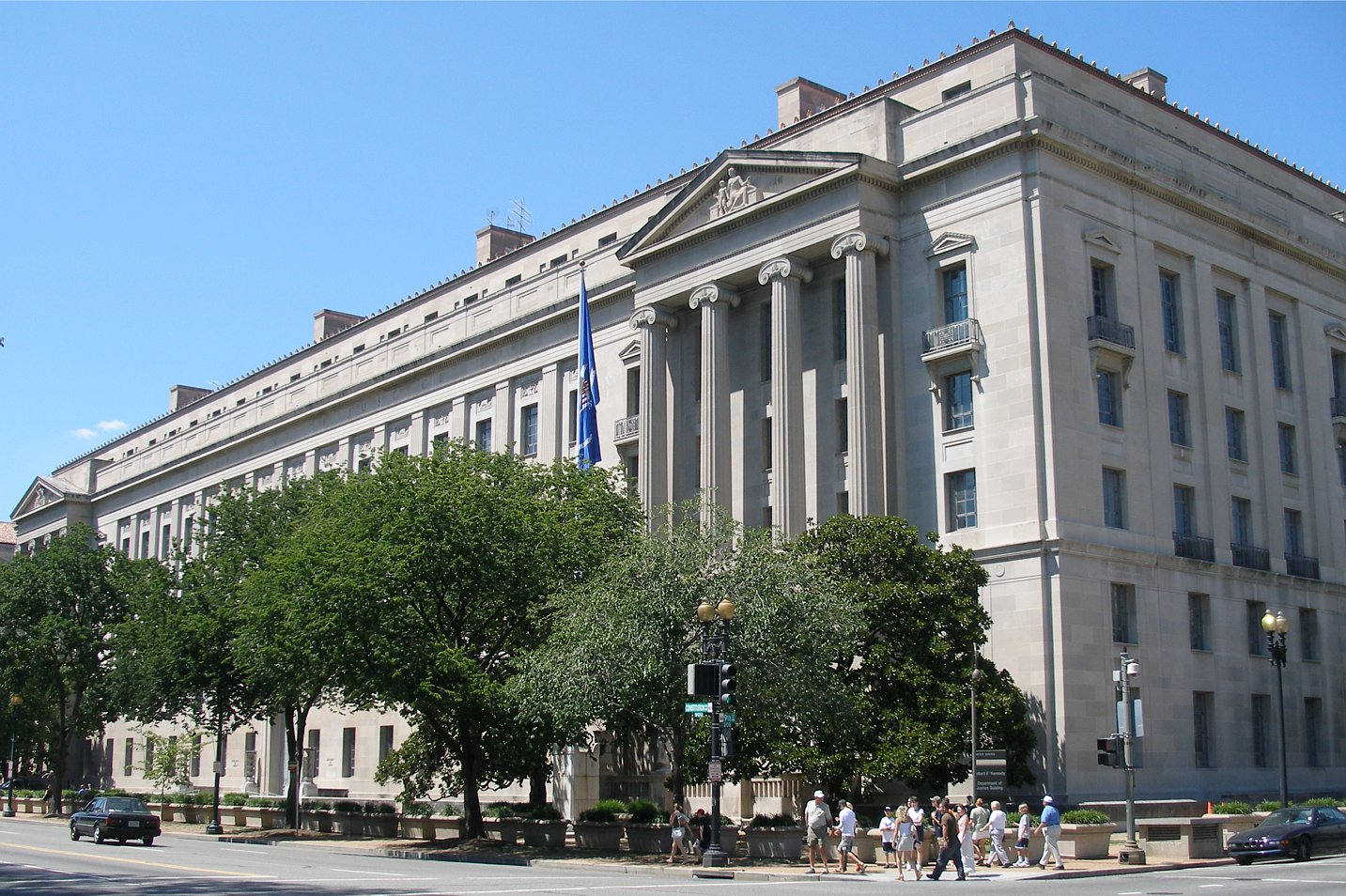
U.S. Department of Justice headquarters

The act contains a provision legally requiring agencies to respond to FOIA requests within 20 days, but for two main reasons, many agencies rarely meet this requirement. First, the task of screening requests for sensitive or classified information is often arduous and lengthy at agencies like the FBI and the CIA. Second, congressional funding for agency staff to handle FOIA requests is usually far less than the necessary amount to hire sufficient employees. As a result, parties who request information under FOIA often end up filing lawsuits in federal court seeking judicial orders forcing the agencies to comply with their FOIA requests.

The first major case of this type was the 1976 case Open America v. Watergate Special Prosecution Force, in which Open America had filed a FOIA request with the U.S. Attorney General and the FBI requesting copies of all their documents relating to the role of former FBI Director L. Patrick Gray in the Watergate scandal. The FBI had over 5,000 pending FOIA requests at the time and did not respond within the statutory 20-day limit. Open America sued in the U.S. District Court for the District of Columbia, and the court issued an order commanding the FBI to either immediately comply with or deny Open America's request. The government appealed to the U.S. Court of Appeals for the D.C. Circuit, which found that FOIA requests could be categorized into "simple" and "difficult" requests, and that although Open America's request was "difficult", the FBI had been using "due diligence" in responding to it. The court held that because there was no pressing urgency to Open America's request, its lawsuit did not move it to the head of the queue, and it would have to wait its turn. This legal reasoning and holding has been adopted by all other American circuits, though courts continue to complain that FOIA request delays are too long. In the 1983 case McGehee v. CIA the District of Columbia Circuit Court of Appeals stated:

The Freedom of Information Act nevertheless imposes on the courts the responsibility to ensure that agencies comply with their obligation to "make ... records promptly available to any person" who requests them unless a refusal to do so is justified by one of the Act's specific, exclusive exemptions. Especially where, as here, an agency's responses to a request for information have been tardy and grudging, courts should be sure they do not abdicate their own duty.

In 2015, the Center for Effective Government analyzed 15 federal agencies which receive the most FOIA requests in-depth. The organization used a scale considering three factors: the clarity of agency rules regarding FOIA requests, quality or 'friendliness' of an agency's FOIA webpage, and the timely, complete manner of processing requests. With this metric, it concluded that federal agencies are struggling to implement public disclosure rules. Using 2012 and 2013 data, the most recent years available, ten of the 15 did not earn satisfactory overall grades, scoring less than 70 out of a possible 100 points. Eight of the ten earned Ds, including the Department of Homeland Security (69 percent), Department of Transportation (68 percent), United States Department of the Treasury (Treasury) (68 percent), the Environmental Protection Agency (EPA) (67 percent), the United States Department of Labor (63 percent), the United States Department of Veterans Affairs (64 percent), the United States Department of Defense (61 percent), the Securities and Exchange Commission (61 percent). The Department of Health and Human Services and the Department of State earned an F. The State Department's score (37 percent) was dismal due to its extremely low processing score of 23 percent, which was completely out of line with any other agency's performance. Scores of five agencies, the Equal Employment Opportunity Commission, the Department of Health and Human Services, the SEC, the DOJ, and the EPA, even decreased marginally.

== Implementation by government agencies ==
Starting in 2012, the Federal government job title Government Information Specialist was established for professionals focused on FOIA or privacy matters. Agencies sometimes track or process FOIA requests on websites or systems shared across organizations, such as FOIA.gov and eFOIA.

== See also ==
- Commission on Protecting and Reducing Government Secrecy
- Federal Records Act
- Freedom of information laws by country
- Glomar response
- FOIA Exemption 3 Statutes
- Mosaic theory (US law)
- MuckRock
