= Government in the Sunshine Act =

Federal transparency law in the US

- Long title: An Act to provide that meetings of Government agencies shall be open to the public, and for other purposes.
- Enacted by: the 94th United States Congress
- Effective: September 13, 1976

Citations
- Public law: 94-409
- Statutes at Large: 90 Stat. 1241

Codification
- Acts amended: Freedom of Information Act
- Titles amended: 5 U.S.C.: Government Organization and Employees
- U.S.C. sections created: 5 U.S.C. ch. 5, subch. II § 552b

Legislative history
- Introduced in the Senate as S. 5 by Lawton Chiles (D–FL) on January 15, 1975; Committee consideration by Senate Government Operations, Senate Judiciary, Senate Rules and Administration, House Government Operations; Passed the Senate on November 6, 1975 (94–0); Passed the House on July 28, 1976 (391–0, in lieu of H.R. 11656); Reported by the joint conference committee on August 26, 1976; agreed to by the House on August 31, 1976 (384–0) and by the Senate on August 31, 1976 (agreed); Signed into law by President Gerald Ford on September 13, 1976

The Government in the Sunshine Act (Pub. L. 94–409, 90 Stat. 1241, enacted September 13, 1976, 5 U.S.C. § 552b) is a U.S. law passed in 1976 that affects the operations of the federal government, Congress, federal commissions, and other legally constituted federal bodies. It is one of a number of Freedom of Information Acts, intended to create greater transparency in government.

== Effect ==
"The Sunshine Act provides, with ten specified exemptions, that 'every portion of every meeting of an agency shall be open to public observation.' 5 U.S.C. 552b(b) It imposes procedural requirements to ensure, inter alia [among other things], that advance notice is given to the public before agency meetings take place. It also imposes procedural requirements an agency must follow before determining that one of the ten exemptions from the openness requirement applies. However, neither the openness requirement, nor the related procedural requirements, are triggered unless the governmental entity at issue is an 'agency,' and unless the gathering in question is a 'meeting' of the agency." Natural Resources Defense Council, Inc., v. Nuclear Regulatory Commission, 216 F.3d 1180, 1182 (D.C. Cir. 2000).

== Definitions and exceptions ==
The statute defines a "meeting" as "the deliberations of at least the number of individual agency members required to take action on behalf of the agency where such deliberations determine or result in the joint conduct or disposition of official agency business". 552b(a)(2).

The statute defines "agency" to include "any agency ... headed by a collegial body composed of two or more individual members ... and any subdivision thereof authorized to act on behalf of the agency". 552b(a)(1).

The Sunshine Act enumerates ten specific exemptions for categories of information that need not be disclosed. In summary these are:

- information relating to national defense;
- related solely to internal personnel rules and practices;
- matters specifically protected by law;
- trade secrets or privileged/confidential commercial information;
- matters censuring or accusing a person of a crime;
- information where disclosure would constitute a breach of privacy;
- related to investigatory records where the information would harm the proceedings;
- information for the use of an agency responsible for the regulation or supervision of financial institutions;
- which would lead to financial speculation or endanger the stability of any financial institution; or
- related to the agency's participation in legal proceedings.

== Purpose ==
The legislative intent of the Act is as follows: "The basic premise of the sunshine legislation is that, in the words of federalist No. 49, 'the people are the only legitimate foundation of power, and it is from them that the constitutional charter ... is derived.' Government is and should be the servant of the people, and it should be fully accountable to them for the actions which it supposedly takes on their behalf." (U.S.C.C.A.N. 2183, 2186).

== See also ==
- Federal Advisory Committee Act (1974)
- Freedom of Information Act (United States) (1966)
- Open-source governance
