= FOIA Oversight and Implementation Act of 2014 =

2014 United States e-government law

- Long title: To amend section 552 of title 5, United States Code (commonly known as the Freedom of Information Act), to provide for greater public access to information, and for other purposes.
- Acronyms (colloquial): FOIA Act
- Nicknames: Previously called the FOIA Oversight and Implementation Act of 2013
- Announced in: the 113th United States Congress
- Sponsored by: Rep. Darrell E. Issa (R, CA-49)
- Number of co-sponsors: 2

Codification
- Acts affected: Freedom of Information Act, Emergency Economic Stabilization Act of 2008
- U.S.C. sections affected: 5 U.S.C. § 552, 5 U.S.C. § 75, 12 U.S.C. § 5211 et seq.
- Agencies affected: United States Congress, Government Accountability Office, Executive Office of the President, Office of Management and Budget, United States Department of Justice, General Services Administration, National Archives and Records Administration

Legislative history
- Introduced in the House as H.R. 1211 by Rep. Darrell E. Issa (R, CA-49) on March 15, 2013; Committee consideration by United States House Committee on Oversight and Government Reform; Passed the House on February 25, 2014 (Roll Call Vote 63: 410-0)

The FOIA Oversight and Implementation Act of 2014 (H.R. 1211) is a bill that would amend the Freedom of Information Act in order to make it easier and faster to request and receive information. The bill would require the Office of Management and Budget to create a single FOIA website for people to use to make FOIA requests and check on the status of their request. The bill would also create a Chief FOIA Officers Council charged with reviewing compliance and recommending improvements. This bill would also require the federal agency to release the information it disclosed to the person who requested it publicly afterwards.

The bill was introduced in the United States House of Representatives during the 113th United States Congress.

== Background ==
The Freedom of Information Act (FOIA), 5 U.S.C. § 552, is a federal freedom of information law that allows for the full or partial disclosure of previously unreleased information and documents controlled by the United States government. The Act defines agency records subject to disclosure, outlines mandatory disclosure procedures and grants nine exemptions to the statute. It was originally signed into law by President Lyndon B. Johnson, despite his misgivings, on July 4, 1966, and went into effect the following year.

The existing FOIA request process can take weeks or even months to complete and often requires those making a request to deal with multiple agencies and offices. There are millions of FOIA requests that get completed every year. Existing FOIA requests have been criticized as "daunting".

== Provisions of the bill ==
This summary is based largely on the summary provided by the Congressional Research Service, a public domain source.

The FOIA Oversight and Implementation Act of 2014 or the FOIA Act would amend the Freedom of Information Act (FOIA) to:

- require federal agencies to make public information disclosed under FOIA available in an electronic, publicly accessible format;
- require the Office of Management and Budget (OMB) to ensure the existence and operation of a single, free website (i.e., FOIAonline) for submitting requests for records and receiving automated information about the status of a FOIA request;
- revise the standard for exempting information under FOIA to require foreseeable harm from disclosure;
- expand the functions and reporting requirements of the Office of Government Information Services;
- expand the rights of individuals making a FOIA request to appeal an adverse determination;
- require agencies to determine whether the release of agency records would contribute significantly to public understanding of the operations or activities of government;
- require agencies to document additional search or duplication fees;
- require agencies to submit annual FOIA reports to the Director of the Office of Government Information Services, in addition to the Attorney General;
- expand the duties of the Chief FOIA Officer of each agency to require an annual compliance review of FOIA requirements;
- establish the Chief FOIA Officers Council to develop recommendations for increasing compliance with FOIA requirements; and
- require each agency to update its FOIA regulations within 180 days of the enactment of this Act.

The bill would also require: (1) OMB to establish a three-year pilot program to review the benefits of FOIAonline (the electronic online portal FOIAonline.regulations.gov) to process requests and release information as required by FOIA, (2) OMB to establish a plan to evaluate FOIAonline at no less than three agencies that have not previously participated in FOIAonline, and (3) the head of each federal agency participating in the pilot program to report to Congress on the impact of the program on agency processes under FOIA and whether the agency will continue to participate in FOIAonline.

The bill would also require the Inspector General of each federal agency to: (1) periodically review compliance with FOIA disclosure requirements, including the timely processing of requests, assessment of fees and fee waivers, and the use of disclosure exemptions; and (2) make recommendations to the head of an agency, including recommendations for disciplinary action. The bill would make the improper withholding of information under FOIA a basis for disciplinary action.

== Congressional Budget Office report ==
This summary is based largely on the summary provided by the Congressional Budget Office, as ordered reported by the House Committee on Oversight and Government Reform on March 20, 2013. This is a public domain source.

H.R. 1211 would amend the Freedom of Information Act (FOIA). FOIA generally allows any person to obtain federal agency records. Specifically, the legislation would require the Office of Management and Budget (OMB) to establish a single FOIA website for making requests and checking on the status of those requests; establish a Chief FOIA Officers Council to review compliance with the act and to recommend improvements; and require additional reports from the National Archives and Records Administration (NARA) and other agencies.

The Congressional Budget Office (CBO) estimates that implementing H.R. 1211 would cost $20 million over the 2014-2018 period, assuming appropriation of the necessary amounts. The legislation also could affect direct spending by agencies not funded through annual appropriations (such as the Tennessee Valley Authority). Therefore, pay-as-you-go procedures apply. CBO estimates, however, that any net increase in spending by those agencies would not be significant. Enacting the bill would not affect revenues.

H.R. 1211 contains no intergovernmental or private-sector mandates as defined in the Unfunded Mandates Reform Act (UMRA) and would not affect the budgets of state, local, or tribal governments.

== Procedural history ==
The FOIA Oversight and Implementation Act of 2014 was introduced into the United States House of Representatives on March 15, 2013, by Rep. Darrell E. Issa (R, CA-49). It was referred to the United States House Committee on Oversight and Government Reform. It was reported (amended) alongside House Report 113-155 on July 16, 2013. House Majority Leader Eric Cantor announced on February 21, 2014, that the bill would be considered under a suspension of the rules on February 25, 2014. On February 25, 2014, the House voted in Roll Call Vote 63 to pass the bill 410–0, but was defeated on Dec. 11, 2014, when a nearly identical version of the measure called FOIA Improvement Act (S.R. 2520; 113th Congress) was tabled by Speaker John Boehner and "the House of Representatives failed to hold a vote on the plan before adjourning for the year."

== Debate and discussion ==
According to Hadas Gold of Politico, the bill "puts into action" a pre-existing executive memo from President Barack Obama that ordered all federal agencies to "have a 'presumption of disclosure' to all FOIA decisions."

The Washington Examiner editorial board called FOIA "the essential building block in making sure every citizen has access to all federal documents." They believe that the law makes "it possible for taxpayers to know things that are essential to their ability to hold public officials accountable." The editorial board believes that the most important reforms in the FOIA Oversight and Implementation Act of 2014 are the creation of a single portal website, increased power and independence for the Office of Government Information Services, and the creation of the Open Government Advisory Committee in the National Archives and Records administration.

Rep. Issa argued in favor of the bill because it "shifts the burden of proof from the public requestor seeking information about a government agency…to the government being open and transparent unless it has a good reason to withhold."

== See also ==
- List of bills in the 113th United States Congress
- Freedom of information in the United States
- Classified information in the United States
