= Senior Executive Service Accountability Act =

2014 legislation in the United States

- Long title: To amend title 5, United States Code, to enhance accountability within the Senior Executive Service, and for other purposes.
- Announced in: the 113th United States Congress
- Sponsored by: Rep. Tim Walberg (R, MI-7)
- Number of co-sponsors: 1

Codification
- U.S.C. sections affected: 5 U.S.C. § 3594, 5 U.S.C. § 3393, 5 U.S.C. § 3593, 5 U.S.C. § 7543, 5 U.S.C. ch. 75, and others.
- Agencies affected: Merit Systems Protection Board, U.S. Court of Appeals for the Federal Circuit, Office of Personnel Management

Legislative history
- Introduced in the House as H.R. 5169 by Rep. Tim Walberg (R, MI-7) on July 23, 2014; Committee consideration by United States House Committee on Oversight and Government Reform; Passed the House on September 16, 2014 (voice vote)

The Senior Executive Service Accountability Act (H.R. 5169) is a bill that would make it less difficult to fire or suspend members of the Senior Executive Service (SES).

The bill was introduced into the United States House of Representatives during the 113th United States Congress.

== Provisions of the bill ==
This summary is based largely on the summary provided by the Congressional Research Service, a public domain source.

The Senior Executive Service Accountability Act would require each federal agency to include in its biennial request to the Office of Personnel Management (OPM) for a specific number of Senior Executive Service (SES) positions a justification for each position and the specific result expected from each such position.

The bill would extend from one year to two years the probationary period for SES employees.

The bill would make SES employees subject to suspensions for cause for 14 days or less without duties and pay. Expands the grounds for suspension or termination of an SES employee to include such cause as would promote the efficiency of the Senior Executive Service. Reduces from 30 days to 15 days the notice required to employees of an adverse personnel action.

The bill would require a written description of employee performance requirements to be provided to an SES employee not later than 30 calendar days before each rating period.

The bill would require SES employees who receive written notice of removal from the civil service to take mandatory annual leave.

== Congressional Budget Office report ==
This summary is based largely on the summary provided by the Congressional Budget Office, as ordered reported by the House Committee on Oversight and Government Reform on July 24, 2014. This is a public domain source.

The Congressional Budget Office (CBO) estimates that implementing H.R. 5169 would not have a significant impact on federal spending. Enacting the bill could affect revenues; therefore, pay-as-you-go procedures apply. However, CBO estimates that any such effects would be insignificant over the next ten years.

H.R. 5169 would make several changes to the conditions of employment for members of the Senior Executive Service (SES). In particular, the bill would change the procedures for removing SES employees for misconduct or underperformance, and modify the rules for providing salary and paid time off for those removed. For example, H.R. 5169 would eliminate the ability of former SES members removed for underperformance to keep their SES pay if demoted to a civil service position (under current law, they are allowed to continue being paid at the SES level).

Implementing this bill would lead to lower discretionary spending for salaries and expenses for those removed from the SES for misconduct or underperformance. CBO estimates that the spending decrease would be small because so few employees would likely be affected. According to the Office of Personnel Management, only 5 SES employees over the past five years would have met the criteria for salary adjustments set forth in this bill. Because some affected employees would receive a reduced salary, their retirement contributions would also be slightly reduced, resulting in a reduction in revenues. CBO estimates that those reductions also would not be significant.

H.R. 5169 contains no intergovernmental or private-sector mandates as defined in the Unfunded Mandates Reform Act and would impose no costs on state, local, or tribal governments.

== Procedural history ==
The Senior Executive Service Accountability Act was introduced into the United States House of Representatives on July 23, 2014 by Rep. Tim Walberg (R, MI-7). The bill was referred to the United States House Committee on Oversight and Government Reform. On September 16, 2014, the House voted to pass the bill in a voice vote.

== Debate and discussion ==
The Senior Executives Association (SEA) opposed the bill, calling it "a solution in search of a problem." SEA President Carol Bonosaro said that "what is not needed are piecemeal efforts aimed at making it easier to fire Senior Executives based on faulty perceptions that there are not tools already available to hold them accountable for poor performance."

== See also ==
- List of bills in the 113th United States Congress
