= Deal v. United States =

- Supreme Court of the United States

Argued March 1, 1993 Decided May 17, 1993
- Full case name: Thomas Lee Deal, Petitioner v. United States
- Docket no.: 91-8199
- Citations: 508 U.S. 129 (more)
- Decision: Opinion

Case history
- Prior: Judgment of conviction entered. United States v. Deal, No. H-90-315-S (N.D. Tex. 1991).; Affirmed. 954 F. 2d 262 (5th Cir. 1992).; Cert. granted. 506 U. S. 814 (1992).

Questions presented
- Whether the petitioner's Fifth Amendment Due Process rights were violated by not applying the rule of lenity to the “second or subsequent" language in the Armed Career Criminal Act

Holding
- A first-time offender could accrue multiple convictions and trigger penalties "[i]n the case of his second or subsequent conviction" under the Armed Career Criminal Act.

Court membership
- Chief Justice William Rehnquist Associate Justices Byron White · Harry Blackmun; John P. Stevens · Sandra Day O'Connor; Antonin Scalia · Anthony Kennedy; David Souter · Clarence Thomas

Case opinions
- Majority: Scalia, joined by Rehnquist, White, Kennedy, Souter, Thomas
- Dissent: Stevens, joined by Blackmun, O'Connor

Laws applied
- 18 U.S.C. § 924(c)(1)
- Superseded by
- First Step Act

Deal v. United States, 508 U.S. 129 (1993), was a United States Supreme Court case in which the court held that a first-time offender could accrue multiple convictions and trigger penalties "[i]n the case of his second or subsequent conviction" under the Armed Career Criminal Act, specifically 18 U.S.C. § 924(c)(1), a provision of the Armed Career Criminal Act. The court interpreted the statute in favor of the state without applying the rule of lenity. Because of this case, prosecutors designed cases to trigger long sentences for first-time offenders with multiple mandatory minimums applied.

== Background ==
=== Legal background ===
In 1984, Congress passed the Armed Career Criminal Act (ACCA). As of 1990, § 924(c) of the ACCA read as follows:

"Whoever, during and in relation to any crime of violence. . . uses or carries a firearm, shall, in addition to the punishment provided for such crime of violence.. ., be sentenced to imprisonment for five years. . . . In the case of his second or subsequent conviction under this subsection, such person shall be sentenced to imprisonment for twenty years[.]"

=== Factual background ===
On September 14, 1990, Deal was charged by superseding indictment in the Northern District of Texas with thirteen crimes. Six counts charged Deal with committing six separate bank robberies:

- Count 1: January 24, 1990, an Ameriway Bank branch in Houston, for $7,214;
- Count 3: February 23, 1990, an Ameriway Bank branch in Houston, for $8,000;
- Count 5: March 1, 1990, a Charter Bank branch in Houston, for $6,978;
- Count 7: March 5, 1990, a Charter Bank branch in Houston, for $5,916;
- Count 9: March 13, 1990, a First Texas Bank branch in Houston, for $17,295; and
- Count 11: April 12, 1990, a Charter Bank Branch in Houston, for $7,037.

In each bank robbery, Deal used a firearm. Counts 2, 4, 6, 8, 10, and 12 charged Deal with using and possessing a firearm during or in relation to the bank robberies charged in Counts 1, 3, 5, 7, 9, and 11, respectively. Count 13 charged Deal with being a felon in possession of a firearm, in violation of 18 U.S.C. § 922(g)(1).

The trial began on January 22, 1991. The following day, Deal was found guilty on all thirteen counts of the superseding indictment. Sentencing took place on April 12, 1991. At sentencing, an issue arose regarding how to construe ACCA's reference to a defendant's "second or subsequent" § 924(c) conviction. The probation office considered Deal's five convictions on Counts 4, 6, 8, 10, and 12 to be "second or subsequent" convictions for the purposes of ACCA, despite their arising from the same indictment as Count 2, which resulted in Deal's first § 924(c) conviction. Over Deal's objection, the sentencing court adopted the recommendation of the probation office.

For his bank robbery convictions, Deal was ultimately sentenced to 14 years in prison. For his § 922(g)(1) conviction, he was sentenced to 10 years in prison, to run concurrently with his bank robbery sentences, for a subtotal of 14 years. For his first § 924(c) conviction (Count 2), he was sentenced to 5 years to run consecutively to all prior sentences, for a subtotal of 19 years. For the five remaining § 924(c) convictions (even-numbered Counts 4-12), he was sentenced to 20 years each, to run consecutively to each other (i.e., 100 years), and consecutive to all prior sentences, for a grand total of 119 years in prison. The United States Court of Appeals for the Fifth Circuit affirmed on March 5, 1992.

== Supreme Court ==
On May 7, 1992, Deal petitioned the Supreme Court for a writ of certiorari. On October 5, 1992, the Court granted review. Oral arguments were heard on March 1, 1993. Dola J. Young argued the case on behalf of Deal. Miguel A. Estrada argued the case on behalf of the United States. The Court's opinions were issued on May 17, 1993.

Justice Scalia authored the majority opinion, in which Justices Rehnquist, White, Kennedy, Souter, and Thomas joined, in which the judgment of the Fifth Circuit was affirmed. The Court held that § 924(c)(1)'s reference to a "conviction" referred to the jury's finding of guilt, rather than the time at which a judgment of conviction was entered against Deal.

Justice Stevens authored a dissenting opinion, in which Justices Blackmun and O'Connor joined. The dissent concluded that "second or subsequent conviction" referred to a conviction "for an offense committed after an earlier conviction has become final." Alternatively, the dissent concluded that the rule of lenity counseled against the majority's reading.

== Subsequent events ==
In 1998, Congress amended 18 U.S.C. 924(c)(1) by, among other things, increasing the minimum sentence for a second or subsequent conviction to 25 years under 18 U.S.C. 924(c)(1)(C) in the newly amended version of the statute.

On December 21, 2018, President Donald Trump signed into law the First Step Act, a bipartisan criminal justice bill. Section 403 of the First Step Act was enacted to overrule Deal v. United States, and prospectively eliminate § 924(c)'s "stacking" effect as to first-time offenders:

SEC. 403. CLARIFICATION OF SECTION 924(c) OF TITLE 18, UNITED STATES CODE.

(a) IN GENERAL.—Section 924(c)(1)(C) of title 18, United States Code, is amended, in the matter preceding clause (i), by striking ‘‘second or subsequent conviction under this subsection’’ and inserting ‘‘violation of this subsection that occurs after a prior conviction under this subsection has become final’’.
(b) APPLICABILITY TO PENDING CASES.—This section, and the amendments made by this section, shall apply to any offense that was committed before the date of enactment of this Act, if a sentence for the offense has not been imposed as of such date of enactment.

— Pub. L. 115-391, 132 Stat. 5194, 5221-5222, December 21, 2018.

On February 25, 2019, Deal filed a motion in the Supreme Court for leave to file a petition for rehearing in light of the First Step Act's changes to sentencing under § 924(c). On March 25, the motion was denied.
