= Antoine v. Byers & Anderson, Inc. =

- Supreme Court of the United States

Decided June 7, 1993
- Full case name: Antoine v. Byers & Anderson, Inc.
- Citations: 508 U.S. 429 (more)

Holding
- A court reporter is not absolutely immune from damages liability for failing to produce a transcript of a federal criminal trial.

Court membership
- Chief Justice William Rehnquist Associate Justices Byron White · Harry Blackmun; John P. Stevens · Sandra Day O'Connor; Antonin Scalia · Anthony Kennedy; David Souter · Clarence Thomas

Case opinion
- Majority: Stevens, joined by unanimous

Antoine v. Byers & Anderson, Inc., 508 U.S. 429 (1993), was a United States Supreme Court case in which the Court held that a court reporter is not absolutely immune from damages liability for failing to produce a transcript of a federal criminal trial.
