= Wisconsin v. Mitchell =

- Supreme Court of the United States

Argued April 21, 1993 Decided June 11, 1993
- Full case name: Wisconsin v. Todd Mitchell
- Citations: 508 U.S. 476 (more) 113 S. Ct. 2194; 124 L. Ed. 2d 436; 1993 U.S. LEXIS 4024; 61 U.S.L.W. 4575; 21 Media L. Rep. 1520; 93 Cal. Daily Op. Service 4314; 93 Daily Journal DAR 7353

Case history
- Prior: Defendant convicted, Kenosha County Circuit Court; affirmed, 473 N.W.2d 1 (Wis. App. 1991); reversed, 485 N.W.2d 807 (Wis. 1992); cert. granted, 506 U.S. 1033 (1992)
- Subsequent: On remand, affirmed, 504 N.W.2d 610 (Wis. 1993)

Holding
- Enhanced sentencing for bias-motivated crimes does not violate a defendant's First Amendment rights. Wisconsin Supreme Court reversed and remanded.

Court membership
- Chief Justice William Rehnquist Associate Justices Byron White · Harry Blackmun; John P. Stevens · Sandra Day O'Connor; Antonin Scalia · Anthony Kennedy; David Souter · Clarence Thomas

Case opinion
- Majority: Rehnquist, joined by unanimous

Laws applied
- U.S. Const. amend. I; Wis. Stat. § 939.645

Wisconsin v. Mitchell, 508 U.S. 476 (1993), was a case in which the United States Supreme Court held that enhanced penalties for hate crimes do not violate criminal defendants' First Amendment rights. It was a landmark precedent pertaining to First Amendment free speech arguments for hate crime legislation. In effect, the Court ruled that a state may consider whether a crime was committed or initially considered due to an intended victim's status in a protected class.

== Background facts ==
The respondent, Todd Mitchell, was with a group of other African American individuals, in an apartment complex in Kenosha, Wisconsin. Members of this group were discussing the film Mississippi Burning; in particular, a scene in which a white man beat a young black boy who was praying. According to the facts, undisputed by the respondent, in the briefs filed in lower courts, the group had discussed the scene indoors while drinking, and later moved outside the apartment complex. Outside, they were joined by Mitchell and further discussed the scene. Seeing that everyone was enraged, Mitchell asked the group, "Do you all feel hyped up to move on some white peoples?"

Looking across the street, Mitchell and the group spotted Gregory Reddick, a white fourteen-year old, walking home from a nearby pizza parlor. Mitchell reportedly turned to the group and remarked, "You all want to fuck somebody up? There goes a white boy; go get him." Mitchell counted to three and then pointed left and right, signaling that they should encircle him. Ten of them then took off after Reddick, most running directly at him. One person in the group kicked Reddick, knocking him to the ground. Several attackers then surrounded Reddick. They kicked, punched and stomped on him for over five minutes. The beating left Reddick unconscious on the ground, and one of the attackers remarked that they had killed him. Another then took Reddick's British Knights sneakers and showed them off later at his apartment complex with Mitchell. The police found Reddick unconscious a short while later. He remained in a coma for four days in the hospital; the record indicates he fully recovered from all physical injuries.

== Trial and state-level appeals ==
In a jury trial, under the Circuit Court for Kenosha County, Mitchell was convicted of aggravated battery. The maximum sentence was raised to seven years imprisonment because Mitchell had selected his target based on race. This was pursuant to a Wisconsin statute (939.645) that allowed for such an increase if it could be shown that the defendant, "[i]intentionally selects the person against whom the crime... is committed... because of the race, religion, color, disability, sexual orientation, national origin or ancestry of that person...." The Circuit Court sentenced Mitchell to four years imprisonment.

Mitchell appealed the decision of the Wisconsin Circuit Court, alleging that the Wisconsin statute unconstitutionally infringed upon his First Amendment rights. The appeal was rejected by the Wisconsin Court of Appeals, but the Wisconsin Supreme Court reversed this, arguing that the statute was a direct violation of the First Amendment, because it "punish[ed] what the legislature has deemed to be offensive thought." It rejected the State of Wisconsin's claim, that the statute only punished the "conduct" in which a victim was selected, saying that it felt the law punishes the reason the defendant selected the victim. This was an important distinction to make in constitutional law, and the Wisconsin Supreme Court invoked the United States Supreme Court's ruling in R.A.V. v. St. Paul, claiming this law criminalized, "bigoted thought with which it disagrees."

Further, the Wisconsin Supreme Court claimed that the law was also unconstitutionally over broad, reasoning that, in order to prove a person selected a victim in the prohibited manner, the state would need to introduce evidence of a person's prior speech. The court thought this would create a "chilling effect" on free speech in general, as people sought to avoid the appearance of bigotry in fear that it may be used against them in court at a later time to enhance their potential penalty. The court distinguished their opinion on this matter from anti discrimination laws, which had already been ruled constitutional, claiming that the law in question for this particular case, punished the "subjective mental process" of victim selection, whereas the anti discrimination laws upheld previously had punished "objective acts of discrimination."

The Supreme Court of the United States granted certiorari.

== Decision of the Supreme Court of the United States ==
Writing for a unanimous court, Chief Justice William Rehnquist reasoned that, in substance, Wisconsin's law served the same purpose as federal antidiscrimination law. Whereas in R.A.V. the ordinance struck down was explicitly targeted at expression, the statute in this case was directed towards conduct that was not expressive as such, but was instead directed at violence in particular.

The Court further stated that, Wisconsin was within its rights to offer sentence enhancement in bias-motivated crime because it had a compelling interest in preventing the negative secondary effects of such crimes. Among these secondary effects mentioned were the increased likelihood of a bias-motivated crime to provoke retaliation, to inflict greater emotional distress on the victim, and to incite community unrest. The Court explained that, these secondary effects were more than adequate reason for such a sentencing enhancement, especially if, as stated above, the law was not explicitly targeting beliefs or statements.

Regarding the "chilling effect" argument presented by Mitchell's side, the Court stated that it "[found] no merit in this contention." The Court determined that this rationale was far too speculative in nature to merit a genuine complaint of a statute's constitutional over breadth. Because lesser crimes such as "negligent operation of a motor vehicle" (cited in the opinion) were very unlikely to ever be racially-based, the Court stated that for this statute to be over broad one would have to consider the prospect of a citizen actively suppressing their bigoted beliefs because they believed they could be used against him or her at a trial for a serious offense such as burglary, battery, or murder.

Finally, the Court noted that it is relatively commonplace for a defendant's prior speech to be presented to the court as evidence. This is a tool in the judicial process, often serving a vital role in establishing the defendant's motive.

For the reasons listed above, the Court reversed the Wisconsin Supreme Court's decision, and remanded the case to a lower court for final proceedings.

== See also ==
- List of United States Supreme Court cases involving the First Amendment
- List of United States Supreme Court cases, volume 508
- List of United States Supreme Court cases by the Rehnquist Court
