= Nobelman v. American Savings Bank =

- Supreme Court of the United States

Argued April 19, 1993 Decided June 1, 1993
- Full case name: Leonard Nobelman, et ux., Petitioners v. American Savings Bank, et al.
- Citations: 508 U.S. 324 (more) 113 S. Ct. 2106; 124 L. Ed. 2d 228; 1993 U.S. LEXIS 3745; 61 U.S.L.W. 4531; Bankr. L. Rep. (CCH) ¶ 75,253A; 28 Collier Bankr. Cas. 2d (MB) 977; 24 Bankr. Ct. Dec. 479; 93 Cal. Daily Op. Service 3927; 7 Fla. L. Weekly Fed. S 339

Holding
- Section 1322(b)(2) prohibits a Chapter 13 debtor from relying on § 506(a) to reduce an undersecured homestead mortgage to the fair market value of the mortgaged residence.

Court membership
- Chief Justice William Rehnquist Associate Justices Byron White · Harry Blackmun; John P. Stevens · Sandra Day O'Connor; Antonin Scalia · Anthony Kennedy; David Souter · Clarence Thomas

Case opinions
- Majority: Thomas, joined by unanimous
- Concurrence: Stevens

Nobelman v. American Savings Bank, 508 U.S. 324 (1993), was a United States Supreme Court case in which the Court disallowed cram-downs (the involuntary imposition by a court of a reorganization plan over the objections of creditors in a bankruptcy proceeding) for primary residences. Michael J. Schroeder argued on behalf of the mortgage creditor, American Savings Bank.
