= Doe v. Chao =

- Supreme Court of the United States

Argued December 3, 2003 Decided February 24, 2004
- Full case name: Buck Doe v. Elaine L. Chao, Secretary of Labor
- Docket no.: 02–1377
- Citations: 540 U.S. 614 (more) 124 S. Ct. 1204; 157 L. Ed. 2d 1122; 2004 U.S. LEXIS 1622; 72 U.S.L.W. 4178; 17 Fla. L. Weekly Fed. S 132; Unemployment Ins. Rep. (CCH) ¶ 17,159B

Case history
- Prior: Summary judgment in favor of plaintiff, Doe v. Herman, No. 2:97-cv-00043, 2000 WL 34204432 (W.D. Va. July 24, 2000); reversed sub. nom., Doe v. Chao, 306 F.3d 170 (4th Cir. 2002); cert. granted, 539 U.S. 957 (2003).

Holding
- Plaintiffs must prove that some actual damages resulted from a federal agency's intentional or willful violation of the Privacy Act of 1974 in order to qualify for the statutory minimum award of $1000 provided for such a violation under that statute. Fourth Circuit affirmed.

Court membership
- Chief Justice William Rehnquist Associate Justices John P. Stevens · Sandra Day O'Connor; Antonin Scalia · Anthony Kennedy; David Souter · Clarence Thomas; Ruth Bader Ginsburg · Stephen Breyer

Case opinions
- Majority: Souter, joined by Rehnquist, O'Connor, Kennedy, Thomas; Scalia (except for one paragraph and one footnote of the opinion)
- Dissent: Ginsburg, joined by Stevens, Breyer
- Dissent: Breyer

Laws applied
- Privacy Act of 1974, 5 U.S.C. § 552a

Doe v. Chao, 540 U.S. 614 (2004), is a decision by the United States Supreme Court that interpreted the statutory damages provision of the Privacy Act of 1974.

Prior to the case, lower federal courts had split over whether plaintiffs whose rights were violated were automatically entitled to the statutory minimum damages award of $1000, or whether those plaintiffs had to prove that they had suffered at least some actual damage from the privacy breach (which would then be raised to $1000 if their actual damages were less than that).

The Court's 6–3 decision determined that the latter interpretation was correct; as a result, it will be more difficult for a plaintiff to prevail as he or she must now prove both a violation and some damages before being entitled to recovery.

This result is generally applauded by proponents of greater freedoms for the press, as a contrary result may have made government agencies more reluctant to release information out of fear of lawsuits.

== Background of the case ==
The plaintiff in the case, coal miner Buck Doe (a pseudonym), filed for benefits under the federal Black Lung Benefits Act. The Department of Labor, which ran the benefits program, required applicants to provide a Social Security number as a part of the application. The government's practice was to use the number for identification purposes, and as a result, claimants such as Doe had their Social Security numbers displayed on various legal documents and published in case reports and online legal research databases.

Doe, along with six other black lung claimants, sued the Department of Labor for violating their rights under the Privacy Act. The government conceded that it had violated the statute. At trial, Doe testified that he suffered "distress" from the release of his private information. The district court awarded Doe $1000, which was the statutory minimum amount of damages that could be awarded under the statute.

The Fourth Circuit reversed. It interpreted the statute to require a plaintiff to show some actual damages before the statutory minimum damages could be awarded. Further, it found that plaintiff's testimony about his "distress" was not legally sufficient to show that he had been damaged by the disclosure.

This decision conflicted with decisions of the First, Fifth, Ninth, Eleventh, and District of Columbia circuits, and the Supreme Court granted certiorari to resolve the dispute.

== Statutory language ==
The statutory language at issue provided that if a government agency violated the act "in a manner which was intentional or willful, the United States shall be liable to the individual in an amount equal to the sum of actual damages sustained by the individual as a result of the refusal or failure, but in no case shall a person entitled to recovery receive less than the sum of $1,000."

== Supreme Court ==
The Court, in an opinion written by Justice David Souter, agreed with the Fourth Circuit's interpretation as a matter of "straightforward textual analysis."

The Court supported its interpretation with an analysis of the history of the statute, which showed that Congress specifically removed language from the bill that explicitly would have awarded $1000 without proof of any damages. (Justice Antonin Scalia, an opponent of using legislative history in interpreting statutes, did not join this paragraph of the opinion).

=== Dissenting opinions ===
Justice Ruth Bader Ginsburg wrote a dissenting opinion, arguing that a "sensible" reading of the statutory language supported Doe's position. She also noted that reading the statute to require some proof of actual damages would have little practical effect. She noted that it would be very easy for a plaintiff to prove actual damages in a similar case merely by purchasing a credit report following the publication of his Social Security number. This small amount of damages would then be raised to $1000 by operation of the statute.

Justice Stephen Breyer also dissented, noting that the government's stated fear of large damage awards under a more permissive reading of the statute would likely not materialize, as courts had interpreted the statute to only permit damages where the government released private information in bad faith (as opposed to accidentally).

== See also ==
- List of United States Supreme Court cases, volume 540
- List of United States Supreme Court cases
