= Mertens v. Hewitt Associates =

- Supreme Court of the United States

Argued February 22, 1993 Decided June 1, 1993
- Full case name: William J. Mertens, Alex W. Bandrowski, James A. Clark, and Russell Franz, Petitioners v. Hewitt Associates
- Citations: 508 U.S. 248 (more) 113 S. Ct. 2063; 124 L. Ed. 2d 161; 1993 U.S. LEXIS 3742; 61 U.S.L.W. 4510; 16 Employee Benefits Cas. (BNA) 2169; 93 Cal. Daily Op. Service 3918; 7 Fla. L. Weekly Fed. S 319

Case history
- Prior: 948 F.2d 607 (9th Cir. 1991); cert. granted, 506 U.S. 812 (1992).

Court membership
- Chief Justice William Rehnquist Associate Justices Byron White · Harry Blackmun; John P. Stevens · Sandra Day O'Connor; Antonin Scalia · Anthony Kennedy; David Souter · Clarence Thomas

Case opinions
- Majority: Scalia, joined by Blackmun, Kennedy, Souter, Thomas
- Dissent: White, joined by Rehnquist, Stevens, O'Connor

Laws applied
- Employee Retirement Income Security Act of 1974, 29 U.S.C. § 1001 et seq.

Mertens v. Hewitt Associates, 508 U.S. 248 (1993), is the second in the trilogy of United States Supreme Court ERISA preemption cases that effectively denies any remedy for employees who are harmed by medical malpractice or other bad acts of their health plan if they receive their health care from their employer.

== Facts ==
Hewitt Associates "was the plan's actuary in 1980, when Kaiser began to phase out its steelmaking operations, prompting early retirement by a large number of plan participants. Respondent did not, however, change the plan's actuarial assumptions to reflect the additional costs imposed by the retirements. As a result, Kaiser did not adequately fund the plan, and eventually the plan's assets became insufficient to satisfy its benefit obligations, causing the Pension Benefit Guaranty Corporation (PBGC) to terminate the plan...." Mertens, 508 U.S. 248, 250.

== Procedure ==
Plaintiff Mertens sued for a breach of fiduciary duty under ERISA. They asserted that it was a breach for an actuary to allow the employer, the Kaiser steel company, to select actuarial assumptions rather than have the professional actuary choose reasonable assumptions. Plaintiff sought "appropriate equitable relief" under Section 502(a)(3) not 502(a)(2) chosen by the Ninth Circuit in Russell.

== Decision ==
The Court held that in only allowing equitable relief, the statute did not authorize retrospective monetary relief.

== Criticism ==
According to John H. Langbein, Sterling Professor of Law and Legal History at Yale University the trouble got off to a bad start with Justice John Paul Stevens' dicta in Massachusetts Mutual Life Insurance Co. v. Russell, 473 U.S. 134 (1985) a case where the plaintiff was an employee who after getting her improperly denied disability income insurance benefits paid in full also sought money damages for physical and emotional injury for the delay of six months while the employer had denied payment. Because Section 502(a)(2) of ERISA ran to the benefit of the employee benefit plan (rather than the employee) and because the Ninth Circuit gave the plaintiff victory based on that section instead of Section 502(a)(3) which ran to the employee, the case was presented to the High Court in an awkward procedural posture. This mistake in choosing which section of ERISA to base the claim would lead to an error by Justice Scalia later in Mertens.

Because the plaintiff in Russell won in the Ninth Circuit, and because all Ninth Circuit decisions must be reversed by the High Court, Justice Stevens' dicta said that "remedying consequential injury even under the authorization for 'appropriate equitable relief' in section 502(a)(3) would entail the creation of an implied cause of action, contrary to the Court's established constraints on the implication of causes of action under federal statutes." Langbein at 1341. Stevens then suggested that ERISA was only concerned with protecting employee benefit plans not employees. This error in construing that Section 502(a)(2) limit to plans into a limit to all of ERISA remedy led to the High Court in denying an effective remedy to employees under ERISA Section 502(a)(3) in Mertens.

When Mertens reached the High Court, Russell was already in the U.S. Reports suggesting that money damages for consequential injury sounding in ERISA is an implied right of action rather than an express right.

== See also ==
- Kaiser Ventures
- List of United States Supreme Court cases, volume 508
