= Privacy Act of 1974 =

American law regarding the disclosure of personal information held by the US government

- Long title: An Act to amend title 5, United States Code, by adding a section 552a, to safeguard individual privacy from the misuse of Federal records, to provide that individuals be granted access to records concerning them which are maintained by Federal agencies, to establish a Privacy Protection Study Commission, and for other purposes.
- Enacted by: the 93rd United States Congress
- Effective: December 31, 1974

Citations
- Public law: 93-579
- Statutes at Large: 88 Stat. 1896

Codification
- Acts amended: Freedom of Information Act
- Titles amended: 5 U.S.C.: Government Organization and Employees
- U.S.C. sections created: 5 U.S.C. ch. 5 § 552a

Legislative history
- Introduced in the Senate as S. 3418 by Sam Ervin (D–NC) on May 1, 1974; Committee consideration by Senate Homeland Security and Governmental Affairs; Passed the Senate on November 21, 1974 (74–9); Passed the House on December 11, 1974 (passed, provisions of H.R. 16373) with amendment; Senate agreed to House amendment on December 17, 1974 (77–8) with further amendment; House agreed to Senate amendment on December 18, 1974 (agreed); Signed into law by President Gerald Ford on December 31, 1974

United States Supreme Court cases
- Department of Justice v. Provenzano, 469 U.S. 14 (1984); Department of Defense v. Federal Labor Relations Authority, 510 U.S. 487 (1994); Doe v. Chao, 540 U.S. 614 (2004); Federal Aviation Administration v. Cooper, 566 U.S. 284 (2012)

The Privacy Act of 1974 (Pub. L. 93–579, 88 Stat. 1896, enacted December 31, 1974, 5 U.S.C. § 552a), a United States federal law, establishes a Code of Fair Information Practice that governs the collection, maintenance, use, and dissemination of personally identifiable information about individuals that is maintained in systems of records by federal agencies. At its creation, it was meant to be an "American Bill of Rights on data."

A system of records is a group of records under the control of an agency from which information is retrieved by the name of the individual or by some identifier assigned to the individual. The Privacy Act requires that agencies give the public notice of their systems of records by publication in the Federal Register. The Privacy Act prohibits the disclosure of information from a system of records absent of the written consent of the subject individual, unless the disclosure is pursuant to one of twelve statutory exceptions. The Act also provides individuals with a means by which to seek access to and amendment of their records and sets forth various agency record-keeping requirements. Additionally, with people granted the right to review what was documented with their name, they are also able to find out if the "records have been disclosed" and are also given the right to make corrections.

== History ==
An idea enshrining a right to privacy became relevant when the Social Security number became a de facto identifier for people across the federal government, and computers installed across federal agencies in the late 1950s. In the early 1960s, there was widespread interest in a "federal data center," with Congress commissioning various reports looking into the idea.

However, with McCarthyism, the 1965–1966 Congressional wiretapping hearings, and cultural milestones like George Orwell's book Nineteen Eighty-Four, the public became concerned about the idea of the government knowing everything about an individual.

The idea of a "federal data bank" was debated in a series of Congressional hearings starting in 1966, one of them featuring author Vance Packard. He testified, "Big Brother, if he ever comes to the United States, may turn out to be...a relentless bureaucrat obsessed with efficiency."

By 1971, the Congressional hearings on privacy solidified a policy demand for an "American Bill of Rights on data," namely with a 1973 report called Records, Computers, and Rights of Citizens.

Passing a bill about the right to privacy became a priority in the light of Watergate and COINTELPRO, two scandals in which people and political parties considered "subversive" were subject to investigation and illegal surveillance by the government. President Nixon publicly supported the personal right to privacy in 1974, in an attempt to win back public trust in the government after Watergate.

Senator Sam Ervin was the bill's principal sponsor, especially as the House and Senate versions were combined. The law went into effect on September 27, 1975.

Although the Privacy Act was groundbreaking when it was passed, in subsequent years it has been criticized as lacking an enforcement mechanism. The United States is the only nation in the Organisation for Economic Co-operation and Development without a data protection agency to enforce privacy laws.

== Provisions ==
=== Conditions of disclosure ===
The Privacy Act states in part:

No agency shall disclose any record which is contained in a system of records by any means of communication to any person, or to another agency, except pursuant to a written request by, or with the prior written consent of, the individual to whom the record pertains...

There are specific exceptions to the Act that allow the use of personal records. Examples of these exceptions are:

- For statistical purposes by the Census Bureau and the Bureau of Labor Statistics
- For routine uses within a U.S. government agency
- For archival purposes "as a record which has sufficient historical or other value to warrant its continued preservation by the United States Government"
- For law enforcement purposes
- For congressional investigations
- Other administrative purposes

The Privacy Act mandates that each United States Government agency have in place an administrative and physical security system to prevent the unauthorized release of personal records.

To protect the privacy and liberty rights of individuals, federal agencies must state "the authority (whether granted by statute, or by Executive order of the President) which authorizes the solicitation of the information and whether disclosure of such information is mandatory or voluntary" when requesting information. (5 U.S.C. § 552e) This notice is common on almost all federal government forms which seek to gather information from individuals, many of which seek personal and confidential details.

=== Data integrity boards ===
Subsection "U" requires that each agency have a Data Integrity Board. Each agency's Data Integrity Board is supposed to make an annual report to OMB, available to the public, that includes all complaints that the Act was violated, such as use of records for unauthorized reasons or the holding of First Amendment Records and report on —..."(v) any violations of matching agreements that have been alleged or identified and any corrective action taken". Former Attorney General Dick Thornburg appointed a Data Integrity Board but since then, the United States Department of Justice has not published any Privacy Act reports.

==== Computer Matching and Privacy Protection Act ====
The Computer Matching and Privacy Protection Act of 1988, P.L. 100–503, amended the Privacy Act of 1974 by adding certain protections for the subjects of Privacy Act records whose records are used in automated matching programs. These protections have been mandated to ensure:

- procedural uniformity in carrying out matching programs;
- due process for subjects in order to protect their rights, and
- oversight of matching programs through the establishment of Data Integrity Boards at each agency engaging in matching to monitor the agency's matching activity.

The Computer Matching Act is codified as part of the Privacy Act.

=== Access to records ===
The Privacy Act also states:

Each agency that maintains a system of records shall—

1. Upon request by any individual ... permit him ... to review the record and have a copy made of all or any portion thereof in a form comprehensible to him ...
2. Permit the individual to request amendment of a record pertaining to him ...

=== Issues of scope ===
The Privacy Act does apply to the records of every "individual," defined as "a citizen of the United States or an alien lawfully admitted for permanent residence" but the Privacy Act only applies to records held by an "agency". Therefore, the records held by courts, executive components, or non-agency government entities are not subject to the provisions in the Privacy Act and there is no right to these records.

On January 25, 2017, President Trump signed an executive order that eliminates Privacy Act protections for foreigners. Section 14 of Trump's "Enhancing Public Safety" executive order directs federal agencies to "ensure that their privacy policies exclude persons who are not United States citizens or lawful permanent residents from the protections of the Privacy Act regarding personally identifiable information" to the extent consistent with applicable law.

== Exemptions ==
Broad exemptions of the Act include "routine [agency] use" of data, which can be claimed under a general "compatible" purpose. However, this can result in "mission creep" of a agency's database extending beyond its original stated goals.

The Act also forbade agencies from collecting information about people's First Amendment activities.

Following the controversial Passenger Name Record (PNR) agreement signed with the European Union (EU) in 2007, the Bush administration provided an exemption for the Department of Homeland Security and the Arrival and Departure Information System (ADIS) from the U.S. Privacy Act. ADIS is intended to authorize people to travel only after PNR and API (Advance Passenger Information) data has been checked and cleared through a US agency watchlist. The Automated Targeting System is also to be exempted. The Privacy Act does not protect non-US persons without lawful permanent residency in the US, which is problematic for the exchange of Passenger Name Record information between the US and the European Union.

== Limitations ==
The passing of the Privacy Act was a rushed bipartisan effort, with compromises made when combining the House and Senate versions of the bill.

Weaknesses in the Privacy Act included general exceptions for "routine use," intelligence and law enforcement agencies, as well as lacking an enforcement mechanism and violations having to be "intentional and willful." Even as early as 1976, law reviews acknowledged that there were many limitations on the Privacy Act, namely because it was "practically unenforceable." The 1977 report from the Privacy Protection Study Commission (created by the Act) also concluded that the Act did not result in intended benefits, because definitions and disclosure of data use were unclear, and the public was not aware of the Act's provisions.

The Act only covers record systems that "retrieve" information by name or individual identifier, which is easily circumvented. A database could contain identifying information (such as name or SSN) without being indexed by them, and therefore would be exempted from the Privacy Act.

In addition, the Act was undercut in federal courts using tort law theory. Federal courts established that there had to be "actual damages" for claims to be levied against the Act, not just "reputation loss" or "emotional distress." (Refer to Doe v. Chao and Federal Aviation Administration v. Cooper.)

== Under the second Trump administration ==
Under Trump's second administration, the Privacy Act has been cited in up to fourteen lawsuits pertaining to DOGE access to data that could contain sensitive personal data. One instance involves sharing Medicaid data on immigrants to deportation officials and another involves DOGE access to federal employee, retiree and applicant personal information. Congressional leader Gerry Connolly stated "I am concerned that DOGE is moving personal information across agencies without the notification required under the Privacy Act or related laws, such that the American people are wholly unaware their data is being manipulated in this way."

Due to the recent lawsuits, Congressional leader Lori Trahan announced an effort to modernize and update the Act to address growing concerns about government surveillance, unvetted access, and misuse.

== See also ==
- Data privacy
- Digital identity
- Privacy
- Civil liberties
- Information privacy law
- Federal Records Act
- Data Act (Sweden)
- Bundesdatenschutzgesetz

== Sources ==
This article uses material from the public domain source:

- "The Privacy Act of 1974". United States Department of Justice. 16 June 2014.
- "Executive Order: Enhancing Public Safety in the Interior of the United States". whitehouse.gov – via National Archives.
