= List of United States Supreme Court cases, volume 508 =

This is a list of all the United States Supreme Court cases from volume 508 of the United States Reports:

Case name	Citation	Date decided
United States v. Idaho ex rel. Director, Idaho Dept. of Water Resources	508 U.S. 1	1993
Cisneros v. Alpine Ridge Group	508 U.S. 10	1993
Moreau v. Klevenhagen	508 U.S. 22	1993
Stinson v. United States	508 U.S. 36	1993
Professional Real Estate Investors, Inc. v. Columbia Pictures Industries, Inc.	508 U.S. 49	1993
United States v. Padilla	508 U.S. 77	1993
Cardinal Chemical Co. v. Morton Int'l, Inc.	508 U.S. 83	1993
McNeil v. United States	508 U.S. 106	1993
Oklahoma Tax Comm'n v. Sac and Fox Nation	508 U.S. 114	1993
Deal v. United States	508 U.S. 129	1993
El Vocero de Puerto Rico v. Puerto Rico	508 U.S. 147	1993
Commissioner v. Keystone Consol. Industries, Inc.	508 U.S. 152	1993
United States Department of Justice v. Landano	508 U.S. 165	1993
Lincoln v. Vigil	508 U.S. 182	1993
Keene Corp. v. United States	508 U.S. 200	1993
Smith v. United States	508 U.S. 223	1993
Mertens v. Hewitt Associates	508 U.S. 248	1993
Sullivan v. Louisiana	508 U.S. 275	1993
Musick, Peeler & Garrett v. Employers Ins. of Wausau	508 U.S. 286	1993
FCC v. Beach Communications, Inc.	508 U.S. 307	1993
Nobelman v. American Savings Bank	508 U.S. 324	1993
Gilmore v. Taylor	508 U.S. 333	1993
Minnesota v. Dickerson	508 U.S. 366	1993
Lamb's Chapel v. Center Moriches Union Free School Dist.	508 U.S. 384	1993
Good Samaritan Hospital v. Shalala	508 U.S. 402	1993
Antoine v. Byers & Anderson, Inc.	508 U.S. 429	1993
United States National Bank of Oregon v. Independent Insurance Agents of America	508 U.S. 439	1993
Rake v. Wade	508 U.S. 464	1993
Wisconsin v. Mitchell	508 U.S. 476	1993
Department of Treasury v. Fabe	508 U.S. 491	1993
Church of Lukumi Babalu Aye, Inc. v. Hialeah	508 U.S. 520	1993
Local 144 Nursing Home Pension Fund v. Demisay	508 U.S. 581	1993
Concrete Pipe & Products of Cal., Inc. v. Construction Laborers Pension Trust for Southern Cal.	508 U.S. 602	1993
Northeastern Fla. Chapter, Associated Gen. Contractors of America v. Jacksonville	508 U.S. 656	1993
South Dakota v. Bourland	508 U.S. 679	1993
Blodgett v. Campbell	508 U.S. 1301	1993
