= Title 5 of the United States Code =

U.S. federal statutes on government organization

Title 5 of the United States Code is a positive law title of the United States Code with the heading "Government Organization And Employees".

== Provisions ==
Title 5 contains organizational and administrative provisions directing the federal government, including the Administrative Procedure Act, Freedom of Information Act, Privacy Act of 1974, Congressional Review Act as well as authorization for government reorganizations such as Reorganization Plan No. 3.

The title also contains various federal employee and civil service laws of the United States, including the Federal Service Labor-Management Relations Statute. Other civil service provisions in Title 5 include authorization for the Office of Personnel Management and the General Salary Schedule and Executive Schedule classification systems. It also is the Title that specifies Federal holidays (5 U.S.C. § 6103). In addition, there is an appendix to Title 5 but it is not itself considered positive law. It contains reorganization plans.

== History ==
On September 6, 1966, Title 5 was enacted as positive law by Pub. L. 89–554 (80 Stat. 378). Prior to the 1966 positive law recodification, Title 5 had the heading, "Executive Departments and Government Officers and Employees."

In 2022, Congress moved the Federal Advisory Committee Act, Inspector General Act of 1978, and the Ethics in Government Act from the Title 5 Appendix to Title 5 itself.

== Part I—The Agencies Generally ==
Part I

- Chapter 1—Organization
- Chapter 3—Powers
- Chapter 4—Inspectors General
- Chapter 5—Administrative Procedure
- Chapter 6—The Analysis of Regulatory Functions
- Chapter 7—Judicial Review
- Chapter 8—Congressional Review of Agency Rulemaking
- Chapter 9—Executive Reorganization
- Chapter 10—Federal Advisory Committees

== Part II—Civil Service Functions and Responsibilities ==
Part II

- Chapter 11—Office of Personnel Management
- Chapter 12—Merit Systems Protection Board, Office of Special Counsel, and Employee Right of Action
- Chapter 13—Special Authority
- Chapter 14—Agency Chief Human Capital Officers
- Chapter 15—Political Activity of Certain State and Local Employees

== Part III—Employees ==
Part III

- Subpart A—General Provisions
  - Chapter 21—Definitions
  - Chapter 23—Merit System Principles
  - Chapter 29—Commissions, Oaths, Records, and Reports
- Subpart B—Employment and Retention
  - Chapter 31—Authority for employment
  - Chapter 33—Examination, selection, and placement
  - Chapter 34—Part-time career employment opportunities
  - Chapter 35—Retention preference, voluntary separation incentive payments, restoration, and reemployment
  - Chapter 37—Information technology exchange program
- Subpart C—Employee Performance
  - Chapter 41—Training
  - Chapter 43—Performance appraisal
  - Chapter 45—Incentive awards
  - Chapter 47—Personnel research programs and demonstration projects
  - Chapter 48—Agency personnel demonstration project
- Subpart D—Pay and Allowances
  - Chapter 51—Classification
  - Chapter 53—Pay rates and systems
  - Chapter 54—Human capital performance fund
  - Chapter 55—Pay administration
  - Chapter 57—Travel, transportation, and subsistence
  - Chapter 59—Allowances
- Subpart E—Attendance and Leave
  - Chapter 61—Hours of work
  - Chapter 63—Leave
  - Chapter 65—Telework
- Subpart F—Labor-Management and Employee Relations
  - Chapter 71—Labor-management relations
  - Chapter 72—Antidiscrimination; Right to petition Congress
  - Chapter 73—Suitability, security, and conduct
  - Chapter 75—Adverse actions
  - Chapter 77—Appeals
  - Chapter 79—Services to employees
- Subpart G—Insurance and Annuities
  - Chapter 81—Compensation for work injuries
  - Chapter 83—Retirement
  - Chapter 84—Federal employees' retirement system
  - Chapter 85—Unemployment compensation
  - Chapter 87—Life insurance
  - Chapter 89—Health insurance
  - Chapter 89A—Enhanced dental benefits
  - Chapter 89B—Enhanced vision benefits
  - Chapter 90—Long-term care insurance
- Subpart H—Access to Criminal History Record Information
  - Chapter 91—Access to criminal history records for national security and other purposes
  - Chapter 92—Prohibition on criminal history inquiries prior to conditional offer
- Subpart I—Miscellaneous
  - Chapter 95—Personnel flexibilities relating to the Internal Revenue Service
  - Chapter 96—Personnel flexibilities relating to land management agencies
  - Chapter 97—Department of Homeland Security
  - Chapter 98—National Aeronautics and Space Administration
  - Chapter 99—Department of Defense personnel authorities
  - Chapter 101—Federal Emergency Management Agency personnel
  - Chapter 102—United States Secret Service Uniformed Division personnel
  - Chapter 103—Department of State
- Subpart J—Enhanced Personnel Security Programs
  - Chapter 110—Enhanced Personnel Security Programs

== Part IV—Ethics Requirements ==
Part IV

- Chapter 131—Ethics in Government
