= Shaare Tefila Congregation v. Cobb =

- Supreme Court of the United States

Decided May 18, 1987
- Full case name: Shaare Tefila Congregation v. Cobb
- Citations: 481 U.S. 615 (more)

Holding
- Jewish people can file racial discrimination suits.

Court membership
- Chief Justice William Rehnquist Associate Justices William J. Brennan Jr. · Byron White; Thurgood Marshall · Harry Blackmun; Lewis F. Powell Jr. · John P. Stevens; Sandra Day O'Connor · Antonin Scalia

Case opinion
- Majority: White, joined by unanimous

Laws applied
- Civil Rights Act of 1866

Shaare Tefila Congregation v. Cobb, 481 U.S. 615 (1987), was a United States Supreme Court case in which the Court held that Jewish people can file racial discrimination suits. Under the terms of the decision, ethnoreligious groups, those that share a common ancestry and religious identity, could pursue actions for racial discrimination, a change that allows Jews—as well as Arabs and Sikhs, among others—to use existing civil rights laws.

The case involved a 1982 incident in which a group of eight vandals spray-painted antisemitic slogans, a swastika and Ku Klux Klan symbols on a synagogue in Silver Spring, Maryland. In addition to pursuing criminal prosecutions of the vandals, the congregation sought monetary compensation under civil rights laws for damages caused in the acts of racial discrimination. Lower courts had ruled that the actions were a form of religious discrimination not covered by the Civil Rights Act of 1866.

== Background ==
=== Vandalism and criminal convictions ===
Originally established in Northeast Washington, D.C., the Conservative Jewish Shaare Tefila Congregation moved to Silver Spring, Maryland, in the 1940s. John William Cobb was one of a group of eight who targeted the synagogue on November 1, 1982. The vandals spray-painted antisemitic graffiti on the walls of the synagogue and criminal prosecutions were sought for the individuals who participated in the incident. Michael David Remer, one of the participants, was convicted and faced up to three years in prison and a fine of $2,500 for his actions including spray-painting a swastika on the synagogue wall. Irvin Shappell of the Jewish Advocacy Center cited the conviction as evidence of the community's determination to "fight back" against such incidents. The Maryland state's attorney described the case as one of few convictions in the county court system for such acts. One other person was convicted among the eight persons arrested.

=== Civil rights litigation ===
In addition to the criminal convictions, the congregation sought monetary damages from the perpetrators under the terms of laws including the Civil Rights Act of 1866 and the 1871 Ku Klux Klan Act, which permit relief for actions taken based on race or color, though they do not explicitly include religious-based hate crimes. The synagogue filed suit to recoup the $3,000 it spent to remove the graffiti and requested that any monetary compensation awarded in excess of that amount be distributed to the Montgomery County Human Relations Commission.

In March 1986, judge Norman Park Ramsey of the United States District Court for the District of Maryland indicated that he was sympathetic to the synagogue's efforts to seek redress, but rejected the suit under racial discrimination laws, as Jews are not a "distinct or recognizable 'race' and are not 'commonly identified as such.'"

In a 2–1 decision issued in October 1986, the United States Court of Appeals for the Fourth Circuit ruled that Jews were part of the white race and that the congregation was thus ineligible to pursue compensation under civil rights law because they do not constitute a distinct non-white race. Judges Kenneth Keller Hall and Francis Dominic Murnaghan Jr. voted in the majority, stating that "we do not find the position of Jews in this society to be analogous to that of Mexican-Americans or others commonly considered to be non-whites." Judge J. Harvie Wilkinson III issued a dissent, in which he said that the individuals who attacked the synagogue did so because they believed that Jews were a separate race and that the intention of the Civil Rights Act of 1866 and the Ku Klux Klan Act of 1871 were to "halt the spread of violence and hatred by those motivated by such perceptions."

== Supreme Court ==
The congregation's attorney argued before the United States Supreme Court in February 1987 that the vandals had acted out of a belief that Jews were non-whites and thus the act constituted racial discrimination, while the attorney who represented one of the vandals argued that their acts were an attack made on a religious basis and were therefore not covered by the civil rights legislation.

In May 1987, the Supreme Court ruled unanimously in the congregation's favor, allowing the suit against the vandals to be filed on the basis of racial discrimination under post-Civil War laws, including 41 U.S.C. Section 1982, based on an analysis that Jews were considered to be a distinct race when the laws were adopted and that such actions would be within the purview of the civil rights laws. In the decision, Justice Byron White stated "Jews can state a Section 1982 claim of racial discrimination since they were among the peoples considered to be distinct races and hence within the protection of the statute at the time that it was passed," regardless of changes in perceptions of racial identity that had taken place since. The court held that this racial identification would apply to discrimination to Arabs, as well as Jews, if they had been targeted based on their ethnicity.

== Later developments ==
In December 1988, after the case had been remanded to a district court, the congregants felt that had established their goal of demonstrating on a judicial basis that antisemitism is "a civil rights issue". They released their claims against the vandals in exchange for a letter of apology and $300 that were used to repay the congregation's insurer.

== See also ==
- Saint Francis College v. al-Khazraji
- Mandla v Dowell-Lee [1983] 2 AC 548, similar UK case relating to Sikhs.
