= Hodel =

Hodel may refer to:

- Donald P. Hodel (born 1935), United States Secretary of Energy and Secretary of Interior
- George Hodel (1907–1999), American physician, and a suspect in the Elizabeth Short murder.
- Max Hödel (1857–1878), failed assassin of Wilhelm I of Germany
- Merwin Hodel (1931–1988), American football player
- Nathan Hodel (born 1977), American football player
- Ronny Hodel (born 1982), Swiss footballer
- Hodel v. Irving, U.S. Supreme Court case
- Hodel is the second oldest daughter in the play Fiddler on the Roof.

== See also ==
- Hodell
