= United States v. General Dynamics Corp. =

- Supreme Court of the United States

Argued January 13, 1987 Decided April 22, 1987
- Full case name: United States v. General Dynamics Corp.
- Citations: 481 U.S. 239 (more) 107 S. Ct. 1732; 95 L. Ed. 2d 226; 55 U.S.L.W. 4526; 87-1 U.S. Tax Cas. (CCH) ¶ 9280; 59 A.F.T.R.2d (RIA) 899; 8 Employee Benefits Cas. (BNA) 1489

Case history
- Prior: 773 F.2d 1224 (Fed. Cir. 1985) (reversed)

Holding
- Under 162(a) of the Internal Revenue Code (26 U.S.C. 162(a)) and Treasury Regulation 1.461-1(a)(2) ( 26 CFR 1.461-1(a)(2)), the "all events" test entitled an accrual-basis taxpayer to a federal income tax business-expense deduction, for the taxable year in which (1) all events had occurred which determined the fact of the taxpayer's liability, and (2) the amount of that liability could be determined with reasonable accuracy.

Court membership
- Chief Justice William Rehnquist Associate Justices William J. Brennan Jr. · Byron White; Thurgood Marshall · Harry Blackmun; Lewis F. Powell Jr. · John P. Stevens; Sandra Day O'Connor · Antonin Scalia

Case opinions
- Majority: Marshall, joined by Rehnquist, Brennan, White, Powell, Scalia
- Dissent: O'Connor, joined by Blackmun, Stevens

Laws applied
- Internal Revenue Code

United States v. General Dynamics Corp., 481 U.S. 239 (1987), is a United States Supreme Court case, which hold that under 162(a) of the Internal Revenue Code (26 U.S.C. 162(a)) and Treasury Regulation 1.461-1(a)(2) ( 26 CFR 1.461-1(a)(2)), the "all events" test entitled an accrual-basis taxpayer to a federal income tax business-expense deduction, for the taxable year in which (1) all events had occurred which determined the fact of the taxpayer's liability, and (2) the amount of that liability could be determined with reasonable accuracy.

== Background ==
=== Facts ===
The corporation used the accrual method of accounting for federal tax purposes; its fiscal year was the same as the calendar year. From 1962 until October 1, 1972, the corporation purchased group-medical insurance for its employees and qualified dependents from two private insurance carriers. Beginning in October 1972, the corporation became a self-insurer with regard to its medical care plans. Instead of continuing to purchase insurance from outside carriers, it undertook to pay medical claims out of its own funds, while continuing to employ private carriers to administer the medical care plans.

An accrual-basis employer—a corporation which filed a consolidated federal income tax return with several subsidiaries--(1) reimbursed employees for certain medical expenses of employees and their qualified dependents; (2) established reserve accounts to reflect the employer's liability for medical care which had been received by covered individuals during the last quarter of 1972, but still not paid for by the employer as of December 31, 1972; (3) calculated the amount of the reserve based upon an estimate of the aggregate liability to be incurred for the period in question; and (4) claimed the estimated reserve as a business expense in an amended 1972 federal income tax return.

=== Audit ===
The Internal Revenue Service (IRS) audited appellee corporation's 1972 tax return. The corporation filed an amended return, claiming it was entitled to deduct its reserve as an accrued expense, and seek a refund. The IRS disallowed the deduction.

=== Claims Court ===
General Dynamics challenged the disallowance and sought a federal income tax refund in the Claims Court, which sustained the deduction and expressed the view that (1) there was no dispute that expenses incurred by the employer in connection with its employee medical-benefit plans were deductible as ordinary and necessary business expenses under 162(a), so that the issue in the case was the timing of the deduction; and (2) deduction of the reimbursement reserve on the 1972 return satisfied the "all events" test, where (a) the fact of the employer's liability was established when a qualified employee or dependent received covered medical services, (b) the subsequent acts of claims filing and processing were ministerial in nature, not conditions precedent to liability, and (c) the employer's aggregate-estimate system for determining the amount of liability was logical and reasonable (6 Cl. Ct 250).

=== Federal Circuit ===
On appeal, the United States Court of Appeals for the Federal Circuit affirmed, largely on the basis of the Claims Court opinion.

== Opinion of the court ==
The issue before the Court on certiorari was whether an accrual-basis taxpayer providing medical benefits to its employees could deduct at the close of the taxable year an estimate of its obligation to pay for medical care obtained by employees or their qualified dependents during the final quarter of the year, for claims which had not been reported to the employer.

The Supreme Court reversed the judgment of the Federal Circuit, disallowing the deduction for employee medical expenses incurred, but not reported to the employer, in 1972. In an opinion by Justice Marshall, the Court held that, under 162(a) of the Code, the accrual-basis employer did not satisfy the "all events" test so as to enable the employer to deduct at the close of 1972 an estimated reserve for the employer's obligation to reimburse employees or their qualified dependents for covered medical expenses incurred but not reported to the employer during the final quarter of 1972, where (1) the last event necessary to fix the employer's liability was the filing of a claim with the employer; (2) the employer had failed to demonstrate that any of the reserve represented claims which had been filed prior to the close of 1972 but not yet processed; (3) the fact that the employer might have been able to make a reasonable estimate of how many claims would be filed for the last quarter of 1972 might justify such a reserve as an appropriate accounting measure, but did not, by itself, warrant a tax deduction; and (4) if the "all events" test permitted deduction of an estimated reserve representing claims that were actually likely but not yet reported, Congress would not have needed to maintain an explicit provision (26 U.S.C. 832(b)(5), 832(c)(4)) that insurance companies could deduct such reserves.

=== Dissent ===
Justice O'Connor, joined by Justices Blackmun and Stevens, wrote a dissent chastising the majority for adopting a rigid version of the "all events" that retreated from prior holdings, arguing that the decision will "unnecessarily burden[] taxpayers by further expanding the difference between tax and business accounting methods without a compelling reason to do so."

== See also ==
- List of United States Supreme Court cases, volume 481
- List of United States Supreme Court cases
- Lists of United States Supreme Court cases by volume
- List of United States Supreme Court cases by the Rehnquist Court
