= United States v. Johnson (1987) =

- Supreme Court of the United States

Argued February 24, 1987 Decided May 18, 1987
- Full case name: United States v. Johnson, Personal Representative of the Estate of Johnson
- Citations: 481 U.S. 681 (more) 107 S. Ct. 2063; 95 L. Ed. 2d 648; 1987 U.S. LEXIS 2055; 55 U.S.L.W. 4647

Case history
- Prior: Johnson v. United States, 749 F.2d 1530 (11th Cir. 1985), affirmed on rehearing, 779 F.2d 1492 (11th Cir. 1986)

Holding
- The Feres doctrine bars an FTCA action on behalf of a service member killed during an activity incident to service, even if the alleged negligence is by civilian employees of the Federal Government.

Court membership
- Chief Justice William Rehnquist Associate Justices William J. Brennan Jr. · Byron White; Thurgood Marshall · Harry Blackmun; Lewis F. Powell Jr. · John P. Stevens; Sandra Day O'Connor · Antonin Scalia

Case opinions
- Majority: Powell, joined by Rehnquist, White, Blackmun, O'Connor
- Dissent: Scalia, joined by Brennan, Marshall, Stevens

Laws applied
- Federal Tort Claims Act

United States v. Johnson, 481 U.S. 681 (1987), was a United States Supreme Court case in which the Court barred the widow of a serviceman killed while piloting a helicopter on a United States Coast Guard rescue mission from bringing her claim under the Federal Tort Claims Act (the "FTCA" or the "Act"). The decision was based upon the Supreme Court's holding in Feres v. United States (1950): "[T]he Government is not liable under the Federal Tort Claims Act for injuries to servicemen where the injuries arise out of or are in the course of activity incident to service."

== Background ==
Lieutenant Commander Johnson, a Coast Guard helicopter pilot stationed in Hawaii, was dispatched along with his crew, to search for a vessel in distress. Because of inclement weather and poor visibility, Johnson "requested radar assistance from the Federal Aviation Administration ("FAA"), . . . the FAA controllers assumed positive radar control over the helicopter. Shortly thereafter, the helicopter crashed into the side of a mountain and . . . all the crew members, including Johnson, were killed in the crash."

Johnson's widow and personal representative of his estate brought a wrongful death action against the government pursuant to the FTCA. Plaintiff alleged that Johnson's death was due to the negligence of the FAA flight controllers. The government filed a motion to dismiss, claiming that the plaintiff was barred from recovering damages from the federal government, because Johnson died while performing his military duties.

The district court granted the motion, based solely on the Supreme Court's decision in Feres. The Court of Appeals for the Eleventh Circuit reversed, noting that the action did not involve military service. The court determined that since the alleged tortfeasors were civilian employees of the government, rather than military employees, judicial second-guessing of the civilian's conduct would not adversely affect military discipline.

The Eleventh Circuit's original opinion antedated the Supreme Court's opinion in United States v. Shearer (1985). The Eleventh Circuit therefore granted the government's petition for rehearing en banc to reconsider Johnson's case in light of the Supreme Court's upcoming decision in Shearer; by the time consideration had occurred, Shearer had been decided. In a per curiam opinion on rehearing, a majority of the Eleventh Circuit concluded that Shearer "reinforced the analysis set forth in the panel opinion."

== Majority Opinion ==
The Supreme Court, in a 5–4 decision authored by Justice Powell, reversed, holding that the cause of action was barred by Feres. The opinion indicates that Stencel required the reversal. The Court's opinion then restated the three rationales offered in Stencel:

1. the distinctively federal relationship between soldier and government would make the application of state law inappropriate;
2. the VBA was intended to be the exclusive remedy for injuries incident to military service; and
3. judicial second-guessing of military acts and decisions would have an adverse effect on military discipline.

The Court then found each of the three Stencel reasons for the Feres bar applicable to Johnson. Since decedent's death-producing injuries had been incident to his military service, the first reason applied. Because his widow had applied for and received compensation for her husband's death pursuant to the Veterans' Benefits Act, the second reason applied. As for the third reason, the Court wrote:

Even if military negligence is not specifically alleged in a tort action, a suit based upon service-related activity necessarily implicates the military judgments and decisions that are inextricably intertwined with the conduct of the military mission. Moreover, military discipline involves not only obedience to orders, but more generally duty and loyalty to one's service and to one's country. Suits brought by service members against the Government for service-related injuries could undermine the commitment essential to effective service and thus have the potential to disrupt military discipline in the broadest sense of the word.

== Dissent ==
Justice Scalia, with three Justices joining, filed a dissenting opinion. He concluded that Feres had been "wrongly decided," but noted that since "[w]e have not been asked by the plaintiff to overrule Feres, we need not resolve whether considerations of stare decisis should induce us, despite the plain error of the case, to leave bad enough alone."

Rather, Justice Scalia would have declined to apply Feres to a case in which the allegedly negligent actors were civilian employees of the government. He conceded that the limitation it sought was more a product of pragmatism than logical symmetry: "We confess that the line between FTCA suits alleging military negligence and those alleging civilian negligence has nothing to recommend it except that it would limit our clearly wrong decision in Feres and confine the unfairness and irrationality that decision has bred. But that, we think, is justification enough." As the dissent noted, the Court itself had disavowed the reasons originally offered in Feres and substituted as the only rationale (until Johnson resurrected the other two) the after-discovered military discipline concern. Justice Scalia concluded that none of the reasons that the Court has asserted, from Feres through Shearer, persuasively supported the Feres bar.

He further disagreed with the majority opinion in that it did not regard the Congressional failure to amend the FTCA in the years since Feres as bespeaking to congressional acquiescence in the Court's interpretation of the Act:

We cannot take comfort, as the Court does from Congress' failure to amend the FTCA to overturn Feres. The unlegislated desires of later Congresses with regard to one thread in the fabric of the FTCA could hardly have any bearing upon the proper interpretation of the entire fabric of compromises that their predecessors enacted into law in 1946. And even if they could, intuiting those desires from congressional failure to act is an uncertain enterprise which takes as its starting point disregard of the checks and balances in the constitutional scheme of legislation designed to assure that not all desires of a majority of the Legislature find their way into law.
