= Cruz v. New York =

- Supreme Court of the United States

Argued December 1, 1986 Decided April 21, 1987
- Full case name: Eulogio Cruz v. New York
- Citations: 481 U.S. 186 (more) 107 S. Ct. 1714; 95 L. Ed. 2d 162, 55 U.S.L.W. 4515; 1986 WL 728116;

Case history
- Prior: Demurrer overruled, N.Y.

Holding
- The Confrontation Clause bars the admission, in a joint trial, of a non-testifying codefendant's confession incriminating the defendant, even if the defendant's own confession is admitted against him.

Court membership
- Chief Justice William Rehnquist Associate Justices William J. Brennan Jr. · Byron White; Thurgood Marshall · Harry Blackmun; Lewis F. Powell Jr. · John P. Stevens; Sandra Day O'Connor · Antonin Scalia

Case opinions
- Majority: Scalia, joined by Brennan, Marshall, Blackmun, Stevens
- Dissent: White, joined by Rehnquist, Powell, O'Connor

Laws applied
- U.S. Const. amend. VI

Cruz v. New York, 481 U.S. 186 (1987), was a decision by the Supreme Court of the United States in which the Court held, 5–4, that the Confrontation Clause of the Constitution's Sixth Amendment barred the admission, in a joint trial, of a non-testifying codefendant's confession incriminating the defendant, even if the defendant's own confession was admitted against him.

== Background of the case ==
At 5:15 AM on November 29, 1981, Police Officers Dennis Fitzpatrick and Ronald Zuba responded to a radio report of an incident at the Gaseteria service station in Bronx County, New York. Upon arriving at the gas station, the officers found attendant Victoriano Agostini lying on the floor of the office bleeding from the back of his head. Agostini was taken to a hospital where he was pronounced dead. It was determined that he had sustained two bullet wounds to the head. At 8:00 AM, Detective Patrick Cirincione of the Crime Scene Unit arrived at the gas station where he photographed the scene. He recovered no firearms or spent shells.

The following day, an associate medical examiner performed an autopsy on the deceased, which confirmed that two gunshot wounds were the cause of death. Specifically, one bullet entered the decedent's head above the right ear from a distance of three to six inches and the second bullet entered the left front region of the head. The paths of both bullets were backward, downward, and toward the right. The deceased showed further evidence of blunt force trauma to the bridge of the nose, area around the eyes, right cheek, and left shoulder. The bullet fragments recovered indicated that the bullets had been .38 caliber projectiles and could have been fired from a .357 magnum handgun.

Five months later, while police were investigating a separate homicide of Jerry Cruz (no relation to petitioner), Jerry Cruz's brother, Norberto Cruz, told police that five months prior, on November 29, 1981, Eulogio Cruz and Eulogio's brother, Benjamin Cruz, told him that they had killed a gas station attendant during an attempted robbery. On May 3, 1982, Benjamin Cruz voluntarily entered a police station after a detective left a card at his residence, requesting that he contact him in connection with the murder of Jerry Cruz. During questioning, Benjamin Cruz spontaneously confessed to the Agostini murder. Later that day, an assistant district attorney took a detailed, videotaped confession of Benjamin Cruz in which Benjamin implicated Eulogio and the deceased Jerry Cruz in Agostini's death. Eulogio, however, made no statement when he was subsequently arrested.

A grand jury sitting in New York Supreme Court, Bronx County, indicted Eulogio and Benjamin Cruz for felony murder and lesser offenses in connection with the homicide. On the People's motion, their cases were consolidated for trial. Eulogio entered a pretrial motion to sever the cases based on Bruton v. United States, 391 U.S. 123, which was denied. At the trial, there were no eyewitnesses. The only direct incriminating evidence against either brother was their alleged confession to Norberto Cruz, and the videotaped confession of Benjamin Cruz. The videotaped confession was entered over the objections of Euologio, but with an accompanying jury instruction that it be used only against him. Both men were found guilty of felony murder. Eulogio was sentenced to a prison term of fifteen years to life. He appealed, but the New York Court Supreme Court, Appellate Division, affirmed the lower court's ruling.

== Majority opinion ==
Writing for the Court, Justice Scalia referenced Bruton v. United States, 391 U.S. 123 (1968), in laying out the question presented in the instant case. In Bruton, the Court held that a defendant was deprived of his rights under the Confrontation Clause if a confession by his codefendant was introduced in their joint trial, regardless of whether the jury received instructions only to consider it against the confessor. Similarly, the question in Cruz concerned whether a codefendant's confession is barred if the defendant's confession is substantially the same as the codefendant's.

Under the Court's analysis, the Confrontation Clause of the Sixth Amendment provides for defendants to confront witnesses that testify against them. This guarantee, which is extended to defendants in state courts through the Fourteenth Amendment, includes the right to cross-examine witnesses. In a joint trial, the confession of one defendant that implicates a codefendant is not admissible against the codefendant unless the confessor waives his Fifth Amendment rights in order to submit to cross-examination.

In Bruton, the Court held that jury instructions to ignore non-testifying codefendants' confessions, implicating the defendant, were insufficient:

[T]here are some contexts in which the risk that the jury will not, or cannot, follow instructions is so great, and the consequences of failure so vital to the defendant, that the practical and human limitations of the jury system cannot be ignored.

Fearing that juries would find it impossible to discount an implicating confession against a codefendant who stood alongside the confessor, the Court discounted such instructions. In a subsequent case, Parker, the Court was split on the same issue where each defendant had made his own confession. Writing in concurrence, Justice Blackmun argued that introduction of a codefendant's own interlocking confession could cause a harmless violation of the Confrontation Clause (he found such an example in that case), but that there were other foreseeable cases in which it could lead to a more harmful violation.

Here, the Court adopted Blackmun's argument from Parker, finding that there were many imaginable inculpatory statements that could cause a corroborating statement to be "devastating" to a defense. The Court argued that the content and existence of Cruz's own confession was open to question because it depended on the acceptance of Norberto's testimony, which his codefendant's confession was actually video-recorded.

The Court went on to find an inverse relationship in the extent to which two confessions "interlock":

A codefendant's confession will be relatively harmless if the incriminating story it tells is different from that which the defendant himself is alleged to have told, but enormously damaging if it confirms, in all essential respects, the defendant's alleged confession. It might be otherwise if the defendant were standing by his confession, in which case it could be said that the codefendant's confession does no more than support the defendant's very own case. But in the real world of criminal litigation, the defendant is seeking to avoid his confession—on the ground that it was not accurately reported, or that it was not really true when made.

Justice Scalia described the Court's holding as being that the Confrontation Clause barred the admission, in a joint trial, of a non-testifying codefendant's confession incriminating the defendant, even if the defendant's own confession is admitted against him. Justice Scalia concluded by pointing out that where a codefendant was unavailable, a defendant's confession could be considered at trial to assess whether a codefendant's own statements were supported by sufficient "indicia of reliability" to be admissible against him, despite the lack of opportunity for cross-examination.

== Dissent ==
Justice White wrote a dissent, joined by Chief Justice Rehnquist and Justices Powell and O'Connor. Turning to Bruton, Justice White pointed out that Bruton had not confessed whereas Cruz's own confession was at issue. Justice White placed great significance on the importance and evidentiary weight of a defendant's own confession. Under Justice White's rationale, while a codefendant's out-of-court statements implicating the defendant were both treated as hearsay and inherently suspect, the defendant himself had confessed. Justice White rejected the notion that interlocking confessions would have the effect of "devastating" the other defendant's defense as outlined in Bruton.

Justice White placed great importance on the difference between Bruton and the instant case:

Bruton disallowed the codefendant's confession into evidence, even with an instruction to disregard it as evidence against Bruton, because it posed a "substantial threat" to his Confrontation Clause rights. It does not defy logic to find that in other circumstances, such as where the defendant's own confession interlocks with his codefendant's, the threat is not of such magnitude. Even where remorseless logic may seem to justify the extension of what otherwise might be a sound constitutional rule, common sense should prevail. Otherwise, especially in applying prophylactic rules, we may trivialize the principles of prior cases by applying them to situations that in general do not really pose the dangers that the rules were intended to obviate.

Justice White went on to argue, on public policy grounds, that the Court's holding would negatively impact the justice system. His concern was that prosecutors would cease to seek joint trials in cases of interlocking confessions, while judges would not admit codefendant's confessions as a prophylactic measure, even where no harmful error would likely result. This would overburden the state, inconvenience police and witnesses, cause delays in the trial system, and possibly lead to inconsistent verdicts, he continued.

Justice White concluded by pointing to other case law that suggests that a codefendant's interlocking confession will often be admissible against the defendant, negating the Confrontation Clause issue of Bruton. Thus, in the case of Cruz, since the codefendant's confession "carries numerous indicia of reliability," Justice White suggested that the state court should not be precluded from considering the admissibility of that confession against Cruz.

== See also ==
- List of United States Supreme Court cases, volume 481
