= Arkansas Writers' Project, Inc. v. Ragland =

- Supreme Court of the United States

Decided April 22, 1987
- Full case name: Arkansas Writers' Project, Inc. v. Ragland
- Citations: 481 U.S. 221 (more)

Holding
- A sales-tax scheme that taxes general interest magazines, but exempts newspapers and religious, professional, trade, and sports journals, violates the First Amendment's freedom of the press guarantee.

Court membership
- Chief Justice William Rehnquist Associate Justices William J. Brennan Jr. · Byron White; Thurgood Marshall · Harry Blackmun; Lewis F. Powell Jr. · John P. Stevens; Sandra Day O'Connor · Antonin Scalia

Case opinions
- Majority: Marshall
- Concurrence: Stevens
- Dissent: Scalia, joined by Rehnquist

Arkansas Writers' Project, Inc. v. Ragland, 481 U.S. 221 (1987), was a United States Supreme Court case in which the court held that a sales-tax scheme that taxes general interest magazines, but exempts newspapers and religious, professional, trade, and sports journals, violates the First Amendment's freedom of the press guarantee.
