= Civil Rights Act of 1866 =

U.S. law defining citizenship and equal protection

- Long title: An Act to protect all Persons in the United States in their Civil Rights, and furnish the Means of their Vindication.
- Acronyms (colloquial): CRA 1866
- Enacted by: the 39th United States Congress
- Effective: April 9, 1866

Citations
- Statutes at Large: 14 Stat. 27

Legislative history
- Introduced in the Senate as S. 61 by Lyman Trumbull (R–IL) on January 5, 1866; Committee consideration by Judiciary; Passed the Senate on February 2, 1866 (33–12); Passed the House on March 13, 1866 (111–38); Vetoed by President Andrew Johnson on March 27, 1866; Overridden by the Senate on April 6, 1866 (33–15); Overridden by the House and became law on April 9, 1866 (122–41)

Major amendments
- Civil Rights Act of 1991 (Section 1981) P.L. 102–166

United States Supreme Court cases
- Jones v. Alfred H. Mayer Co., 392 U.S. 409 (1968); Sullivan v. Little Hunting Park, Inc., 396 U.S. 229 (1969); Johnson v. Railway Express Agency, Inc., 421 U.S. 454 (1975); Runyon v. McCrary, 427 U.S. 160 (1976); McDonald v. Santa Fe Trail Transp. Co., 427 U.S. 273 (1976); Memphis v. Greene, 451 U.S. 100 (1981); General Bldg. Contractors Assn., Inc. v. Pennsylvania, 458 U.S. 375 (1982); Saint Francis College v. al-Khazraji, 481 U.S. 604 (1987); Goodman v. Lukens Steel Co., 482 U.S. 656 (1987); Jett v. Dallas Independent School Dist., 491 U.S. 701 (1989); Jones v. RR Donnelley & Sons Co., 541 U.S. 369 (2004); Domino's Pizza, Inc. v. McDonald, 546 U.S. 470 (2006); CBOCS West, Inc. v. Humphries, 553 U.S. 442 (2008); Comcast v. National Association of African-American-Owned Media, No. 18-1171, 589 U.S. ___ (2020)

The Civil Rights Act of 1866 (14 Stat. 27, enacted April 9, 1866, reenacted 1870) was the first United States federal law to define citizenship and affirm that all citizens are equally protected by the law. It was mainly intended, in the wake of the American Civil War, to protect the civil rights of persons of African descent born in or brought to the United States.

The Act was passed by Congress in 1866 and vetoed by U.S. President Andrew Johnson. In April 1866, Congress again passed the bill to support the Thirteenth Amendment, and Johnson again vetoed it, but a two-thirds majority in each chamber overrode the veto to allow it to become law without presidential signature.

John Bingham and other congressmen argued that Congress did not yet have sufficient constitutional power to enact this law. Following passage of the Fourteenth Amendment in 1868, Congress ratified the 1866 Act in 1870.

== Primary objectives, introduction and amendment ==
The act had three primary objectives for the integration of African Americans into the American society following the Civil War: 1.) a broadened definition of American citizenship overturning the 1857 Dred Scott Supreme Court decision (but retaining some exceptions) 2.) attaching civil rights which flow from this citizenship and 3.) the unlawfulness to deprive any person of citizenship rights "on the basis of race, color, or prior condition of slavery or involuntary servitude." The act accomplished these three primary objectives.

The author of the Civil Rights Act of 1866 was United States Senator Lyman Trumbull. Congressman James F. Wilson summarized what he considered to be the purpose of the act as follows, when he introduced the legislation in the House of Representatives:

It provides for the equality of citizens of the United States in the enjoyment of "civil rights and immunities." What do these terms mean? Do they mean that in all things civil, social, political, all citizens, without distinction of race or color, shall be equal? By no means can they be so construed. Do they mean that all citizens shall vote in the several States? No; for suffrage is a political right which has been left under the control of the several States, subject to the action of Congress only when it becomes necessary to enforce the guarantee of a republican form of government. Nor do they mean that all citizens shall sit on the juries, or that their children shall attend the same schools. The definition given to the term "civil rights" in Bouvier's Law Dictionary is very concise, and is supported by the best authority. It is this: "Civil rights are those which have no relation to the establishment, support, or management of government."

During the subsequent legislative process, the following key provision was deleted: "there shall be no discrimination in civil rights or immunities among the inhabitants of any State or Territory of the United States on account of race, color, or previous condition of servitude." John Bingham was an influential supporter of this deletion, on the ground that courts might construe the term "civil rights" more broadly than people like Wilson intended. Weeks later, Senator Trumbull described the bill's intended scope:

This bill in no manner interferes with the municipal regulations of any State which protects all alike in their rights of person and property. It could have no operation in Massachusetts, New York, Illinois, or most of the States of the Union.

On April 5, 1866, the Senate overrode President Andrew Johnson's veto. This marked the first time that the U.S. Congress ever overrode a presidential veto for a major piece of legislation.

== Content ==
With an incipit of "An Act to protect all Persons in the United States in their Civil Rights, and furnish the Means of their vindication", the act declared that all people born in the United States who are not subject to any foreign power are entitled to be citizens, without regard to race, color, or previous condition of slavery or involuntary servitude. A similar provision (called the Citizenship Clause) was written a few months later into the proposed Fourteenth Amendment to the United States Constitution.

The Civil Rights Act of 1866 also said that any citizen has the same right that a white citizen has to make and enforce contracts, sue and be sued, give evidence in court, and inherit, purchase, lease, sell, hold, and convey real and personal property. Additionally, the act guaranteed to all citizens the "full and equal benefit of all laws and proceedings for the security of person and property, as is enjoyed by white citizens, and ... like punishment, pains, and penalties..." Persons who denied these rights on account of race or previous enslavement were guilty of a misdemeanor and upon conviction faced a fine not exceeding $1,000, or imprisonment not exceeding one year, or both.

The act used language very similar to that of the Equal Protection Clause in the newly proposed Fourteenth Amendment. In particular, the act discussed the need to provide "reasonable protection to all persons in their constitutional rights of equality before the law, without distinction of race or color, or previous condition of slavery or involuntary servitude, except as a punishment for crime, whereof the party shall have been duly convicted. ..."

This statute was a major part of general federal policy during Reconstruction, and was closely related to the Second Freedmen's Bureau Act of 1866. According to Congressman John Bingham, "the seventh and eighth sections of the Freedmen's Bureau bill enumerate the same rights and all the rights and privileges that are enumerated in the first section of this [the Civil Rights] bill."

Parts of the Civil Rights Act of 1866 are enforceable into the 21st century, according to the United States Code:

All persons within the jurisdiction of the United States shall have the same right in every State and Territory to make and enforce contracts, to sue, be parties, give evidence, and to the full and equal benefit of all laws and proceedings for the security of persons and property as is enjoyed by white citizens, and shall be subject to like punishment, pains, penalties, taxes, licenses, and exactions of every kind, and to no other.

One section of the United States Code (42 U.S.C. §1981), is §1 of the Civil Rights Act of 1866 as revised and amended by subsequent Acts of Congress. The Civil Rights Act of 1866 was reenacted by the Enforcement Act of 1870, ch. 114, § 18, 16 Stat. 144, codified as sections 1977 and 1978 of the Revised Statutes of 1874, and appears now as 42 U.S.C. §§ 1981–82 (1970). Section 2 of the Civil Rights Act of 1866, as subsequently revised and amended, appears in the US Code at 18 U.S.C. §242. After the fourteenth amendment became effective, the 1866 Act was reenacted as an addendum to the Enforcement Act of 1870 in order to dispel any possible doubt as to its constitutionality. Act of May 31, 1870, ch. 114, § 18, 16 Stat. 144.

== Enactment, constitutionalization, and reenactment ==
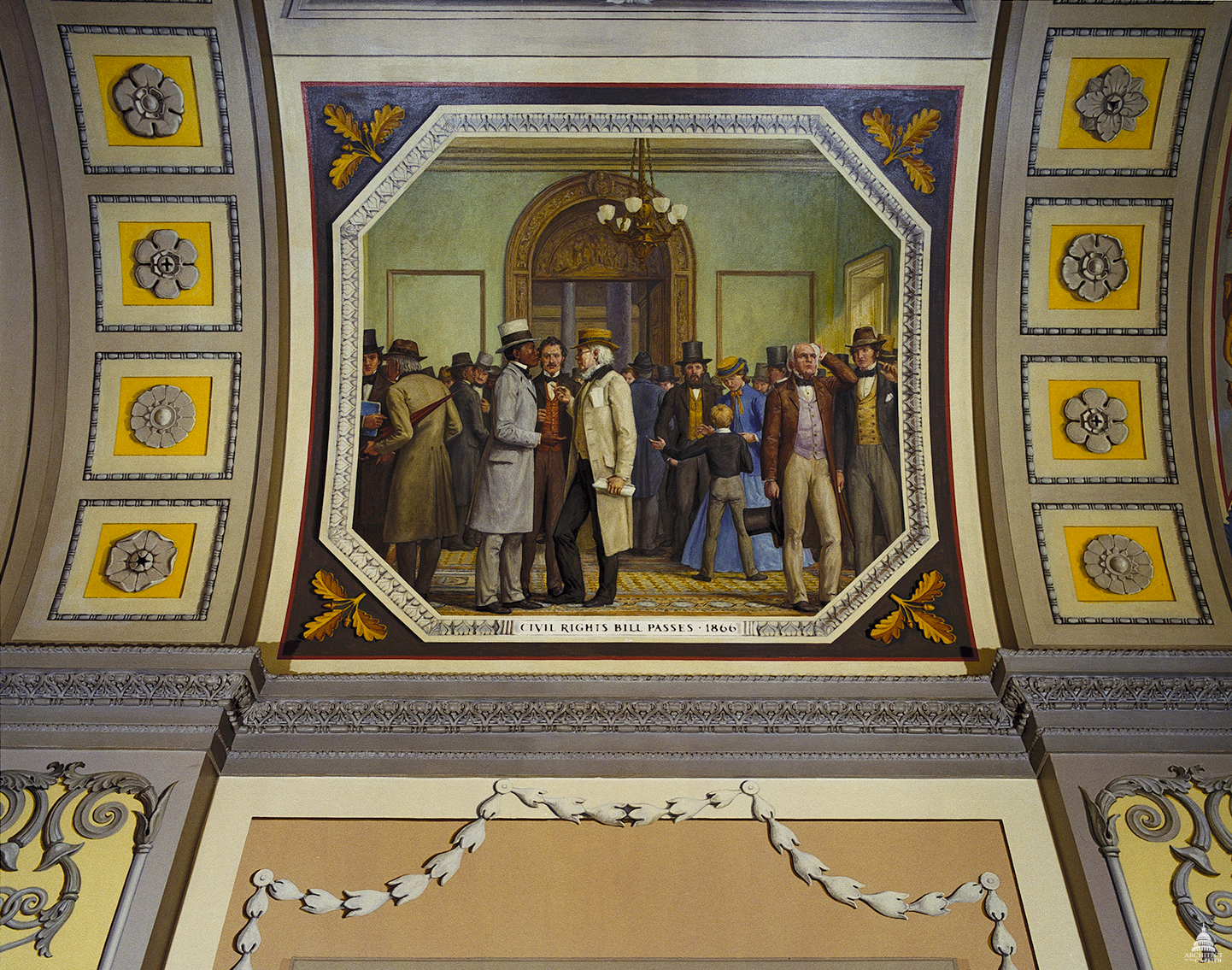
Mural of the passage of the act

Senator Lyman Trumbull was the Senate sponsor of the Civil Rights Act of 1866, and he argued that Congress had power to enact it in order to eliminate a discriminatory "badge of servitude" prohibited by the Thirteenth Amendment. Congressman John Bingham, principal author of the first section of the Fourteenth Amendment, was one of several Republicans who believed (prior to that Amendment) that Congress lacked power to pass the 1866 Act. In the 20th century, the U.S. Supreme Court ultimately adopted Trumbull's Thirteenth Amendment rationale for congressional power to ban racial discrimination by states and by private parties, as the Thirteenth Amendment does not require a state actor.

To the extent that the Civil Rights Act of 1866 may have been intended to go beyond preventing discrimination, by conferring particular rights on all citizens, the constitutional power of Congress to do that was more questionable. For example, Representative William Lawrence argued that Congress had power to enact the statute because of the Privileges and Immunities Clause in Article IV of the original unamended Constitution, even though courts had suggested otherwise.

In any event, there is currently no consensus that the language of the Civil Rights Act of 1866 actually purports to confer any legal benefits upon white citizens. Representative Samuel Shellabarger said that it did not.

After enactment of the Civil Rights Act of 1866 by overriding a presidential veto, some members of Congress supported the Fourteenth Amendment in order to eliminate doubts about the constitutionality of the Civil Rights Act of 1866, or to ensure that no subsequent Congress could later repeal or alter the main provisions of that Act. Thus, the Citizenship Clause in the Fourteenth Amendment parallels citizenship language in the Civil Rights Act of 1866, and likewise the Equal Protection Clause parallels nondiscrimination language in the 1866 Act; the extent to which other clauses in the Fourteenth Amendment may have incorporated elements of the Civil Rights Act of 1866 is a matter of continuing debate.

The Fourteenth Amendment was ratified in 1868. Two years later, the 1866 Act was reenacted as Section 18 of the Enforcement Act of 1870.

== Aftermath and consequences ==
After Johnson's veto was overridden, the measure became law. Despite this victory, even some Republicans who had supported the goals of the Civil Rights Act began to doubt that Congress possessed the constitutional power to turn those goals into laws. The experience encouraged both radical and moderate Republicans to seek Constitutional guarantees for black rights, rather than relying on temporary political majorities.

The activities of groups such as the Ku Klux Klan (KKK) undermined the act, meaning that it failed to immediately secure the civil rights of African Americans.

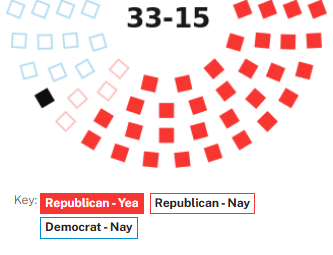
The vote breakdown in the US Senate by party of The Civil Rights Act of 1866

While it has been de jure illegal in the U.S. to discriminate in employment and housing on the basis of race since 1866, federal penalties were not provided for until the second half of the 20th century (with the passage of related civil rights legislation), which meant remedies were left to the individuals involved: because those being discriminated against had limited or no access to legal assistance, this often left many victims of discrimination without recourse.

There have been an increasing number of remedies provided under this act since the second half of the 20th century, including the landmark Jones v. Mayer and Sullivan v. Little Hunting Park, Inc. decisions in 1968.

== Legislative Breakdown ==
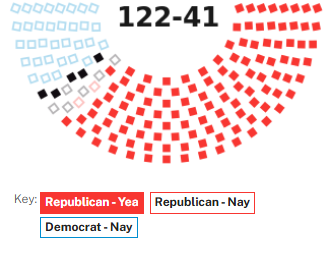
The vote breakdown in the US House by party of The Civil Rights Act of 1866

S. 61 was brought to a floor vote in the chambers of the US Senate on April 6, 1866. Three political parties were present. The Republican Party voted 32 in favor, 4 against. The Democratic Party voted 0 in favor, 11 against, and the Unconditional Unionists voted 1 in favor, 0 against. 1 member did not vote.

It was brought to a floor vote in the US House of Representatives on April 9, 1866. Four political parties were present to vote in the House of Representatives on the motion to pass S. 61. The Republican Party voted 117 in favor, 2 against. The Democratic Party voted 0 in favor, 33 against. The Unconditional Unionists voted 4 in favor, 0 against. 21 members did not vote.

== See also ==
- US labor law
- Civil right acts in the United States
- History of civil rights in the United States
- Black homesteaders

== Primary sources ==
- Samito, Christian G., ed. Changes in Law and Society During the Civil War and Reconstruction: A Legal History Documentary Reader (SIU Press, 2009).
