= Mandla v Dowell-Lee =

1982 UK legal case on racial discrimination

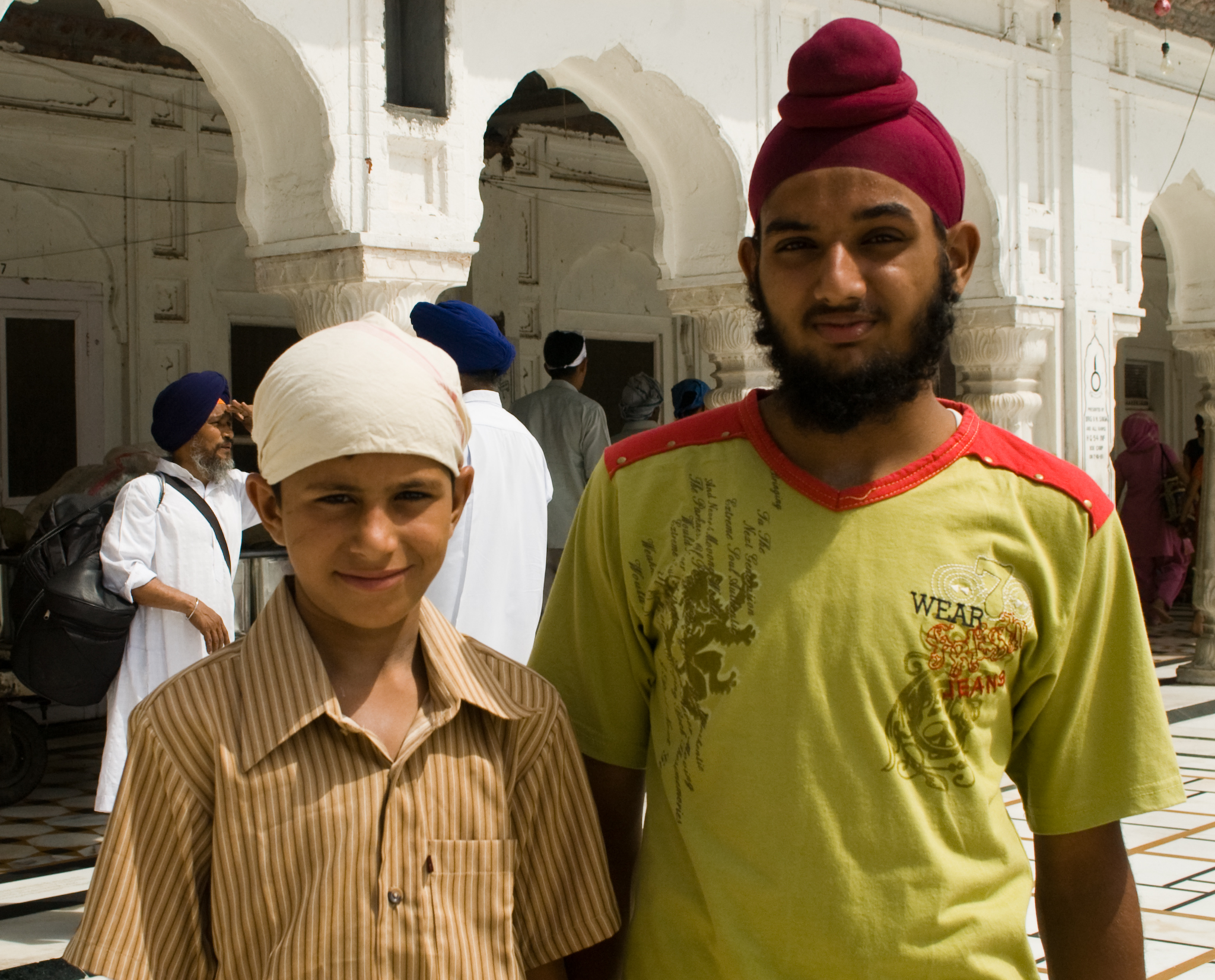
- A sikh wearing patka (right)
- Court: House of Lords
- Decided: 24 March 1983
- Citations: [1982] UKHL 7, [1983] 2 AC 548

Case history
- Prior action: [1983] QB 1

Court membership
- Judges sitting: Lord Fraser of Tullybelton, Lord Edmund-Davies, Lord Roskill, Lord Brandon of Oakbrook and Lord Templeman

Keywords
- Race discrimination, Sikh, protected characteristic, ethnicity

Mandla v Dowell-Lee [1982] UKHL 7 is a United Kingdom law case on racial discrimination. It held that Sikhs are to be considered an ethnic group for the purposes of the Race Relations Act 1976.

== Background ==
A Sikh boy was refused entry to Park Grove School, Birmingham by the headmaster because his father refused to make him stop wearing a dastar and cut his hair. The boy went to another school, but the father lodged a complaint with the Commission for Racial Equality (CRE), which brought the case. Derry Irvine, a future Lord Chancellor, appeared for the CRE.

== Judgment ==
=== Court of Appeal ===
The CRE lost in the Court of Appeal. Lord Denning, M. R. held the following:

The statute in section 3(1) contains a definition of a "racial group". It means a "group of persons defined by reference to colour, race, nationality or ethnic or national origins." That definition is very carefully framed. Most interesting is that it does not include religion or politics or culture. You can discriminate for or against Roman Catholics as much as you like without being in breach of the law. You can discriminate for or against Communists as much as you please, without being in breach of the law. You can discriminate for or against the "hippies" as much as you like, without being in breach of the law. But you must not discriminate against a man because of his colour or of his race or of his nationality, or of "his ethnic or national origins." You must remember that it is perfectly lawful to discriminate against groups of people to whom you object - so long as they are not a racial group. You can discriminate against the Moonies or the Skinheads or any other group which you dislike or to which you take objection. No matter whether your objection to them is reasonable or unreasonable, you can discriminate against them - without being in breach of the law.’

He held that Sikhs were not a racial or ethnic group.

=== House of Lords ===
The CRE won the Appeal to the House of Lords, where Lord Fraser of Tullybelton held the following.

For a group to constitute an ethnic group in the sense of the 1976 Act, it must, in my opinion, regard itself, and be regarded by others, as a distinct community by virtue of certain characteristics. Some of these characteristics are essential; others are not essential but one or more of them will commonly be found and will help to distinguish the group from the surrounding community. The conditions which appear to me to be essential are these: (1) a long shared history, of which the group is conscious as distinguishing it from other groups, and the memory of which it keeps alive; (2) a cultural tradition of its own, including family and social customs and manners, often but not necessarily associated with religious observance. In addition to those two essential characteristics the following characteristics are, in my opinion, relevant: (3) either a common geographical origin, or descent from a small number of common ancestors; (4) a common language, not necessarily peculiar to the group; (5) a common literature peculiar to the group; (6) a common religion different from that of neighbouring groups or from the general community surrounding it; (7) being a minority or being an oppressed or a dominant group within a larger community, for example a conquered people (say, the inhabitants of England shortly after the Norman conquest) and their conquerors might both be ethnic groups.

He went on to approve the test set out by Richardson, J. in the County Court.

"... a group is identifiable in terms of its ethnic origins if it is a segment of the population distinguished from others by a sufficient combination of shared customs, beliefs, traditions and characteristics derived from a common or presumed common past, even if not drawn from what in biological terms is a common racial stock. It is that combination which gives them an historically determined social identity in their own eyes and in the eyes of those outside the group. They have a distinct social identity based not simply on group cohesion and solidarity but also on their belief as to their historical antecedents."

They held that Sikhs were a racial or ethnic group.

== Significance ==
The outcome of this case has been that it has led to a legal definition of the term ethno-religious.

== See also ==
- UK employment discrimination law
- UK labour law
- Human Rights Act 1998
- Equality Act 2010
- Shaare Tefila Congregation v. Cobb 481 U.S. 615 (1987), similar US case relating to Jews.
