= Pope v. Illinois =

- Supreme Court of the United States

Argued February 24, 1987 Decided May 4, 1987
- Full case name: Richard Pope and Charles G. Morrison, Petitioners, v. Illinois
- Citations: 481 U.S. 497 (more) 107 S. Ct. 1918, 95 L.Ed.2d 439
- Argument: Oral argument

Holding
- In a prosecution for the sale of allegedly obscene materials, the jury should not be instructed to apply community standards in deciding the value question. Only the first and second prongs of the Miller test -- appeal to prurient interest and patent offensiveness -- should be decided with reference to "contemporary community standards."

Court membership
- Chief Justice William Rehnquist Associate Justices William J. Brennan Jr. · Byron White; Thurgood Marshall · Harry Blackmun; Lewis F. Powell Jr. · John P. Stevens; Sandra Day O'Connor · Antonin Scalia

Case opinions
- Majority: White, joined by Rehnquist, Powell, O'Connor, Scalia; Blackmun (Parts I and II)
- Concurrence: Scalia
- Concur/dissent: Blackmun
- Dissent: Brennan
- Dissent: Stevens, joined by Marshall; Brennan (except for note 11); Blackmun (Part I)

Pope v. Illinois, 481 U.S. 497 (1987), was a United States Supreme Court case decided in 1987. In this case, the Court held that the "value" prong, which is the third prong of the Miller test established in Supreme Court's 1973 case Miller v. California, must be assessed based on a "reasonable person" standard. In contrast, the Court's decision in Pope reiterated its holding in the 1977 case Smith v. United States that the first and second prongs of the Miller test — "appeal to prurient interest" and "patent offensiveness" — must be decided based on "contemporary community standards".
