= Young v. United States ex rel. Vuitton et Fils S.A. =

- Supreme Court of the United States

Argued January 13, 1987 Decided May 26, 1987
- Full case name: Gerald J. Young, George Cariste, Sol W. Klayminc, and Nathan Helfand v. United States, ex rel. Vuitton et Fils S.A., et al.; Barry Dean Klayminc v. United States, ex rel. Vuitton et Fils S.A., et al.
- Docket nos.: 85-1329; 85-6207
- Citations: 481 U.S. 787 (more) 107 S. Ct. 2124, 95 L. Ed. 2d 740
- Argument: Oral argument

Case history
- Prior: 780 F.2d 179 (2d Cir. 1985); cert. granted, 477 U.S. 903 (1986)

Holding
- Courts have inherent authority to appoint an attorney to initiate a contempt proceeding, without relying on the executive branch, but it must be a disinterested attorney.

Court membership
- Chief Justice William Rehnquist Associate Justices William J. Brennan Jr. · Byron White; Thurgood Marshall · Harry Blackmun; Lewis F. Powell Jr. · John P. Stevens; Sandra Day O'Connor · Antonin Scalia

Case opinions
- Majority: Brennan (Parts I, II, III-A, and IV), joined by Rehnquist, Marshall, Blackmun, Powell, Stevens, O'Connor
- Plurality: Brennan (Part III-B), joined by Marshall, Blackmun, Stevens
- Concurrence: Blackmun
- Concurrence: Scalia (concurring in the judgment)
- Concur/dissent: Powell, joined by Rehnquist, O'Connor
- Dissent: White

Young v. United States ex rel. Vuitton et Fils S.A., 481 U.S. 787 (1987), was a United States Supreme Court case about the appointment of private attorneys to prosecute criminal contempt for violating an injunction. The Supreme Court held that courts have inherent authority to appoint attorneys to initiate contempt proceedings, without relying on the executive branch. However, because of conflict-of-interest concerns, a federal court can only appoint a "disinterested" attorney, not an attorney who is also counsel to a party involved in the underlying court order.

== Background ==
The fashion company Louis Vuitton brought a lawsuit against alleged counterfeiters of its products. As part of a settlement agreement, defendants were enjoined from infringing Louis Vuitton's trademark. Vuitton suspected continued infringement, and began a sting operation, making undercover arrangements to buy counterfeit products from the defendants.

Based on early results of the sting, Vuitton's attorneys Bainton and Devlin persuaded the district court to find probable cause for contempt of the injunction, and to appoint themselves as special counsel to continue the investigation and prosecute the contempt. One week after his appointment, Bainton notified the US Attorney's office, which replied to say good luck and took no other action.

After a jury trial, defendants were found guilty, with sentences ranging between six months and five years. The convictions were affirmed by the U.S. Court of Appeals for the Second Circuit, which held that the appointment of Vuitton's attorneys to prosecute the contempt did not violate defendants' rights.

== Supreme Court ==
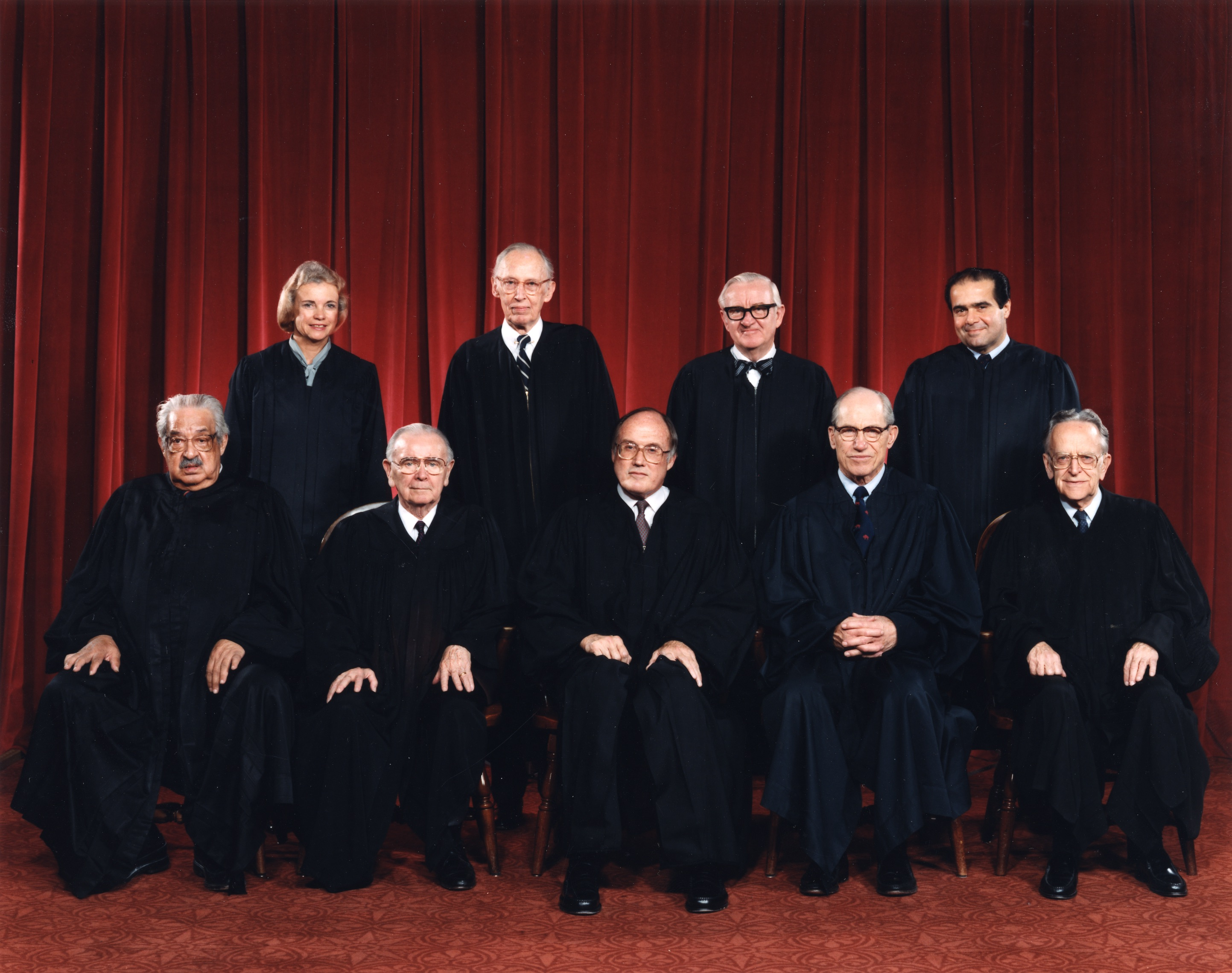
The Rehnquist Court

The Supreme Court addressed two main issues. Eight justices (all except Justice Scalia) upheld the district court's power to appoint attorneys to prosecute contempt. Another eight justices (all except Justice White) agreed that Louis Vuitton's counsel could not be appointed to prosecute contempt of an injunction meant to protect Louis Vuitton. Additional separate opinions addressed other disagreements.

=== Opinion of the court ===
In a majority opinion by Justice William Brennan for seven justices, the court first decided that private attorneys may be appointed to prosecute contempt. Petitioners had argued that contempt proceedings could only be initiated by the United States Attorney in the executive branch. Rejecting this view, the court found that "it is long settled that courts possess inherent authority to initiate contempt proceedings for disobedience to their orders, authority which necessarily encompasses the ability to appoint a private attorney to prosecute the contempt." This authority is part of the judicial power, and required for the judicial branch to protect itself.

The court cautioned judges to show restraint in using their contempt powers, and to appoint a private attorney to prosecute contempt only after the executive branch declines a request to prosecute. In passing, the court noted that no such referral was made to the US Attorney here, but did not decide the case on this basis.

While permitting private prosecutors to be appointed, the court required such an attorney to be "as disinterested as a public prosecutor". Once appointed, the attorneys represented the United States, not the party to the original civil case. If the attorney also represents an interested private client, their ethical obligations could conflict with their role as prosecutors. The appearance of impropriety is not dispelled by the initial role of the judge in making the appointment, because of the prosecutor's wide discretion involved in conducting the prosecution.

=== Harmless error: Brennan's opinion and Powell's partial dissent ===
Most of Justice Brennan's opinion was for a seven-justice majority, except that three of the seven would have instead remanded to the court below to apply a harmless error analysis. In the part of Brennan's opinion joined by only three other justices, he wrote that the failure to appoint a disinterested attorney required reversal and could never be deemed harmless error. (Justice Scalia's concurrence in the judgment provided the fifth vote to reverse, for different reasons.) Justice Powell and two other justices would have remanded for a harmless error analysis, suggesting that the appointment, though improper, might not warrant vacating the conviction.

=== Blackmun's concurrence ===
Justice Harry Blackmun joined the majority, but in addition would have found that a disinterested prosecutor was a constitutional right as part of due process. In contrast, the majority opinion relied only on the Supreme Court's supervisory power over other federal courts, which meant that it was not a constitutional holding and did not bind state courts.

=== Scalia's concurrence in the judgment ===
Justice Antonin Scalia argued that federal courts have no power to prosecute contempt when their judgments are disobeyed, and no power to appoint attorneys to do so. Prosecution is executive power. ("At least to the extent that it is publicly exercised", he added; in a footnote, he left open the possibility of criminal prosecution by private individuals and not by the government at all.) Prosecution is not judicial power, which Scalia defined as "the power to decide, in accordance with law, who should prevail in a case or controversy".

Scalia accepted that each branch of government has an inherent power of self-protection, but found it narrower than the majority's conception. He distinguished the "functioning" of courts from "the product of their functioning, their judgments". In his view, courts may have implicit power to protect their own proceedings, such as prosecuting contempt of a subpoena to produce documents. For judgments to be effective, though, the judicial branch depends on the executive, and this dependence is an intentional feature of the constitution.

=== White's dissent ===
Justice Byron White's brief opinion concluded that interested private attorneys may be appointed to prosecute contempt.
