= Bruton v. United States =

- Supreme Court of the United States

Argued March 11, 1968 Decided May 20, 1968
- Full case name: Bruton v. United States
- Citations: 391 U.S. 123 (more) 88 S. Ct. 1620; 20 L. Ed. 2d 476

Court membership
- Chief Justice Earl Warren Associate Justices Hugo Black · William O. Douglas; John M. Harlan II · William J. Brennan Jr. Potter Stewart · Byron White; Abe Fortas · Thurgood Marshall

Case opinions
- Majority: Brennan, joined by Warren, Douglas, Stewart, Fortas
- Concurrence: Stewart
- Concurrence: Black (in judgment)
- Dissent: White, joined by Harlan
- Dissent: Harlan
- Marshall took no part in the consideration or decision of the case.

Laws applied
- U.S. Const. amend. VI
- This case overturned a previous ruling or rulings
- Delli Paoli v. United States, 352 U.S. 232 (1957)

Bruton v. United States, 391 U.S. 123 (1968), is a 1968 United States Supreme Court ruling in which the Court held that a defendant was deprived of his rights under the Confrontation Clause if a confession by his codefendant was introduced in their joint trial, regardless of whether the jury received instructions only to consider it against the confessor. This has become known as the Bruton rule. The case overruled Delli Paoli v. United States (1957).

== Reasoning ==
As the basis for its holding, the Supreme Court stated that "There are some contexts in which the risk that the jury will not, or cannot, follow instructions is so great, and the consequences of failure so vital to the defendant, that the practical and human limitations of the jury system cannot be ignored. Such a context is presented here, where the powerfully incriminating extrajudicial statements of a codefendant, who stands accused side-by-side with the defendant, are deliberately spread before the jury in a joint trial. Not only are the incriminations devastating to the defendant but their credibility is inevitably suspect . . . . The unreliability of such evidence is intolerably compounded when the alleged accomplice, as here, does not testify and cannot be tested by cross-examination."

== See also ==
- Cruz v. New York (1987)
