= Saint Francis College v. al-Khazraji =

- Supreme Court of the United States

Argued February 25, 1987 Decided May 18, 1987
- Full case name: Saint Francis College v. al-Khazraji
- Citations: 481 U.S. 604 (more) 107 S. Ct. 2022; 95 L. Ed. 2d 582; 1987 U.S. LEXIS 2054

Holding
- Persons of Arabian ancestry are protected from racial discrimination under Section 1981.

Court membership
- Chief Justice William Rehnquist Associate Justices William J. Brennan Jr. · Byron White; Thurgood Marshall · Harry Blackmun; Lewis F. Powell Jr. · John P. Stevens; Sandra Day O'Connor · Antonin Scalia

Case opinions
- Majority: White, joined by unanimous
- Concurrence: Brennan

Laws applied
- 42 U.S.C. § 1981 (Civil Rights Act of 1866)

Saint Francis College v. al-Khazraji, 481 U.S. 604 (1987), is a United States labor law case decided by the United States Supreme Court.

== Facts ==
Al-Khazraji, a professor and U.S. citizen born in Iraq, filed suit against his former employer and its tenure committee for denying him tenure on the basis of his Arabian race in violation of 42 U.S.C. § 1981. The District Court held that while Al-Kharzraji had properly alleged racial discrimination, the record was insufficient to determine whether he had been subjected to prejudice by Saint Francis College.

The question posed was "Does 42 U.S.C. Section 1981 apply to Arab minorities?"

== Judgment ==
In response to this question the Court held that persons of Arabian ancestry were protected from racial discrimination under Section 1981. Writing for a unanimous Court, Justice White maintained that section 1981 encompassed discrimination even among Caucasians. Justice White noted that history did not support the claim that Arabs and other present-day "Caucasians" were considered to be a single race for the purposes of section 1981.

Justice Brennan, in a separate concurrence, discussed the difference between discrimination based on ancestry and discrimination based on birthplace. For many people, these are the same, but that is not a universal experience. In Brennan's view, the decision did not allow people to sue based on birthplace discrimination alone.

== Significance ==
In the companion case, Shaare Tefila Congregation v. Cobb, a unanimous Court ruled that the Civil Rights Act of 1866 likewise applies to discrimination against Jews.

== See also ==
- United States labor law
- Civil Rights Act of 1866
- List of United States Supreme Court cases, volume 481
- List of United States Supreme Court cases
- Lists of United States Supreme Court cases by volume
- List of United States Supreme Court cases by the Rehnquist Court.
