= Hodel v. Irving =

- Supreme Court of the United States

Argued October 6, 1986 Decided May 18, 1987
- Full case name: Hodel, Secretary of the Interior v. Irving et al.
- Citations: 481 U.S. 704 (more) 107 S. Ct. 2076; 95 L. Ed. 2d 668

Case history
- Prior: Irving v. Clark, 758 F.2d 1260 (8th Cir. 1985); probable jurisdiction noted, 474 U.S. 1049 (1986).

Holding
- The original version of § 207 of the Indian Land Consolidation Act effected a "taking" of appellees' decedents' property without just compensation.

Court membership
- Chief Justice William Rehnquist Associate Justices William J. Brennan Jr. · Byron White; Thurgood Marshall · Harry Blackmun; Lewis F. Powell Jr. · John P. Stevens; Sandra Day O'Connor · Antonin Scalia

Case opinions
- Majority: O'Connor, joined by Rehnquist, Brennan, Marshall, Blackmun, Powell, Scalia
- Concurrence: Brennan, joined by Marshall, Blackmun
- Concurrence: Scalia, joined by Rehnquist, Powell
- Concurrence: Stevens, joined by White

Laws applied
- U.S. Const. amend. V

Hodel v. Irving, 481 U.S. 704 (1987), is a case in which the U.S. Supreme Court held that a statute ordering the escheat of fractional interests in real property which had been bequeathed to members of the Oglala Sioux tribe was an unconstitutional taking which required just compensation.

== Background ==
Towards the end of the 19th century, Congress enacted a series of land Acts which divided the communal reservations of Indian tribes into individual allotments for Indians and unallotted lands for non-Indian settlement. This legislation was motivated both by a desire to force Indians to abandon their nomadic ways in order to "speed the Indians' assimilation into American society", and by pressure to free new lands for further white settlement. One of these statutes, enacted in 1889, allotted each male Sioux head of household 320 acres (1.3 km^{2}) of land and most other individuals 160 acres (0.65 km^{2}), with the land to be held in trust by the United States. Prior to 1910, the lands of deceased allottees passed to their heirs "according to the laws of the State or Territory" where the land was located. After 1910, allottees were permitted to dispose of their interests by will in accordance with regulations promulgated by the Secretary of the Interior, which were intended to protect Native American ownership of the allotted lands.

Unfortunately, this policy of promoting private ownership of land among the Sioux had disastrous consequences. Instead of working the land themselves, the Sioux sold, or more frequently leased, the lands to whites, and lived off the meager revenues. Worse yet, each successive generation found their parcels became splintered into multiple undivided interests in land, with many parcels having dozens (and in some cases, hundreds) of owners. Because the land was held in trust and often could not be alienated or partitioned, the fractionation problem grew steadily worse over time. Financial returns from the leased lands were divided up among so many parties that the holders of the fractionated interests would get as little as one cent from their holdings, and the administrative costs of bookkeeping and monitoring all of the fractional interests was economically unfeasible.

Congress ended the practice of land allotment in 1934, but this did little to alleviate the ownership problems which already existed, and continued to get worse with each passing generation of Sioux. In hopes of finally solving the fractionation problem, Congress passed the Indian Land Consolidation Act in 1983. Section 207 of the act provided that:

No undivided fractional interest in any tract of trust or restricted land within a tribe's reservation or otherwise subjected to a tribe's jurisdiction shall descedent [sic] by intestacy or devise but shall escheat to that tribe if such interest represents 2 per centum or less of the total acreage in such tract and has earned to its owner less than $100 in the preceding year before it is due to escheat.

The statute did not make any provisions for the payment of compensation to the holders of the fractional interests which were to escheat to the tribe.

== Facts and procedural history ==
The plaintiffs in this case were three enrolled members of the Oglala Sioux tribe: Mary Irving, Patrick Pumpkin Seed, and Eileen Bissonette. All of them were heirs or devisees of deceased tribe members. Irving lost two escheatable interests worth approximately $100, Pumpkin Seed lost 13 escheatable interests worth $1,816, and Bissonette lost $2,700 on the 26 escheatable interests in she was devised.

The plaintiffs filed suit against Donald P. Hodel, in his official capacity as Secretary of the Interior, in the United States District Court for the District of South Dakota. The District Court found for the government, holding that the plaintiffs had no vested interest in the property of the decedents prior to their deaths, and that Congress had plenary authority to abolish the power of testamentary disposition of Indian property and to alter the rules of intestate succession, and concluded that the statute was constitutional.

On appeal, the Eighth Circuit Court of Appeals reversed, holding that the statute violated the plaintiff's rights under the Takings Clause of the Fifth Amendment. While the Eighth Circuit agreed with the District Court that the plaintiffs did not have vested rights in the decedents' property, it concluded that their decedents had a right, derived from the original Sioux allotment statute, to control disposition of their property at death. The government sought certiorari, which was granted.

== Decision ==
=== Majority opinion ===
Justice O'Connor, writing for the majority, first held that the plaintiffs had standing to challenge the statute. Even though they were not asserting their own property rights, the fact that their decedents had been denied the right to devise their property by will or intestacy created a sufficient injury-in-fact for the plaintiffs to bring suit.

She then moved on to the substantive issue of the case. O'Connor agreed with the government that the fractionation of ownership was a serious problem, which Congress did have the power to ameliorate. She also agreed that the Sioux probably lost no "investment-backed expectations" under the test set forth in Penn Central Transportation Co. v. New York City (1978). However, she held that the right to will one’s property to one's heirs is one of the most important "sticks in the bundle" under Anglo-American common law, and that the total abrogation of this right constitutes a taking.

=== Concurring opinions ===
Justice Brennan and Justice Scalia each wrote a brief, single-paragraph concurring opinion, both of which analogized the rights lost by the plaintiffs in this case to those lost under the Eagle feather law.

Justice Stevens concurred in the judgment, and wrote the longest concurrence. His chief objection to the statute is that it afforded no opportunity for the plaintiffs' decedents to avoid escheat by consolidating their property through voluntary inter vivos transfers (for example, by providing a grace period before the statute came into force), thus violating their due process rights.

== See also ==
- List of United States Supreme Court cases, volume 481
- List of United States Supreme Court cases
- Lists of United States Supreme Court cases by volume
- List of United States Supreme Court cases by the Rehnquist Court
