= List of United States Supreme Court cases, volume 481 =

This is a list of all United States Supreme Court cases from volume 481 of the United States Reports:

Case name	Citation	Date decided
Pennzoil Co. v. Texaco Inc.	481 U.S. 1	1987
West v. Conrail	481 U.S. 35	1987
Pilot Life Ins. Co. v. Dedeaux	481 U.S. 41	1987
Metro. Life Ins. Co. v. Taylor	481 U.S. 58	1987
CTS Corp. v. Dynamics Corp.	481 U.S. 69	1987
United States v. John Doe, Inc. I	481 U.S. 102	1987
Granberry v. Greer	481 U.S. 129	1987
Tison v. Arizona	481 U.S. 137	1987
Cruz v. New York	481 U.S. 186	1987
Richardson v. Marsh	481 U.S. 200	1987
Ark. Writers' Project, Inc. v. Ragland	481 U.S. 221	1987
United States v. Gen. Dynamics Corp.	481 U.S. 239	1987
Brock v. Roadway Express, Inc.	481 U.S. 252	1987
McCleskey v. Kemp	481 U.S. 279	1987
Lukhard v. Reed	481 U.S. 368	1987
Hitchcock v. Dugger	481 U.S. 393	1987
Montana v. Hall	481 U.S. 400	1987
Tull v. United States	481 U.S. 412	1987
Burlington N.R. Co. v. Maintenance of Way Employees	481 U.S. 429	1987
Burlington N.R. Co. v. Okla. Tax Comm'n	481 U.S. 454	1987
Meese v. Keene	481 U.S. 465	1987
Pope v. Illinois	481 U.S. 497	1987
Arizona v. Mauro	481 U.S. 520	1987
Bd. of Directors v. Rotary Club	481 U.S. 537	1987
Pennsylvania v. Finley	481 U.S. 551	1987
NLRB v. Electrical Workers	481 U.S. 573	1987
Saint Francis Coll. v. Al-Khazraji	481 U.S. 604	1987
Shaare Tefila Congregation v. Cobb	481 U.S. 615	1987
Rose v. Rose	481 U.S. 619	1987
Gray v. Mississippi	481 U.S. 648	1987
United States v. Johnson	481 U.S. 681	1987
Hodel v. Irving	481 U.S. 704	1987
Pension Benefit Guar. Corp. v. Yahn & McDonnell, Inc.	481 U.S. 735	1987
Ray v. United States	481 U.S. 736	1987
van Drasek v. Webb	481 U.S. 738	1987
United States v. Salerno	481 U.S. 739	1987
Hilton v. Braunskill	481 U.S. 770	1987
Young v. United States ex rel. Vuitton et Fils S.A.	481 U.S. 787	1987
United States v. Mendoza-Lopez	481 U.S. 828	1987
Electrical Workers v. Hechler	481 U.S. 851	1987
Postal Serv. v. Letter Carriers	481 U.S. 1301	1987
