= List of United States Supreme Court cases involving Indian tribes =

This is a list of U.S. Supreme Court cases involving Native American Tribes, a body of court cases historically called Indian Law, though the term Indian is not currently accepted by most indigenous groups and is considered offensive to many.

Included in the list are Supreme Court cases that have a major component that deals with the relationship between tribes, between a governmental entity and tribes, tribal sovereignty, tribal rights (including property, hunting, fishing, religion, etc.) and actions involving members of tribes. Cases are sorted into general areas of Native American law, with a chronological listing at the end of the article.

== Citizenship ==
=== Adoption ===
- Fisher v. District Court, 424 U.S. 382 (1976)
- Mississippi Band of Choctaw Indians v. Holyfield, 490 U.S. 30 (1989)
- Adoptive Couple v. Baby Girl, 570 U.S. 637 (2013)
- Haaland v. Brackeen, 599 U.S. 255 (2023)

=== Tribal ===
- Ex parte Joins, 191 U.S. 93 (1903)
- Santa Clara Pueblo v. Martinez, 436 U.S. 49 (1978)
- Mississippi Band of Choctaw Indians v. Holyfield, 490 U.S. 30 (1989)
- South Dakota v. Bourland, 508 U.S. 679 (1993)

=== United States ===
- Elk v. Wilkins, 112 U.S. 94 (1884)
- United States v. Nice, 241 U.S. 591 (1916)

== Civil rights ==
- Elk v. Wilkins, 112 U.S. 94 (1884)
- Talton v. Mayes, 163 U.S. 376 (1896)
- Bad Elk v. United States, 177 U.S. 529 (1900)
- United States v. Antelope, 430 U.S. 641 (1977)
- Oliphant v. Suquamish Indian Tribe, 435 U.S. 191 (1978)
- United States v. Wheeler, 435 U.S. 313 (1978)

== Congressional authority ==
- Lone Wolf v. Hitchcock, 187 U.S. 553 (1903)
- Ex parte Joins, 191 U.S. 93 (1903)
- United States v. Nice, 241 U.S. 591 (1916)
- Williams v. Lee, 358 U.S. 217 (1959)
- Antoine v. Washington, 420 U.S. 194 (1975)
- Delaware Tribal Business Committee v. Weeks, 430 U.S. 73 (1977)
- White Mountain Apache Tribe v. Bracker, 448 U.S. 136 (1980)
- United States v. Sioux Nation of Indians, 448 U.S. 371 (1980)
- California v. Cabazon Band of Mission Indians, 480 U.S. 202 (1987)
- South Dakota v. Bourland, 508 U.S. 679 (1993)
- United States v. Lara, 541 U.S. 193 (2004)

== Contract law ==
- Cherokee Nation of Oklahoma v. Leavitt, 543 U.S. 631 (2005)
- Salazar v. Ramah Navajo Chapter, 567 U.S. 182 (2012)
- Menominee Tribe of Wis. v. United States, 577 U.S. 250 (2016)
- Becerra v. San Carlos Apache Tribe, 602 U.S. 222 (2024)

== Gambling ==
- California v. Cabazon Band of Mission Indians, 480 U.S. 202 (1987)
- Chickasaw Nation v. United States, 534 U.S. 84 (2001)
- Ysleta del Sur Pueblo v. Texas, 596 U.S. 685 (2022)

== Hunting and fishing rights ==
- Ward v. Race Horse, 163 U.S. 504 (1896)
- Menominee Tribe v. United States, 391 U.S. 404 (1968)
- Antoine v. Washington, 420 U.S. 194 (1975)
- New Mexico v. Mescalero Apache Tribe, 462 U.S. 324 (1983)
- Oregon Dept. of Fish and Wildlife v. Klamath Indian Tribe, 473 U.S. 753 (1985)
- Brendale v. Confederated Yakima Indian Nation, 492 U.S. 408 (1989)
- South Dakota v. Bourland, 508 U.S. 679 (1993)
- Washington v. United States, 584 U.S. 837 (2018)
- Herrera v. Wyoming, 587 U.S. 329 (2019)

== Jurisdiction ==
- Iowa Mutual Insurance Co. v. LaPlante, 480 U.S. 9 (1987)
- California v. Cabazon Band of Mission Indians, 480 U.S. 202 (1987)
- Mississippi Band of Choctaw Indians v. Holyfield, 490 U.S. 30 (1989)
- South Dakota v. Bourland, 508 U.S. 679 (1993)

=== Criminal ===
- United States v. McBratney, 104 U.S. 621 (1881)
- Ex parte Crow Dog, 109 U.S. 556 (1883)
- United States v. Kagama, 118 U.S. 375 (1886)
- United States v. Ramsey, 271 U.S. 467 (1926)
- United States v. Antelope, 430 U.S. 641 (1977)
- United States v. Wheeler, 435 U.S. 313 (1978)
- United States v. John, 437 U.S. 634 (1978)
- Solem v. Bartlett, 465 U.S. 463 (1984)
- Duro v. Reina, 495 U.S. 676 (1990)
- United States v. Lara, 541 U.S. 193 (2004)
- McGirt v. Oklahoma, 591 U.S. 894 (2020)
- Sharp v. Murphy, 591 U.S. 977 (2020)
- United States v. Cooley, 593 U.S. 345 (2021)
- Oklahoma v. Castro-Huerta, 597 U.S. 629 (2022)

=== Federal ===
- United States v. McBratney, 104 U.S. 621 (1881)
- United States v. Rogers, 45 U.S. (4 How.) 567 (1846)
- Ex parte Crow Dog, 109 U.S. 556 (1883)
- United States v. Kagama, 118 U.S. 375 (1886)
- United States v. Ramsey, 271 U.S. 467 (1926)
- United States v. John, 437 U.S. 634 (1978)
- National Farmers Union Ins. Cos. v. Crow Tribe, 468 U.S. 1315 (1984)
- United States v. Lara, 541 U.S. 193 (2004)
- United States v. Bryant, 579 U.S. 140 (2016)
- Denezpi v. United States, 596 U.S. 591 (2022)

=== Over non-Indians ===
- United States v. McBratney, 104 U.S. 621 (1881)
- United States v. Ramsey, 271 U.S. 467 (1926)
- Oliphant v. Suquamish Indian Tribe, 435 U.S. 191 (1978)
- Montana v. United States, 450 U.S. 544 (1981)
- New Mexico v. Mescalero Apache Tribe, 462 U.S. 324 (1983)
- National Farmers Union Ins. Cos. v. Crow Tribe, 468 U.S. 1315 (1984)
- Iowa Mutual Insurance Co. v. LaPlante, 480 U.S. 9 (1987)
- California v. Cabazon Band of Mission Indians, 480 U.S. 202 (1987)
- Duro v. Reina, 495 U.S. 676 (1990)
- Strate v. A-1 Contractors, 520 U.S. 438 (1997)
- Plains Commerce Bank v. Long Family Land & Cattle Co., 556 U.S. 287 (2008)
- Dollar General Corp. v. Mississippi Band of Choctaw Indians, 579 U.S. 545 (2016)
- United States v. Cooley, 593 U.S. 345 (2021)

=== State ===
- Williams v. Lee, 358 U.S. 217 (1959)
- Antoine v. Washington, 420 U.S. 194 (1975)
- United States v. John, 437 U.S. 634 (1978)
- Washington v. Confederated Bands and Tribes of the Yakima Indian Nation, 439 U.S. 463 (1979)
- White Mountain Apache Tribe v. Bracker, 448 U.S. 136 (1980)
- Montana v. United States, 450 U.S. 544 (1981)
- Montana v. Blackfeet Tribe, 471 U.S. 759 (1985)
- Rice v. Rehner, 463 U.S. 713 (1983)
- Solem v. Bartlett, 465 U.S. 463 (1984)
- Three Affiliated Tribes of Fort Berthold Reservation v. Wold Engineering, P. C., 467 U.S. 138 (1984)
- Iowa Mutual Insurance Co. v. LaPlante, 480 U.S. 9 (1987)
- California v. Cabazon Band of Mission Indians, 480 U.S. 202 (1987)
- Inyo County v. Paiute-Shoshone Indians of the Bishop Community, 538 U.S. 701 (2003)
- McGirt v. Oklahoma, 591 U.S. 894 (2020)
- Sharp v. Murphy, 591 U.S. 977 (2020)
- Ysleta del Sur Pueblo v. Texas, 596 U.S. 685 (2022)
- Oklahoma v. Castro-Huerta, 597 U.S. 629 (2022)

== Liquor ==
- Sarlls v. United States, 152 U.S. 570 (1894)
- United States v. Nice, 241 U.S. 591 (1916)
- Rice v. Rehner, 463 U.S. 713 (1983)

== Property rights ==
- Johnson v. McIntosh, 21 U.S. 543 (1823)
- United States v. Sandoval, 231 U.S. 28 (1913)
- Oklahoma Tax Commission v. United States, 319 U.S. 598 (1943)
- United States v. Southern Ute Tribe or Band of Indians, 402 U.S. 159 (1971)
- United States v. Sioux Nation of Indians, 448 U.S. 371 (1980)
- Rice v. Rehner, 463 U.S. 713 (1983)
- Hodel v. Irving, 481 U.S. 704 (1987)
- Brendale v. Confederated Yakima Indian Nation, 492 U.S. 408 (1989)
- Oklahoma Tax Commission v. Citizen Band, Potawatomi Indian Tribe of Oklahoma, 498 U.S. 505 (1991)
- Yakima v. Confederated Tribes, 502 U.S. 251 (1992)
- South Dakota v. Bourland, 508 U.S. 679 (1993)
- Plains Commerce Bank v. Long Family Land and Cattle Co., Inc., 556 U.S. 287 (2008)

=== Allotment ===
- Lone Wolf v. Hitchcock, 187 U.S. 553 (1903)
- Arenas v. United States, 322 U.S. 419 (1944)
- Solem v. Bartlett, 465 U.S. 463 (1984)
- Brendale v. Confederated Yakima Indian Nation, 492 U.S. 408 (1989)
- Yakima v. Confederated Tribes, 502 U.S. 251 (1992)
- Plains Commerce Bank v. Long Family Land and Cattle Co., Inc., 556 U.S. 287 (2008)

=== Mineral rights ===
- United States v. Shoshone Tribe of Indians, 304 U.S. 111 (1938)
- Merrion v. Jicarilla Apache Tribe, 455 U.S. 130 (1982)
- Idaho v. United States, 533 U.S. 262 (2001)

== Reservations ==
- United States v. McBratney, 104 U.S. 621 (1881)
- United States v. Sandoval, 231 U.S. 28 (1913)
- United States v. Southern Ute Tribe or Band of Indians, 402 U.S. 159 (1971)
- McClanahan v. Arizona State Tax Comm'n, 411 U.S. 164 (1973)
- Oliphant v. Suquamish Indian Tribe, 435 U.S. 191 (1978)
- Washington v. Confederated Bands and Tribes of the Yakima Indian Nation, 439 U.S. 463 (1979)
- Washington v. Confederated Tribes of Colville Reservation, 447 U.S. 134 (1980)
- White Mountain Apache Tribe v. Bracker, 448 U.S. 136 (1980)
- United States v. Sioux Nation of Indians, 448 U.S. 371 (1980)
- Montana v. United States, 450 U.S. 544 (1981)
- Merrion v. Jicarilla Apache Tribe, 455 U.S. 130 (1982)
- New Mexico v. Mescalero Apache Tribe, 462 U.S. 324 (1983)
- Rice v. Rehner, 463 U.S. 713 (1983)
- Solem v. Bartlett, 465 U.S. 463 (1984)
- Oregon Dept. of Fish and Wildlife v. Klamath Indian Tribe, 473 U.S. 753 (1985)
- California v. Cabazon Band of Mission Indians, 480 U.S. 202 (1987)
- Mississippi Band of Choctaw Indians v. Holyfield, 490 U.S. 30 (1989)
- Brendale v. Confederated Yakima Indian Nation, 492 U.S. 408 (1989)
- Oklahoma Tax Commission v. Citizen Band, Potawatomi Indian Tribe of Oklahoma, 498 U.S. 505 (1991)
- South Dakota v. Bourland, 508 U.S. 679 (1993)
- Idaho v. United States, 533 U.S. 262 (2001)
- City of Sherrill v. Oneida Indian Nation of New York, 544 U.S. 197 (2005)
- Plains Commerce Bank v. Long Family Land and Cattle Co., Inc., 556 U.S. 287 (2008)
- Dollar General Corp. v. Mississippi Band of Choctaw Indians, 579 U.S. 545 (2016)

== Statutory and treaty interpretation ==
- Ex parte Crow Dog, 109 U.S. 556 (1883)
- Lone Wolf v. Hitchcock, 187 U.S. 553 (1903)
- Menominee Tribe v. United States, 391 U.S. 404 (1968)
- Antoine v. Washington, 420 U.S. 194 (1975)
- Bryan v. Itasca County, 426 U.S. 373 (1976)
- Washington v. Confederated Bands and Tribes of the Yakima Indian Nation, 439 U.S. 463 (1979)
- Oregon Dept. of Fish and Wildlife v. Klamath Indian Tribe, 473 U.S. 753 (1985)
- South Dakota v. Bourland, 508 U.S. 679 (1993)
- Yellen v. Confederated Tribes of the Chehalis Reservation, 594 U.S. 338 (2021)

=== Fiduciary duties ===
- Seminole Nation v. United States, 316 U.S. 286 (1942)
- United States v. Mitchell, 463 U.S. 206 (1983)
- United States v. White Mountain Apache Tribe, 537 U.S. 465 (2003)
- United States v. Navajo Nation, 537 U.S. 488 (2003)
- Arizona v. Navajo Nation, 599 U.S. 555 (2023)

== Taxation ==
=== Federal ===
- Chickasaw Nation v. United States, 534 U.S. 84 (2001)

=== State ===
- Oklahoma Tax Commission v. United States, 319 U.S. 598 (1943)
- Mescalero Apache Tribe v. Jones, 411 U.S. 145 (1973)
- McClanahan v. Arizona State Tax Comm'n, 411 U.S. 164 (1973)
- Bryan v. Itasca County, 426 U.S. 373 (1976)
- Washington v. Confederated Tribes of Colville Reservation, 447 U.S. 134 (1980)
- White Mountain Apache Tribe v. Bracker, 448 U.S. 136 (1980)
- Ramah Navajo School Bd., Inc. v. Bureau of Revenue of N.M., 458 U.S. 832 (1982)
- New Mexico v. Mescalero Apache Tribe, 462 U.S. 324 (1983)
- Cotton Petroleum Corp. v. New Mexico, 490 U.S. 163 (1989)
- Oklahoma Tax Commission v. Citizen Band, Potawatomi Indian Tribe of Oklahoma, 498 U.S. 505 (1991)
- Yakima v. Confederated Tribes, 502 U.S. 251 (1992)
- Oklahoma Tax Comm'n v. Sac & Fox Nation, 508 U.S. 114 (1993)
- Dept. of Taxation and Finance of N.Y. v. Milhelm Attea & Bros., Inc., 512 U.S. 61 (1994)
- Wagnon v. Prairie Band Potawatomi Indians, 546 U.S. 95 (2005)
- Washington State Dept. of Licensing v. Cougar Den, Inc., 586 U.S. 347 (2019)

=== Tribal ===
- Merrion v. Jicarilla Apache Tribe, 455 U.S. 130 (1982)
- Alaska v. Native Village of Venetie Tribal Government, 522 U.S. 520 (1998)
- Washington State Dept. of Licensing v. Cougar Den, Inc., 586 U.S. 347 (2019)

== Tribal sovereignty ==
- Talton v. Mayes, 163 U.S. 376 (1896)
- Montoya v. United States, 180 U.S. 261 (1901)
- Oklahoma Tax Commission v. United States, 319 U.S. 598 (1943)
- Williams v. Lee, 358 U.S. 217 (1959)
- Menominee Tribe v. United States, 391 U.S. 404 (1968)
- Bryan v. Itasca County, 426 U.S. 373 (1976)
- Oliphant v. Suquamish Indian Tribe, 435 U.S. 191 (1978)
- United States v. Wheeler, 435 U.S. 313 (1978)
- Santa Clara Pueblo v. Martinez, 436 U.S. 49 (1978)
- Washington v. Confederated Bands and Tribes of the Yakima Indian Nation, 439 U.S. 463 (1979)
- Washington v. Confederated Tribes of Colville Reservation, 447 U.S. 134 (1980)
- White Mountain Apache Tribe v. Bracker, 448 U.S. 136 (1980)
- Montana v. United States, 450 U.S. 544 (1981)
- Merrion v. Jicarilla Apache Tribe, 455 U.S. 130 (1982)
- Ramah Navajo School Bd., Inc. v. Bureau of Revenue of N.M., 458 U.S. 832 (1982)
- New Mexico v. Mescalero Apache Tribe, 462 U.S. 324 (1983)
- National Farmers Union Ins. Cos. v. Crow Tribe, 468 U.S. 1315 (1984)
- Three Affiliated Tribes of Fort Berthold Reservation v. Wold Engineering, P. C., 467 U.S. 138 (1984)
- Cotton Petroleum Corp. v. New Mexico, 490 U.S. 163 (1989)
- Brendale v. Confederated Yakima Indian Nation, 492 U.S. 408 (1989)
- Duro v. Reina, 495 U.S. 676 (1990)
- Oklahoma Tax Commission v. Citizen Band, Potawatomi Indian Tribe of Oklahoma, 498 U.S. 505 (1991)
- Yakima v. Confederated Tribes, 502 U.S. 251 (1992)
- Dept. of Taxation and Finance of N.Y. v. Milhelm Attea & Bros., Inc., 512 U.S. 61 (1994)
- C & L Enterprises, Inc. v. Citizen Band, Potawatomi Indian Tribe of Oklahoma, 532 U.S. 411 (2001)
- Inyo County v. Paiute-Shoshone Indians of the Bishop Community, 538 U.S. 701 (2003)
- City of Sherrill v. Oneida Indian Nation of New York, 544 U.S. 197 (2005)
- Wagnon v. Prairie Band Potawatomi Indians, 546 U.S. 95 (2005)
- Plains Commerce Bank v. Long Family Land and Cattle Co., Inc., 556 U.S. 287 (2008)
- Michigan v. Bay Mills Indian Community, 572 U.S. 782 (2014)
- Dollar General Corp. v. Mississippi Band of Choctaw Indians, 579 U.S. 545 (2016)
- Lewis v. Clarke, 581 U.S. 155 (2017)
- Upper Skagit Tribe v. Lundgren, 584 U.S. 554 (2018)
- Lac du Flambeau Band of Lake Superior Chippewa Indians v. Coughlin, 599 U.S. 382 (2023)

== Chronological listing ==
- Fletcher v. Peck, 10 U.S. 87 (1810)
- New Jersey v. Wilson, 11 U.S. 164 (1812)
- Preston v. Browder, 14 U.S. 115 (1816)
- Danforth's Lessee v. Thomas, 14 U.S. 155 (1816)
- Johnson v. McIntosh, 21 U.S. 543 (1823)
- Patterson v. Jenks, 27 U.S. 216 (1829)
- American Fur Co. v. United States, 27 U.S. 358 (1829)
- Cherokee Nation v. Georgia, 30 U.S. 1 (1831)
- Worcester v. Georgia, 31 U.S. 515 (1832)
- United States v. Rogers, 45 U.S. (4 How.) 567 (1846)
- United States v. Brooks, 51 U.S. 442 (1851)
- United States v. Holliday, 70 U.S. 407 (1865)
- In re Kansas Indians, 72 U.S. 737 (1866)
- The Cherokee Tobacco, 78 U.S. 616 (1870)
- Walker v. Henshaw, 83 U.S. 436 (1872)
- Holden v. Joy, 84 U.S. 211 (1872)
- United States v. Cook, 86 U.S. 591 (1874)
- United States v. Joseph, 94 U.S. 614 (1877)
- Beecher v. Wetherby, 95 U.S. 517 (1877)
- Harkness v. Hyde, 98 U.S. 476 (1879)
- United States v. Perryman, 100 U.S. 235 (1880)
- Pennock v. Commissioners, 103 U.S. 44 (1881)
- United States v. McBratney, 104 U.S. 621 (1881)
- United States v. Forty-Three Gallons of Whiskey, 108 U.S. 491 (1883)
- Ex parte Crow Dog, 109 U.S. 556 (1883)
- Elk v. Wilkins, 112 U.S. 94 (1884)
- United States v. Kagama, 118 U.S. 375 (1886)
- Sarlls v. United States, 152 U.S. 570 (1894)
- Talton v. Mayes, 163 U.S. 376 (1896)
- Ward v. Race Horse, 163 U.S. 504 (1896)
- Lucas v. United States, 163 U.S. 612 (1896)
- Bad Elk v. United States, 177 U.S. 529 (1900)
- Montoya v. United States, 180 U.S. 261 (1901)
- Lone Wolf v. Hitchcock, 187 U.S. 553 (1903)
- Ex parte Joins, 191 U.S. 93 (1903)
- United States v. Winans, 198 U.S. 371 (1905)
- Winters v. United States, 207 U.S. 564 (1908)
- United States v. Sandoval, 231 U.S. 28 (1913)
- United States v. Nice, 241 U.S. 591 (1916)
- Alaska Pacific Fisheries v. United States, 248 U.S. 78 (1918)
- Blanset v. Cardin, 256 U.S. 319 (1921)
- Sperry Oil & Gas Co. v. Chisholm, 264 U.S. 488 (1924)
- Sunderland v. United States, 266 U.S. 226 (1924)
- United States v. Minnesota, 270 U.S. 181 (1926)
- United States v. Ramsey, 271 U.S. 467 (1926)
- Carpenter v. Shaw, 280 U.S. 363 (1930)
- United States v. Creek Nation, 295 U.S. 103 (1935)
- United States v. Shoshone Tribe of Indians, 304 U.S. 111 (1938)
- Tulee v. Washington, 315 U.S. 681 (1942)
- Seminole Nation v. United States, 316 U.S. 286 (1942)
- Oklahoma Tax Commission v. United States, 319 U.S. 598 (1943)
- Arenas v. United States, 322 U.S. 419 (1944)
- Williams v. Lee, 358 U.S. 217 (1959)
- Seymour v. Superintendent of Washington State Penitentiary, 368 U.S. 351 (1962)
- Organized Village of Kake v. Egan, 369 U.S. 60 (1962)
- Warren Trading Post Co. v. Arizona Tax Comm'n, 380 U.S. 685 (1965)
- Puyallup Tribe v. Department of Game, 391 U.S. 392 (1968)
- Menominee Tribe v. United States, 391 U.S. 404 (1968)
- United States v. Southern Ute Tribe or Band of Indians, 402 U.S. 159 (1971)
- Affiliated Ute Citizens of Utah v. United States, 406 U.S. 128 (1972)
- Mescalero Apache Tribe v. Jones, 411 U.S. 145 (1973)
- McClanahan v. Arizona State Tax Comm'n, 411 U.S. 164 (1973)
- Keeble v. United States, 412 U.S. 205 (1973)
- Mattz v. Arnett, 412 U.S. 481 (1973)
- Department of Game v. Puyallup Tribe, 414 U.S. 44 (1973)
- Morton v. Ruiz, 415 U.S. 199 (1974)
- Morton v. Mancari, 417 U.S. 535 (1974)
- United States v. Mazurie, 419 U.S. 544 (1975)
- Antoine v. Washington, 420 U.S. 194 (1975)
- Fisher v. District Court, 424 U.S. 382 (1976)
- Moe v. Confederated Salish and Kootenai Tribes of Flathead Reservation, 425 U.S. 463 (1976)
- Bryan v. Itasca County, 426 U.S. 373 (1976)
- Puyallup Tribe v. Department of Game, 429 U.S. 976 (1976)
- Delaware Tribal Business Committee v. Weeks, 430 U.S. 73 (1977)
- United States v. Antelope, 430 U.S. 641 (1977)
- Puyallup Tribe, Inc. v. Department of Game of Wash., 433 U.S. 165 (1977)
- Oliphant v. Suquamish Indian Tribe, 435 U.S. 191 (1978)
- United States v. Wheeler, 435 U.S. 313 (1978)
- Santa Clara Pueblo v. Martinez, 436 U.S. 49 (1978)
- United States v. John, 437 U.S. 634 (1978)
- Washington v. Confederated Bands and Tribes of the Yakima Indian Nation, 439 U.S. 463 (1979)
- Wilson v. Omaha Tribe, 442 U.S. 653 (1979)
- Washington v. Washington State Commercial Passenger Fishing Vessel Association, 443 U.S. 658 (1979)
- United States v. Mitchell, 445 U.S. 535 (1980)
- Washington v. Confederated Tribes of Colville Reservation, 447 U.S. 134 (1980)
- White Mountain Apache Tribe v. Bracker, 448 U.S. 136 (1980)
- Central Machinery Co. v. Arizona Tax Comm'n, 448 U.S. 160 (1980)
- United States v. Sioux Nation of Indians, 448 U.S. 371 (1980)
- Montana v. United States, 450 U.S. 544 (1981)
- Merrion v. Jicarilla Apache Tribe, 455 U.S. 130 (1982)
- Ramah Navajo School Bd., Inc. v. Bureau of Revenue of N.M., 458 U.S. 832 (1982)
- New Mexico v. Mescalero Apache Tribe, 462 U.S. 324 (1983)
- United States v. Mitchell, 463 U.S. 206 (1983)
- Rice v. Rehner, 463 U.S. 713 (1983)
- Solem v. Bartlett, 465 U.S. 463 (1984)
- Three Affiliated Tribes of Fort Berthold Reservation v. Wold Engineering, P. C., 467 U.S. 138 (1984)
- National Farmers Union Ins. Cos. v. Crow Tribe, 468 U.S. 1315 (1984)
- United States v. Dann, 470 U.S. 39 (1985)
- Kerr-McGee Corp. v. Navajo Tribe, 471 U.S. 195 (1985)
- Montana v. Blackfeet Tribe, 471 U.S. 759 (1985)
- Oregon Dept. of Fish and Wildlife v. Klamath Indian Tribe, 473 U.S. 753 (1985)
- South Carolina v. Catawba Tribe, Inc., 476 U.S. 498 (1986)
- Bowen v. Roy, 476 U.S. 693 (1986)
- Iowa Mutual Insurance Co. v. LaPlante, 480 U.S. 9 (1987)
- California v. Cabazon Band of Mission Indians, 480 U.S. 202 (1987)
- Hodel v. Irving, 481 U.S. 704 (1987)
- Lyng v. Northwest Indian Cemetery Protective Association, 485 U.S. 439 (1988)
- Mississippi Band of Choctaw Indians v. Holyfield, 490 U.S. 30 (1989)
- Cotton Petroleum Corp. v. New Mexico, 490 U.S. 163 (1989)
- Brendale v. Confederated Yakima Indian Nation, 492 U.S. 408 (1989)
- Employment Division, Oregon Department of Natural Resources v. Smith, 494 U.S. 872 (1990)
- Duro v. Reina, 495 U.S. 676 (1990)
- Oklahoma Tax Commission v. Citizen Band, Potawatomi Indian Tribe of Oklahoma, 498 U.S. 505 (1991)
- Blatchford v. Native Village of Noatak, 501 U.S. 775 (1991)
- Yakima v. Confederated Tribes, 502 U.S. 251 (1992)
- Negonsott v. Samuels, 507 U.S. 99 (1993)
- Oklahoma Tax Comm'n v. Sac & Fox Nation, 508 U.S. 114 (1993)
- Lincoln v. Vigil, 508 U.S. 182 (1993)
- South Dakota v. Bourland, 508 U.S. 679 (1993)
- Hagen v. Utah, 510 U.S. 399 (1994)
- Dept. of Taxation and Finance of N.Y. v. Milhelm Attea & Bros., Inc., 512 U.S. 61 (1994)
- Oklahoma Tax Comm'n v. Chickasaw Nation, 515 U.S. 450 (1995)
- Seminole Tribe of Florida v. Florida, 517 U.S. 44 (1996)
- Babbitt v. Youpee, 519 U.S. 234 (1997)
- Strate v. A-1 Contractors, 520 U.S. 438 (1997)
- Idaho v. Coeur d'Alene Tribe of Idaho, 521 U.S. 261 (1997)
- South Dakota v. Yankton Sioux Tribe, 522 U.S. 329 (1998)
- Alaska v. Native Village of Venetie Tribal Government, 522 U.S. 520 (1998)
- Montana v. Crow Tribe of Indians, 523 U.S. 696 (1998)
- Kiowa Tribe of Oklahoma v. Manufacturing Technologies, Inc., 523 U.S. 751 (1998)
- Cass County v. Leech Lake Band of Chippewa Indians, 524 U.S. 103 (1998)
- Arizona Dept. of Revenue v. Blaze, 526 U.S. 32 (1999)
- Minnesota v. Mille Lacs Band of Chippewa Indians, 526 U.S. 172 (1999)
- El Paso Natural Gas Company v. Neztsosie, 526 U.S. 473 (1999)
- Amoco Production Co. v. Southern Ute Indian Tribe, 526 U.S. 865 (1999)
- Rice v. Cayetano, 528 U.S. 495 (2000)
- Arizona v. California, 530 U.S. 392 (2000)
- Department of the Interior v. Klamath Water Users Association, 532 U.S. 1 (2001)
- C & L Enterprises, Inc. v. Citizen Band, Potawatomi Indian Tribe of Oklahoma, 532 U.S. 411 (2001)
- Atkinson Trading Co. v. Shirley, 532 U.S. 645 (2001)
- Idaho v. United States, 533 U.S. 262 (2001)
- Nevada v. Hicks, 533 U.S. 353 (2001)
- Chickasaw Nation v. United States, 534 U.S. 84 (2001)
- United States v. White Mountain Apache Tribe, 537 U.S. 465 (2003)
- United States v. Navajo Nation, 537 U.S. 488 (2003)
- Inyo County v. Paiute-Shoshone Indians of the Bishop Community, 538 U.S. 701 (2003)
- South Florida Water Management Dist. v. Miccosukee Tribe, 541 U.S. 95 (2004)
- United States v. Lara, 541 U.S. 193 (2004)
- Cherokee Nation of Oklahoma v. Leavitt, 543 U.S. 631 (2005)
- City of Sherrill v. Oneida Indian Nation of New York, 544 U.S. 197 (2005)
- Wagnon v. Prairie Band Potawatomi Indians, 546 U.S. 95 (2005)
- Plains Commerce Bank v. Long Family Land and Cattle Co., Inc., 556 U.S. 287 (2008)
- Carcieri v. Salazar, 555 U.S. 379 (2009)
- United States v. Navajo Nation, 556 U.S. 287 (2009)
- Madison County v. Oneida Indian Nation of New York, 562 U.S. 42 (2011)
- United States v. Tohono O'odham Nation, 563 U.S. 307 (2011)
- United States v. Jicarilla Apache Nation, 564 U.S. 162 (2011)
- Salazar v. Ramah Navajo Chapter, 567 U.S. 182 (2012)
- Match-E-Be-Nash-She-Wish Band of Pottawatomi Indians v. Patchak, 567 U.S. 209 (2012)
- Adoptive Couple v. Baby Girl, 570 U.S. 637 (2013)
- Michigan v. Bay Mills Indian Community, 572 U.S. 782 (2014)
- Menominee Tribe of Wis. v. United States, No. 14-510, 577 U.S. ___ (2016)
- Nebraska v. Parker, No. 14-1406, 577 U.S. ___ (2016)
- United States v. Bryant, No. 15-420, 579 U.S. ___ (2016)
- Dollar General Corp. v. Mississippi Band of Choctaw Indians, No. 13-1496, 579 U.S. ___ (2016)
- Lewis v. Clarke, No. 15-1500, 581 U.S. ___ (2017)
- Patchak v. Zinke, No. 16-498, 583 U.S. ___ (2018)
- Upper Skagit Tribe v. Lundgren, No. 17-387, 584 U.S. ___ (2018)
- Washington v. United States, No. 17-269, 584 U.S. ___ (2018)
- Washington State Dept. of Licensing v. Cougar Den, Inc., No. 16-1498, 586 U.S. ___ (2019)
- Herrera v. Wyoming, No. 17-532, 587 U.S. ___ (2019)
- McGirt v. Oklahoma, No. 18-9526, 591 U.S. ___ (2020)
- Sharp v. Murphy, No. 17-1107, 591 U.S. ___ (2020)
- United States v. Cooley, No. 19-1414, 593 U.S. ___ (2021)
- Yellen v. Confederated Tribes of the Chehalis Reservation, No. 20-543, 594 U.S. ___ (2021)
- Denezpi v. United States, No. 20-7622, 596 U.S. ___ (2022)
- Ysleta del Sur Pueblo v. Texas, No. 20-493, 596 U.S. ___ (2022)
- Oklahoma v. Castro-Huerta, No. 21-429, 597 U.S. ___ (2022)
- Haaland v. Brackeen, No. 21-376, 599 U.S. ___ (2023)
- Lac du Flambeau Band of Lake Superior Chippewa Indians v. Coughlin, No. 22-227, 599 U.S. ___ (2023)
- Arizona v. Navajo Nation, No. 21-1484, 599 U.S. ___ (2023)
- Becerra v. San Carlos Apache Tribe, No. 23-250, 602 U.S. ___ (2024)

== See also ==
- Outline of United States federal Indian law and policy
