= McBratney =

McBratney is a surname. Notable people with the surname include:

- James McBratney (1941–1973), American mobster
- Sam McBratney (1943–2020), Northern Irish writer

== See also ==
- United States v. McBratney, a United States Supreme Court case
