= Oregon Department of Fish & Wildlife v. Klamath Indian Tribe =

Oregon Department of Fish and Wildlife v. Klamath Indian Tribe
- Supreme Court of the United States

Argued February 27, 1985 Decided July 2, 1985
- Full case name: Oregon Department of Fish and Wildlife v. Klamath Indian Tribe
- Citations: 473 U.S. 753 (more) 105 S. Ct. 3420; 87 L. Ed. 2d 542; 1985 U.S. LEXIS 132; 53 U.S.L.W. 5106

Case history
- Prior: Klamath Indian Tribe v. Oregon Dept. of Fish & Wildlife, 729 F.2d 609 (9th Cir. 1984); cert. granted, 469 U.S. 879 (1984).

Holding
- The exclusive right to hunt, fish, gather roots, berries, and seeds on the lands reserved to the Klamath Tribe by the 1864 Treaty was not intended to survive as a special right to be free of state regulation in the ceded lands that were outside the reservation after the 1901 Agreement.

Court membership
- Chief Justice Warren E. Burger Associate Justices William J. Brennan Jr. · Byron White; Thurgood Marshall · Harry Blackmun; Lewis F. Powell Jr. · William Rehnquist; John P. Stevens · Sandra Day O'Connor

Case opinions
- Majority: Stevens, joined by Burger, White, Blackmun, Rehnquist, O'Connor
- Dissent: Marshall, joined by Brennan
- Powell took no part in the consideration or decision of the case.

Oregon Department of Fish and Wildlife v. Klamath Indian Tribe, 473 U.S. 753 (1985), was a case appealed to the US Supreme Court by the Oregon Department of Fish and Wildlife. The Supreme Court reversed the previous decisions in the District Court and the Court of Appeals stating that the exclusive right to hunt, fish, and gather roots, berries, and seeds on the lands reserved to the Klamath Tribe by the 1864 Treaty was not intended to survive as a special right to be free of state regulation in the ceded lands that were outside the reservation after the 1901 Agreement.

== Background ==
In a treaty in 1864 the Klamath and Modoc Tribes, along with the Yahooskin Band of Snake Indians, now collectively called the Klamath Indian Tribe, ceded their aboriginal title to approximately 22,000,000 acres (89,000 km^{2}) of aboriginal lands to the United States. In return they retained 1,900,000 acres (7,700 km^{2}) for a reservation. It was expressly stated in the 1864 Treaty the Tribe would be secured "the exclusive right of taking fish in the streams and lakes, included in said reservation".

Government surveyors surveyed the reservation boundaries two different times, once in 1871 and again in 1888. Both surveys failed to include large tracts of land which included the meadows of the Sycan and Sprague River valleys which were originally intended for the reservation.

After many years of tribal complaints, The United States Congress authorized a commission from the General Land Office to determine the amount and value of the excluded land. In 1896 the commission concluded that approximately 621,824 acres (2,516.4 km^{2}) were excluded, and that land were worth $537,000, or roughly 83.36 cents per acre. This figure was based on soil quality, grazing lands, and timber. The Klamath Tribes' hunting, fishing, and trapping rights were not mentioned in the commission's report.

In 1901, the Bureau of Indian Affairs negotiated an agreement with the Klamath Tribe for cession of the excluded lands. In the Agreement, the United States agreed to pay the Tribe $537,007.20 for the 621,824 acres (2,516.4 km^{2}) of reservation land. In Article I, the tribe agreed to "cede, surrender, grant, and convey to the United States all their claim, right, title and interest in and to" that land. The United States Congress ratified the agreement in 1906. Virtually all ceded lands were immediately closed to entry and placed in national forests or parks.

== Case ==
In 1982 the Klamath Tribe filed suit against the Oregon Department of Fish and Wildlife, along with various state officials, in Federal District Court seeking an injunction against the department's interference with tribal members' hunting and fishing activities on the previously ceded lands in the 1901 Agreement. The District Court entered judgement in favor of the Tribe and declared that the 1901 Agreement "did not abrogate" the Tribe's 1864 "Treaty rights....to hunt, fish, trap, and gather, free from regulation by the...State of Oregon" on the lands ceded to the United States.

The Court of Appeals affirmed the District Court's decision. The Court held that the 1864 Treaty had reserved the Tribe's rights to hunt and fish and the cession of lands in the 1901 Agreement did not specifically include the hunting and fishing rights. The Court of Appeals asserted that the tribe had retained all the rights that were not specified in the cession.

The issue in this case is that the Klamath Tribal members were asserting that they had the right to hunt and fish outside the boundaries of the reservation established in the 1901 Agreement including the lands ceded in the agreement. The tribes agreed that they had no rights to hunt and fish on the ceded lands that were currently privately owned. The question the court was considering was whether or not the Tribe reserved a special right to hunt and fish on the ceded lands and were free of state regulation through the 1901 Agreement. The Court pointed out that the language in the 1864 Treaty indicated that the Tribe's right to hunt and fish was restricted to the reservation and not on any of their additional ceded lands. In addition, the language in the 1901 Agreement did not evidence any intent to preserve special off-reservation hunting or fishing rights for the Tribe.

== See also ==
Related cases

- United States v. Winans, 198 U.S. 371 (1905).
- Carpenter v. Shaw, 280 U.S. 363 (1930).
- Puyallup Tribe v. Department of Game of Washington, 391 U.S. 392 (1968).
- Washington v. Washington Commercial Passenger Fishing Vessel Assn., 443 U.S. 658 (1979).
- Kimball v. Callahan, 590 F.2d 768 (1979).
- Red Lake Band of Chippewa Indians v. Minnesota, 449 U.S. 905 (1980).

Other

- List of U.S. Supreme Court Cases involving Indian tribes
