= Oklahoma Tax Commission v. Sac & Fox Nation =

Oklahoma Tax Comm'n v. Sac & Fox Nation
- Supreme Court of the United States

Argued March 23, 1993 Decided May 17, 1993
- Full case name: Oklahoma Tax Commission v. Sac & Fox Nation
- Citations: 508 U.S. 114 (more) 113 S. Ct. 1985; 124 L. Ed. 2d 30; 1993 U.S. LEXIS 3135

Case history
- Prior: 967 F.2d 1425 (10th Cir. 1992)

Holding
- Absent explicit congressional direction to the contrary, it must be presumed that a State does not have jurisdiction to tax tribal members who live and work in Indian country, whether the particular territory consists of a formal or informal reservation, allotted lands, or dependent Indian communities.

Court membership
- Chief Justice William Rehnquist Associate Justices Byron White · Harry Blackmun; John P. Stevens · Sandra Day O'Connor; Antonin Scalia · Anthony Kennedy; David Souter · Clarence Thomas

Case opinion
- Majority: O'Connor, joined by unanimous

Oklahoma Tax Commission v. Sac & Fox Nation, 508 U.S. 114 (1993), was a case in which the Supreme Court of the United States held that absent explicit congressional direction to the contrary, it must be presumed that a State does not have jurisdiction to tax tribal members who live and work in Indian country, whether the particular territory consists of a formal or informal reservation, allotted lands, or dependent Indian communities.

The Sac and Fox Nation is an Indian (Native American) tribe that governs itself under the Indian Self-Determination Act and imposes taxes based on that authority. The State of Oklahoma sought to impose income and motor vehicle taxes on tribal members. The tribe brought suit to prevent the state from imposing those taxes.

Both the Tenth Circuit Court of Appeals and the Supreme Court held that Oklahoma, without a clear authorization from Congress, was prohibited from imposing taxes on tribal members in Indian country. This case, together with several other cases, are known as the "Oklahoma tax cases" in Native American case law.

== Background ==
=== History ===
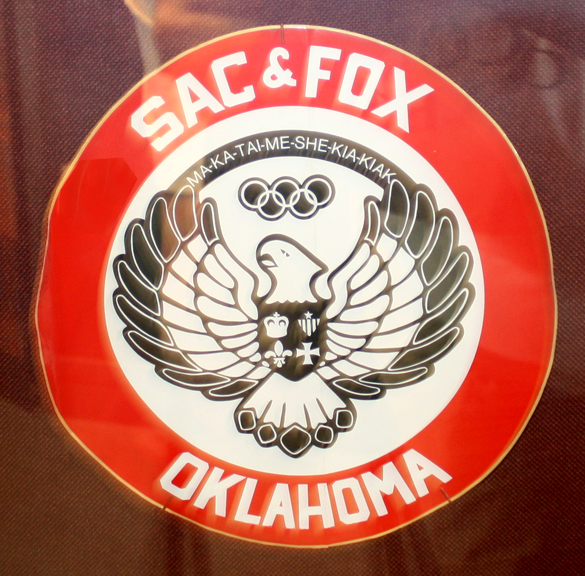
Seal of Sac & Fox Nation

The Sac and Fox Nation is an Indian tribe originally from the Great Lakes area. Following a series of treaties with the United States, in 1867 they moved to the Sac and Fox reservation of 480,000 acres (190,000 ha) in Indian Territory (in what is now Pottawatomie County in the State of Oklahoma). In 1887, Congress passed the Dawes Act which broke up the reservation and allotted land to the tribal members. In implementing this law, the United States entered into another treaty with the tribe in 1891, in which the tribe retained 800 acres (320 ha) as a tribal headquarters and tribal members were allotted 160 acres (65 ha) of land from the former reservation.

The Sac and Fox Nation governs itself under the authority of the Indian Self-Determination Act and has its own tax commission. The tribe imposes a tax on earnings of any person working within tribal jurisdiction, regardless of whether that person is a tribal member. The tribe also provides for a motor vehicle tax and registration of any vehicle that are owned by a tribal member and garaged within tribal jurisdiction. The State of Oklahoma, through the Oklahoma Tax Commission, also administers income and motor vehicle taxes. The state considers that all income earned in the state is taxable, including on tribal land, and issues tax assessments against those who are delinquent. Oklahoma contends that anyone within the state had to register their vehicles with the state, while the Sac and Fox Nation required tribal members residing in tribal jurisdiction to register the vehicle with the tribe. The state viewed those members to be delinquent in their vehicle taxes, but made no effort to collect until the vehicle was sold to a new owner. At that time, Oklahoma would require that the delinquent taxes and penalties be paid in order to register the vehicle.

=== Lower courts ===
Seal of Oklahoma

The Sac and Fox Nation then filed a lawsuit against the Oklahoma Tax Commission in U.S. District Court seeking a permanent injunction prohibiting the state from taxing income earned within tribal jurisdiction or of those who reside within the tribe's jurisdiction, and from vehicle taxes on vehicles that were lawfully registered with the tribe. Both the Sac and Fox Nation and Oklahoma made motions for summary judgment and the district court, without determining reservation boundaries, held that while the state could collect income tax on non-tribal members, they could not collect income taxes from tribal members employed by the tribe on trust land. The district court also held that the state could not collect vehicle taxes for periods that the vehicle was properly registered with the tribe. Both sides appealed to the Tenth Circuit Court of Appeals.

The Tenth Circuit Court affirmed the decision of the district court. First the court noted that the reservation boundaries were not relevant to the case, the issue instead being tribal immunity from state jurisdiction. The court noted the prior Supreme Court decision in Okla. Tax Comm'n v. Citizen Band, Potawatomi Indian Tribe of Okla. and stated that "It appears as though the State of Oklahoma persists in fighting a battle it has already lost." Since Oklahoma could provide no Congressional authority for collecting taxes from Sac and Fox tribal members it was clear that the state had exceeded its authority. On the income tax for non-tribal employees, the Sac and Fox Nation asserted that the Commerce Clause and treaty language granted it exclusive taxing authority on tribal land. The appellate court was not persuaded and ruled that the state could impose an income tax on non-tribal members.

On the issue of tribal motor vehicle taxes and registration, the Tenth Circuit Court did not make a distinction between tribal and non-tribal members. The court held that the tribe could require the registration of vehicles on tribal land, regardless of whether the owner was a tribal member or not. The court noted that both Moe v. Salish and Kootenai Tribes and Washington v. Confederated Tribes of the Colville Indian Reservation prohibit such state taxation on tribal members. The state could enforce its vehicle tax on non-tribal members.

Both parties appealed to the Supreme Court, which, after noting a Wisconsin Supreme Court decision in the same area, granted certiorari and agreed to hear the case.

== Opinion of the court ==
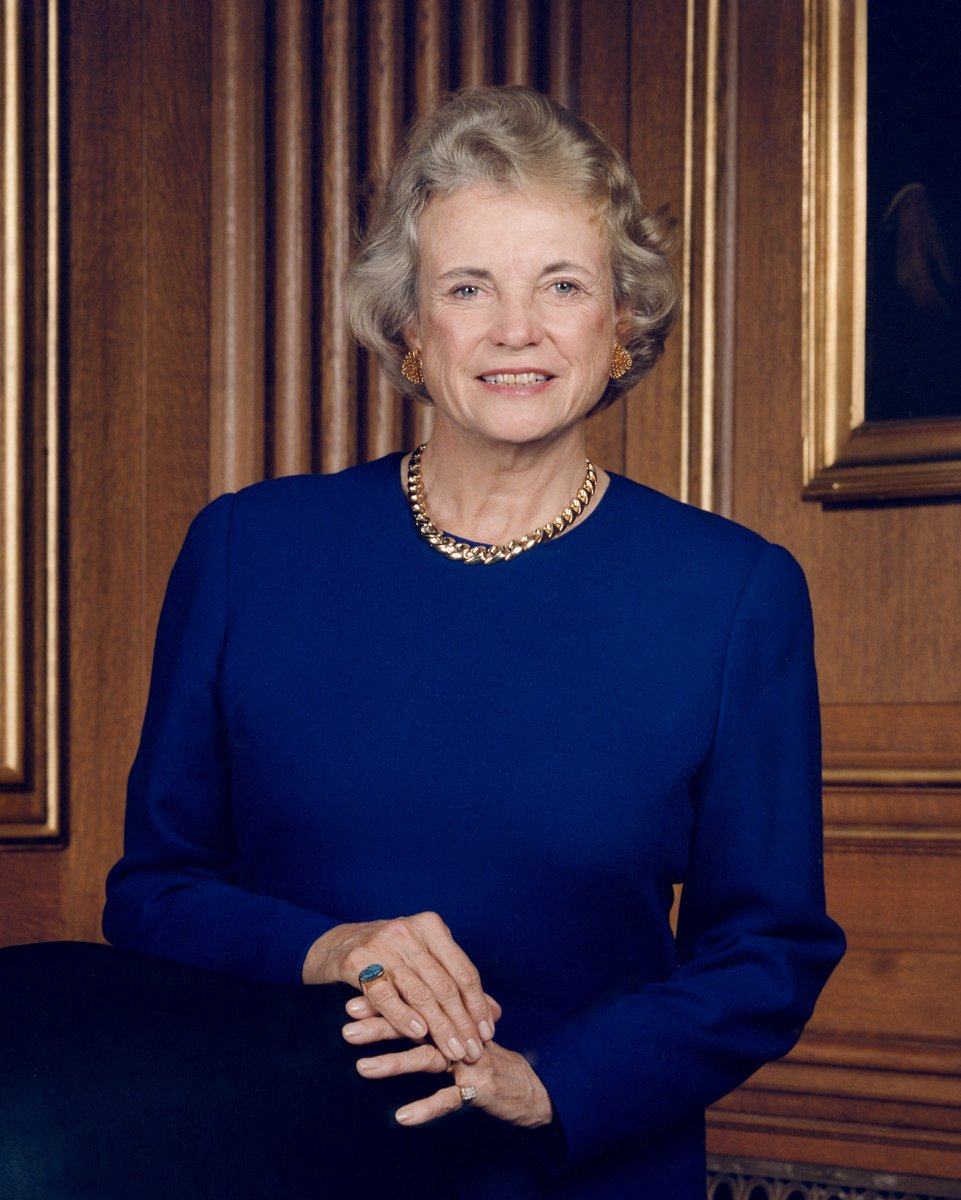
Justice Sandra Day O'Connor, author of the unanimous opinion

=== Arguments ===
David Allen Miley argued the case for Oklahoma. Edwin Kneedler argued the case for the United States as amicus curiae on behalf of the tribe, with Solicitor General Ken Starr. G. William Rice argued the case for the Sac and Fox Nation. Amicus curiae briefs in support of Oklahoma were filed by Arizona, Minnesota, North Dakota and Wisconsin. Briefs in support of the tribe were filed by Assiniboine and Sioux Tribes of the Fort Peck Indian Reservation, Cheyenne-Arapaho Tribes of Oklahoma, Choctaw Nation of Oklahoma and Navajo Nation.

The state argued that the case law cited by the Tenth Circuit only dealt with established Indian reservations and that the appellate court erred since the Sac and Fox reservation had been disestablished in the 1890s. The Tax Commission's position was that there were no more reservations in Oklahoma. Oklahoma stated that without determining reservation boundaries, if any, the lower court would be unable to properly apply tribal immunity. The state also argued that the vehicle tax and registration fees were more akin to a sales tax and a use fee than an excise tax.

=== Opinion ===
Justice Sandra Day O'Connor delivered the opinion of a unanimous court. O'Connor stated that Oklahoma's argument that a tribal member must live on a reservation to be exempt from state taxes was incorrect. All that is required is that the member live in "Indian country", which Congress has defined to "include formal and informal reservations, dependent Indian communities, and Indian allotments, whether restricted or held in trust by the United States." O'Connor noted that the Tenth Circuit should have determined the residence of the tribal members as inside or outside of Indian country, not if they were within the reservation. She noted that in Potawatomi case, Oklahoma made exactly the same argument which was also rejected by the court.

O'Connor also rejected the state's argument that the motor vehicle tax was not an excise tax and that the registration fee was a use fee. She stated that the tax strongly resembled the taxes prohibited by Colville and Moe, and noted that if the registration fee was a use fee, then non-residents of Oklahoma would not be exempt. The court upheld the decision of the Tenth Circuit Court.

== Subsequent developments ==
This case, together with two other involving the Oklahoma Tax Commission have defined tribal sovereignty in a clearer manner. The case has been cited in numerous lower court opinions, as well as the Supreme Courts own opinions, as limiting the ability of state governments to act in Indian country. Sac and Fox, together with Potawatomi and Oklahoma Tax Commission v. Chickasaw Nation, have become known as the "Oklahoma tax cases". The decision is also unique in that it uses a federal criminal jurisdiction statute as the basis for civil jurisdiction.
