= Washington State Department of Licensing v. Cougar Den, Inc. =

- Supreme Court of the United States

Argued October 30, 2018 Decided March 19, 2019
- Full case name: Washington State Department of Licensing v. Cougar Den, Incorporated
- Docket no.: 16-1498
- Citations: 586 U.S. 347 (more) 139 S. Ct. 1000; 203 L. Ed. 2d 301

Case history
- Prior: Cougar Den, Inc. v. Dep't of Licensing, 392 P.3d 1014 (2017); cert. granted, 138 S. Ct. 2671 (2018).

Holding
- The Yakama Nation Treaty of 1855 preempts the state law which the State purported to be able to tax fuel purchased by a tribal corporation for sale to tribal members.

Court membership
- Chief Justice John Roberts Associate Justices Clarence Thomas · Ruth Bader Ginsburg; Stephen Breyer · Samuel Alito; Sonia Sotomayor · Elena Kagan; Neil Gorsuch · Brett Kavanaugh

Case opinions
- Plurality: Breyer, joined by Sotomayor, Kagan
- Concurrence: Gorsuch (in judgment), joined by Ginsburg
- Dissent: Roberts, joined by Thomas, Alito, Kavanaugh
- Dissent: Kavanaugh, joined by Thomas

Laws applied
- Yakama Nation Treaty of 1855; Wash. Rev. Code §§82.36.010(4), (12), (16)

Washington State Department of Licensing v. Cougar Den, Inc., 586 U.S. 347 (2019), was a United States Supreme Court case in which the Court held that the Yakama Nation Treaty of 1855 preempts the state law which the State purported to be able to tax fuel purchased by a tribal corporation for sale to tribal members. This was a 5-4 plurality decision, with Justice Breyer's opinion being joined by Justices Sotomayor and Kagan. Justice Gorsuch, joined by Justice Ginsburg, penned a concurring opinion. There were dissenting opinions by Chief Justice Roberts and Justice Kavanaugh.

== Background ==
=== Facts of the case ===
The Yakama Nation is an American Indian tribe in Washington, located on the Yakama Indian Reservation, on the east side of the Cascade Mountains. In 1855, the tribe signed the Yakama Nation Treaty of 1855, ceding approximately 10,000,000 acres to the United States, but reserving important rights for the tribe and its members. In the treaty, the tribe reserved “the right, in common with citizens of the United States, to travel upon all public highways.”

Cougar Den, Inc., was a corporation owned by the Yakama Nation, and which imported gasoline onto the reservation for sale to tribal members. The laws of the State of Washington imposed a tax on fuel imported into the state by truck, which the tribe refused to pay. Washington, in 2013, assessed taxes and penalties of $3.6 million dollars against the tribe. Cougar Den appealed the assessment.

=== Procedural history ===
The matter was first heard by an administrative law judge, who ruled in favor of the tribe, and that the tax was preempted by the treaty. The State asked for review, and the Director of the State Department of Licensing reversed, holding that the tribe owed the Department the assessment. Cougar Den then petitioned in the Yakima County Superior Court, which was sitting in an appellate capacity. The Superior Court reversed the Director's decision, holding that the tax was preempted by treaty. The Department appealed and the Washington Supreme Court granted direct review. In a 7–2 decision, the Washington Supreme Court affirmed the lower decision, holding that the treaty preempted the state tax. The Department then petitioned the United States Supreme Court, and the Court granted certiorari.

== Supreme Court ==
=== Arguments ===
State Solicitor General Noah Purcell argued the case for the State of Washington. Purcell argued that the taxes merely reached possession of the fuel, not the right to travel. Assistant U.S. Solicitor General Anne O’Connell argued for the United States, supporting the State of Washington. She took the same position as Purcell, that the treaty only guaranteed the tribe the right to use the roads. Adam Unikowsky argued the case for the Yakama Nation. Unikowsky argued that the treaty allowed the tribe the right to take its goods to and from the marketplace. He stated that this was a tax on travel with goods, not the possession of the goods.

=== Opinion of the Court ===
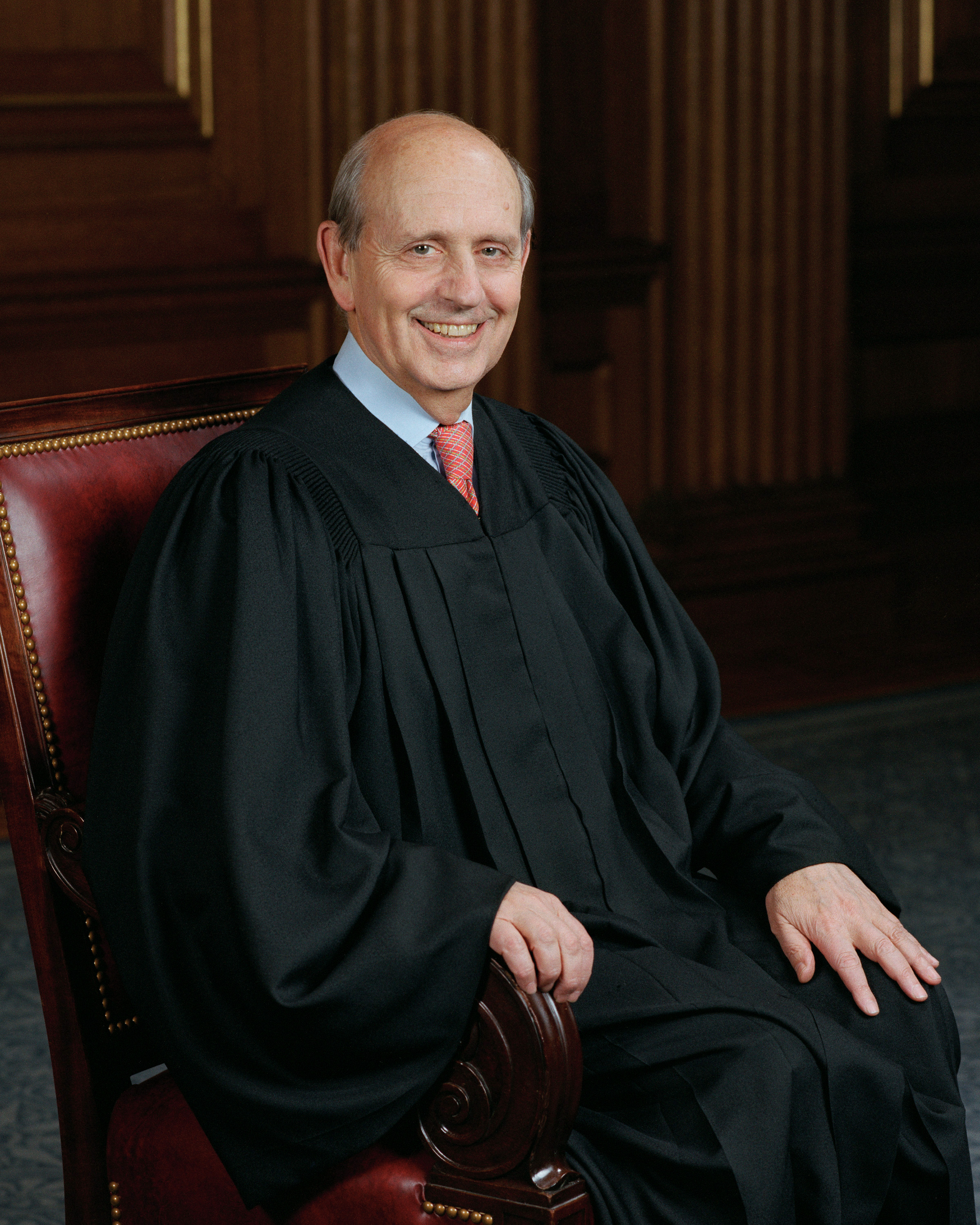
Justice Stephen Breyer, author of the opinion

The opinion of the Court was delivered by Associate Justice Stephen Breyer, joined by Justices Sonia Sotomayor and Elena Kagan. Justice Breyer noted that the Washington tax was not a tax on possession or the importation of fuel, only on the ground transportation of fuel. Therefore, the "State must prove that Cougar Den traveled by highway in order to apply its tax." He observed that Washington had amended its fuel taxation scheme, after a U.S. District Court had barred the State from taxing fuel on the tribal reservation. In addition, Breyer noted that the tribe, at the time they agreed to the treaty, would have understood that they had the "right to travel on the public highways included the right to travel with goods for purposes of trade." Since the tax placed a burden on the right of the tribe to travel on the highway with goods, the state law was preempted by the treaty, and the lower decision was affirmed.

=== Concurring opinion ===
Justice Neil Gorsuch, joined by Justice Ruth Bader Ginsburg, issued a concurring opinion. In his view, the Court was "charged with adopting the interpretation most consistent with the treaty’s original meaning." Justice Gorsuch noted that the treaty was written in English, then translated into Chinook (a pidgin language, not the native tongue of the tribe), and the interpretation must be based on how the Yakama Nation understood it at the time of the treaty signing. He felt that the tribe believed that the treaty provided them “with the right to travel on all public highways without being subject to any licensing and permitting fees related to the exercise of that right while engaged in the transportation of tribal goods.” Justice Gorsuch concluded his opinion with:

"Really, this case just tells an old and familiar story. The State of Washington includes millions of acres that the Yakamas ceded to the United States under significant pressure. In return, the government supplied a handful of modest promises. The State is now dissatisfied with the consequences of one of those promises. It is a new day, and now it wants more. But today and to its credit, the Court holds the parties to the terms of their deal. It is the least we can do."

=== Dissenting opinions ===
Chief Justice John Roberts, joined by Justices Clarence Thomas, Samuel Alito, and Brett Kavanaugh dissented. Roberts believed that the State's tax was a tax on the possession of the fuel, not on its transportation. In his opinion, the tax would be preempted only if it acted as a toll or a blockade.

Further to Roberts' dissent, Justice Kavanaugh, joined by Justice Thomas, issued a separate dissent. Justice Kavanaugh stated that the treaty merely allowed tribal members to travel on public highways on the same basis as non-Indian citizens.

== See also ==
- Oklahoma Tax Commission v. Citizen Band, Potawatomi Indian Tribe of Oklahoma
