= Mescalero Apache Tribe v. Jones =

- Supreme Court of the United States

Argued December 12, 1972 Decided March 27, 1973
- Full case name: Mescalero Apache Tribe v. Jones, Commissioner, Bureau of Revenue of New Mexico, et al.
- Citations: 411 U.S. 145 (more) 93 S. Ct. 1267; 36 L. Ed. 2d 114; 1973 U.S. LEXIS 88

Case history
- Prior: Mescalero Apache Tribe v. Jones, 489 P.2d 666 (N. Mex. App. 1971).

Holding
- A state could tax tribal, off-reservation business activities but could not impose a tax on tribal land, which was exempt from all forms of property taxes.

Court membership
- Chief Justice Warren E. Burger Associate Justices William O. Douglas · William J. Brennan Jr. Potter Stewart · Byron White; Thurgood Marshall · Harry Blackmun; Lewis F. Powell Jr. · William Rehnquist

Case opinions
- Majority: White, joined by Burger, Marshall, Blackmun, Powell, Rehnquist
- Dissent: Douglas, joined by Brennan, Stewart

Laws applied
- 25 U.S.C. § 461 et seq.

Mescalero Apache Tribe v. Jones, 411 U.S. 145 (1973), was a case in which the Supreme Court of the United States held that a state could tax tribal, off-reservation business activities but could not impose a tax on tribal land, which was exempt from all forms of property taxes.

== Background ==
The Mescalero Apache Tribe, doing business as the Sierra Blanca Ski Enterprises, run a ski resort in New Mexico, outside of the boundaries of the Mescalero Apache Reservation. New Mexico wanted to tax the gross receipts from the business and to tax improvements made to the land owned by the tribe and used for the resort. The tribe paid approximately US$32,000 under protest and sought a refund. The New Mexico State Commissioner of Revenue denied the claim and the New Mexico Court of Appeals affirmed. The New Mexico Supreme Court declined to hear the case and the tribe appealed to the United States Supreme Court, which granted certiorari to hear the case.

== Opinion of the Court ==
Justice Byron White delivered the opinion of the court. White found that if the tribe conducted off-reservation business they were liable for the corporate income taxes of New Mexico. The taxes on improvements to the land however were a different matter. Under the Indian Reorganization Act, 25 U.S.C. § 465, land acquired for tribes is to be held in trust for the tribe by the United States Department of the Interior and is exempt from state property taxes, including those that New Mexico sought for improvements to the land. The lower court decision was affirmed as to the income taxes and reversed as to the property taxes.

=== Dissent ===
Justice William O. Douglas dissented. He would have held that the tribal ski resort was a federal instrumentality and that the state had no authority to impose a corporate income tax.

== See also ==
- Ramah Navajo School Board, Inc. v. Bureau of Revenue of New Mexico
- List of United States Supreme Court cases, volume 411
