= Rice v. Rehner =

- Supreme Court of the United States

Argued March 21, 1983 Decided July 1, 1983
- Full case name: Baxter Rice, Individually and as Director of the Department of Alcoholic Beverage Control of California v. Eva Rehner
- Citations: 463 U.S. 713 (more) 103 S. Ct. 3291; 77 L. Ed. 2d 961

Case history
- Prior: Rehner v. Rice, 678 F.2d 1340 (9th Cir. 1982)

Holding
- California may properly require respondent to obtain a state license in order to sell liquor for off-premises consumption.

Court membership
- Chief Justice Warren E. Burger Associate Justices William J. Brennan Jr. · Byron White; Thurgood Marshall · Harry Blackmun; Lewis F. Powell Jr. · William Rehnquist; John P. Stevens · Sandra Day O'Connor

Case opinions
- Majority: O'Connor, joined by Burger, White, Powell, Rehnquist, Stevens
- Dissent: Blackmun, joined by Brennan, Marshall

Laws applied
- 18 U.S.C. § 1161

Rice v. Rehner, 463 U.S. 713 (1983), was a United States Supreme Court case in which the Court held California may properly require respondent to obtain a state license in order to sell liquor for off-premises consumption.

== Background ==
Eva Rehner was a federally licensed Indian trader who operated a general store on the Pala Indian Reservation, a Native American (Indian) reservation in what is currently San Diego, California. A 1983 ruling required Rehner to obtain a state license in order to sell liquor, which would cost Rehner 6,000 dollars. California refused Rehner an exemption from the state liquor licensing scheme and she filed a suit against the Director of the Department of Alcoholic Beverage Control of California in U.S. District Court. The District Court dismissed the suit, holding that Rehner was required to have a state license under 18 U.S.C. § 1161. The Court of Appeals reversed, holding that § 1161 preempted state law over tribal liquor sales in Indian country.

== Opinion of the Court ==
Justice Justice O'Connor delivered the opinion of the Court. O'Connor noted that there was no history of liquor regulation by Indian tribes. The statute in question, 18 U.S.C. § 1161 authorized the state regulation of liquor with Indian tribes. Both the states and the tribes are authorized to regulate liquor under the statute. Here the application of the state liquor laws is specifically authorized by Congress and does not interfere with federal policies concerning the reservation.

The decision of the Ninth Circuit was reversed and remanded for action in compliance with the Court's opinion.

=== Dissent ===
Justice Blackmun dissented. Blackmun noted that 25 U.S.C. § 261 provided that "The Commissioner of Indian Affairs shall have the sole power and authority to appoint traders to the Indian tribes and to make such rules and regulations as he may deem just and proper specifying the kind and quantity of goods and the prices at which such goods shall be sold to the Indians." Blackmun believed that this prevented state regulation of Indian traders.

== Alcohol Regulation Among Indigenous Tribes in the U.S. ==
There is significant cultural diversity among Native American tribes, and this includes cultural relationships to alcohol. In many nations, alcohol was a trade commodity, a medicinal agent, and a bargaining tool, among other purposes. During the colonial period, British colonists deliberately used alcohol as a tool for trading and for promoting amiability between colonists and Indigenous nations. Many nations saw alcohol, therefore, as an item representing good will and alcohol became a symbol of the integrity of the relationship with colonists. For example, members of Cherokee and Sawnee nations, prior to the Indian Removal Act of 1830, used alcohol as a religious, political, and medicinal tool. As drinking became more pervasive among nations trading with the British and French colonists, attitudes of Indigenous Nations towards drinking ranged from temperance to openly trading the intoxicant.^{,}

British colonists regulated the trade of liquor between colonists and Indigenous nations, often ignoring nations’ requests to remove liquor traders from their area. Nations attempting to regulate or curtail the trade of alcohol pushed back against the colonial government, creating ordinances unilaterally applicable within their borders, or bargaining with local and national governments to aid them in regulating liquor trade participants within their nations and participants who are members of the United States. Many nations made significant attempts to either regulate or altogether halt the trade of liquor in their borders and in between their borders and officially non-Native territory.^{,} However, the United States government saw liquor regulation as a bridge to sovereignty, which the United States could not entertain if it was to achieve its goal of assimilation Indigenous nations into western culture through trade dependence. The lack of government support in controlling the trade consequently made it easy for liquor to slip into nations’ borders unnoticed.

In many Indigenous nations, the impulse for people to drink was exacerbated by ‘cultural anomie’ in the wake of the destruction of normal societal patterns caused by colonial oppression.^{,} With the destruction of ritual hunting grounds, the disruption of long-standing social orders, and over ninety percent of the Indigenous population gone by the end of the colonial period due to oppression and disease. (Mancall) This led many men in particular to heavy drinking, theft and violence in an attempt to reclaim their sense of masculinity and return to themselves a sense of control and social order.

Although drinking was an equally prevalent part of colonial life, colonists were openly critical of the behavioral effects of alcohol when those effects were present in Indigenous peoples. Colonists originally intended to forcefully assimilate Indigenous peoples into western culture, seeing them as capable of assimilating.^{,} That attitude shifted as the concept of race became popularized during the Enlightenment period. Colonists began to racialize indigenous peoples, counting intemperance and constant drunkenness as a few of their racial attributes, which the colonists regarded with vitriol. Colonists’ views on Indigenous drinking habits pervade contemporary views and stereotypes of Indigenous drinking to date; most evidence of Native Americans drinking that has survived into the modern era comes from colonial observation.

== Criticisms of Rice v. Rehner ==
Critics of the Rice v. Rehner ruling note that Justice Justice O’Conner’s opinion presents a narrow view of the precedent for tribal sovereignty set in White Mountain Apache Tribe v. Bracker, 448 U.S. 136 (1980). Many legal scholars agree that Bracker’s illustration of the "tradition" of Native American sovereignty is one that characterizes sovereignty as tribes’ long-standing right to self-government.^{,} Justice Justice O’Conner, however, narrows this reading of traditional rights to specific acts that non-Indigenous people deem, in general terms, traditionally Native American.^{,} (Mikkanen, Rehner at 719) Scholars have noted that this narrow reading of Bracker is liable to create a positive feedback loop with respect to state encroachment on tribal sovereignty. This sentiment was echoed in Justice Heffernan’s dissent in Vilas County v. Chapman, 361 N.W.2d 699, 122 Wis.2d 211 (Wis. 1985):

"As I read Rice and other Supreme Court decisions, what *221 is required is not that the tribe have a history of regulation and enforcement in a particular area, but that it have a historical right of autonomy or self-regulation in that area according to the majority and I agree the Band has the power to regulate civil traffic matters. I disagree with the majority's test of self-government. Its test is whether the Band has enacted laws on a particular subject matter. The power to regulate, the right to self-government, must include not only the power to decide to enact laws, but also the power to decide not to enact laws on that subject."

== See also ==
- List of United States Supreme Court cases, volume 463
