= South Dakota v. Bourland =

- Supreme Court of the United States

Argued March 2, 1993 Decided June 14, 1993
- Full case name: South Dakota v. Gregg Bourland, etc., et al.
- Citations: 508 U.S. 679 (more) 113 S. Ct. 2309; 124 L. Ed. 2d 606; 1993 U.S. LEXIS 4034

Case history
- Prior: South Dakota v. Bourland, 949 F.2d 984 (8th Cir. 1991).

Holding
- Reversed, held that Congress specifically abrogated treaty rights with the Cheyenne River Sioux Tribe as to hunting and fishing rights on reservation lands that were acquired for a reservoir.

Court membership
- Chief Justice William Rehnquist Associate Justices Byron White · Harry Blackmun; John P. Stevens · Sandra Day O'Connor; Antonin Scalia · Anthony Kennedy; David Souter · Clarence Thomas

Case opinions
- Majority: Thomas, joined by Rehnquist, White, Stevens, O'Connor, Scalia, Kennedy
- Dissent: Blackmun, joined by Souter

Laws applied
- Fort Laramie Treaty of 1868 (15 Stat 635); Flood Control Act of 1944 (58 Stat 887); Cheyenne River Act of September 3, 1954 (68 Stat 1191)

South Dakota v. Bourland, 508 U.S. 679 (1993), was a case in which the Supreme Court of the United States held that Congress specifically abrogated treaty rights with the Cheyenne River Sioux Tribe as to hunting and fishing rights on reservation lands that were acquired for a reservoir.

== Background ==
=== History ===
In 1868, the Fort Laramie Treaty, 15 Stat. 635 was signed between the United States and the Sioux Indian Tribe. This reservation covered almost the entire present day state of South Dakota, but was broken up into six separate reservations in 1889, one of which was the Cheyenne River Indian Reservation.

In 1934, in accordance with the Indian Reorganization Act, the Cheyenne River Sioux Tribe developed a tribal constitution and enacted tribal laws regulating hunting and fishing on the reservation. In 1953, Congress passed Public Law 280 which granted South Dakota certain jurisdiction over the reservation, but reserved tribal hunting and fishing laws and regulations to tribal jurisdiction.

In 1944, Congress passed the Flood Control Act which allowed the government to purchase land along the Missouri River to build dams. In 1950, Congress passed the Cheyenne River Act which transferred approximately 105,000 acres (420 km^{2}; 164 sq mi) acres from the tribe for approximately $10,000,000.00. The act specifically reserved hunting and fishing rights on the land to the tribe. The tribe and South Dakota thereafter negotiated hunting and fishing agreements where the tribe would honor state hunting licenses on the reservation, until 1988 when they could not reach an agreement. The tribe then stated it would not honor state hunting licenses.

=== Lower Courts ===
South Dakota then filed suit in the United States District Court for the District of South Dakota, seeking an injunction to prevent the tribe from enforcing its regulations on non-Indian fee land and land taken under the Cheyenne River Act, but was still within the reservation boundaries. The District Court found for South Dakota and issued the injunction. The tribe then appealed to the Eighth Circuit Court of Appeals. The Court of Appeals affirmed in part, reversed in part, and remanded in part.

The Eighth Circuit held that the tribe had the authority to regulate hunting and fishing since Congress did not explicitly revoke that authority, but that on non-Indian fee land that had been acquired by the government, the tribe's authority had been divested unless certain exceptions were met, to be determined by further action in the District Court. South Dakota appealed and the United States Supreme Court granted certiorari.

== Opinion of the Court ==
Reversed. Justice Clarence Thomas delivered the opinion of the court. Thomas first went through the Cheyenne River Act and covered what each relevant section stated. Thomas noted that there was a difference between the 104,420 acres (422.6 km^{2}; 163.16 sq mi) of trust land transferred by the tribe under the Cheyenne River Act and the 18,000 acres (73 km^{2}; 28 sq mi) of non-Indian owned fee lands transferred under the Flood Control Act. Citing Menominee Tribe v. United States, 391 U.S. 404 (1968) and Montana v. United States, 450 U.S. 544 (1981), Thomas noted that Congress has the power to abrogate treaty provisions but that they must "clearly express its intent to do so." Although Thomas indicated that such an abrogation be clearly expressed, he found that the statutes in question "implies the loss of regulatory jurisdiction" by the tribe. Although Thomas found that the statute implied the loss rather than clearly stated it, he reversed the opinion of the Eighth Circuit Court.

=== Dissent ===
Justice Harry Blackmun issued a dissenting opinion, joined by Justice Souter. Blackmun went into detail pointing out the difference between an explicit abrogation and an implied abrogation. Blackmun would have upheld the decision of the Court of Appeals.

== See also ==
- List of United States Supreme Court cases, volume 508
