= Seminole Nation v. United States =

- Supreme Court of the United States

Argued April 1–2, 1942 Decided May 11, 1942
- Full case name: Seminole Nation v. United States
- Citations: 316 U.S. 286 (more) 62 S. Ct. 1049; 86 L. Ed. 1480; 1942 U.S. LEXIS 608

Court membership
- Chief Justice Harlan F. Stone Associate Justices Owen Roberts · Hugo Black; Stanley F. Reed · Felix Frankfurter; William O. Douglas · Frank Murphy; James F. Byrnes · Robert H. Jackson

Case opinions
- Majority: Murphy, joined by Stone, Roberts, Black, Frankfurter, Douglas, Byrnes
- Dissent: Jackson
- Reed took no part in the consideration or decision of the case.

Seminole Nation v. United States, 316 U.S. 286 (1942), was a United States Supreme Court case.

== Background ==
The original suit was decided by the Court of Claims in favor of petitioner, the Seminole Nation, in the amount of $1,317,087.27. The Supreme Court reversed this decision for want of jurisdiction. The jurisdictional barrier was then removed by statute, and the Seminole Nation of Oklahoma filed a second amended petition in the Court of Claims, reasserting the six claims previously denied by the Supreme Court. The Court of Claims denied three claims entirely, allowed one in full and two in part. Seminole Nation was awarded $18,388.30. However, the United States was entitled to gratuity offsets in the amount of $705,337.33, and as such, the second amended petition was dismissed. The Supreme Court granted certiorari on a petition challenging the lower court's decision on each of the five claims disallowed in whole or in part. The Court also agreed to review the items which the Court of Claims included in the list of gratuity offsets.

== Opinion of the Court ==
=== Holding ===
The Court found three of the Seminole Nation's five claims for reimbursement from the United States government to be without merit. The remaining two claims were remanded to the lower Court of Claims to determine whether the government breached its fiduciary duty to the Seminoles by making payments to tribal leaders with knowledge of the potential for mismanagement of funds.

=== Relevance ===
This case is often cited "as authority for the application of fiduciary principles to the government in the administration of Indian affairs."

=== Case summary ===
The Seminole Nation's claims for reimbursement related to language contained in the Treaties of 1856 and 1866 and to various agreements and acts of Congress. The Nation's claims were divided into five separate items. The Court dismissed the first claim for reimbursement, finding the Treaty of March 21, 1866 released the government of its obligation to pay the outstanding balance owed under the Treaty of August 7, 1856. The third claim for reimbursement was disallowed upon the finding that the annual interest from the trust fund established under the Treaty of 1866 was, in fact, directed to its designated purpose (support of local schools). The fourth claim is also in reference to the Treaty of 1866, which provided additionally that the Government construct, "at an expense not exceeding ten thousand ($10,000) dollars, suitable agency buildings' on the Seminole reservation." The Court of Claims found that $10,000 was expended to fulfill this treaty obligation in 1872, and an agency building was erected on the reservation in 1873. Seminole Nation did not claim that the building was unsuitable and, furthermore, the treaty required the Government to erect a suitable building not in excess of $10,000. The Government's obligation was fulfilled and the fourth claim was disallowed.

With regard to the second and fifth claims, the cause was remanded to the lower court for further material findings of fact.

The second claim concerned language from Article VIII of the Treaty of 1856 which provided that the government would establish a $500,000 trust fund with the annual interest to be distributed equally among the individual members of the Seminole Tribe. During the years 1870-1874 the government made payments totaling $66,422.64. A portion of this amount was paid to the tribal treasurer and the remainder was paid to the designated creditors of the tribe. This arrangement for distribution was requested by the Seminole General Council.

The Seminole Nation argued that the Treaty was violated since annuity payments were made to the General Council when the Treaty stipulated that "payments were to be made per capita for the benefit of each individual Indian." The Court found merit to this claim and cited "a well established principle of equity that a third party who pays money to a fiduciary for the benefit of the beneficiary, with knowledge that the fiduciary intends to misappropriate the money or otherwise be false to his trust, is a participant in the breach of trust and liable therefore to the beneficiary." The Commissioner of Indian Affairs received reports as early as 1870 discussing the unjust distribution of funds, "recommend[ing] that the provisions of the treaty be rigidly enforced[.]" The Court went on to describe Government's responsibility to the Indian tribes as a "moral obligation[] of the highest responsibility and trust." It is with this standard that the Court remanded the case to the Court of Claims for further review.

The fifth claim for reimbursement was in regard to payments made "during the fiscal years 1899 to 1907," which totaled $864,702.58. These payments were made to the Seminole tribal treasurer. Though the Court found the government did not act improperly by making payment to the treasurer (as the provision did not stipulate per capita distribution), the Court stated it could still be found liable if it violated its fiduciary duty in the manner discussed above. It was documented that the Commission of the Five Civilized Tribes notified Congress and the Secretary of the Interior of the rampant corruption throughout tribal governments before the payments were made to the Seminole treasurer. More pointedly, the Secretary of the Interior and the Commissioner of Indian Affairs were informed in January 1898 of "complaints of misgovernment, venality, and fraudulent conduct on the part of Seminole leaders[.]"

The Court remanded the two claims to the lower Court of Claims for further findings of fact, to determine whether the government breached its fiduciary duty. The Court provided instruction that if government officials made payments to tribal leaders with knowledge of their corruption and potential mismanagement, the government would be found liable and responsible for reimbursing the Seminole Nation.

Lastly, the Court ruled that in reviewing the gratuitous offsets, the Court of Claims must designate the precise expenditures to be offset against the Government's liability so as to avoid a double credit. This portion was also remanded to the lower court for further review.
