= American Fur Co. v. United States =

- Supreme Court of the United States

Argued March 3, 1829 Decided March 11, 1829
- Full case name: Sundry Goods, Wares & Merchandises, American Fur Co. v. United States
- Citations: 27 U.S. 358 (more) 2 Pet. 358; 7 L. Ed. 450

Case history
- Prior: Writ of error from the district court of the United States for the district of Ohio

Holding
- Held that the agent's acts and statements bound the principal; that all goods were subject to seizure and forfeiture; but that the instructions on where in Indian territory the seizure could be made was in error to the point that a new trial was required.

Court membership
- Chief Justice John Marshall Associate Justices Bushrod Washington · William Johnson; Gabriel Duvall · Joseph Story; Smith Thompson

Case opinion
- Majority: Washington, joined by unanimous

American Fur Co. v. United States, 27 U.S. (2 Pet.) 358 (1829), was a United States Supreme Court case in which the Court held that the American Fur Company agent's acts and statements bound the company; that all goods were subject to seizure and forfeiture; but that the instructions on where in Indian territory the seizure could be made was in error to the point that a new trial was required.

== Background ==
On September 24, 1824, a licensed Indian trader, William H. Wallace, was caught with seven kegs of whiskey and one keg of shrub among his goods he had for trade with the Indians. The local District Attorney moved for the district court to forfeit all of the goods to the government, and following a trial in which John Davis, an employee of Wallace, testified about the alcohol, the jury agreed and forfeited the goods to government.

== Supreme Court ==
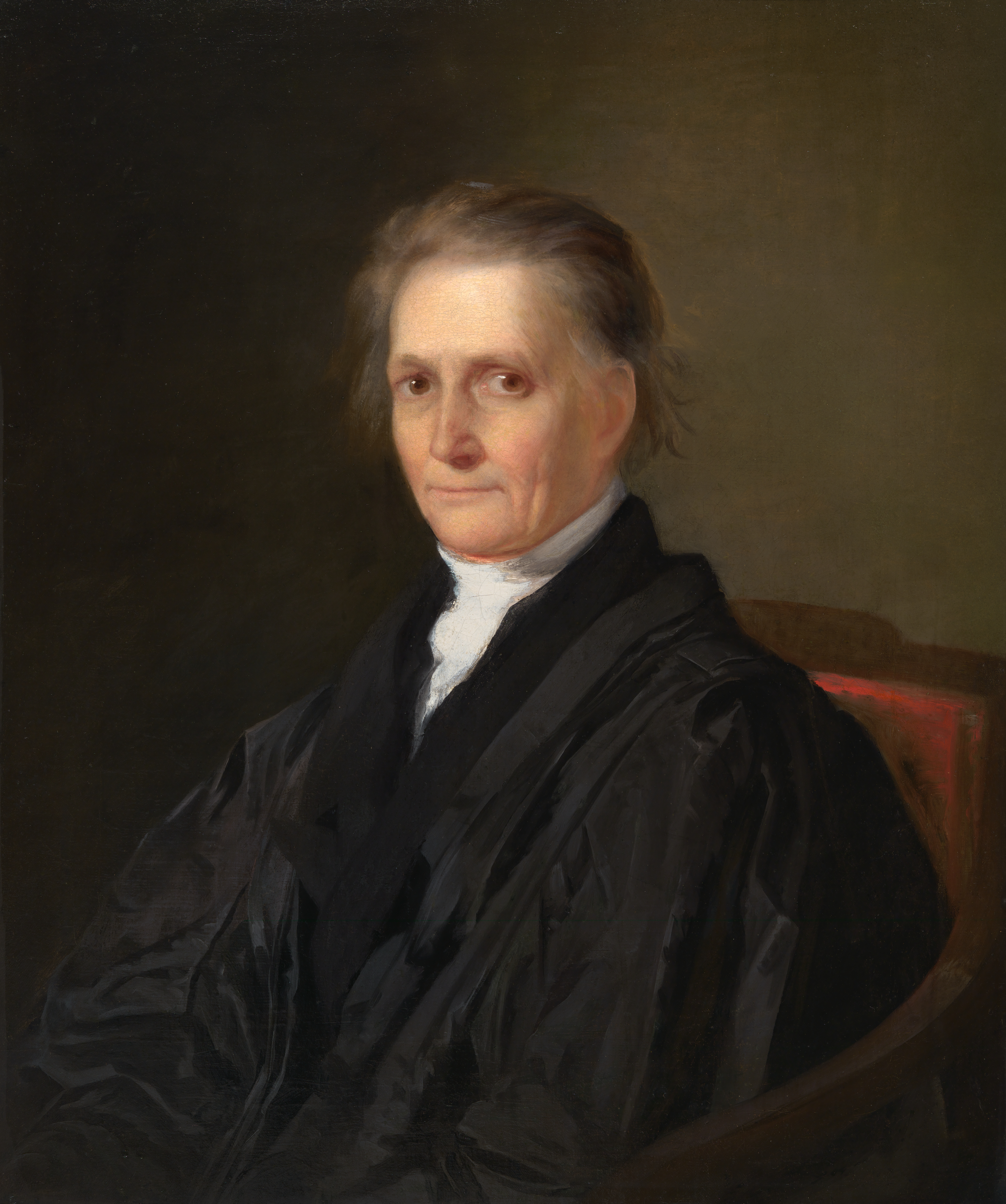
Justice Washington, author of the majority opinion

Justice Bushrod Washington delivered the opinion of the Court. Washington noted that Davis was an agent of Wallace, and that his statements could bind the principal. He further stated that all of the goods were subject to seizure, not just the alcohol, but that the instructions as to the location of the seizure to the jury was so confusing that a new trial was required.
