= Duro v. Reina =

- Supreme Court of the United States

Argued November 29, 1989 Decided May 29, 1990
- Full case name: Albert Duro v. Edward Reina, Chief of Police, Salt River Department of Public Safety, Salt River Pima-Maricopa Indian Community, et al.
- Docket no.: 88-6546
- Citations: 495 U.S. 676 (more) 110 S. Ct. 2053; 109 L. Ed. 2d 693; 1990 U.S. LEXIS 2696; 58 U.S.L.W. 4643
- Argument: Oral argument

Case history
- Prior: Duro v. Reina, No. CIV. 84-2107 PHX.WPC, 1985 WL 260639 (D. Ariz. Jan. 8, 1985), vacated by 851 F.2d 1136 (9th Cir. 1987)
- Subsequent: On remand, 910 F.2d 673 (9th Cir. 1990); on remand, No. CIV 84–2107–PHX–RGS, 1994 WL 714015 (D. Ariz. Nov. 16, 1990)

Holding
- An Indian tribe may not assert criminal jurisdiction over a nonmember Indian.

Court membership
- Chief Justice William Rehnquist Associate Justices William J. Brennan Jr. · Byron White; Thurgood Marshall · Harry Blackmun; John P. Stevens · Sandra Day O'Connor; Antonin Scalia · Anthony Kennedy

Case opinions
- Majority: Kennedy, joined by Rehnquist, White, Blackmun, Stevens, O'Connor, Scalia
- Dissent: Brennan, joined by Marshall

Laws applied
- Indian Civil Rights Act of 1968, 25 U.S.C. §§ 1301 et seq.
- Superseded by
- Department of Defense; Appropriations Act of 1991

Duro v. Reina, 495 U.S. 676 (1990), was a United States Supreme Court case in which the Court concluded that Indian tribes could not prosecute Indians who were members of other tribes for crimes committed by those nonmember Indians on their reservations. The decision was not well received by the tribes, because it defanged their criminal codes by depriving them of the power to enforce them against anyone except their own members. In response, Congress amended a section of the Indian Civil Rights Act, 25 U.S.C. § 1301, to include the power to "exercise criminal jurisdiction over all Indians" as one of the powers of self-government.

== Background ==
Map of Maricopa County showing Salt River Indian Reservation in red

=== Reservation ===
The Salt River Indian Reservation, located east of Scottsdale, Arizona, is home to the Salt River Pima Maricopa Indian Community. The reservation was established in 1879 by executive order to recognize the occupation of the land by Pima and Maricopa Indians. The Indians moved from the Gila River Indian Reservation due to white settlers upstream diverting water from the Gila River so that the Indians could no longer farm there. Although the Indians had complained at the Gila River reservation, nothing was done to stop the theft of their water, where at the Salt River, the tribes were upstream of the settlers and did not have the same problem. In 1926, the Bureau of Indian Affairs (BIA) created a Pima Advisory Council and in 1934 the two tribes adopted a constitution for the reservation. The current constitution dates from 1940.

=== Facts ===
Albert Duro was not a member of the Salt River Pima Maricopa Indian Community. He was from California and was a member of the Torres-Martinez Desert Cahuilla Indians; thus, he was not eligible for membership in the Salt River Pima Maricopa Indian Community, and could not vote in tribal elections, hold tribal office, or serve on tribal juries.

Duro lived on the Salt River Indian Reservation with a "woman friend" and worked for the tribe's construction company, PiCopa Construction. In 1984, he was accused of killing a 14-year-old boy inside the boundaries of the reservation. Initially, Duro was charged with murder and aiding and abetting murder in federal court, but the prosecution dismissed those charges without prejudice. Duro was handed over to Salt River tribal authorities, who charged Duro with illegally firing a weapon because under federal law, Indian tribes are limited to prosecuting misdemeanor crimes. The tribal courts denied Duro's motion to dismiss for lack of jurisdiction, and then Duro filed a petition for a writ of habeas corpus in the United States District Court for the District of Arizona.

The district court granted the writ and ordered Duro released. Under Oliphant v. Suquamish Indian Tribe, 435 U.S. 191 (1978), the tribal court had no jurisdiction over non-Indians. If the district court were to find that the tribal court had jurisdiction over Indians who were not members of the tribe, it reasoned that would violate the equal protection guarantee of freedom from discrimination based on race. The Ninth Circuit reversed. It read the Supreme Court's decision in United States v. Wheeler, 435 U.S. 313 (1978), which stated that tribal courts do not have jurisdiction over nonmembers, as supported by an "equivocal" history, and concluded that federal statutory law allowed tribal jurisdiction over all Indians, not simply members. Finally, it concluded that holding that tribes lacked criminal jurisdiction over nonmembers would create a "jurisdictional void," since only the state might have the power to prosecute the nonmember, and the state may lack the power or resources to do so. The U.S. Supreme Court agreed to review the Ninth Circuit's decision.

== Opinion of the Court ==
In an opinion by Justice Kennedy, the Court described this case as falling at the "intersection" of its prior decisions in Oliphant and Wheeler. In Oliphant, the Court held that the inherent sovereignty of Indian tribes did not allow them to have criminal jurisdiction over non-Indians who commit crimes on the reservation. And in Wheeler, the Court held that tribes retain their jurisdiction to prosecute their members for crimes committed on the reservation. The question this case posed was whether "the sovereignty retained by the tribes in their dependent status within our scheme of government includes the power of criminal jurisdiction over nonmembers." The Court reasoned that the decisions in Oliphant and Wheeler compelled a negative answer to this question.

The sovereignty retained by the Indian tribes is "of a unique and limited character." A fully sovereign government would have the power to prosecute all crimes that take place within its territorial boundaries, but the Indian tribes are no longer sovereign in that sense. The sovereignty retained by the tribes to prosecute their own members stems from their power to govern themselves in order to maintain "their own unique customs and social order." When the tribes were relegated to dependents of the federal government, they did not lose this inherent power. Rather, the tribes were divested only of the power to regulate relations between themselves and nonmembers.

The distinction between members and nonmembers is the critical distinction in this case, not the distinction between Indian and non-Indians. Thus, states may not impose taxes on transactions between members that take place on reservations, because this would interfere with the sovereignty of tribes vis-à-vis their own members. Tribes also retain the power to regulate hunting on lands they own or lands held in trust for them by the United States, but not on lands held in fee. And although other decisions of the Court had recognized broader retained powers in the civil context, criminal powers of Indian tribes were strictly limited to members because "the exercise of criminal jurisdiction subjects a person not only to the adjudicatory power of the tribunal, but also to the prosecuting power of the tribe, and involves a far more direct intrusion on personal liberties." Thus, Indian tribes may only prosecute members for crimes committed on their reservations. Because Duro was not a member of the Salt River Pima-Maricopa Indian Community, that tribe did not have the power to prosecute him for the crime of illegally firing a weapon.

The tribes argued that, historically, tribes had jurisdiction over all Indians regardless of membership. For example, federal statutes used the word "Indian" without regard to membership, to refer to the "family of Indians." Courts of "Indian offenses," established by the Department of the Interior for tribes without their own functioning court systems, historically exercised jurisdiction over all Indians without regard to membership, and continue to do so. But the Court responded that federal statutes had always referred to federal programs, and never to the power of tribes with respect to individual Indians. "The historical record prior to the creation of modern tribal courts shows little federal attention to the individual tribes' powers as between themselves or over one another's members. Scholars who do find treaties or other sources illuminating have only divided in their conclusions." After the federal government allowed the tribes to "express [their] retained tribal sovereignty" by creating their own tribal courts, the Secretary of the Interior still had to approve the legal codes the tribes created before the courts of Indian offenses would yield to the tribes own courts. Written opinions of the Solicitor General of the Department of the Interior consistently affirmed the power of the tribes over their own members, but went no further. In light of the historical record, the Court was not "persuaded that external criminal jurisdiction is an accepted part of the courts' function."

The Court could not ignore the fact that Duro was also a citizen of the United States, entitled to all the privileges and immunities that attach to that status. One right a citizen of the United States enjoys is the right to due process of law, which protects them from "unwarranted intrusions on their personal liberty. Criminal trial and punishment is so serious and intrusion on personal liberty that its exercise over non-Indian citizens was a power necessarily surrendered by the tribes in their submission to the overriding sovereignty of the United States." Tribal courts do not necessarily afford defendants the full range of protections afforded defendants in federal courts by the Bill of Rights. Because tribal members may participate in tribal governance, the Court approves of tribal members being subject to the criminal jurisdiction of their own tribes. Because nonmembers do not participate in tribal governance, the Court felt it was too great an intrusion to allow tribes to prosecute nonmembers.

Finally, the Court rejected the argument that not allowing tribes to prosecute nonmembers, those nonmembers would escape prosecution altogether for criminal activity engaged in within tribal boundaries. The federal government retains the power to prosecute felonies that take place on reservations. Tribes retain the power to expel undesirable persons. Tribal authorities may still arrest the nonmember and detain him until he can be handed over to authorities who do have the power to prosecute the nonmember. The tribe pointed out that state authorities can lack the power to prosecute crimes committed by nonmembers on reservations; Arizona, for instance, expressly disclaims this prosecutorial authority. But Congress has allowed states to assume this power, and Arizona is free to take up Congress's invitation. Finally, if the tribes still believed that there remained a "jurisdictional void," despite these options, they could persuade Congress to give it to them.

=== Dissenting opinion ===
Justice Brennan disagreed that the Court's holding did not create a jurisdictional void. "The existence of a jurisdictional gap is not an independent justification for finding tribal jurisdiction, but rather is relevant to determining congressional intent. The unlikelihood that Congress intended to create a jurisdictional void in which no sovereign has the power to prosecute an entire class of crimes should inform our understanding of the assumptions about tribal power upon which Congress legislated." Accordingly, Justice Brennan believed the Court should have read the historical evidence in such a way that supported Congress's intent to allow Indian tribes to exert jurisdiction over nonmembers. Furthermore, Justice Brennan did not accept the Court's argument that the fact that nonmembers were citizens of the United States counseled against allowing tribes to exert jurisdiction over nonmembers. If that was true, he said, it would also be true that tribes could not exert jurisdiction over their own members either. Nor had the Court ever held that participation in the political process was a prerequisite to exercising criminal jurisdiction over a citizen. If this were true, then states could never prosecute nonresidents or aliens.

== Aftermath ==
Congress quickly addressed the jurisdictional gap that emerged from the Court's ruling by amending the Indian Civil Rights Act in 1990 as part of the Department of Defense Appropriations Act of 1991, which was signed into law on November 5, 1990. Nearly fourteen years later, the Supreme Court ruled on the constitutionality of this amendment to 25 U.S.C. § 1301(2) in United States v. Lara (2004), upholding the amendment to the Indian Civil Rights Act and effectively overturning Duro v. Reina.

== See also ==
- Tribal sovereignty in the United States
- List of United States Supreme Court cases, volume 495
- List of United States Supreme Court cases
- Lists of United States Supreme Court cases by volume
- List of United States Supreme Court cases by the Rehnquist Court
