= Yellen v. Confederated Tribes of the Chehalis Reservation =

Yellen v. Confederated Tribes of the Chehalis Reservation Alaska Native Village Corporation Association v. Confederated Tribes of the Chehalis Reservation
- Supreme Court of the United States

Argued April 19, 2021 Decided June 25, 2021
- Full case name: Janet L. Yellen, Secretary of the Treasury v. Confederated Tribes of the Chehalis Reservation et al.; Alaska Native Village Corp. Association et al. v. Confederated Tribes of the Chehalis Reservation et al.
- Docket nos.: 20-543; 20-544
- Citations: 594 U.S. 338 (more)

Holding
- Alaska Native corporations are "Indian tribe[s]" under ISDA and thus eligible for funding under Title V of the CARES Act.

Court membership
- Chief Justice John Roberts Associate Justices Clarence Thomas · Stephen Breyer; Samuel Alito · Sonia Sotomayor; Elena Kagan · Neil Gorsuch; Brett Kavanaugh · Amy Coney Barrett

Case opinions
- Majority: Sotomayor, joined by Roberts, Breyer, Kavanaugh, Barrett; Alito (Parts I, II–C, II–D, III, and IV)
- Dissent: Gorsuch, joined by Thomas, Kagan

Laws applied
- Indian Self-Determination and Education Assistance Act of 1975 (ISDA); CARES Act

Yellen v. Confederated Tribes of the Chehalis Reservation, 594 U.S. 338 (2021), was a United States Supreme Court case dealing with the classification of Alaska Native corporations (ANCs) for purposes of receiving funds set-aside for tribal governments under the CARES Act. In a 6–3 decision issued in June 2021, the Court ruled that ANCs were considered to be "Indian tribes" and were eligible to receive the set-aside funds.

== Background ==
Twelve Alaska Native corporations (ANCs) were established in the 1971 Alaska Native Claims Settlement Act as for-profit corporations to operate businesses and services, often in the areas of oil and gas industry, to generate revenue that provides benefits to the Alaska Natives in the territories that they serve. This arrangement is unique to Alaska compared to native American tribes in the lower 48 states, where they operate their own tribal governments in recognized Indian reservations within federal law. Later, the Indian Self-Determination and Education Assistance Act of 1975 (ISDA) assured that both native American tribal governments and ANCs were given the self-autonomy to operate as governments for their respective peoples.

With the impact of the COVID-19 pandemic, the U.S. government passed the Coronavirus Aid, Relief, and Economic Security, or CARES Act in March 2020. The bill provided $2.2 trillion in relief funding to businesses, of which $8 billion was earmarked for "tribal governments". The Treasury Department, in interpreting the law, opted to set aside about $500 million of the $8 billion earmarked for ANCs.

The Treasury's decision was challenged separately by three Native tribes: the Navajo Nation, the Confederated Tribes of the Chehalis Reservation and the Cheyenne River Sioux Tribe. They asserted that the ANCs were not officially recognized as tribal governments under the language of ISDA, and thus were ineligible to receive any of the CARES funds. The Native tribes expressed concern that the amount of funds available to them would be diluted if the ANC set-aside were allowed to stand. The three suits were consolidated at the United States District Court for the District of Columbia. The district court ruled in favor of the Treasury Department, in that the ANCs could be considered tribal governments and eligible to receive CARES Act funds. The tribes appealed to the United States Court of Appeals for the District of Columbia Circuit, which reversed the District Court's ruling. The Circuit Court ruled that as no ANC is federally recognized, compared to the tribal governments, they fail to qualify for the CARES Act funding.

== Supreme Court ==
The Treasury Department under Treasury Secretary Janet Yellen, with the backing of the Trump administration, petitioned to the Supreme Court, as the D.C. District Court had created a circuit split with a prior case, Cook Inlet Native Assn. v. Bowen (1987) from the Ninth Circuit on the classification of ANCs. Several of the ANCs also filed a similar petition. The Supreme Court granted certiorari to both petitions in January 2021, consolidating both under Yellen. The new administration under Joe Biden continued to back the position that ANCs were recognized tribal governments prior to the oral argument.

The oral argument was held on April 19, 2021. Observers stated that the justices were poised to side with the federal government's position that ANCs were recognized tribal governments and thus eligible for funding. Justice Brett Kavanaugh said during the oral argument that "tens of thousands of Native Alaskans would be left out completely" if they ruled differently. There was agreement that the language of ISDA was not clear how ANCs were to be classified, and would become a matter of statutory interpretation of the ISDA.

The Court issued its opinion on June 25, 2021. The 6–3 decision reversed the D.C. Circuit and remanded the case for review, ruling that ANCs, under the ISDA, do qualify as federally-recognized tribal governments, and thus are eligible to receive CARES funds. Justice Sonia Sotomayor wrote the majority opinion which was joined by Chief Justice John Roberts and Justices Samuel Alito (in parts), Stephen Breyer, Kavanaugh, and Amy Coney Barrett. Sotomayor wrote "The Court today affirms what the Federal Government has maintained for almost half a century: ANCs are Indian tribes."

Justice Neil Gorsuch wrote a dissent, which was joined by Justices Clarence Thomas and Elena Kagan. Gorsuch wrote that by a statutory interpretation of ISDA, ANCs "are not 'recognized' as tribes eligible for the special programs and services provided by the United States to Indians because of their status as Indians."
