= Becerra v. San Carlos Apache Tribe =

- Supreme Court of the United States

Argued March 25, 2024 Decided June 6, 2024
- Full case name: Becerra, Secretary of Health and Human Services, et al. v. San Carlos Apache Tribe
- Docket no.: 23-250
- Citations: 602 U.S. 222 (more) 143 S.Ct. 1804, 216 L. Ed. 2d 540
- Argument: Oral argument

Holding
- The IHS must pay "contract support costs” not only to support IHS-funded activities, but also to support the tribe's expenditure of income collected from third parties.

Court membership
- Chief Justice John Roberts Associate Justices Clarence Thomas · Samuel Alito; Sonia Sotomayor · Elena Kagan; Neil Gorsuch · Brett Kavanaugh; Amy Coney Barrett · Ketanji Brown Jackson

Case opinions
- Majority: Roberts, joined by Sotomayor, Kagan, Gorsuch, Jackson
- Dissent: Kavanaugh, joined by Thomas, Alito, Barrett

Laws applied
- Indian Self-Determination and Education Assistance Act

Becerra v. San Carlos Apache Tribe, 602 U.S. 222 (2024), was a United States Supreme Court case which determined that the federal government must provide additional funding to cover some third-party administrative costs incurred by Native American tribes that operate their own health-care programs.

== Background ==
The Indian Self-Determination and Education Assistance Act (ISDA) provides Native Tribes the option to enter into a "self-determination contract" with the Indian Health Service to run their own healthcare programs that the IHS would have otherwise managed on its own. If this option is chosen by a tribe, the IHS provides the tribe with the same amount of money to run these programs as the IHS would have spent if it were to be administered by the IHS itself. Additionally, the Tribe may collect money from outside programs such as Medicare, Medicaid, and private insurers. The overhead and administrative costs that the Tribe must pay to run these services, known as "contract support costs", and which the IHS avoids, are therefore reimbursed by the IHS. Two tribes, the San Carlos Apache Tribe and the Northern Arapaho tribe filed separate suits alleging the IHS did not reimburse costs incurred in collecting income from third-party revenue streams. The Tribes contended that the IHS must, in addition to reimbursing the costs of typical IHS programs, also reimburse the tribes for the costs incurred when spending the money from private insurers on their healthcare programs. The Tribes subsequently sued the U.S. Department of Health and Human Services, IHS, and the United States, regarding the healthcare costs for the years of 2011–2013. The District Court of Arizona and District Court of Wyoming dismissed the claims for reimbursement of third-party-revenue-funded portions of Native healthcare of the respective Tribes, resulting in the Tribes appeal. Following the appeal, the Ninth Circuit and Tenth Circuit Court of Appeals issued respective reversals of the district courts in favor of the Tribes. These rulings contrasted that of a 2021 ruling by the D.C. Court of Appeals that determined the IHS was not required to provide reimbursement thus generating a circuit split. Following this, the U.S. Government appealed the consolidated cases to the Supreme Court for hearing.

== Supreme Court ==
=== Oral Arguments ===
Oral arguments were heard on March 25, 2024, with the Tribes represented by Adam Unikowsky, who represented the Northern Arapaho Tribe, and Sidley Austin, who represented the San Carlos Apache tribe. Unikowsky argued that the costs and reimbursements of the third-party revenue streams were in line with the goal of the tribes providing and managing their own health care, stating that "Ruling in the tribe's favor would further the purposes of the ISDA by promoting tribal self-determination and ensuring that adequate resources are available for health care in chronically-underserved communities". Additionally, Unikowsky emphasized that the nature of the IHS harmonized with the purpose of the legislation, noting that "Such costs are recoverable if they're incurred in connection with the operation of the federal program function, service or activity pursuant to the contract. The disputed costs in this case meet that description”.

Caroline A. Flynn of the Department of Justice represented the U.S. government, arguing that the use of reimbursement as described by the tribes was incongruent with prior allocation under the law. In addition, Flynn noted that applying 3rd party payments under IHS reimbursement jurisdiction could take funds from tribes working directly with the IHS and create a budgetary shortfall resulting in cuts to other vital IHS-provided programs, as the total IHS funding stood at $8 billion while contract support cost prior to such an expansion in reimbursement stood at roughly $1 billion. In contrasting the Tribe's arguments that the reimbursements were natural expectations for the IHS, Flynn contended that "What the tribes are arguing here is that [ISDA] also obligates IHS to subsidize the tribes' expenditures of funds that they don't receive from IHS under the contract. but rather collect from third parties as supplemental revenue. Statutory text and context refute that theory, which would upend how the statute has been administered for thirty-five years".

=== Majority ===
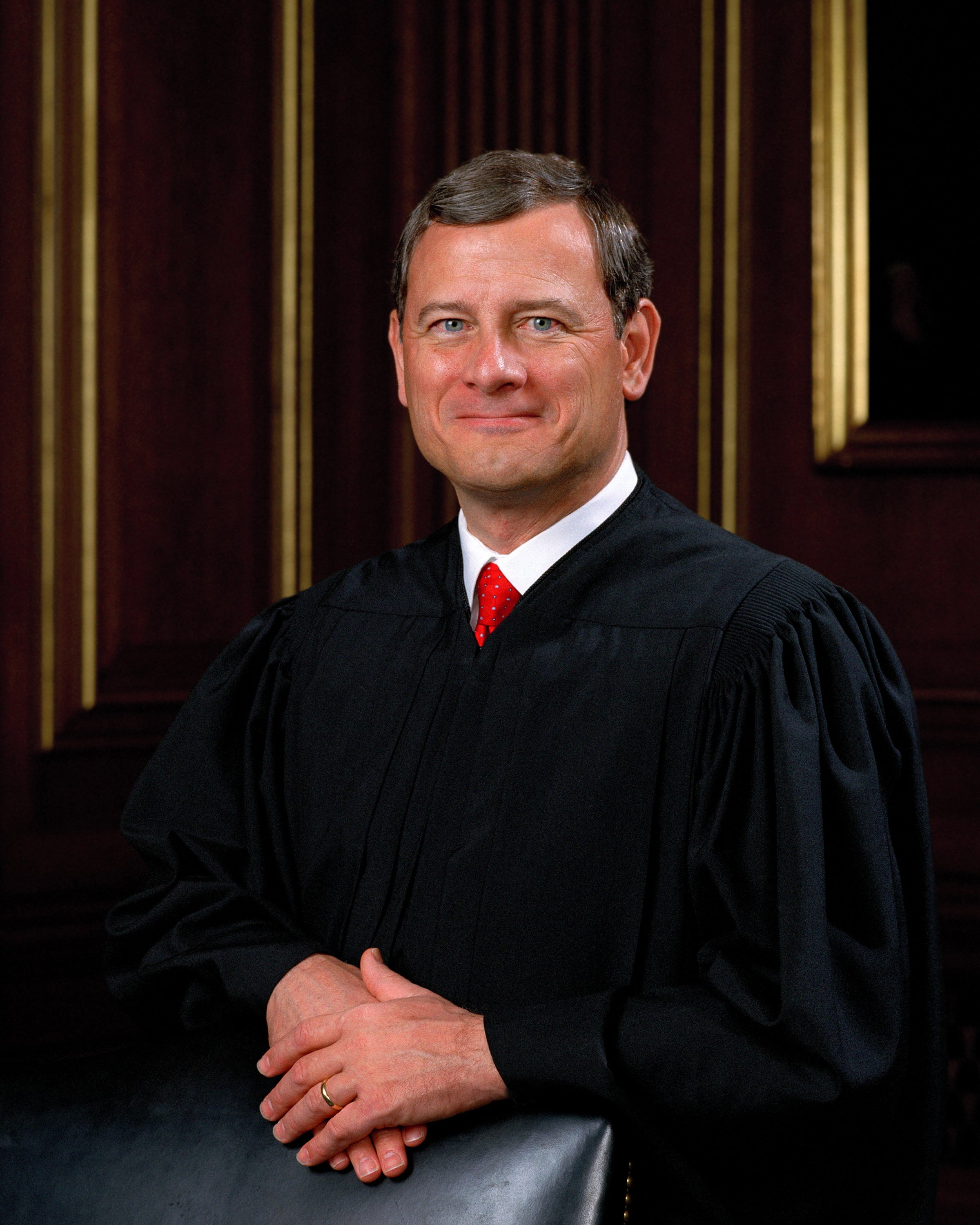
John Roberts delivered the opinion of the Court

Writing for the Majority, Chief Justice John Roberts, joined by Justices Sotomayor, Kagan, Gorsuch, and Jackson affirmed the argument by the tribes that 3rd party revenue streams were subject to reimbursement by the IHS. In his opinion, Roberts contended that the arguments of the government were inconsistent with the text and purpose of the ISDA as the ISDA was intended to provide an "effective voice in the planning and implementation of programs responsive to the true needs of their communities”, and noted that the potential of IHS not covering contract costs of outside programs would result in "a penalty on tribes for opting in favor of greater self-determination". Additionally, Roberts noted that the covering of costs was necessary to prevent a funding gap between the tribes and the federal government, stating that "if IHS does not cover those costs to support a tribe's expenditure of program income, the tribe would have to divert some program income to pay such costs, or it would have to pay them out of its own pocket [...] Either way, the tribe would face a systemic funding shortfall relative to IHS—a penalty for pursuing self-determination".

=== Dissent ===
Justice Brett Kavanaugh wrote the dissenting opinion joined by Justices Thomas, Alito, and Barrett. In his opinion, Kavanaugh countered the majority's reading of the ISDA, stipulating that the law did "not support the Court's decision" and that the decision was at odds with a long-standing understanding of payment, stating "For the past 30 years, the Executive Branch has interpreted the relevant statutory provisions […] to require tribes to pay those overhead costs out of the third-party income […] And Congress has never overturned that consistent Executive Branch practice". In addition, Kavanaugh commented that reimbursement by the IHS, had it been included, should have been specified via further deliberations of Congress, noting that "The extra federal money that the Court today green-lights does not come free".
