= Delaware Tribal Business Committee v. Weeks =

- Supreme Court of the United States

Argued November 10, 1976 Decided February 23, 1977
- Full case name: Delaware Tribal Business Committee, et al. v. Weeks, et al.
- Citations: 430 U.S. 73 (more) 97 S. Ct. 911; 51 L. Ed. 2d 173; 1977 U.S. LEXIS 48

Court membership
- Chief Justice Warren E. Burger Associate Justices William J. Brennan Jr. · Potter Stewart; Byron White · Thurgood Marshall; Harry Blackmun · Lewis F. Powell Jr. William Rehnquist · John P. Stevens

Case opinions
- Majority: Brennan, joined by Stewart, White, Marshall, Powell, Rehnquist
- Concurrence: Blackmun, joined by Burger
- Dissent: Stevens

Laws applied
- U.S. Const.

Delaware Tribal Business Committee v. Weeks, 430 U.S. 73 (1977), was a case decided by the United States Supreme Court.

== Background ==
On appeal from the United States District Court for the Western District of Oklahoma, the appellants, federally recognized Native American Tribe and the Secretary of the Interior, challenged a judgment of the United States District Court for the Western District of Oklahoma granting appellee, unrecognized Native American tribe, an injunction in an action seeking a declaration that appellee's exclusion from an award violated the United States Fifth Amendment Due Process Clause.

The Delaware Indians, who originally resided in the Northeastern United States, were gradually forced to move westward in the 19th century, and the tribe became geographically scattered. One group, the Cherokee Delawares, which initially had settled on a Kansas reservation as part of the tribe's main body, eventually moved to "Indian Country" in Oklahoma, became assimilated with the Cherokees, and is today a federally recognized tribe. Another group, the Absentee Delawares, which never joined the main body in Kansas but migrated to Oklahoma and settled with the Wichita and Caddo Indians, is also a federally recognized tribe. A third group, the Kansas Delawares, lived with the main body on the Kansas reservation but remained in Kansas when the Cherokee Delawares moved to Oklahoma; under an 1866 treaty, the Kansas Delawares elected to become UScitizens and to receive individual parcels of land in Kansas but had to dissolve their relationship with the tribe and participate in tribal assets only to the extent of a "just proportion" of the tribe's credits "then held in trust by the United States;" and the descendants of this group are not a federally recognized tribe.

The funds were being distributed to redress the breach of a tribal land treaty and appellee alleged that its exclusion violated its equal protection rights under the Due Process Clause of the Fifth Amendment. The district court rendered judgment in favor of appellee and enjoined further distributions. The appellate court affirmed and appellants sought review. The Court reversed, ruling that Congress's omission of appellee from the distribution did not offend due process and but tied rationally to the fulfillment of Congress' unique obligation toward the Indians.

The appellee was not a recognized tribal entity but was simply individual Indians with no vested rights in any tribal property. The statute distributed tribal, not individually-owned, property. The appellee had previously been excluded from a distribution of tribal assets. Congress deliberately limited the distribution under the statute to avoid problems that might attend a wider distribution.

The question was whether the Kansas Delawares were denied equal protection of the laws in violation of the Due Process Clause of the Fifth Amendment.

The Kansas Delawares were excluded from the distribution of funds authorized by an Act of Congress, which provided for distribution of funds only to the Absentee Delawares and Cherokee, pursuant to an award by the Indian Claims Commission, to redress a breach by the United States of an 1854 treaty with the Delaware tribe.

== Decision ==
- "The power of Congress over Indian Affairs may be of a plenary nature, but it is not absolute." US v. Alcea Band of Tillamooks, 329 U.S. 40 (1946), 329 U.S. 54.
- Since the exclusion of the Kansas Delawares from distribution under the act was "tied rationally to the fulfillment of Congress' unique obligation toward the Indians," 430 U.S. 85-89, the exclusion does not offend the Due Process Clause of the Fifth Amendment.
  - The Kansas Delawares are not a recognized tribal entity and so are individual Indians without vested rights in tribal property. Congress has authority over the distribution of property held by recognized tribes.
