= List of United States Supreme Court cases, volume 522 =

This is a list of all the United States Supreme Court cases from volume 522 of the United States Reports:

Case name	Citation	Date decided
Brown v. Williams	522 U.S. 1	1997
State Oil Co. v. Khan	522 U.S. 3	November 4, 1997
Bates v. United States	522 U.S. 23	1997
City of Monroe v. United States	522 U.S. 34	1997
Salinas v. United States	522 U.S. 52	1997
Foster v. Love	522 U.S. 67	1997
Jefferson v. City of Tarrant	522 U.S. 75	1997
Trest v. Cain	522 U.S. 87	1997
Hudson v. United States	522 U.S. 93	1997
Kalina v. Fletcher	522 U.S. 118	1997
General Electric Co. v. Joiner	522 U.S. 136	1997
Chicago v. International College of Surgeons	522 U.S. 156	1997
Bay Area Laundry and Dry Cleaning Pension Trust Fund v. Ferbar Corp. of Cal.	522 U.S. 192	1997
Fidelity Financial Services, Inc. v. Fink	522 U.S. 211	1998
Baker v. General Motors Corp.	522 U.S. 222	1998
Rogers v. United States	522 U.S. 252	1998
Lachance v. Erickson	522 U.S. 262	1998
Buchanan v. Angelone	522 U.S. 269	1998
Lunding v. New York Tax Appeals Tribunal	522 U.S. 287	1998
South Dakota v. Yankton Sioux Tribe	522 U.S. 329	1998
Allentown Mack Sales & Service, Inc. v. NLRB	522 U.S. 359	1998
Brogan v. United States	522 U.S. 398	1998
Oubre v. Entergy Operations, Inc.	522 U.S. 422	1998
Newsweek, Inc. v. Florida Dept. of Revenue	522 U.S. 442	1998
Arteaga v. United States Court of Appeals for Ninth Circuit	522 U.S. 446	1998
Regions Hospital v. Shalala	522 U.S. 448	1998
Rivet v. Regions Bank of La.	522 U.S. 470	1998
NCUA v. First National Bank & Trust	522 U.S. 479	1998
Alaska v. Native Village of Venetie Tribal Government	522 U.S. 520	1998
