= Alaska v. Native Village of Venetie Tribal Government =

- Supreme Court of the United States

Argued December 10, 1997 Decided February 25, 1998
- Full case name: Alaska, Petitioner v. Native Village of Venetie Tribal Government, et al.
- Citations: 522 U.S. 520 (more) 118 S. Ct. 948; 140 L. Ed. 2d 30; 1998 U.S. LEXIS 1449; 66 U.S.L.W. 4145; 98 Cal. Daily Op. Service 1335; 98 Daily Journal DAR 1839; 11 Fla. L. Weekly S 337; 1998 Colo. J. C.A.R. 891; 11 Fla. L. Weekly Fed. S 337

Case history
- Prior: 101 F.3d 1286 (9th Cir. 1996); 521 U.S. 1103 (1997).
- Subsequent: None

Court membership
- Chief Justice William Rehnquist Associate Justices John P. Stevens · Sandra Day O'Connor; Antonin Scalia · Anthony Kennedy; David Souter · Clarence Thomas; Ruth Bader Ginsburg · Stephen Breyer

Case opinion
- Majority: Thomas, joined by unanimous

Alaska v. Native Village of Venetie Tribal Government, 522 U.S. 520 (1998), was a United States Supreme Court case. The local tribal council in Venetie, Alaska, wanted to collect tax from non-tribal members doing business on tribal lands. The Supreme Court granted certiorari on appeal from the United States Court of Appeals for the Ninth Circuit, which had ruled in the tribe's favor, saying they occupied Indian Country.

The Court decided unanimously that the land was not the tribe's land subject to the tribal tax, even though it was owned by the tribe, because it was not part of a Native American reservation. Because all but one reservation in Alaska (the Annette Island reservation of the Tsimshian) had been eliminated by the Alaska Native Claims Settlement Act of 1971, the decision had the practical effect of prohibiting almost all Indian tribes in Alaska from collecting taxes for activities conducted on tribal land. Taxing authority is reserved as a right of the states and federal government.

The State of Alaska, the petitioner, was represented by John G. Roberts, who later became the Chief Justice of the United States. The respondent was represented by Heather Kendall-Miller, an attorney of Athabascan descent.
