= Ramah Navajo School Board, Inc. v. Bureau of Revenue of New Mexico =

- Supreme Court of the United States

Argued April 28, 1982 Decided July 2, 1982
- Full case name: Ramah Navajo School Board, Inc., et al. v. Bureau of Revenue of New Mexico
- Citations: 458 U.S. 832 (more) 102 S. Ct. 3394; 73 L. Ed. 2d 1174; 1982 U.S. LEXIS 50; 50 U.S.L.W. 5101

Case history
- Prior: Ramah Navajo School Board., Inc., et al. v. Bureau of Revenue of New Mexico, 625 P.2d 1225 (New Mex. App. 1980)
- Subsequent: 720 P.2d 1243 (New Mex. App. 1986)

Holding
- New Mexico was not authorized to impose taxes on a construction company building a school on a Native American reservation.

Court membership
- Chief Justice Warren E. Burger Associate Justices William J. Brennan Jr. · Byron White; Thurgood Marshall · Harry Blackmun; Lewis F. Powell Jr. · William Rehnquist; John P. Stevens · Sandra Day O'Connor

Case opinions
- Majority: Marshall, joined by Burger, Brennan, Blackmun, Powell, O'Connor
- Dissent: Rehnquist, joined by White, Stevens

Laws applied
- U.S. Const. Art. I § 8

Ramah Navajo School Board, Inc. v. Bureau of Revenue of New Mexico, 458 U.S. 832 (1982), is a United States Supreme Court case in which the Court held that the state was not authorized to impose taxes on a construction company building a school on a Native American (Indian) reservation.

The board operates Pine Hill Schools.

== Background ==
The children of Ramah Navajo Chapter of the Navajo Nation in New Mexico attended a public high school that was near the Navajo Reservation until the state closed the school in 1968. No other public schools were nearby, and children either did not attend high school or had to go to a federal Indian boarding school, none of which were close to the reservation. The New Mexico Taxation and Revenue Department assessed taxes on the construction company who built the school.

== See also ==
- Mescalero Apache Tribe v. Jones (1973)
- List of United States Supreme Court cases, volume 458
