= Menominee Tribe of Wisconsin v. United States =

- Supreme Court of the United States

Argued December 1, 2015 Decided January 25, 2016
- Full case name: Menominee Indian Tribe of Wisconsin, Petitioner v. United States
- Docket no.: 14–510
- Citations: 577 U.S. 250 (more) 136 S. Ct. 750; 193 L. Ed. 2d 652

Case history
- Prior: Summary judgment granted, 841 F. Supp. 2d 99 (D.D.C. 2012); affirmed, 764 F.3d 51 (D.C. Cir. 2014); cert. granted, 135 S. Ct. 2927 (2015).

Holding
- Plaintiff was not entitled to equitable tolling because they did not demonstrate "extraordinary circumstances"

Court membership
- Chief Justice John Roberts Associate Justices Antonin Scalia · Anthony Kennedy; Clarence Thomas · Ruth Bader Ginsburg; Stephen Breyer · Samuel Alito; Sonia Sotomayor · Elena Kagan

Case opinion
- Majority: Alito, joined by unanimous

Laws applied
- Contract Disputes Act of 1978, 41 U.S.C. § 7101 et seq.,

Menominee Tribe of Wisconsin v. United States, 577 U.S. 250 (2016), was a case in which the Supreme Court of the United States clarified when litigants are entitled to equitable tolling of a statute of limitations. In a unanimous opinion written by Justice Samuel Alito, the Court held that the plaintiff in this case was not entitled to equitable tolling of the statute of limitations because they did not demonstrate that "extraordinary circumstances" prevented the timely filing of the lawsuit.

== Background ==
This case began as a contract dispute between the Menominee Tribe of Wisconsin and the federal government where the tribe alleged that the federal government failed to adequately fund aid programs under the Indian Self-Determination and Education Assistance Act of 1975. The federal government argued that the Tribe should not have been allowed to bring their claims because they were not filed within the Contract Disputes Act's six-year statute of limitations. The Tribe, on the other hand, argued that the statute of limitations should be equitably tolled because a similar class action suit was pending for 707 days before the Tribe filed suit. The United States District Court for the District of Columbia ruled that the Tribe was not entitled to equitable tolling because they did not demonstrate "extraordinary circumstances", which are a prerequisite for a claim for equitable tolling. On appeal, the United States Court of Appeals for the District of Columbia Circuit affirmed the district court's ruling, and the Supreme Court of the United States ultimately granted certiorari to resolve a circuit split about the circumstances under which litigants are entitled to equitable tolling. (Note: The Supreme Court noted that the District of Columbia Circuit's opinion created a split with the United States Court of Appeals for the Federal Circuit, which permitted equitable tolling "under similar circumstances" in Arctic Slope Native Assn., Ltd. v. Sebelius, which was another "tribal entity equitable tolling" case.)

== Opinion of the Court ==
In a unanimous opinion written by Justice Samuel Alito, the Court held that the tribe was not entitled to equitable tolling of the statute of limitations. Citing Holland v. Florida, Justice Alito reaffirmed that litigants are only entitled to equitable tolling if they diligently pursue their claims and that "extraordinary circumstances" prevented timely filing. Citing Pace v. DiGuglielmo, Justice Alito also reaffirmed that these two factors are "elements" that should be considered together, and that they are "not merely factors of indeterminate or commensurable weight." Justice Alito held that the tribe did not demonstrate extraordinary circumstances in this case, and was therefore not entitled to equitable tolling.

== Commentary and analysis ==
In his review of the case for SCOTUSblog, Ronald Mann observed that "the case is likely to cast a shadow over equitable tolling cases for years to come" and suggested that "[f]uture Indian tribes with similar problems may well wish that the tribe in this case had accepted its defeat at the court of appeals without pushing for such a stern limitation on the doctrine from the Supreme Court itself."

== See also ==
- Menominee Tribe v. United States
- List of United States Supreme Court cases
- Lists of United States Supreme Court cases by volume
- List of United States Supreme Court cases by the Roberts Court
