= Dollar General Corp. v. Mississippi Band of Choctaw Indians =

- Supreme Court of the United States

Argued Dec. 7, 2015 Decided June 23, 2016
- Full case name: Dollar General Corp. and Dolgencorp LLC v. the Mississippi Band of Choctaw Indians; the Tribal Court of the Mississippi Band of Choctaw Indians; Christopher A. Collins, in his Official Capacity; John Doe, a minor, by and through his parents and next friends, John Doe, Sr. and Jane Doe
- Docket no.: 13-1496
- Citations: 579 U.S. 545 (more) 136 S. Ct. 2159; 195 L. Ed. 2d 637
- Argument: Oral argument
- Opinion announcement: Opinion announcement

Case history
- Prior: Dolgencorp, Inc. v. Mississippi Band of Choctaw Indians, 846 F. Supp. 2d 646 (S.D. Miss. 2011); affirmed, 746 F.3d 167 (5th Cir. 2014); cert. granted, 135 S. Ct. 2833 (2015).

Holding
- Affirmed by an equally divided Court

Court membership
- Chief Justice John Roberts Associate Justices Anthony Kennedy · Clarence Thomas; Ruth Bader Ginsburg · Stephen Breyer; Samuel Alito · Sonia Sotomayor; Elena Kagan

Case opinion
- Per curiam

Dollar General Corp. v. Mississippi Band of Choctaw Indians, 579 U.S. 545 (2016), was a United States Supreme Court case in which the Court was asked to determine if an American Indian tribal court had the jurisdiction to hear a civil case involving a non-Indian who operated a Dollar General store on tribal land under a consensual relationship with the tribe. The Court was equally divided, 4–4, and thereby affirmed the decision of the lower court, in this case the United States Court of Appeals for the Fifth Circuit, that the court had jurisdiction.

== Background ==
The Mississippi Band of Choctaw Indians, unlike many tribes, does not have a central reservation, but instead consists of eight tribal communities in Mississippi. Those communities are on land held in trust by the U.S. Government for the benefit of the tribe.

Beginning in 2000, Dollar General has had a lease from the tribe to operate a store on tribal land, and obtained a business license from the tribe. In 2003, a 13-year-old tribal member, identified as John Doe in court documents, was working at the store as part of a joint tribal-Dollar General internship program. (Note: There was no written agreement between Dollar General and the tribe, and Dollar General contended that the manager did not have the authority to participate.) Doe alleged that the store manager sexually abused him in 2003 causing "severe mental trauma". The tribe took action to legally exclude the manager from tribal lands, but the United States Attorney did not criminally prosecute him.

=== Tribal and District Courts ===
In 2005, Doe sued the store manager and Dollar General in the tribal court. (Note: The plaintiffs sought actual and punitive damages in the amount of $2.5 million.) The defendants tried to get the case dismissed, claiming that the tribal court did not have subject matter jurisdiction over non-Indians. The tribal court refused to dismiss the lawsuit, and the Choctaw Supreme Court affirmed, noting the case of Montana v. United States allowed tribes to exercise civil, as opposed to criminal, jurisdiction (Note: The Supreme Court prohibited tribes from exercising criminal jurisdiction over non-Indians in Oliphant v. Suquamish Indian Tribe in 1978.) over non-Indians on tribal land when the non-Indians had entered into a voluntary relationship with the tribe.

The store manager and Dollar General then sued the Tribe in the United States District Court for the Southern District of Mississippi, seeking to stop the suit in tribal court. The manager was dropped from the case by the district court but Dollar General was held to have been in a consensual relationship and subject to the tribe's jurisdiction.

=== Court of Appeals ===
The defendants then appealed to the Fifth Circuit, which affirmed the decision of the district court. The case was heard by a three-judge panel consisting of Judges Jerry Edwin Smith, Catharina Haynes, and James E. Graves Jr. Judge Graves delivered the opinion of the Court, finding that the facts in the case met the first exception noted in Montana, allowing the tribal court to exercise jurisdiction of Dollar General.

== Supreme Court ==
=== Arguments ===
Dollar General then appealed to the U.S. Supreme Court, asking the court to determine if Indian tribes had the power to hear tort cases against non-Indians who were involved in a consensual relationship with the tribe. They argue that the power that tribes may have once had to adjudicate matters involving non-Indians had been stripped away, and that it would take action by Congress or the unambiguous consent of the non-Indian to confer such jurisdiction. Dollar General urged the Court to make a ruling on civil jurisdiction that was similar to the ruling it made on criminal jurisdiction, in Oliphant v. Suquamish Indian Tribe.

The Choctaw tribe argued that it had inherent tribal sovereignty until Congress expressly removed the tribe's authority. The tribe stated that this issue had been decided by Montana and that the only issue was the consent of Dollar General.

The Solicitor General supported the Choctaw position and urged the Court not to accept the case. He further argued that the decision of the Fifth Circuit was proper.

=== Opinion ===
The per curiam opinion of the Court was announced by Chief Justice John Roberts on June 23, 2016. The text of the opinion stated "The judgment is affirmed by an equally divided Court." The death of Justice Antonin Scalia in February had left the Court with eight members, and cases which are equally divided result in the lower case ruling standing, but without precedent being established. It is as if the Court had never heard the case.
