= In re Kansas Indians =

- Supreme Court of the United States

Argued April 2, 1867 Decided May 6, 1867
- Full case name: The Kansas Indians
- Citations: 72 U.S. 737 (more) 5 Wall. 737; 18 L. Ed. 667

Case history
- Prior: Blue-Jacket v. Johnson County Com'rs, 3 Kan. 299 (1865); Miami County Com'rs v. Wan-zop-pe-che, 3 Kan. 364 (1865)

Holding
- The state of Kansas was not authorized to levy taxes on, and seize for forfeiture, lands which are set aside for Indian tribes by the United States government, under treaty or otherwise.

Court membership
- Chief Justice Salmon P. Chase Associate Justices James M. Wayne · Samuel Nelson; Robert C. Grier · Nathan Clifford; Noah H. Swayne · Samuel F. Miller; David Davis · Stephen J. Field

Case opinion
- Majority: Davis, joined by unanimous
- Superseded by
- Statute, as stated in Ariz. v. San Carlos Apache Tribe, 463 U.S. 545 (1983)

In re Kansas Indians, 72 U.S. (5 Wall.) 737 (1867), was a United States Supreme Court case in which the Court held that the state of Kansas was not authorized to levy taxes on, and seize for forfeiture, lands which are set aside for Indian tribes by the United States government, under treaty or otherwise.

== Background ==
The Kansas Indians case developed from three separate cases. Both Kansas and New York tried to tax the land of individual Indians. The Shawnee tribe moved to Kansas from Ohio and Missouri from 1825 to 1831, and were not to be considered part of the land of any state. In 1854, the tribe partitioned the land among its members, with the restriction that the land could not be sold without the permission of the United States. The Wea tribe was in a similar position, as was the Miami tribe.

In all three cases, the local counties levied property taxes on land belonging to members of the tribe, and the tribes objected. The Kansas Supreme Court heard two of the cases, and ruled that the taxes were proper as the Indians held fee simple title to the land.

== Supreme Court ==
Justice David Davis delivered the opinion of the Court. The Court held that a state could not levy taxes on the property of a tribe while the tribe was recognized by the United States.
