= Plains Commerce Bank v. Long Family Land & Cattle Co. =

Plains Commerce Bank v. Long Family Land and Cattle Co., Inc.
- Supreme Court of the United States

Argued April 14, 2008 Decided June 25, 2008
- Full case name: Plains Commerce Bank v. Long Family Land and Cattle Co., Inc.
- Docket no.: 07-0411
- Citations: 554 U.S. 316 (more) 128 S. Ct. 2709; 171 L. Ed. 2d 457; 2008 U.S. LEXIS 5261

Case history
- Prior: Summary judgment granted to plaintiffs, 440 F. Supp. 2d 1070 (D.S.D. 2006); aff'd, 491 F. 3d 878 (8th Cir. 2007); cert. granted, 552 U.S. 1087 (2008)

Holding
- A tribal court had no jurisdiction to hear a case on the sale of non-Indian fee land located on a reservation.

Court membership
- Chief Justice John Roberts Associate Justices John P. Stevens · Antonin Scalia; Anthony Kennedy · David Souter; Clarence Thomas · Ruth Bader Ginsburg; Stephen Breyer · Samuel Alito

Case opinions
- Majority: Roberts, joined by Scalia, Kennedy, Thomas, Alito; Stevens, Souter, Ginsburg, Breyer (Part II)
- Concur/dissent: Ginsburg, joined by Stevens, Souter, Breyer

Laws applied
- 25 U.S.C. § 331, et seq.

Plains Commerce Bank v. Long Family Land and Cattle Co., Inc., 554 U.S. 316 (2008), is a decision by the Supreme Court of the United States holding that a tribal court had no jurisdiction to hear a case for discrimination against an Indian in the sale of non-Indian fee land located on a reservation.

== Background ==
=== History ===
Ronnie and Lila Long had a family run ranching operation located on the Cheyenne River Indian Reservation, and both were enrolled members of the Cheyenne River Sioux Indian Tribe. The Longs have had a series of business dealings with the Plains Commerce Bank, which was a non-Indian corporation located off of the reservation. Ronnie Long's father Kenneth Long, a non-Indian, had mortgaged a portion of the ranch to the bank and owed approximately $750,000 at the time of his death in 1995. Following a series of negotiations, the Longs deeded over 2,230 acres (9.0 km^{2}) to the bank, which was then leased back to them, and were given a loan with an option to purchase the land at the end of the term. The bank had also agreed to provide loans for operating expenses, but failed to do so.

=== Tribal Court Actions ===
Following a bad winter in which the Longs lost 500 head of cattle and were unable to pay the loan, the bank started eviction proceedings. The bank then sold the land in two parcels to non-Indians and the Longs sought an injunction in the Tribal Court to stop the eviction and reverse the sale. They also claimed that the bank had discriminated against them based on their tribal membership. The bank asserted that the Tribal Court lacked jurisdiction. The Tribal Court found that it had jurisdiction and found for the Longs. The bank then appealed to the Cheyenne Sioux Tribal Court of Appeals, which affirmed the tribal court's decision.

=== Federal Court Actions ===
The bank then filed an action in the U.S. District Court for the District of South Dakota, Central Division. The District Court held that the Tribal Court had jurisdiction. The bank then appealed to the Eighth Circuit Court of Appeals, which affirmed the District Court ruling. The U.S. Supreme Court then granted certiorari to hear the case.

== Opinion of the Court ==
=== Majority ===
Chief Justice Roberts delivered the 5-4 majority opinion of the Court. Roberts first looked at the Longs' claim that the bank did not have standing to raise the jurisdictional issue for the first time at the Supreme Court level. In most cases, appellants are prohibited from raising an issue at appeal that they have not raised in a lower court. Roberts stated that the court had an independent duty to look at standing and held that the bank did in fact have standing to bring the matter before the court. All of the justices concurred on this part of the opinion.

Roberts then held that the Tribal Court did not have jurisdiction to hear the case, and that the tribe did not have the power to regulate land sales of non-Indian fee land located within the reservation. In earlier cases, the Supreme Court had held in Montana v. United States, 450 U.S. 544 (1981) that a tribe could regulate the actions of non-Indians on the reservation, and this formed the basis of the lower courts decisions. Roberts chose to distinguish the present case from Montana by focusing on the land sale instead of the alleged discriminatory conduct by the bank. Since the tribe lacked the authority to regulate the sale, Roberts held that the Tribal Court lacked jurisdiction.

=== Concurring in Part and Dissenting in Part ===
Justice Ginsburg concurred in part and dissented in part. Ginsburg concurred in the part of the majority opinion that held that the bank had standing to bring the case. She dissented from the part of the opinion that distinguished the current case from Montana, stating that while the Tribal Court did not have the authority to regulate the bank's sale, the court did have the authority to hear a case involving discriminatory conduct by the bank. She would have affirmed the decision of the lower court.
