= United States v. McBratney =

- Supreme Court of the United States
- Full case name: United States v. McBratney
- Citations: 104 U.S. 621 (more) 14 Otto 621; 26 L. Ed. 869

Case history
- Prior: Certificate of division from Circuit Court

Holding
- Upon the admission of Colorado as a state, there being no reservation to the United States of jurisdiction over the Indian territory within the state limits, that the United States circuit court for the district of Colorado had no jurisdiction over the murder of one white man by another in the Ute reservation in said state

Case opinion
- Majority: Gray, joined by unanimous

United States v. McBratney, 104 U.S. 621 (1881), was a United States Supreme Court case in which the Court held that upon the admission of Colorado as a state, there being no reservation to the United States of jurisdiction over the Indian territory within the state limits, that the United States circuit court for the district of Colorado had no jurisdiction over the murder of one white man by another in the Ute reservation in said state.

== Background ==
McBratney was convicted of the murder of Thomas Casey on the Ute Reservation in Colorado. Following conviction, McBratney appealed claiming that the federal courts did not have jurisdiction to try a white man for the murder of another white man on an Indian reservation. On appeal, the circuit court could not come to an agreement and issued a certificate of division.

== Supreme Court ==
Justice Horace Gray delivered the opinion of the court. Gray stated that although the treaty with the Utes provided for federal jurisdiction, the act of Congress creating the state of Colorado did not reserve federal jurisdiction over Indian reservations. He noted that in the past, Congress had explicitly reserved such lands and jurisdiction, as in the case of Kansas. The federal court would still have jurisdiction for crimes committed against Indians by whites, or vice versa, but the state otherwise had jurisdiction.

== Subsequent developments ==
Since the decision, every state that has been admitted, with the exception of Hawaii, has been required to acknowledge federal jurisdiction over reservation lands.
