= Oklahoma Tax Commission v. Citizen Band, Potawatomi Indian Tribe of Oklahoma =

Okla. Tax Commission v. Citizen Band, Potawatomi Indian Tribe of Okla.
- Supreme Court of the United States

Argued January 7, 1991 Decided February 26, 1991
- Full case name: Oklahoma Tax Commission v. Citizen Band, Potawatomi Indian Tribe of Oklahoma
- Citations: 498 U.S. 505 (more) 111 S. Ct. 905; 112 L. Ed. 2d 1112; 1991 U.S. LEXIS 1298

Case history
- Prior: 888 F.2d 1303 (10th Cir. 1989); cert. granted, 498 U.S. 806 (1990).
- Subsequent: Remanded, 932 F.2d 1355 (10th Cir. 1991); judgment affirmed, 969 F.2d 943 (10th Cir. 1992).

Holding
- The tribe was not subject to state sales taxes on sales made to tribal members, but that they were liable for taxes on sales to non-tribal members.

Court membership
- Chief Justice William Rehnquist Associate Justices Byron White · Thurgood Marshall; Harry Blackmun · John P. Stevens; Sandra Day O'Connor · Antonin Scalia; Anthony Kennedy · David Souter

Case opinions
- Majority: Rehnquist, joined by unanimous
- Concurrence: Stevens

Laws applied
- Tribal sovereign immunity

Okla. Tax Commission v. Citizen Band, Potawatomi Indian Tribe of Okla., 498 U.S. 505 (1991), was a case in which the Supreme Court of the United States held that the tribe was not subject to state sales taxes on sales made to tribal members, but that they were liable for taxes on sales to non-tribal members.

== Background ==
The Potawatomi was originally from the Wabash River area of Indiana and was known as the Mission Band of Potawatomi. After 1833, they were relocated to Kansas, where they lost most of their land due to the allotment system. In 1867, in a treaty with Kansas, the tribe sold their land in that state in order to purchase land in the Indian Territory (now Oklahoma) and took United States citizenship. They have henceforth been known as the Citizen Potawatomi Nation.

=== District Court decision ===
The tribe, for many years has sold cigarettes on tribal lands without collecting Oklahoma's cigarette tax. In 1987, the Oklahoma Tax Commission demanded that the tribe pay $2.7 million for taxes due from 1982 to 1986. The tribe sued in the U.S. District Court. The District Court denied the tribe's motion for summary judgment and following a trial, held that the tribe's sales to tribal members was immune from state taxation, but that sales to non-tribal members could be taxed.

=== Circuit Court decision ===
The tribe appealed, asserting that they enjoyed total tribal sovereign immunity for sales on tribal lands. The State of Oklahoma stated that the tribe had waived its immunity by filing the case in the district court. The Tenth Circuit Court of Appeals held that Oklahoma lacked the authority to collect any state sales taxes on tribal lands, whether to tribal members or non-tribal members. Oklahoma appealed and the Supreme Court granted certiorari.

== Opinion of the Court ==
Affirmed in part, reversed in part. Chief Justice Rehnquist delivered the opinion for a unanimous court.

Rehnquist first stated that the tribe does not waive immunity by instituting an action in the district court, noting that the court had previously determined that tribes were immune from counter-claims or cross-suits, absent Congressional authorization to the contrary. He next addressed the state's argument that tribal land held in trust was not the same as reservation land, and found the state's position unpersuasive. Tribal land, whether held in trust or as part of a reservation, is set apart for the use of the tribe, and as such qualifies for immunity. The court then held that the Tenth Circuit erred in holding that tribe did not have to collect sales taxes on cigarettes sold to non-members.

=== Concurring Opinion ===
Justice Stevens issued a concurring opinion that mainly discussed the question of immunity as applied to the facts of the case.
