= Outline of United States federal Indian law and policy =

The following outline is provided as an overview of and topical guide to United States federal Indian law and policy:

Federal Indian policy – establishes the relationship between the United States Government and the Indian Tribes within its borders. The Constitution gives the federal government primary responsibility for dealing with tribes. Law and U.S. public policy related to Native Americans have evolved continuously since the founding of the United States. David R. Wrone argues that the failure of the treaty system was because of the inability of an individualistic, democratic society to recognize group rights or the value of an organic, corporatist culture represented by the tribes.

== U.S. Supreme Court cases ==

List of United States Supreme Court cases involving Indian tribes

=== Citizenship ===
==== Adoption ====
- Mississippi Band of Choctaw Indians v. Holyfield, 490 U.S. 30 (1989)
- Adoptive Couple v. Baby Girl, 530 U.S. _ (2013)

==== Tribal ====
- Ex parte Joins, 191 U.S. 93 (1903)
- Santa Clara Pueblo v. Martinez, 436 U.S. 49 (1978)
- Mississippi Band of Choctaw Indians v. Holyfield, 490 U.S. 30 (1989)
- South Dakota v. Bourland, 508 U.S. 679 (1993)

=== Civil rights ===
- Oliphant v. Suquamish Indian Tribe, 435 U.S. 191 (1978)
- United States v. Wheeler, 435 U.S. 313 (1978)

=== Congressional authority ===
- Ex parte Joins, 191 U.S. 93 (1903)
- White Mountain Apache Tribe v. Bracker, 448 U.S. 136 (1980)
- California v. Cabazon Band of Mission Indians, 480 U.S. 202 (1987)
- South Dakota v. Bourland, 508 U.S. 679 (1993)
- United States v. Lara, 541 U.S. 193 (2004)

=== Gambling ===
- California v. Cabazon Band of Mission Indians, 480 U.S. 202 (1987)

=== Hunting and fishing rights ===
- Menominee Tribe v. United States, 391 U.S. 404 (1968)
- New Mexico v. Mescalero Apache Tribe, 462 U.S. 324 (1983)
- Oregon Dept. of Fish and Wildlife v. Klamath Indian Tribe, 473 U.S. 753 (1985)
- Brendale v. Confederated Yakima Indian Nation, 492 U.S. 408 (1989)
- South Dakota v. Bourland, 508 U.S. 679 (1993)

=== Jurisdiction ===
- Iowa Mutual Insurance Co. v. LaPlante, 480 U.S. 9 (1987)
- California v. Cabazon Band of Mission Indians, 480 U.S. 202 (1987)
- Mississippi Band of Choctaw Indians v. Holyfield, 490 U.S. 30 (1989)
- South Dakota v. Bourland, 508 U.S. 679 (1993)
- Adoptive Couple v. Baby Girl, 530 U.S. _ (2013)

==== Criminal ====
- Ex parte Crow Dog, 109 U.S. 556 (1883)
- United States v. Wheeler, 435 U.S. 313 (1978)
- Duro v. Reina, 495 U.S. 676 (1990)
- United States v. Lara, 541 U.S. 193 (2004)

==== Federal ====
- United States v. Rogers, 45 U.S. (4 How.) 567 (1846)
- Ex parte Crow Dog, 109 U.S. 556 (1883)
- National Farmers Union Ins. Cos. v. Crow Tribe, 468 U.S. 1315 (1984)
- United States v. Lara, 541 U.S. 193 (2004)

==== Over non-Indians ====
- Oliphant v. Suquamish Indian Tribe, 435 U.S. 191 (1978)
- New Mexico v. Mescalero Apache Tribe, 462 U.S. 324 (1983)
- National Farmers Union Ins. Cos. v. Crow Tribe, 468 U.S. 1315 (1984)
- Iowa Mutual Insurance Co. v. LaPlante, 480 U.S. 9 (1987)
- California v. Cabazon Band of Mission Indians, 480 U.S. 202 (1987)
- Duro v. Reina, 495 U.S. 676 (1990)
- Plains Commerce Bank v. Long Family Land and Cattle Co., Inc., ___ U.S. ___, 128 S.Ct. 2709 (2008)

==== State ====
- Washington v. Confederated Bands and Tribes of the Yakima Indian Nation, 439 U.S. 463 (1979)
- White Mountain Apache Tribe v. Bracker, 448 U.S. 136 (1980)
- Rice v. Rehner, 463 U.S. 713 (1983)
- Three Affiliated Tribes of Fort Berthold Reservation v. Wold Engineering, P. C., 467 U.S. 138 (1984)
- Iowa Mutual Insurance Co. v. LaPlante, 480 U.S. 9 (1987)
- California v. Cabazon Band of Mission Indians, 480 U.S. 202 (1987)

=== Liquor ===
- Rice v. Rehner, 463 U.S. 713 (1983)

=== Property rights ===
- Oklahoma Tax Commission v. United States, 319 U.S. 598 (1943)
- United States v. Southern Ute Tribe or Band of Indians, 402 U.S. 159 (1971)
- United States v. Sioux Nation of Indians, 448 U.S. 371 (1980)
- Rice v. Rehner, 463 U.S. 713 (1983)
- Brendale v. Confederated Yakima Indian Nation, 492 U.S. 408 (1989)
- Oklahoma Tax Comm'n v. Citizen Band of Potawatomi Tribe of Okla., 498 U.S. 505 (1991)
- Yakima v. Confederated Tribes, 502 U.S. 251 (1992)
- South Dakota v. Bourland, 508 U.S. 679 (1993)
- Plains Commerce Bank v. Long Family Land and Cattle Co., Inc., ___ U.S. ___, 128 S.Ct. 2709 (2008)

==== Allotment ====
- Arenas v. United States, 322 U.S. 419 (1944)
- Brendale v. Confederated Yakima Indian Nation, 492 U.S. 408 (1989)
- Yakima v. Confederated Tribes, 502 U.S. 251 (1992)
- Plains Commerce Bank v. Long Family Land and Cattle Co., Inc., ___ U.S. ___, 128 S.Ct. 2709 (2008)
- United States v. Mitchell (1983), 463 U.S. 206 (1983)

==== Mineral rights ====
- Merrion v. Jicarilla Apache Tribe, 455 U.S. 130 (1982)

=== Reservations ===
- United States v. Southern Ute Tribe or Band of Indians, 402 U.S. 159 (1971)
- McClanahan v. Arizona State Tax Comm'n, 411 U.S. 164 (1973)
- Oliphant v. Suquamish Indian Tribe, 435 U.S. 191 (1978)
- Washington v. Confederated Bands and Tribes of the Yakima Indian Nation, 439 U.S. 463 (1979)
- Washington v. Confederated Tribes of Colville Reservation, 447 U.S. 134 (1980)
- White Mountain Apache Tribe v. Bracker, 448 U.S. 136 (1980)
- United States v. Sioux Nation of Indians, 448 U.S. 371 (1980)
- Merrion v. Jicarilla Apache Tribe, 455 U.S. 130 (1982)
- New Mexico v. Mescalero Apache Tribe, 462 U.S. 324 (1983)
- Rice v. Rehner, 463 U.S. 713 (1983)
- Oregon Dept. of Fish and Wildlife v. Klamath Indian Tribe, 473 U.S. 753 (1985)
- California v. Cabazon Band of Mission Indians, 480 U.S. 202 (1987)
- Mississippi Band of Choctaw Indians v. Holyfield, 490 U.S. 30 (1989)
- Brendale v. Confederated Yakima Indian Nation, 492 U.S. 408 (1989)
- Oklahoma Tax Comm'n v. Citizen Band of Potawatomi Tribe of Okla., 498 U.S. 505 (1991)
- South Dakota v. Bourland, 508 U.S. 679 (1993)
- Plains Commerce Bank v. Long Family Land and Cattle Co., Inc., ___ U.S. ___, 128 S.Ct. 2709 (2008)

=== Statutory and treaty interpretation ===
- Ex parte Crow Dog, 109 U.S. 556 (1883)
- Menominee Tribe v. United States, 391 U.S. 404 (1968)
- Bryan v. Itasca County, 426 U.S. 373 (1976)
- Washington v. Confederated Bands and Tribes of the Yakima Indian Nation, 439 U.S. 463 (1979)
- Oregon Dept. of Fish and Wildlife v. Klamath Indian Tribe, 473 U.S. 753 (1985)
- South Dakota v. Bourland, 508 U.S. 679 (1993)

=== Taxation ===
==== State ====
- Oklahoma Tax Commission v. United States, 319 U.S. 598 (1943)
- Mescalero Apache Tribe v. Jones, 411 U.S. 145 (1973)
- McClanahan v. Arizona State Tax Comm'n, 411 U.S. 164 (1973)
- Bryan v. Itasca County, 426 U.S. 373 (1976)
- Washington v. Confederated Tribes of Colville Reservation, 447 U.S. 134 (1980)
- White Mountain Apache Tribe v. Bracker, 448 U.S. 136 (1980)
- Ramah Navajo School Bd., Inc. v. Bureau of Revenue of N.M., 458 U.S. 832 (1982)
- New Mexico v. Mescalero Apache Tribe, 462 U.S. 324 (1983)
- Cotton Petroleum Corp. v. New Mexico, 490 U.S. 163 (1989)
- Oklahoma Tax Comm'n v. Citizen Band of Potawatomi Tribe of Okla., 498 U.S. 505 (1991)
- Yakima v. Confederated Tribes, 502 U.S. 251 (1992)
- Oklahoma Tax Commission v. Sac & Fox Nation, 508 U.S. 115 (1993)
- Dept. of Taxation and Finance of N.Y. v. Milhelm Attea & Bros., Inc., 512 U.S. 61 (1994)
- Wagnon v. Prairie Band Potawatomi Indians, 546 U.S. 95 (2005)

==== Tribal ====
- Merrion v. Jicarilla Apache Tribe, 455 U.S. 130 (1982)

=== Tribal sovereignty ===
- Cherokee Nation v. Georgia, 30 U.S. 1 (1831)
- Worcester v. Georgia, 31 U.S. 515 (1832)
- United States v. Kagama, 118 U.S. 375 (1886)
- Oklahoma Tax Commission v. United States, 319 U.S. 598 (1943)
- Menominee Tribe v. United States, 391 U.S. 404 (1968)
- Morton v. Mancari, 417 U.S. 535 (1974)
- Bryan v. Itasca County, 426 U.S. 373 (1976)
- Oliphant v. Suquamish Indian Tribe, 435 U.S. 191 (1978)
- United States v. Wheeler, 435 U.S. 313 (1978)
- Santa Clara Pueblo v. Martinez, 436 U.S. 49 (1978)
- Washington v. Confederated Bands and Tribes of the Yakima Indian Nation, 439 U.S. 463 (1979)
- Washington v. Confederated Tribes of Colville Reservation, 447 U.S. 134 (1980)
- White Mountain Apache Tribe v. Bracker, 448 U.S. 136 (1980)
- Merrion v. Jicarilla Apache Tribe, 455 U.S. 130 (1982)
- Ramah Navajo School Bd., Inc. v. Bureau of Revenue of N.M., 458 U.S. 832 (1982)
- New Mexico v. Mescalero Apache Tribe, 462 U.S. 324 (1983)
- National Farmers Union Ins. Cos. v. Crow Tribe, 468 U.S. 1315 (1984)
- Three Affiliated Tribes of Fort Berthold Reservation v. Wold Engineering, P. C., 467 U.S. 138 (1984)
- Cotton Petroleum Corp. v. New Mexico, 490 U.S. 163 (1989)
- Brendale v. Confederated Yakima Indian Nation, 492 U.S. 408 (1989)
- Duro v. Reina, 495 U.S. 676 (1990)
- Oklahoma Tax Comm'n v. Citizen Band of Potawatomi Tribe of Okla., 498 U.S. 505 (1991)
- Yakima v. Confederated Tribes, 502 U.S. 251 (1992)
- Dept. of Taxation and Finance of N.Y. v. Milhelm Attea & Bros., Inc., 512 U.S. 61 (1994)
- United States v. Lara, 541 U.S. 193 (2004)
- Wagnon v. Prairie Band Potawatomi Indians, 546 U.S. 95 (2005)
- Plains Commerce Bank v. Long Family Land and Cattle Co., Inc., ___ U.S. ___, 128 S.Ct. 2709 (2008)

== Other federal court cases ==
- In the Matter of S--- (1942)
- Sohappy v. Smith (1969)
- Joint Tribal Council of the Passamaquoddy Tribe v. Morton (1975)
- Cobell v. Salazar (1996, 2009)
- Harjo et al v. Pro Football, Inc. (2005)

== Legislation ==
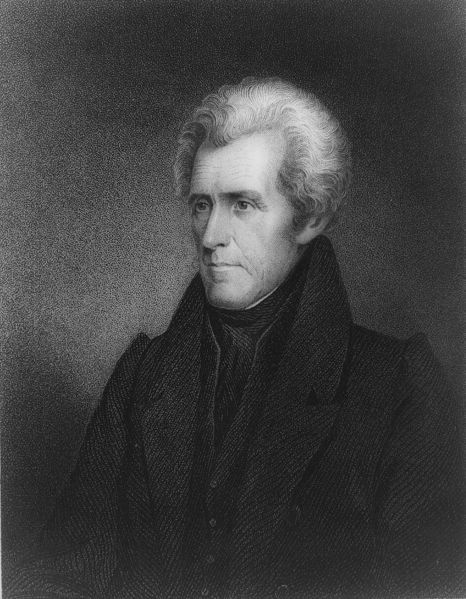
President Andrew Jackson called for an Indian Removal Act in his 1829 speech on the issue.

- Alaska Native Allotment Act
- Alaska Native Claims Settlement Act
- Aleut Restitution Act of 1988
- American Indian Religious Freedom Act
- American Indian Trust Fund Management Reform Act 1994
- Burke Act
- Indian Citizenship Act of 1924
- Civilization Fund Act
- Curtis Act of 1898
- Dawes Act
- Indian Gaming Regulatory Act
- Native American Graves Protection and Repatriation Act
- Hawaiian Homelands
- House concurrent resolution 108
- Indian Arts and Crafts Act of 1990
- Indian Child Welfare Act
- Indian Claims Limitations Act
- Indian Land Claims Settlements
- Indian Land Consolidation Act
- Indian Relocation Act of 1956
- Indian Removal Act
- Indian Reorganization Act
- Indian Self-Determination and Education Assistance Act of 1975
- The Indian Vaccination Act of 1832
- Native American Languages Act of 1990
- Nonintercourse Act
- Johnson–O'Malley Act
- Lacey Act of 1907
- Major Crimes Act
- Menominee Restoration Act
- Meriam Report
- Mission Indian Act of 1891
- Native American Housing Assistance and Self-Determination Act of 1996
- Nelson Act of 1889
- Oklahoma Indian Welfare Act
- Public Law 280
- Title 25 of the United States Code
- Tribal Law and Order Act of 2010
- Western Shoshone Claims Distribution Act of 2004
- White Mountain Apache Tribe Water Rights Quantification Act of 2009

== Executive Orders ==
- Executive Order 13007, 1996, Indian Sacred Sites [Clinton]
- Executive Order 13021, 1996, Tribal Colleges and Universities [Clinton]
- Executive Order 13084, 1998, Consultation and Coordination with Indian Tribal Governments [Clinton]
- Executive Order 13096, 1998, American Indian and Alaska Native Education [Clinton]
- Executive Order 13107, 1998, Implementation of Human Rights Treaties [Clinton]
- Executive Order 13158, 2000, Marine Protected Areas [Clinton]
- Executive Order 13175, 2000, Consultation and Coordination with Indian Tribal Governments [Clinton]
- Executive Order 13270, 2002, Tribal College Endorsement [GW Bush]
- Executive Order 13336, 2004, American Indian and Alaska Native Education [GW Bush]

== Treaties ==
Indiana Indian treaties

The federal government was in charge of relations with the Indians, and the procedure was to use the treaty making power of the president and the Senate to make formal arrangements. Over 200 treaties were agreed upon by 1840. Gatlin argues that treaties established a procedure that benefited both parties. The federal government was primarily interested in guaranteeing that Indian lands did not fall into private hands, and that it handled all negotiations with the tribes. These negotiations, says Gatlin, strengthened the tribes sense of unity and leadership. The land sales gave the Indians a steady flow of income, and guarantees of federal financial, medical, and educational aid.

Many of the treaties remain in effect and are of special importance regarding federal recognition of tribal status, hunting and fishing rights, rights to protection of sacred properties, rights to water and minerals, and land claims. The federal courts have a long, continuous history of litigation on these issues. The Supreme Court endorsed the procedure, with over 300 decisions making reference to Indian treaties after 1799.

=== Major treaties ===
- Treaty of Brownstown, 1808, was between the United States and the Council of Three Fires (Chippewa, Ottawa, Potawatomi), Wyandott, and Shawanoese Indian Nations.
- Treaty of Buffalo Creek
- Treaty of Canandaigua, 1794, is a treaty signed after the American Revolutionary War between the Grand Council of the Six Nations and President George Washington representing the United States of America.
- Treaty of the Cedars
- Cherokee treaties
- 1821 Treaty of Chicago
- 1833 Treaty of Chicago
- Treaty of Colerain
- Treaty of the Creek Agency (1818)
- Treaty of Cusseta
- Treaty of Dancing Rabbit Creek
- Treaty of Detroit
- Treaty of Doak's Stand
- Treaty of Fond du Lac
- Treaty of Fort Adams
- Fort Bridger Treaty Council of 1868
- Treaty of Fort Clark
- Treaty of Fort Confederation
- Treaty of Fort Finney
- Treaty of Fort Industry
- Treaty of Fort Jackson
- Treaty of Fort Laramie (1851)
- Treaty of Fort Laramie (1868)
- Treaty of Fort Meigs
- Treaty of Fort Pitt
- Treaty of Fort St. Stephens
- Treaty of Fort Stanwix (1784)
- Treaty of Fort Wayne (1803)
- Treaty of Fort Wayne (1809)
- Treaty of Fort Wise
- Georgia resolutions 1827 were a response to the Cherokee's refusal to cede their territory within the U.S. state of Georgia.
- Treaty of Greenville
- Treaty of Greenville (1814)
- Treaty of Fort Harmar
- Treaty of Hellgate
- Treaty of Hoe Buckintoopa
- Treaty of Holston
- Treaty of Hopewell
- Treaty of Indian Springs (1825)
- Treaty of La Pointe, may refer to either of two treaties made and signed in La Pointe, Wisconsin between the United States and the Ojibwe (Chippewa) Native American peoples. In addition, the Isle Royale Agreement, an adhesion to the first Treaty of La Pointe, was made at La Pointe.
- Treaty of Lewistown
- List of Choctaw treaties
- Little Arkansas Treaty
- Fort Martin Scott Treaty
- Treaty of Fort McIntosh
- Treaty of Medicine Creek
- Medicine Lodge Treaty
- Treaty of Mendota
- Treaty of Moultrie Creek
- Treaty of Mount Dexter
- Native American treaties
- Treaty of New Echota
- Treaty of New York (1790), between the U.S. Government and the Creek Indians.
- Treaty of New York (1796), between New York State and the Seven Nations of Canada.
- Treaty of Old Crossing
- Osage Treaty (1825)
- Treaty of Payne's Landing
- Treaty of Point Elliott
- Treaties of Portage des Sioux
- List of treaties between the Potawatomi and the United States
- Treaty of St. Joseph
- First Treaty of Prairie du Chien
- Second Treaty of Prairie du Chien
- Third Treaty of Prairie du Chien
- Fourth Treaty of Prairie du Chien
- Quinault Treaty
- Treaty of Saginaw
- Treaty of St. Louis (1804)
- Treaty of St. Louis (1816)
- Treaty of St. Louis (1818)
- Treaty of St. Louis (1825)
- Treaty of St. Mary's
- Treaty of St. Peters
- Treaty of Sycamore Shoals
- Treaty of Tellico
- Treaty of Big Tree
- Treaty of Bird's Fort
- Treaty of Grouseland
- Treaty of Mississinewas
- Treaty of Tippecanoe
- Treaty of Traverse des Sioux
- Treaty of Vincennes
- Treaty of Washington City
- Treaty of Washington, with Menominee (1831)
- Treaty with the Kalapuya, etc.
- Walla Walla Council (1855)
- Treaty of Wapakoneta
- Treaty of Washington (1826)
- Treaty of Washington (1836)
- Treaty of Washington (1855)
- Treaty of Watertown, 1776, established a military alliance between the United States and the St. John's and Mi'kmaq First Nations in Nova Scotia against Great Britain during the American Revolutionary War.
- Yankton Treaty

== Notable people ==
The following individuals have played an important role in the evolution of Federal Indian Law and Policy through activism, literature and other methods.

- Hank Adams (Fort Peck Assiniboine-Sioux), Native American rights activist
- James Anaya is the American James J. Lenoir Professor of Human Rights Law and Policy at the University of Arizona's James E. Rogers College of Law.
- Clyde Bellecourt (White Earth Ojibwe), co-founder of American Indian Movement
- Vernon Bellecourt (White Earth Ojibwe), co-founder of American Indian Movement
- Mary Brave Bird (Brulé Lakota), author and activist
- Ed Castillo (Luiseño-Cahuilla), Native American activist who participated in the American Indian occupation of Alcatraz in 1969.
- Ward Churchill, American scholar, author, and political activist.
- Felix S. Cohen, American lawyer and scholar who made a lasting mark on legal philosophy and fundamentally shaped federal Indian law and policy.
- John Collier, American social reformer and Native American advocate.
- Lyda Conley (Wyandot, lawyer and the first woman admitted to the Kansas bar, who fought to retain tribal control of the Wyandot National Burying Ground
- Elizabeth Cook-Lynn (Crow Creek Lakota), editor, essayist, poet, novelist, and academic.
- Lucy Covington (Colville), activist for Native American emancipation.
- Mary Dann and Carrie Dann (Western Shoshone) were spiritual leaders, ranchers, and cultural, spiritual rights and land rights activists.
- Joe DeLaCruz (Quinault), Native American leader in Washington, U.S., president for 22 years of the Quinault Tribe of the Quinault Reservation.
- Vine Deloria, Jr. (Yankton Dakota-Standing Rock Nakota, 1993–2005) was an American Indian author, theologian, historian, and activist.
- Deskaheh (Cayuga, 1873–1925), Haudenosaunee statesman noted for his persistent efforts to get recognition for his people.
- John EchoHawk (Pawnee), Native American attorney, founder of the Native American Rights Fund, and a leading member of the Native American self-determination movement.
- Larry EchoHawk (Pawnee), head of the United States Bureau of Indian Affairs, Attorney General of Idaho from 1991 to 1995.
- Adam Fortunate Eagle (Red Lake Ojibwe), Native American activist and was the principal organizer of the 1969-71 occupation of Alcatraz Island by "Indians of All Tribes."
- Kalyn Free (Choctaw Nation of Oklahoma), American attorney and former political candidate
- Suzan Shown Harjo (Cheyenne–Hodulgee Muscogee) is a policy maker, author, legal activist for American Indian rights, and founder of the Morning Star Institute
- LaDonna Harris (Comanche), activist, founder of Americans for Indian Opportunity, and US vice-presidential candidate.
- Thomasina Jordan (Wampanoag Nation), fought for the federal recognition of Virginian Indian tribes and served as chairwoman of the Virginia Council on Indians.
- Ronnie Lupe (White Mountain Apache), chairman of the White Mountain Apache Tribe, land and water rights, endangered species, and tribal sovereignty activist
- Oren Lyons (Seneca-Onondaga), Faithkeeper of the Turtle Clan of the Haudenosaunee Confederacy, Traditional Circle of Indian Elders and Youth, negotiator with national-states on behalf of indigenous nations.
- Janet McCloud (Tulalip), cofounder of Women of All Red Nations (WARN) and Indigenous Women's Network, advocate for fishing and other treaty rights
- D'Arcy McNickle (Salish-Kootenai, 1904–1977), educational reformer, instrumental in drafting the "Declaration of Indian Purpose" for the 1961 American Indian Chicago Conference, co-founder of the National Congress of American Indians
- Wilma Mankiller (Cherokee Nation), community organizer, the first female Principal Chief of the Cherokee Nation.
- Tina Manning (Duck Valley Shoshone-Paiute, d. 1979), water rights activist and wife of John Trudell
- Russell Means (Oglala Lakota, b. 1939), member of AIM, actor
- Carlos Montezuma (Yavapai-Apache), founding member of the Society of American Indians and outspoken opponent of the BIA
- Richard Oakes (activist), Mohawk Native American activist who promoted the fundamental idea that Native peoples have a right to sovereignty, justice, respect and control over their own destinies.
- William Paul (attorney), American attorney, legislator, and political activist from the Tlingit nation of southeastern Alaska.
- Leonard Peltier, activist and member of the American Indian Movement (AIM).
- Simon Pokagon, member of the Pokagon Band of Potawatomi Indians, author, and Native American advocate.
- Robert Robideau, American Indian activist.
- Katherine Siva Saubel, Native American scholar, educator, tribal leader, author, and activist committed to preserving Cahuilla history, culture and language.
- Redbird Smith, Cherokee traditionalist and political activist.
- Standing Bear (Ponca, ca. 1834–1908), chief who successfully argued in US District Court case establishing the right of habeas corpus for Native Americans
- Ralph W. Sturges, American Mohegan tribal chief who helped gain federal recognition for the Mohegan people of Connecticut in 1994.
- JoAnn Tall (Oglala Lakota), environmental and anti-nuclear activist, co-founder of the Native Resource Coalition
- Melissa L. Tatum, Research Professor of Law and associate director of the Indigenous Peoples Law and Policy Program at the University of Arizona's James E. Rogers College of Law
- Charlene Teters (Spokane), artist, educator, editor, and founding boardmember of the National Coalition on Racism in Sports and the Media
- Mel Thom (Walker River Paiute), cofounder of National Indian Youth Council and president of the Southwest Regional Indian Youth Council
- Susette LaFlesche Tibbles (Omaha-Ponca-Iowa), author and international lecturer about Native American rights and reservation conditions.
- Thomas Tibbles, journalist and author from Omaha, Nebraska, who became an activist for Native American rights in the United States during the late 19th century and married Susette LaFlesche Tibbles.
- Catherine Troeh (Chinook), editor, co-founder of American Indian Women's Service League and only woman to serve on the Chinook Tribal Council
- John Trudell (Santee Dakota), author, poet, actor, musician, and former chairman of the American Indian Movement.
- Asiba Tupahache, Matinecoc Nation Native American activist from New York.
- Clyde Warrior, activist for Native American civil rights.
- Kevin K. Washburn, former federal prosecutor, a trial attorney at the U.S. Department of Justice, General Counsel of the National Indian Gaming Commission, and Assistant Secretary - Indian Affairs, at Interior, overseeing the Bureau of Indian Affairs.
- Charmaine White Face (Oglala Lakota), spokesperson for the Teton Sioux Nation Treaty Council and coordinator of the Defenders of the Black Hills, which works toward the Fort Laramie Treaties of 1851 and 1868 being enforced. She works in language preservation, land reclamation, and international indigenous human rights.
- Bernie Whitebear (Colville), American Indian activist, a co-founder of the Seattle Indian Health Board (SIHB), the United Indians of All Tribes Foundation, and the Daybreak Star Cultural Center.
- Robert A. Williams Jr., an American lawyer who is a notable author and legal scholar in the field of Federal Indian Law, International Law and Indigenous Peoples Rights, and Critical Race and Post Colonial Theory.
- Sarah Winnemucca (Northern Paiute, 1844–1891), author and lecturer who educated non-natives about conditions in Indian Country and founded a school for native children
- Zitkala-Sa (Gertrude Simmons Bonnin, Yankton Dakota, 1876–1938), political writer and educator, religious freedom activist

== Organizations ==

The following organizations have played an important role in the evolution of Federal Indian Law and Policy through activism, lobbying, government oversight and education.

=== Government ===
- Bureau of Indian Affairs
- Bureau of Indian Affairs Police
- Bureau of Indian Education
- Crow Agency, Montana
- Fort Peck Indian Agency
- Indian Peace Commission
- National Indian Gaming Commission
- United States House Natural Resources Subcommittee on Indian and Alaska Native Affairs
- United States Senate Committee on Indian Affairs
- United States Congress Joint Special Committee on Conditions of Indian Tribes

==== Agencies ====
- Rocky Mountain Region
  - Blackfeet Agency
  - Crow Agency
  - Fort Belknap Agency
  - Fort Peck Agency
  - Northern Cheyenne Agency
  - Rocky Boy's Agency
  - Wind River Agency

=== Nations ===
- Federally recognized tribes
- State-recognized tribes in the United States
- List of Alaska Native tribal entities

=== Native American advocacy groups and rights organizations ===
- Alaska Federation of Natives
- Alaska Native Brotherhood/Sisterhood
- American Indian College Fund
- American Indian Defense Association
- American Indian Higher Education Consortium
- American Indian Movement
- American Indian Philosophy Association
- Americans for Indian Opportunity
- Anishinaabe tribal political organizations
- Association on American Indian Affairs
- Cherokee Preservation Foundation
- Cheyenne military societies
- Great Lakes Indian Fish & Wildlife Commission
- Guilford Native American Association
- Indian Health Service
- Indian Rights Association
- Inter-Tribal Environmental Council
- Metrolina Native American Association
- National Congress of American Indians
- National Indian Education Association
- National Indian Youth Council
- Native American Fish and Wildlife Society
- Native American Rights Fund
- North American Indian Center of Boston
- Northern California Indian Development Council
- Original Keetoowah Society
- Phi Sigma Nu
- Algonquian Confederacy of the Quinnipiac Tribal Council
- Sequoyah Research Center
- Society of American Indians
- Tohono O'Odham Ki:Ki Association
- Traditional Circle of Indian Elders & Youth
- Tree of Peace Society
- Tribal College Librarians Institute
- United Indians of All Tribes
- White Earth Land Recovery Project
- Women's National Indian Association

== Events and issues ==
- Aboriginal title in the United States
- Blood quantum laws
- Certificate of Degree of Indian Blood
- Indian termination policy
- Native American self-determination
- Native American civil rights
- Native American Reservation Politics
- Secretarial Review
- Trail of Broken Treaties
- Tribal sovereignty in the United States

== Literature ==
- Canby, William C. Jr. (2009). American Indian Law in a Nutshell. Eagan, MN: West Publishing. ISBN 978-0-314-19519-7.
- Coggins, George; et al. (2007). Federal Public Land and Resource Law. New York: Foundation Press. ISBN 978-1-59941-163-7.
- Cohen, Felix S. (2005). Newton, Neil Jessup (ed.). Cohen's Handbook Federal Indian Law 2005 Edition. Newark, NJ: LexisNexis. ISBN 978-0-327-16444-9.
- Deloria, Vine Jr.; Clifford M. Lytle (1983). American Indians, American Justice. Austin, TX: University of Texas Press. ISBN 978-0-292-73834-8.
- Duthu, Bruce (2009). American Indians and the Law. New York pp. 91- 115: Penguin Books. ISBN 978-0-14-311478-9.
- Finkelman, Paul; Garrison, Tim Alan (2008). Encyclopedia of United States Indian Policy and Law. Thousand Oaks, CA: Sage Publications. ISBN 978-1-933116-98-3.
- Getches, David H.; Wilkinson, Charles F.; Williams, Robert A. (2004). Cases and Materials on Federal Indian Law (American Casebook Series). Eagan, MN: West Publishing. ISBN 0-314-14422-6.
- Getches, David; et al. (2005). Federal Indian Law. St. Paul, MN: West Publishing. ISBN 0-314-14422-6.
- Goldberg, Carole; et al. (2011). Indian Law Stories. New York: Foundation Press. ISBN 978-1-59941-729-5.
- Hays, Joel Stanford. "Twisting the Law: Legal Inconsistencies in Andrew Jackson's Treatment of Native-American Sovereignty and State Sovereignty." Journal of Southern Legal History, 21 (no. 1, 2013), 157–92.
- Hester, Thurman Lee (2001). Political Principles and Indian Sovereignty. Oxford, UK: Routledge. ISBN 0-8153-4023-0.
- McCool, Daniel (1987). Command of the Waters: Iron Triangles, Federal Water Development, and Indian Water. Tucson, AZ: University of Arizona Press. ISBN 0-520-05846-1.
- Morris, Lisa. (2015). Dying in Indian Country. Sisters, OR: Deep River Books. ISBN 978-1-940-26971-9.
- Pevar, Stephan E. (2004). The Rights of Indians and Tribes: The Authoritative ACLU Guide to Indian and Tribal Rights. New York: New York University Press. ISBN 0-8147-6718-4.
- Pommershiem, Frank (1997). Braid of Feathers: American Indian Law and Contemporary Tribal Life. Berkeley, CA: University of California Press. ISBN 0-520-20894-3.
- Prucha, Francis Paul, ed. Documents of United States Indian Policy (3rd ed. 2000)
- Prucha, Francis Paul. American Indian Treaties: The History of a Political Anomaly (1997) excerpt and text search
- Prucha, Francis Paul. The Great Father: The United States Government and the American Indians (abridged edition, 1986)
- Ruppel, Kristin T. (2007). Unearthing Indian Land: Living with the Legacies of Allotment. Tucson, AZ: University of Arizona Press. ISBN 978-0-8165-2711-3.
- Scofield, Ruth Packwood. (1992). Behind the Buckskin Curtain. New York: Carlton Press, Inc. ISBN 0-8062-4091-1
- Wilkinson, Charles (1988). American Indians, Time, and the Law: Native Societies in a Modern Constitutional Democracy. New Haven, CT: Yale University Press. ISBN 978-0-300-04136-1.
- Wilkinson, Charles (2005). Blood Struggle-The Rise of Modern Indian Nations. New York: W.W. Norton and Company. ISBN 0-393-05149-8.
  - Blood Struggle highlights major events and consequences in American Indian history since the Termination Act of 1953.
- Wilkinson, Charles (1991). Indian Tribes As Sovereign Governments: A Sourcebook on Federal-Tribal History, Law, and Policy. Stockton, CA: American Indian Lawyer. ISBN 0-939890-07-0.
- Wilkins, David (1997). American Indian Sovereignty and the U.S. Supreme Court : The Masking of Justice. Austin, TX: University of Texas Press. ISBN 0-292-79109-7.
- Wilkins, David (2011). American Indian Politics and the American Political System. Lanham, MD: Rowman & Littlefield. ISBN 978-0-8476-9306-1.
- Robert J. McCarthy, The Bureau of Indian Affairs and the Federal Trust Obligation to American Indians, 19 BYU J. PUB. L. 1 (December, 2004).

== See also ==
- Native Energy
- Pan-Indianism
- Tribal colleges and universities
- Tribal council (United States)
