= Salvucci =

Salvucci is a surname. Notable people with the surname include:

- Frederick P. Salvucci (born 1940), American civil engineer and educator
- Vinnie Salvucci, character in the movie All the Right Moves

== See also ==
- United States v. Salvucci
