= GNAA (disambiguation) =

GNAA is an abbreviation for the Gay Nigger Association of America, an Internet trolling organization.

GNAA may also refer to:

- Galleria Nazionale d'Arte Antica, a national art gallery in Italy
- Great North Air Ambulance, an English medical charity
- Gridless Narrow-Angle Astrometry, an astrometry technique
- Guilford Native American Association, a Native American community association
