= Santa Clara Pueblo v. Martinez =

- Supreme Court of the United States

Argued November 29, 1977 Decided May 15, 1978
- Full case name: Santa Clara Pueblo et al., v. Julia Martinez et al.
- Docket no.: 76-682
- Citations: 436 U.S. 49 (more) 98 S. Ct. 1670; 56 L. Ed. 2d 106; 1978 U.S. LEXIS 8

Case history
- Prior: Decision in favor of respondents, Martinez v. Santa Clara Pueblo, 402 F. Supp. 5 (D.N.M. 1975); reversed and remanded, Martinez v. Santa Clara Pueblo, 540 F.2d 1039 (10th Cir. 1976); cert. granted, 431 U.S. 913 (1977).

Holding
- Title I of the Indian Civil Rights Act does not expressly or implicitly create a cause of action for declaratory and injunctive relief in the federal courts.

Court membership
- Chief Justice Warren E. Burger Associate Justices William J. Brennan Jr. · Potter Stewart; Byron White · Thurgood Marshall; Harry Blackmun · Lewis F. Powell Jr. William Rehnquist · John P. Stevens

Case opinions
- Majority: Marshall, joined by Burger, Brennan, Stewart, Powell, Stevens; Rehnquist (all but Part III)
- Dissent: White
- Blackmun took no part in the consideration or decision of the case.

Santa Clara Pueblo v. Martinez, 436 U.S. 49 (1978), is a landmark case in the area of federal Indian law involving issues of great importance to the meaning of tribal sovereignty in the contemporary United States. The Supreme Court sustained a law passed by the governing body of the Santa Clara Pueblo that explicitly discriminated on the basis of sex. In so doing, the Court advanced a theory of tribal sovereignty that weighed the interests of tribes sufficient to justify a law that, had it been passed by a state legislature or Congress, would have almost certainly been struck down as a violation of equal protection.

Along with the watershed cases, United States v. Wheeler and Oliphant v. Suquamish Indian Tribe, Santa Clara completed the trilogy of seminal Indian law cases to come down in the 1978 term.

== Facts ==
The Petitioners were the Santa Clara Pueblo, an Indian tribe that is known to have existed for more than 600 years, and its Governor, Lucario Padilla. Respondents were Julia Martinez, a full-blooded member of the Santa Clara Pueblo, and her daughter. Martinez brought suit in federal court against the tribe and Padilla, asking the court to strike down a tribal ordinance denying membership in the tribe to children of female members who marry outside the tribe, while extending membership to children of male members who marry outside the tribe.

Martinez was married to a member of the Navajo Nation, and, according to the ordinance her children were ineligible for membership in the Santa Clara Pueblo. While her children could live with her on the reservation, they were not permitted to vote in tribal elections, hold secular office in the tribe, possess a right to remain on the reservation if their mother died, nor inherit their mother's home or her possessory interests in communally held land. The Petitioner's Brief observed that this exclusion from Pueblo membership had no bearing on whether Martinez's children (and others similarly situated) could receive federal benefits provided to Indians generally. In fact, her children were all receiving federal Indian educational and medical benefits.

Martinez claimed that the tribe's membership ordinance discriminated on the basis of both sex and ancestry in violation of Title I of the Indian Civil Rights Act of 1968 (ICRA) (Pub.L. 90–284, 82 Stat. 73, enacted April 11, 1968), which provides in relevant part that no "Indian tribe in exercising powers of self-government shall ... deny to any person within its jurisdiction the equal protection of its laws." The case was brought in the United States District Court for the District of New Mexico. The District Court found for the Petitioners, because membership rules are critical to the "social . . . self-definition" of tribes and thus vital to the tribe's survival as a distinct community. To that end, it found that striking the proper balance between equal protection and tribal self-determination was best left to the Pueblo's judgment.

The 10th Circuit Court of Appeals reversed, holding that no "compelling tribal interest" justified the ordinance's sex-based classification. The Petitioners appealed to the U.S. Supreme Court, which ultimately reversed the 10th Circuit's holding and sustained the tribal ordinance.

== Central holdings ==
1. Suits against tribes under the Indian Civil Rights Act of 1968 (ICRA) are barred by tribal sovereign immunity, since nothing on the face of ICRA purports to subject tribes to the jurisdiction of federal courts in civil actions for declaratory or injunctive relief.
2. ICRA does not authorize a private cause-of-action for declaratory and injunctive relief against the Pueblo's Governor. Congress' failure to provide remedies other than habeas corpus for enforcement of ICRA was deliberate, as is manifest from the structure of the statutory scheme and the legislative history of ICRA.

== Reasoning ==
Justice Thurgood Marshall began the majority opinion by discussing general principles of tribal sovereignty relevant to the case. He noted that tribes are distinct, sovereign political communities existing within the United States, which retain powers of self-government. These include the authority to pass substantive laws governing internal matters, such as tribal membership. Furthermore, because tribes are separate sovereigns that existed prior to the ratification of the U.S. Constitution, constitutional protections such as those provided by the Fourteenth Amendment, do not constrain tribes on their own terms.

Instead, Congress must exercise its plenary power over tribes to abridge tribal sovereignty. The substantive rights guarantees of the Indian Civil Rights act, such as the guarantee of equal protection under the law, represent such an abridgment. It is unclear, however, if Congress intended to permit federal suits against tribes, by individuals such as Martinez, to enforce those rights. Two doctrines of law, sovereign immunity and implied causes-of-action, were examined to decide if Congress intended to permit such suits.

Part III of the opinion addressed why the Pueblo was immune from suit. Tribes, like states and the federal government, are generally entitled to sovereign immunity, which means they cannot be sued in court without their consent. Congress may, however, abrogate a tribe's sovereign immunity pursuant to its plenary power. Finding that nothing in the text of ICRA appeared to waive tribal immunity, Justice Marshall held the Pueblo immune from suit in federal court. This meant the tribe could not be sued for passing the membership ordinance, which indirectly protected the law from being struck down under ICRA.

Part IV analyzed whether the case may proceed against the other Petitioner, Governor Padillo. Padillo, being an officer of the tribe, does not receive the protection of tribal sovereign immunity. The obstacle for Martinez was that ICRA did not explicitly authorize suits against tribes in federal court. For her case to be lawful, the Court would need to find an implied cause-of-action that permitted federal suits against tribes.

To emphasize the importance of this decision, Justice Marshall observed that finding a private cause-of-action would interfere with tribal sovereignty in a way the text of the statute does not, on its own terms, allow. It would disrupt the ability of tribes to govern themselves. Out of respect for tribal sovereignty, the Court decided to "tread lightly", given the lack of express Congressional direction as to whether it has exercised its plenary power to diminish tribal sovereignty.

Justice Marshall proceeded to analyze the statute's legislative history and structure under the Supreme Court's implied cause-of-action case law. This case law requires consideration of factors including, whether a cause-of-action is supported by the legislative history of the statute and whether a cause-of-action would be consistent with the statute's purpose. While ICRA was designed to secure Constitutional rights to tribal members as against their tribal governments, it did not include all rights citizens enjoy under the Constitution. For example, ICRA made no mention of a prohibition on the establishment of religion or require the appointment of counsel for indigent criminal defendants. These exceptions reflect the other purpose of ICRA: to safeguard and promote tribal sovereignty. ICRA imposed an obligation on tribal governments to respect the rights enumerated, but it was tribal courts that were intended to vindicate those rights, not federal ones. Creating a cause-of-action would undermine the latter goal of ICRA and, in addition, impose significant financial burdens on the already economically disadvantaged tribes.

This decision to not imply a cause-of-action was further supported by how ICRA specifically permits habeas corpus petitions in federal court. This is a less intrusive form of review than Congress otherwise could have prescribed. Additionally, the legislative history of ICRA indicated that Congress considered, but rejected, proposals that would have permitted federal review of civil ICRA violations by the Attorney General and the Secretary of the Interior. In light of this history, Justice Marshall decided it would be "highly unlikely" that Congress intended to create a private cause-of-action in federal courts to enforce ICRA.

Justice Marshall concluded his opinion with an affirmation of tribal self-determination, the quasi-sovereign status of tribes, and how threatening federal review of ICRA claims would be to the cultural and political survival of tribes. He reiterated that Congress may authorize such federal review, but "unless and until Congress" acts, the Court would not imply a private cause-of-action for it.

== Dissent ==
Justice Byron White wrote a solo dissent, disagreeing with the majority's opinion. He acknowledged the importance of tribal culture but did not think concern for it should protect arbitrary or unconstitutional tribal official action. He was unpersuaded by the majority's position that Congress's rejection of federal review of ICRA violations, indicated Congress did not intend to create a private federal cause-of-action for ICRA violations. Those proposals would have primarily affected off-reservation violations of Indian rights by non-Indians, like illegal detentions by state officials. They had nothing to do with whether a tribal member can sue a tribe in federal court.

For Justice White, the most important consideration was whether the private cause-of-action would be consistent with the purpose of ICRA. That was clearly the case because ICRA was designed, first and foremost, to safeguard to Indians the same constitutional rights other Americans enjoy. A private cause-of-action is necessary to effectuate those rights. He cited legislative history suggesting Congressional concern regarding the lack of remedies for violations of Indian rights. Justice White argued that it would be inconsistent with this purpose of ICRA to limit review of ICRA violations to tribal institutions. For instance, the judicial and legislative powers of the Santa Clara Pueblo are both vested in the Pueblo Council. This means the same body that passed the allegedly unlawful ordinance would be deciding if it violates ICRA. A private federal cause-of-action is necessary to avoid this conflict-of-interest.

Finally, Justice White addressed the competing purpose of ICRA: to protect and promote tribal sovereignty. He stated that ICRA and its attendant imposition of rights on the tribes was already a major intrusion on tribal sovereignty. A federal cause-of-action would simply give meaning to those rights, as there cannot be a right without a remedy.

== Significance ==
=== Doctrinal effects ===
The case greatly limited the influence of the Indian Civil Rights Act of 1968 outside of tribal courts. In finding no private cause-of-action, the ability of individual tribe members to bring cases in a federal court for alleged violations of their rights under ICRA, was greatly diminished. As the Court recognized in Santa Clara, the only express means to bring ICRA claims in a federal court is through a habeas corpus petition, an action explicitly authorized by the Indian Civil Rights Act. The Court's reasoning also reflects an attitude of solicitude for tribal sovereignty with respect to implied causes-of-action. It was because of the importance of tribal sovereignty that the factors the Court used to decide whether to find a cause-of-action militated against finding one.

=== Subsequent cases ===
Santa Clara has been cited and discussed by the Supreme Court in a diverse set of subsequent Indian law decisions. Notable examples include:

Merrion v. Jicarilla Apache Tribe, 455 U.S. 130 (1982): In upholding a tribal tax of on-reservation oil and gas production as an exercise of the inherent sovereignty of a tribe to govern its internal affairs, the Court (in an opinion by Justice Marshall) cited the passage in Santa Clara stating that it will "tread lightly" where Congress has not expressly indicated its intent as to whether it has used its plenary power to abridge tribal sovereignty. In his dissent in the case, Justice Stevens cited Santa Clara for the proposition that the equal protection principles of the Fifth and Fourteenth Amendments do not limit tribal power in the same way they limit state and federal power. This means, according to Justice Stevens, tribal sovereignty over members is, in some ways, greater than a state's power over its citizens.

Rice v. Cayetano, 528 U.S. 495 (2000): In this case, the majority struck down a Hawaii state law that restricted voting in elections for Trustees of the Office of Hawaiian Affairs to persons with a specific degree of Native Hawaiian ancestry, for being an unconstitutional, race-based classification. Justice Breyer, concurring in the judgment, cited Santa Clara to illustrate the principle that tribes possess broad authority to define their membership. He nevertheless agreed with the majority's conclusion that the "race-based" classification was unconstitutional. This was in part because it was the state of Hawaii, rather than Native Hawaiians, who created the problematic classification.

Nevada v. Hicks, 533 U.S. 353 (2001): The Hicks Court held that tribal courts do not have jurisdiction over state officials who act on a reservation to investigate off-reservation violations of state law. Justice Souter, concurring in the judgment, cited Santa Clara to illustrate a tension in the Court's Indian law jurisprudence on the role of tribal courts. He first observed that Santa Clara affirmed the appropriateness of tribal courts as the exclusive forum for adjudicating disputes involving "important personal and property interests of both Indians and non-Indians." He contrasted this holding of Santa Clara with cases like Oliphant and Montana, which suggest tribes and their courts lack jurisdiction over non-members.

Michigan v. Bay Mills Indian Community, 572 U.S. 782 (2014): The Supreme Court held that tribal sovereign immunity protects a tribe from suit for operating a casino outside Indian lands. In her majority opinion, Justice Kagan cited Santa Clara for the proposition that in spite of federal plenary power, tribes remain separate sovereigns who pre-exist the Constitution. She further cited Santa Clara's holding that tribes enjoy sovereign immunity and that any Congressional abrogation of tribal sovereign immunity must be explicit. Justice Kagan, like Justice Marshall in Merrion, cited the "tread lightly" language of Santa Clara to emphasize the importance of demanding an express Congressional statement as to whether it is changing the extent of tribal sovereignty.

U.S. v. Bryant, 579 U.S. 140 (2016): In this case, the Court held that tribal criminal court convictions for domestic violence that were obtained against a defendant not represented by counsel, were admissible in a subsequent federal criminal case (where they empowered prosecutors to seek a higher sentence for the defendant). This was because the Sixth Amendment right to counsel does not apply to the tribes. Justice Ginsburg, writing for the majority, cited Santa Clara for the principle that the Constitution and its limits on state and federal power do not apply to the tribes, as they are separate sovereigns pre-existing the Constitution. This was critical in reaching the conclusion that the Sixth Amendment does not apply to tribes.

=== Administrative Law ===
The Supreme Court's decision in Santa Clara has also been cited in administrative agency rules and decisions. Notable examples include:

Indian Child Welfare Act Proceedings. 81 FR 38778 (2016). 25 CFR 23. This Final Rule improves implementation of the Indian Child Welfare Act (ICWA), including requirements imposed on State courts to fully comply with ICWA and to maintain certain records. The Final Rule cites Santa Clara to affirm that delineating membership requirements is a sovereign function of tribes.

Procedures for Reestablishing a Formal Government-to-Government Relationship With the Native Hawaiian Community. 81 FR 71278 (2016). 43 CFR 50. This Final Rule establishes an administrative process and criteria for the Secretary of the Interior to use to re-establish a formal government-to-government relationship with the Native Hawaiian Community if the Community ever forms a government and seeks such a relationship. The Final Rule cites Santa Clara for the principle that Native communities may define their own membership and concludes that the Native Hawaiian community can decide what "tests" they wish to use to ascertain whether an individual can be a member.

Secretary of Labor v. Navajo Forest Products Industries, 8 O.S.H. Cas. (BNA) 2094 (1980). Shortly after Santa Clara was decided, the Occupational Safety Health Review Commission decided that a Navajo Nation tribal enterprise was exempt from the Occupational Safety and Health Act of 1970, including the application of citations and penalties levied against the enterprise pursuant to the Act. The Commission cited Santa Clara for the proposition that tribes retain the sovereign authority to establish substantive law and regulate their own internal affairs. This understanding of tribal sovereignty was considered in connection with a treaty between the Navajo Nation and the United States limiting the kinds of federal officials who could be present and act on the reservation. The treaty was read to preserve, rather than cede, the tribal sovereignty affirmed in Santa Clara. The Commission thus concluded that the treaty precluded enforcement of the Act against the tribal enterprise.

Larry Martin v. Billings Area Director, Bureau of Indian Affairs, 19 IBIA 279 (1991): The Interior Board of Indian Affairs (IBIA), which reviews decisions by the Bureau of Indian Affairs (BIA) involving Indian affairs, was asked to consider an appeal by a subcontractor who was performing home renovations on the Assiniboine and Sioux Tribes of the Fort Peck Indian Reservation, under an Indian Self-Determination Act (ISDA) contract. The IBIA cited the discussion of the dual purposes of ICRA in Santa Clara to find that, like ICRA, ISDA does not have an implied cause-of-action to challenge tribal action. The Indian Self-Determination Act has only one purpose: promoting tribal sovereignty. This means the reasoning of Santa Clara applies even more forcefully, as there are no countervailing purposes that might support an implied cause-of-action. Finding a cause-of-action would undermine the purpose of ISDA, just like how finding a cause-of-action in Santa Clara would have undermined the purpose of ICRA.

Welmas and Dukic v. Sacramento Area Director, Bureau of Indian Affairs, 24 IBIA 264 (1993): The BIA was asked by members of the Cabazon Band of Mission Indians to review sanctions imposed on them by the Band's tribal council. The IBIA analyzed Santa Clara in its determination that ICRA did not grant the BIA authority to review the tribal action at issue. The IBIA referenced Santa Clara's discussion of an administrative review process that Congress rejected in passing ICRA as evidence that the review sought by the Band members was "specifically rejected" by Congress and thus not authorized by ICRA.

=== Equal protection ===
As the Court did not reach the merits, the questions of whether a "compelling tribal interest" is required to justify tribal laws that discriminate on the basis of sex, and if one is, what constitutes such an interest, were not resolved. The Briefs did, however, present arguments on this important issue.

The Petitioners' Brief emphasized how ICRA rights guarantees are not as strong as constitutional ones and so the standard in equal protection cases should be lower than strict scrutiny (the standard signalled by the 10th Circuit's use of the "compelling tribal interest" phrase). It contended for the lowest established standard of review, the "rational relation" test, which would only require a rational relationship to exist between the law and its intended purpose. This was the case here, as the tribe's political and cultural independence depended on its ability to maintain its patrilineal social order. This interest in the tribe's survival was "compelling," and certainly "rationally related" to the ordinance.

The Respondents' Brief argued for a higher form of review as the tribal law at issue involved a sex-based discrimination. The Brief pointed to the fact that recent Supreme Court precedent established a higher standard for state and federal sex-based classifications: intermediate scrutiny. Additionally, the mere fact that the Pueblo had a tradition of treating male and female members differently, is not sufficient to justify the classification.

=== Scholarly commentary ===
The decision spurred a robust debate within legal academia. For example, Catharine MacKinnon wrote that the tribal ordinance was patriarchal, aimed at perpetuating male supremacy in the Pueblo. While she recognized the importance of tribal sovereignty, she contended that by disadvantaging women, the ordinance ultimately undermined the tribe's autonomy as a distinct community. This was because, to MacKinnon, the law was a concession to male-supremacist, colonialist United States policy. MacKinnon believed the law was passed because the tribal council feared the U.S. government might impose allotment on the tribe. MacKinnon asserted that in many other tribes whose land had been allotted, much of the land passed out of tribal hands when female members married male non-members, as the husbands would acquire control of the land. This would not happen when male members married female non-members. Thus, the ordinance was aimed at protecting the integrity of the tribe's land holdings. Yet, by giving preference to male intermarriage while punishing female intermarriage, the tribe was cowing to the U.S. government's threat of allotment, thereby undermining tribal autonomy.

Francine Skenandore responded to MacKinnon's position with an account of Indian feminism that presents tribal identity and tribal women's identity as deeply linked. This results in an emphasis less on gender equality and more on tribal survival and autonomy. Skenandore argues that MacKinnon is trying to force Native women to choose between their identity as women and identity as tribal members, whereas she believes the two work together. Thus, the decision in Santa Clara advanced Indian feminism insofar as it preserved tribal sovereignty and the ability of the tribe to work through its understanding of gender equality outside the control of United States law and empire. She points out that MacKinnon does not understand how tribal membership is a privilege, not a right and that MacKinnon uses rights language to wholly dismiss tribal culture and tradition. The Petitioners' Brief provides support for Skenandore's critique. The Brief noted that the membership ordinance simply codified an unwritten tribal rule that had existed from time immemorial.

Rina Swentzell, a Santa Clara Pueblo member, wrote of how the decision affirming the tribe's self-determination to decide who is a member was critical to the Pueblo's continuance as an independent community. It was a community issue that ought be handled internally by the members, not imposed on them by the Supreme Court. In her article, "Testimony of a Santa Clara Woman," she discusses how balance, in life and between the sexes, is an important part of Santa Clara Pueblan culture and tradition. She notes that the 1936 Santa Clara Constitution, pursuant to which the membership ordinance was passed, was primarily written by non-pueblo individuals.

Judith Resnik provides a similar critique of the decision as MacKinnon. She questions the role of tradition and history in the rule, instead identifying the ordinance as a product of U.S. influence, if not encouragement. It reflects the long-standing U.S. tradition of subjugating women. Skenandore responded to Resnik as well, noting that her argument suggests tribes have been assimilated into the dominant legal culture of the United States and questions their existence as distinct communities. This ignores the long, and continuing, history of tribal resistance to assimilation. Skenandore reiterates that Native feminists understand the connection between gender identity and tribal identity and how critical the preservation of tribal sovereignty is to their feminism.

== The Role of Culture and Tradition ==
Scholars of Pueblo history and anthropology note that culture played an important role in how the 1939 membership ordinance was understood and later presented in court. During the case, the ordinance was often described as part of a longstanding patrilineal tradition. However, kinship practices and government structure have historically been more varied, according to anthropological research on Tewa communities. Alfonso Ortiz, a Tewa cultural anthropologist, notes that Tewa social life is not constructed upon a single line of descent, but by complex relationships and shared responsibilities between men and women. His work suggests that Pueblo ideas about belonging and descent do not fit neatly into the categories used during the legal arguments.

Similar concerns over the presentation of tradition during the trial have been criticized by other scholars. According to Joanne Barker, describing Pueblo culture as purely patrilineal minimizes the ways in which Tewa people have traditionally established reciprocal roles for men and women. Alcario Tafoya, the former governor of Santa Clara, made a statement during the trial's rebuttal testimony that support this. According to Tafoya, prior to the 1939 ordinance, a child's affiliation with the Pueblo could follow either parent, depending on the circumstances, and was not always dependent on paternal descent.

These accounts suggest that certain interpretations of tradition, rather than entire historical practices, were reflected in the cultural explanations employed during the case. This nuance is significant because, while determining the legal extent of tribal governance, the Supreme Court assumed the law reflected a longstanding Tewa tradition. Historical research shows that contemporary Pueblo governance has been shaped through internal matters and other interactions with outside governments. This information supplements the explanation of the membership ordinance's broader cultural implications and to the Court's ruling in the Santa Clara Pueblo v. Martinez case

== See also ==
- Santa Clara Indian Reservation
- Indian Civil Rights Act of 1968
- List of United States Supreme Court cases, volume 436
