= Cotton Petroleum Corp. v. New Mexico =

- Supreme Court of the United States

Argued November 30, 1988 Decided April 25, 1989
- Full case name: Cotton Petroleum Corp. v. New Mexico
- Citations: 490 U.S. 163 (more) 109 S. Ct. 1698; 104 L. Ed. 2d 209

Case history
- Prior: Cotton Petroleum v. State, 106 N.M. 517, 745 P.2d 1170 (N.M. Ct. App. 1987)

Holding
- There is no "proportionality requirement" for the amount collected from tribes to be equitable to the services rendered by the government. Further, current case law allows states can impose non-discriminatory taxes on non-Tribal entities that do business with tribes, but Congress may offer immunity if it chooses.

Court membership
- Chief Justice William Rehnquist Associate Justices William J. Brennan Jr. · Byron White; Thurgood Marshall · Harry Blackmun; John P. Stevens · Sandra Day O'Connor; Antonin Scalia · Anthony Kennedy

Case opinions
- Majority: Stevens, joined by Rehnquist, White, O'Connor, Scalia, Kennedy
- Dissent: Blackmun, joined by Brennan, Marshall

Cotton Petroleum Corp. v. New Mexico, 490 U.S. 163 (1989), was a United States Supreme Court case that decided states may impose taxes on non-tribal commercial activity that takes place on tribal land.

== Background ==
The case followed the earlier Supreme Court ruling Merrion v. Jicarilla Apache Tribe (1982), which approved of the Jicarilla Apache charging a severance tax for oil extraction on tribal land.

Accordingly, Cotton Petroleum, a non-Indian corporation, extracted oil and agreed to pay the tribe a 6% severance tax. However, the State of New Mexico collected an additional 8% severance tax, which it levied on all oil producers in the state. Cotton paid the state tax in protest, filed the lawsuit, and asserted that the state tax was preempted by federal law.

== Decision ==
The Court applied Bracker balancing by weighing state, tribal, and federal interests. Because the state provided Cotton $89,384 in services, the Court found sufficient state interest to justify the state tax. The amount collected in taxes, $2,293,953, far exceeded the value of the state services, but the Court held there was no "proportionality requirement." The Court further explained that current case law allows states to impose non-discriminatory taxes on non-tribal entities that do business with tribes and noted that Congress may offer immunity if it chooses.
