= Brendale v. Confederated Yakima Indian Nation =

Brendale v. Confederated Tribes & Bands of Yakima Indian Nation
- Supreme Court of the United States

Argued January 18, 1989 Decided June 29, 1989
- Full case name: Philip Brendale, et al. v. Confederated Tribes and Bands of the Yakima Indian Nation
- Citations: 492 U.S. 408 (more) 109 S. Ct. 2994; 106 L. Ed. 2d 343; 1989 U.S. LEXIS 3147; 57 U.S.L.W. 4908

Court membership
- Chief Justice William Rehnquist Associate Justices William J. Brennan Jr. · Byron White; Thurgood Marshall · Harry Blackmun; John P. Stevens · Sandra Day O'Connor; Antonin Scalia · Anthony Kennedy

Case opinions
- Majority: White, joined by Rehnquist, O'Connor, Scalia, Kennedy
- Dissent: Blackmun, joined by Brennan, Marshall, Stevens

Laws applied
- Indian General Allotment Act

Brendale v. Confederated Tribes & Bands of Yakima Indian Nation, 492 U.S. 408 (1989), is a United States Supreme Court case in which the Court held that the Yakima Indian Nation did not hold exclusive zoning authority over all fee lands in their reservation.

== Background ==
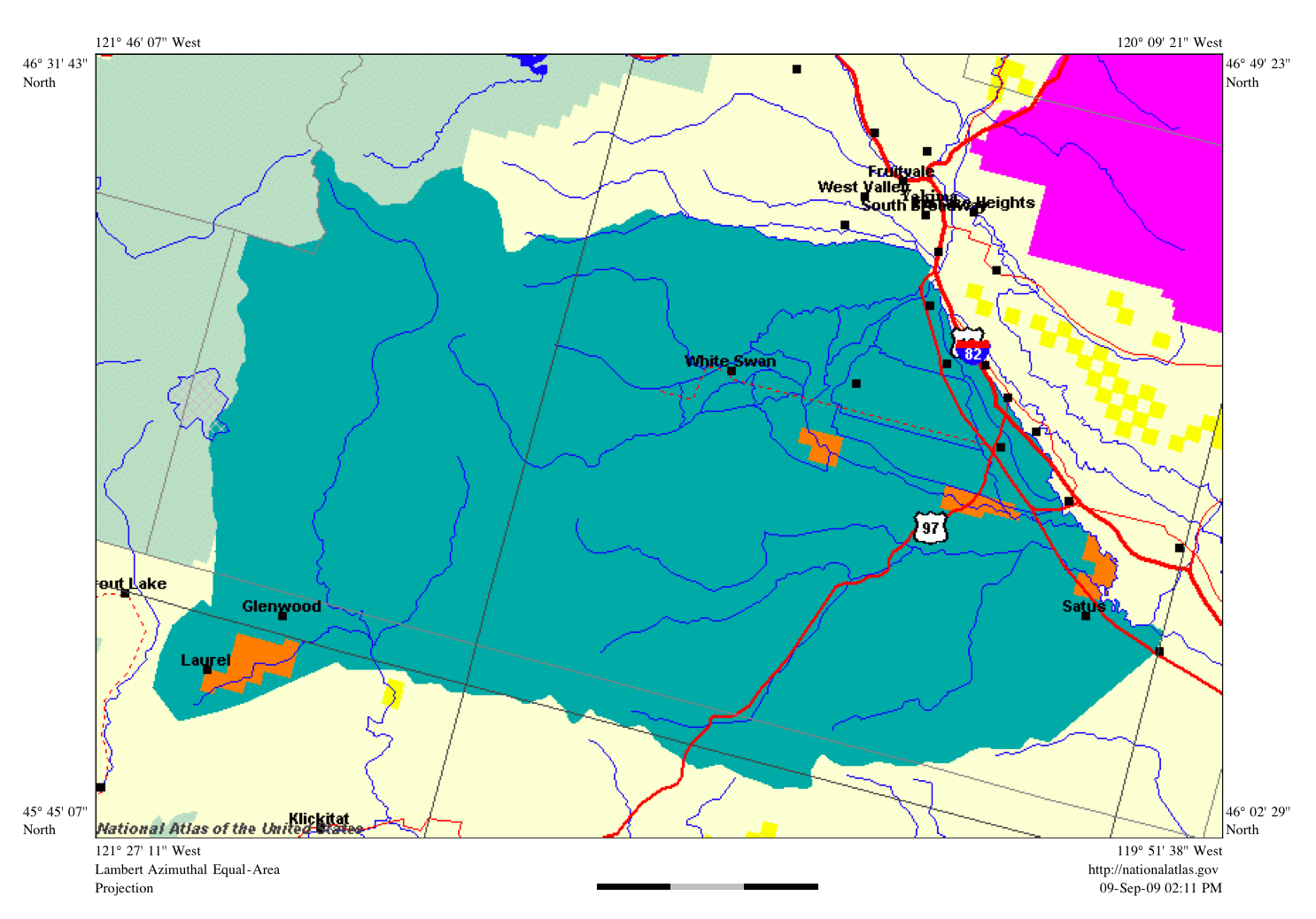
Yakama Indian Reservation map

The Yakama Nation is an Indian tribe with its reservation in southern Washington. The tribe comprises 14 distinct Indian tribes that the U.S. banded together in the 1850s for the purpose of treaty making. The current treaty was ratified by the Senate in 1859, under this treaty the tribe reserved to itself 1,387,505 acres (561,503 ha; 2,167.977 sq mi) for its reservation, as well as the right to exercise certain reserved rights on ceded lands and usual and accustomed locations. The reservation has tribal land and land held in fee. The fee land is owned by both tribal members and non-Indians, and tribal members are outnumbered greatly by non-Indians.

== Supreme Court ==
After a series of legal challenges in lower courts, the case was brought before the United States Supreme Court on appeal. The Supreme Court affirmed the lower court's decision regarding the Brendale property but reversed the decision regarding the Wilkinson property. The Court held that under the Indian General Allotment Act, 24 Stat. 388, the Yakima Nation no longer retained the exclusive use and benefit of the land and had no regulatory power over lands held in fee by non-tribal Indians where its interest in regulating the fee land was not demonstrably serious and its political integrity, the economic security, or health and welfare of the Yakima Nation was not imperiled.

== See also ==
- Yakama
- Washington v. Confederated Bands and Tribes of the Yakima Indian Nation
