= Harris v. McRae =

- Supreme Court of the United States

Argued April 21, 1980 Decided June 30, 1980
- Full case name: Patricia Harris, Secretary of Health and Human Services v. Cora McRae, et al.
- Citations: 448 U.S. 297 (more) 100 S. Ct. 2671; 65 L. Ed. 2d 784; 1980 U.S. LEXIS 145

Case history
- Prior: McRae v. Califano, 491 F. Supp. 630 (E.D.N.Y. 1980)
- Subsequent: Petition for rehearing denied, 448 U.S. 917 (1980).

Holding
- States that participated in Medicaid were not required to fund medically necessary abortions for which federal reimbursement was unavailable as a result of the Hyde Amendment. The funding restrictions of the Hyde Amendment did not violate either the Fifth Amendment or the Establishment Clause of the First Amendment.

Court membership
- Chief Justice Warren E. Burger Associate Justices William J. Brennan Jr. · Potter Stewart; Byron White · Thurgood Marshall; Harry Blackmun · Lewis F. Powell Jr. William Rehnquist · John P. Stevens

Case opinions
- Majority: Stewart, joined by Burger, White, Powell, Rehnquist
- Concurrence: White
- Dissent: Brennan, joined by Marshall, Blackmun
- Dissent: Marshall
- Dissent: Blackmun
- Dissent: Stevens

Laws applied
- U.S. Const. amends. I, V; Hyde Amendment

Harris v. McRae, 448 U.S. 297 (1980), was a case in which the Supreme Court of the United States held that states participating in Medicaid are not required to fund medically necessary abortions for which federal reimbursement was unavailable as a result of the Hyde Amendment, which restricted the use of federal funds for abortion. The Court also held that the funding restrictions of the Hyde Amendment did not violate the Fifth Amendment or the Establishment Clause of the First Amendment.

== Background ==
In 1965, the U.S. Congress amended Title XIX of the Social Security Act to create Medicaid, a voluntary program to provide federal funds to states that choose to provide reimbursement for certain medical expenses for the indigent.

In September 1976, Congress began to ban the use of federal funds to reimburse the cost of abortions under Medicaid. Initially, the only exception was if the life of the mother would be endangered by the fetus being carried to term. The restrictions became known as the Hyde Amendment, after the measure's original sponsor, Illinois Representative Henry Hyde. The language of the 1980 Hyde Amendment provided:

[None] of the funds provided by this joint resolution shall be used to perform abortions except where the life of the mother would be endangered if the fetus were carried to term; or except for such medical procedures necessary for the victims of rape or incest when such rape or incest has been reported promptly to a law enforcement agency or public health service.

In 1976, after the passage of the original Hyde Amendment, an action was brought in the United States District Court for the Eastern District of New York that sought to enjoin enforcement of its restrictions. The plaintiffs were Cora McRae, a New York Medicaid recipient who was in the first trimester of a pregnancy that she wished to abort; the New York City Health and Hospitals Corp., which operated hospitals providing abortion services; officers of the Women's Division of the Board of Global Ministries of the United Methodist Church; and the Women's Division itself. McRae sought to bring the action as a class action on behalf of other similarly situated women. The District Court granted the class certification motion and permitted US Senators James L. Buckley and Jesse Helms as well as Hyde to intervene as defendants.

The district court granted the injunction on January 15, 1980, and found that the Hyde Amendment violated the Fifth Amendment's Due Process Clause and the First Amendment's Establishment Clause.

== Supreme Court decision ==
Justice Stewart delivered the opinion of the Court in which Chief Justice Burger, Justice White, Justice Powell, and Justice Rehnquist joined. Justice White wrote an opinion concurring the judgment. Justice Brennan wrote a dissent to which Justice Marshall and Justice Blackmun joined. Justice Marshall and Justice Blackmun also wrote separate dissents, and Justice Stevens did so as well.

The Court held that states participating in the Medicaid program were not obligated to fund medically necessary abortions under Title XIX. The Court found that a woman's freedom of choice does not carry with it "a constitutional entitlement to the financial resources to avail herself of the full range of protected choices." The Court ruled that because the Equal Protection Clause is not a source of substantive rights and because poverty does not qualify as a "suspect classification," the Hyde Amendment does not violate the Fifth Amendment. Finally, the Court held that the coincidence of the funding restrictions of the statute with tenets of the Roman Catholic Church does not constitute an establishment of religion.

== See also ==
- List of United States Supreme Court cases, volume 448
