= National Farmers Union Insurance Cos. v. Crow Tribe =

- Supreme Court of the United States

Decided June 3, 1985
- Full case name: National Farmers Union Insurance Cos. v. Crow Tribe
- Citations: 471 U.S. 845 (more)

Holding
- Tribal court remedies must be exhausted before tribal court jurisdiction can be challenged in federal court.

Court membership
- Chief Justice Warren E. Burger Associate Justices William J. Brennan Jr. · Byron White; Thurgood Marshall · Harry Blackmun; Lewis F. Powell Jr. · William Rehnquist; John P. Stevens · Sandra Day O'Connor

National Farmers Union Insurance Cos. v. Crow Tribe, 471 U.S. 845 (1985), was a United States Supreme Court case in which the Court held that tribal court remedies must be exhausted before tribal court jurisdiction can be challenged in federal court.

== Significance ==
This case ensured that tribal courts would be able to decide questions of tribal civil jurisdiction on their own, at least initially. However, later cases like Strate v. A-1 Contractors and Nevada v. Hicks narrowed the exhaustion requirement from this case.
