= White Mountain Apache Tribe v. Bracker =

- Supreme Court of the United States

Argued January 14, 1980 Decided June 27, 1980
- Full case name: White Mountain Apache Tribe, et al. v. Bracker, et al.
- Citations: 448 U.S. 136 (more) 100 S. Ct. 2578; 65 L. Ed. 2d 665; 1980 U.S. LEXIS 52

Case history
- Prior: White Mountain Apache Tribe v. Bracker, 585 P.2d 891 (Ariz. Ct. App. 1978); cert. granted, 444 U.S. 823 (1979).

Holding
- Arizona's taxes that were assessed against a non-Indian contractor that was working exclusively for an Indian tribe on that tribe's reservation were preempted by federal law

Court membership
- Chief Justice Warren E. Burger Associate Justices William J. Brennan Jr. · Potter Stewart; Byron White · Thurgood Marshall; Harry Blackmun · Lewis F. Powell Jr. William Rehnquist · John P. Stevens

Case opinions
- Majority: Marshall, joined by Burger, Brennan, White, Blackmun, Powell
- Concurrence: Powell
- Dissent: Stevens, joined by Stewart, Rehnquist

Laws applied
- U.S. Const. art. 1, §8, cl. 3; 4 U.S.C. § 104; 4 U.S.C. § 105, et seq.

White Mountain Apache Tribe v. Bracker, 448 U.S. 136 (1980), was a case in which the Supreme Court of the United States holding that Arizona's taxes that were assessed against a non-Indian contractor that was working exclusively for an Indian tribe on that tribe's reservation were preempted by federal law.

== Background ==
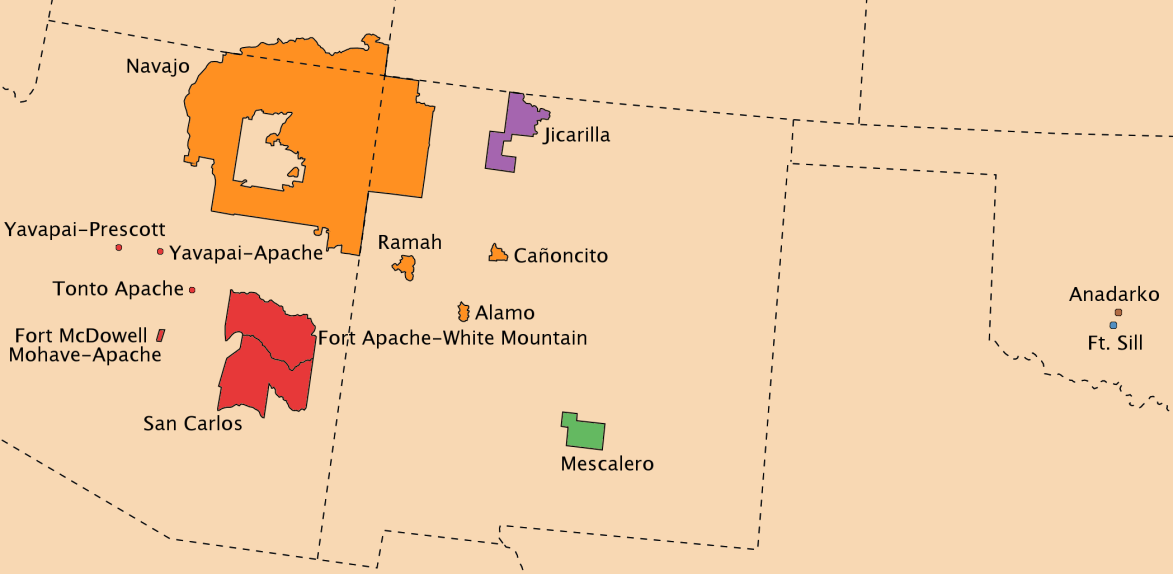
Map showing the Fort Apache Indian Reservation (in red - upper half)

=== History ===
The Fort Apache Timber Company (FATCO) is a tribal enterprise created by the White Mountain Apache tribe contracted with the Pinetop Logging Company (Pinetop) in 1969 to transport and sell lumber harvested by FATCO on the Fort Apache Indian Reservation. The lumber itself is harvested from land held in trust by the Bureau of Indian Affairs (BIA) for the benefit of the tribe. The BIA has a contract with FATCO to harvest the trees, but the BIA controlled which trees would be taken, the equipment to be used, where and what roads would be used and logging truck speeds. Pinetop vehicles do not leave the reservation, and only used roads built and maintained by BIA. In 1971, the Arizona Highway Department (now the Arizona Department of Transportation) sought to collect a motor carrier tax and a fuel tax from Pinetop. Pinetop paid under protest, and both Pinetop and the tribe sued to recover the taxes.

=== Lower courts ===
The Superior Court of Maricopa County, Arizona, granted a summary judgment to the state and both the tribe and Pinetop appealed. At the Arizona Court of Appeals, Pinetop argued that McClanahan v. Arizona State Tax Comm'n prohibited the taxes that Arizona sought. The state argued that Pinetop was not part of the tribe and were not owned by Indians, and therefore the tax applied. The appellate court affirmed the decision of the trial court. Both the tribe and Pinetop appealed, but the Arizona Supreme Court declined to review the decision. The United States Supreme Court then granted certiorari to hear the case.

== Opinion of the Court ==
Justice Thurgood Marshall delivered the opinion of the court. Marshall held that when a state seeks to assert authority over activities on a reservation by a non-Indian, that the court must look at the nature of the state, federal and tribal interests that are at stake. Here, the federal government, through the BIA, extensively regulated and controlled the timber operation and are so pervasive as to preclude any state taxation of the non-Indian contractor. The decision of the Arizona Court of Appeals was reversed.

=== Concurrence ===
Justice Lewis F. Powell, Jr., concurred with the majority. The fact that the roads that Pinetop used were BIA or tribal roads would mean that the state was taxing for revenue that would not be needed to maintain the roads being used, and that this amounted to double taxation.

=== Dissent ===
Justice John Paul Stevens, joined by Justices Potter Stewart and William Rehnquist, dissented. Stevens believed that the state could tax Pinetop, and that it was not relevant as to whether those taxes were passed on to the tribe. He would have affirmed the decision.
