= United States v. Sioux Nation of Indians =

- Supreme Court of the United States

Argued March 24, 1980 Decided June 30, 1980
- Full case name: United States v. Sioux Nation of Indians, et al.
- Citations: 448 U.S. 371 (more) 100 S. Ct. 2716; 65 L. Ed. 2d 844; 1980 U.S. LEXIS 147

Case history
- Prior: Sioux Nation of Indians, et al. v. United States, 601 F.2d 1157 (Ct. Cl. 1979).

Holding
- 1) The enactment by Congress of a law allowing the Sioux Nation to pursue a claim against the United States that had been previously adjudicated did not violate the doctrine of separation of powers, and 2) the taking of property that was set aside for the use of the tribe required just compensation, including interest.

Court membership
- Chief Justice Warren E. Burger Associate Justices William J. Brennan Jr. · Potter Stewart; Byron White · Thurgood Marshall; Harry Blackmun · Lewis F. Powell Jr. William Rehnquist · John P. Stevens

Case opinions
- Majority: Blackmun, joined by Burger, Brennan, Stewart, Marshall, Powell, Stevens; White (parts III, V only)
- Concurrence: White
- Dissent: Rehnquist

Laws applied
- U.S. Const. amend. V; 15 Stat. 635

United States v. Sioux Nation of Indians, 448 U.S. 371 (1980), was a United States Supreme Court case in which the Court held that: 1) the enactment by Congress of a law allowing the Sioux Nation to pursue a claim against the United States that had been previously adjudicated did not violate the doctrine of separation of powers; and 2) the taking of property in the Black Hill region of South Dakota which had been set aside for the use of the tribe required just compensation, including interest. The Sioux have not accepted the financial compensation awarded to them by this case, valued at over $2 billion as of 2022, and have insisted on regaining control of the land.

== Facts of the case ==
The Treaty of Fort Laramie (1868) pledged that the Great Sioux Reservation, including the Black Hills, would be "set apart for the absolute and undisturbed use and occupation of the Indians." By the terms of the treaty, cession of any part of the reservation required a new treaty executed and signed by at least three fourths of all the adult male Indians occupying the land. The Sioux's right to hunt in some unceded territories were protected by the Fort Laramie Treaty as well. The Fort Laramie Treaty ended Red Cloud's War, a series of military engagements in which the Sioux tribes, led by chief Red Cloud, fought to protect the integrity of earlier-recognized treaty lands from the incursion of white settlers.

The 1868 treaty brought peace for a few years, but in 1874 an exploratory expedition under General George A. Custer entered the Black Hills to investigate rumors of gold. "Custer's florid descriptions of the mineral and timber resources of the Black Hills, and the land's suitability for grazing and cultivation... received wide circulation, and had the effect of creating an intense popular demand for the 'opening' of the Hills for settlement." Initially the U.S. military tried to turn away trespassing miners and settlers. Eventually, however, President Grant, the Secretary of the Interior, and the Secretary of War "decided that the military should make no further resistance to the occupation of the Black Hills by miners." These orders were to be enforced "quietly" and the President's decision was to remain "confidential".

As more and more settlers and gold miners invaded the Black Hills, the government concluded that the only practical course was to take the land from the Sioux, and appointed a commission to negotiate the purchase. The negotiations failed, and so the US resorted to military force. They used as a pretext to declare the Sioux Indians "hostile" their failure to obey an order to return from an off-reservation hunting expedition in the dead of winter when travel was impossible. The consequent military expedition to remove the Sioux from the Black Hills included an attack on their village on the Little Bighorn River led by Custer. The attack culminated in the victory of Chiefs Sitting Bull and Crazy Horse over the 7th Cavalry Regiment now known as Battle of the Little Bighorn.

That victory was short-lived. Those Indians who survived subsequent battles to surrender to the Army were interned on a reservation and deprived of their weapons and horses, "leaving them completely dependent for survival on rations provided them by the Government." In August 1876, Congress enacted a bill cutting off appropriations "made for the subsistence" of the Sioux unless they ceded the Black Hills to the United States. A commission headed by George Manypenny presented the Sioux with a new treaty and they signed, under threat of starvation. Only a few leaders signed, not the 3/4 majority of all Indian males on the reservation as required under the Fort Laramie Treaty.

== S. 590 (1876) ==
After the "Army's withdrawal from its role as enforcer of the Fort Laramie Treaty" the previous year and its subsequent return to prepare for a military campaign against the Sioux, a bill was introduced in the U.S. Senate to authorize "a peaceful settlement" with the Sioux Nation for the Black Hills. A proposed "five-member commission" would have asked the Sioux Nation to relinquish the "entire reservation" given to them under the Fort Laramie Treaty. From most "congressional and pioneer views" this was the "easy and practical method" of securing the Blacks Hills.

S. 590 was approved by the Senate with a vote of thirty to eight, with language that implied that the commission could acquire the entire reservation and relocate the Sioux. In the House Committee on Indian Affairs, it was amended to specify that "nothing in this bill could be construed or twisted to allow for the removal of the Sioux Nation to Indian Territory." Peace efforts or "attempts to purchase the Blacks hills" could still proceed. Missourians praised the action since it would have kept the Sioux far from their borders.

However, after the Battle of the Little Big Horn public opinion turned against the Sioux and Congress refused to address the bill. When asked why, Congressman Omar D. Conger opined that Congress felt the need to "find out whether the Sioux have captured all our army before we go treating with them."

S. 590 went on to die in committee and Congress approved the Indian Appropriations Bill of 1876 instead. It "illegally denied the Sioux all further appropriation and treaty-guaranteed annuities" until they gave up the Black Hills.

== 20th century litigation of the Sioux claim for the Black Hills ==
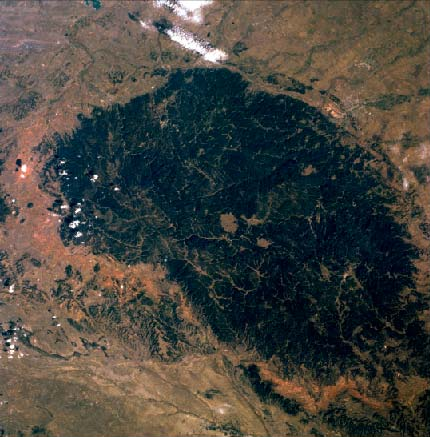
An image of the Black Hills taken from space

The Sioux never accepted the legitimacy of their forced deprivation of their Black Hills reservation. In 1920, lobbyists for the Sioux persuaded Congress to authorize a lawsuit against the United States in US Claims Court. The Sioux filed a petition in 1923, but the Claims Court dismissed the case in 1942, holding that the Court could not second guess whether their compensation under the 1877 Agreement reached by the Manypenny Commission – which served as the basis for the 1877 Act of Congress – was adequate. The Sioux (and many other tribes) continued lobbying Congress for a forum for their claims, and in 1946 Congress created an independent federal agency, the Indian Claims Commission, to "hear and determine all tribal grievances" including the Sioux claim.

The Sioux lost their first hearing before the Indian Claims Commission "due to the failings of their former counsel", but on appeal to the US Claims Court, the Court directed the Commission to take new evidence, which it did in 1958. Then ensued what the US Supreme Court called "a lengthy period of procedural sparring" from 1958 until 1972 – when the Commission ruled in favor of the Sioux, awarding damages for the deprivation of the land, but not interest. On appeal the Government did not contest the Commission's holding that it had "acquired the Black Hills through a course of unfair and dishonorable dealing for which the Sioux were entitled to damages." In effect, the Government was disputing only whether the Sioux could collect 100 years' worth of interest. The Claims Court ruled that its previous 1942 dismissal of the Sioux’s Fifth Amendment Taking case was res judicata (a case already decided), "whether rightly or wrongly", thus denying the opportunity to seek 100 years' worth of interest.

The case returned to the Indian Claims Commission to determine minor leftover issues about the value of rights-of-way and government offsets. In the meantime, in 1978 the Sioux lobbyists persuaded Congress to pass yet another law conferring authority on the Claims Court to hear the Sioux case, this time without regard to res judicata. That meant the Sioux could re-litigate the claim as a Fifth Amendment Taking, to collect 100 years' worth of interest. Finally, under its new authorizing statute, the Claims Court held the Sioux had suffered a Taking cognizable under the Fifth Amendment, and were entitled to the value of the land as of the 1877 taking which was $17.1 million, the value of gold prospectors illegally took out of the land computed at $450,000, and 100 years' worth of interest at 5% per year which would be an additional $88 million.

This Government appealed this decision, and the US Supreme Court granted its petition for certiorari.

== Supreme Court decision ==
Justice Blackmun delivered the Court's opinion in which six other justices joined. Justice White concurred in part, and Justice Rehnquist dissented.

The issue was whether the Sioux had already received just compensation for their land, and the Court affirmed the Claims Court's decision that they never had. The Court recognized a tension between Congress's duty to serve as a benevolent trustee for Indians, and the power to take their land. "Congress can own two hats, but it cannot wear them both at the same time," said the opinion. While reaffirming earlier decisions that Congress has "paramount authority over the property of the Indians," the Court concluded that Congress acts properly only if it "makes a good faith effort to give the Indians the full value of the land," which here it had failed to do. In conclusion the Supreme Court ordered "just compensation to the Sioux Nation, and that obligation, including an award of interest, must now, at last, be paid."

=== Dissent ===
Associate Justice William Rehnquist was the lone dissenter in this case. Rehnquist felt Congress overstepped the bounds of separation of powers by intruding upon the finality of a judicial decision when it "reviewed a prior decision of an Art. III court, eviscerated the finality of that judgment, and ordered a new trial in a pending case." Rehnquist also disagreed that the initial Court of Claims decision in 1942 was wrong. He endorsed the view that the Sioux already had been adequately compensated for their land. Rehnquist's dissent suggests that it is "quite unfair to judge by the light of 'revisionist' historians or the mores of another era actions that were taken under pressure of time more than a century ago."

== Response to the decision ==
The Sioux have declined to accept the money, because acceptance would legally terminate Sioux demands for return of the Black Hills. The money remains in a Bureau of Indian Affairs account accruing compound interest. As of 2011, the Sioux's award plus interest was "about $1 billion" or "1.3 billion" (equivalent to $1.43 to $1.86 billion in 2025).

In lieu of accepting the payment outlined by the Court, Sioux leaders created the Black Hills Steering Committee, a political group consisting of members from each Sioux tribe that coalesced around the shared goal of pressuring Congress to enact legislation that would reestablish Sioux sovereignty over the Black Hills territory. Under the leadership of Gerald Clifford, the designated coordinator of legislative efforts, Sioux representatives spent two years negotiating the exact terms of their demands. The final legislative draft written by the Steering Committee called for the creation of a new reservation within the same territory acquired by the United States in 1877 that once constituted the Great Sioux Reservation, and totaled an approximate 7.3 million acres (30000 km^{2}). However, the Sioux would only receive direct title over 1.2 million acres (5000 km^{2}) of federal land, as the State of South Dakota and private residents were permitted to retain ownership over their land. The legislation would also re-establish water and mineral rights to the Sioux in the reapportioned territory and restore tribal jurisdiction. It also included provisions that ensured the exemption of the territory under Sioux control from all federal, local, and state taxes.

The Steering Committee succeeded in bringing this legislation to Congress when Senator Bill Bradley of New Jersey signed on as a sponsor and introduced it on July 17, 1985. The new Sioux Nation Black Hills Act, or "Bradley Bill" as it was more commonly known, was staunchly opposed by the South Dakota delegation. The bill ultimately died in Congress without ever being brought up for a vote.

Bradley tried to reintroduce the legislation in 1987; however, internal political divisions amongst the representatives on the Black Hills Steering Committee diffused the momentum behind it. Steering Committee member Red Cloud proposed that the new legislative effort be led by Phil Stevens, a businessman from California who claimed Sioux ancestry, instead of Clifford. Stevens claimed that the Bradley Bill was not sufficient and demanded, in addition to the restoration of 1.3 million acres (5250 km^{2}) of territory, a sum of $3.1 billion in compensation and the guarantee of future rents on an additional 73 million acres (295 km^{2}) that were included in the original Treaty of 1868 at a value of one dollar per acre to be paid each year. Stevens' proposal earned him widespread support among many Sioux representatives. However, others in the Clifford camp were wary and criticized him for focusing too much on money rather than the return of Sioux land. Senator Bradley decided to hold back on the new bill until a resolution was reached for this internal dispute. Ultimately, Stevens proved unable to secure any congressional support behind his alternative proposal, and the momentum behind the initial push behind the Bradley Bill was lost.

== See also ==
- List of United States Supreme Court cases, volume 448
- Republic of Lakotah
- Black Hills land claim
