= New Mexico v. Mescalero Apache Tribe =

- Supreme Court of the United States

Argued April 19, 1983 Decided June 13, 1983
- Full case name: New Mexico, et al. v. Mescalero Apache Tribe
- Citations: 462 U.S. 324 (more) 103 S. Ct. 2378; 76 L. Ed. 2d 611; 1983 U.S. LEXIS 57

Case history
- Prior: Mescalero Apache Tribe v. State of New Mexico, 630 F.2d 724 (10th Cir. 1980)

Holding
- The application of New Mexico's laws to on-reservation hunting and fishing by nonmembers of the Tribe is preempted by the operation of federal law.

Court membership
- Chief Justice Warren E. Burger Associate Justices William J. Brennan Jr. · Byron White; Thurgood Marshall · Harry Blackmun; Lewis F. Powell Jr. · William Rehnquist; John P. Stevens · Sandra Day O'Connor

Case opinion
- Majority: Marshall, joined by unanimous

New Mexico v. Mescalero Apache Tribe, 462 U.S. 324 (1983), was a case in which the Supreme Court of the United States held that the application of New Mexico's laws to on-reservation hunting and fishing by nonmembers of the Tribe is preempted by the operation of federal law.

== Background ==
The Mescalero Apache Tribe is a Native American (Indian) tribe with a reservation in south- central New Mexico in the Rocky Mountains, generally south of Ruidoso and west of Tularosa. The current reservation was established by a series of Executive Orders, with the most recent dating from 1883. The tribe is governed by the Indian Reorganization Act, which provides for self-government of the tribe and reservation, subject to approval by the Secretary of the Interior.

The tribe's major source of income, lumber, was in decline and the tribe started looking at other sources of income. These included a casino resort complex, the Inn of the Mountain Gods, a ski resort, Ski Apache, and the development of fish and game resources. All of these programs provided revenue for the tribal government to provide services to tribal members. In the hunting and fishing areas, the tribe entered into a sustained collaborative effort with the United States Fish and Wildlife Service. This included creating eight lakes, stocking the lakes with fish, and having the federal government operate a hatchery on the reservation. The state was not involved in these efforts. The federal government also provided a herd of 142 elk, which the tribe's game management program has increased to 1,200. New Mexico was not involved in these efforts, nor in the other games on the reservation. The tribe and the federal government jointly conduct a fish and game management program. Every year the tribe adopts hunting and fishing ordinances based on the recommendations of the federal government. These ordinances are then approved by the Interior Secretary. The state of New Mexico also has hunting and fishing regulations.

The two sets of regulations are often in conflict as regards the hunting seasons, bag limits, and the fact that the tribe does not require a state license to hunt tribal lands, regardless of whether the individual is an Indian or non-Indian. In 1977, the New Mexico Department of Game and Fish began to enforce state game laws by arresting non-Indian hunters for illegal possession of game that was taken from the reservation in accordance with tribal laws, but that was not in compliance with state law.

=== Lower courts ===
The tribe then filed suit against the State of New Mexico in the United States District Court for the District of New Mexico to prevent New Mexico from enforcing state hunting and fishing regulations on the reservation. The District Court granted declaratory relief and granted the tribe an injunction preventing the state from enforcing its regulations. The state then appealed to the United States Court of Appeals for the Tenth Circuit, which affirmed the decision of the District Court.

The state appealed to the Supreme Court, which vacated the decision of the Tenth Circuit and remanded the case for reconsideration in view of the Supreme Court's decision in Montana v. United States, 450 U.S. 544 (1981). On remand, the Tenth Circuit again affirmed the decision of the District Court, which was a victory for the tribe. The state again appealed to the Supreme Court, which agreed to hear the appeal by granting certiorari.

== Opinion of the Court ==
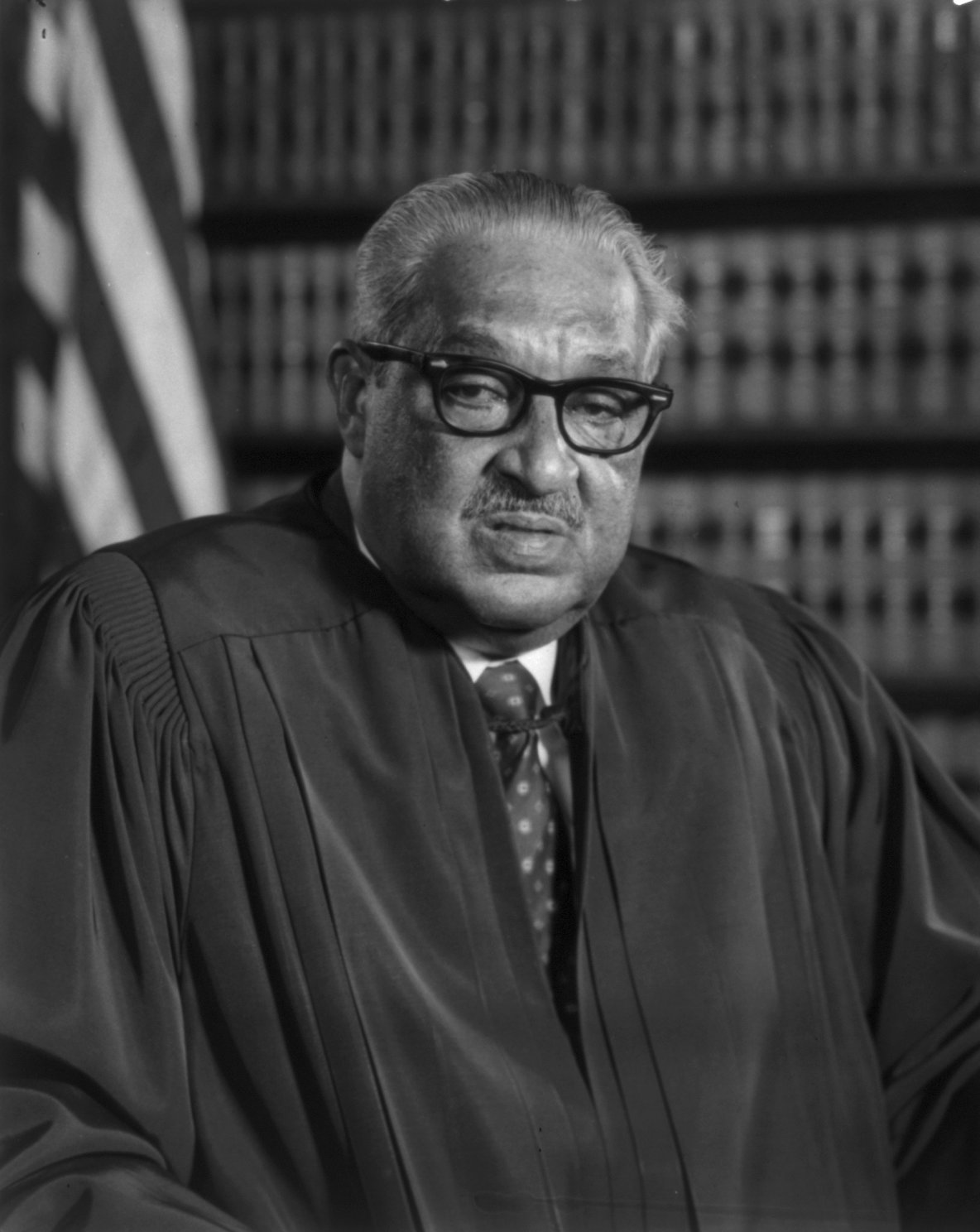
Justice Thurgood Marshall, author of the majority opinion

Justice Marshall delivered the opinion for a unanimous Court. Marshall first distinguished the case before the court from the facts and decision in Montana v. United States, noting that non-tribal lands were interspersed with tribal lands in the Montana case and that the ruling in that case turned on whether the Crow Tribe could regulate hunting that was within reservation boundaries but not on tribal land. He then discussed the concept of tribal sovereignty and its history from Worcester v. Georgia, 31 U.S. (6 Pet.) 515 (1832) to more modern decisions. Marshall noted that although there are some cases where a state may regulate non-Indians on a reservation, it may only do so if it is not preempted by federal law.

Marshall noted that New Mexico conceded that the tribe had the authority to regulate hunting and fishing for both tribal and non-tribal members on reservation land, but claimed concurrent jurisdiction over the non-tribal members. Marshall observed that Public Law 280 specifically granted tribes the authority to regulate on-reservation hunting and fishing, and made it a federal crime to enter a reservation to hunt or fish without the consent of the tribe. Marshall rejected the state's claim of concurrent jurisdiction, noting that the state could "effectively nullify" tribal authority. Based in large part on the BIA involvement with the tribe in establishing regulations, Marshall held that federal law preempted state law and affirmed the decision of the Tenth Circuit Court.
