= In the Matter of S--- =

United States Board of Immigration Appeals decision

In the Matter of S---, 1 I. & N. Dec. 309 (1942), is a United States Department of Justice Board of Immigration Appeals (BIA) decision holding that a white woman born in Canada married to a Canadian Indian and deemed a member of an Indian tribe under the Canadian Indian Act is an American Indian within the meaning of the Section 289 of the Immigration and Nationality Act (INA), and as such is entitled to pass the borders of the United States without regard to the INA.

== Facts and procedural posture ==
Three plaintiffs appeared before a board of special inquiry held in Montreal, Canada, for admission for indefinite residence to the United States, and two other plaintiffs applied at the port of Oroville, Wash., and another two in Van Buren, Me., for admission for indefinite residence. All claimed the right of entry to the United States without documents as an Indian, and each one of them was of white blood but made claim to Indian status under the provisions of the Canadian Indian Act and therefore the right to pass under the Act. The respective boards of special inquiry denied their claims to Indian status and excluded them on the grounds above stated by reason of their lack of passports and visas.

== Holding ==
The BIA overturned the lower tribunals. The Board noted that the Jay Treaty and the Treaty of Ghent put emphasis upon the terms "tribes or nations of Indians". Thus from the historical point of view it is tribal affiliation that determines Indian status, although the statute explicitly rejected affiliation by adoption. The court reasoned that the adoption exception was subject to application of the maxim expressio unius est exclusio alterius or in this instance, exclusio unius est expressio alterius. The adoption exception is thus read to mean that a tribal status may be acquired by marriage, which is harmonious with the historical emphasis upon tribal affiliation.

The Board did not feel there was any harm in using Canadian legislation to interpret the meaning of the relevant U.S. legislation:

Is there violence to legal precept in using the definition found in the Canadian Indian Act, that is, foreign legislation, as the guide to statutory construction? In this case we believe not. Here we are dealing with Canadian American Indians in an effort to preserve to them their ancient tribal rights. The Canadian Indian Act is a comprehensive definition of tribal governance. We note its comprehensiveness and assume that it is acceptable to the Indians as a recognition of their tribal customs and way of life.
