= United States v. Salvucci =

- Supreme Court of the United States

Argued March 26, 1980 Decided June 25, 1980
- Full case name: United States v. John Salvucci
- Citations: 448 U.S. 83 (more)

Case history
- Prior: UNITED STATES OF AMERICA, APPELLANT, v. JOHN M. SALVUCCI, JR., JOSEPH G. Zackular, 1979 United States Court of Appeals, First Circuit 599 F.2d at 1098
- Subsequent: Reversed and remanded

Holding
- Mere possession of a seized good during an illegal search does not automatically entitle a person to file a Fourth Amendment deprivation claim.

Court membership
- Chief Justice Warren E. Burger Associate Justices William J. Brennan Jr. · Potter Stewart; Byron White · Thurgood Marshall; Harry Blackmun · Lewis F. Powell Jr. William Rehnquist · John P. Stevens

Case opinions
- Majority: Rehnquist, joined by Burger, Stewart, White, Blackmun, Powell, Stevens
- Dissent: Marshall, joined by Brennan
- This case overturned a previous ruling or rulings
- Jones v. United States (1960)

United States v. Salvucci 448 U.S. 83 (1980) was a Supreme Court case ruling that "automatic standing" to file a Fourth Amendment claim based on mere possession of a seized item lacks constitutional merit.

== Background ==
In 1978, John Salvucci and Joseph Zackular were federally indicted on 12 counts of stolen mail possession. They filed a motion to suppress the checks during trial, arguing the affidavit supporting the search warrant lacked probable cause. The District Court agreed; the Court of Appeals upheld the suppression order based on the defendants' standing.

== Decision ==
In a 7-2 majority opinion delivered by Justice William Rehnquist, the Court ruled that simple possession of a seized item does not justify standing by itself. Instead, those who have "a legitimate expectation of privacy in the invaded place" possess merit to file a Fourth Amendment claim.

=== Marshall's Dissent ===
Justice Thurgood Marshall, joined by Justice Brennan, posits that the automatic standing rule eliminates the "wasteful" requirement of pretrial preliminary standing hearings in possession cases.
