= American Indian Philosophy Association =

The American Indian Philosophy Association (AIPA) is an organization whose purpose is to promote and further the study of philosophical issues that affect American Indigenous people.
