= List of United States Supreme Court cases, volume 448 =

This is a list of all the United States Supreme Court cases from volume 448 of the United States Reports:

Case name	Citation	Date decided
Maine v. Thiboutot	448 U.S. 1	1980
42 U.S.C. § 1983 allows suits for violations of federal statutory law.
Adams v. Texas	448 U.S. 38	1980
Ohio v. Roberts	448 U.S. 56	1980
United States v. Salvucci	448 U.S. 83	1980
Rawlings v. Kentucky	448 U.S. 98	1980
Maher v. Gagne	448 U.S. 122	1980
White Mountain Apache Tribe v. Bracker	448 U.S. 136	1980
Central Machinery Co. v. Arizona Tax Comm'n	448 U.S. 160	1980
Dawson Chemical Co. v. Rohm & Haas Co.	448 U.S. 176	1980
United States v. Ward	448 U.S. 242	1980
Thomas v. Washington Gas Light Co.	448 U.S. 261	1980
Harris v. McRae	448 U.S. 297	1980
Williams v. Zbaraz	448 U.S. 358	1980
United States v. Sioux Nation of Indians	448 U.S. 371	1980
Reid v. Georgia	448 U.S. 438	1980
Mabry v. Klimas	448 U.S. 444	1980
Fullilove v. Klutznick	448 U.S. 448	1980
Richmond Newspapers, Inc. v. Virginia	448 U.S. 555	1980
Industrial Union Dept., AFL-CIO v. American Petroleum Institute	448 U.S. 607	1980
Hammett v. Texas	448 U.S. 725	1980
Railway Labor Executives' Assn. v. Gibbons	448 U.S. 1301	1980
Rostker v. Goldberg	448 U.S. 1306	1980
In re Roche	448 U.S. 1312	1980
McDaniel v. Sanchez	448 U.S. 1318	1980
Willhauck v. Flanagan	448 U.S. 1323	1980
Certain Named and Unnamed Non-citizen Children v. Texas	448 U.S. 1327	1980
Moore v. Brown	448 U.S. 1335	1980
Gregory-Portland Independent School Dist. v. United States	448 U.S. 1342	1980
Board of Ed. of Los Angeles v. Superior Court of Cal., County of Los Angeles	448 U.S. 1343	1980
