= McClanahan v. Arizona State Tax Commission =

McClanahan v. Arizona State Tax Comm'n
- Supreme Court of the United States

Argued December 12, 1972 Decided March 27, 1973
- Full case name: McClanahan v. Arizona State Tax Commission
- Citations: 411 U.S. 164 (more) 93 S. Ct. 1257; 36 L. Ed. 2d 129; 1973 U.S. LEXIS 89

Case history
- Prior: McClanahan v. State Tax Commission, 484 P.2d 221 (Ariz. App. Div. 1 1971).

Holding
- Arizona has no jurisdiction to impose a tax on the income of Navajo Indians residing on the Navajo Reservation and whose income is wholly derived from reservation sources.

Court membership
- Chief Justice Warren E. Burger Associate Justices William O. Douglas · William J. Brennan Jr. Potter Stewart · Byron White; Thurgood Marshall · Harry Blackmun; Lewis F. Powell Jr. · William Rehnquist

Case opinion
- Majority: Marshall, joined by unanimous

Laws applied
- Treaty with the Navajo Indians, 15 Stat. 667; Buck Act, 4 U.S.C. § 104 et seq.; Ariz. Rev. Stat. Ann. §43-102(a)

McClanahan v. Arizona State Tax Comm'n, 411 U.S. 164 (1973), was a case in which the Supreme Court of the United States holding that Arizona has no jurisdiction to impose a tax on the income of Navajo Indians residing on the Navajo Reservation if their income is wholly derived from reservation sources.

== Background ==
Lower Courts

Rosalind McClanahan was an enrolled member of the Navajo Nation in Arizona. In 1967, all of her income came from work on the Navajo Reservation; $16.20 was withheld from her wages. She requested a refund of the entire amount and protested the collection of state taxes. When the state declined her claim, she filed an action in the Arizona Superior Court. The court dismissed her case for failure to state a claim. McClanahan appealed to the Arizona Court of Appeals, which affirmed. The Arizona Supreme Court declined to hear the case, and the United States Supreme Court granted certiorari to hear the case.

History of Navajo Sovereignty

For the history of the Government, see Navajo Nation.

The Navajo Nation has a modern history of being very self established within the United States federal recognition system. The Navajo Nation has its own government, education and healthcare programs, and its own police system in place. In 1868 the Navajo Nation and the United States signed the Navajo Nation Treaty of 1868, which detailed the agreement between the two of reservation boundaries and rights of the Navajo Nation. Later on in 1922, The U.S. Secretary of the Interior created the Navajo Business Council for the purpose of being able to obtain mineral leases.

Prior to this court case, the Navajo Nation had a government to government relationship with the United States government.

United States Code on Taxation

The United States Code is the collection of all the laws published by the US House of Representatives that was started in 1926. In 1947 Title 4 Chapter 4 was made for laying out the framework for states authority, jurisdiction and taxation. In section 109 (Same; exception of Indians), it explicitly mentions in regard to the prior sections 105 and 106 that were discussing taxation rules:

Nothing in sections 105 and 106 of this title shall be deemed to authorize the levy or collection of any tax on or from any Indian not otherwise taxed.

This was the precedence set by the US House of Representatives 21 years prior to the case and was later used in the Supreme court hearing of the case.

== Decision ==
Justice Thurgood Marshall delivered the opinion of a unanimous court. He found that there was nothing in federal law that authorized Arizona to collect a state income tax from an Indian that earned the income on the reservation. The case was reversed.

An important quote that is cited in many future cases from this one from Justice Thurgood Marshall is:

"It must always be remembered that the various Indian tribes were once independent and sovereign nations, and that their claim to sovereignty long predates that of our own Government."

This holds the implication that various Indian tribes' claims and rulings were standing long before the United States claims and rulings.

== Legacy ==
This case was a foundational supreme court case for the rights of Native Americans. This case was later cited in 638 other court cases. These court cases range from the topics of:

- Tribal Tax Cases
- Tribal Sovereignty Cases
- Federal Jurisdiction Cases
- Treaty Right Case

A recent example of this case being cited would be in the 2024 case of Lexington Ins. Co. v. Smith, where Lexington Insurance Company claimed that the Suquamish Tribe wasn't responsible for the insurance claim submitted by the tribe, and then was sued by the Tribal in tribal court. Lexington challenged the Tribe stating that the tribal court didn't have jurisdiction. The case was cited in this court case and ended up favoring the Suquamish Tribe by confirming that the tribal court had jurisdiction on the case.
