= Guilford Native American Association =

The Guilford Native American Association (GNAA) is a Native American community association in Guilford County, North Carolina. It is a North Carolina State-recognized American Indian Organization, and is a United Way referral agency.

Incorporated in September 1975 by local parents as a non-profit education advocacy group, the association has grown to encompass child care, employment, and age-based community programs. It is the oldest American Indian urban association in North Carolina and one of the oldest organizations of its kind in the United States.

Its stated primary goal is to "assist Indian people in achieving social and economic self-sufficiency". It serves over 5,000 Native Americans in Guilford and the surrounding counties. One of its major events since 1976 is an annual pow-wow and cultural festival. The association also operates the Guilford Native American Art Gallery in Greensboro, North Carolina.
