= Washington v. Confederated Bands and Tribes of the Yakima Indian Nation =

- Supreme Court of the United States

Argued October 2, 1978 Decided January 16, 1979
- Full case name: Washington v. Confederated Bands and Tribes of the Yakima Indian Nation
- Citations: 439 U.S. 463 (more) 99 S. Ct. 740; 58 L. Ed. 2d 740; 1979 U.S. LEXIS 55

Case history
- Prior: 552 F.2d 1332
- Subsequent: 608 F.2d 750

Holding
- The State of Washington's imposition of partial jurisdiction over certain actions on an Indian reservation, when not requested by the tribe, was valid under Public Law 280.

Court membership
- Chief Justice Warren E. Burger Associate Justices William J. Brennan Jr. · Potter Stewart; Byron White · Thurgood Marshall; Harry Blackmun · Lewis F. Powell Jr. William Rehnquist · John P. Stevens

Case opinions
- Majority: Stewart, joined by Burger, White, Blackmun, Powell, Rehnquist, Stevens
- Dissent: Marshall, joined by Brennan

Laws applied
- Pub. L. 83–280

Washington v. Confederated Bands and Tribes of the Yakima Indian Nation, 439 U.S. 463 (1979), was a case in which the Supreme Court of the United States held that the State of Washington's imposition of partial jurisdiction over certain actions on an Indian reservation, when not requested by the tribe, was valid under Public Law 280.

== Background ==
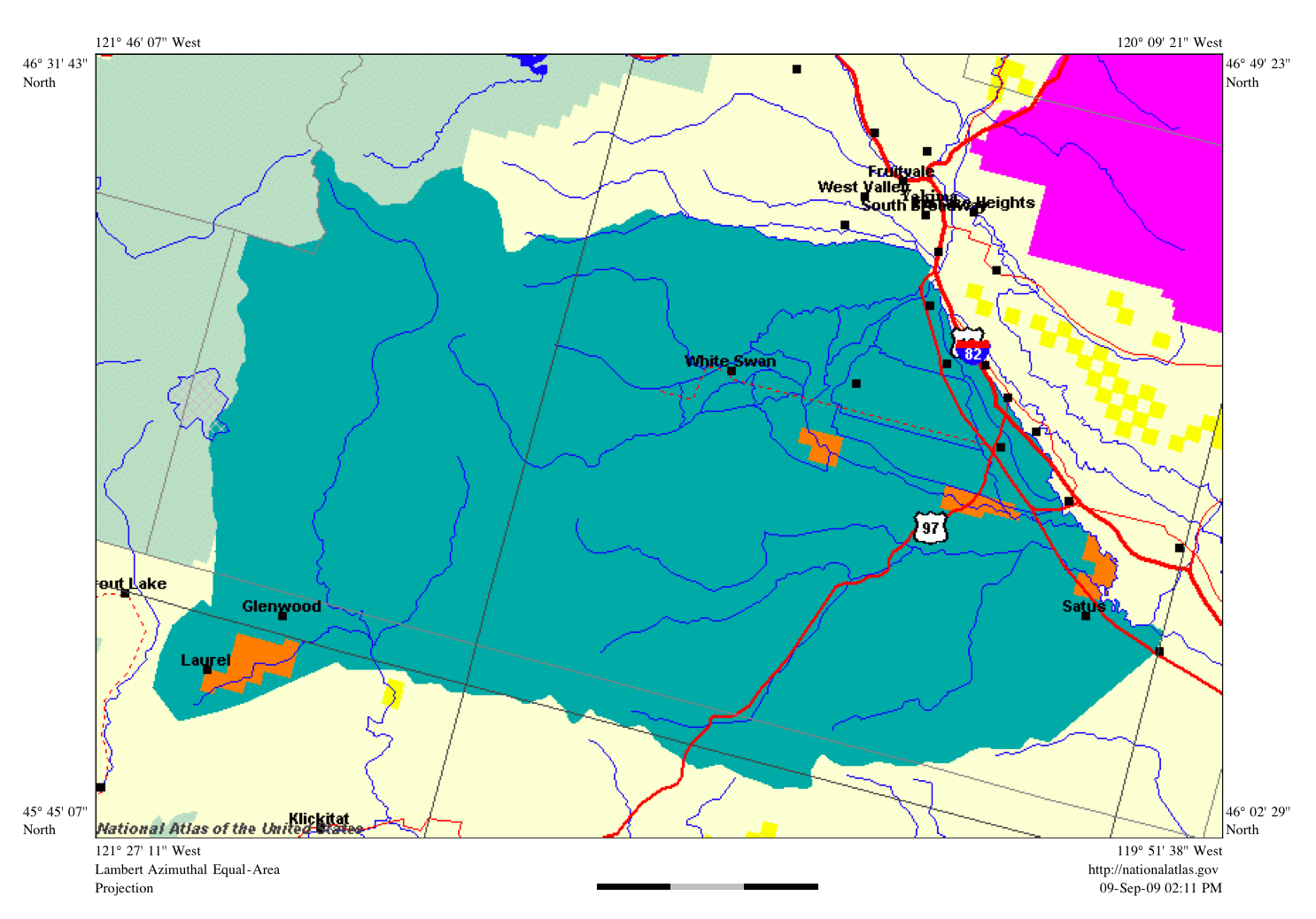
Yakama Indian Reservation map

The Yakama Nation is an Indian tribe with its reservation in southern Washington. (Note: In 1994, the spelling of the tribe's name was changed from Yakima to Yakama to reflect the name used in the treaty between the confederation of tribes and the U.S. The state still spells the city and county as Yakima.) The tribe comprises 14 distinct Indian tribes that the U.S. banded together in the 1850s for the purpose of treaty making. The current treaty was ratified by the Senate in 1859, under this treaty the tribe reserved to itself 1,387,505 acres (561,503 ha; 2,167.977 sq mi) for its reservation, as well as the right to exercise certain reserved rights on ceded lands and usual and accustomed locations. The reservation has tribal land and land held in fee. The fee land is owned by both tribal members and non-Indians, and tribal members are outnumbered greatly by non-Indians.

Public Law 280 transferred law enforcement authority from the federal government to state law enforcement in six states, (Note: Alaska, California, Minnesota, Nebraska, Oregon, and Wisconsin) and other states were allowed to assume criminal jurisdiction if the affected Indian (Native American) tribe gave its consent. The idea was to divest the tribes of jurisdiction in matters that were "deemed to be outside their competence". In 1963, the state of Washington enacted a statute to assume such jurisdiction. This statute provided that the state would only assume criminal jurisdiction with a tribe's consent, with eight exceptions. (Note: The exceptions were compulsory school attendance, public assistance, domestic relations, mental illness, juvenile delinquency, adoption proceedings, dependent children, and motor vehicle operations.) The tribe did not consent to the state assuming criminal jurisdiction, and objected to being subject to the eight listed exceptions.

The tribe then filed suit in U.S. District Court seeking relief from the enforcement of the eight exceptions. The District Court rejected the tribe's claims and entered judgment for the state. The tribe then appealed to the Court of Appeals for the Ninth Circuit. After the original three judge panel heard oral arguments, the Court of Appeals decided sua sponte to hear the case en banc, on the limited question of whether the state could assume partial jurisdiction. The court found that there was no prohibition on the state assuming partial jurisdiction and referred the remainder of the case to the original three-judge panel.

The panel of the Court of Appeals found that the "checkerboard jurisdictional system" violated the Equal Protection Clause of the Fourteenth Amendment. The court found no way to separate the offending portion of the statute and declared the entirety of the state law unconstitutional. The state then appealed to the U.S. Supreme Court, which granted certiorari and requested that the parties brief the court on the issues of partial geographic and subject matter jurisdiction as well as the Equal Protection Clause.

== Arguments ==
The Yakama tribe argued first that the Washington state constitution did not allow the state to assume jurisdiction over Indians without a constitutional amendment. On becoming a state, Washington disclaimed any jurisdiction over Indian lands. Both the tribe and the United States, as amicus curiae argued that to be able to apply Public Law 280, the state had to amend their constitution to assume jurisdiction. The state argued that the state legislature, in passing Chapter 36, had complied with the requirements of federal law to assume jurisdiction.

The tribe also argued that since partial jurisdiction was not specifically authorized by Public Law 280, it was not authorized at all. The fact that the states that were mandated to assume criminal jurisdiction also had to assume civil jurisdiction throughout the Indian lands in those states. The tribe reasoned that the states that assumed jurisdiction voluntarily also had to assume total jurisdiction or none at all. The United States argued that the law was passed in order reduce federal monetary burdens, to enhance law enforcement protection for Indians, and to provide for assimilation of Indians into general society.

Finally, the tribe argued that the "checkerboard" violated the Equal Protection Clause of the Fourteenth Amendment, claiming that the classifications in Chapter 36 were racial ones and as such, suspect under McLaughlin v. Florida, 379 U.S. 184 (1964).

== Decision ==
=== Majority opinion ===
Justice Potter Stewart delivered the opinion of the court. He dismissed the first argument, noting that the Enabling Act that made Washington a state merely required the consent of the United States and that Public Law 280 explicitly provided that consent was given provided that a state either amended their constitution or passed a statute to enable jurisdiction in Indian lands. The court ruled in favor of the state on that argument.

He agreed with a portion of the United States' second argument, that the law was passed for monetary burdens, tribal law enforcement protection, and assimilation. He stated that it was clear both from the legislative record and cited Bryan v. Itasca County, 426 U.S. 373 (1976) in support but then pointed out that the tribe's argument failed based on the reading of the law. An opt-in state, like Washington, which assumes partial jurisdiction, is nonetheless required by the statute to assume full jurisdiction upon the request of the tribe. He stated that the partial jurisdiction still left room for tribal self-government and reflected an attempt to accommodate the needs of both the tribe and the state. The court denied the second argument.

The court also ruled against the tribe on their third argument, reversing the decision of the Ninth Circuit Court. Stewart noted that in dealing with Indian tribes that the federal government was able to enact "legislation that might otherwise be constitutionally offensive," citing Morton v. Mancari, 417 U.S. 535 (1974). While states do not have the same relationship with Indian tribes, Chapter 36 was enacted in specific response to a federal law that was designed to change the jurisdiction over the tribes. Thus, Chapter 36 did not violate the Equal Protection Clause.

=== Dissenting opinion ===
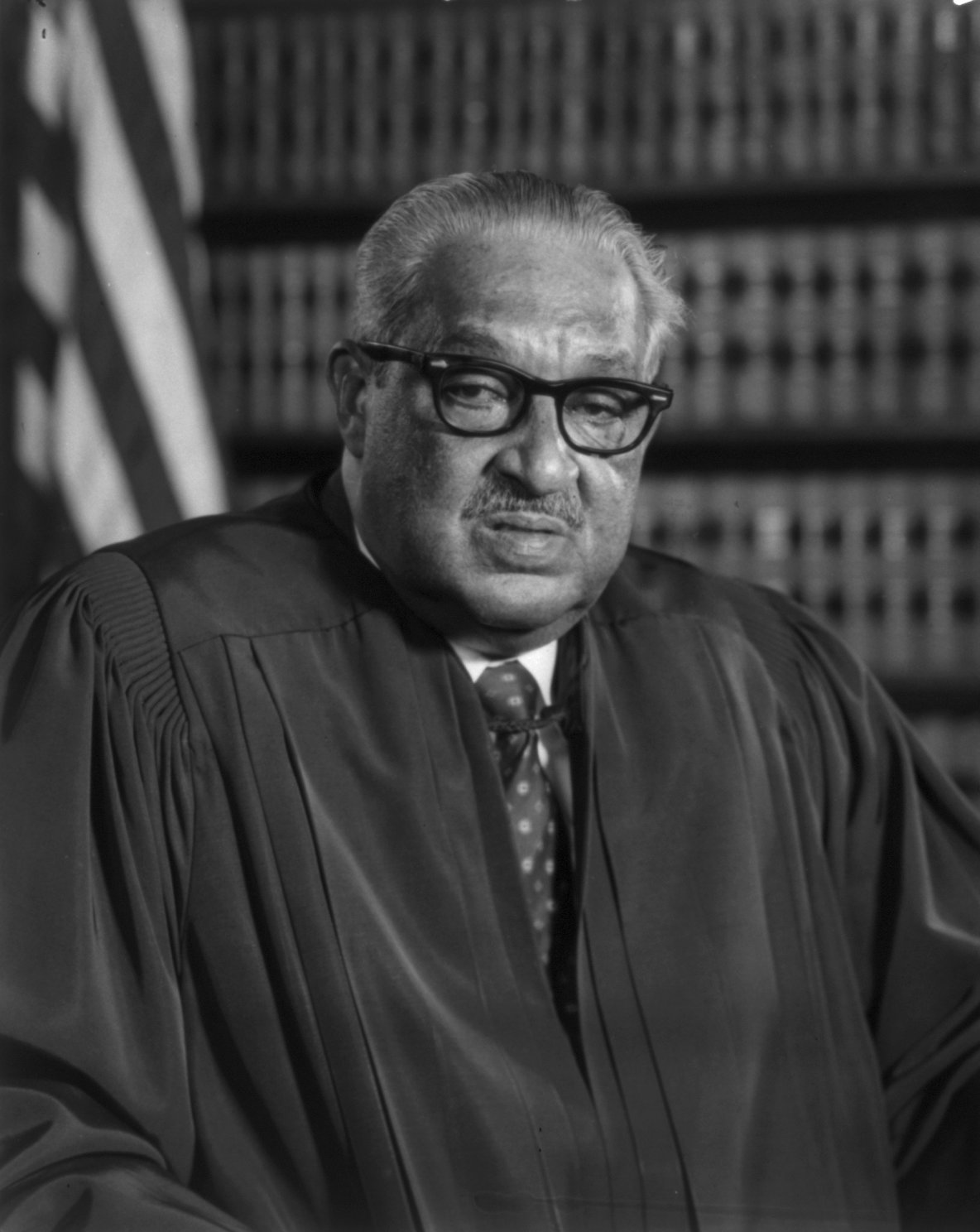
Justice Marshall, author of the dissenting opinion

Justice Thurgood Marshall, joined by Justice William Brennan, dissented. Marshall noted that for over 140 years, the Supreme Court had decided that any statutory construction must be resolved in favor of the Indian tribe. In this case, the ambiguities in the law were resolved in favor of the state, instead of the tribe. He would have affirmed the decision of the Ninth Circuit Court.

== See also ==
- United States v. Winans
- Pocket Veto Case
