= Alberto Rey =

American artist and filmmaker

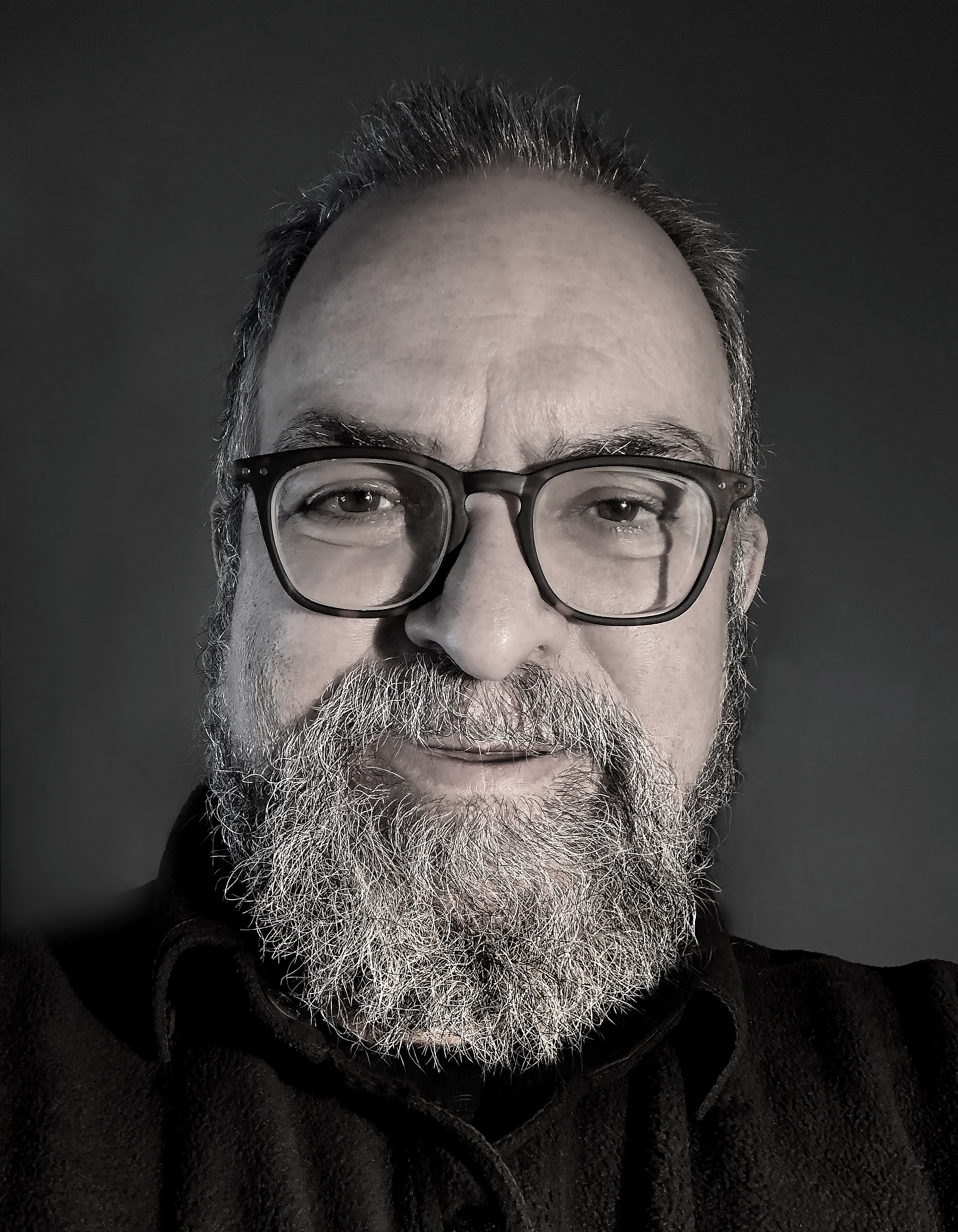
- Born: August 7, 1960 (age 66); Havana, Cuba
- Occupations: Artist and filmmaker
- Years active: 1988–present
- Spouse: Janeil Strong (married 1989–present)

Alberto Rey (born 7 August 1960) is a Cuban-American painter, illustrator, and filmmaker whose work explores bicultural identity, environmental conservation, and natural history. His art is held in several permanent collections, including the Bronx Museum of the Arts, the Brooklyn Museum, El Museo del Barrio, and the Museum of Latin American Art.

Rey is a distinguished professor emeritus at the State University of New York at Fredonia. In 2012, he was inducted into the Burchfield Penney Art Center's Living Legacy Project. He is also a conservationist and angler who founded a regional youth fly-fishing program and has contributed illustrations to fishing journals.

== Early life and education ==
Rey was born in Agramonte, Cuba, in 1960 to a criollo family. In 1963, his parents brought him to Mexico seeking political asylum before relocating to Little Havana in Miami, Florida, in 1965 and settling in Barnesboro, Pennsylvania, in 1967. His father, who held a doctorate in mathematics from the University of Havana, worked as a Spanish teacher. As a child, Rey developed an interest in art by copying album covers and drawings from Mad magazine.

Rey attended the Art Institute of Pittsburgh before earning a Bachelor of Fine Arts from Indiana University of Pennsylvania in 1982. He completed a Master of Fine Arts in drawing and painting at the University at Buffalo in 1987.

== Career ==
His abstract period of work from 1982 to 1992 involved layering Cuban iconography with his American experiences, symbolizing the struggles of fleeting memories and the romanticization of cultural identity.

In 1982, Rey returned to Miami and assisted with the Surrounded Islands Project by Christo and Jeanne-Claude, an environmental art installation that surrounded eleven islands with pink fabric for two weeks. That same year, the Burchfield Penney Art Center inducted his mixed-media work "Holy Angels Church and Chair" into its permanent collection.

In 1988, Rey began teaching at high schools and colleges while taking classes in contemporary art and environmental studies at Harvard University. Soon after, Rey's work was acquired by El Museo del Barrio's permanent collection, and he held his first solo New York City exhibition at the Museum of Contemporary Hispanic Art.

Rey relocated to Fredonia, New York, in 1989 to become a professor at the State University of New York. He was later named a SUNY Distinguished Professor for Research and Creativity in 2007.

From 1992 to 1999, Rey's work became being perceived as more representational as he investigated his Cuban culture, including its religion, food, politics, and relationship to American society. In 1991, the Burchfield Penney Arts Center collected a second painting by Rey entitled "Binary Forms: Floating Between." By 1992, his work had entered the collections of several major museums, including the Brooklyn Museum of Art ("Las Palmas Son Novias Que Esperan (The Palms Are Lovers Who Wait)"), the Bronx Museum of Art, and the Albright-Knox Art Gallery ("Binary Forms: XXI" and "Post-nuptial Gold: Time").

In 1996, Rey became curator and director of the Chautauqua Institution's Center of the Visual Arts.

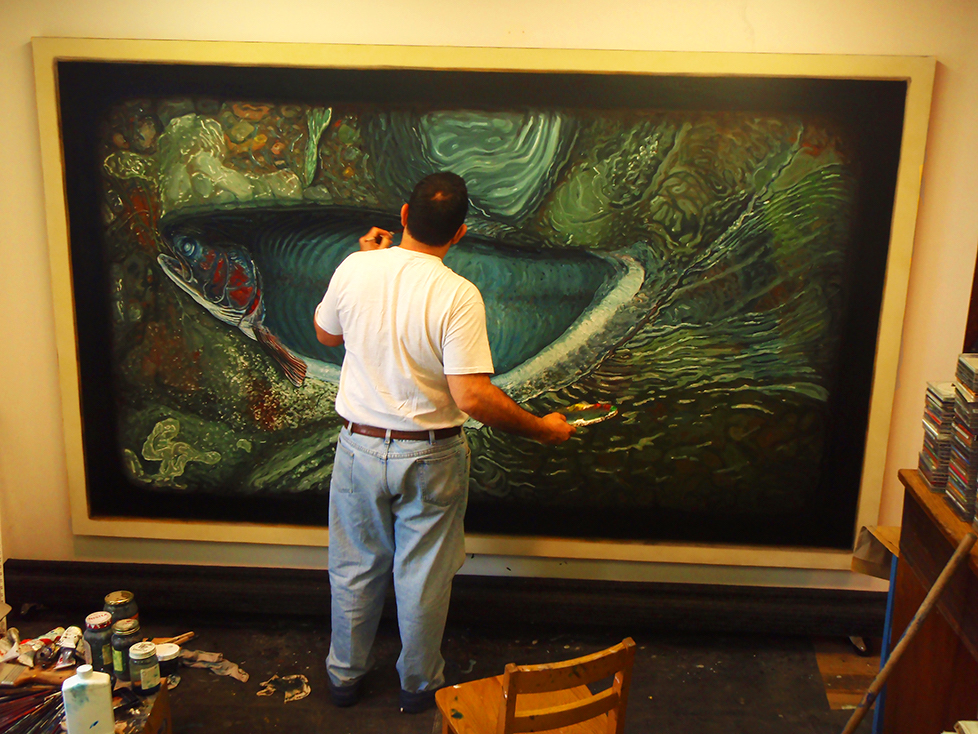
Alberto Rey working on a painting in his Fredonia, NY barn studio.

After 1999, an increased interest in art history, ecology, and environmental conservation led Rey to incorporate greater environmental realism into his work, as seen in his series "Biological Regionalism", which was later exhibited in 2014 at the Burchfield Penney Art Center. From 2000 to the present, his work has explored the history of angling art, environmentalism, urban migration, and biology.

Rey is the founder and director of the Children in the Stream Youth Fly Fishing Program, which provides children with education in environmental conservation. In 2006, Rey founded the Canadaway Creek Conservation Project, an annual stream clean-up initiative; he also established the Brook Trout Restoration Project, which teaches low- and middle-income children how to reintroduce brook trout into local waterways.

In 2022, in partnership with the Native American Fish and Wildlife Society, Rey and designer Jason Dilworth created a publication capturing a week-long summer youth practicum in Colorado. The program brought together high school students from nine tribes for leadership, outdoor learning, and cultural activities. Rey taught drawing, stream biology, and fly fishing.

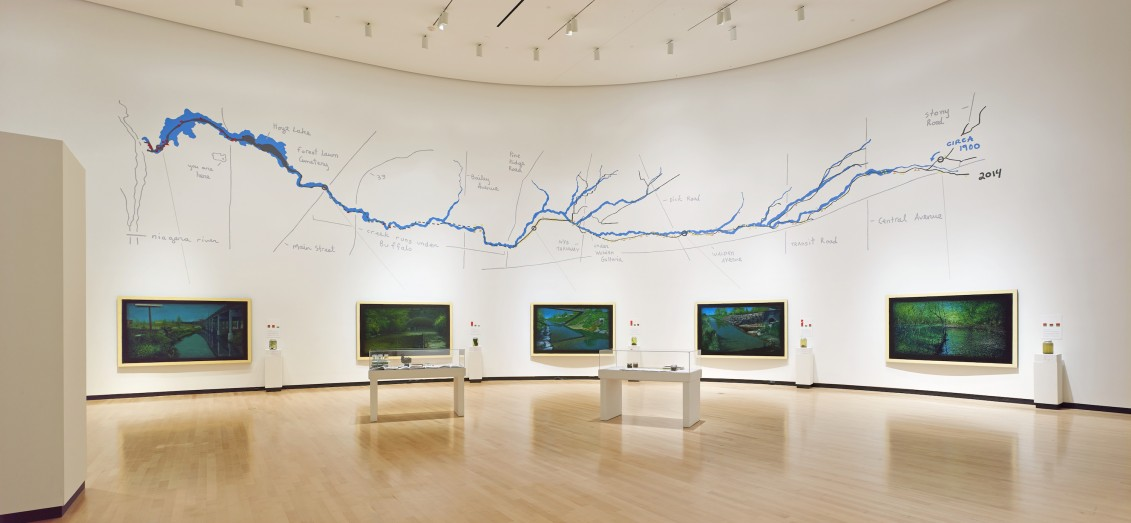
Installation of Alberto Rey's "Biological Regionalism" at the Burchfield-Penney Art Center in 2014.

Rey's art has been featured in more than 200 exhibitions.

== Works ==
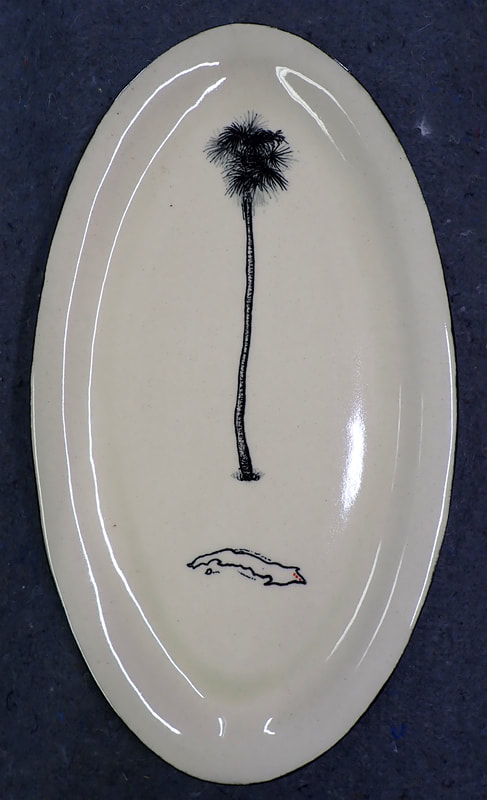
Alberto Rey, "Coccothrinax alexandri subsp. alexandri," black underglaze over 182G clay with clear glaze, 2021.

ATLAS: Historical Work and Recent Journeys of Alberto Rey (2024–25)

In 2025, Rey presented more than 130 paintings and sketchbooks in his installation "ATLAS" at the Marion Art Gallery at SUNY Fredonia. The work was inspired by his five-month journey around the world. "ATLAS" marked Rey's first exhibition after retiring as a distinguished professor at the institution. The show also included dozens of works spanning his career from 1992 to 2022.

Critical Endangered Palms of Cuba (2021-2022)

Inspired by Paul Craft's catalog "The Palms of Cuba," this series examines endangered palm species threatened by erosion, agricultural, and natural disasters. The works combine ceramic forms with mapped species locations, continuing Rey's conservation-focused engagement with Cuban landscapes.

Canadaway Creek - Western New York (2021)

A collaborative project with SUNY Fredonia faculty, students, and community members, and supported by the Costello Interplay Award for Science and the Arts, this book documents the Canadaway Creek's history, ecology, and environmental challenges while promoting local environmental stewardship.

=== Lost Beauty Project (since 2019) ===
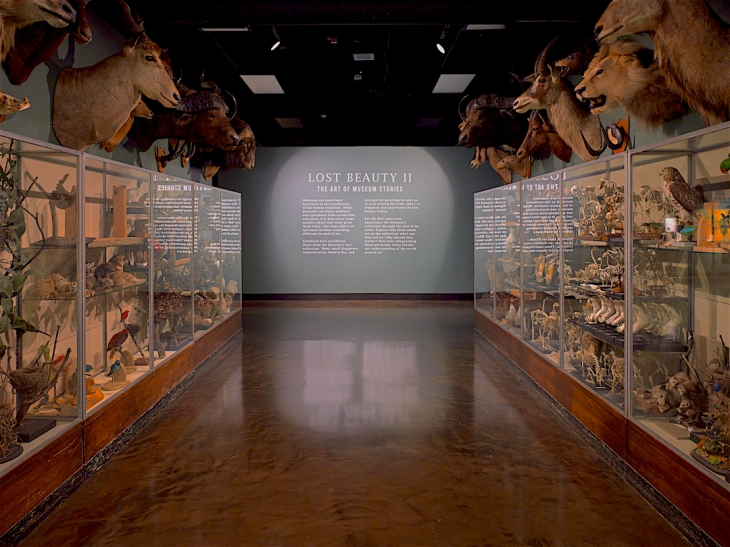
Installation shot of Alberto Rey's exhibit "Lost Beauty II" at the Buffalo Museum of Science, 2021.

Rey's Lost Beauty project documents fragile natural and cultural environments affected by climate change and human intervention. Part I, presented in collaboration with the Buffalo Museum of Science at the Anderson Gallery, University at Buffalo, in fall 2019, combined paintings and ceramics with audio, video, and scientific specimens from Rey's Extinct Birds Project, documenting the histories of 18 extinct bird species.

The Icebergs series focuses on Iceland's Jökulsárlón glacial region and was published as a book in 2021; works from the series were exhibited in Life Streams: Alberto Rey, Cuban-American Artist at the Ogunquit Museum of American Art. In 2021, Rey also became the first artist commissioned by the Buffalo Museum of Science, creating a site-specific exhibition pairing large-scale paintings with previously unseen museum artifacts.

Extinct Birds Project (2016-2019)

In 2018, Rey published Extinct Birds Project, documenting the histories of 17 extinct bird species represented by specimens held at the Roger Tory Institute of Natural History and Harvard University's Museum of Comparative Zoology. The accompanying exhibition opened in August 2018 at the Roger Tory Institute, featuring paintings alongside rare archival audio and video materials.

The project later formed the basis of Rey's Lost Beauty exhibitions, developed in collaboration with the Buffalo Museum of Science and the Anderson Gallery, University at Buffalo, beginning in 2019 and continuing with a site-specific installation at the Buffalo Museum of Science in 2021.

=== Biological Regionalism (since 2005) ===
Rey's Biological Regionalism series examines local aquatic ecosystems, combining art with scientific data to promote environmental awareness and conservation. Influenced by naturalist artists such as Winslow Homer and John James Audubon, the project integrates paintings and video with field research, maps, and environmental samples to explore natural beauty and human impact on aquatic environments. Rey's most recent installation, Biological Regionalism: Niagara River, was displayed at the Castellani Art Museum in 2023. In large-scale paintings, he explored the complex past of the Niagara River, from pollution to the Underground Railroad to Native American heritage.

Other major installations in this series include:

- Battenkill, Vermont, USA (2021-2023) at the Elizabeth de C. Wilson Museum, Southern Vermont Art Center
- Oswego River and Lake Ontario, Central New York, USA (2019-2022) at SUNY Oswego's Tyler Gallery
- Scajaquada Creek (2014) at the Burchfield Penney Art Center
- Ellicott Creek (2010) at the University at Buffalo Art Gallery

=== Bagmati River Art Project Series (2014–2016) ===
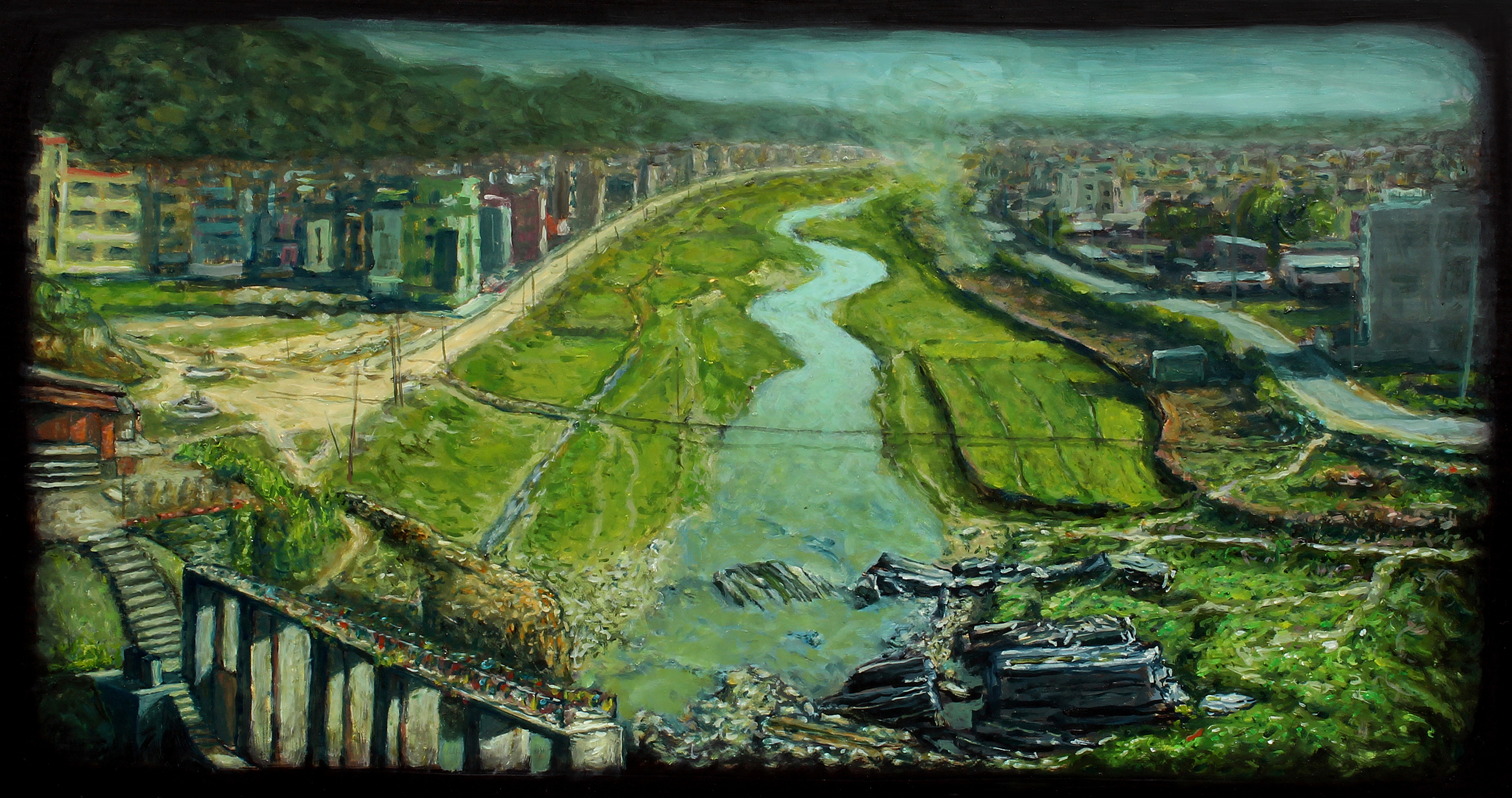
Alberto Rey, "Bagmati River flowing into Kathmandu, Nepal", oil on board, 2014.

In 2016, Rey wrote and illustrated a book about his project in Kathmandu, Nepal, titled Complexities of Water: Biological Regionalism: Bagmati River, Kathmandu Valley, Nepal, with SUNY Fredonia colleague and graphic designer Jason Dilworth. The project's exhibition opened on 20 November at the Siddhartha Art Gallery at Barbar Mahal Revisited in Kathmandu, featuring fourteen paintings, water samples, the documentary "BAGMATI", and artwork by Nepalese artists. The project also collected scientific data on water quality, pollution, human impact, climate change, and strategies to improve the health of the Bagmati river, while informing neighboring communities about conservation methods.

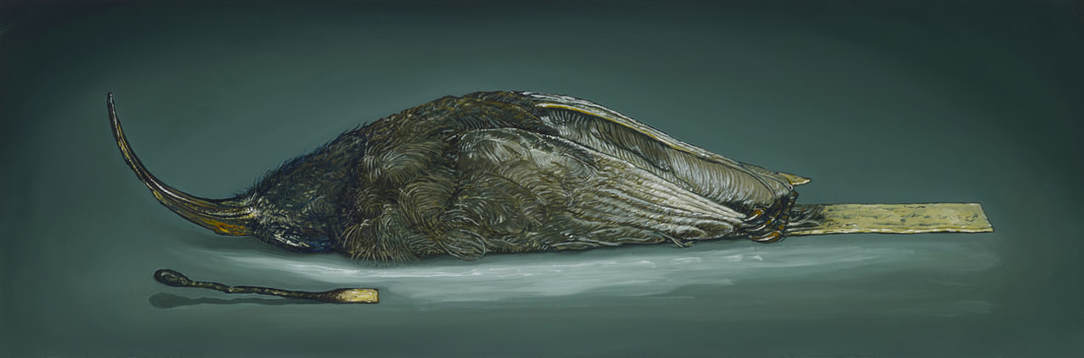
Alberto Rey, "Black Mamo", oil on board, 2019.

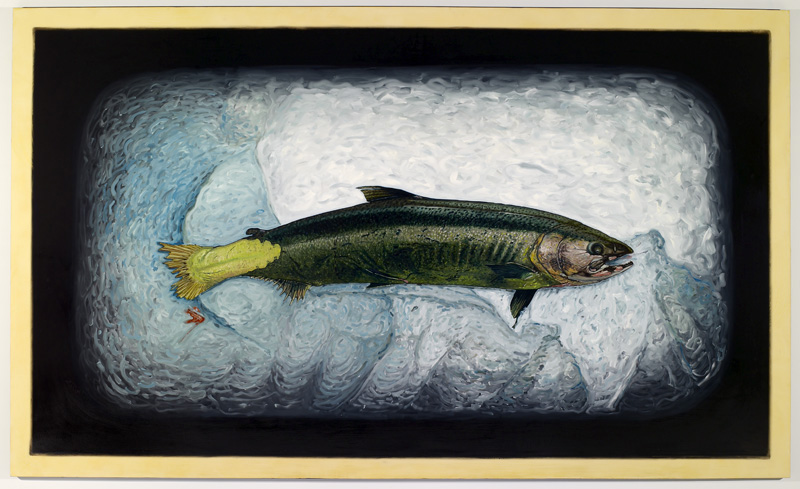
Alberto Rey, "Aesthetics of Death: VII", oil on board, 2014

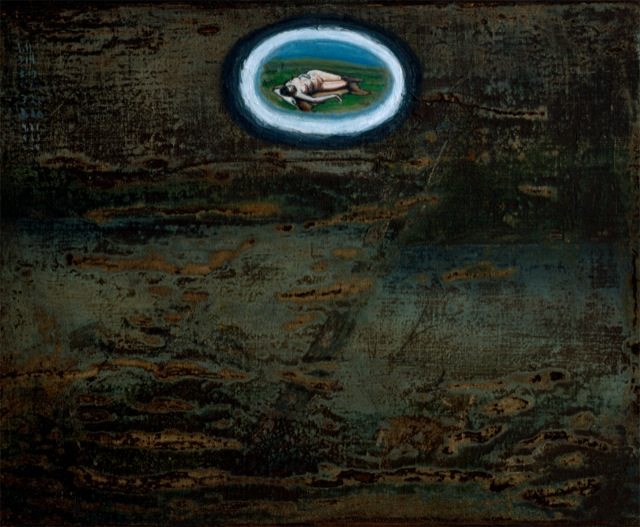
Alberto Rey, "Studio Retablos: Mexican Figure," oil on board, 1999.

=== The Aesthetics of Death Series (2006–2016) ===
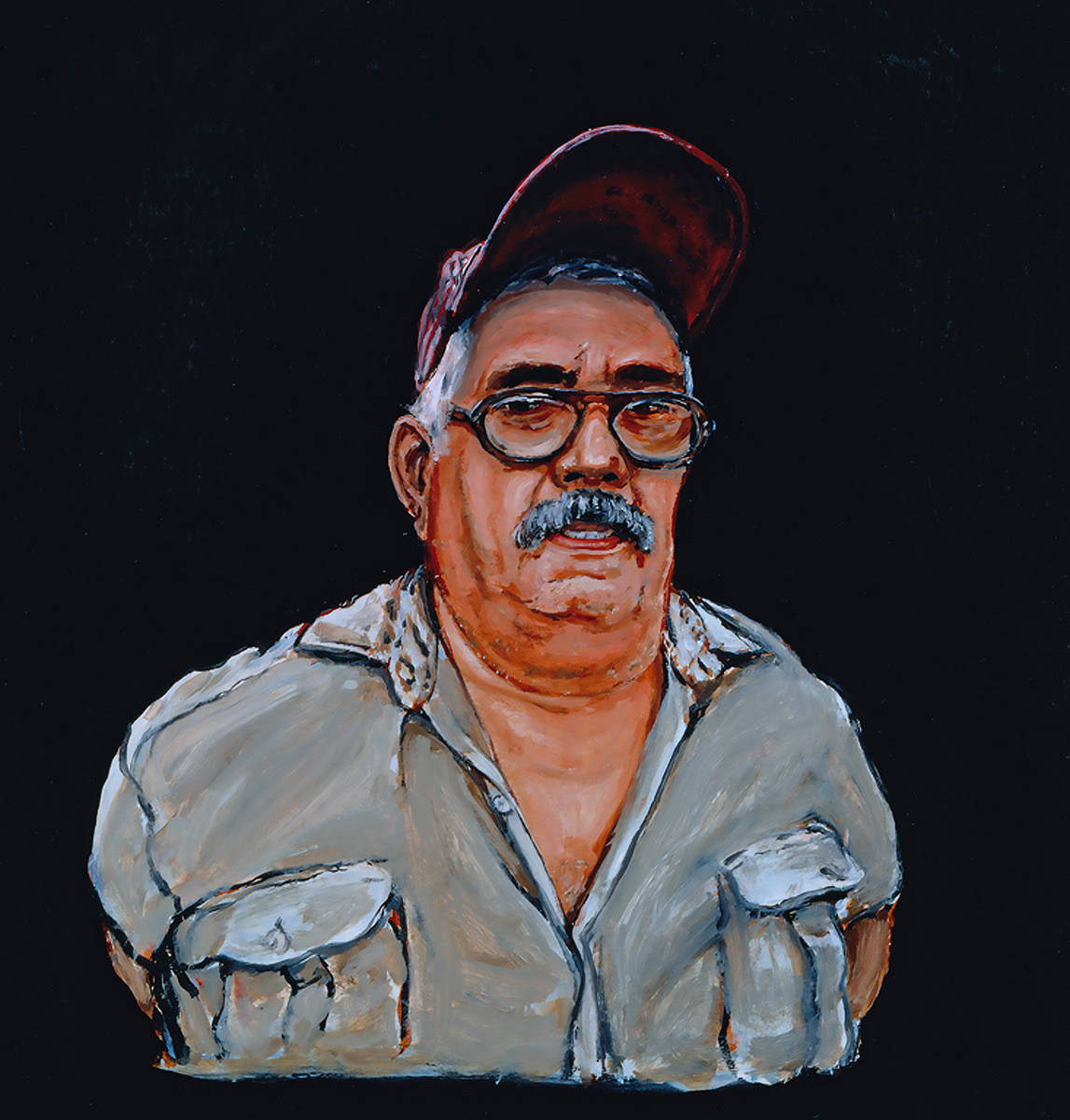
Alberto Rey, "Cuban Portraits: Alberto, Agramonte, Cuba", oils on plaster, 1999.

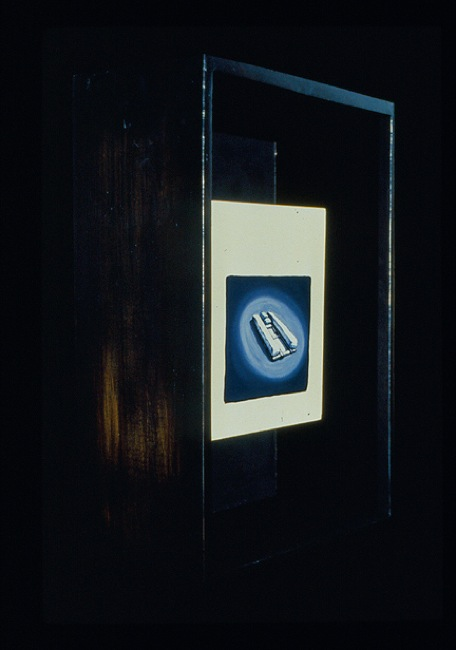
Alberto Rey, "Las Balsas XII", oil painting in handmade shadowbox frame, 1998.

Moved by the passing of his sister, Mayda, and his father-in-law, Neil Strong, Rey's series confronted death directly by depicting sick, dying, and deceased steelhead fish. The paintings themselves used bright colors and gestural brushwork to contrast the starkness of death with the temporary brilliance of life. The viewers look down at the fish from above against a flat, muted background, highlighting the overall shape of the subject. Though the life of a dead fish may initially seem insignificant to a viewer, the large scale of the paintings turns each fish into a monument, capturing an unrepeatable moment for future study, appreciation, and contemplation.

=== Trout Encounters Series (2000–2004) ===
Returning to the United States after visiting Cuba in 1998 for the first time in over 30 years signaled a thematic change for Rey, creating work that investigated other aspects of his identity beyond his Cuban heritage, including his passion for environmental conservation and researching art history. Akin to the Hudson River School artists who presented the general public with sweeping landscapes and depictions of wilderness, Rey's Trout Encounters brought together two worlds: the underwater world of regionally-specific trout species and the increasingly urbanized communities of people disconnected from their surroundings.

=== Studio Retablos Series (1998–2000) ===
This series combines several disciplines including the art history of America, Italy, Mexico, and Spain, as well as biology, pop culture, postmodernism, and politics. As he traveled for the previous 25 years collecting imagery and discarded paintings by amateur artists, Rey wanted to give these abandoned works new life. This series revitalized the old paintings by removing layers of their original paint and adding new layers of imagery from Rey's travels.

=== Cuban Portraits Series (1998–1999) ===
Rey described the inspiration behind the series as the Mexican portrait painter Hermenegildo Bustos (1832 – 1907) as Bustos portraits visually cataloged an ethnic group people in a moment of their history. Rey's series depicts both Cubans living in Cuba and Cubans living in the United States with an emphasis on character, social and economic class, and ethnic identity.

=== Las Balsas (The Rafts) Series (1995-1999) ===
Researching Cuban archives in a library in Key West, FL, led Rey to discover the mission of the Cuban Refugee Center on Stock Island. When Cuban immigrants would arrive to the Florida Keys on rafts, the center would provide temporary housing, medical help, food, and connected immigrants to relatives living in America. The center displayed various rafts and crafts refugees used for the 90-mile crossing. Because Rey had several relatives who traveled to America on rafts and even a grandmother who did not survive the passage, Rey created the series in hopes of drawing viewers in to explore the rafts and to ponder what the journey for Cuban refugees must have been like. The success of the persons traveling on the rafts is left ambiguous. Rey hoped for the raft imagery to metaphorically become quiet but strong reminders of human tragedies and triumphs.

=== Appropriated Memories Series (1996–1997) ===
As Jorge J.E. Gracia highlights in his essay "The Construction of Identity in Art: Alberto Rey's Journey," for the previous thirteen years, Rey's work was geared toward reclaiming his Cuban heritage. Increasingly during that period in his life, he had growing concerns about a lack of connection to his surroundings in America. In an effort to analyze what he valued, he painted beloved memories including moments with his family, cultural religions symbols, and imagery from his childhood in a small rural coal-mining town in Pennsylvania. Since then, his work has tried to mend the spirituality of his Cuban culture with seeking some sense of spirituality in his everyday life. The Appropriated Memories Series aims to capture the fulfillment of researching, finding, and painting images of what he believed were a lost time. Altogether, the images are abstracted recollections, reminiscences, and interpretations of his memory of Cuba.

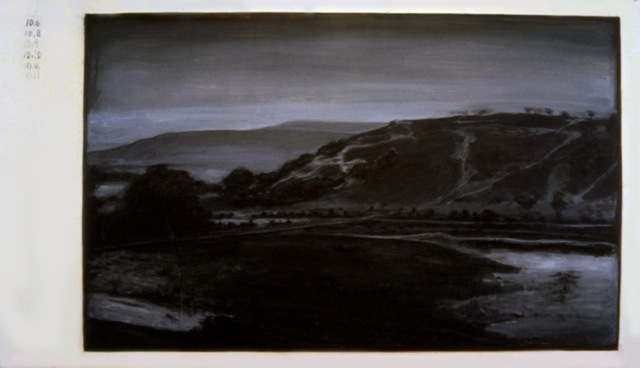
Alberto Rey, "Appropriated Memories, San Juan Hill", oils on plaster,1997. Collection of the Frost Art Museum, Florida International University, Miami, FL.

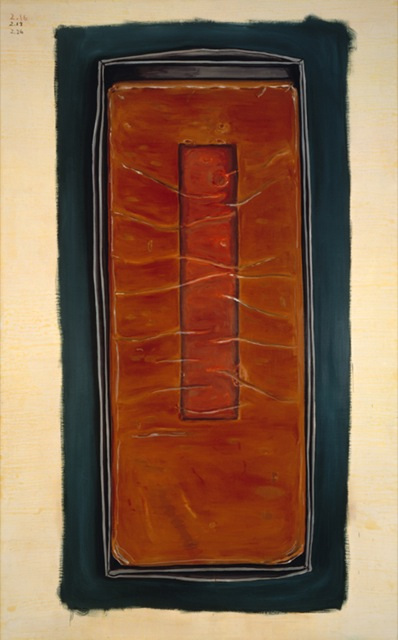
Alberto Rey, ""Ancel Guava Paste" oil on plaster, 1994. Collection of the [Museum of Art in Fort Lauderdale

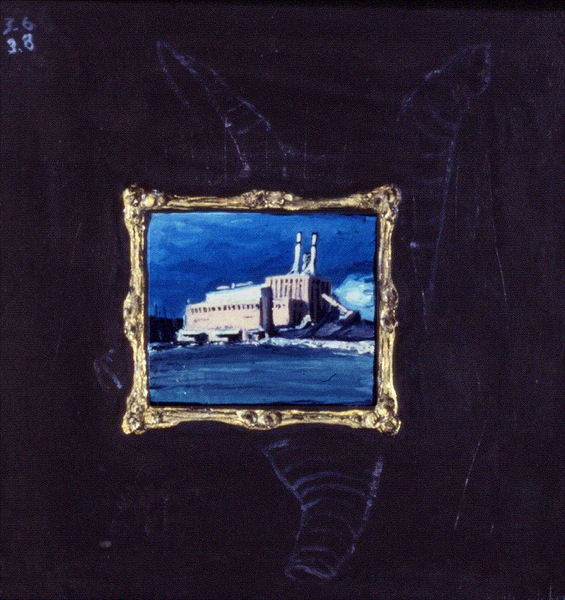
Alberto Rey, Madonnas of Western New York: Niagara Mohawk, Dunkirk, New York," oils on wood, 1991-1993

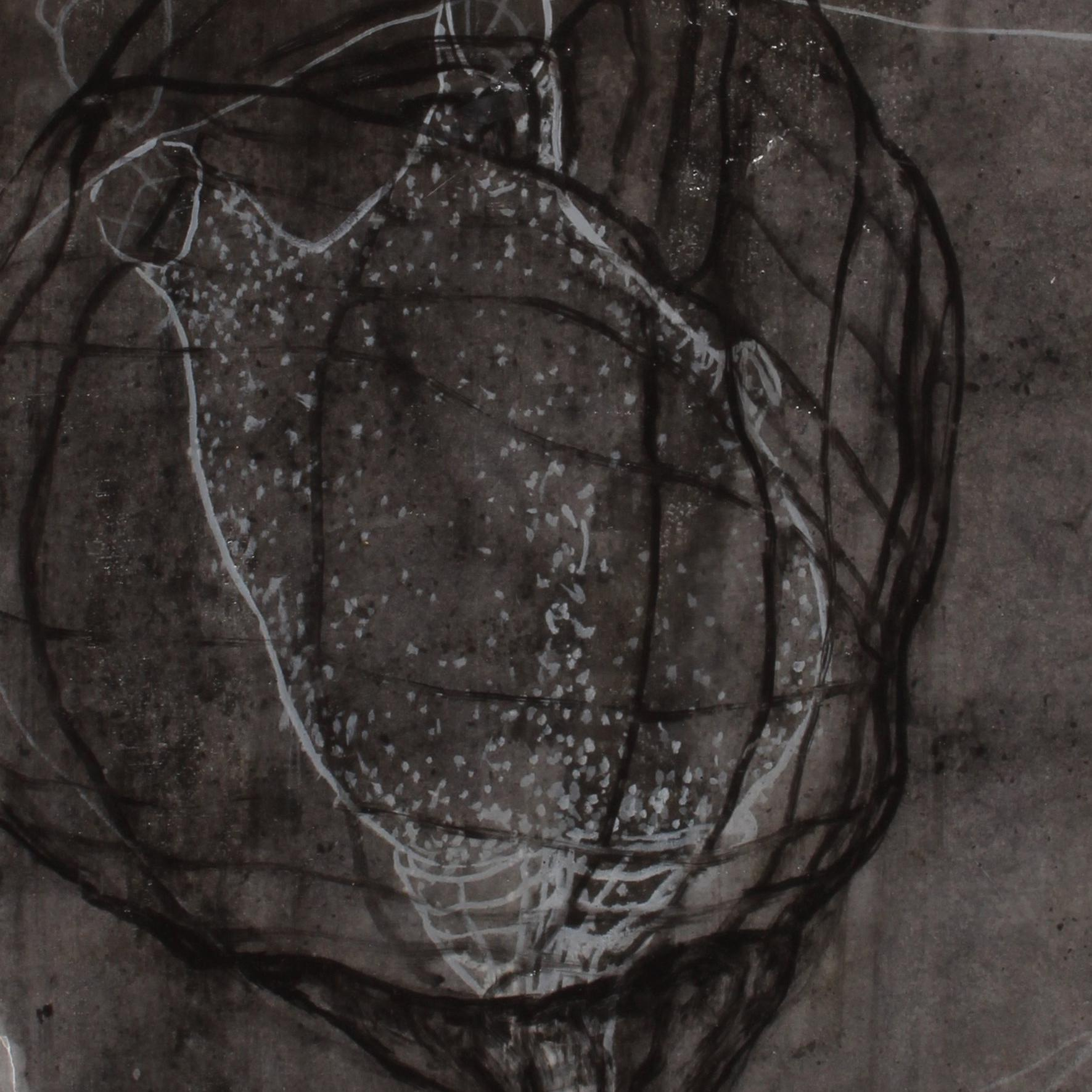
Alberto Rey, "Binary Forms: LXXIV," oil and encaustic wax on board, 1990–1992

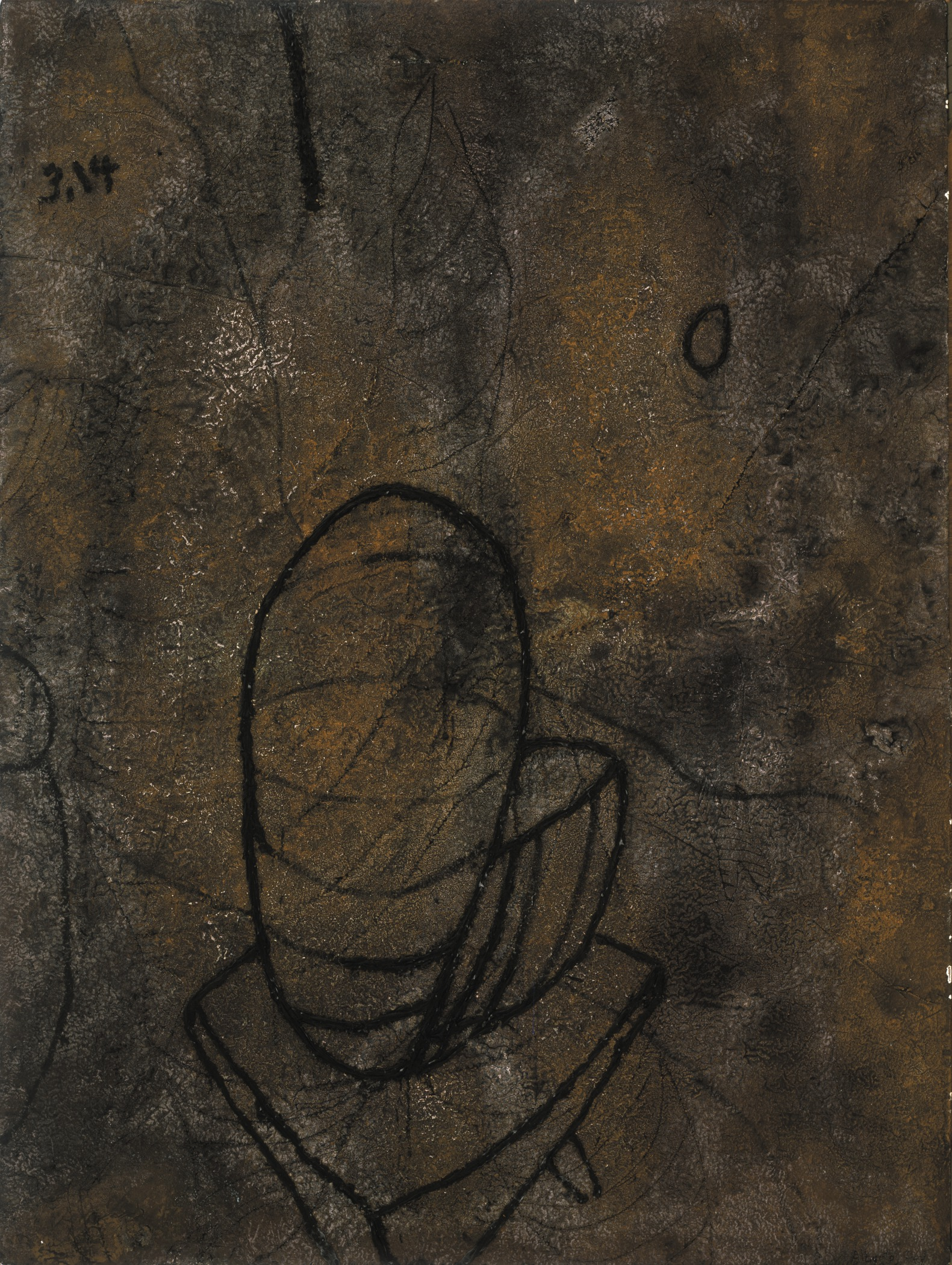
Alberto Rey, "Postnuptial Gold: Time", ink, ink wash, oils, flour compound, and rabbit skin glue on canvas, Collection Albright-Knox Art Gallery, Buffalo, New York, 1991.

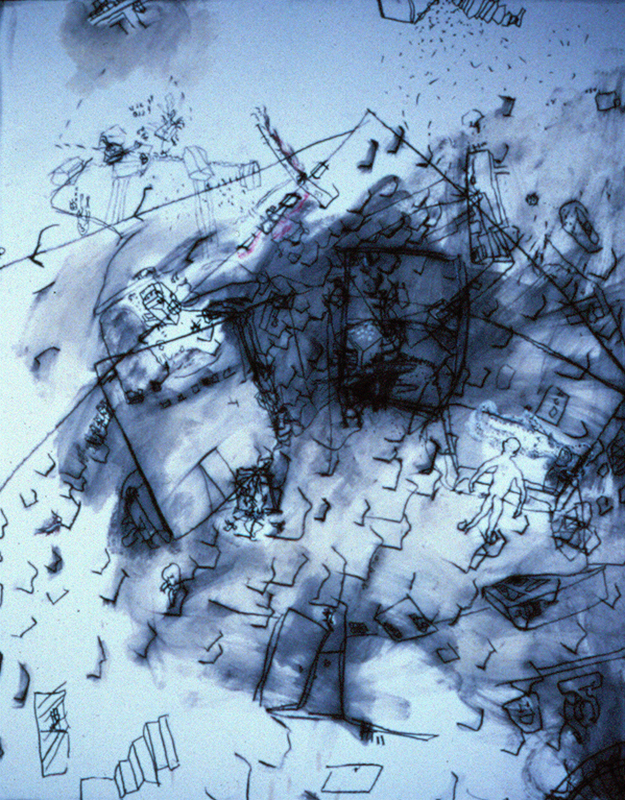
Alberto Rey, "Floating Series: Breckenridge Apartment, Buffalo, New York, Remembering: 1968-1987," ink on paper, 1985

=== Icon Series (1993–1995) ===
Lynette M.F. Bosch described how Rey's desire to reconnect to his Cuban identity as an American with no actual memories of his country shifted his work to depict objects and experiences that meant "Cuba" to him as they were described in stories told by his relatives. Rey painted Cuban food on a large scale, turning the dishes into monuments and elevating their status from everyday cuisine to iconicized cultural symbols as seen in "Ancel Guava Paste" (Completed 1994), collected into the Museum of Art in Fort Lauderdale, FL.

=== Madonnas of Western New York Series (1991–1993) ===
As Rey lived with his wife in Fredonia, NY they began exploring the cultural icons of Chautauqua County. He built small wooden boxes and painted well-known symbols of the area like the Niagara Mohawk Power Plant (Now called NRG) as seen in the work "Niagara Mohawk: Dunkirk, New York" (1992). The construction of the boxes and the transformation of ordinary sights likened to altars in religious customs, connecting Rey's new home to his Cuban heritage and traditions.

This series is described as a major change in Rey's stylistic approach from his previous abstract series. As it became necessary for the audience to be able to see and recognize these Western New York icons in order to understand their significance, Rey began painting more representationally.

=== Binary Forms Series (1998–1992) ===
His marriage in 1989, to Janeil Strong, reinvigorated his interest in depicting religion and its influence on marriage. The work uses overlapping forms to express the sometimes at-odds concepts of marriage, religion, memory, spirituality, and eroticism.

=== Black Lace Series and Nuptial Series (1987–1989) ===
Rey's Black Lace Series spurred from fascination of Catholic rituals, sainthood, and the artist's exposure to Santeria, a Cuban synthesis of Catholic and African religions. The duality of personal items such as veils worn by women for modesty in church can also be seen as seductive in other contexts. The veil, and the lace often featured on veils, became motifs in this series seen especially in the work "Fertility" (1989). In the work "Postnuptial Gold: Time" (Completed 1991, Albright-Knox Art Gallery permanent collection) the color gold symbolizes the metal's preciousness and references the Catholic Church's rites of marriage.

=== Autogeographical Series and Floating Series ( 1985-1987) ===
The Autogeographical Series drew from Rey's experiences in graduate school and often directly represented the places he lived in. An example from this body of work is "Holy Angels Church and Chair" which was collected by the Burchfield Penney Arts Center in 1987. The Floating Series took a more surreal approach to the same topic by incorporating his own dream language and depicted these land and cityscapes from a bird's-eye-view perspective. The series aims to depict the more transitory and non-permanent aspects of memory and dreaming. An example from this series is "Transitions" (completed 1988) and was collected into the Castellani Art Museum of Niagara University in Buffalo, NY.

=== Documentaries ===
"BAGMATI (Biological Regionalism: Bagmati River, Kathmandu Valley, Nepal)", Color Video, 2016–2017. This video documents the Bagmati River Art Project and includes interviews with health professionals, community members, and lawmakers. Included are traditional Nepalese folk songs and a commissioned song about the river. Screened 2017 at the Open Village Festival, Brussels, Belgium and in 2016 at the Siddhartha Gallery, in Kathmandu, Nepal.

"Biological Regionalism: Atlantic Cod" (2007), black and white video, was created for a residency at the Peabody Essex Museum in Salem, MA. The artist explores a brief history of the Atlantic cod and its influence on the economy of New England. It screened in 2007 at the Peabody Essex Museum in Salem, MA.

Primal Connections" (2006) investigates how people in the modern age make meaningful connections to nature. This video was screened and acquired into the permanent collection of the MEIAC in Spain in 2013. It screened in 2013 at the Extremeño e Iberoamericano de Arte Contemporáneo (Extremaduran and Latin American Museum of Contemporary Art), in 2008 at Washington and Lee University, and in 2006 at the Rochester Contemporary Gallery.

"An Unkept Promise" (2005) details the emotional journey of Rey taking his first return trip to his home country of Cuba 36 years after emigrating with his family as a child. This video was screened at many different venues and was acquired into the permanent collection of the MEIAC in Spain in 2013.

"Waters off of Caribarien, Cuba" (2004) depicts the waters surrounding a small island where many Cubans traveled by raft through the Gulf Stream to Florida; it was inducted into the permanent collection of the Burchfield Penney Art Center and later in 2013, it was both screened and acquired by the MEIAC. It screened in 2017, 2013, and 2005 at the Burchfield Penney Art Center and the Lucille Ball Desi Arnaz Museum, in 2015 at Canisius College, in 2013 at Extremeño e Iberoamericano de Arte Contemporáneo, in 2013 at the Masur Museum, in 2010 at the Memorial Art Gallery, in 2010 at University of Buffalo, in 2008 at Mary Baldwin College, Staunton, VA, in 2008 at Washington and Lee University, in 2007 at Cleveland Institute of Art, in 2007 at the Chautauqua Institution, and in 2005 at the DeadCenter Film Festival, Oklahoma City, OK.

"Seeing the Dark" (2001), a black-and-white 16mm film, encapsulates Rey's first return trip to Cuba since his childhood emigration, and signaled a change in viewpoint to cease depicting his home country in nostalgic methods.

== Published writings ==
- Rey, Alberto (2014). Bosch, Lynette M. F.; Denaci, Mark (eds.). Life streams: Alberto Rey's Cuban and American art. Albany, New York: SUNY Press. ISBN 9781438450582. OCLC 877868136.
- 2014 - Life Streams – Alberto Rey's Cuban and American Art, SUNY Press, Albany, NY for the Burchfield Penney Art Center, Buffalo
- 2016 - Complexities of Water: Biological Regionalism: Bagmati River, Kathmandu Valley, Nepal, Canadaway Press, Fredonia, NY for the Kathmandu Contemporary Arts Center and Siddhartha Art Gallery, about the holiest and most polluted river Bagmati River in Kathmandu, Nepal.
- 2018 - Extinct Birds Project, Canadaway Press, Fredonia, NY for the Roger Tory Peterson Institute, Jamestown, NY.
- 2021 - Lost Beauty: Icebergs, Canadaway Press, Fredonia, NY
- 2021 - Lost Beauty II – The Art of Museum Stories, Canadaway Press, Fredonia, NY for the Buffalo Museum of Science, Buffalo, NY
- 2021 - Canadaway Creek – Western New York, Canadaway Press, Fredonia, NY
- 2022 - Biological Regionalism: Oswego River and Lake Ontario, Central New York, USA, Canadaway Press, Fredonia, NY for the Tyler Art Gallery, SUNY Oswego, NY.
- 2025 - Atlas: Historical Works and Recent Journeys of Alberto Rey, for the Marion Art Gallery, SUNY Fredonia.

== Awards and honors ==
Rey has received the following honors and awards:

- Finalist Orvis Guide Freshwater Guide of the Year, Sunderland, Vermont (2020)
- Visiting Artist at the Masur Museum, Monroe, LA (2012)
- Living Legacy Artist by the Burchfield Penney Arts Center (2012).
- Distinguished Alumni Award at the Indiana University of Pennsylvania, Indiana, PA (2008)
- Visiting Artist Residency at Peabody Essex Museum, Salem, MA (2008)
- State University of New York Distinguished Professor for Research and Creativity, Albany, NY (2007)
- State University of New York Chancellor's Research Recognition Award, Albany, NY (2005)
- State University of New York Chancellor's Award for Excellence in Scholarship and Creative Activity, Albany, NY (2003)
- Kasling Lecturer Award for distinguished scholarly and creative activity as senior faculty member, State University of New York at Fredonia, NY (2001)
- William T. and Charlotte N. Hagan Young Scholar/Artist Award. This award recognizes an individual who has made out- standing recent achievements in research or creativity State University of New York at Fredonia, Fredonia, NY (1994)
- Minority Visiting Scholars Award, Central Missouri State University, Warrensburg, MO (1994)
