= Alexander Drysdale =

Alexander Drysdale may refer to:

- Mahé Drysdale (Alexander Mahé Owens Drysdale, born 1978), New Zealand rower
- Alexander John Drysdale (1870–1934), artist
