= Masur Museum of Art =

Historic house in Louisiana, United States

- Masur House
- U.S. National Register of Historic Places
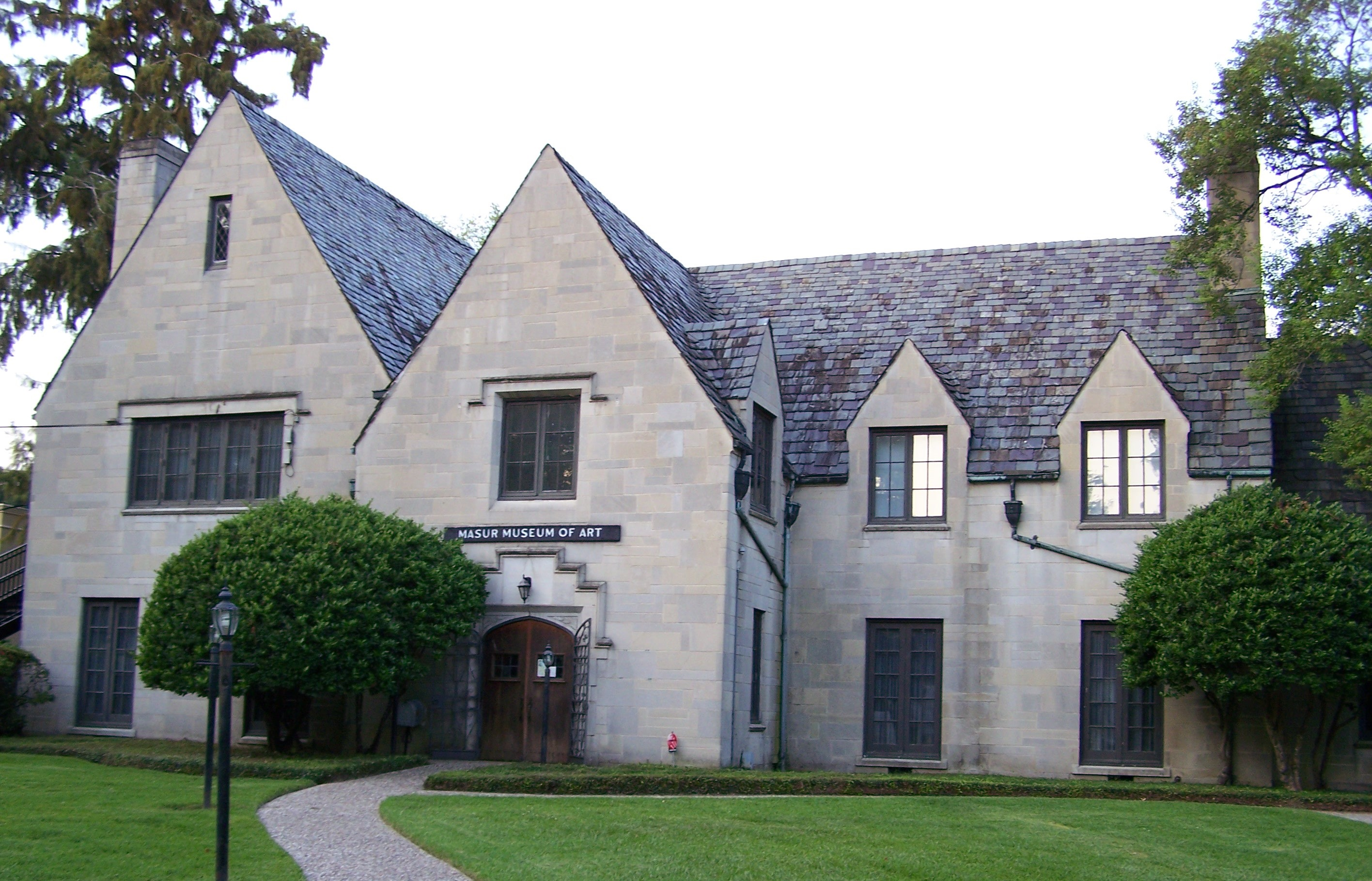

- Location within Louisiana Location within the United States
- Location: 1400 South Grand St. Monroe, Louisiana
- Coordinates: 32.510278°N 92.095°W
- Area: 0.2 acres (0.081 ha)
- Built: 1914
- Architect: Clarence Edward Slagle
- Architectural style: Modified Tudor
- Website: www.masurmuseum.org
- NRHP reference No.: 94001590
- Added to NRHP: July 22, 1982

The Masur Museum of Art in Monroe, Louisiana in the United States, is the largest visual arts museum in northeast Louisiana. It is in the former home of the Masur family, the Masur House, also known as the Slagle-Masur House, which is listed on the National Register of Historic Places. The building, constructed in modified Tudor style in 1929, was listed on the National Register in 1982 for its architecture. In 1963 it was given to the city of Monroe by the Masur family.

The mission of the museum is to support and foster visual arts in the community through exhibitions, both temporary and from the museum's permanent collection, as well as providing educational programs for both children and adults. Lectures, films, and artist talks are presented in the Lower River Gallery. The Carriage House is used for art classes, summer art camps, workshops, and demonstrations. Admission to the museum is free. The permanent collection includes works by Thomas Hart Benton, Mary Cassatt, Philip Guston, Joan Miró, Robert Motherwell, Pablo Picasso, Auguste Rodin. Salvador Dalí, Alex Katz, Fairfield Porter, and Georges Rouault. The collection also features the work of distinguished artists with ties to Louisiana, namely Lynda Benglis, Clyde Connell, Alexander John Drysdale, John Geldersma, Ida Kohlmeyer, Eugene J. Martin, and George Rodrigue, among others. Also included in the collection are several long-term loans that are on view on a rotating basis. These include works by Marc Chagall, Joan Miró, Pablo Picasso, and Pierre-Auguste Renoir.

== History ==
The Masur Museum of Art was built as a private residence in 1929. A lumberman by the name of Clarence Edward Slagle had the modified Tudor estate built for his wife Mabel. The Indiana limestone and Pennsylvania blue slate used to build the home were transported on various waterways to the scenic Ouachita River, which runs behind the estate. The home was given the name Grey Gables by the Slagles. Originally the grounds included an English style rose garden and a lawn extending down to the river. When the Army Corps of Engineers built the levee system in the 1930s, the home's carriage house was moved behind the new levee, but only had to be moved twenty feet.

In 1934 Clarence Slagle passed away and his widow soon after sold the home to the Masur family. Sigmund and Beatrice Masur and their children Sylvian, Jack, and Bertha Marie, lived in the home until the 1960s. The Masur children donated the home to the City of Monroe in 1963 to be converted into a fine art museum. Initially the museum began to present exhibitions and art education through the hard work of docents and volunteers. In 1974, the Twin City Art Foundation was formed to provide additional support for the museum, providing funding for exhibitions, educational programs, and the permanent collection. To this day the Masur operates as a partnership between the City of Monroe and the Twin City Art Foundation. The Masur Museum of Art is a division of the Department of Community Affairs within the City of Monroe.
