= David Butler (sculptor) =

American sculptor (1898–1997)

- David Butler with his bike in Patterson, Louisiana, 1982
- Born: 1898; Good Hope, Louisiana
- Died: 1997 (aged 98–99); Patterson, Louisiana
- Known for: Sculpture
- Movement: Modern Art

David Butler (1898–1997) was an African American sculptor and painter from Good Hope, Louisiana. His style is epitomized by kinetic sculptures made from recycled tin or wood, which he embellished with saturated colors and geometric patterns. His work is now in the permanent collections of the Smithsonian American Art Museum, the American Folk Art Museum, and the Philadelphia Museum of Art.

== Early life ==
Butler was the eldest of eight children. His father was a carpenter and his mother was a Baptist Missionary. Born and raised in Good Hope, Louisiana, Butler began sculpting and woodworking under the tutelage of his father. He dropped out of school at an early age to take care of his younger siblings while his parents worked. His time spent entertaining and caring for his younger siblings, which fed the creativity and whimsy that later fueled his art work.

Butler held various jobs typical of the residents of the Atchafalaya Basin, such as cutting grass and sugarcane, laboring in saw mills and pulp factories, and just before his retirement, working as a box factory laborer.

The 1960s brought both social and personal turmoil to Butler's life. Desegregation and the civil rights movement made life in southern Louisiana increasingly difficult for African American communities. In 1962, Butler was forced into retirement on disability due to a head injury that he sustained at the box factory. In 1968 his wife Elnora died. Coupled with his retirement, this left him feeling "chronically nervous." After his retirement, Butler began to adorn his home and yard by turning used tin into flowers for his garden, window coverings (which he called "spirit shields"), and "whirligigs" that moved according to the winds. He was famous for riding, as his only transportation, a bicycle meticulously decorated with found and created objects that spun and moved as the wheels turned. Butler saw his daily five-mile ride as one that enabled him to share his work with others.

Butler's work garnered the attention of art collectors and curators quickly, and by the 1980s, his yard and home were often vandalized by collectors or community members. These disruptions caused him to move in with his niece. Eventually, he entered a nursing home in Morgan City, Louisiana, where he died in 1997.

== Career ==
David Butler was affectionately called "The Tin Man" by local children. He began creating art in his 60s. He primarily worked with recycled tin and other found, malleable metals to create sculptures and 2-dimensional silhouettes, which decorated his home and its surroundings. Butler's use of recycled material was intentional and in accordance with his belief that "used materials have life." Even the paints that he used to adorn the metals were donated to him by other people after serving a utilitarian purpose.

Butler used simple tools such as tin snips, an old meat cleaver, hammers, and nails, to cut, bend, and sculpt used roofing tin. He bent flat sheets of metal into 3-dimensional shapes that he would combine to make free-standing, mobile whirligigs. He painted these sculptures in geometric patterns and vibrant colors. He cut narrative silhouettes of humans, animals, and plants out of roofing tin, which he then affixed to the windows of his home. This allowed for light to pass through the windows and cast fanciful shadows into the interior. He told his friend and fellow sculptor, John Geldersma, that these window coverings were "spirit shields," which protected him from the negativity that plagued him after the death of his wife.

Many scholars make connections between the symbolism in Butler's art and West African and Afro-Caribbean traditions such as Kongolese Cosmograms and grave embellishments, Haitian popular art, and Vodun. Although Butler never gave credence to these claims, he was adamant that his work was inspired by and carried out for God. He claimed to receive "dreams from God" that inspired him. His faith was learned from his mother, a Baptist missionary, leaving Butler ambivalent about selling his work. In a statement for the Artist's Alliance in 1983, he said " I can make things because God gave me a gift. God don't want no one selling what's a gift. If you have a gift, then you shouldn't be taking no money." Throughout his life, he refuted claims that he was an artist and never attended exhibition openings or made gallery visits.

As Butler's work gained attention from museums and collectors, people began to exploit Butler's gifts and environment. Notably, collectors would enter his property unannounced, typically when Butler was not home, take work from his collection, and leave whatever payment they saw fit without consulting or gaining permission from Butler. His family took pieces as well, and sold them to art dealers without permission. Even after Butler's relocation from his ransacked home to an assisted living facility, his children continued to replicate his work and sell it to potential buyers.

=== Exhibitions and Permanent Collections ===
Butler's work has been documented in the following exhibitions:

- Shared Visions, Separate Realities. 22 Mar.- 2 May. 1985, East Campus Gallery- Valencia Community College, Valencia, LA.
- Baking in the Sun: Visionary Images from the South. 1987, University of Southwestern Louisiana Art Museum, Lafayette, LA.
- Black Folk Art in America: 1930–1980.14 Feb.- 28 Mar. 1989, Corcoran Gallery of Art, Washington D.C.
- It'll Come True: Eleven Artists First and Last. 11 Apr.-16 May 1992, Artists' Alliance, Lafayette, LA.
- Sublime Spaces and Visionary Worlds: built environments of vernacular artists. 2007, John Michael Kohler Arts Center, Sheboygan, WI.
- Outside Art of David Butler. 15 Jun. 2011- Mar. 2012, Louisiana State Museum, New Orleans.
- Shelter: David Butler-- Road Less Traveled Exhibition Series. 17 May- 10 Sep. 2017, John Michael Kohler Arts Center, Sheboygan, WI.
- Outliers and Vanguard Artists. 28 Jan.- 13 May. 2018, National Gallery of Art, Washington D.C.
- Vernacular Voices: Self-Taught, Outsider, and Visionary Art from the Permanent Collection. 8 Mar.- 14 Jul 2019, Ogden Museum of Southern Art, New Orleans.

Butler's work is held in the following museums' permanent collections:

- The Newark Museum of Art
- African American Museum of Dallas' Billy R. Allen Folk Art Collection
- Philadelphia Museum of Art.
- High Museum's T. Marshall Hahn Collection.
- Ogden Museum of Southern Art.
- New Orleans Museum of Art
- American Folk Art Museum
- Akron Art Museum
- Museum of International Folk Art
- Smithsonian American Art Museum
