= Good Hope, Louisiana =

- Unincorporated community
- Location within Louisiana Location within the United States
- Coordinates: 29°59′29″N 90°24′02″W
- Country: United States
- State: Louisiana
- Parish: St. Charles
- Elevation: 10 ft (3.0 m)

Population (2020)
  - Total: 0
- Time zone: UTC-6 (Central (CST))
  - Summer (DST): UTC-5 (CDT)
- Area code: 504
- GNIS feature ID: 560845

Good Hope (also known as Goodhope or Norco-goodhope) was a census-designated place (CDP) in St. Charles Parish, Louisiana, United States, located on the east bank of the Mississippi River.

It was located between the towns of New Sarpy and Norco before being annexed by Norco on September 5, 2000. The town has a total population of zero.

== History ==
The annexation by Norco was the eventual result of a 1983 buyout of all residential and commercial property by the Good Hope Refinery.

== Notable people ==
- David Butler, sculptor and artist

== See also ==
- List of ghost towns in Louisiana
