= Hermenegildo Bustos =

Mexican painter

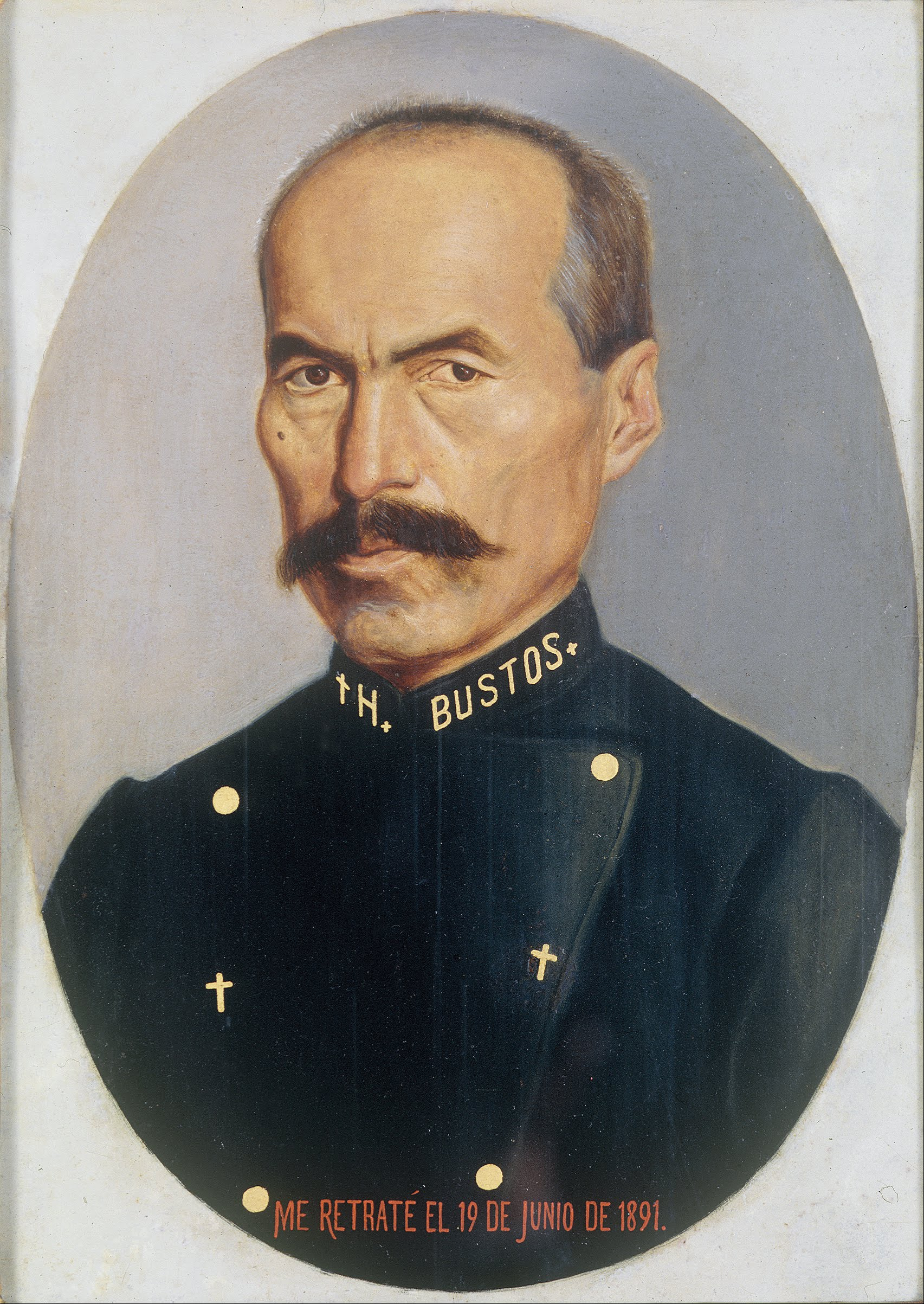
Self-portrait (1901)

José Hermenegildo de la Luz Bustos Hernández (13 April 1832, Purísima del Rincón – 28 June 1907, Purísima del Rincón) was a Mexican painter; known mostly for portraits, although he also created religious paintings and still-lifes.

== Biography ==
He was born to a fervent Catholic family, descended from Indians who had been attached to the mission. Despite growing up in a small village, his youth was subject to the turmoils of the time, including a cholera epidemic, "La Desamortización" and the establishment of the Mexican nation.

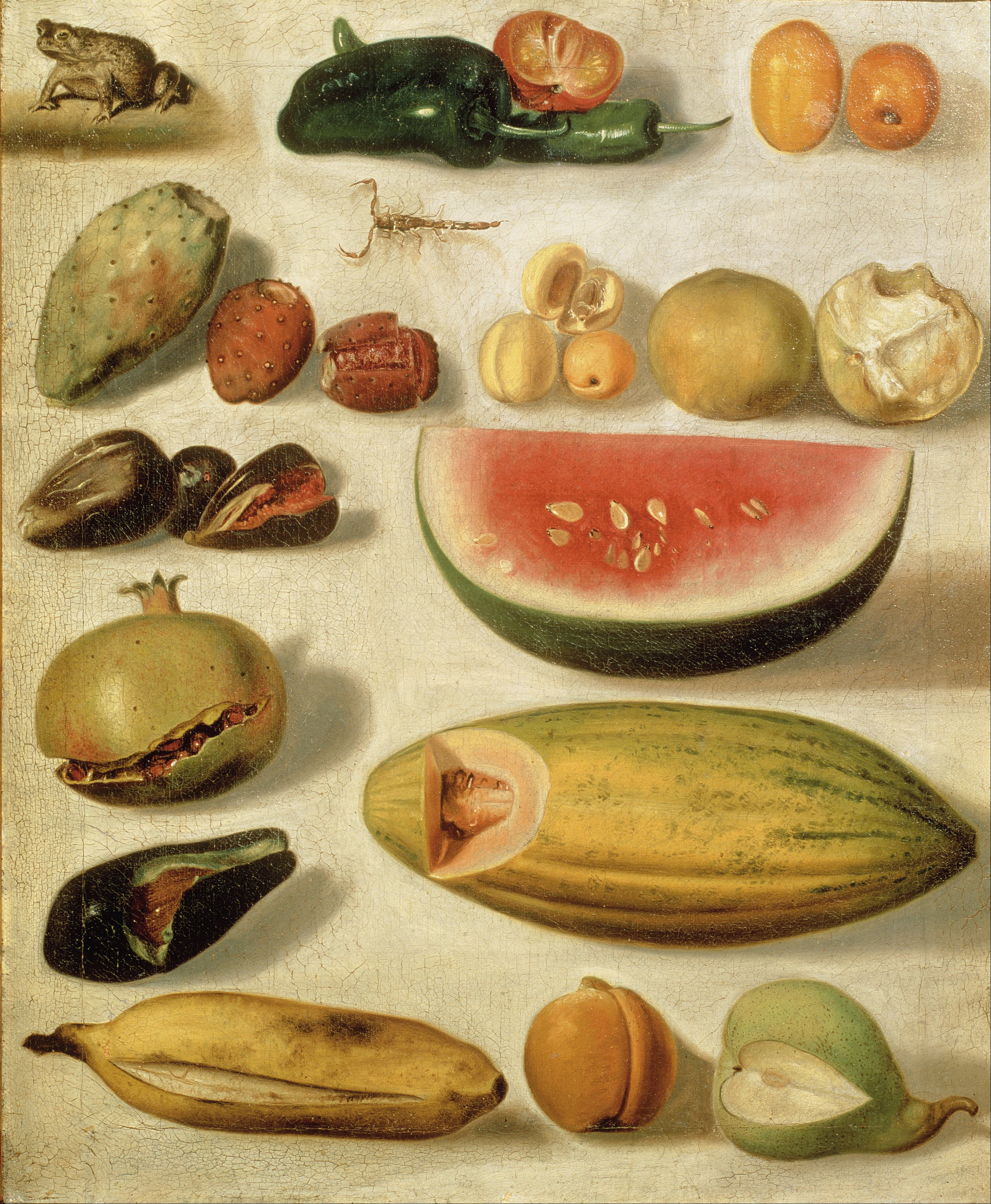
Still-life with Fruit, Scorpion and Frog (1874)

Following in his father's footsteps, he served as a sort of registrar for the village; recording names, dates and events. At various times, he worked as a tinsmith, tailor, carpenter, musician and mason; also displaying an affinity for history and astronomy. He also maintained an orchard for most of his life.

His only formal artistic studies were six months spent with Juan Nepomuceno Herrera (1818–1878), a portrait painter from nearby León, who apparently taught him little and treated him like a servant. His first known painting dates from 1850, when he was eighteen; a portrait of Vicente Arriaga, a local priest. In 1852, he painted a posthumous portrait of his father, who had died the year before.

Over the next few years, he created complete sets of portraits of all the notable families in the area. He was married in 1854. For two weeks in 1858, Purísima played host to President-elect Benito Juárez, who decided to establish an office there, and Bustos was chosen to paint his portrait (now lost).

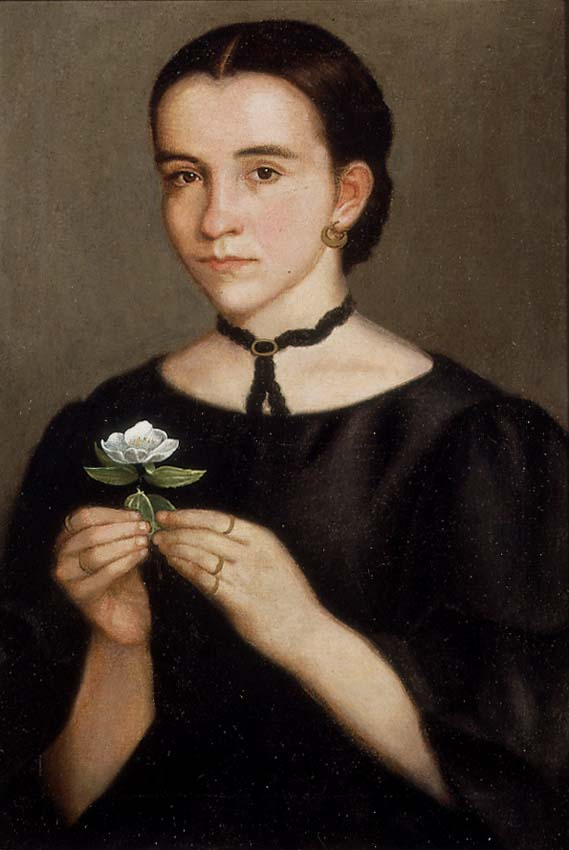
Portrait of Dolores Hollos (1864)

His own self-portrait was not painted until 1901. He designed and made his own coat for the occasion, which displays the words, Hermenegildo Bustos, indio de este pueblo de Purísima del Rincón, nací el 13 de abril de 1832. His paintings were often inscribed on the reverse with Hermenegildo Bustos de aficionado pintó (amateur painter). Some sculptures in the village are attributed to him; including an Ecce Homo and a Virgen de los Dolores.

Following the Mexican Revolution, the nation's cultural heritage was reassessed and Bustos' work gained more notice, eventually receiving significant attention in the book Pintura Mexicana by Roberto Montenegro. In 1940, he was profiled in the catalog for the exhibition "Twenty Centuries of Mexican Art" at the Museum of Modern Art. His work has also appeared at exhibitions in Paris (1952), London (1953) and Tokyo (1955). In 1956, a portion of the municipality was renamed "Purísima de Bustos", in his honor. The famous Mexican writer Octavio Paz wrote about Hermenegildo Bustos in 1985.

== Art ==
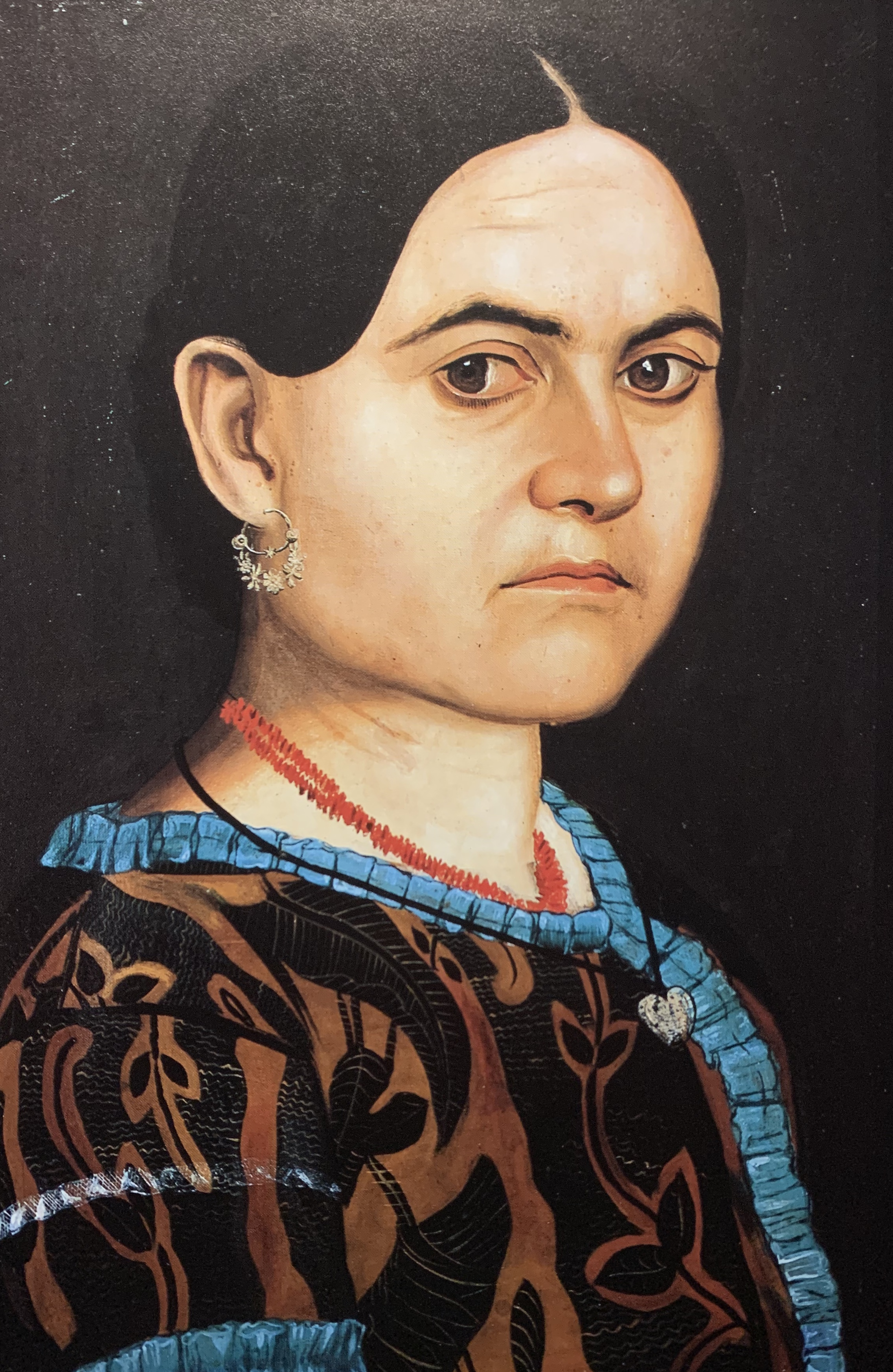
Joaquina Rios de Bustos by Hermenegildo Bustos

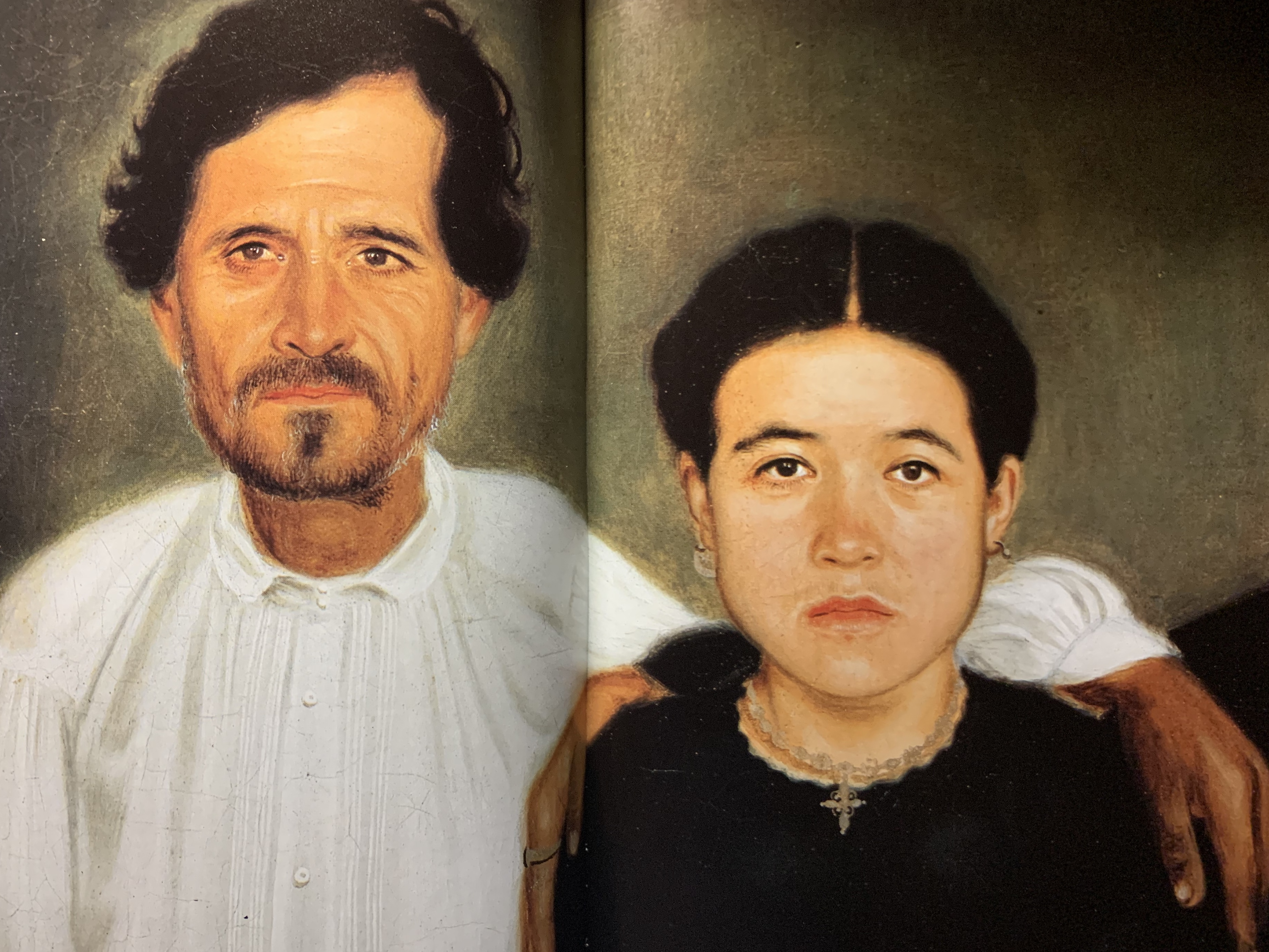
Family Portrait by Hermenegildo Bustos

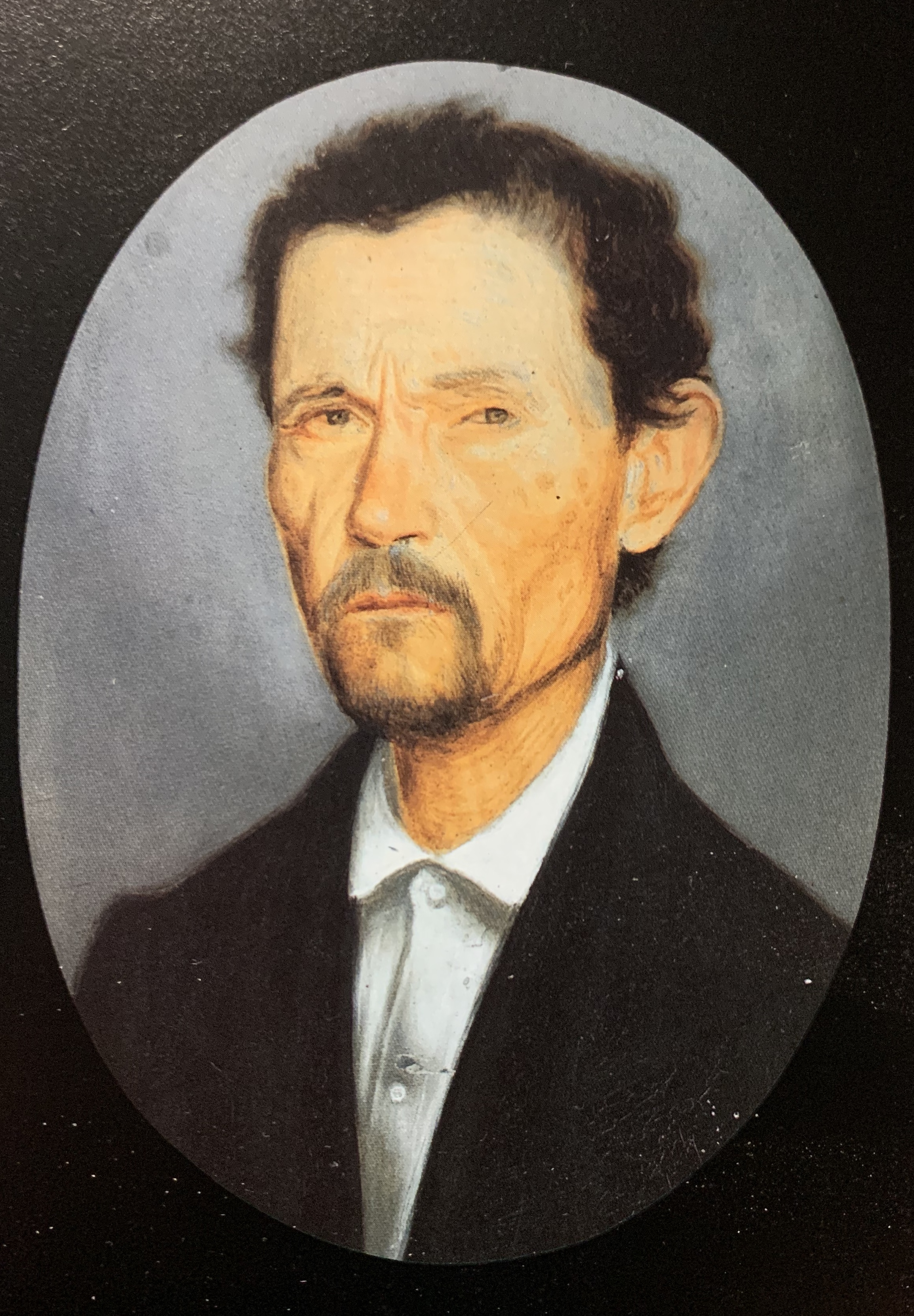
1887, Felipe Lopez by Hermenegildo Bustos

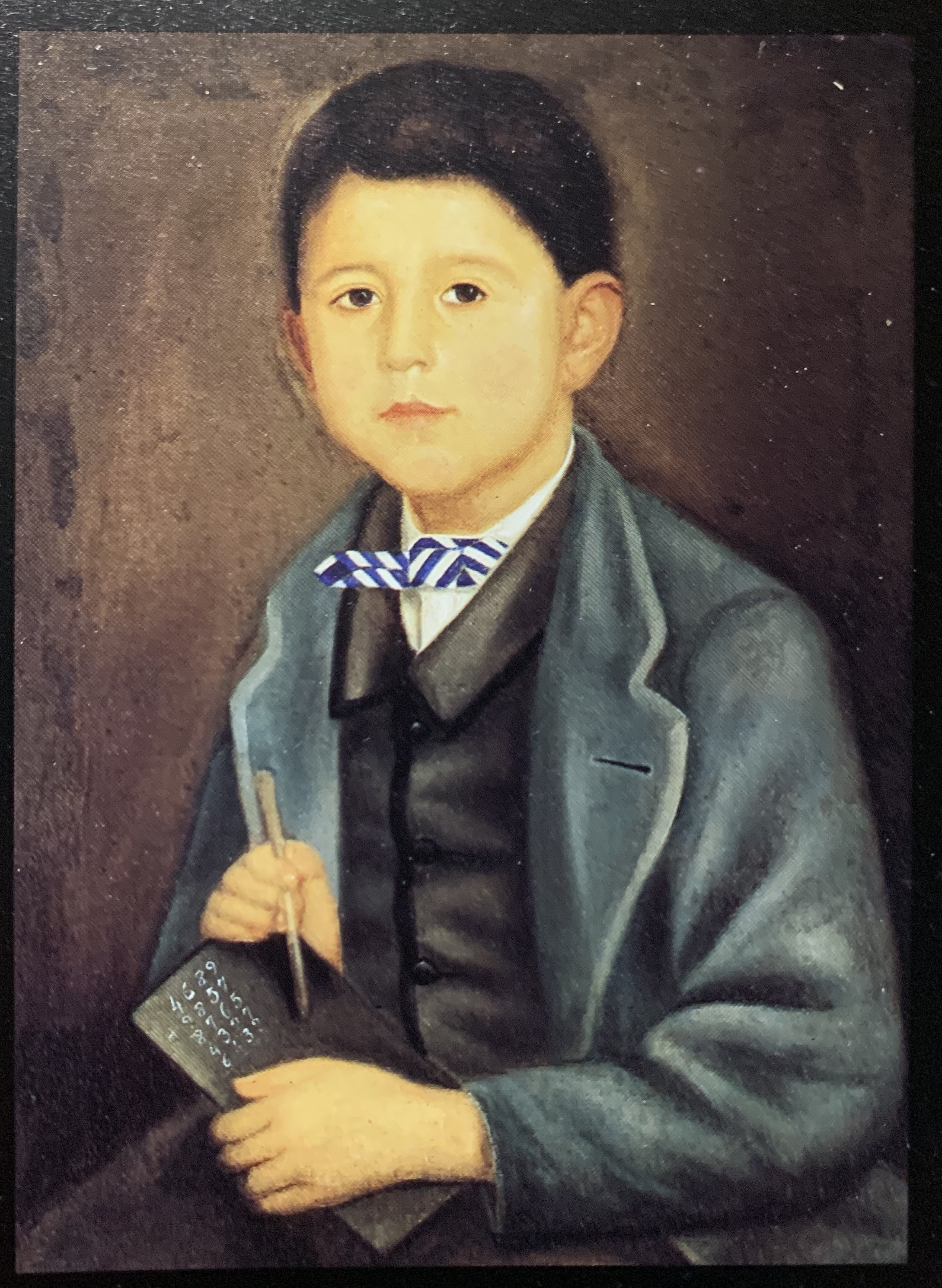
1867, Jesus Munoz by Hermenegildo Bustos

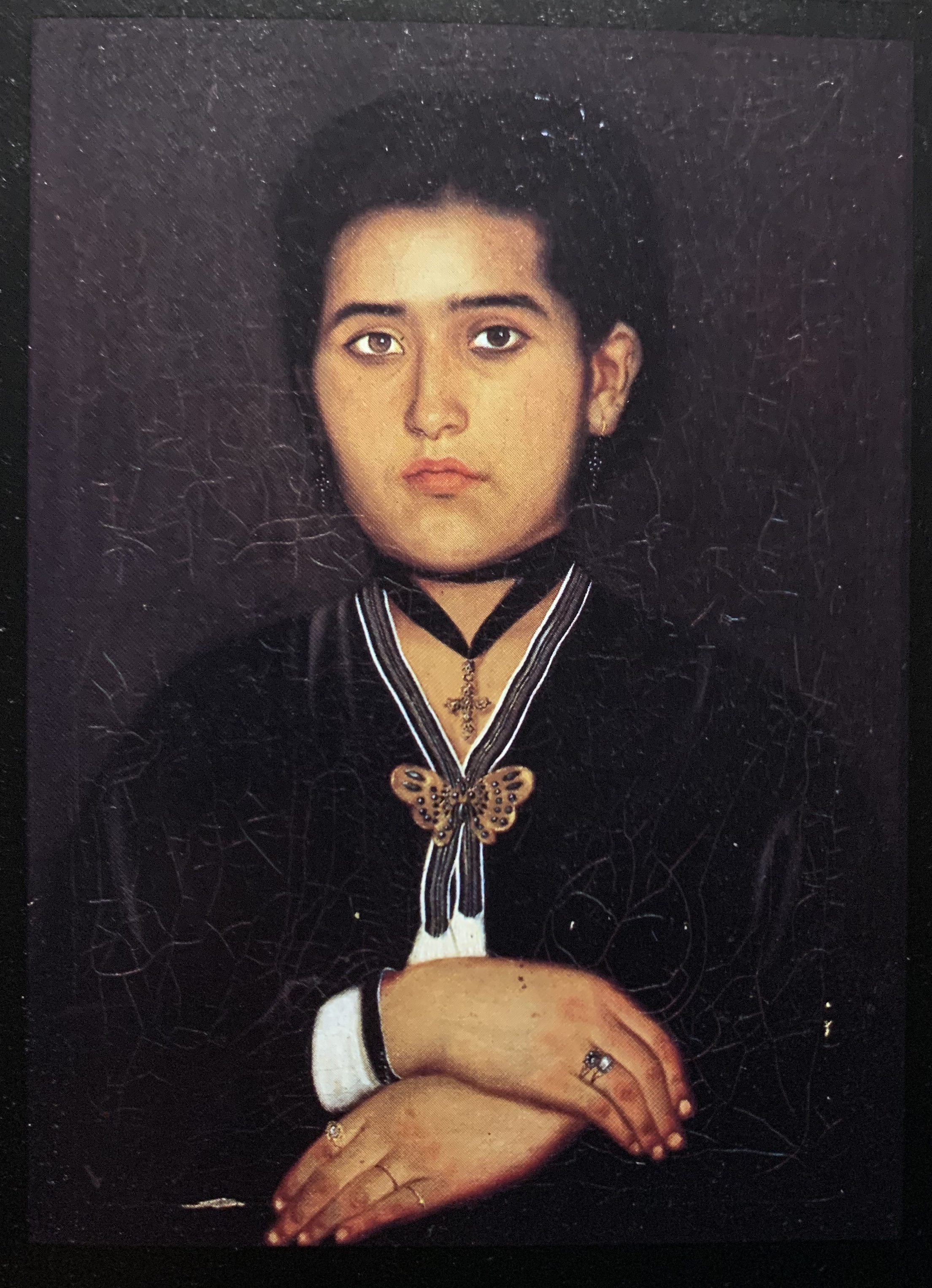
1871, Alejandra Aranda by Hermenegildo Bustos

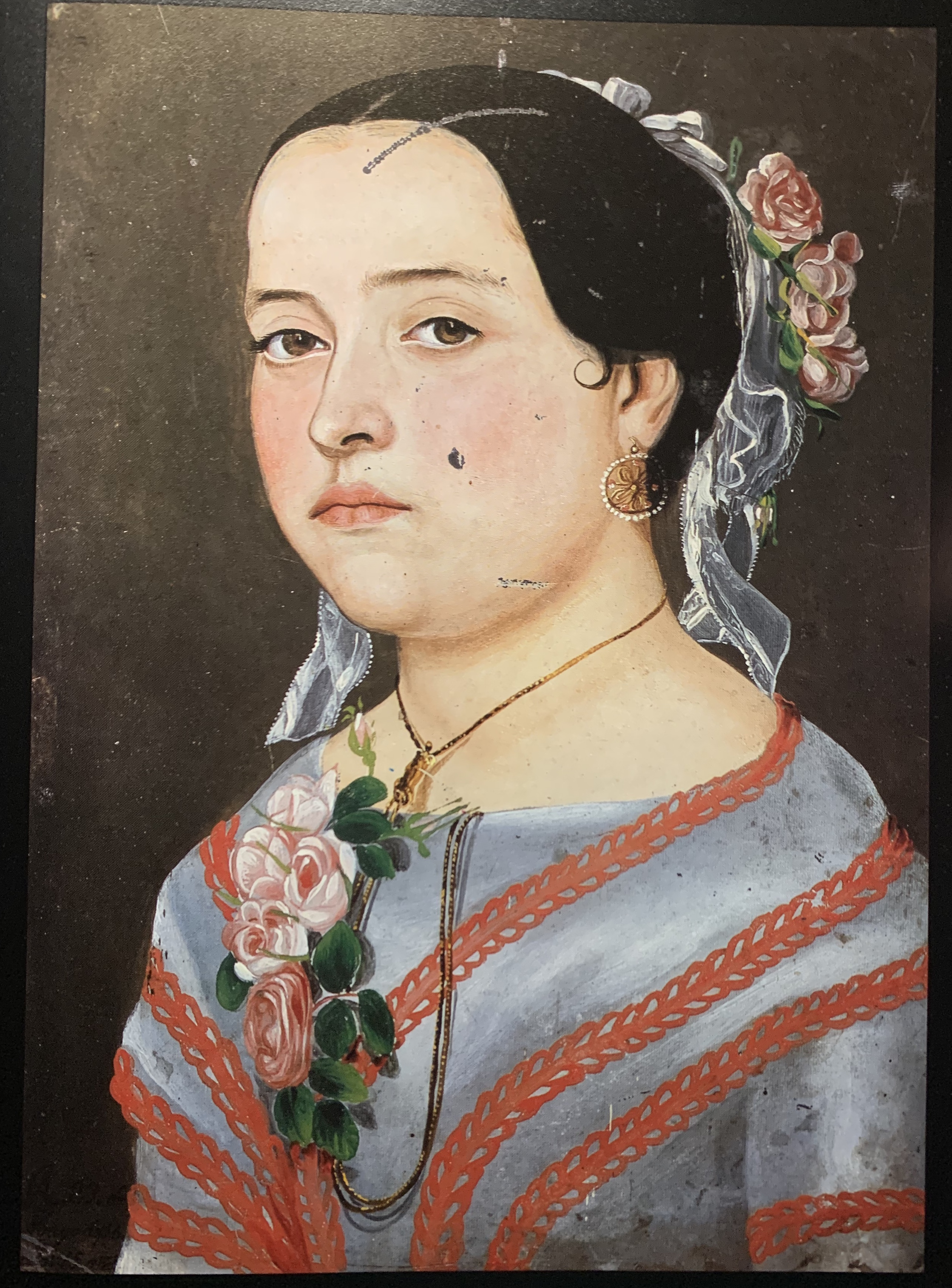
1856, Francisca Valdivia by Hermenegildo Bustos

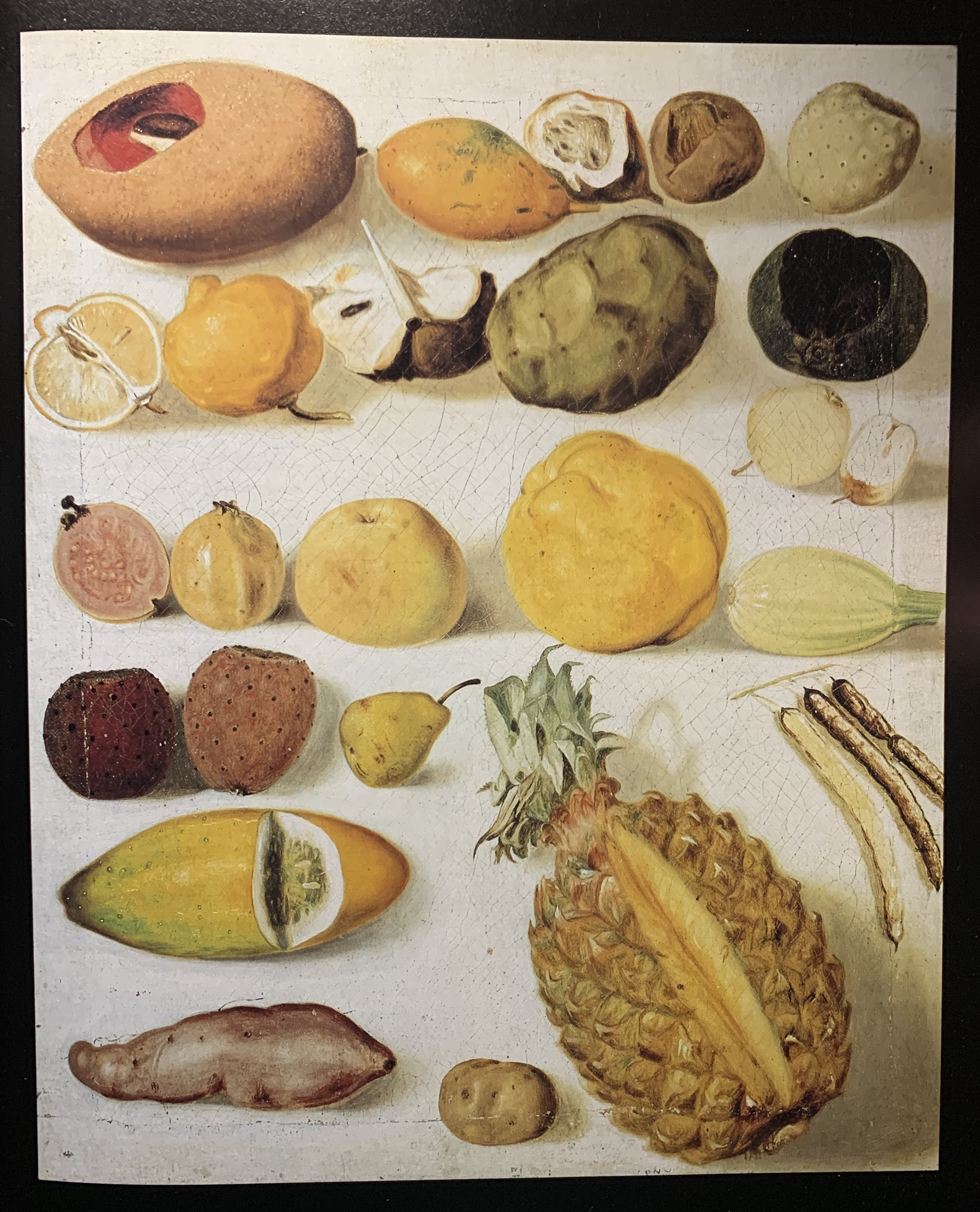
1877, Still Life with Fruit by Hermenegildo Bustos

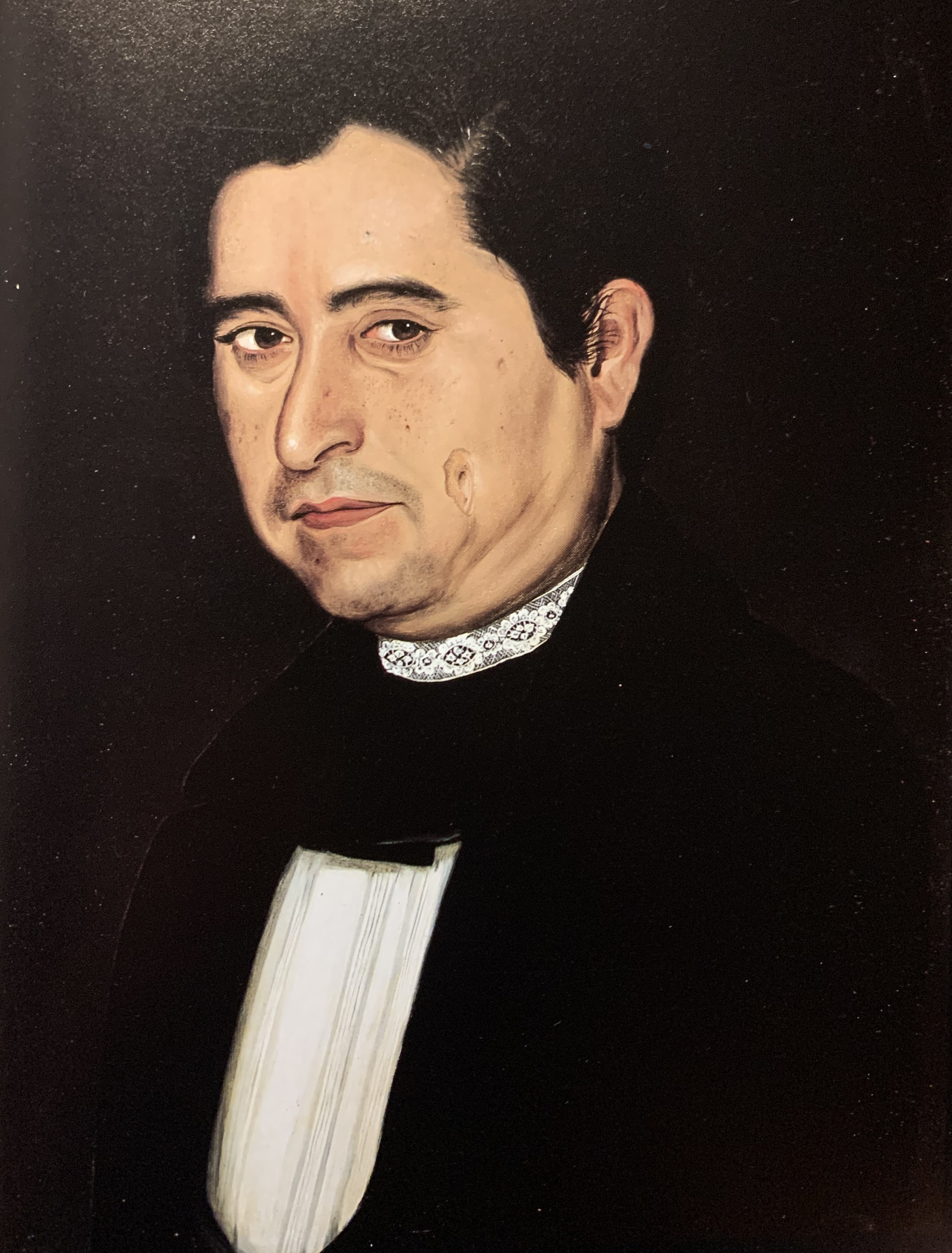
1854, Portrait of a Priest by Hermenegildo Bustos

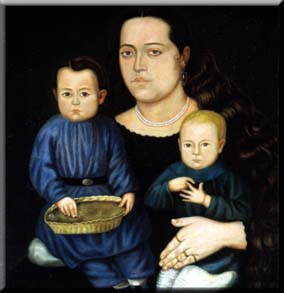
Da. Francisca Valdivia de Chávez and sons. (1862)
