= Museo Extremeño e Iberoamericano de Arte Contemporáneo =

Coordinates: 38.8717°N 6.9711°W

Ibero-American Museum of Contemporary Art
- Museo Extremeño e Iberoamericano de Arte Contemporáneo
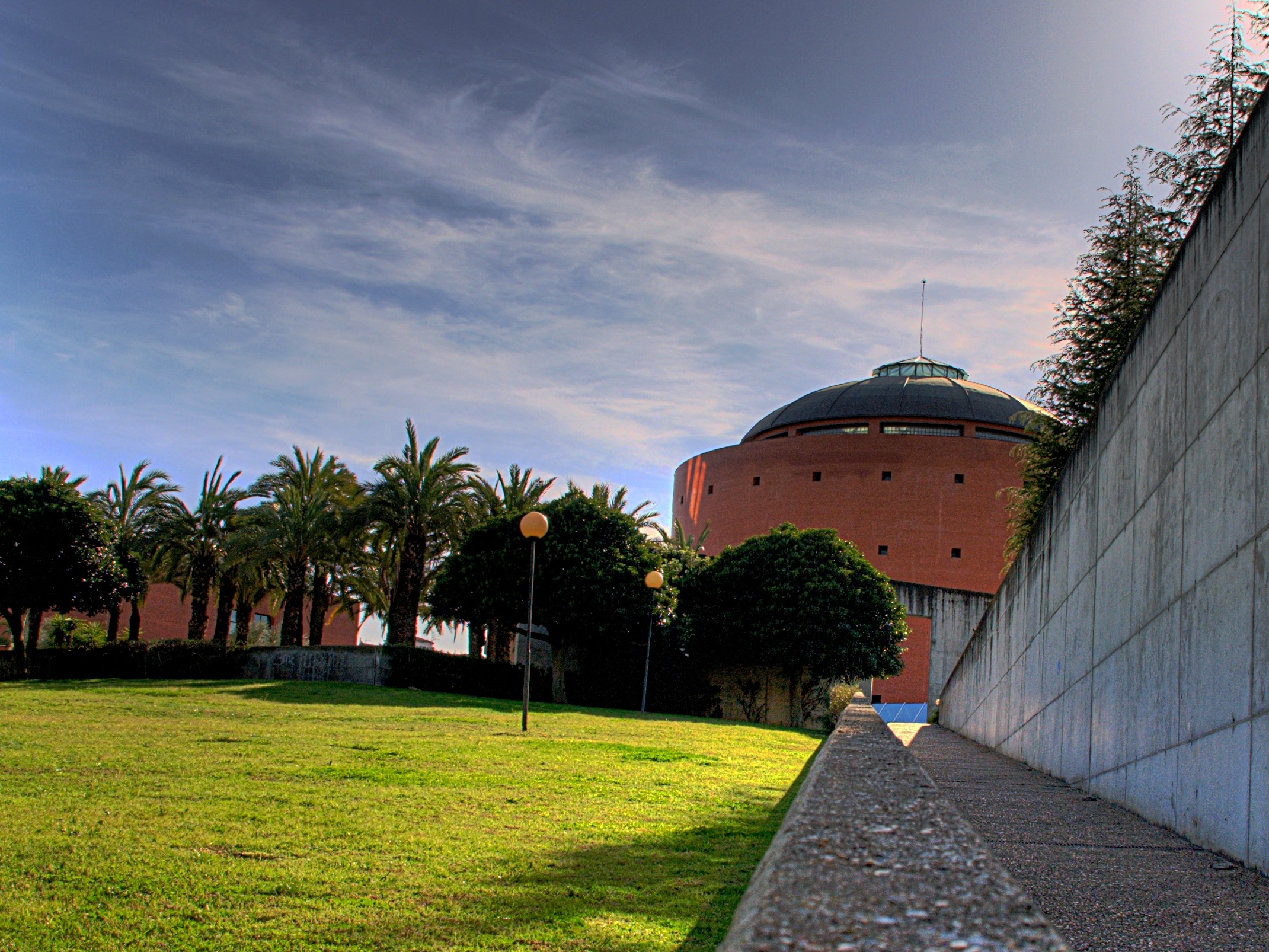
- Established: May 1995
- Location: Badajoz, Spain
- Type: Contemporary art museum

The Museo Extremeño e Iberoamericano de Arte Contemporáneo (MEIAC) or Ibero-American Museum of Contemporary Art is a contemporary art museum located in the city of Badajoz, Extremadura, Spain.

Created in May 1995, it is housed in a building designed by the architect José Antonio Galea. It is on the site of the former Pretrial Detention and Correctional Center, which was built in the mid-1950s on the grounds of the former 17th-century Fort of Pardaleras.

The museum has a collection of art works of Spanish, Portuguese, and Latin American artists.
