= Alexander John Drysdale =

American painter

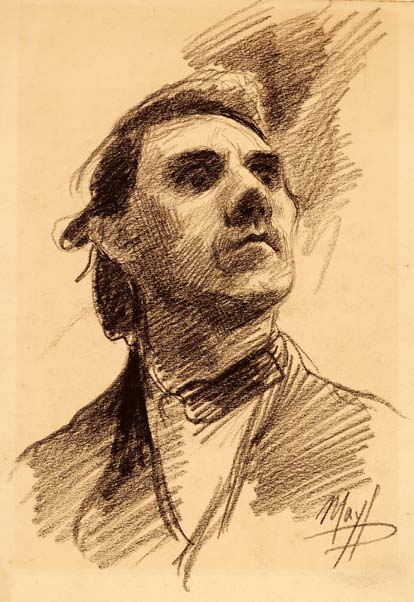
Alexander John Drysdale by Robert Bledsoe Mayfield 1892

Alexander John Drysdale (1870–1934) was an early 20th-century artist who specialized in landscapes of Louisiana using the technique of oil wash, that gave his works a characteristic hazy look. Drysdale made use of this technique by diluting the oil paint with kerosene and applying it to the canvas board with cotton balls. Drysdale was prolific, having painted an estimated 10,000 works.

== Early life and training ==
Drysdale was born in Marietta, Georgia, and initially pursued art as a sideline. As a young adult in New Orleans, he worked as a banker while taking art classes at night at the Southern Art Union. This gave Drysdale the opportunity to study with the leading artists of the time in New Orleans, including Paul E. Poincy. He studied with the Art Students League in New York City beginning in 1901. There he had associations with artists George Inness, Robert Henri, William Merritt Chase, and others.

== Artistic career ==
The start of his professional life as an artist coincided with his move to New Orleans in 1903. At that time, he became heavily involved in the Artists' Association of New Orleans. He established his studio at 320 Exchange Place in the New Orleans French Quarter. Significant commissions included D.H. Holmes Department Store and Sushan Airport, as well as showings at Tulane University and the National Association of Newspaper Artists. In later life, Drysdale was partially supported by the Civil Works Administration. Today his art can be viewed at the New Orleans Museum of Art, the Ogden Museum of Southern Art, and The Historic New Orleans Collection.

A detailed biography of Drysdale was published in 1985.

== Gallery ==
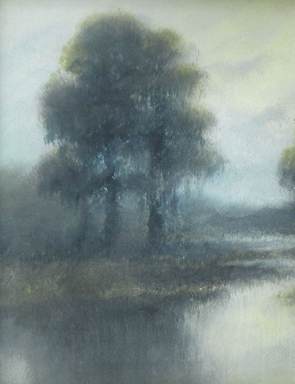
Alexander John Drysdale, pastel on paper, Louisiana bayou landscape

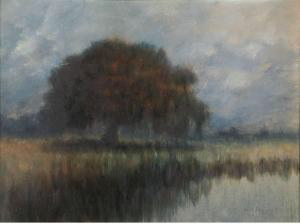
Drysdale Alexander John-Oak on the Lower Coast of the Mississippi 1912

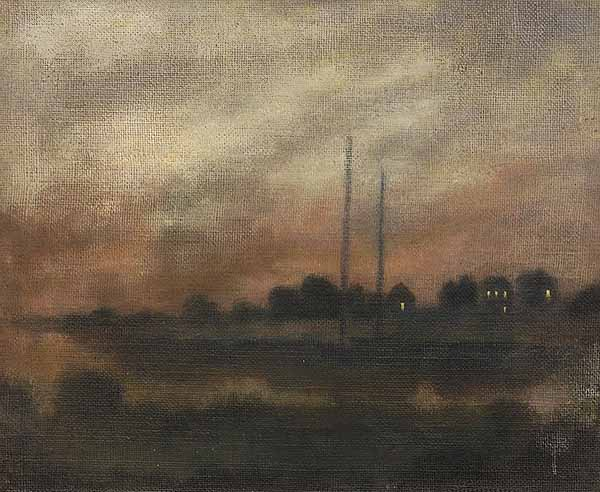
Twilight on the Bayou by A J Drysdale 1906

== Bibliography ==
- Alexander John Drysdale, AskArt.com, accessed March 1, 2013.
- Who Was Who in American Art, 1564-1975 : 400 years of artists in America, Peter Hastings Falk, editor-in-chief. Sound View Press, 1999, ISBN 0-932087-57-4.
- Dobie, Ann. "Alexander Drysdale." In KnowLA Encyclopedia of Louisiana, edited by David Johnson. Louisiana Endowment for the Humanities, 2010- . Article published September 04, 2012.
- Buechner, Howard A. Drysdale (1870-1934) Artist of Myth and Legend, Thunderbird Press, 1985, ISBN 0-913159-03-4.
