= Robert Bledsoe Mayfield =

Artist in late 19th century and early 20th century

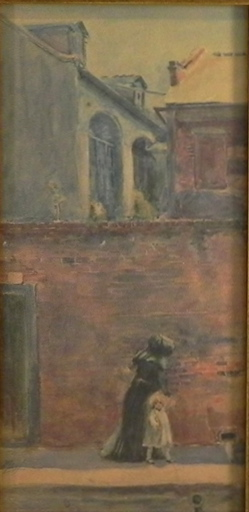
- Woman and Child in the French Quarter by Robert Bledsoe Mayfield
- Born: January 1, 1869; Carlinville, Illinois
- Died: December 4, 1934 (aged 65); New Orleans, Louisiana
- Known for: Portraits, Landscapes, Architectural scenes in oil and etchings
- Awards: Art Association of New Orleans; Gold Medal 1908

Robert Bledsoe Mayfield (January 1, 1869 - December 4, 1934) was an American artist known primarily for his landscapes, interiors, and etchings. His artistic career was spent mostly in New Orleans, Louisiana. Many of Mayfield's paintings on canvas reside at the New Orleans Museum of Art.

== Early life and training ==
Mayfield was born in Carlinville, Illinois on January 1, 1869. His artistic training was at the St. Louis School of Fine Arts and subsequently the Julian Academy in Paris under Lefebvre and Constant. Luc-Olivier Merson also mentored him.

== Artistic career ==
Mayfield spent the majority of his artistic career in New Orleans, Louisiana. In 1908 he was awarded the first gold medal of the New Orleans Art Association. Notable works include "In the Studio" and "The Giant Oak" which are displayed in the New Orleans Museum of Art. He served for a time on the museum's committee for painting and sculpture and was an executive committee member for the New Orleans Art Association, where he displayed some of his work. Mayfield also served as associate editor of art for the New Orleans Times-Picayune.

== Gallery ==
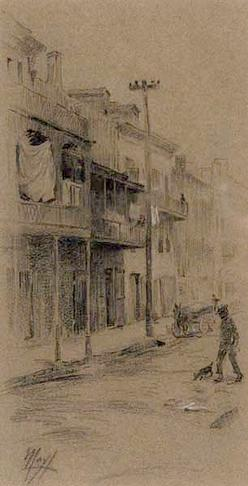
Where Dwelt the Aristocracy Vieux Carre Robert Bledsoe Mayfield

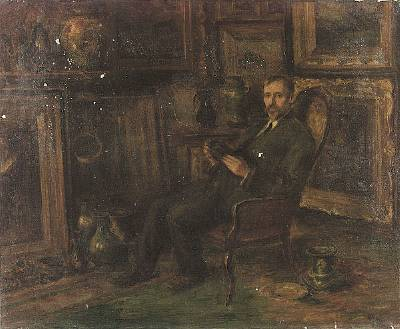
Dr Isaac Monroe Cline at Home 1910 by Robert Bledsoe Mayfield

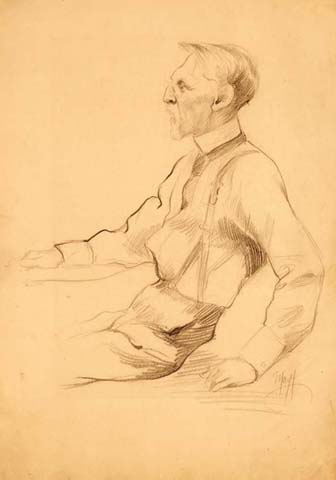
Caricature of Ellsworth Woodward by Robert Bledsoe Mayfield 1892
