= Native American Fish and Wildlife Society =

US non-profit organization

The Native American Fish and Wildlife Society (NAFWS) is a non-profit organization and is a national tribal organization in the United States established informally during the early 1980s. NAFWS was incorporated in 1983 to develop a national communications network for the exchange of information and management techniques related to self-determined tribal fish and wildlife management.

== History ==
At the beginning of the 1970s and early 1980s, many Native American tribes in the United States began to take a more proactive approach to the management of their natural resources, especially fish and wildlife resources. This was prompted by the increase of tourism on reservation lands which included recreational opportunities like hunting and fishing. This was set into motion by legislation established by Congress, Public Law 93-638, better known as the Indian Self-Determination and Education Assistance Act. This was followed by several legal cases, including New Mexico v. Mescalero Apache Tribe, Washington v. Confederated Tribes of the Colville Indian Reservation and White Mountain Apache Tribe v. Bracker, that were heard by the Supreme Court, which recognized the Tribes sovereignty and jurisdictional right to manage their own fish and wildlife resources within reservation exterior boundaries. These rights continue to be contested in various forms by the State and Federal governments today.

These actions led to the formation of a national organization, established to assist tribes in the development and protection of Indian fish and wildlife resources. The Society was founded in 1982 prompted by a few dedicated individuals who came together in July 1981 on the Warm Springs Reservation to attend a Tribal Fish and Wildlife Workshop sponsored by the Native Tribe and the Bureau of Indian Affairs. It was there that several individuals, among them Nathan "Eight Ball" Jim, Gerald "Buzz" Cobell, Herschel Mays, Doug Dompier, Phillip Stago, Jr., John Antonio, John Smith, Levi George, Butch Blazer and others, were instrumental in coming up with the strategy to develop a national organization now known as the Native American Fish and Wildlife Society (NAFWS). Buzz Cobell organized the first national meeting in Great Falls, Montana in 1982. The Blackfeet Tribe hosted the national Indian/Eskimo Fish and Wildlife conference. This meeting provided the nucleus and impetus for the first Society meeting, whereby the first Board of Directors were elected. Mr. Cobell was elected the Society's first President. Eight others to serve in that capacity since then: John Smith, John Antonio, Patricia Zakovec, Don Sampson, Ron Skates, Butch Blazer, Matthew "Cully" Vanderhoop and Joe Jay Pinkham III. Alongside its line of presidents, the society has had five Executive Directors since 1982. These include; Dewey Schwalenberg, Ella Mulford, Ken Poynter, Ira Newbreast and Donald "Fred" Matt.

== Regions and Land Base ==
Today there are seven regions of the Society which include: Pacific, Southwest, Great Plains, Great Lakes, Northeast, Southeast, and Alaska—which was the last region to join the Society in 1992. The Society was founded on the knowledge that without wild animals, life would be deprived and demeaned, that they move the people through the great mystery of creation. Federally-recognized Indian tribes within the lower 48 United States have jurisdiction over a reservation land base of more than 52 million acres, or 81,250 square miles. Alaskan Native lands comprise another 45 million acres. To many Native Americans, this land provides a religious, cultural, and economic subsistence base. This base is being utilized by both Indians and non-Indians for recreation purposes. They also contain habitats that are critical to the recovery of various species listed as threatened or endangered.

== Mission ==
The NAFWS's mission as a non-profit organization is to assist where possible the Tribes/Native Villages of Alaska with protection, preservation and to enhance the wise use of Native American fish and wildlife resources and associated habitats. The Society's purposes are charitable, educational, scientific and cultural. The primary purposes are as follows:

- Assist in the facilitation and coordination of intertribal communications in regards to fish and wildlife matters including treaty rights issues
- Court cases that may have an adverse impacts on the management of tribal fish
- Wildlife and hunting/fishing regulations
- Educate Native Americans involved in fish and wildlife management
- Inform policy decision makers and other natural resource managers of the best management practices
- Provide administrative support expertise and advice to tribal governments as it relates to fish and wildlife and recreation resources
- Improve the general welfare of tribal people through education and technical assistance
- Provide professional publications, promotional activities and conferences that provide a forum for disseminating information to society members and other non-Indian organizations, public officials and the general public.

== Funding ==
The primary funding source for the Society comes from annual appropriations from Congress that are administered through various federal agencies. However, the Society also relies on funding from many sources that are non-governmental which include private and membership contributions. The society is an organization that is membership driven, with 1300 plus individual members and many tribes that are associate members.

== Activities ==
Several promotional videos have been released to help the society in their outreach efforts, including "Our Native American Wildlife Heritage" (1987), "Circle of Life" (1992) and "Keepers of the Circle" in (1994). Training and education are also significant focuses of the society. The "Youth Practicum" was officially started in 1991 by Sally Carufel Williams. Many students have gone through the program, and quite a few of them have gotten involved in tribal natural resource management and other students have gone on to become tribal leaders in their own right. The society has also offered many training programs, including: law enforcement, fish and wildlife management, chronic wasting disease, VHS, and avian influenza. The society most recently has hired its own biologists who provide much of the training and technical assistance concerning disease issues and other request for fish and wildlife management where possible.

In the early 1990s, the Society went to Congress to seek funding for a bison initiative that would help bring Tribes together in their efforts to re-establish bison herds are their lands. In 1991 several society board members and tribal bison managers held a meeting on how to better accomplish this. In 1992 the first funding was provided to the society for the development of an Inter-Tribal Bison Cooperative (ITBC).

Participating tribes are in a unique situation because their advancing tribal natural resources agenda are often met with issues such as pressures for land development, threatened treaty rights, overlapping jurisdictions, and tribes losing land base. In order to address these issues, a group of Intertribal natural resource organizations have pulled together to host a tribal natural resource conference.

In 1993, member tribes of the Society banded together to acquire funding of their natural resource management offices through legislation. The Native American Fish and Wildlife Society took the lead in this fight. H.R. 2874 was introduced into the House of Representatives. The bill was entitled "Indian Fish and Wildlife Resource Enhancement Act of 1993". The bill aimed to reaffirm and protect Indian hunting, fishing, and gathering rights and to provide for the conservation, prudent management, enhancement, orderly development and use of the resource. It would also maximize tribal capability and flexibility in managing fish and wildlife resources for the continuing benefit of Indian people. A management component was developed under the bill. The bill passed through the House of Representative. It was then introduce in 1994 on the Senate side under S. 1526 under the title "Indian Fish and Wildlife Resource Management Act of 1994". The states showed up in full force to oppose the bill. Their main contention is that the monies generated from the Pittman–Robertson Act and the Dingell–Johnson Act (PRDJ) would be used for these programs under the bill. PRDJ is an excise tax on the purchase of all equipment for hunting, fishing, hiking, and camping. The funds are divvied out to the natural resource department in each state and US territory and is separated according to the land mass of each state and territory. The tribes contend that since the states use tribal reservations to calculate total land mass that the tribes deserve a cut of the funds for their natural resource departments. The bill was tabled in the Senate.
