= John Geldersma =

American artist

John Geldersma (born October 16, 1942, in New Orleans, Louisiana) is known for his wooden sculptures of what he calls "contemporary tribalism".

== Life ==
Geldersma earned a BFA from the University of Louisiana at Lafayette (then known as the University of Southwestern Louisiana) and a MFA from Rutgers, the State University of New Jersey. The artist has cited his early immersion in the intersection of such divergent cultures as French, Spanish, African-American, Caribbean, British, and Native American as a major influence on his art. Geldersma divides his time between his native Louisiana and Colorado.

== Works ==
Geldersma began carving totems and masks in 1970, inspired by African art.

His Spirit Poles are carved, smooth, minimalist, vertical, wooden poles with tapered ends, usually three or more feet long, some on bases. Geldersma works with aspen, pecan, weathered driftwood, and salvaged wood to create totemic poles, cairns, and tablets. Gelderma has said he makes the pieces with eyes at eye level to give viewers a sense of "confrontation and connection".

The artist's creative process involves studying the wood and its twists and turns. The original shape of the wood often dictates how the totem will ultimately look. Beginning with the raw material, Geldersma first removes the bark with a knife and then works the piece of wood with a chainsaw to get the rough shape. Using increasingly smaller tools, from grinders to sandpaper and steel wool, Geldersma works the wood into his desired form. He then applies color either by painting the totems in bands of colors or by burning them to achieve blacks.

== Selected solo exhibitions ==
- 2013 Variations, Chiaroscuro Contemporary Art, Santa Fe
- 2009 Presence of Spirit, Acadiana Center for the Arts, Lafayette, Louisiana
- 2007 Zeitgeist Gallery, Nashville, Tennessee
- 2006 Arthur Roger Gallery, New Orleans, Louisiana
- 2005 S.O.F.A, courtesy of Jean Albano Gallery, Chicago, Illinois
- 1998 Marguerite Oesteicher Fine Art, New Orleans, Louisiana
- 1997 Retrospective Exhibition, Masur Museum of Art, Monroe, Louisiana
- 1996 Hotel díVille, Surrenne, France
- 1996 R. Treger Gallerie, Paris, France
- 1996 Cline LewAllen Contemporary, Santa Fe, New Mexico
- 1995 Butters Gallery Ltd., Portland, Oregon
- 1993 Gasperi Gallery, New Orleans, Louisiana
- 1992 Mill Street Gallery, Aspen, Colorado
- 1991 Willougby Sharp Gallery, New York, New York
- 1991 Artworks Gallery, Seattle, Washington
- 1989 Duplantier Gallery, New Orleans, Louisiana
- 1989 LewAllen/Butler Fine Arts, Santa Fe, New Mexico
- 1988 Primitivist Sculpture: John Geldersma, Art Museum of Southeast Texas, Beaumont, Texas
- 1987 Via Serpents, University Art Museum, Lafayette, Louisiana
- 1977 Memphis Art Academy, Memphis, Tennessee
- 1967 Rutgers, The State University, New Brunswick, New Jersey
- 1965 Fine Arts Gallery, The University of Southwestern, Louisiana, Lafayette, Louisiana

== Selected group exhibitions ==
- 2012 Totems & Talismans, ENO Gallery, †Hillsboro, North Carolina
- 2011 NEWMEXORADO, Harwood Museum of Art, Taos, New Mexico
- 2001 Artists of S.O.F.A., Jean Albano Gallery, Chicago, Illinois
- 2000 Under the Influence: Artists Respond to the Twentieth Century, Contemporary Arts Center, New Orleans, Louisiana
- Five From Louisiana, Center for Fine and Performing Arts, Pensacola, Florida
- 1999 Winter Group Exhibition, J. Cotter Gallery, Beaver Creek, Colorado
- McLaren Markowitz Gallery, Boulder, Colorado
- 1996 Gallerie R. Teger, Paris, France
- 1995 Anne Reed Gallery, Ketchum, Idaho
- 1993 The Bayou Biennial, BCís 313 Gallery, New York, New York
- 1992 Tory Folliard Gallery, Milwaukie, Wisconsin
- 1991 Tory Folliard Gallery, Milwaukie, Wisconsin
- Born on the Bayou: Celebrating Arts of Louisiana, CBís 313 Gallery, New York, New York
- 1990 Art in the Garden VIII, American Crafts Gallery, Cleveland, Ohio
- 1987 Return to Eden: John Geldersma and David Butler, Todd Capp Gallery, New York, New York
- 1986 Visual Arts: The Southeast 1986, One Securities Center, Georgia State University, Georgia
- 1984 The Third Coast Exhibition, Art League of Houston Gallery, Houston, Texas
- 1983 A Collection-A Collector: The Norman Fischer Collection, Jacksonville Art Museum, Jacksonville, Florida
- 1980 First Louisiana Biennial Sculpture Invitational, Contemporary Arts Center, New Orleans, Louisiana
- 1977 Fetishes, 112 Greene Street, New York, New York
- Ninth Annual Invitational, Oklahoma Art Center, Oklahoma City, Oklahoma
- 1976 Louisiana Bien Amis, Louisiana Bicentennial Exhibition, Paris, France
- 1973 Louisiana Craft Council Exhibition, New Orleans, Louisiana
- 1966 Avant Garde Annual Exhibition, Central Park, New York, New York
- 1965 Twenty-Third Annual Southeastern Competition, Atlanta, Georgia
- 1964 Louisiana State Annual Competition, Baton Rouge, Louisiana
- 1963 Annual Competition Sponsored by the American Association of University Women, Dallas, Texas
