= Native American policy of the Nixon administration =

U.S. federal policies toward Native Americans, 1969–1974

From 1969 to 1974, the Richard Nixon administration made important changes to United States policy towards Native Americans through legislation and executive action. President Richard Nixon advocated a reversal of the long-standing policy of "termination" that had characterized relations between the U.S. federal government and American Indians in favor of "self-determination." The Alaska Native Claims Settlement Act restructured indigenous governance in Alaska, creating a unique structure of Native Corporations. Some of the most notable instances of American Indian activism occurred under the Nixon Administration, including the Occupation of Alcatraz and the Occupation of Wounded Knee.

== Termination policy ==
Before the 1950s, Native American tribes were considered semi-autonomous nations with complete governance over their own territory. Such autonomy allowed tribes to organize a tribal government, legislate and adjudicate, determine tribal membership, levy and collect taxes, enforce tribal laws, and control development of tribal resources. However, the United States' Indian policy gradually shifted over the course of the twentieth century. The federal government began to take a more involved role in the affairs of previously autonomous Indian tribes, and total assimilation of the Indians became the government's new policy line. In 1934, Congress passed the Indian Reorganization Act which sought to reorganize tribal systems of governance into forms foreign to Indians. Simultaneously, under the Indian Reorganization Act, the Bureau of Indian Affairs (BIA) began to gain approval power over Indian constitutions, resource development, and cultural activities. A new era of assimilation characterized relations between the United States and Indians. This evolution of policy was formally codified into law with the passage of House Concurrent Resolution 108 and Public Law 280 in 1953.

=== House Concurrent Resolution 108 ===
House concurrent resolution 108 ( H. Con. Res. 108) is often perceived as the formal codification of the termination policy of the United States. Passed by the 83rd Congress on August 1, 1953, the resolution sought to abolish tribal autonomy and subject Indians to the same laws as citizens of the United States. Furthermore, House Concurrent Resolution 108 opened the sale of tribal lands to non-Indians.

Whereas it is the policy of Congress as rapidly as possible, to make the Indians within the territorial limits of the United States subject to the same laws and entitled to the same privileges and responsibilities as are applicable to other citizens of the United States, and to grant them all of the rights and prerogatives pertaining to American citizenship; and whereas the Indians within the territorial limits of the United States should assume their full responsibilities as American citizens.

=== Public Law 280 ===
Public Law 280 (PL-280), which passed on August 15, 1953, supplemented the tenets and policies outlined in H. Con. Res. 108. Public Law 280 sought to transfer criminal jurisdiction over crimes committed by Indians in "Indian Country" to certain state governments. Previously, "Indian Country" was under the jurisdiction of the federal criminal code. Congress gave six states (California, Minnesota, Nebraska, Oregon, Wisconsin, and Alaska) extensive authority to prosecute most crimes that occurred in Indian country. Between 1953 and 1968, numerous other states exercised expanded jurisdiction in Indian country. Not only did PL-280 strip the federal government of jurisdiction in Indian country, but it also nullified traditional tribal systems of internal justice.

=== Efforts towards repeal under Presidents Kennedy and Johnson ===
The federal government's policy of termination was met with staunch opposition from Indian populations. What had been initiated as an attempt at assimilation into American society had evolved into a systematic removal of Indian autonomy. Upon taking office in 1961, President John F. Kennedy sought to gradually repeal the termination policy of the 1950s due to problems surrounding multiple ancestral land ownership patterns. Kennedy scaled back the tenets of the termination era through a series of legislative actions.

- Public Law 87-273, approved on September 22, 1961, increased to $7.5 million the annual authorization to carry out a vocational training program for American Indians residing on or near Indian reservations.
- Public Law 88-168, approved on November 4, 1963, established a $900,000 revolving loan fund for the Secretary of the Interior to make loans to Indian tribes for the services of expert researchers and witnesses in prosecuting their cases before the Indian Claims Commission.
- S. 1049, passed by the Senate on October 11, 1963, provided the Secretary of the Interior with the authority to reduce the rapidly increasing number of Indian allotments in multiple ownership.

President Lyndon B. Johnson furthered Kennedy's efforts to end the policy of termination. In an address to Congress on March 6, 1968, President Johnson emphasized the necessity of self-determination and improved living conditions for Indians in the United States. However, Johnson's program to provide Indians with equal standards of living to Americans quickly lost traction in Congress. Johnson's reform efforts did reap some substantial results. In 1968, the National Council on Indian Opportunity was established to encourage and coordinate the rise of federal programs to benefit the American Indian population, appraise the impact and progress of such programs, and to suggest ways to improve the programs to meet the needs and desires of the Indian population. The National Council on Indian Opportunity was terminated in 1974.

== The Nixon years (1969–1974) ==
=== The Nixon administration ===
Richard Nixon took office as president in 1969. It was under his administration that Washington state Senator Henry M. Jackson and Senate Subcommittee on Indian Affairs aide Forrest J. Gerard were most active in their reform efforts. The work of Jackson and Gerard mirrored the demands of Indians for "self-determination." Nixon called for an end to termination and provided a direct endorsement of "self-determination."

=== Special message to Congress on Indian Affairs ===
In a 1970 address to Congress, Nixon articulated his vision of self-determination. He explained, "The time has come to break decisively with the past and to create the conditions for a new era in which the Indian future is determined by Indian acts and Indian decisions." Nixon continued, "This policy of forced termination is wrong, in my judgment, for a number of reasons. First, the premises on which it rests are wrong. Termination implies that the federal government has taken on a trusteeship responsibility for Indian communities as an act of generosity toward a disadvantaged people and that it can therefore discontinue this responsibility on a unilateral basis whenever it sees fit." Nixon's overt renunciation of the long-standing termination policy was the first of any President in the post-World War II era.

=== Henry M. Jackson and Forrest J. Gerard ===
In 1971, Senator Henry M. Jackson, Chairman of the Committee on Interior and Insular Affairs, hired Forrest J. Gerard. Gerard was born on Montana's Blackfeet Reservation in 1925, served in the United States Air Force in World War II, and received a college education on the G.I. Bill. Following college, he worked for agencies in Montana and Wyoming before moving to Washington, D.C. to work for the Indian Health Service. Eventually, Gerard would work for the Bureau of Indian Affairs and Health and Human Services. Gerard would provide Jackson with the experience and network of relationships with tribal leaders necessary for serious policy reform.

Together, Jackson and Gerard worked hard to put the policies of self-determination outlined by Kennedy and Johnson into action. Beginning with Jackson's call for a Senate resolution to reverse House Concurrent Resolution 108, they embarked on an ambitious legislative agenda to reform Indian affairs in the United States. The legislation regarding Indian Affairs that bears the authorship of Senator Jackson and Gerard, and the sponsorship of Senator Jackson includes:

- Senate Concurrent Resolution 26, enacted in 1971 to reverse the federal policy of termination and develop a government-wide commitment to enable Indians to determine their own future, protect Indian property and identity, raise the social and economic level of Indians, and assist urban Indians.
- Indian Health Care Improvement Act (IHCIA), enacted in 1976 to address the deplorable living conditions in Indian Country.
- Indian Self-Determination and Education Assistance Act, enacted in 1975, it authorized the secretaries of the Interior, Health, and Education to enter into contracts under which the tribes themselves would assume responsibility for the administration of federal Indian programs.
- Sub-Marginal Lands Act, enacted in 1975 to declare that certain submarginal land of the United States, purchased in the 1930s, be held in trust for certain Indian tribes and be made a part of the reservation for said Indians.
- Indian Finance Act, passed in 1975 with the sponsorship of Senator Jackson, was a proposal of President Nixon's to lend money to tribes via a revolving fund.

=== Alaskan Native claims ===
In 1959, Alaska became the 49th U.S. state. However, prior to and after the passage of the Alaska Statehood Act, indigenous claims were seen as contrary to goals of development. The 1968 discovery of North Slope oil was a dramatic development that demanded immediate conflict resolution over Indian land claims. However, the Alaska Statehood Act provided the new State with the entitlement to pursue land grants. Furthermore, the state and federal government embarked on a project to create a pipeline to transport oil from the North Slope fields. The vast majority of Alaskan Natives did not live on reservations but rather in scattered villages. As the State of Alaska began to select lands pursuant to the Statehood Act, native villages protested to the Secretary of the Interior that the lands chosen were occupied and used for aboriginal purposes.

Senator Jackson desired an immediate resolution to the issue of land claims. In 1966, the Alaskan Federation of Natives (AFN) was formed. Composed of 400 Alaskan Natives representing 17 Native organizations, the AFN would work to achieve the passage of a just and fair land settlement. Natives who were younger and more educated formed the core of the AFN leadership, and they desired to keep a portion of their aboriginal lands. In 1968, Senator Jackson traveled to Anchorage for a public hearing with AFN members and the Native community. Ultimately, Senator Jackson concluded that land grants and trusteeship would not be enough for native leadership. In response, Congress presented the Alaska Native Claims Settlement Act (ANCSA). The ANCSA was designed to rectify disproportionate State land claims by transferring land titles to twelve Alaska Native regional corporations and over 200 local village corporations. True to his commitment to "self-determination", prior to signing the ANCSA into law in 1971, President Nixon sought to ensure that the measure was supported by the AFN.

== American Indian protest movements ==
The late 1960s were not only a time of significant policy change in regard to American Indians but also a period of major advocacy. Mirroring the Civil Rights movement, protests against the Vietnam War, and the counterculture as a whole, American Indian protests movements blossomed during this decade.

=== The occupation of Alcatraz Island ===
Although Nixon was responsible for the direction of his Indian policy, the implementation and specifics were largely carried out by his White House staff. However, in 1969, Nixon was forced to involve himself in an unforeseen crisis. In an effort to protest a policy of terminating Indian reservations and relocating inhabitants to urban areas, a group of American Indians boated to the abandoned island of Alcatraz in the San Francisco Bay. The occupiers, calling themselves "Indians of All Tribes," were led by Richard Oakes, a Native American and student at San Francisco State College. The vast majority of his companions were Native American university students.

The White House refused to cave to the protesters but would not forcibly remove them either. Rather, the Nixon administration sought to respond through increased reform efforts in regard to Indian policy. The occupation lasted until 1971. In that time period, President Nixon signed 52 Congressional legislative measures on behalf of American Indians to support tribal self-rule. In addition, President Nixon increased the BIA budget by 225 percent, doubled funds for Indian health care, and established the Office of Indian Water Rights. However, the primary concerns of the "Indians of All Tribes" were not addressed. The administration insisted that urban Indians form federally-recognized tribes, and use regular social service from the state and local agencies, not the BIA. President Nixon's inability to effectively reform the BIA would result in increased Indian activism and protest.

=== Standoff at Wounded Knee ===
The policy of President Nixon created a schism in the Indian leadership. Radical urban groups such as the American Indian Movement (AIM) actively opposed the BIA. In 1972, AIM members occupied the BIA building in Washington, D.C. Adopting once again a policy of restraint, the Nixon administration negotiated with the AIM for their peaceful departure. The elected tribal leaders disagreed with the tactics of civil disobedience employed by AIM. They viewed AIM as a destructive organization, while AIM perceived tribal leaders as weak and unfit to provide substantial change. This conflict came to a head in 1973 when 200 members of AIM converged on Wounded Knee at the Pine Ridge Reservation in South Dakota. The conflict at Wounded Knee led to the impeachment of the Oglala Lakota (Sioux) tribal chairman, Richard Wilson, who was considered corrupt by many elders and traditional members of the tribe, including those associated with AIM. Furthermore, AIM leaders disliked the existing tribal government because it had been established under the IRA of 1934. AIM took Wounded Knee by force and proclaimed an independent Sioux nation. In response, Richard Wilson threatened to invade Wounded Knee and violently eject all AIM members. U.S. Marshals, FBI agents, and BIA police were deployed to Pine Ridge Reservation to defuse the situation. However, the standoff would continue for another three months until negotiations between President Nixon's representative, Leonard Garment, and AIM leaders, Dennis Banks and Carter Camp, reached an agreement. The occupiers surrendered their arms in exchange for an investigation of Wilson's management of the Pine Ridge Reservation. Once more, the Nixon administration had used restraint and patience in a potentially violent situation.

The Nixon administration hardened its policy toward AIM in the wake of the standoff at Wounded Knee. At the same time, Nixon's relative progressivism toward Indian affairs became stronger. Between 1973 and 1975, Congress, with the help of Senator Jackson, passed a series of significant reforms to U.S. Indian policy.
