= Salazar v. Ramah Navajo Chapter =

- Supreme Court of the United States

Argued April 18, 2012 Decided June 18, 2012
- Full case name: Ken L. Salazar, Secretary of the Interior, et al. v. Ramah Navajo Chapter, et al.
- Docket no.: 11-551
- Citations: 567 U.S. 182 (more) 132 S. Ct. 2181; 183 L. Ed. 2d 186; 2012 U.S. LEXIS 4656; 80 U.S.L.W. 4475; 23 Fla. L. Weekly Fed. S 386; 2012 WL 2196799

Case history
- Prior: Ramah Navajo Chapter v. Lujan, 112 F.3d 1455 (10th Cir. 1997); Ramah Navajo Chapter v. Babbitt, 50 F. Supp. 2d 1091 (D.N.M. 1999); Ramah Navajo Chapter v. Norton, 250 F. Supp. 2d 1303 (D.N.M. 2002); Ramah Navajo Chapter v. Salazar, 644 F.3d 1054 (10th Cir. 2011)

Holding
- The United States government, when it enters into a contract with a Native American Indian tribe for services, must pay contracts in full so long as funds are available, regardless of whether sufficient funds are available to pay all such contracts.

Court membership
- Chief Justice John Roberts Associate Justices Antonin Scalia · Anthony Kennedy; Clarence Thomas · Ruth Bader Ginsburg; Stephen Breyer · Samuel Alito; Sonia Sotomayor · Elena Kagan

Case opinions
- Majority: Sotomayor, joined by Scalia, Kennedy, Thomas, Kagan
- Dissent: Roberts, joined by Ginsburg, Breyer, Alito

Laws applied
- 25 U.S.C. §§ 450j–450l

Salazar v. Ramah Navajo Chapter, 567 U.S. 182 (2012), was a United States Supreme Court case in which the Court held that the United States government, when it enters into a contract with a Native American Indian tribe for services, must pay contracts in full, even if Congress has not appropriated enough money to pay all tribal contractors. The case was litigated over a period of 22 years, beginning in 1990, until it was decided in 2012.

== Background ==
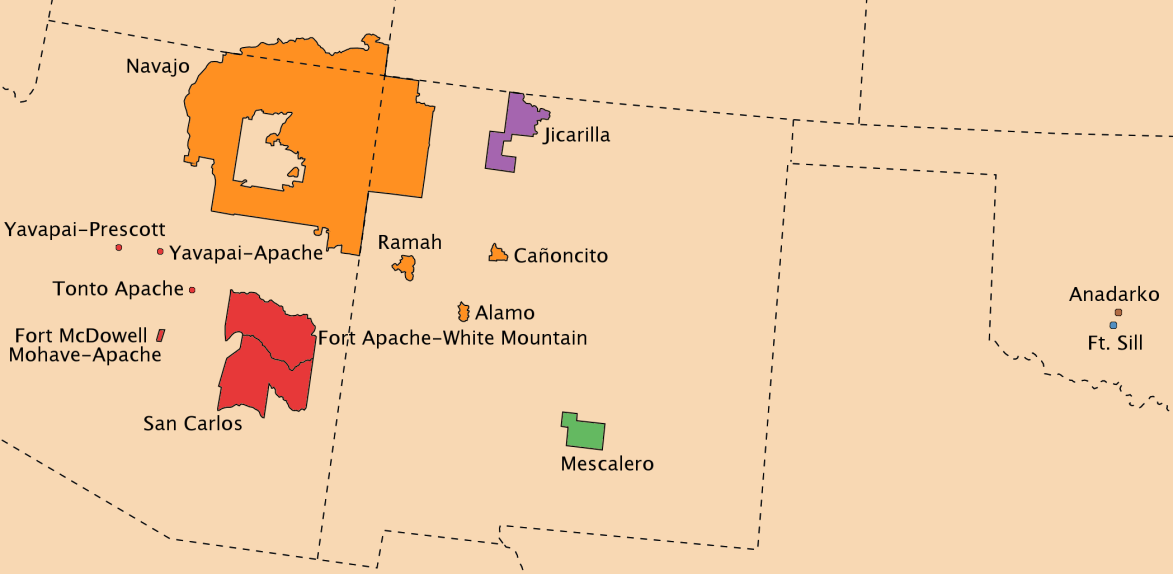
Location of Ramah Navajo Indian Reservation (Navajo reservations shown by orange color; green, red, and purple are Apache.)

The Ramah Navajo Chapter is a political subdivision of the Navajo tribe that resides on the Ramah Navajo Indian Reservation in the western part of New Mexico, just east and southeast of the Zuni Indian Reservation. This is the eastern part of the Navajo Nation, which extends westward into Arizona and Utah. The Navajo Nation is divided into five "Agencies" and further sub-divided into "Chapters", which are comparable with county governments. The Navajo Nation has approximately 300,000 enrolled members. The Ramah Chapter, due to its location, is the only Navajo Chapter with its own Bureau of Indian Affairs (BIA) agency and a semi-autonomous government. "[T]he Ramah Navajos played a leadership role in defending indigenous self-determination efforts in the United States", beginning with the establishment of a reservation school over the protests of local non-Indians. (Note: The local white, predominately Mormon, community opposed the establishment of the school by writing numerous letters to the BIA, and then attempting to impose state taxes on the construction of the school. In 1982, the Chapter successfully took the matter to the Supreme Court in Ramah Navajo School Board, Inc. v. Bureau of Revenue of New Mexico.)

=== Legislative background ===
In 1975, Congress passed the Indian Self-Determination and Education Assistance Act (IDEAA). IDEAA authorized the Secretary of the Interior and the Secretary of Health and Human Services to contract with Native American tribes to take over services that had, in the past, been provided by the BIA and the Indian Health Service (IHS), among others. The stated intent of IDEAA was to improve tribal self-determination in planning and managing federally funded programs for tribal members. The Secretary of the Interior was responsible for administering these contracts out of monies appropriated by Congress. (Note: Although Congress appropriated funds for the contracts, Congress did not provide sufficient funds to administer all of the contracts. The Secretary of the Interior therefore paid funds on a pro rata basis, funding all contracting tribes at a level between 77-92% of the amount due to them under the contract.) The contracts required two parts, first the direct cost of the program being administered by the tribe, and second, indirect costs of administering the program, subject to funds being appropriated by Congress. (Note: The government has developed standards to allow agencies to identify proper indirect costs, those were published in Office of Management and Budget Circular A-87, 2 C.F.R. pt. 225 (2005).) When there were shortfalls in the amounts paid by BIA to the tribe, the agency would underpay the tribe for indirect costs, forcing the tribes to cut services to tribal members to pay the indirect costs.

=== Procedural history ===
In 1989, the Ramah Navajo Chapter had five contracts with the BIA to administer programs relating to real estate, natural resources, law enforcement, the Aid to Tribal Government program, and water rights programs. (Note: Direct costs for the five programs totaled $755,770.) Additionally, the Chapter had two contracts with the State of New Mexico to administer a juvenile justice restitution program and a criminal justice program. (Note: The two state programs were funded by grants from the U.S. Department of Justice at $62,927.) In determining the indirect costs to be reimbursed to the Chapter, the BIA used both the federal and state grants, which came to $336,317.65. This was about $28,000 less than the amount that would be reimbursed using only the BIA grants. The BIA used this method to artificially reduce the amount of indirect costs that it would have to pay to the tribes. (Note: Testimony before Congress stated that the BIA was willing to "reconsider" paying the contract support costs, but they have not done so.) Due to the dispute over indirect costs, the Chapter filed a contract appeal with the BIA in 1990. The BIA denied the appeal, noting even so that the Chapter was correct that including the state grants in the calculation was contrary to law. (Note: The ruling stated "taking account of a state grant's under-funding is contrary to Public Law 100-472, however, the inclusion of this under-funding by the Ramah Navajo Chapter from [fiscal year] 1987 would be shifting the cost of administering these state programs to the BIA which is contrary to [OMB Circular] A-87.")

==== District court ====
On October 4, 1990, the Chapter filed a lawsuit for breach of contract in the New Mexico Federal District Court. The suit asked for compensatory damages and injunctive relief, and for certification as a class action case. In 1993, the district court granted the United States summary judgment and denied the Chapter's motion for summary judgment. A final judgment was entered on October 19, 1994, and the Chapter appealed.

==== Circuit court of appeals ====
The appeal was heard by the Tenth Circuit Court of Appeals. The circuit court held that the 1988 amendment to IDEAA was intended to correct the chronic underfunding of BIA and IHS contracts with tribes, especially in regards to indirect costs. The circuit court noted that normally, when dealing with an ambiguous federal statute, courts will defer to the administrative agency charged with implementing the statute. Indian tribes are treated differently—the court noted that it has long been a principle of American jurisprudence that ambiguous statutes are to be construed in favor of the tribes. The circuit court ruled on May 8, 1997, that the government's interpretation of the statute was unreasonable, and reversed and remanded the case to the district court.

==== District court on remand ====
On remand, both the United States and the Chapter entered into settlement talks, eventually settling a portion of the claims. On May 25, 1999, the district court entered a final judgment on the partial settlement, finding for the Chapter and the other tribes in the class for $79,903,529 on the partial claim, $8,338,000 in attorney's fees, and $170,036 in costs. On December 6, 2002, the district court entered a final judgement on most of the remaining issues, finding for the Chapter and the other tribes in the class for $29,000,000 on the claims, $5,800,000 in attorney's fees, and $243,496 in costs. This narrowed the dispute to whether the plaintiff tribes (Note: The tribes joining the Ramah Chapter in the actual lawsuit were the Oglala Sioux and the Pueblo of Zuni tribes.) could collect on the underpaid amounts and the way the statute was interpreted. The district court granted summary judgment to the government, and the Chapter appealed.

==== Circuit court, second appeal ====
The circuit court noted that this was an issue on how the statute was to be interpreted. (Note: Specifically, the phrase "subject to the availability of appropriations" is at issue.) First, the court noted that the statute required the Secretary of the Interior to add the full amount of indirect, contract support costs to the contract. Beginning in 1994, Congress began to cap the total amount of funds that could be used for IDEAA contracts. This amount was insufficient to cover the contracts with all Indian tribes, but was sufficient to cover each individual contract that was entered into by BIA. The court noted that when construing a statute dealing with Indian tribes, the statute is to be construed to the favor of the tribe over the more general canon requiring deference to agency determinations. The court then held that since there were sufficient funds to pay each individual contract in full, the government was obligated to do so. The circuit court reversed and remanded the decision of the district court, ruling in favor of the Chapter.

== Supreme Court ==
The BIA appealed to the Supreme Court of the United States, which granted certiorari to hear the case in order to settle a circuit split. (Note: A circuit split is when two or more of the Court of Appeals have different, often opposing interpretations of law.)

=== Arguments of the parties ===
==== United States ====
The United States was represented by Mark R. Freeman, Assistant to the Solicitor General. Freeman argued that Congress had placed a cap on IDEAA contract funds beginning in 1994, and the BIA did not have the authority to spend more than the capped amount on all of the IDEAA contracts. Due to the lack of sufficient funding, the Secretary of the Interior has distributed the available funds on a pro rata basis among all of the IDEAA contracts. (Note: The BIA noted that this method was approved by both the D.C. Circuit and the Federal Circuit.) The United States also pointed out that the Constitution prohibits payments unless those payments have been appropriated or authorized by Congress. Freeman argued that the government's liability does not extend past the amount of money that Congress has appropriated for all of the contracts. The government also stated that the contract did not create a binding promise to pay the tribes the full amount of the contract.

==== Ramah Chapter ====
The Ramah Navajo Chapter was represented by Carter G. Phillips, who argued that this was a simple contract case to which the Ferris doctrine (Note: The Ferris doctrine comes from Ferris v. United States, which states that when the United States enters into a contract, the contractor is entitled to payment in full, even if the appropriations have been completely exhausted.) applied. The Chapter contracted with the United States to perform a service and completed its obligations, and the United States breached the contract by refusing to pay according to the terms of the contract. The statute, in addition to establishing that contract support costs were to be paid, also mandated the use of a model contract, reducing the BIA's ability to modify the terms of the contract. To allow the government to breach would be bad public policy, where no contractor to the government could be assured of receiving payment. Phillips noted that the statute was clear, and if it was not, the canons of statutory construction required that the ambiguity be resolved in the tribes favor.

==== Amicus curiae ====
Amicus curiae briefs were filed in support of the Chapter by the National Congress of American Indians (joined by the Coalition of Indian Tribes and Tribal Organizations), the Arctic Slope Native Association, and the Chamber of Commerce of the United States of America (joined by the National Defense Industrial Association). No amicus briefs were filed in support of the United States.

=== Opinion of the court ===
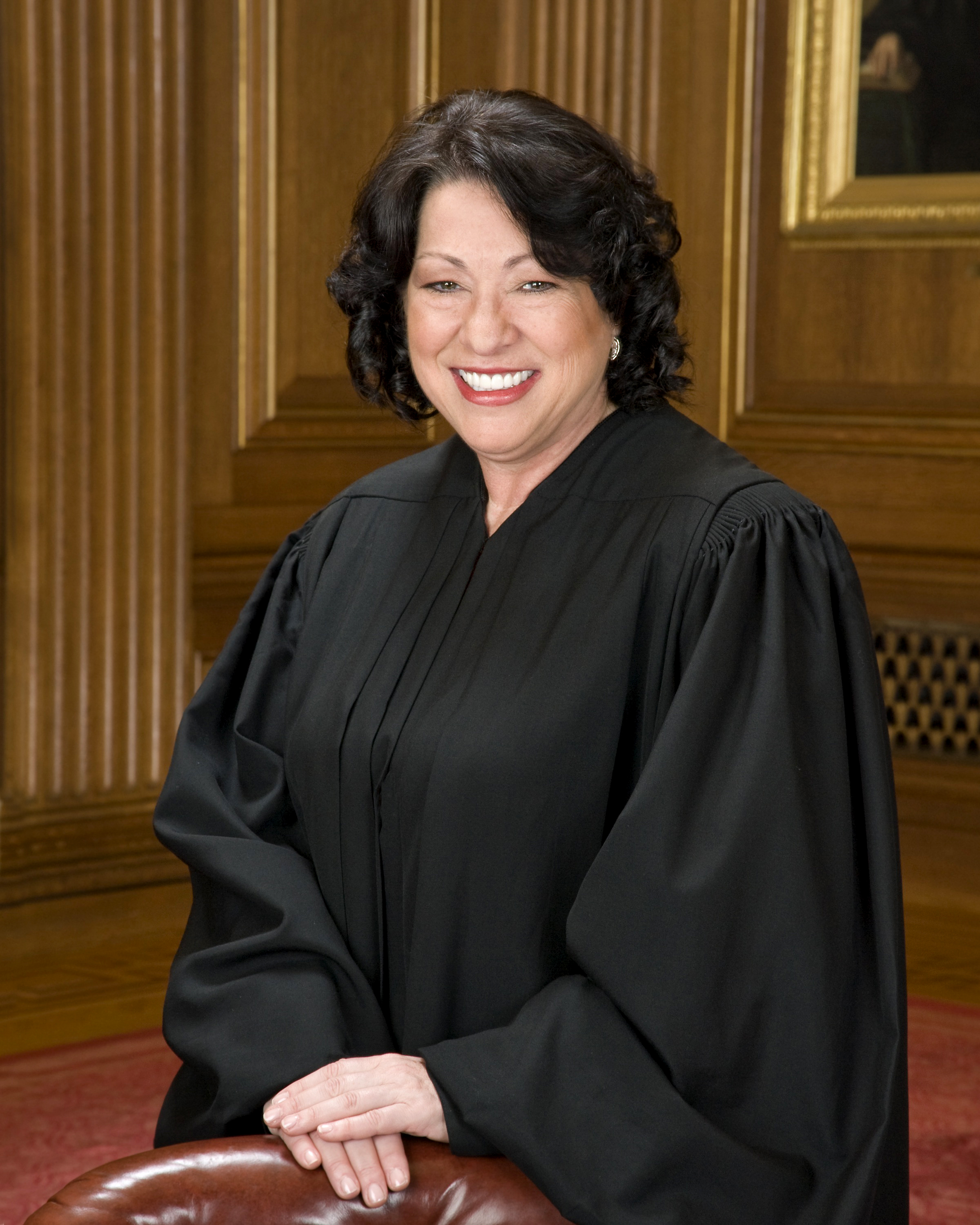
Justice Sonia Sotomayor, author of the majority opinion

Justice Sonia Sotomayor delivered the opinion of the Court. Sotomayor first noted that this was not a case of first impression, and that the court had ruled on a similar issue only seven years previously. Sotomayor stated that Cherokee Nation of Okla. v. Leavitt held that when the government makes a contractual promise to pay in return for services, the government is bound to pay for those services. This was a long-standing principle of contract law, dating back to Ferris, and the "principle safeguards both the expectations of Government contractors and the long-term fiscal interests of the United States." If the appropriation exceeds the amount of the individual contract, then the government is bound to honor the contract. Sotomayor stated that although the situation that Congress placed the BIA in is frustrating, (Note: Congress appropriated a limited amount of funds for the IDEAA contracts, but required the BIA to accept every contract that a tribe proposed.) but it is an issue for Congress to resolve. The Court affirmed the decision of the Tenth Circuit Court. Justices Antonin Scalia, Anthony Kennedy, Clarence Thomas, and Elena Kagan joined Justice Sotomayor's opinion.

=== Dissent ===
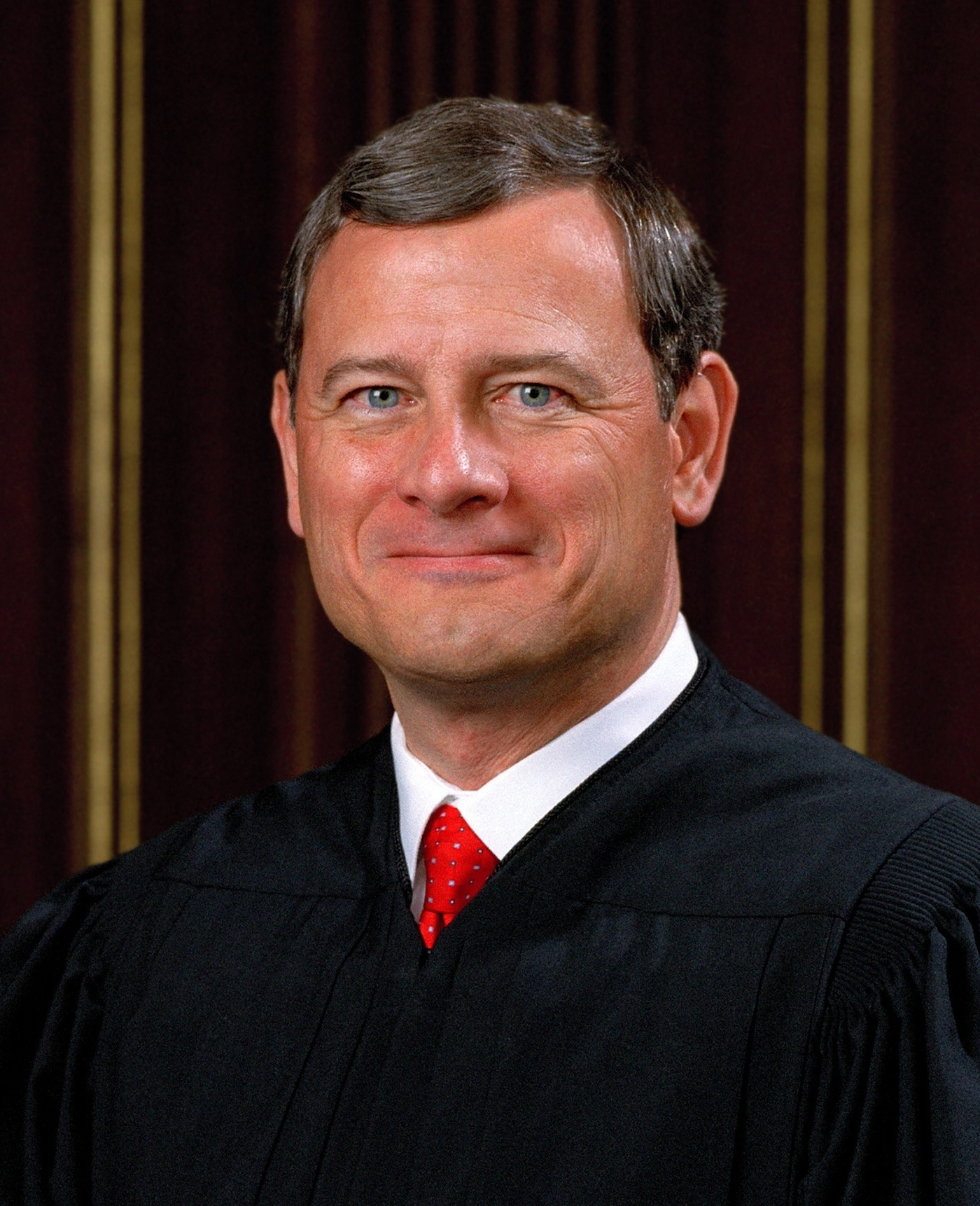
Chief Justice John Roberts, author of the dissent

Chief Justice of the United States John Roberts dissented from the majority opinion. Roberts asserted that the Court's decision would cause the BIA to exceed the monetary limits for the IDEAA contracts, which were set by Congress under its appropriation authority. In addition, Roberts noted that Congress expressly forbade the BIA from reducing payments to other tribes and programs to pay an IDEAA contract. Roberts would have distinguished Cherokee Nation from this case because Cherokee Nation did not have a similar restriction on reducing other payments. Consequently, Chief Justice Roberts wrote that he would have reversed the decision of the Tenth Circuit Court. Roberts was joined in his dissent by Justices Ruth Bader Ginsburg, Stephen Breyer, and Samuel Alito.

== Subsequent developments ==
Immediately after the decision was reached in the Supreme Court, tribes began to press the United States for payments. The Principal Chief of the Cherokee Nation, Bill John Baker, met with U.S. President Barack Obama on July 20, 2012 to discuss the issue. After several years of negotiations, the federal government agreed to pay $940,000,000 to settle the remaining claims in the lawsuit.
