= Wiley v Keokuk (1870) =

Kansas Supreme Court case

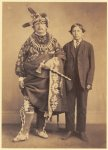
Moses Keokuk, son of the famous Sac and Fox chief Keokuk, and Moses' son, 14 year old Charles Keokuk, full-length portrait, standing, facing front

In Wiley v Keokuk (1870), the Kansas Supreme Court ruled Native Americans had the right to move freely on and off of their reservations and affirmed Native litigants' right to use habeas corpus to challenge wrongful arrest.

== Background ==
Born in February 1824, Moses Keokuk was a member of the Sac and Fox tribe in the northeast area of Kansas. After Moses's father, Keokuk, died in 1848, Moses fell into his father’s position as a chief of the Sac and Fox tribe. While Moses Keokuk led his tribe, he prioritized creating and advancing relationships and alliances with Americans and signed multiple removal treaties that moved the Sac and Fox from Kansas into Indian Territory.

== Incident ==
In October 1868, the United States Commissioner of Native American Affairs declared that Native Americans would not be allowed to visit Washington, D.C., due to minimal federal funding. Later in the fall of 1868, Moses Keokuk, left his reservation and traveled to Washington, D.C., using his own personal funds. When Moses was on his way out of Kansas, the designated Indian agent for Sac and Fox tribe, Albert Wiley, reported to the Lawrence Kansas Police Department to arrest Moses because of the declaration made by the Commissioner of Native American Affairs. Lawrence Police Department detained Keokuk in November 1868 and assaulted him.

== Legal proceedings ==
After Keokuk had been jailed, he filed a writ of habeas corpus. Keokuk was then granted the writ of habeas corpus. Keokuk initially submitted this filing to the lower district court in Kansas. James Christian, who partnered in a law firm with James Lane, was the appointed attorney for Moses Keokuk. Samuel Riggs was the attorney for Albert Wiley. Keokuk won the trial in the lower court. Keokuk also decided to sue for the damages that were inflicted upon him. Wiley challenged the ruling and appealed to the findings of the court to the Kansas Supreme Court for a new trial. This is because Wiley believed that Keokuk was not following the declaration made by of the U.S. Commissioner of Native American Affairs, and he was doing his job as an Indian Agent by reporting Keokuk's activity. Indian Agents at this time were held responsible for upholding and implementing United States Federal Indian Policy. The Kansas Supreme Court upheld the initial rulings of the lower district court. This was notable due to the courts recognizing and acknowledging the legality of Native American’s right to move freely on and off of their reservations. This was also notable because the justice system stood firmly with the concept that all individuals have the right to file for habeas corpus, regardless of their identity. The ruling of this case created a message acknowledging an extent of Native American autonomy in Kansas, even though many federal policies stood in contrast to the idea.

== Impact and legacy ==
In the fall of 1903, the Sac and Fox tribe performed an outdoor "medicine dance". Moses came to spectate this ceremony. He later came down with an intense cold that later formed into pneumonia. This sickness caused Keokuk to pass away. According to The Oglala Light, "Keokuk’s life was an inspiration to his people, and his example is one which it were well to follow. His kind deeds and his loving words of sound advice would long dwell in the memories of his fellow tribesmen."
