= Havasupai =

Indigenous ethnic group of Arizona, US

Havasupai–Hualapai: Havsuwʼ Baaja
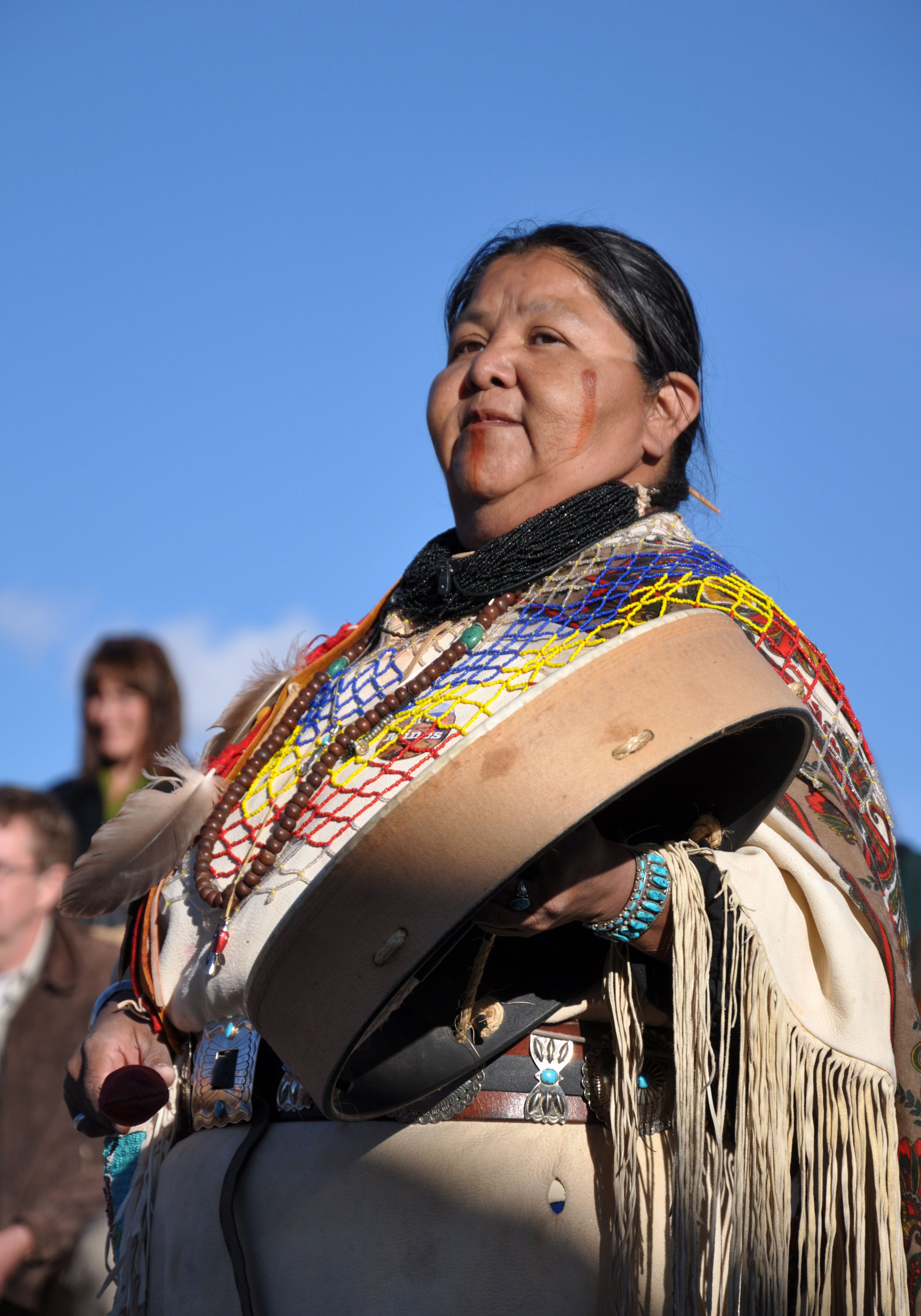
- A Havasupai woman in ceremonial attire, 2010

Total population
- About 730 (2017)

Regions with significant populations
- Supai, Arizona

Languages
- Havasupai, English

Religion
- Indigenous, Christianity

Related ethnic groups
- Yavapai, Hualapai

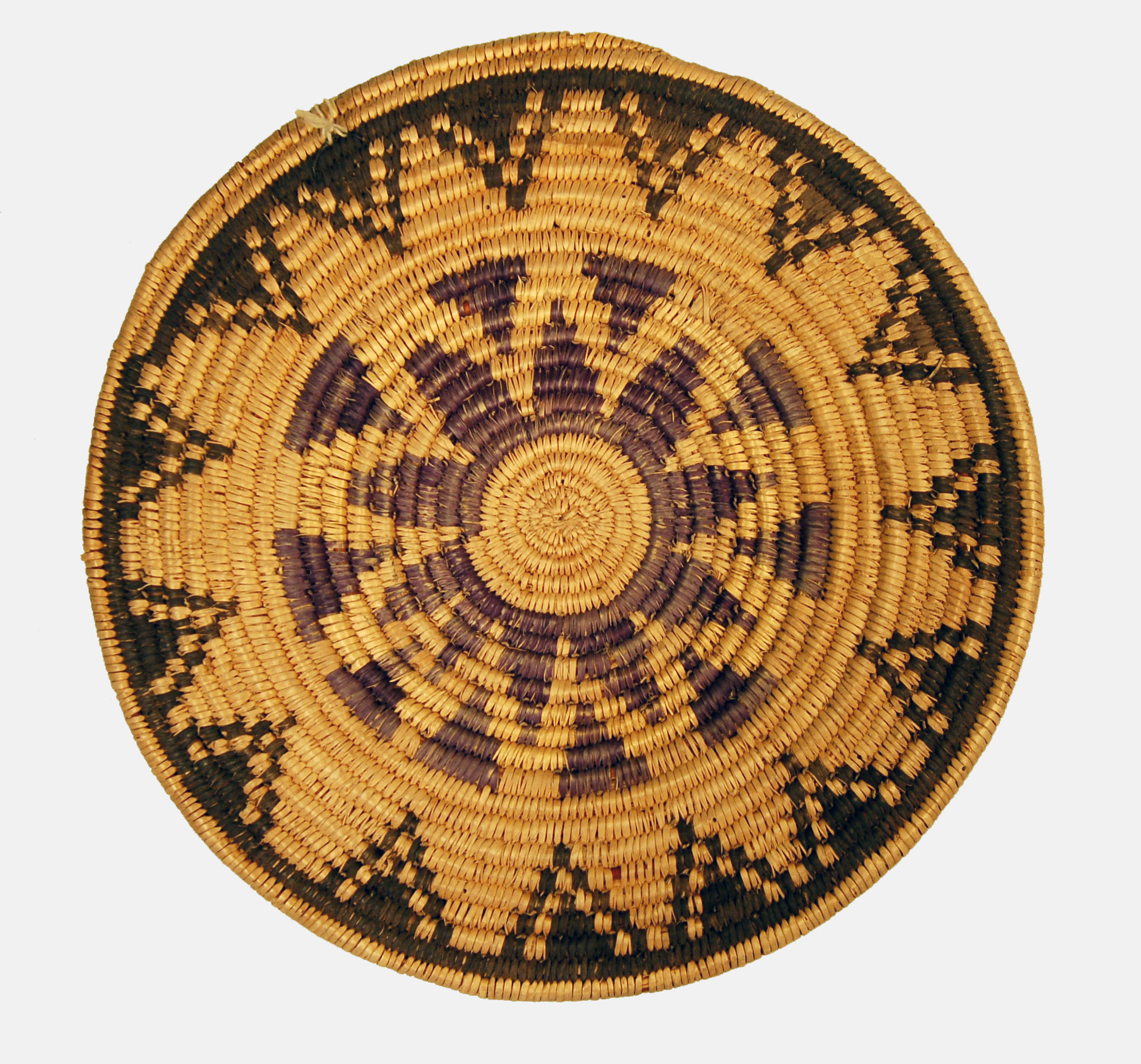
Havasupai Basket, c. 1907

The Havasupai people (Havasupai: Havsuw' Baaja) are a Native American people and tribe who have lived in the Grand Canyon for at least the past 800 years. Their name means "people of the blue-green water", referring to Havasu Creek, a tributary of the Colorado.

Located primarily in an area known as Havasu Canyon, this Yuman-speaking population once laid claim to an area the size of Delaware (2,500 mi^{2} [6,500 km^{2}]). In 1882, however, the United States federal government forced the tribe to abandon all but 518 acres (210 ha) of its land. A silver rush and the Atchison, Topeka and Santa Fe Railway in effect destroyed the fertile land. Furthermore, the inception of the Grand Canyon as a national park in 1919 pushed the Havasupai to the brink, as their land was consistently being used by the National Park Service. Throughout the 20th century, the tribe used the US judicial system to fight for the restoration of the land. In 1975, the tribe succeeded in regaining approximately 185,000 acres (75,000 ha) of their ancestral land with the passage of the Grand Canyon National Park Enlargement Act.

As a means of survival, the tribe has turned to tourism, attracting thousands of people annually to its streams and waterfalls at the Havasupai Indian Reservation.

== History ==
=== Relation with Hualapai ===
Ethnically, the Havasupai and the Hualapai are one people, although today, they are politically separate groups due to U.S. government policy. The Hualapai (Pa'a or Pai) had three subtribes: the Plateau People, the Middle Mountain People, and Yavapai Fighter. The subtribes were divided into seven bands, which themselves were broken up into thirteen regional bands or local groups. The local groups were composed of several extended family groups living in small villages: The Havasupai were just the Havasooa Pa'a regional band (or local group) of the Nyav-kapai ("Eastern People") of the Plateau People subtribe.

=== Pre-1882 ===
Havasupai woman.

Havasupai man.

The tribe had traditionally relied heavily on agriculture, hunting, and gathering as their means of survival. Although living primarily above and inside the Grand Canyon, which consists mostly of harsh terrain, the tribe's reservation was also home to some lush vegetation and the aquamarine blue water of Havasu Creek. Their name, meaning "the People of the Blue-Green Waters," reflects this.

The Havasupai are said to have existed within and around the Grand Canyon for over eight centuries. Little is known about the tribe before their first recorded European encounter in 1776 with Spanish priest Francisco Garcés. Garcés reported seeing roughly 320 individuals in his time with the Havasupai, a number that would diminish over the centuries as westward expansion and natural catastrophes significantly decreased the population size.

In the first half of the 19th century, with the exception of the introduction of horses by the Spanish, U.S. westward expansion affected the Havasupai less than it did other indigenous populations of the West. Even as interaction with settlers slowly increased, day-to-day life did not change much for the tribe until silver was discovered in 1870 by Cataract Creek. The migration of prospectors to the area was unwelcome. The Havasupai sought protection from the intrusion of Western pioneers on their land and sought out assistance, but to little avail. An executive order by President Rutherford Hayes in 1880 established a small federally protected reservation for the tribe, yet it did not include the mining areas along the Creek (Hirst, 1985).

During this era, Havasupai relations with other Native American tribes were generally mixed. Bonds and interactions with the Hopi tribe, whose reservation was in close proximity, were strong, as the two peoples did a great deal of trading with each other. The Hopi introduced crops, such as the gourd and sunflower, that would eventually become a staple of the Havasupai diet. Still, the Havasupai were not without enemies as they were consistently at odds with the Yavapai and the Southern Paiute, who would steal and destroy crops planted by the Havasupai.

=== 1882–1920 ===
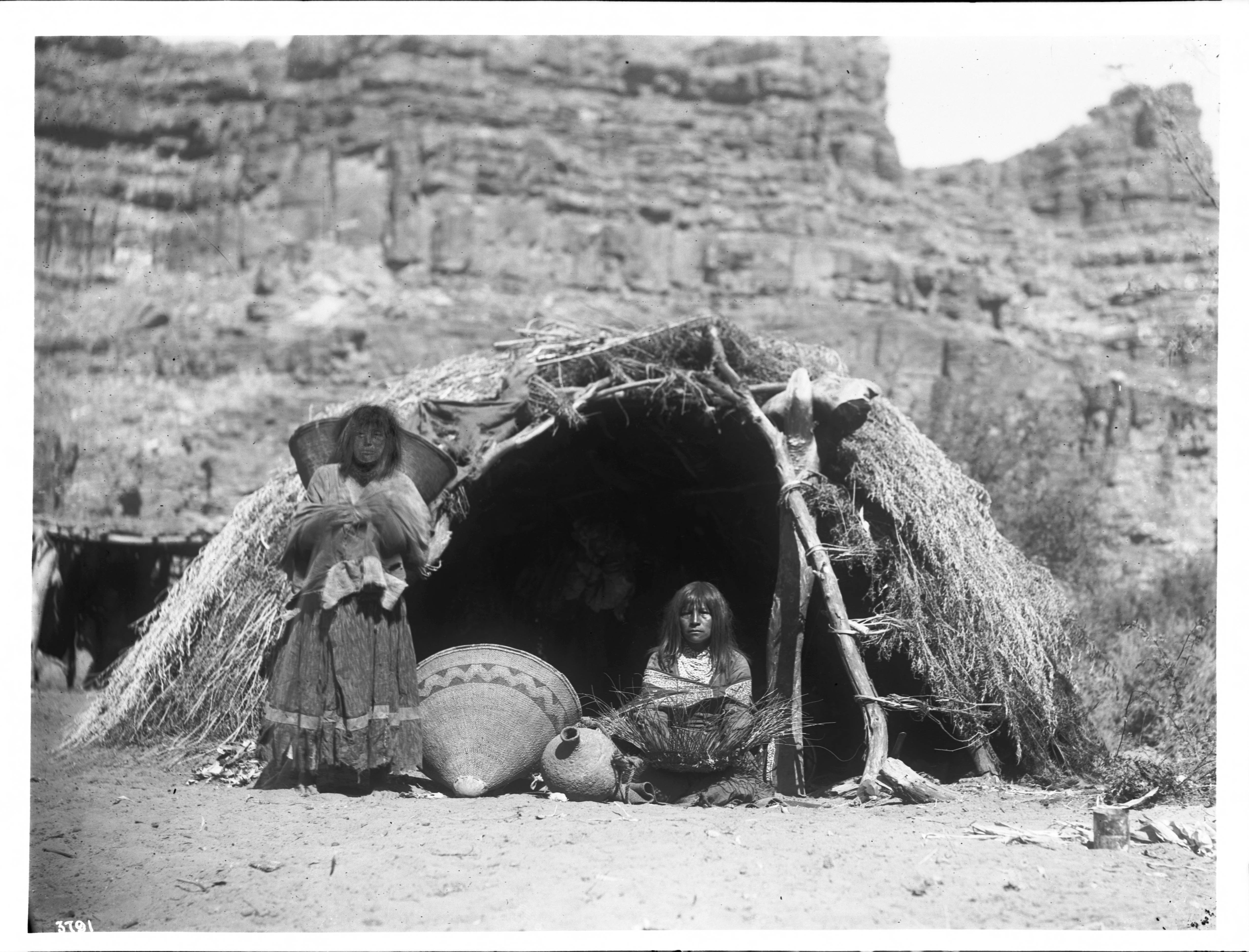
Two Havasupai women in front of a native dwelling, Havasu Canyon, ca.1899

In 1882 President Chester A. Arthur issued an executive order that all land on the plateau of the canyon, which was traditionally used for winter homes for the tribe, was to become public property of the United States. The order in effect relegated the Havasupai to a 518-acre (2.10 km^{2}) plot of land in Cataract Canyon, taking almost all of their aboriginal land for American public use. According to reports, the Havasupai were completely unaware of the act for several years.

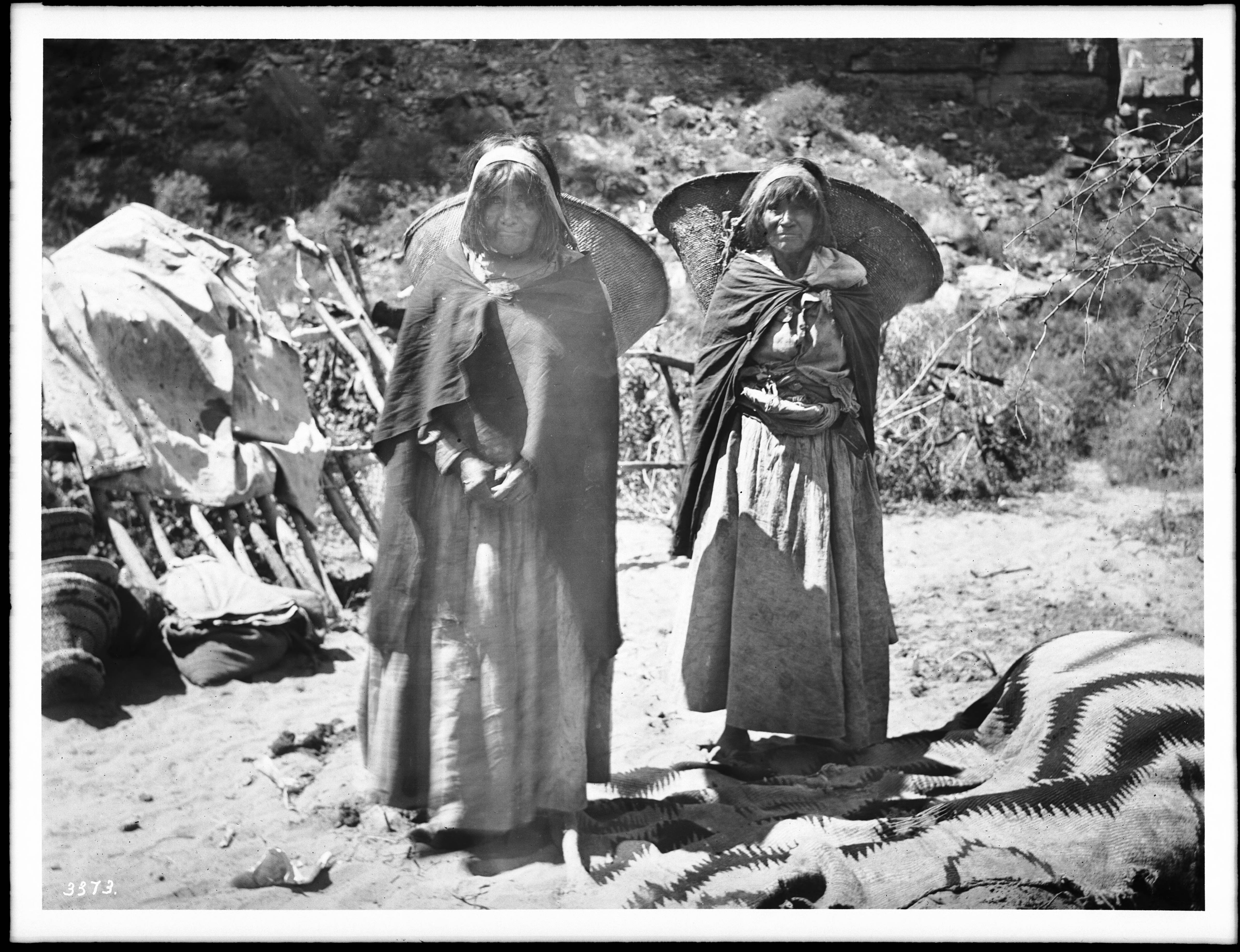
Two Havasupai women with "Kathaks" on their backs, ca.1900

The loss of almost all of their land was not the only issue that the Havasupai were contending with: the increase in the number of settlers in the local region had depleted game used for hunting, and soil erosion (a result of poor irrigation techniques) touched off a series of food shortages. Furthermore, interaction with the settlers sparked deadly disease outbreaks amongst tribe members, who were ravaged by smallpox, influenza, and measles. By 1906 only 166 tribal members remained – half the number Garcés saw when he first encountered the tribe in 1776. At one point, there were only 40 women and 40 men of childbearing age, which caused a genetic population bottleneck.

In the 1800s, the continental railway system was greatly expanded. In 1897, construction opened on a spur line of the Santa Fe Railroad, which was to lead directly to the Grand Canyon; by 1901, the line was open. During his visit to the Grand Canyon in 1903, President Theodore Roosevelt met two Havasupais at Ha’a Gyoh (Havasupai Garden, formerly called Indian Garden). Roosevelt told them about the park that was being created and that they would have to leave the area. In 1908, the Grand Canyon was declared a national monument, and by 1919 it had received National Park status. However, it was not until 1928 that the Havasupai finally left Ha’a Gyoh, forced out by the National Park Service.

=== 1921–1975 ===
Issues regarding health within the Havasupai population reduced its growth to the point where almost an entire generation was lost due to infant and child mortality. Low morale spread throughout the tribe, leading to an increase in gambling, alcoholism, and violence. As the years progressed, the Havasupai came to realize that they could not hope to survive in their American social situation without embracing at least some aspects of it. Breaking horses, working on farms, or even serving as employees of the Grand Canyon National Park were all options for tribal members. The Havasupai fought to keep their methods and traditions alive, but the federal government and the National Park Service generally held a dismissive attitude toward these efforts and accelerated the pace of actions such as razing residents' traditional homes and replacing them with cabins. As similar instances transpired throughout the years, the methods of the Park became clear: they wanted the final 518 acres (2.10 km^{2}).

In this period, the tribe continually fought with the government to have the land that had been taken returned to them. In 1968, the tribe won its Indian Claims Commission case against the United States. The court findings stated that the Havasupai had portions of their land taken from them illegally in 1882 and that the tribe was entitled to recover the land from the US at fair market value (ICC 210). That value ended up being 55 cents an acre, totaling just over one million dollars. Although the case was a landmark for the Havasupai in the sense that it was proven in a court of law that the federal government had inappropriately taken their land, it had still not been properly returned to the tribe.

However, the momentum that the Havasupai gained from the ICC case followed them into the 1970s as the tribe continued to fight to have their traditional territory returned to them. In 1974, garnering support from the Nixon administration as well as influential newspapers such as the Los Angeles Times, the Wall Street Journal, and the San Francisco Chronicle, the tribe made their push to have the congressional bill S. 1296, which would actually return their land, passed through Congress. Months of deliberation and stalling on the part of some congressmen almost led to the bill's demise. But days before Congress went on fall break, the bill was finally passed by both Houses and made its way to the President's desk. Similarly, the bill sat on President Gerald Ford's desk until the final possible moments before it was signed and passed into law on January 4, 1975. S. 1296 granted the Havasupai a trust title to approximately 185,000 acres (750 km^{2}); another 95,300 acres (386 km^{2}) were designated as "Havasupai Use Lands," to be overseen by the National Park Service but available for traditional use by the Havasupai.

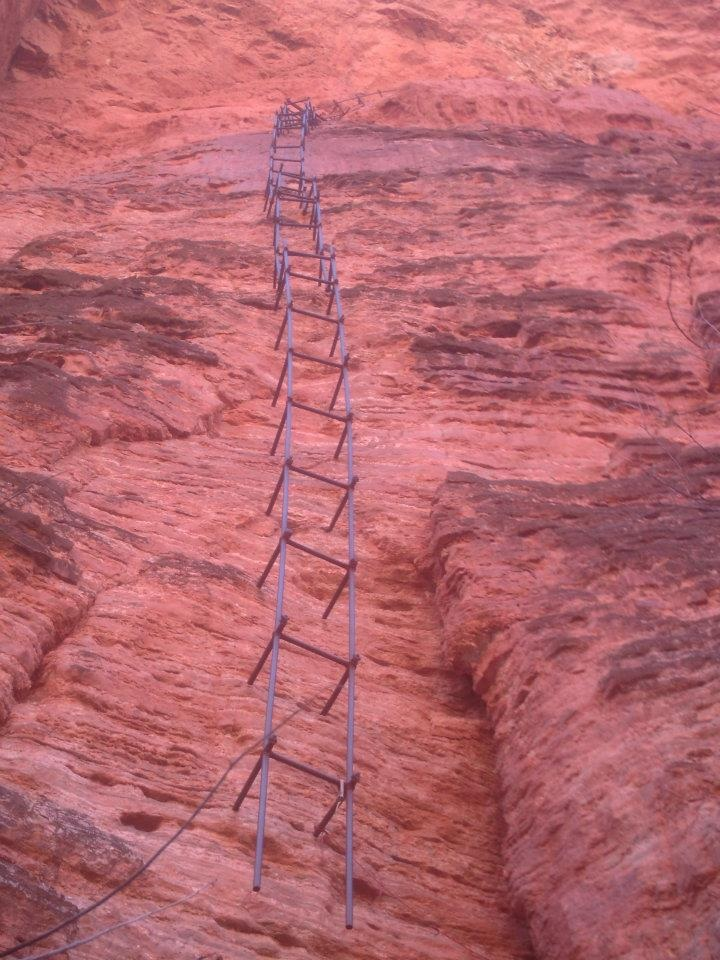
Pipe ladder

Mining interests also had a presence in the canyon in this period. Tunnels are a familiar sight in the campground area with the deepest of them around 300 feet (100 m). The largest of the mines is in Carbonate Canyon, adjacent to Havasu Falls, where rails and timbers still can be found descending three levels. Lead was mined here for the last time during WWII. Ranger Gale Burak, who worked at the Grand Canyon for several years, spoke of her experiences as a cook for the Havasu Lead and Zinc Company hard rock mining camp, where the campground now resides. Below Mooney Falls, the famous pipe "ladder" ascended to a vanadium deposit.

=== 1976–present ===
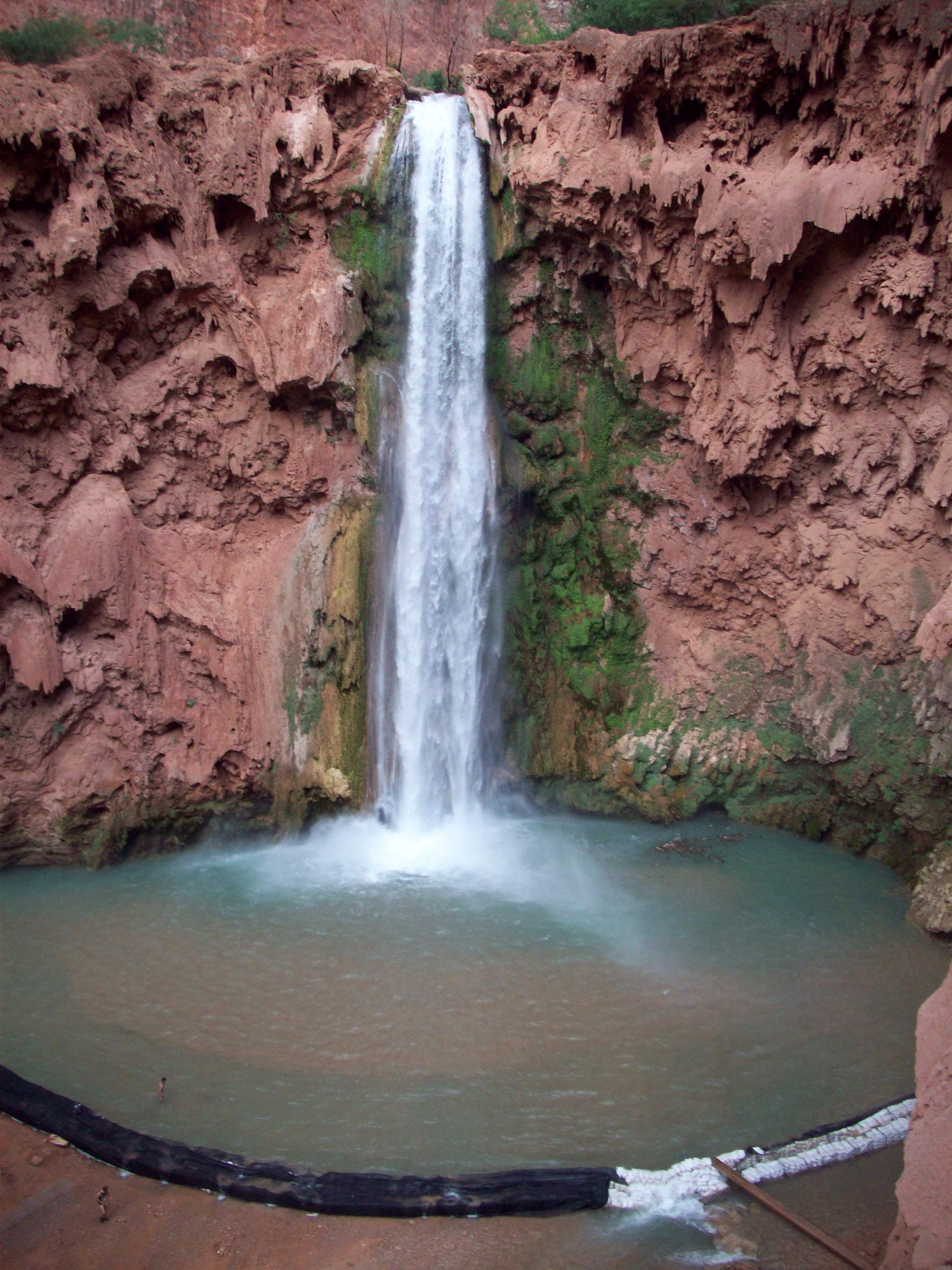
Mooney Falls

Following the return of a large share of their land, the Havasupai as a tribe have once again begun to flourish. Although many of the day-to-day customs that existed before 1882 are not well established today, the Havasupai have continued to respect and preserve the traditions of their ancestors. As of 2019, the tribe consists of about 730 members, of which about 400 live on the reservation.

Presently, the tribe has begun to take advantage of the beauty of its land by turning it into a tourist destination for visitors to the Grand Canyon. Tribal members often work as packers and/or workers for tourist ventures or work at the lodge, tourist offices, the café, etc.

=== 2003–2010 blood sample controversy ===
In 2003, protests ensued when it was found that Arizona State University had used blood samples consensually acquired from the Havasupai people to "study the causes of behavioral/medical disorders," with an initial goal of determining whether the high rates of Type 2 diabetes among Havasupai adults were due to the same gene that causes high rates of diabetes in the Pima people. Multiple genetic research studies were done without the consent or permission of the Havasupai. This included one that indicated that their ancestors migrated from Asia to North America, which contradicts the traditional Havasupai belief that the tribe originated in the canyon. Another showed a relatively high level of consanguinity, which can result in health problems. Although this is the normal and expected result of the population bottleneck in the early 20th century, the publication of the results made people feel stigmatized.

ASU incurred legal fees of US$1,700,000 and eventually agreed to pay the 41 Havasupai participants US$700,000. Attorney Stephen Hanlon working pro bono with the law firm Holland & Knight was also able to facilitate the ceremonial return of the blood samples. It has since been claimed that scientific study of Native Northern American genomes has been hampered due to scientists' fears of getting caught up in a similar legal predicament.

== Traditional culture ==
Location of the reservation within Arizona

=== Agriculture ===
Before modern times, agriculture was the essential means of progress and survival for the Havasupai. In the winter, the tribe members stationed themselves on the plateau of the canyon; in the summer, irrigation gardening of the crop fields brought the members back inside the canyon walls. As vast and uneven as the Grand Canyon is, it is somewhat of an anomaly that the Havasupai were able to agriculturally sustain and thrive in such a voluminous landscape. Because of a lack of available soil rich in nutrients, it has been suggested that the tribe cultivated only 200 acres (81 ha) of land on the canyon floor. Although lacking space, the tribe's irrigation technology was far more advanced than others in the Southwest, allowing them to be agriculturally intensive. However, being located at the bottom of a canyon left the fields vulnerable to flooding due to rain and the overflowing of Cataract Creek, as was the case in 1911 when almost an entire crop field was destroyed. In 1920, to combat the issue, the federal government assisted the tribe in constructing a new irrigation system which was generally effective in ceasing soil erosion from water overflows.

Historically, the main crops for the Havasupai were corn, beans, squash, sunflowers, gourds, and some cotton. Corn, the tribe's main crop, was generally harvested in the later summer months. While growing, a farming technique called cepukaka was used to protect the corn from being blown over when it reached a certain height. In this technique, a farmer loosened the soil around the corn and then pulled it into a hill around the stalk base. Along with their traditional crops, the Havasupai were introduced to melons, watermelons, and orchard trees with the arrival of the Spanish. By the 1940s, these crops had become staples of the Havasupai diet.

==== Irrigation methods ====
The irrigation techniques of the Havasupai were largely based on their development and constant maintenance of a gravity-fed irrigation system at the base of the Havasu Canyon. This system used hand-dug earthen trenches that divert water from the Havasu Creek to their fields. These systems were built to conform with the existing contours which allow for efficient irrigation without modern pumps. The community diligently cooperated and helped clear and maintain the canals whenever necessary. They also adapted the orientation of them as the seasons and rainfall changed or if there was large sediment build up.

The system of open channel canals included manually operated diversions to send the water where it was needed most. Families of the tribe regulated flow by operating small headgates to ensure water was shared equitably while also preventing erosion and over-saturation. This system also carried nutrient-dense sediment onto the crop fields which replenished the soil year after year and increased crop yields. This method fully supported and allowed for crops to grow on the canyon floor, a very narrow and flood-prone area. It also helped the tribe survive through the drastic season differences.

Although the tribe was later aided by the federal government and more rigorous infrastructure was installed, the traditional irrigation methods continued to have a role in water management amongst the Havasupai. Oral and contemporary accounts confirm that the effectiveness of the system came from the deep ecological knowledge passed down from generation to generation. The implementation of this knowledge allowed for sustainable agriculture in one of the most arid environments in all of North America.

=== Hunting ===
The bow and arrow were of primary importance to a Havasupai hunter. Built from an unidentifiable tree, an entire process of crafting, bending, and designing went into the construction of these hunting tools. With westward expansion, however, came the introduction of the rifle; as years went by, the gun became the primary hunting device for men. The word for "arrow" began to stand in for "bullet" as well (Whiting, 1985).

Throughout the years, sheep and deer were the dominant game for the Havasupai, but small game, including rabbits and squirrels, were also used as food. Historically, the Havasupai hunted in large groups, and the game distribution amongst the hunters was generally fair. In the twentieth century, however, due to overhunting and neighboring development, the populations of large game animals such as sheep became sparse. As a result, the Havasupai were forced to alter their hunting habits to adjust to the expansionists, making tribesmen less likely to share with others.

=== Gathering ===
The gathering of wild plants and seeds was typically done by Havasupai women. Two primary methods were used: 1) knocking seeds from plants directly, and 2) the heads of plants were gathered before the seeds were ready to fall. It was desirable for the women to locate lighter foods that could easily be moved to the plateau in winter. Additionally, dry foods that could be stored for extended periods of time to prevent spoilage were preferable. Walnuts, wild candytuft, and barrel cacti were only a few of the many plants and seeds gathered by the women throughout the spring and summer months.

== Modern culture ==
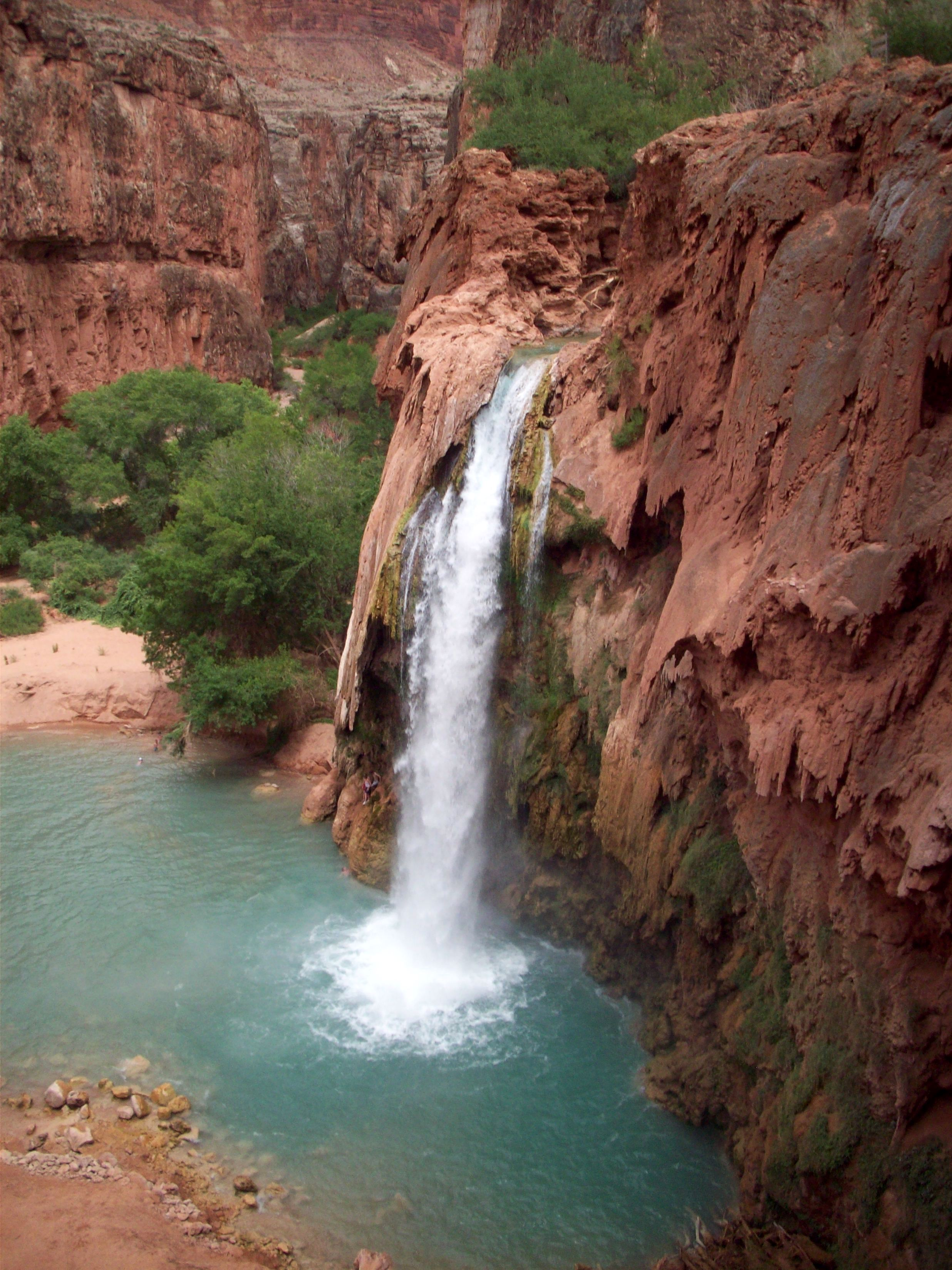
Havasu Falls

=== Government ===
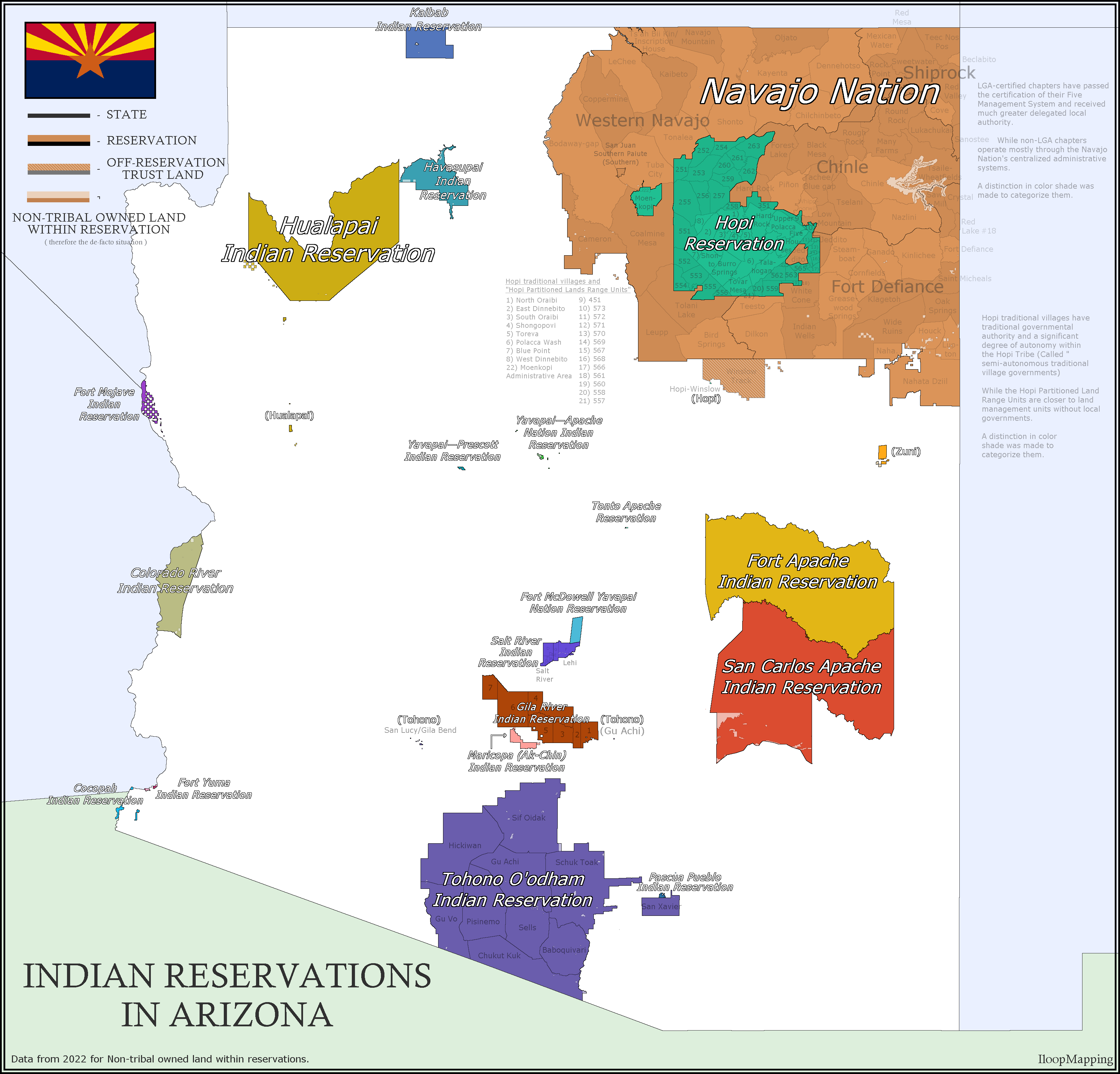
Map of the Havasupai Tribe and neighboring tribes.

A seven-member tribal council, which handles most policy matters, is elected once every two years. It is led by a chairman who is elected from among the members of the council. The Bureau of Indian Affairs (BIA) is the entity charged with law enforcement and protection for the Tribe, while the Indian Health Service clinic provides health care and emergency services.

=== Language ===
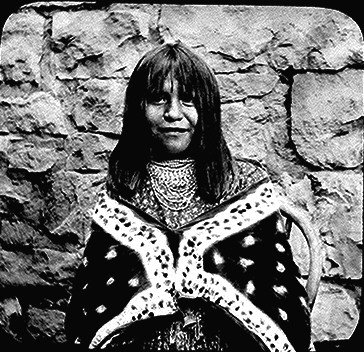
A young Havasupai girl, circa 1900

Havasupai is a dialect of the Upland Yuman language spoken by about 450 people on the Havasupai Indian Reservation in and around the Grand Canyon. It is the only Native American language in the United States spoken by 100% of its indigenous population. The Havasupai variety is nearly identical to the variety of the Hualapai, although the two groups are socially and politically distinct (Kendall 1983:5) and employ different orthographies. The speakers of Havasupai and Hualapai consider their languages separate. It is a little more distantly related to the Yavapai language. Grammatical descriptions, vocabularies, and texts documenting Havasupai have been published (Mithun 1999:578).

=== Supai ===
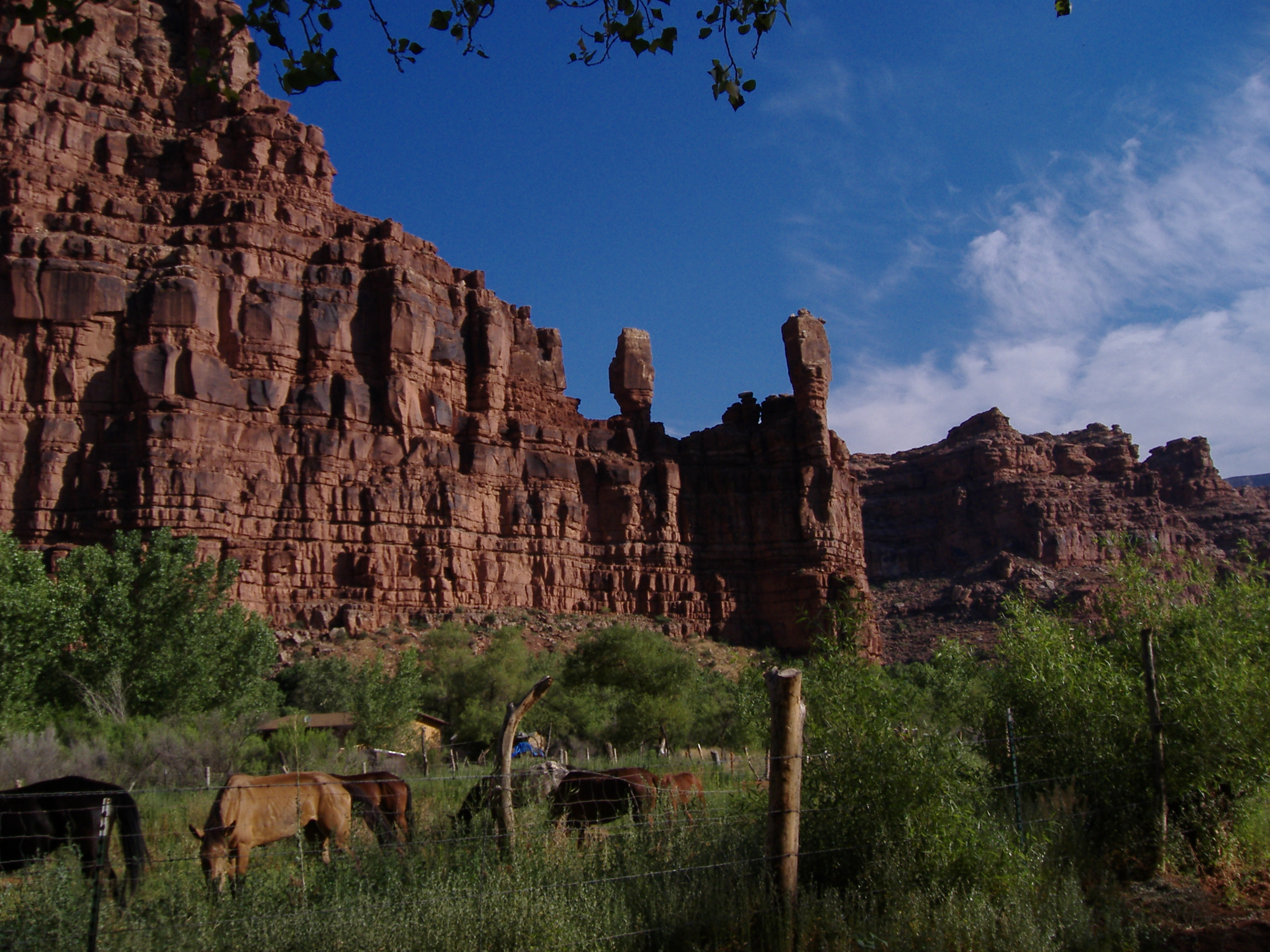
The "Watchers" overlook Supai

Supai (Havasupai: Havasuuw) is the Havasupai city at 36°14′13″N 112°41′21″W at the bottom of the Grand Canyon. The town is the capital of the Havasupai Indian Reservation, at 36°09′40″N 112°36′48″W in Coconino County. It is home to around 400 of the tribe members and is one of the most remote cities in the contiguous United States, as it can only be accessed by taking old U.S. Route 66 and traveling about 60 miles (100 km) along BIA Road 18 to the trailhead. The city can be reached from the trailhead via an 8-mile (13 km) hike. An alternative to the hike is a helicopter ride or a horse ride. The town has 136 houses, a café, a general store, a tourist office, a lodge, a post office, a school, among other buildings.

Animal Welfare Concerns

Horses, mules and donkeys have historically been used on the Havasupai Indian Reservation in Arizona to transport visitors' luggage, supplies and other goods along the approximately eight-mile trail between Hualapai Hilltop and Supai Village. Due to the community's remote location and limited road access, pack animals have played an important role in transportation. However, their treatment and physical condition have been the subject of animal welfare concerns for several decades.

The animal welfare advocacy organization Stop Animal ViolencE (SAVE) https://havasupaihorses.org/, established in 2016, has collected eyewitness accounts and visitor reports alleging neglect and mistreatment of horses, mules and donkeys used in transportation and tourism.. Reported concerns include malnutrition, dehydration, injuries, overloading and inadequate veterinary care. In 2016, Havasupai tribal member Leland Joe pleaded guilty to two counts of animal abuse following an investigation involving neglected horses. In May 2017, a team of volunteer veterinarians organized by the Humane Society of the United States visited Supai and examined approximately 70 horses, providing treatment and education on animal care. In April 2018, the Tribe reported three animal cruelty convictions in its tribal court and two additional charges, alongside efforts to introduce packer permits and animal inspections.

Additional allegations received public attention in 2019, when animal welfare advocates released footage they said showed injured and malnourished horses and mules working along the canyon trail. A Havasupai Tribe spokesperson stated that the Tribe took reports of animal abuse seriously and investigated allegations. In June 2023, People for the Ethical Treatment of Animals (PETA) published further reports of alleged mistreatment, including accounts of animals with open wounds, visible signs of malnutrition and injuries associated with carrying heavy loads. PETA also shared eyewitness footage documenting conditions it considered evidence of animal suffering.

On May 30, 2024, journalist Dana Gentry published an investigation titled "After Years of Reports and Complaints, Havasupai Pack Animals Still in Peril, Say Activists" in the Reno Gazette Journal. The article included visitor accounts describing underweight and injured animals, as well as comments from SAVE founder Susan Ash and a Havasupai Tribe spokesperson. The spokesperson stated that the Tribe maintained its own animal welfare code and enforcement policies. In September 2024, further allegations involving a group of underweight horses prompted the Tribe's Animal Control office and the Bureau of Indian Affairs to review the reports. Tribal representatives stated that the horses had been brought to safety following flooding in the area.

SAVE reports that it continues to receive eyewitness accounts of suspected animal mistreatment on the reservation, sometimes on a weekly basis. According to the organization, these reports concern not only commercial pack animals but also other horses, mules and dogs. SAVE shares photographs, videos and visitor testimonies through its website and Facebook page.

Reports and allegations of animal neglect and mistreatment have been documented over several decades, with renewed public attention and additional eyewitness accounts reported between 2016 and 2024. The allegations primarily concern particular animal owners and handlers and should not be attributed to the Havasupai Tribe or its members collectively. Tribal representatives have publicly acknowledged animal welfare concerns and described efforts to address them through tribal regulations, investigations and veterinary initiatives.

=== Tourism ===
Tourism is the main source of revenue for the Havasupai tribe. The town receives 30,000 to 40,000 visitors per year. The Tribe charges for entering its land, and visitors are required to reserve either a room at their lodge or a space at the campground.

== Havasupai Trail ==
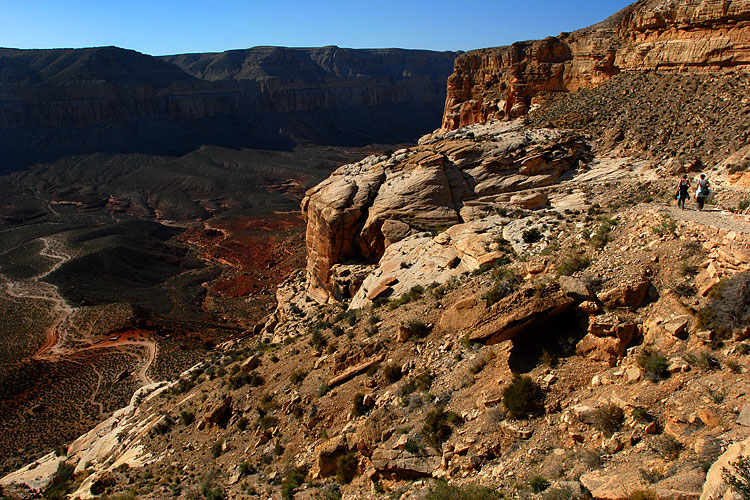
Havasupai Trail

The trailhead is at Hualapai Hilltop, Arizona (located at the end of BIA Road 18), where there is a large parking lot, a helipad, and portable toilets. The trail can be traveled by foot or horseback. Alternatively, transportation by helicopter is periodically available. Mule service can also be purchased for luggage/packs only. The trail to Supai is approximately eight miles (thirteen kilometers) long and descends approximately 2,000 feet (600 meters). The campground is an additional two miles (three point two kilometers), with another drop of about 350 feet (110 m).

== Havasu Creek ==
Havasu Creek runs through Supai. The creek has several waterfalls, including Havasu Falls.

== Gallery ==
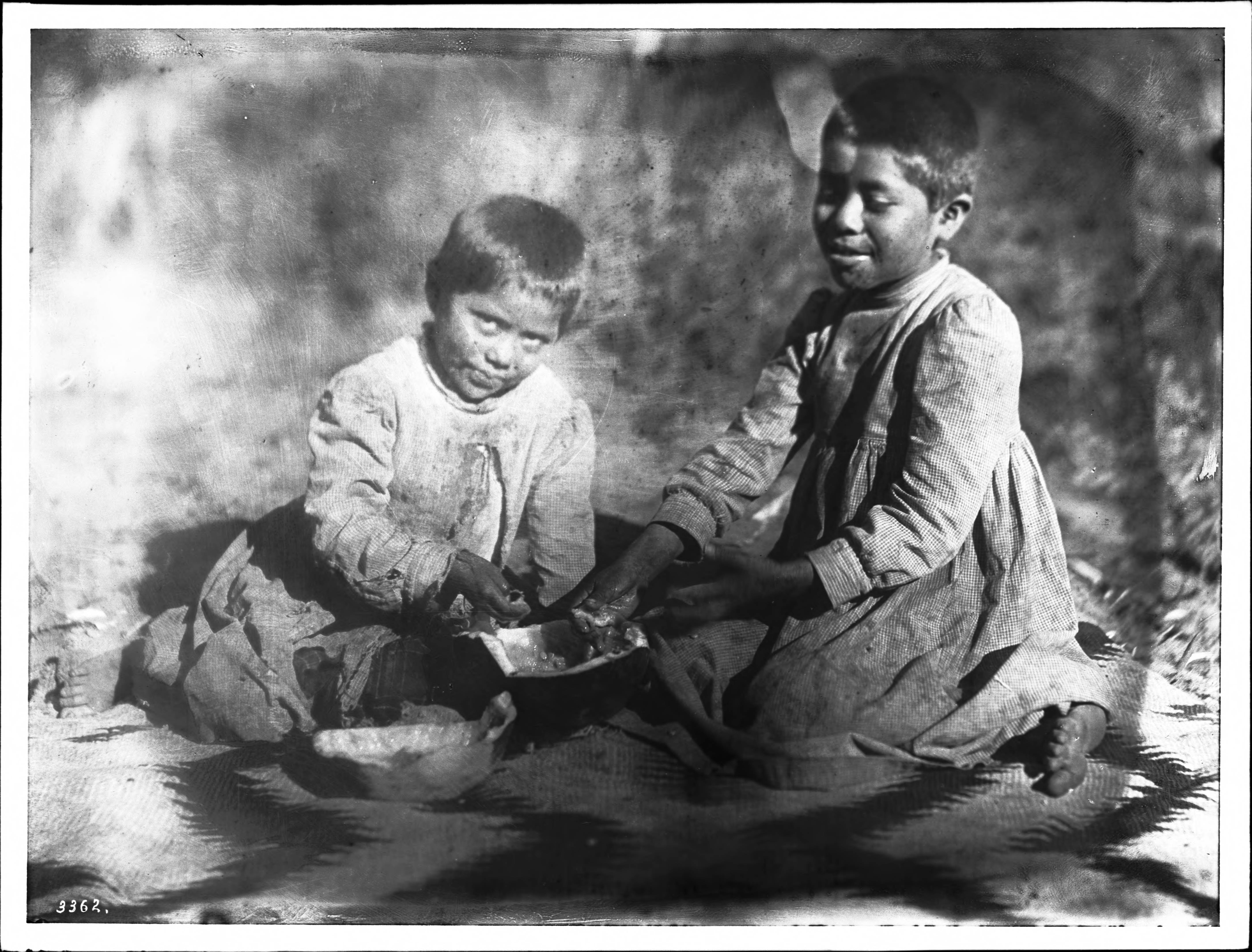
Two Havasupai children, the daughters of Chickapanagie's, enjoying a melon, ca. 1900. Both are wearing checkered dresses and are barefooted. They sit on a blanket with a zig-zag pattern with their hands in a half melon between them. Their hair is cut very short.

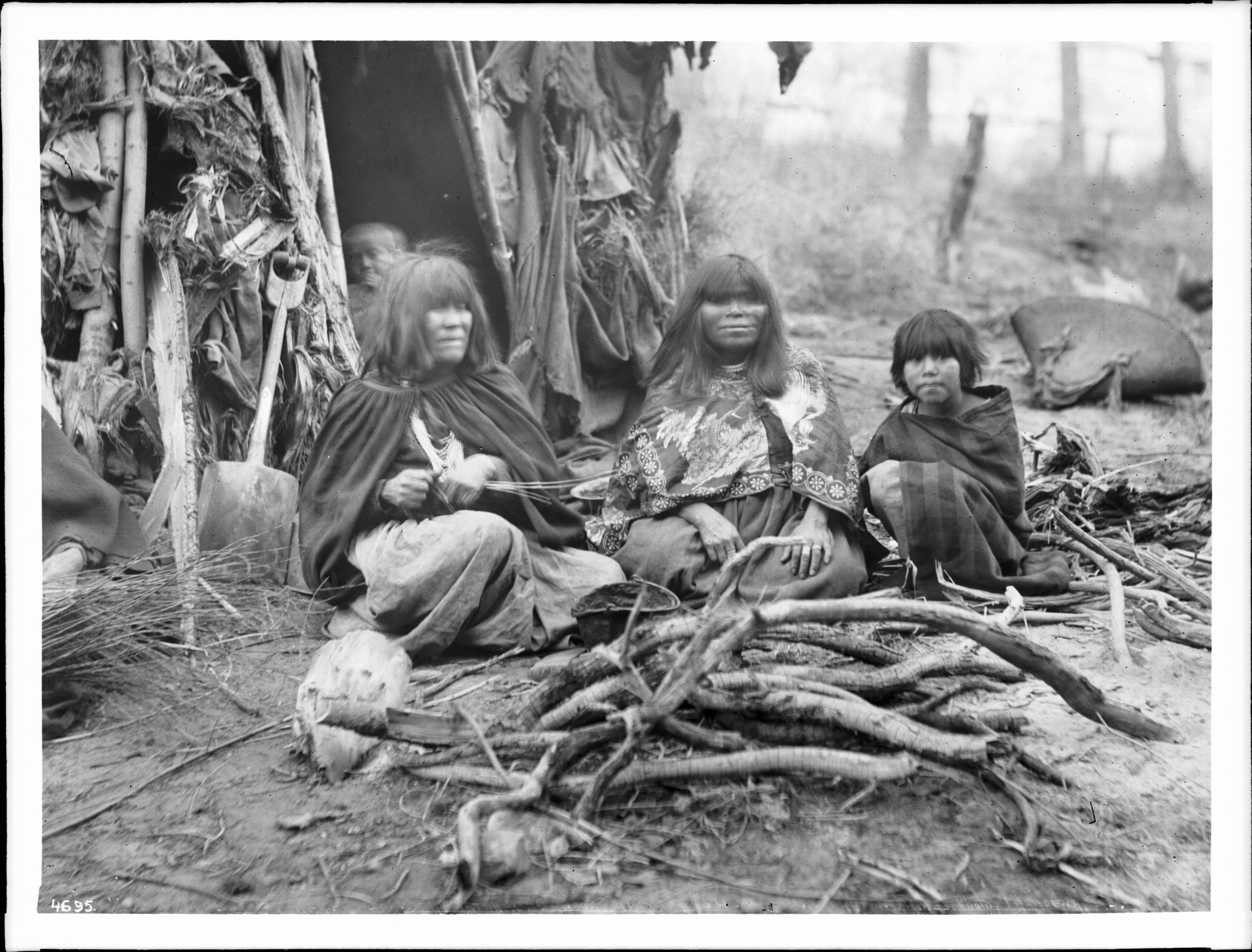
Two Havasupai women basket makers, ca. 1900. The women and a child sit on the ground in front of a house made of branches. They wear long dresses with shawls over their shoulders. They sit among firewood. A child peers out of the entry of the dwelling. A "kathak", a large conical basket, lies on the ground at right.

== See also ==
- Grand Canyon
- Grand Canyon National Park
- Havasu Creek
- In the House of Stone and Light, a 1994 song by Martin Page
