= National Council on Indian Opportunity =

The National Council on Indian Opportunity was an American Indian rights group established by Executive Order 11399 on March 6, 1968, and amended by an act of United States Congress on November 26, 1969. The Council's creation was announced in a speech to Congress by Lyndon B. Johnson. The group's mission was to encourage and oversee the rise of federal programs to benefit the American Indian population, measure the impact and progress of such programs, and suggest ways to improve programs to meet the demands of the American Indian population. The Council was terminated on November 26, 1974, under the provisions of section 2 of the act.
