= The Forgotten American =

US presidential speech

The Special Message to the Congress on the Problems of the American Indian, also known as The Forgotten American' speech, was addressed to the United States Congress on March 6, 1968, by President Lyndon B. Johnson.

In the speech, Johnson outlined economic and social issues facing Native Americans and called for an end to the termination policy. He stated his belief in "a policy of maximum choice for the American Indian" grounded in "programs of self-help, self-development, self-determination". He also announced Executive Order 11399, creating a National Council on Indian Opportunity led by the vice president alongside indigenous and business community leaders.

== Background ==
The policy of 'termination' from the mid-1940s to mid-1960s, officially announced under House Concurrent Resolution 108 (1953), impacted many tribes. Designed to bring about the cultural assimilation of indigenous Americans, termination ended federal recognition of tribal sovereignty and cancelled federal aid and services. Relocation programs like those under the Indian Relocation Act of 1956 encouraged Native American urban migration away from reservations, often resulting in unemployment, poverty and discrimination.

While not directly targeting Native Americans, Johnson had committed to expanding the federal government's role in domestic social and economic reform through his Great Society programs. He called for Congress to act on issues such as education, disease, healthcare, urban renewal, poverty and civil rights. Under Johnson, Congress passed laws including the Economic Opportunity Act (1964), Civil Rights Act (1964), Voting Rights Act (1965) and the Immigration and Nationality Act (1965).

In 1966, Johnson appointed Robert Bennett, a member of the Oneida nation of Wisconsin, as Commissioner of Indian Affairs. The same year, Johnson formed a Presidential Task Force on the American Indian which highlighted issues with the termination policy. Later, during the 1967 State of the Union Address, Johnson spoke of the need to provide "self-help assistance to the forgotten in our midst--the American Indians and the migratory farm workers".

== Speech ==
The speech came 25 days before Johnson announced his withdrawal from the 1968 presidential election:

Mississippi and Utah--the Potomac and the Chattahoochee--Appalachia and Shenandoah ... The words of the Indian have become our words--the names of our states and streams and landmarks. ... The American Indian, once proud and free, is torn now between white and tribal values; between the politics and language of the white man and his own historic culture. His problems, sharpened by years of defeat and exploitation, neglect and inadequate effort, will take many years to overcome ... I propose a new goal for our Indian programs: A goal that ends the old debate about "termination" of Indian programs and stresses self-determination; a goal that erases old attitudes of paternalism and promotes partnership self-help...The program I propose seeks to promote Indian development by improving health and education, encouraging long-term economic growth, and strengthening community institutions. Underlying this program is the assumption that the Federal government can best be a responsible partner in Indian progress by treating the Indian himself as a full citizen, responsible for the pace and direction of his development.

— Lyndon B. Johnson, Special Message to the Congress on the Problems of the American Indian,

Johnson's message, according to Brad Simpson, was "framed in the context of extending great society programs of self-help and economic opportunity" to Native Americans. The message was referred to the Senate Committee on Interior and Insular Affairs.

The speech has been labelled as the first presidential address to Congress focusing on the problems facing Native Americans.

== Criticism ==
While recognizing problems faced by indigenous people in the United States, the speech did not attribute social and economic injustices to particular actions by federal and state government. Rebecca L. Robbins, writing in the Wíčazo Ša Review, critiqued its use of paternalistic, stereotyping and culturally assuming language. Robbins also states that despite its "moralistic commitment to American Indians", the speech "does not mandate any concrete action for the improvement of Indian opportunity".

== Legacy ==
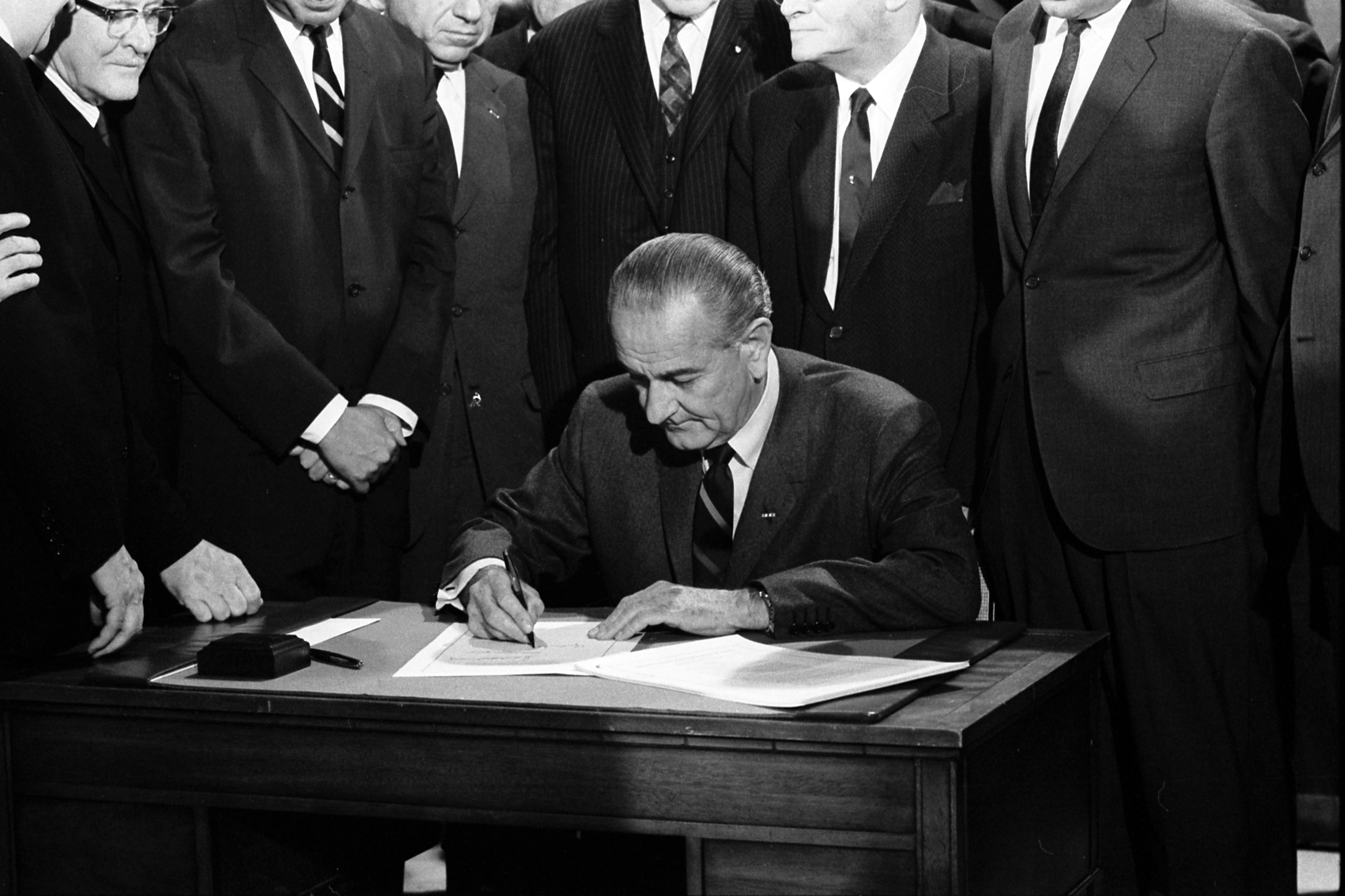
President Lyndon B. Johnson signing the Civil Rights Act of 1968

In the speech, Johnson urged Congress to pass the Indian Rights Bill. This was achieved when Titles II through VII of the Civil Rights Act (enacted April 11 1968) made many of the guarantees in the US Bill of Rights applicable to Native American tribes. The provisions of this Act, however, have also been criticized for allowing federal courts to involve themselves in intra-tribal matters.

On July 8, 1970, President Richard Nixon issued to Congress a special message on Indian affairs where he similarly emphasized the need for "self-determination without termination". While Nixon rejected many of the Great Society programs, he continued to support the policy of self-determination.

The National Council on Indian Opportunity existed until November 1974.

The name of the non-profit Organization of the Forgotten American (OFA), founded in 1969, was inspired by this speech.
