= Tennant v. Jefferson County Commission =

- Supreme Court of the United States

Decided September 25, 2012
- Full case name: Tennant v. Jefferson County Commission
- Citations: 567 U.S. 758 (more)

Holding
- Although West Virginia could have adopted a plan with lower variations in population among the districts, the state carried its burden to show that population deviations were necessary to achieve legitimate state objectives, such as avoiding contests between incumbents and not splitting political subdivisions.

Court membership
- Chief Justice John Roberts Associate Justices Antonin Scalia · Anthony Kennedy; Clarence Thomas · Ruth Bader Ginsburg; Stephen Breyer · Samuel Alito; Sonia Sotomayor · Elena Kagan

Case opinion
- Per curiam

Tennant v. Jefferson County Commission, 567 U.S. 758 (2012), was a United States Supreme Court case holding that although West Virginia could have adopted a plan with lower variations in population among the districts, the state carried its burden to show that population deviations were necessary to achieve legitimate state objectives, such as avoiding contests between incumbents and not splitting political subdivisions.

== Background ==
Plaintiffs in this case claimed that West Virginia's 2011 congressional redistricting plan violated the "one person, one vote" principle that the Supreme Court had previously held to be embodied in Article I, Section 2, of the Constitution. A three-judge district court for the Southern District of West Virginia agreed, declaring the plan "null and void" and enjoining West Virginia’s Secretary of State from implementing it. The state defendants appealed directly to the Supreme Court.

== Opinion ==
In a per curiam decision, the Supreme Court announced that the district court misapplied the standard for evaluating "one person, one vote" challenges set out in Karcher v. Daggett and failed to afford appropriate deference to West Virginia's reasonable exercise of its political judgment. They reversed the lower court.
