= Williams v. Illinois (2012) =

- Supreme Court of the United States

Argued December 6, 2011 Decided June 18, 2012
- Full case name: Sandy Williams v. State of Illinois
- Citations: 567 U.S. 50 (more)

Holding
- Petitioner's rights under the Confrontation Clause were not violated when an expert witness is called as a stand-in for a lab analyst who performed a DNA test.

Court membership
- Chief Justice John Roberts Associate Justices Antonin Scalia · Anthony Kennedy; Clarence Thomas · Ruth Bader Ginsburg; Stephen Breyer · Samuel Alito; Sonia Sotomayor · Elena Kagan

Case opinions
- Plurality: Alito, joined by Roberts, Kennedy, Breyer
- Concurrence: Breyer
- Concurrence: Thomas (in judgment)
- Dissent: Kagan, joined by Scalia, Ginsburg, Sotomayor

Laws applied
- Confrontation Clause

Williams v. Illinois, 567 U.S. 50 (2012) was a United States Supreme Court case where it was ruled that having an expert witness testify on behalf of a third-party lab analyst does not violate the Sixth Amendment's Confrontation Clause as long as the results were not directed to prove guilt.
