= List of United States Supreme Court cases, volume 567 =

This is a list of all the United States Supreme Court cases from volume 567 of the United States Reports:

Case name	Citation	Date decided
Elgin v. Dept. of Treasury	567 U.S. 1	2012
The CSRA gives exclusive jurisdiction to suits rising under the act to the MSPB, with appeals to the U.S. Court of Appeals for the Federal Circuit, and further appeals to the Supreme Court. Federal District Courts cannot rule on issues regarding the act or on adverse employment actions of the federal departments. The MSPB can hear constitutional arguments for adverse employment actions.
Parker v. Matthews	567 U.S. 37	2012
The Antiterrorism and Effective Death Penalty Act of 1996 (AEDPA) prohibits "using federal habeas corpus review as a vehicle to second-guess the reasonable decisions of state courts."
Williams v. Illinois	567 U.S. 50	2012
Petitioner's rights under the Confrontation Clause were not violated when an expert witness is called as a stand-in for a lab analyst who performed a DNA test.
Christopher v. SmithKline Beecham Corp.	567 U.S. 142	2012
The petitioners—pharmaceutical sales representatives whose primary duty is to obtain nonbinding commitments from physicians to prescribe their employer’s prescription drugs in appropriate cases—qualify as outside salesmen under the most reasonable interpretation of the Department of Labor’s regulations.
Salazar v. Ramah Navajo Chapter	567 U.S. 182	2012
The United States government, when it enters into a contract with a Native American Indian tribe for services, must pay contracts in full so long as funds are available, regardless of whether sufficient funds are available to pay all such contracts.
Pottawatomi Indians v. Patchak	567 U.S. 209	2012
the United States waived sovereign immunity from the Native American nation's action under the Quiet Title Act. Also, the nation had prudential standing to challenge the acquisition of land by the Department of the Interior.
FCC v. Fox Television Stations, Inc.	567 U.S. 239	2012
Failure to give broadcasters fair notice, prior to the broadcasts in question, that fleeting expletives and momentary nudity could be found actionably indecent rendered the Federal Communications Commission's standards unconstitutionally vague as applied to those broadcasts. Second Circuit vacated and remanded.
Dorsey v. United States	567 U.S. 260	2012
As established by the Fair Sentencing Act of 2010, the lower mandatory minimum sentences for crack cocaine crimes apply to defenders who committed their offenses before the enactment of the law while also being sentenced for their offenses after the effective date of the law.
Knox v. Serv. Employees	567 U.S. 298	2012
The case is not moot, the First Amendment does not permit a public-sector union to impose a special assessment without the affirmative consent of a member upon whom it is imposed.
S. Union Co. v. United States	567 U.S. 343	2012
Apprendi v. New Jersey applies to criminal fines.
Arizona v. United States	567 U.S. 387	2012
An Arizona law providing authority for local law enforcement to enforce immigration law violated the enumerated powers of Congress and is preempted by federal statute. Arizona law enforcement may inquire about a resident's legal status during lawful encounters, but may not implement its own immigration rules.
Miller v. Alabama	567 U.S. 460	2012
The Eighth Amendment prohibits a sentencing scheme that requires life in prison without the possibility of parole for juvenile homicide offenders.
Am. Tradition Partnership, Inc. v. Bullock	567 U.S. 516	2012
Summary reversal. Citizens United v. FEC remains good law.
Nat'l Federation of Independent Business v. Sebelius	567 U.S. 519	2012
(1) The Tax Anti-Injunction Act does not apply because the Patient Protection and Affordable Care Act (ACA)'s labeling of the individual mandate as a "penalty" instead of a "tax" precludes it from being treated as a tax under the Anti-Injunction Act. (2) The individual mandate constitutionally functions as a tax, so it is valid exercise of Congress's taxing power. (3) Congress exceeded its Spending Clause authority by coercing states into expanding Medicaid by threatening to revoke all federal Medicaid funding. (Note: Note: Some scholars question whether this part constitutes a holding. See Nat'l Federation of Independent Business v. Sebelius#Opinions on Medicaid expansion)
United States v. Alvarez	567 U.S. 709	2012
The Stolen Valor Act of 2005 (18 U.S.C. 704) is unconstitutional because it violates the Free Speech Clause of the First Amendment to the Constitution of the United States of America.
First Am. Fin. Corp. v. Edwards	567 U.S. 756	2012
Dismissed as improvidently granted.
Tennant v. Jefferson Cnty. Comm'n	567 U.S. 758	2012
Although West Virginia could have adopted a plan with lower variations in population among the districts, the state carried its burden to show that population deviations were necessary to achieve legitimate state objectives, such as avoiding contests between incumbents and not splitting political subdivisions.
