= Cherokee Nation of Oklahoma v. Leavitt =

- Supreme Court of the United States

Argued November 9, 2004 Decided March 1, 2005
- Full case name: Cherokee Nation of Oklahoma and Shoshone-Paiute Tribes of the Duck Valley Reservation, et al. v. Michael O. Leavitt, Secretary of Health and Human Services, et al.
- Citations: 543 U.S. 631 (more) 125 S. Ct. 1172; 161 L. Ed. 2d 66

Case history
- Prior: Cherokee Nation v. United States, 190 F. Supp. 2d 1248 (E.D. Okla. 2001); affirmed, Cherokee Nation v. Thompson, 311 F.3d 1054 (10th Cir. 2002); cert. granted, 541 U.S. 934 (2004); Thompson v. Cherokee Nation, 344 F.3d 1075 (Fed. Cir. 2003); cert. granted, 541 U.S. 934 (2004).

Holding
- The federal government's contract to reimburse a tribe for health care costs is binding even when Congress fails to appropriate funds for the cost.

Court membership
- Chief Justice William Rehnquist Associate Justices John P. Stevens · Sandra Day O'Connor; Antonin Scalia · Anthony Kennedy; David Souter · Clarence Thomas; Ruth Bader Ginsburg · Stephen Breyer

Case opinions
- Majority: Breyer, joined by Stevens, O'Connor, Kennedy, Souter, Thomas, Ginsburg
- Concurrence: Scalia
- Rehnquist took no part in the consideration or decision of the case.

Laws applied
- Indian Self-Determination and Education Assistance Act, 25 U.S.C. 450 et. seq.

Cherokee Nation of Oklahoma v. Leavitt, 543 U.S. 631 (2005), was a United States Supreme Court case in which the Court held that a contract with the Federal Government to reimburse the tribe for health care costs was binding, despite the failure of Congress to appropriate funds for those costs.

== Background ==
In 1975, Congress enacted the Indian Self-Determination and Education Assistance Act (ISDEAA) which authorized several Federal agencies to enter into contracts with federally recognized Indian tribes. Pursuant to the ISDEAA, both the Cherokee Nation of Oklahoma and the Shoshone and Paiute tribes of the Duck Valley Indian Reservation (in Idaho and Nevada) entered into contracts with the U.S. Department of Health and Human Services (HHS) to provide health care for tribal members. Under the ISDEAA and the contracts, HHS was to pay the tribes' costs for providing that care. In contracts for fiscal years 1994 through 1997, HHS agreed to pay contract support costs to the tribes, but later refused to do so on the grounds that Congress had not appropriated sufficient funds.

=== Original proceedings ===
In one of the cases, the Cherokee tribe first sought relief in administrative proceedings before the Interior Board of Contract Appeals (Board). The Board found for the tribe, ordering the government to pay the Cherokees $8.5 million in damages.

In the second case, the tribes then brought suit in the Federal District Court for the Eastern District of Oklahoma, seeking approximately $6.9 million for breach of contract. The District Court found against the tribe, stating that HHS could not pay (through the Department of the Interior, which managed the funds) if Congress had not appropriated enough money.

=== Appellate proceedings ===
Both cases were appealed – the first by the government to the Federal Circuit Court of Appeals and the second by the tribes to Tenth Circuit Court of Appeals. Both appellate courts affirmed the decision of the lower courts, which had the result of opposite rulings on almost identical facts. The Supreme Court granted certiorari to resolve the conflict.

== Opinion of the Court ==
Justice Stephen Breyer delivered the opinion of the court, in which six of the other justices joined. Breyer affirmed the Federal Circuit's decision in favor of the Cherokee tribe and reversed the Tenth Circuit decision that was in favor of the government. The government argued that if these were "ordinary procurement contracts, its promises to pay would be legally binding" but that these were "unique, government-to-government" contracts. The government felt that the tribes should only get the pro-ratia portion of the funds that had been appropriated.

Breyer noted that Congress was concerned "with [the] Government's past failure adequately to reimburse tribes' indirect administrative costs and a congressional decision to require payment of those costs in the future." Breyer was unpersuaded by the arguments of the government and found in favor of the tribes.

=== Concurring opinion ===
Justice Antonin Scalia concurred in the opinion with the exception of the majority's reliance on a Senate committee report to determine the intent of Congress.

== Subsequent developments ==
This case has played a major role in promoting tribal self-determination, while holding the Federal government accountable for paying contracts that it made with the various tribes. It is one of the few bright spots for Indian litigation in a period where most of the Supreme Court decisions are going against the tribes.
