= Indian Self-Determination and Education Assistance Act of 1975 =

1975 U.S. law allowing federal grants to be made directly to recognized native tribes

- Long title: An Act to provide maximum Indian participation in the government and education of the Indian people; to provide for the full participation of Indian tribes in programs and services conducted by the Federal Government for Indians and to encourage the development of human resources of the Indian people; to establish a program of assistance to upgrade Indian education; to support the right of Indian citizens to control their own educational activities; and for other purposes.
- Nicknames: Indian Educational Reform Act

Citations
- Public law: 93-638
- Statutes at Large: 88 Stat. 2203

Codification
- Titles amended: 25 U.S.C.: Indians
- U.S.C. sections created: 25 U.S.C. ch. 14, subch. II § 5301 et seq.

Legislative history
- Introduced in the Senate as S. 1017 by Henry M. Jackson (D-WA) on February 26, 1973; Committee consideration by Senate Interior and Insular Affairs, House Interior and Insular Affairs; Passed the Senate on April 1, 1974 (Passed); Passed the House on December 19, 1974 (Passed) with amendment; Senate agreed to House amendment on December 19, 1974 (Agreed); Signed into law by President Gerald Ford on January 4, 1975

United States Supreme Court cases
- Cherokee Nation v. Leavitt, 543 U.S. 631 (2005); Salazar v. Ramah Navajo Chapter, 567 U.S. 182 (2012); Menominee Tribe of Wis. v. United States, 577 U.S. 250 (2016); Becerra v. San Carlos Apache Tribe, No. 23-250, 602 U.S. ___ (2024)

The Indian Self-Determination and Education Assistance Act of 1975 (Public Law 93-638) authorized the secretary of the interior, the secretary of health, education, and welfare, and some other government agencies to enter into contracts with, and make grants directly to, federally recognized Indian tribes. The tribes would have authority for how they administered the funds, which gave them greater control over their welfare. The ISDEAA is codified at Title 25, United States Code, beginning at section 5301 (formerly section 450).

Signed into law on January 4, 1975, the ISDEAA made self-determination the focus of government action. The Act reversed a 30-year effort by the federal government under its preceding termination policy to sever treaty relationships with and obligations to Indian tribes. The Act was the result of 15 years of change, influenced by American Indian activism, the civil rights movement, and community development based on grassroots political participation.

== History ==
The Indian Reorganization Act (IRA) of 1934 was an early step in the renewal of tribal self-governance, in the forms of creation of constitutions and employment of counsel. The IRA was somewhat limited, as all tribal actions were subject to review by the Secretary of the Interior (via the Bureau of Indian Affairs [BIA]).

In the 1950s, some members of Congress passed legislation to renew the effort to have Native Americans assimilate, and to terminate the special relationship between the federal government and tribal nations. The government sought to terminate the legal standing of numerous tribes, judging their members ready to be independent U.S. citizens. More than 100 tribes and communities were terminated under the Indian termination policy.

The failure of termination policies became obvious with assessment by the late 1960s. Native Americans and the federal government began to work for a return to greater Indian rights represented by the earlier IRA. The passage of the Indian Civil Rights Act of 1968 (ICRA) was influential. ICRA guaranteed the application of much of the Bill of Rights in Indian Country, a guarantee which Native Americans on – reservations had not enjoyed.

The rise of activist groups in the 1960s, such as the American Indian Movement (AIM) and alike, and high-profile demonstrations such as the occupation of Alcatraz led by Native American activist Richard Oakes, helped bring the issue of Native American rights to greater prominence in public policy. President Richard Nixon's "Message from the President of the United States Transmitting Recommendations for Indian Policy" (8 July 1970) recommended self-determination for Indian tribes as a goal of the federal government. His message said that termination was an incorrect policy. Nixon called for broad-sweeping self-determination legislation. This goal was met in the Indian Self-Determination and Education Assistance Act or PL 93-638.

== Implementation ==
Implementation of PL 93-638 created a process known as self-determination contracting, under which "the employees and administrative control of an otherwise federal program are transferred to the tribal government via a "638 contract"." Under these contracts, tribes agree to set up a particular program (in areas such as resource management, law enforcement, education, childcare, and environmental protection) while meeting federal requirements and guidelines in order to receive funding and support. The duties entailed in contracts between the federal government and the tribes were assigned to implementing agencies, one of which was the Bureau of Indian Affairs, BIA.

The BIA at first resisted this change. The process was strictly for approval of funds for tribal use to conduct their own affairs, for instance, to educate their children. Continued efforts by tribal leaders to obtain the grant money and pressure from Congressional representatives helped bring about a new way of doing business. The influence of the BIA over tribal affairs slowly lessened. In addition, the United States Supreme Court in Cherokee Nation of Oklahoma v. Leavitt found that the Federal government was liable for payments under a 638 contract.

=== Shortcomings ===
Although the 638 contracts provide necessary funding and assistance programs to many tribes, PL 93-638 had significant limitations. For example, tribes did not have the ability to reallocate government funds across different 638-contracted programs to meet shifting needs in their communities. According to section 106c of the law "all contracts between the appropriate Secretary and Indian tribes shall be limited to a term of one (1) to three (3) years," sometimes making it difficult to achieve longer term goals. The 1975 law also allowed either Secretary to annul a 638 contract or reassume control of a program "if he or she finds that the tribal contractor's performance involves the violations of rights...gross negligence or mismanagement in the handling of contract funds."

=== Amendments ===
Amendments have been made by legislators to the Indian Self-Determination and Education Assistance Act.
