= Federal Indian Policy =

US government policy

Federal Indian policy establishes the relationship between the United States Government and the Indian Tribes within its borders. The Constitution gives the federal government primary responsibility for dealing with tribes. Some scholars divide the federal policy toward Indians in six phases: coexistence (1789–1828), removal and reservations (1829–1886), assimilation (1887–1932), reorganization (1932–1945), termination (1946–1960), and self-determination (1961–1985).

== The Trade and Industrial era ==
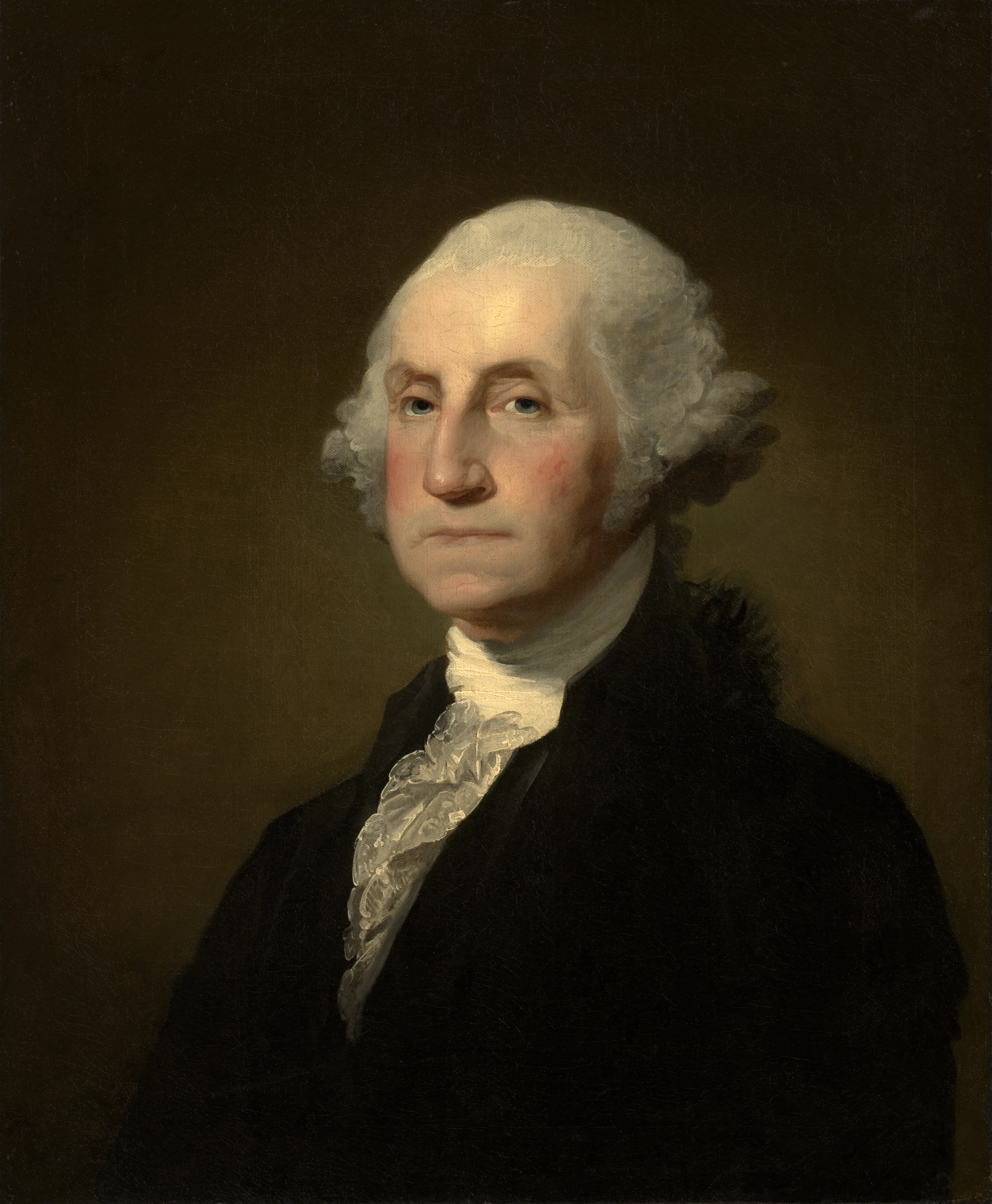
The original Nonintercourse Act was signed by President George Washington.

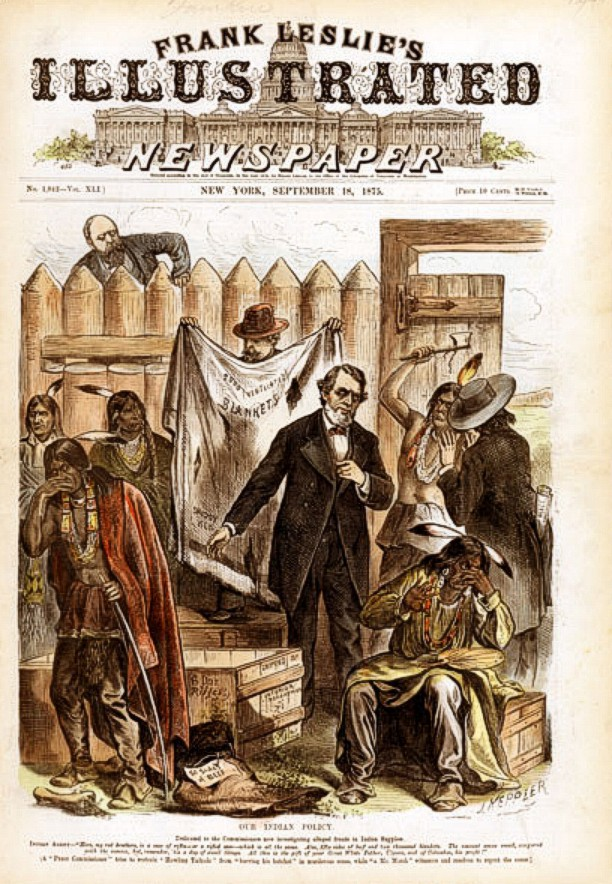
The U.S. Indian policy was riddled with fraud. Here a peace commissioner offers torn ("ventilated") blankets, an empty rifle case, and 50 sides of spoiled beef, Frank Leslie's Illustrated Newspaper of 18 September 1873.

The Nonintercourse Act of 1790 marked the beginning of the Trade and Industrial era. This act established that no sales of Indian lands were to be made between any persons or states unless the sale was authorized by the United States. The United States federal government was then granted management of trade and diplomatic relations that involved Indians and their lands. The main goal of establishing the Trade and Industrial Act was to keep peace on the frontier and avoid war with the Natives. During the Trade and Industrial Era, the Natives were also included within the United States government, to some degree, by the establishment of the Bureau of Indian Affairs (BIA) within the War Department in 1824. However, land disputes and law jurisdiction cases began to appear frequently in the United States Supreme Court. It was concluded that "discovery also gave the discoverer the exclusive right to extinguish Indian title either by 'purchase or by conquest'." Natives were recognized only as occupants of the land, and not owners.

== Treaties ==
Indiana Indian treaties

The federal government was in charge of relations with the Indians, and the procedure was to use the treaty making power of the president and the Senate to make formal arrangements. Over 200 treaties were agreed upon by 1840. Gatlin argues that treaties established a procedure that benefited both parties. The federal government was primarily interested in guaranteeing that Indian lands did not fall into private hands, and that it handled all negotiations with the tribes. These negotiations, says Gatlin, strengthened the tribes sense of unity and leadership. The land sales gave the Indians a steady flow of income, and guarantees of federal financial, medical, and educational aid.

Many of the treaties remain in effect and are of special importance regarding federal recognition of tribal status, hunting and fishing rights, rights to protection of sacred properties, rights to water and minerals, and land claims. The federal courts have a long, continuous history of litigation on these issues. The Supreme Court endorsed the procedure, with over 300 decisions making reference to Indian treaties after 1799.

== Westward expansion and Indian relocation ==
During the early 19th century, as the eastern settlers of the United States felt the desire to explore westward, the natives were caught in the middle of things. Eastern Indian tribes were forced out of their homelands to barren areas that contained fruitless soils, though they had a prosperous relationship beforehand. Though a problem occurred where westward expansion was on the rise and areas in the west were becoming full with settlers and the lands that Natives resided on (Nebraska and Kansas territories) ended up being taken from them by the government and given to settlers.

== Allotment and assimilation era (1887–1943) ==
In 1887, the United States Congress passed the General Allotment Act, which is considered one of the earliest attempts aimed toward assimilation of Native tribes. This act intended to give Natives a sense of land ownership as well as integrate an agricultural lifestyle with the tribes, much like that of the Americans and Europeans. Under the General Allotment Act, tribal lands were no longer under the control of tribal governments; instead, the land was under the control of individual land owners.

This period of allotment over tribal lands became known as the "allotment and assimilation era", mainly because the main goal of allotting tribal land was to Americanize Native peoples into mainstream society.

The Allotment era resulted in the loss of over two thirds of tribally entrusted lands from 138 million acres (558,000 km^{2}) in 1871 to 48 million acres (190,000 km^{2}) in 1934.

== Termination and relocation (1945–1960) ==
Between the end of the Franklin D. Roosevelt era and the beginning of the John F. Kennedy administration, less traditional Native Americans, congressional leaders, and government administrators, developed a policy that they hoped would integrate the Indian population with mainstream America. To this end, they enacted laws to terminate the government's trusteeship of Indian lands and relocate Indians to the nation's cities. They believed that once Indians left the reservation, they would have opportunities for education, employment and assimilation. As part of the policy, the Bureau of Indian Affairs (BIA) established services in target cities, such as the Chicago Field Office, to recruit Native Americans living on reservations to move to those cities and to assist them in finding employment.

== Tribal self-determination era ==
In the early 1960s, President John F. Kennedy wanted the Indian tribes to be recognized as independent nations governing themselves. He promised the Indian tribes that treaties made prior to 1960 would be recognized by the federal government and that their rights as Indian people would be protected.

This was realized when the Alaska Native Claims Settlement Act (ANCSA) was passed in 1971. The ANCSA allowed for the Alaskan Natives to be given 40 million acres (160,000 km^{2}) of land, federal payments of 462.5 million dollars over eleven years, and another 500 million dollars to help with mineral development in Alaska. All this was in exchange for the Alaskans giving up their claim to the land. The act also allowed the Alaskan tribe to have freedom from the Bureau of Indian Affairs.

In the 1960s, there were many acts passed, geared to helping the Indian tribes. Indian tribes benefited greatly from these because it gave them rights within both the tribal and federal government. In 1968, the Indian Civil Rights Act of 1968 was passed. It recognized the Indian tribes as sovereign nations with the federal government.

In the 1970s, one of the most significant pieces of legislation passed through Congress. The Indian Self-Determination and Education Assistance Act of 1975 allowed tribes to have more tribal control over federally subsidized programs for Indians. Another important act passed by Congress was the Indian Child Welfare Act, passed in 1978, which granted tribal government jurisdiction over child custody and adoption on the reservation.

== See also ==
- Cultural assimilation of Native Americans
