= 2004 term United States Supreme Court opinions of Clarence Thomas =

The 2004 term of the Supreme Court of the United States began October 4, 2004, and concluded October 3, 2005. This was the fourteenth term of Associate Justice Clarence Thomas's tenure on the Court.
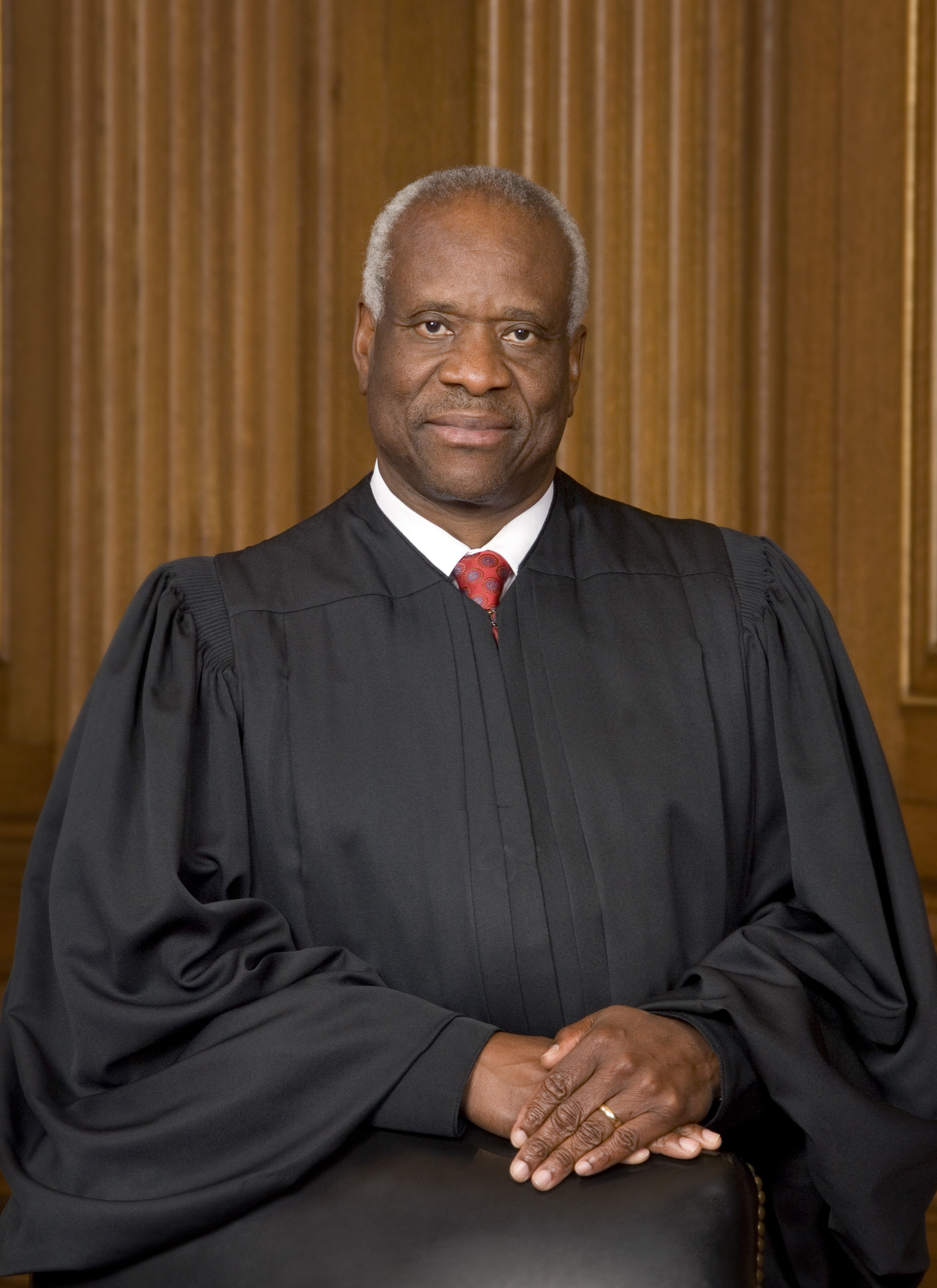

Clarence Thomas 2004 term statistics

8	Majority or plurality	10	Concurrence	0	Other
14	Dissent	2	Concurrence/dissent	Total =	34
Bench opinions = 33		Opinions relating to orders = 1		In-chambers opinions = 0
Unanimous opinions: 2		Most joined by: Scalia (15)		Least joined by: Ginsburg (3)

Type	Case	Citation	Issues	Joined by	Other opinions
	Koons Buick Pontiac GMC, Inc. v. Nigh	543 U.S. 50 (2004)			Ginsburg; Stevens; Kennedy; Scalia
	Kansas v. Colorado	543 U.S. 86 (2004)			Breyer; Stevens
	Kowalski v. Tesmer	543 U.S. 125 (2004)			Rehnquist; Ginsburg
	Cooper Indus. v. Aviall Servs.	543 U.S. 157 (2004)		Rehnquist, O'Connor, Scalia, Kennedy, Souter, Breyer	Ginsburg
	United States v. Booker	543 U.S. 220 (2005)			Stevens; Breyer; Stevens; Scalia; Breyer
	Clark v. Martinez	543 U.S. 371 (2005)		Rehnquist (in part)	Scalia; O'Connor
	Stewart v. Dutra Construction Co.	543 U.S. 481 (2005)		Stevens, O'Connor, Scalia, Kennedy, Souter, Ginsburg, Breyer	
Rehnquist did not participate.
	Johnson v. California	543 U.S. 499 (2005)		Scalia	O'Connor; Ginsburg; Stevens
	Shepard v. United States	543 U.S. 13 (2005)			Souter; O'Connor
	Jackson v. Birmingham Board of Education	544 U.S. 167 (2005)		Rehnquist, Scalia, Kennedy	O'Connor
	Rousey v. Jacoway	544 U.S. 320 (2005)		Unanimous	
	Pasquantino v. United States	544 U.S. 349 (2005)		Rehnquist, Stevens, O'Connor, Kennedy	Ginsburg
	Small v. United States	544 U.S. 385 (2005)		Scalia, Kennedy	Breyer
	Bates v. Dow Agrosciences, L.L.C.	544 U.S. 431 (2005)		Scalia	Stevens; Breyer
	Granholm v. Heald	544 U.S. 460 (2005)		Rehnquist, Stevens, O'Connor	Kennedy; Stevens
	Johanns v. Livestock Mktg. Ass'n	544 U.S. 550 (2005)			Scalia; Ginsburg; Breyer; Kennedy; Souter
	Clingman v. Beaver	544 U.S. 581 (2005)		Rehnquist, Scalia, Kennedy; O'Connor, Breyer (in part)	O'Connor; Stevens
	Deck v. Missouri	544 U.S. 622 (2005)		Scalia	Breyer
	Cutter v. Wilkinson	544 U.S. 709 (2005)	Religious Freedom Restoration Act		Ginsburg
	Tory v. Cochran	544 U.S. 734 (2005)		Scalia	Breyer
	Bell v. Quintero	544 U.S. 936 (2005)	U.S. Const. amend. VI • ineffective assistance of counsel	Rehnquist	
Thomas dissented from the Court's denial of certiorari, believing that the lower court's decision failed to follow the Court's ruling in Bell v. Cone.
	Gonzales v. Raich	545 U.S. 1 (2005)	Commerce Clause • prohibition of intrastate production of medical marijuana		Stevens; Scalia; O'Connor
	Spector v. Norwegian Cruise Line Ltd.	545 U.S. 119 (2005)	Americans with Disabilities Act • applicability to ships flying under foreign flags		Kennedy; Ginsburg; Scalia
	Johnson v. California	545 U.S. 162 (2005)			Stevens; Breyer
	Bradshaw v. Stumpf	545 U.S. 175 (2005)		Scalia	O'Connor; Souter
	Miller-El v. Dretke	545 U.S. 231 (2005)		Rehnquist, Scalia	Souter; Breyer
	Grable & Sons Metal Prod. v. Darue Engineering	545 U.S. 308 (2005)			Souter
	Graham Cty. Soil & Water Consv. Dist. v. United States ex rel. Wilson	545 U.S. 409 (2005)		Rehnquist, O'Connor, Scalia, Kennedy; Souter (in part)	Stevens; Breyer
	Am. Trucking Ass'ns v. Mich. PSC	545 U.S. 429 (2005)			Breyer; Scalia
	Kelo v. City of New London	545 U.S. 469 (2005)	U.S. Const. amend. V • state transfer of private property to new private owner for public purpose		Stevens; Kennedy; O'Connor
	Orff v. United States	545 U.S. 596 (2005)		Unanimous	
	Halbert v. Michigan	545 U.S. 605 (2005)		Scalia; Rehnquist (in part)	Ginsburg
	Van Orden v. Perry	545 U.S. 677 (2005)	U.S. Const. amend. I • Establishment Clause		Rehnquist; Scalia; Breyer; Stevens; O'Connor; Souter
	Nat'l Cable & Telecomms. Ass'n v. Brand X Internet Servs.	545 U.S. 967 (2005)		Rehnquist, Stevens, O'Connor, Kennedy, Breyer	Stevens; Breyer; Scalia
