= 2004 term United States Supreme Court opinions of Stephen Breyer =

The 2004 term of the Supreme Court of the United States began October 4, 2004, and concluded October 3, 2005. This was the eleventh term of Associate Justice Stephen Breyer's tenure on the Court.
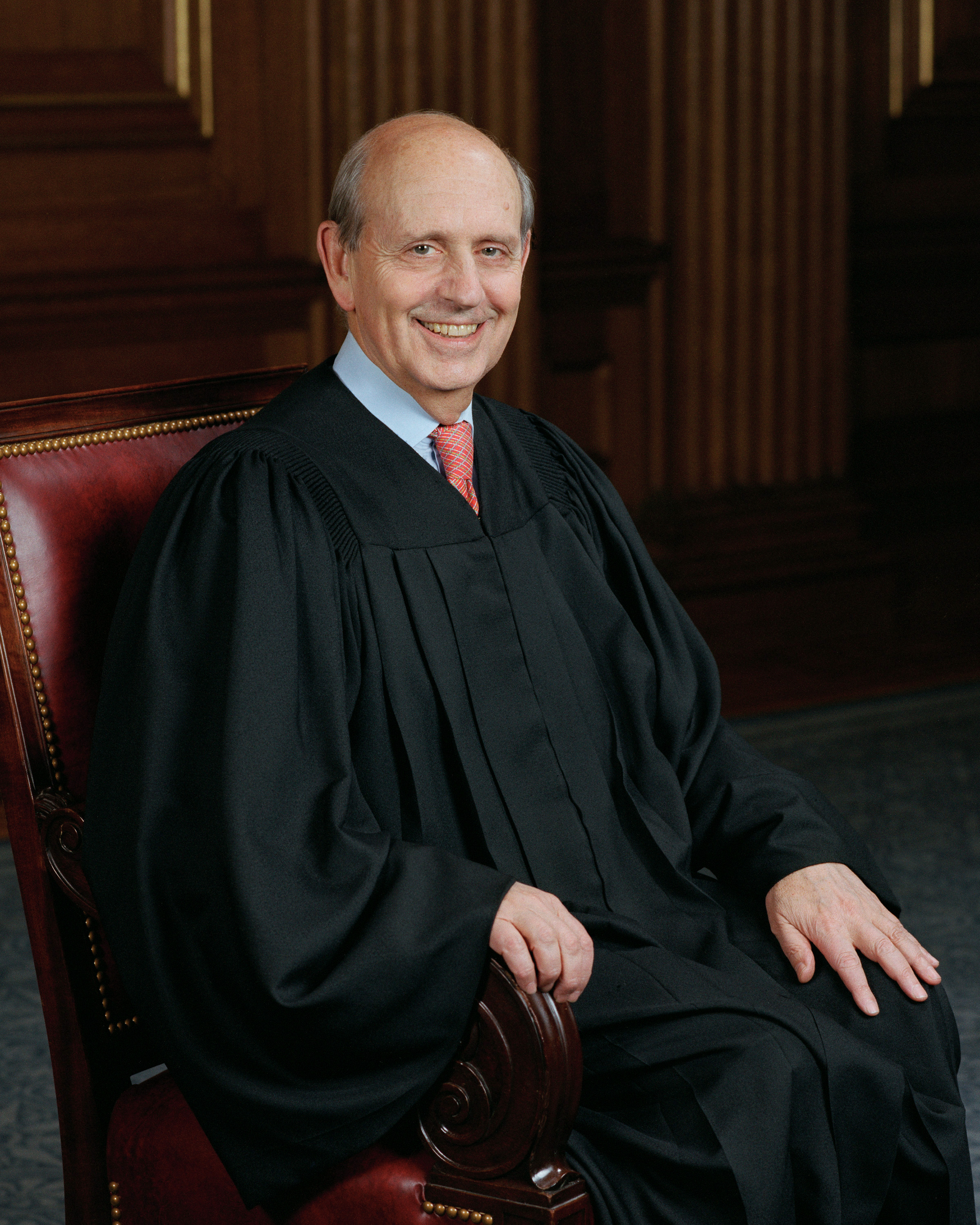

Stephen Breyer 2004 term statistics

10	Majority or plurality	11	Concurrence	0	Other
4	Dissent	0	Concurrence/dissent	Total =	25
Bench opinions = 25		Opinions relating to orders = 0		In-chambers opinions = 0
Unanimous opinions: 1		Most joined by: Ginsburg (14)		Least joined by: Scalia, Thomas (5)

Type	Case	Citation	Issues	Joined by	Other opinions
	Kansas v. Colorado	543 U.S. 86 (2004)		Rehnquist, O'Connor, Scalia, Kennedy, Souter, Ginsburg; Stevens, Thomas (in part)	Thomas; Stevens
	Brosseau v. Haugen	543 U.S. 194 (2004)		Scalia, Ginsburg	per curiam; Stevens
	United States v. Booker	543 U.S. 220 (2004)	right to jury trial	Rehnquist, O'Connor, Kennedy, Ginsburg	Stevens; Stevens; Scalia; Thomas; Breyer
Breyer filed one of two opinions for the Court.
	United States v. Booker	543 U.S. 220 (2004)		Rehnquist, O'Connor, Kennedy	Stevens; Breyer; Stevens; Scalia; Thomas
	Cherokee Nation v. Leavitt	543 U.S. 631 (2005)		Stevens, O'Connor, Kennedy, Souter, Thomas, Ginsburg	Scalia
	Wilkinson v. Dotson	544 U.S. 74 (2005)		Rehnquist, Stevens, O'Connor, Scalia, Souter, Thomas, Ginsburg	Scalia; Kennedy
	City of Rancho Palos Verdes v. Abrams	544 U.S. 113 (2005)		O'Connor, Souter, Ginsburg	Scalia; Stevens
	Brown v. Payton	544 U.S. 133 (2005)			Kennedy; Scalia; Souter
	Dura Pharmaceuticals v. Broudo	544 U.S. 336 (2005)	Securities regulation	Unanimous	
Breyer wrote for the Court in ruling that private actions under section 10(b) of the Exchange Act fail to state a claim if they allege no more than that the price of the stock was artificially inflated when purchased. Unless the price subsequently drops as a consequence of the market reacting to disclosure of the fraud, the stock purchaser has not suffered an injury.
	Small v. United States	544 U.S. 385 (2005)		Stevens, O'Connor, Souter, Ginsburg	Thomas
	Bates v. Dow Agrosciences, L.L.C.	544 U.S. 431 (2005)			Stevens; Thomas
	Johanns v. Livestock Mktg. Ass'n	544 U.S. 550 (2005)			Scalia; Thomas; Ginsburg; Kennedy; Souter
	Deck v. Missouri	544 U.S. 622 (2005)		Rehnquist, Stevens, O'Connor, Kennedy, Souter, Ginsburg	Thomas
	Medellin v. Dretke	544 U.S. 660 (2005)		Stevens	per curiam; Ginsburg; O'Connor; Souter
	Tory v. Cochran	544 U.S. 734 (2005)		Rehnquist, Stevens, O'Connor, Kennedy, Souter, Ginsburg	Thomas
	Johnson v. California	545 U.S. 162 (2005)			Stevens; Thomas
	Miller-El v. Dretke	545 U.S. 231 (2005)			Souter; Thomas
	Graham County Soil & Water Conservation Dist. v. United States ex rel. Wilson	545 U.S. 409 (2005)		Ginsburg	Thomas; Stevens
	Am. Trucking Ass'ns v. Mich. PSC	545 U.S. 429 (2005)		Rehnquist, Stevens, O'Connor, Kennedy, Souter, Ginsburg	Scalia; Thomas
	Mid-Con Freight Sys. v. Mich. PSC	545 U.S. 440 (2005)		Stevens, Scalia, Souter, Thomas, Ginsburg	Kennedy
	Gonzales v. Crosby	545 U.S. 524 (2005)			Scalia; Stevens
	Van Orden v. Perry	545 U.S. 677 (2005)	Establishment Clause		Rehnquist; Scalia; Thomas; Stevens; O'Connor; Souter
	Bell v. Thompson	545 U.S. 794 (2005)		Stevens, Souter, Ginsburg	Kennedy
	Metro-Goldwyn-Mayer Studios, Inc. v. Grokster, Ltd.	545 U.S. 913 (2005)	copyright law	Stevens, O'Connor	Souter; Ginsburg
	Nat'l Cable & Telecomms. Ass'n v. Brand X Internet Servs.	545 U.S. 967 (2005)	Communications		Thomas; Stevens; Scalia
