= 2004 term United States Supreme Court opinions of Ruth Bader Ginsburg =

The 2004 term of the Supreme Court of the United States began October 4, 2004, and concluded October 3, 2005. This was the twelfth term of Associate Justice Ruth Bader Ginsburg's tenure on the Court.
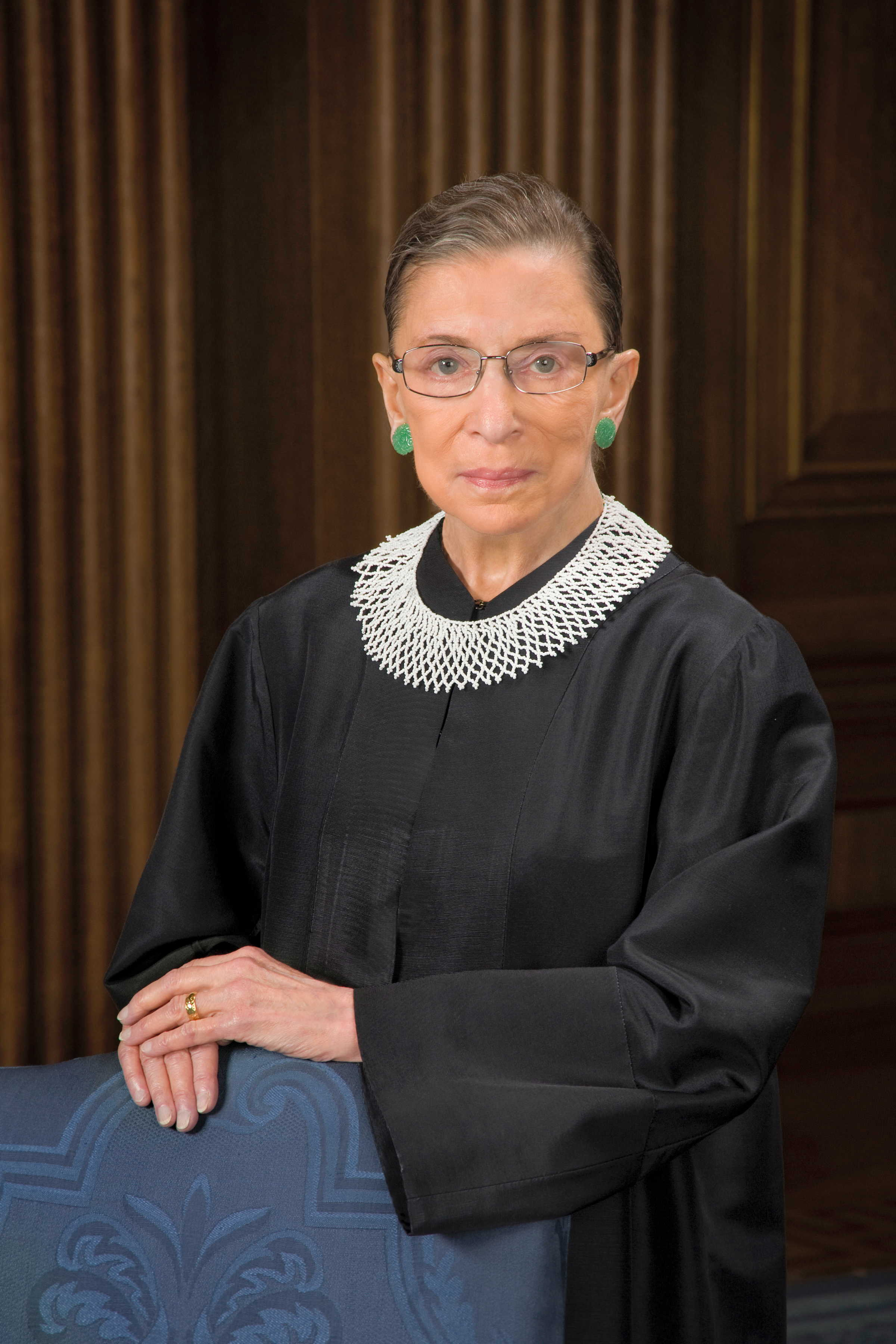

Ruth Bader Ginsburg 2004 term statistics

8	Majority or plurality	6	Concurrence	0	Other
7	Dissent	0	Concurrence/dissent	Total =	21
Bench opinions = 21		Opinions relating to orders = 0		In-chambers opinions = 0
Unanimous opinions: 2		Most joined by: Breyer (15)		Least joined by: Thomas (6)

Type	Case	Citation	Issues	Joined by	Other opinions
	Koons Buick Pontiac GMC, Inc. v. Nigh	543 U.S. 50 (2004)		Rehnquist, Stevens, O'Connor, Kennedy, Souter, Breyer	Stevens; Kennedy; Thomas; Scalia
	Kowalski v. Tesmer	543 U.S. 125 (2004)		Stevens, Souter	Rehnquist; Thomas
	Cooper Indus. v. Aviall Servs.	543 U.S. 157 (2004)		Stevens	Thomas
	Florida v. Nixon	543 U.S. 175 (2004)		Stevens, O'Connor, Scalia, Kennedy, Souter, Thomas, Breyer	
Rehnquist did not participate.
	Illinois v. Caballes	543 U.S. 405 (2005)	U.S. Const. amend. IV	Souter	Stevens; Souter
Ginsburg filed one of two dissents from Stevens' 6-2 decision upholding the constitutionality of a search for illegal drugs conducted without cause by a sniffing police dog during a traffic stop. Ginsburg wrote that the Court's decision "clears the way for suspicionless, dog-accompanied drug sweeps of parked cars along sidewalks and in parking lots. ... Nor would motorists have constitutional grounds for complaint should police with dogs, stationed at long traffic lights, circle cars waiting for the red signal to turn green."
	Bell v. Cone	543 U.S. 447 (2004)		Thomas, Breyer	per curiam
	Smith v. Massachusetts	543 U.S. 462 (2005)		Rehnquist, Kennedy, Breyer	Scalia
	Johnson v. California	543 U.S. 499 (2005)		Souter, Breyer	O'Connor; Stevens; Thomas
	Ballard v. Comm'r	544 U.S. 40 (2005)		Stevens, O'Connor, Scalia, Kennedy, Souter, Breyer	Kennedy; Rehnquist
	City of Sherrill v. Oneida Indian Nation	544 U.S. 197 (2005)		Rehnquist, O'Connor, Scalia, Kennedy, Souter, Thomas, Breyer	Souter; Stevens
	Exxon Mobil Corp. v. Saudi Basic Indus. Corp.	544 U.S. 280 (2005)		Unanimous	
	Pasquantino v. United States	544 U.S. 349 (2005)		Breyer; Scalia, Souter (in part)	Thomas
	Johanns v. Livestock Mktg. Ass'n	544 U.S. 550 (2005)			Scalia; Thomas; Breyer; Kennedy; Souter
	Medellin v. Dretke	544 U.S. 660 (2005)		Scalia (in part)	per curiam; O'Connor; Souter; Breyer
	Cutter v. Wilkinson	544 U.S. 709 (2005)	Religious Land Use and Institutionalized Persons Act	Unanimous	Thomas
	Spector v. Norwegian Cruise Line Ltd.	545 U.S. 119 (2005)	Americans with Disabilities Act	Breyer	Kennedy; Thomas; Scalia
	Dodd v. United States	545 U.S. 353 (2005)		Breyer	O'Connor; Stevens
	Exxon Mobil Corp. v. Allapattah Servs.	545 U.S. 546 (2005)		Stevens, O'Connor, Breyer	Kennedy; Stevens
	Halbert v. Michigan	545 U.S. 605 (2005)		Stevens, O'Connor, Kennedy, Souter, Breyer	Thomas
	Mayle v. Felix	545 U.S. 644 (2005)		Rehnquist, O'Connor, Scalia, Kennedy, Thomas, Breyer	Souter
	Metro-Goldwyn-Mayer Studios, Inc. v. Grokster, Ltd.	545 U.S. 913 (2005)	copyright law	Rehnquist, Kennedy	Souter; Breyer
Ginsburg also joined Souter's unanimous opinion.
