= 2004 term United States Supreme Court opinions of John Paul Stevens =

The 2004 term of the Supreme Court of the United States began October 4, 2004, and concluded October 3, 2005. This was the thirtieth term of Associate Justice John Paul Stevens's tenure on the Court.
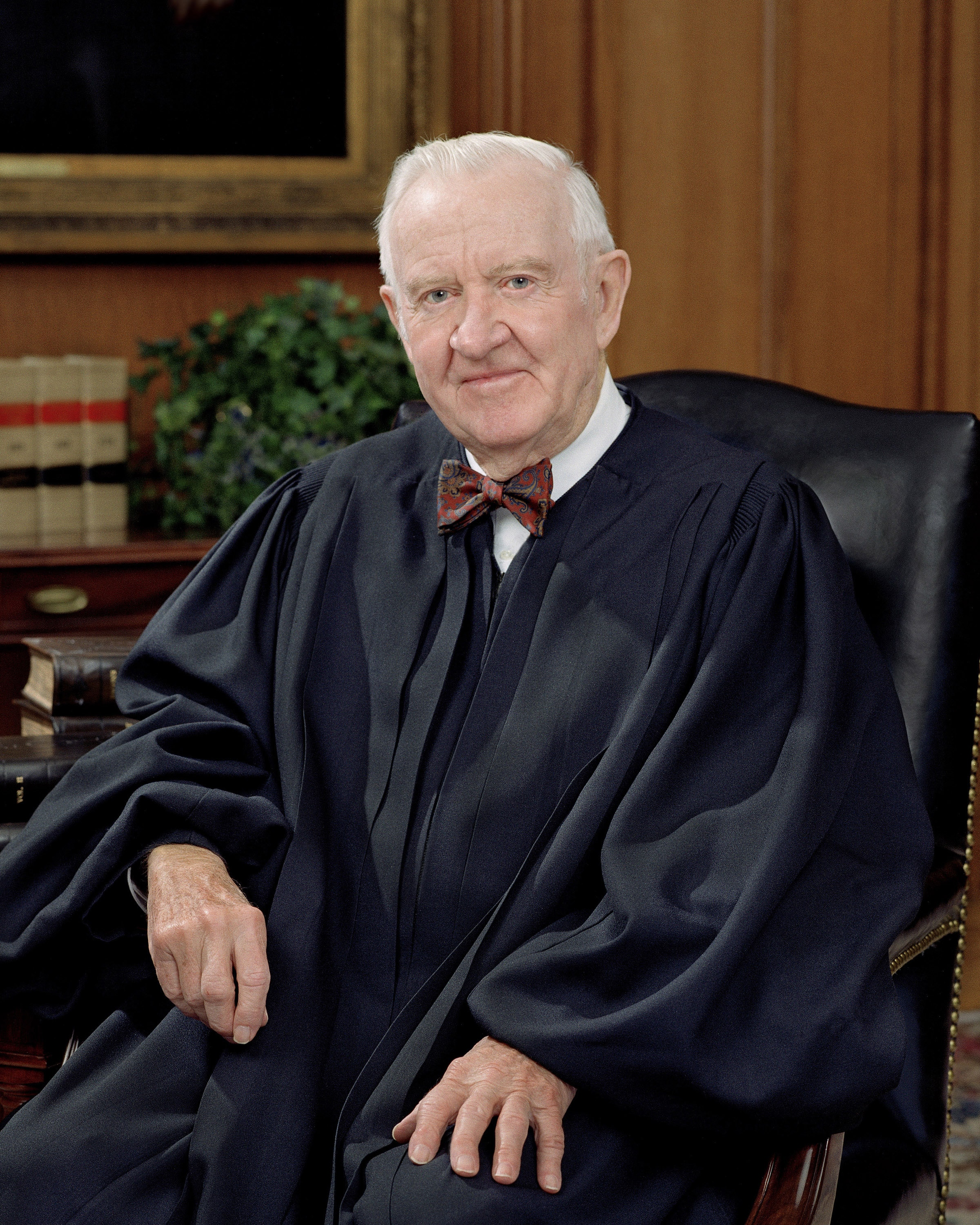

John Paul Stevens 2004 term statistics

8	Majority or plurality	9	Concurrence	2	Other
12	Dissent	1	Concurrence/dissent	Total =	32
Bench opinions = 29		Opinions relating to orders = 2		In-chambers opinions = 1
Unanimous opinions: 0		Most joined by: Ginsburg (16)		Least joined by: Rehnquist, Thomas (2)

Type	Case	Citation	Issues	Joined by	Other opinions
	Koons Buick Pontiac GMC, Inc. v. Nigh	543 U.S. 50 (2004)		Breyer	Ginsburg; Kennedy; Thomas; Scalia
	Kansas v. Colorado	543 U.S. 86 (2004)			Breyer; Thomas
	Brosseau v. Haugen	543 U.S. 194 (2004)			per curiam; Breyer
Stevens dissented from the Court's per curiam decision that ruled that a police officer who shot a suspect fleeing in an automobile was entitled to qualified immunity. Stevens argued that the officer's conduct was objectively unreasonable because deadly force should not have been used to prevent the suspect's escape. He also believed that the immunity issue should have been decided by a jury, and that the Court should have held full briefing and argument on the case.
	United States v. Booker	543 U.S. 220 (2005)	Right to a jury trial • determination of federal sentencing factors by judge	Scalia, Souter, Thomas, Ginsburg	Breyer; Stevens; Scalia; Thomas; Breyer
Stevens filed one of two opinions for the Court, each resolving different parts of the case; the other was filed by Breyer.
	United States v. Booker	543 U.S. 220 (2005)	Right to a jury trial • determination of federal sentencing factors by judge	Souter; Scalia (in part)	Stevens; Breyer; Scalia; Thomas; Breyer
Stevens filed one of three dissents from Breyer's opinion for the Court in part.
	Illinois v. Caballes	543 U.S. 405 (2005)		O'Connor, Scalia, Kennedy, Thomas, Breyer	Souter; Ginsburg
	Johnson v. California	543 U.S. 499 (2005)			O'Connor; Ginsburg; Thomas
	Roper v. Simmons	543 U.S. 551 (2005)	Death penalty • execution of minors	Ginsburg	Kennedy; O'Connor; Scalia
	Spencer v. Pugh	543 U.S. 1301 (2004)	Voter intimidation		
Stevens denied a stay.
	Kunkle v. Texas	543 U.S. 1309 (2004)			
Stevens concurred in the Court's denial of certiorari.
	Tenet v. Doe	544 U.S. 1 (2005)		Ginsburg	Rehnquist; Scalia
	Muehler v. Mena	544 U.S. 93 (2005)		Souter, Ginsburg, Breyer	Rehnquist; Kennedy
	City of Rancho Palos Verdes v. Abrams	544 U.S. 113 (2005)			Scalia; Breyer
	City of Sherrill v. Oneida Indian Nation	544 U.S. 197 (2005)			Ginsburg; Souter
	Smith v. City of Jackson	544 U.S. 228 (2005)		Souter, Ginsburg, Breyer; Scalia (in part)	O'Connor; Scalia
	Rhines v. Weber	544 U.S. 269 (2005)		Ginsburg, Breyer	O'Connor; Souter
	Pace v. DiGuglielmo	544 U.S. 408 (2005)		Souter, Ginsburg, Breyer	Rehnquist
	Bates v. Dow Agrosciences, L.L.C.	544 U.S. 431 (2005)		Rehnquist, O'Connor, Kennedy, Souter, Ginsburg, Breyer	Breyer; Thomas
	Granholm v. Heald	544 U.S. 460 (2005)		O'Connor	Kennedy; Thomas
	Clingman v. Beaver	544 U.S. 581 (2005)		Ginsburg; Souter (in part)	Thomas; O'Connor
	Evans v. Stephens	544 U.S. 942 (2005)			
Stevens filed an opinion respecting the Court's denial of certiorari to emphasize that the decision not to review the lower court's decision was not a judgment on the merits.
	Gonzales v. Raich	545 U.S. 1 (2005)	Commerce Clause • prohibition of state-sanctioned intrastate production of medical marijuana	Kennedy, Souter, Ginsburg, Breyer	Scalia; O'Connor; Thomas
	Johnson v. California	545 U.S. 162 (2005)		Rehnquist, O'Connor, Scalia, Kennedy, Souter, Ginsburg, Breyer	Breyer; Thomas
	San Remo Hotel, L.P. v. City & County of San Francisco	545 U.S. 323 (2005)		Scalia, Souter, Ginsburg, Breyer	Rehnquist
	Dodd v. United States	545 U.S. 353 (2005)		Souter, Ginsburg, Breyer (in part)	O'Connor; Ginsburg
	Graham Cty. Soil & Water Consv. Dist. v. United States ex rel. Wilson	545 U.S. 409 (2005)			Thomas; Breyer
	Kelo v. City of New London	545 U.S. 469 (2005)	Eminent domain	Kennedy, Souter, Ginsburg, Breyer	Kennedy; O'Connor; Thomas
	Gonzales v. Crosby	545 U.S. 524 (2005)		Souter	Scalia; Breyer
	Exxon Mobil Corp. v. Allapattah Servs.	545 U.S. 546 (2005)		Breyer	Kennedy; Ginsburg
	Van Orden v. Perry	545 U.S. 677 (2005)	Establishment Clause	Ginsburg	Rehnquist; Scalia; Thomas; Breyer; O'Connor; Souter
	Town of Castle Rock v. Gonzales	545 U.S. 748 (2005)	Due process right to enforce restraining order	Ginsburg	Scalia; Souter
	Nat'l Cable & Telecomms. Ass'n v. Brand X Internet Servs.	545 U.S. 967 (2005)	Telecommunications		Thomas; Breyer; Scalia
