= 2004 term United States Supreme Court opinions of Anthony Kennedy =

The 2004 term of the Supreme Court of the United States began October 4, 2004, and concluded October 3, 2005. This was the eighteenth term of Associate Justice Anthony Kennedy's tenure on the Court.
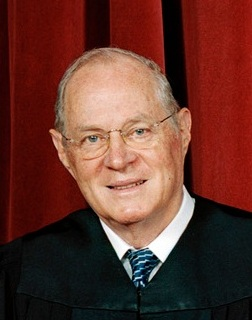

Anthony Kennedy 2004 term statistics

9	Majority or plurality	5	Concurrence	1	Other
5	Dissent	0	Concurrence/dissent	Total =	20
Bench opinions = 19		Opinions relating to orders = 0		In-chambers opinions = 1
Unanimous opinions: 1		Most joined by: Scalia (10)		Least joined by: Stevens, O'Connor (6)

Type	Case	Citation	Issues	Joined by	Other opinions
	Koons Buick Pontiac GMC, Inc. v. Nigh	543 U.S. 50 (2004)		Rehnquist	Ginsburg; Stevens; Thomas; Scalia
	Commissioner of Internal Revenue v. Banks	543 U.S. 426 (2005)		Stevens, O'Connor, Scalia, Souter, Thomas, Ginsburg, Breyer	
	Roper v. Simmons	543 U.S. 551 (2005)		Stevens, Souter, Ginsburg, Breyer	Stevens; O'Connor; Scalia
Kennedy wrote for the Court in ruling that the Eighth Amendment prohibited the execution of minors.
	Ballard v. Comm'r	544 U.S. 40 (2005)		Scalia	Ginsburg; Rehnquist
	Wilkinson v. Dotson	544 U.S. 74 (2005)			Breyer; Scalia
	Muehler v. Mena	544 U.S. 93 (2005)			Rehnquist; Stevens
	Brown v. Payton	544 U.S. 133 (2005)		O'Connor, Scalia, Thomas, Breyer	Scalia; Breyer; Souter
	Johnson v. United States	544 U.S. 295 (2005)		Stevens, Scalia, Ginsburg	Souter
	Granholm v. Heald	544 U.S. 460 (2005)		Scalia, Souter, Ginsburg, Breyer	Stevens; Thomas
	Lingle v. Chevron U.S.A., Inc.	544 U.S. 528 (2005)			O'Connor
	Johanns v. Livestock Mktg. Ass'n	544 U.S. 550 (2005)			Scalia; Thomas; Ginsburg; Breyer; Souter
	Multimedia Holdings Corp. v. Circuit Court of Fla., St. Johns Cty	544 U.S. 1301 (2005)	Freedom of the press		
Kennedy denied a television station's request for a stay against an order prohibiting publication of grand jury transcripts, because it did not appear that the station was actually subject to the order, and there was no real threat of prosecution for publishing the transcripts.
	Alaska v. United States	545 U.S. 75 (2005)		Stevens, O'Connor, Souter, Ginsburg, Breyer; Rehnquist, Scalia, Thomas (in part)	Scalia
	Spector v. Norwegian Cruise Line Ltd.	545 U.S. 119 (2005)	Americans with Disabilities Act	Stevens, Souter; Thomas, Ginsburg, Breyer (in part)	Ginsburg; Thomas; Scalia
	Wilkinson v. Austin	545 U.S. 209 (2005)		Unanimous	
	Rompilla v. Beard	545 U.S. 374 (2005)		Rehnquist, Scalia, Thomas	Souter; O'Connor
	Mid-Con Freight Sys. v. Mich. PSC	545 U.S. 440 (2005)		Rehnquist, O'Connor	Breyer
	Kelo v. City of New London	545 U.S. 469 (2005)			Stevens; O'Connor; Thomas
	Exxon Mobil Corp. v. Allapattah Servs.	545 U.S. 546 (2005)		Rehnquist, Scalia, Souter, Thomas	Stevens; Ginsburg
	Bell v. Thompson	545 U.S. 794 (2005)		Rehnquist, O'Connor, Scalia, Thomas	Breyer
