= 2004 term United States Supreme Court opinions of Antonin Scalia =

The 2004 term of the Supreme Court of the United States began October 4, 2004, and concluded October 3, 2005. This was the nineteenth term of Associate Justice Antonin Scalia's tenure on the Court.
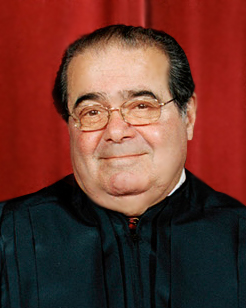

Antonin Scalia 2004 term statistics

9	Majority or plurality	8	Concurrence	0	Other
7	Dissent	1	Concurrence/dissent	Total =	25
Bench opinions = 25		Opinions relating to orders = 0		In-chambers opinions = 0
Unanimous opinions: 1		Most joined by: Thomas (14)		Least joined by: Stevens (4)

Type	Case	Citation	Issues	Joined by	Other opinions
	Smith v. Texas	543 U.S. 37 (2004)	death penalty • jury consideration of mitigation evidence	Thomas	per curiam
Scalia dissented from the Court's per curiam decision to reverse a Texas state court death sentence because of incorrect jury instructions regarding mitigation. Scalia merely stated without elaboration that he would have affirmed the sentence.
	Koons Buick Pontiac GMC, Inc. v. Nigh	543 U.S. 50 (2004)			Ginsburg; Stevens; Kennedy; Thomas
	Devenpeck v. Alford	543 U.S. 146 (2004)		Stevens, O'Connor, Kennedy, Souter, Thomas, Ginsburg, Breyer	
Rehnquist did not participate.
	United States v. Booker	543 U.S. 220 (2005)	U.S. Const. amend. VI		Stevens; Breyer; Stevens; Thomas; Breyer
Scalia joined Stevens' partial majority opinion in part, as well as Stevens' partial dissent, and wrote a separate partial dissent. The Court had ruled that the United States Sentencing Guidelines were unconstitutional to the extent that they required judges to increase sentences based upon their own finding of facts not found by a jury. Though the statutory standard for appellate review of sentences was structured to check compliance with the Guidelines, the Court found that once compliance was no longer mandatory that provision for review was severed and a different standard of reviewing for "unreasonableness" could be implied. Scalia wrote separately to criticize this latter aspect of the decision as contrary to the principle that there was no appellate review beyond that expressly defined by statute. He wrote that "[t]he question is, when the Court has severed that standard of review, does it make any sense to look for some congressional 'implication' of a different standard of review in the remnants of the statute that the Court has left standing? Only in Wonderland."
	Clark v. Martinez	543 U.S. 371 (2005)	Illegal aliens	Stevens, O'Connor, Kennedy, Souter, Ginsburg, Breyer	O'Connor; Thomas
The Court ruled that aliens inadmissible under 8 U.S.C. § 1182 could not be indefinitely detained, but only for the period of time necessary to effect their removal. Aliens detained longer than the six-month presumptive necessary time are entitled to habeas corpus relief. This ruling derived from Zadvydas v. Davis, 533 U.S. 678 (2001), which had interpreted the detention limitation in regard to another category of aliens within the same statute. The Court ruled that the statute gave no reason to give different constructions to the limitation based on the different categories.
	Jama v. Immigration & Customs Enforcement	543 U.S. 335 (2005)	Illegal aliens	Rehnquist, O'Connor, Kennedy, Thomas	Souter
Scalia's 5-justice majority ruled that the removal of aliens by the Attorney General under 8 U.S.C. § 1231(b)(2) does not require advance acceptance by the receiving country. The statute instead sets forth a four-step process for determining where an alien should be deported, of which willing acceptance is only a requirement for the final step.
	Smith v. Massachusetts	543 U.S. 462 (2005)	Double Jeopardy Clause	Stevens, O'Connor, Souter, Thomas	Ginsburg
Scalia's 5-justice majority ruled that a judge's midtrial acquittal of a defendant of one of three offenses charged could not be reconsidered, where the trial had proceeded to the defendant's introduction of evidence. There was no indication that the judgment was non-final, and such reconsideration was not established by a pre-existing rule.
	Roper v. Simmons	543 U.S. 551 (2005)	death penalty • execution of minors	Rehnquist, Thomas	Kennedy; Stevens; O'Connor
Scalia believed the Court’s invalidation of state death penalty laws was an un-democratic legislative usurpation, particularly through its reliance on studies and personal moral conclusions about the psychological maturity and culpability of minors. He believed that whether there was a national consensus on the issue, which there wasn't, was also irrelevant as to whether the Eighth Amendment prohibited the execution of juveniles. What was relevant was instead what the Amendment was intended to prohibit at the time of its enactment. Scalia also took issue with the Court's use of international law, dismissing the invocation of a treaty that the U.S. had refused to ratify, and claimed that the Court was selective in which foreign law it would consider, in light of how many other areas of law the Court's rulings diverged from international trends.
	Cherokee Nation v. Leavitt	543 U.S. 631 (2005)			Breyer
Scalia joined the court except for its use of a Senate Committee Report to construe the statute at issue, a disagreement that he voiced in his brief concurrence. He believed "[t]hat source at most indicates the intent of one committee of one Chamber of Congress—and realistically, probably not even that, since there is no requirement that committee members vote on, and small probability that they even read, the entire text of a staff-generated report. It is a legal fiction to say that this expresses the intent of the United States Congress. And it is in any event not the inadequately expressed intent of the Congress, but the meaning of what it enacted, that we should be looking for. The only virtue of this cited source (and its entire allure) is that it says precisely what the Court wants."
	Tenet v. Doe	544 U.S. 1 (2005)			Rehnquist; Stevens
Scalia joined the Court's unanimous opinion, and filed a separate concurrence to explain that he joined it "because I do not agree with Justice Stevens's concurrence, painting today's action as a vindication of his opinion concurring in the judgment in Steel Co. v. Citizens for Better Environment, 523 U.S. 83, 112 (1998), in which he would have held that a jurisdictional bar does not prevent the resolution of a merits issue."
	Wilkinson v. Dotson	544 U.S. 13 (2005)	Habeas corpus	Thomas	Breyer; Kennedy
Scalia wrote separately to observe that a contrary holding that would have permitted habeas petitions to compel parole hearings would require the Court "to broaden the scope of habeas relief beyond recognition."
	City of Rancho Palos Verdes v. Abrams	544 U.S. 113 (2005)		Rehnquist, O'Connor, Kennedy, Souter, Thomas, Ginsburg, Breyer	Stevens; Breyer
	Brown v. Payton	544 U.S. 133 (2005)	death penalty	Thomas	Kennedy; Breyer; Souter
Scalia wrote briefly to state that "even if our review were not circumscribed by statute, I would adhere to my view that limiting a jury's discretion to consider all mitigating evidence does not violate the Eighth Amendment."
	Smith v. City of Jackson	544 U.S. 228 (2005)			Stevens; O'Connor
Scalia joined in the judgment of the Court, and joined all except Part III of its opinion. He wrote separately to explain that although he agreed with all of the Court's reasoning in Part III, he "would find it a basis, not for independent determination of the disparate-impact question, but for deferral to the reasonable views of the Equal Employment Opportunity Commission (EEOC or Commission) pursuant to Chevron U.S.A., Inc. v. Natural Resources Defense Council, Inc., 467 U.S. 837 (1984). This is an absolutely classic case for deference to agency interpretation."
	Johanns v. Livestock Mktg. Ass'n	544 U.S. 550 (2005)	U.S. Const. amend. I • compelled speech	Rehnquist, O'Connor, Thomas, Breyer	Thomas; Ginsburg; Breyer; Kennedy; Souter
Scalia's 5-justice majority ruled that requiring funding for a federal program that finances generic advertising to promote an agricultural product does not violate the First Amendment. Kennedy and Souter dissented.
	Gonzales v. Raich	545 U.S. 1 (2005)	Commerce Clause		Stevens; O'Connor; Thomas
Scalia concurred separately to clarify that "Congress's regulatory authority over intrastate activities that are not themselves part of interstate commerce (including activities that have a substantial effect on interstate commerce) derives from the Necessary and Proper Clause." He considered this interpretation "if not inconsistent with that of the Court, at least more nuanced."
	Alaska v. United States	545 U.S. 75 (2005)	Original jurisdiction suit between Alaska and United States regarding title to submerged lands	Rehnquist, Thomas	Kennedy
Scalia joined all of the Court's opinion dealing with a land dispute between Alaska and the United States, except for Part V and the related portions of Part VI. Scalia did not agree with the Court's conclusion that the United States expressly retained title to submerged lands within Glacier Bay National Monument at the time of Alaskan statehood, finding that there was no plain or express retention of those lands by the United States. Scalia also criticized Court’s concern with U.S. ability to protect brown bears from hunting. "Surely this is irrelevant to interpretation of the Alaska Statehood Act, unless there is some principle of construction that texts say what the Supreme Court thinks they ought to have said."
	Spector v. Norwegian Cruise Line Ltd.	545 U.S. 119 (2005)	Americans with Disabilities Act	Rehnquist, O'Connor; Thomas (in part)	Kennedy; Ginsburg; Thomas
Scalia dissented from the plurality's judgment that the Americans with Disabilities Act applied to cruise ships flying under foreign flags. Scalia believed that because there must be a clear statement of Congressional intent to apply its laws to foreign ships when those laws would interfere with the ship's internal order, and the Act had "no clear statement of coverage."
	Merck KGaA v. Integra Lifesciences I, Ltd.	545 U.S. 193 (2005)	patent law	Unanimous	
Scalia's unanimous judgment ruled that the use of patented compounds in preclinical studies was protected under 35 U.S.C. § 271(e)(1) at least as long as there was a reasonable basis to believe that the compound tested could be the subject of an FDA submission and the experiments would produce the types of information relevant to drug applications under 21 U.S.C. § 355.
	Am. Trucking Ass'ns v. Mich. PSC	545 U.S. 429 (2005)	Commerce Clause • Dormant Commerce Clause		Breyer; Thomas
Though Scalia agreed with the Court's holding, he "reach[ed] that determination without adverting to various tests from our wardrobe of ever-changing negative Commerce Clause fashions." He instead believed the test should simply be "whether the fee facially discriminates against interstate commerce and whether it is indistinguishable from a type of law previously held unconstitutional by this Court."
	Gonzalez v. Crosby	545 U.S. 524 (2005)	habeas corpus	Rehnquist, O'Connor, Kennedy, Thomas, Ginsburg, Breyer	Breyer; Stevens
Scalia's 7-justice majority ruled that the petitioner's Rule 60(b) motion, which challenged only the District Court's previous ruling on AEDPA's statute of limitations, was not the equivalent of a successive habeas petition and could be ruled upon by the District Court without precertification by the Eleventh Circuit.
	Van Orden v. Perry	545 U.S. 677 (2005)			Rehnquist; Thomas; Breyer; Stevens; O'Connor; Souter
Scalia joined Rehnquist's plurality opinion, and concurred separately to explain that the plurality "accurately reflects our current Establishment Clause jurisprudence—or at least the Establishment Clause jurisprudence we currently apply some of the time. I would prefer to reach the same result by adopting an Establishment Clause jurisprudence that is in accord with our Nation's past and present practices, and that can be consistently applied—the central relevant feature of which is that there is nothing unconstitutional in a State's favoring religion generally, honoring God through public prayer and acknowledgment, or, in a nonproselytizing manner, venerating the Ten Commandments.
	Town of Castle Rock v. Gonzales	545 U.S. 748 (2005)	Due Process Clause	Rehnquist, O'Connor, Kennedy, Souter, Thomas, Breyer	Souter; Stevens
Scalia's 7-justice majority ruled that an individual who has obtained a state-law restraining order does not have a constitutionally protected property interest in having the police enforce the restraining order when they have probable cause to believe it has been violated.
	McCreary County v. ACLU	545 U.S. 844 (2005)	Establishment Clause	Rehnquist, Thomas; Kennedy (in part)	Souter; O'Connor
Scalia dissented from Souter's five-justice opinion. He believed that "the Court's oft repeated assertion that the government cannot favor religious practice is false;" that "today's opinion extends the scope of that falsehood even beyond prior cases;" and that "even on the basis of the Court's false assumptions the judgment here is wrong."
	Nat'l Cable & Telecomms. Ass'n v. Brand X Internet Servs.	545 U.S. 967 (2005)	Telecommunications	Souter, Ginsburg (in part)	Thomas; Stevens; Breyer
Scalia dissented from Thomas' 6–3 decision, believing that the FCC "has once again attempted to concoct a whole new regime of regulation (or of free-market competition) under the guise of statutory construction. Actually, in these cases, it might be more accurate to say the Commission has attempted to establish a whole new regime of non-regulation, which will make for more or less free-market competition, depending upon whose experts are believed. The important fact, however, is that the Commission has chosen to achieve this through an implausible reading of the statute, and has thus exceeded the authority given it by Congress."
