= 2004 term United States Supreme Court opinions of Sandra Day O'Connor =

The 2004 term of the Supreme Court of the United States began October 4, 2004, and concluded October 3, 2005. This was the twenty-fourth term of Associate Justice Sandra Day O'Connor's tenure on the Court.
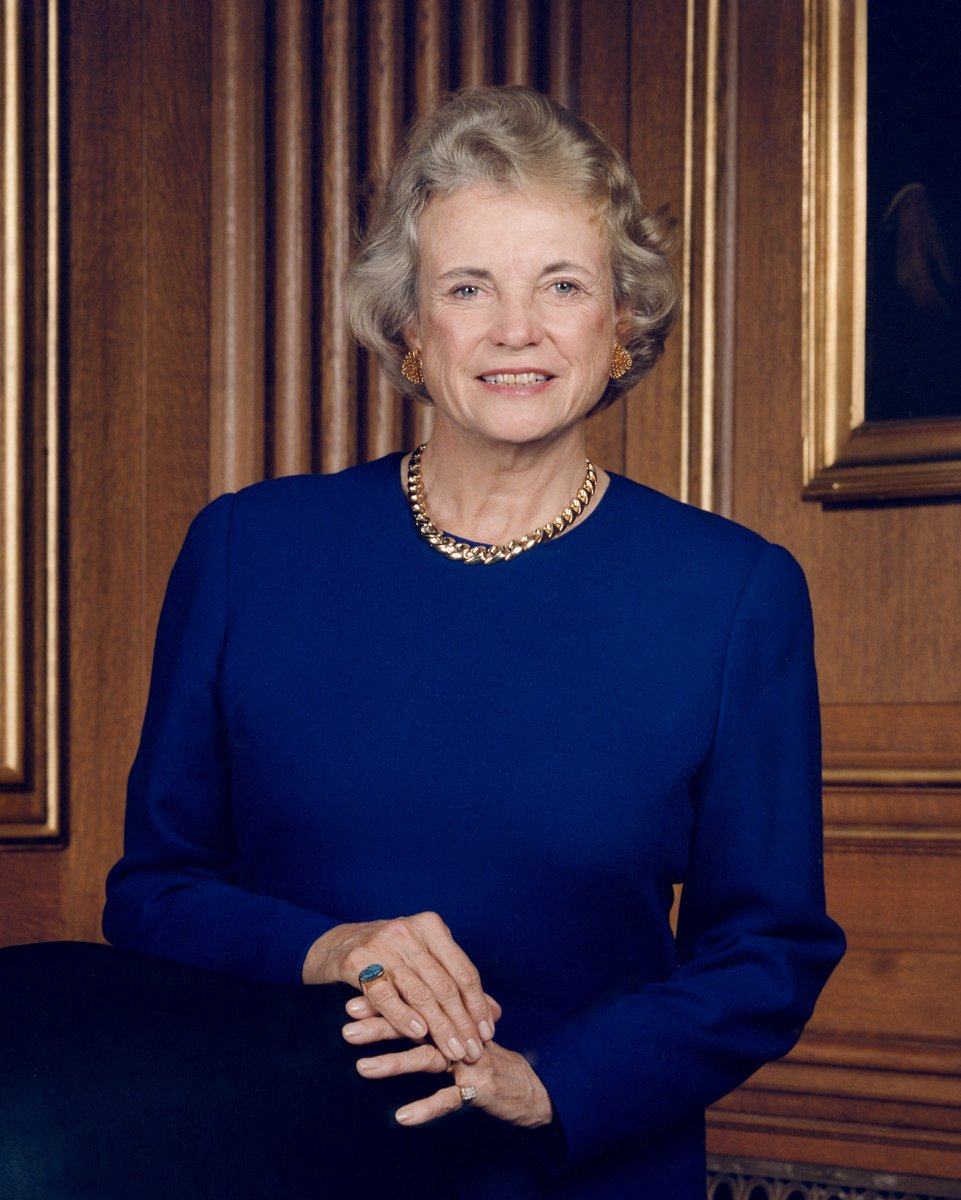

Sandra Day O'Connor 2004 term statistics

8	Majority or plurality	5	Concurrence	0	Other
6	Dissent	0	Concurrence/dissent	Total =	19
Bench opinions = 19		Opinions relating to orders = 0		In-chambers opinions = 0
Unanimous opinions: 4		Most joined by: Breyer (10)		Least joined by: Rehnquist, Stevens, Scalia, Souter, Ginsburg (7)

Type	Case	Citation	Issues	Joined by	Other opinions
	Norfolk Southern Ry. v. James N. Kirby, Pty Ltd.	543 U.S. 14 (2004)		Unanimous	
	Whitfield v. United States	543 U.S. 209 (2005)		Unanimous	
	Clark v. Martinez	543 U.S. 371 (2005)			Scalia; Thomas
	Johnson v. California	543 U.S. 499 (2005)		Kennedy, Souter, Ginsburg, Breyer	Ginsburg; Stevens; Thomas
	Roper v. Simmons	543 U.S. 551 (2005)			Kennedy; Stevens; Scalia
	Shepard v. United States	544 U.S. 13 (2005)		Kennedy, Breyer	Souter; Thomas
	Jackson v. Birmingham Board of Education	544 U.S. 167 (2005)		Stevens, Souter, Ginsburg, Breyer	Thomas
	Smith v. City of Jackson	544 U.S. 228 (2005)		Kennedy, Thomas	Stevens; Scalia
	Rhines v. Weber	544 U.S. 269 (2005)		Rehnquist, Stevens, Scalia, Kennedy, Thomas, Ginsburg, Breyer	Stevens; Souter
	Lingle v. Chevron U.S.A., Inc.	544 U.S. 528 (2005)		Unanimous	Kennedy
	Clingman v. Beaver	544 U.S. 581 (2005)		Breyer (in part)	Thomas; Stevens
	Medellin v. Dretke	544 U.S. 660 (2005)		Stevens, Souter, Breyer	per curiam; Ginsburg; Souter; Breyer
O'Connor dissented from the Court's per curiam decision to dismiss certiorari as improvidently granted, arguing that the Court's dismissal was based on speculation as to what the state court might do. O'Connor preferred to remand the case with instructions to consider whether the decision of the ICJ was binding on American courts, and to what extent the Convention created enforceable rights that could not be forfeited through procedural default.
	Gonzales v. Raich	545 U.S. 1 (2006)	Commerce Clause • medical marijuana • Controlled Substances Act	Rehnquist, Thomas (in part)	Stevens; Scalia; Thomas
	Bradshaw v. Stumpf	545 U.S. 175 (2005)		Unanimous	Souter; Thomas
	Dodd v. United States	545 U.S. 353 (2005)		Rehnquist, Scalia, Kennedy, Thomas	Stevens; Ginsburg
	Rompilla v. Beard	545 U.S. 374 (2005)			Souter; Kennedy
	Kelo v. City of New London	545 U.S. 469 (2005)	Fifth Amendment • eminent domain	Rehnquist, Scalia, Thomas	Stevens; Kennedy; Thomas
	Van Orden v. Perry	545 U.S. 644 (2005)	First Amendment • Establishment Clause		Rehnquist; Scalia; Thomas; Breyer; Stevens; Souter
	McCreary County v. ACLU	545 U.S. 844 (2005)	First Amendment • Establishment Clause		Souter; Scalia
