= 2004 term United States Supreme Court opinions of William Rehnquist =

The 2004 term of the Supreme Court of the United States began October 4, 2004, and concluded October 3, 2005. This was the thirty-third and final term of Chief Justice William Rehnquist's tenure on the Court and the nineteenth term as Chief Justice; Rehnquist died on September 3, 2005.
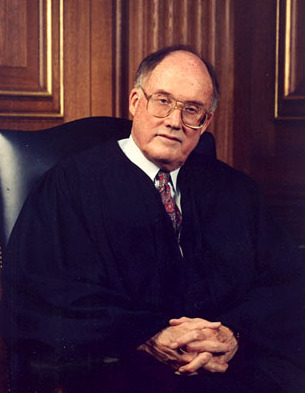

William Rehnquist 2004 term statistics

7	Majority or plurality	1	Concurrence	0	Other
1	Dissent	0	Concurrence/dissent	Total =	9
Bench opinions = 9		Opinions relating to orders = 0		In-chambers opinions = 0
Unanimous opinions: 3		Most joined by: Thomas (9)		Least joined by: Stevens, Souter, Ginsburg (3)

Type	Case	Citation	Issues	Joined by	Other opinions
	Leocal v. Ashcroft	543 U.S. 1 (2004)		Unanimous	
	Kowalski v. Tesmer	543 U.S. 125 (2004)		O'Connor, Scalia, Kennedy, Thomas, Breyer	Thomas; Ginsburg
	Tenet v. Doe	544 U.S. 1 (2004)		Unanimous	Stevens; Scalia
	Ballard v. Comm'r	544 U.S. 40 (2004)		Thomas	Ginsburg; Kennedy
	Muehler v. Mena	544 U.S. 93 (2004)		O'Connor, Scalia, Kennedy, Thomas	Stevens; Kennedy
	Pace v. DiGuglielmo	544 U.S. 408 (2004)		O'Connor, Scalia, Kennedy, Thomas	Stevens
	Arthur Andersen LLP v. United States	544 U.S. 696 (2004)		Unanimous	
	San Remo Hotel, L.P. v. City & County of San Francisco	544 U.S. 323 (2004)		O'Connor, Kennedy, Thomas	Stevens
	Van Orden v. Perry	544 U.S. 677 (2004)	Establishment Clause	Scalia, Kennedy, Thomas	Scalia; Thomas; Breyer; Stevens; O'Connor; Souter
