= 2004 term United States Supreme Court opinions of David Souter =

The 2004 term of the Supreme Court of the United States began October 4, 2004, and concluded October 3, 2005. This was the fifteenth term of Associate Justice David Souter's tenure on the Court.
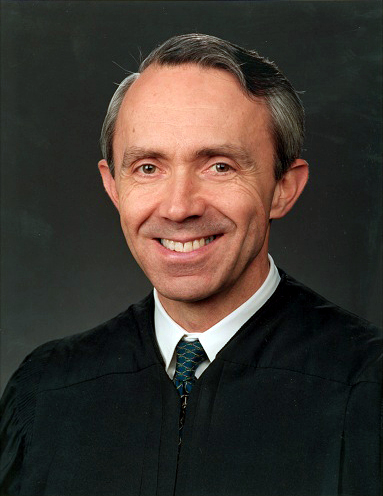

David Souter 2004 term statistics

8	Majority or plurality	4	Concurrence	1	Other
7	Dissent	0	Concurrence/dissent	Total =	20
Bench opinions = 19		Opinions relating to orders = 0		In-chambers opinions = 1
Unanimous opinions: 2		Most joined by: Stevens, Ginsburg (12)		Least joined by: Rehnquist, Scalia (4)

Type	Case	Citation	Issues	Joined by	Other opinions
	KP Permanent Make-Up, Inc. v. Lasting Impression I, Inc.	543 U.S. 111 (2004)		Rehnquist, Stevens, O'Connor, Kennedy, Thomas, Ginsburg; Scalia, Breyer (in part)	
	Jama v. Immigration & Customs Enforcement	543 U.S. 335 (2005)		Stevens, Ginsburg, Breyer	Scalia
	Illinois v. Caballes	543 U.S. 405 (2005)			Stevens; Ginsburg
	Democratic National Committee v. Republican National Committee	543 U.S. 1304 (2005)			
Souter denied an application for a stay.
	Shephard v. United States	544 U.S. 13 (2005)		Stevens, Scalia, Ginsburg; Thomas (in part)	Thomas; O'Connor
	Brown v. Payton	544 U.S. 133 (2005)		Stevens, Ginsburg	Kennedy; Scalia; Breyer
	City of Sherrill v. Oneida Indian Nation	544 U.S. 197 (2005)			Ginsburg; Stevens
	Rhines v. Weber	544 U.S. 269 (2005)		Ginsburg, Breyer	O'Connor; Stevens
	Johnson v. United States	544 U.S. 295 (2005)		Rehnquist, O'Connor, Thomas, Breyer	Kennedy
	Johanns v. Livestock Mktg. Ass'n	544 U.S. 550 (2005)		Stevens, Kennedy	Scalia; Thomas; Ginsburg; Breyer; Kennedy
	Medellin v. Dretke	544 U.S. 660 (2005)			per curiam; Ginsburg; O'Connor; Breyer
	Bradshaw v. Stumpf	545 U.S. 175 (2005)		Ginsburg	O'Connor; Thomas
	Miller-El v. Dretke	545 U.S. 231 (2005)		Stevens, O'Connor, Kennedy, Ginsburg, Breyer	Breyer; Thomas
	Grable & Sons Metal Prod. v. Darue Engineering	545 U.S. 308 (2005)		Unanimous	Thomas
	Rompilla v. Beard	545 U.S. 374 (2005)		Stevens, O'Connor, Ginsburg, Breyer	O'Connor; Kennedy
	Mayle v. Felix	545 U.S. 644 (2005)		Stevens	Ginsburg
	Van Orden v. Perry	545 U.S. 677 (2005)		Stevens, Ginsburg	Rehnquist; Scalia; Thomas; Breyer; Stevens; O'Connor
	Town of Castle Rock v. Gonzales	545 U.S. 748 (2005)		Breyer	Scalia; Stevens
	McCreary County v. ACLU	545 U.S. 844 (2005)	Establishment Clause	Stevens, O'Connor, Ginsburg, Breyer	O'Connor; Scalia
	Metro-Goldwyn-Mayer Studios, Inc. v. Grokster, Ltd.	545 U.S. 913 (2005)	copyright	Unanimous	Ginsburg; Breyer
