= John Wetzel =

John Wetzel may refer to:

- John Wetzel (basketball) (born 1944), former professional basketball player
- John Wetzel (American football) (born 1991), professional American football player
- John Wetzel (Pennsylvania official), Pennsylvania Secretary of Corrections
- John Wetzel (Michigan politician), Michigan state senator
- John Wetzel (Wyoming politician), Wyoming state representative
