= Pasquantino v. United States =

- Supreme Court of the United States

Argued November 9, 2004 Decided April 26, 2005
- Full case name: David B. Pasquantino, Carl J. Pasquantino, and Arthur Hilts, Petitioners v. United States
- Docket no.: 03-725
- Citations: 544 U.S. 349 (more)
- Argument: Oral argument

Case history
- Prior: Convictions affirmed, 336 F.3d 321 (4th Cir. 2003); Convictions reversed, 305 F.3d 291 (4th Cir. 2002)

Holding
- A plot to defraud a foreign government of tax revenue violates the federal wire fraud statute.

Court membership
- Chief Justice William Rehnquist Associate Justices John P. Stevens · Sandra Day O'Connor; Antonin Scalia · Anthony Kennedy; David Souter · Clarence Thomas; Ruth Bader Ginsburg · Stephen Breyer

Case opinions
- Majority: Thomas, joined by Rehnquist, Stevens, O’Connor, Kennedy
- Dissent: Ginsburg, joined by Breyer; Scalia, Souter (parts II-III)

Laws applied
- 18 U.S. Code § 1343. Fraud by wire, radio, or television

Pasquantino v. United States, 544 U.S. 349 (2005), is a United States Supreme Court case in which the Court held that a plot to defraud a foreign government of tax revenue violates the federal wire fraud statute.

== Background ==
Prior to 1996, Canada raised the excise tax on liquors such that Canadian excise taxes greatly exceeded comparable United States taxes. From 1996-2000, Carl and David Pasquantino purchased large amounts of liquor over the phone from discount stores in Maryland. In order to avoid paying Canadian excise tax on imported alcohol, they hired individuals to smuggle the liquor over the border by automobile. The Federal Bureau of Alcohol, Tobacco, Firearms, and Explosives learned about the smuggling operation and investigated, leading to the arrest of the Pasquantinos and their associates.

=== Federal district court ===
The smuggling operation did not violate any federal alcohol statute or any applicable anti-smuggling statute, so the Pasquantinos and one of their conspirators, Arthur Hilts, were indicted under the federal wire fraud statute, 18 U.S.C. § 1343. The statute prohibits using wires, radio, or television to conduct "any scheme or artifice to defraud, or for obtaining money or property by means of false or fraudulent pretenses, representations, or promises." The statute was implicated when the Pasquantinos ordered alcohol over the phone.

Before trial, the Pasquantinos and Hilts asked the court for a dismissal, claiming that the government did not have a sufficient interest in enforcing Canadian revenue laws and that the Canadian tax revenue did not constitute property under the wire fraud statute; the court denied the motion and the case went to trial. The Pasquantinos were convicted by a jury and sentenced to 57 months in prison for each of six counts, to be served concurrently, and Hilts to 21 months in prison.

Canada also indicted the men for tax fraud, but had not adjudicated the claim before the U.S. criminal court made its determination.

=== Federal appeals court ===
The Pasquantinos and Hilts appealed to the United States Court of Appeals for the Fourth Circuit. The Fourth Circuit initially vacated the convictions in a 2-1 panel decision, deciding that the prosecutions violated the common law revenue rule. According to the Restatement (Third) of Foreign Relations Law of the United States, the "revenue rule" means that “[c]ourts in the United States are not required to recognize or to enforce judgments for the collection of taxes, fines, or penalties rendered by the courts of other states.” The panel reasoned that the prosecutions violated the rule because they required U.S. courts to interpret and enforce foreign revenue law.

The Fourth Circuit granted a rehearing en banc, vacating the earlier ruling and reinstating the convictions by a 9-2 vote. According to the en banc court, the revenue rule was inapplicable to the prosecutions because the rule was intended only to bar enforcement of a foreign judgment in U.S. courts.

The Fourth Circuit decision deepened a circuit split. The Second Circuit had held the revenue rule inapplicable, and that prosecutions for operations to defraud foreign government are not barred by the federal wire fraud statute; the First Circuit had vacated such convictions, reasoning that the convictions were penal enforcement of foreign laws and ran afoul of underlying purposes of the common law revenue rule.

== Supreme Court ==
The Supreme Court granted a writ of certiorari, noting the split among circuit courts on the applicability of the federal wire fraud statute in cases where a scheme to defraud involves foreign tax revenue.

=== Majority opinion ===
In a 5–4 decision, Justice Thomas delivered the opinion of the court, joined by Justices Rehnquist, Stevens, O'Connor, and Kennedy. The court held that prosecution for international tax fraud was possible in U.S. court under the federal wire fraud statute. The majority concluded first, that the petitioner's acts fell within the literal terms of the wire fraud statute; second, that the prosecutions did not violate the common law revenue rule; and third, that no underlying purpose of the rule suggested it should apply to the prosecutions.

The court applied the modern definition of the common law revenue rule, which prevents "courts of one sovereign [from] enforc[ing] final tax judgments or unadjudicated tax claims of other sovereigns." The court found the revenue rule to be inapplicable because U.S. officials brought the prosecution, rather than Canadian officials. The court also reasoned that the revenue rule is inapplicable because Canadian tax laws were "incidental" to the enforcement of the wire fraud statute.

=== Dissents ===
Justice Ginsburg wrote the dissent, joined by Justice Breyer and in part by Justices Scalia and Souter. The dissent argued that the revenue rule does not allow for a prosecution that is essentially charging the violation of another country's revenue laws, and that the majority wrongly gives the federal wire fraud statute extraterritorial effect.

== See also ==
- Mail and wire fraud
- Common law revenue rule
- 2004 term opinions of the Supreme Court of the United States
- 2004 term United States Supreme Court opinions of Clarence Thomas
- 2004 term United States Supreme Court opinions of Ruth Bader Ginsburg
- List of United States Supreme Court cases, volume 544

== Sources ==
- Wallach, Brian (2006). "All Hands on Deck: Rescuing the Revenue Rule from the Supreme Court's Decision in Pasquantino". The Tax Lawyer. 59 (2): 621–647. JSTOR 20772623.
- Friedman, Jason S. (2006). "Whiskey and the Wires: The Inadvisable Application of the Wire Fraud Statute to Alcohol Smuggling and Foreign Tax Evasion". Journal of Criminal Law and Criminology. 96 (3). Archived from the original on September 12, 2015.
- Lowther, Todd (2006). "Pasquantino v. United States: The Supreme Court's Misstep in Prosecuting International Tax Fraud Under the Wire Fraud Statute – A Bruise and a Band-Aid" (PDF). The Houston Business and Tax Law Journal. VII (II). Archived from the original (PDF) on December 24, 2020.
- Guttman, Jaime (January 1, 2006). "Stopping the Bandidos: Pasquantino and the Prosecution of Tax Fraud in Latin America". Chicago-Kent Journal of International and Comparative Law. 6 (1). Archived from the original on December 24, 2020.
- Podgor, Ellen S. (2005). "A New Dimension to the Prosecution of White Collar Crime: Enforcing Extraterritorial Social Harms". McGeorge Law Review. 37 (1). SSRN 736945 – via SSRN.
