= List of United States Supreme Court cases, volume 545 =

This is a list of all the United States Supreme Court cases from volume 545 of the United States Reports:

Case name	Citation	Date decided
Gonzales v. Raich	545 U.S. 1	2005
Alaska v. United States	545 U.S. 75	2005
Spector v. Norwegian Cruise Line Ltd.	545 U.S. 119	2005
Johnson v. California	545 U.S. 162	2005
A defendant satisfies the first step of Batson v. Kentucky by producing evidence sufficient to permit the trial judge to draw an inference that discrimination has occurred, and a state cannot adopt a "more likely than not" standard for this step.
Bradshaw v. Stumpf	545 U.S. 175	2005
Merck KGaA v. Integra Lifesciences I, Ltd.	545 U.S. 193	2005
Wilkinson v. Austin	545 U.S. 209	2005
Miller-El v. Dretke	545 U.S. 231	2005
Grable & Sons Metal Products, Inc. v. Darue Eng'g & Mfg.	545 U.S. 308	2005
San Remo Hotel, L.P. v. City of San Francisco	545 U.S. 323	2005
Dodd v. United States	545 U.S. 353	2005
Rompilla v. Beard	545 U.S. 374	2005
Graham Cnty. Soil & Water Conservation Dist. v. United States ex rel. Wilson	545 U.S. 409	2005
American Trucking Ass'ns., Inc. v. Mich. Pub. Serv. Comm'n	545 U.S. 429	2005
Mid-Con Freight Systems, Inc. v. Mich. Pub. Serv. Comm'n	545 U.S. 440	2005
Kelo v. City of New London	545 U.S. 469	2005
Gonzalez v. Crosby	545 U.S. 524	2005
Exxon Mobil Corp. v. Allapattah Services, Inc.	545 U.S. 546	2005
Orff v. United States	545 U.S. 596	2005
Reclaimation Reform Act Section 390uu does not waive the United States’ sovereign immunity from petitioners’ suit.
Halbert v. Michigan	545 U.S. 605	2005
Mayle v. Felix	545 U.S. 644	2005
An amended habeas petition does not relate back (and thereby avoid AEDPA’s one-year time limit) when it asserts a new ground for relief supported by facts that differ in both time and type from those set forth in the original pleading.
Van Orden v. Perry	545 U.S. 677	2005
Castle Rock v. Gonzales	545 U.S. 748	2005
Bell v. Thompson	545 U.S. 794	2005
McCreary Cnty. v. ACLU	545 U.S. 844	2005
Metro-Goldwyn-Mayer Studios Inc. v. Grokster, Ltd.	545 U.S. 913	2005
Nat'l Cable & Telecommunications Ass'n v. Brand X Internet Services	545 U.S. 967	2005
