= John Wetzel (Pennsylvania official) =

American politician

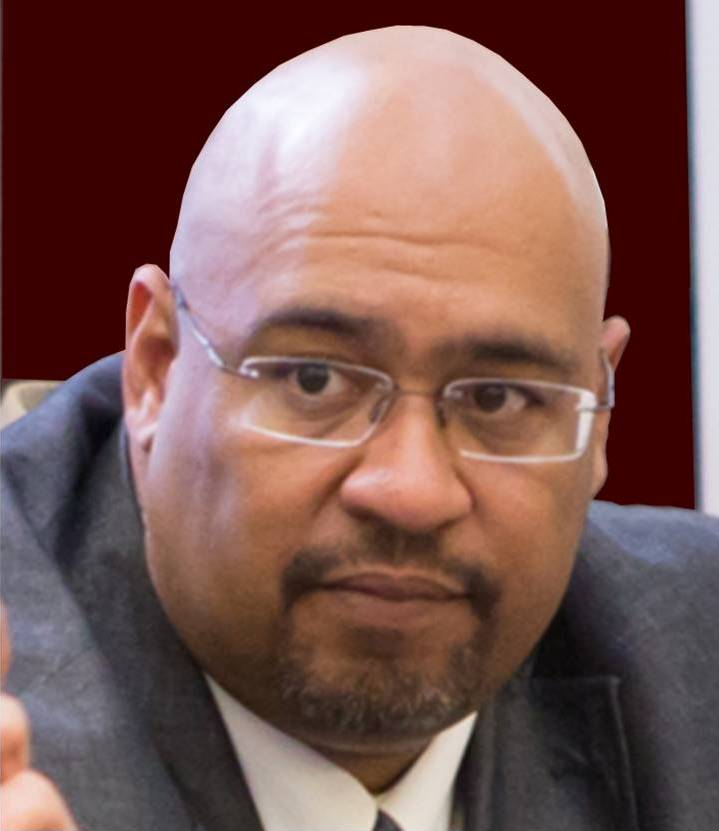

Secretary of Corrections of Pennsylvania
- In office May 3, 2011 – October 1, 2021
- Governor: Tom Corbett; Tom Wolf
- Preceded by: Jeffrey A. Beard
- Succeeded by: George Little

Personal details
- Party: Republican
- Education: Bloomsburg University of Pennsylvania
- Occupation: Secretary of Corrections

John Edward Wetzel served as Pennsylvania Secretary of Corrections from 2011 until 2021, after being nominated by Pennsylvania Governor Tom Corbett and confirmed in May 2011. He was subsequently re-nominated by Governor Tom Wolf in 2015. Wetzel resigned his office effective October 1, 2021. Previously, he served on the Pennsylvania Board of Pardons.

Wetzel is also chair of the Board of Directors for The Council of State Governments Justice Center, a national nonprofit that provides practical, nonpartisan, research-driven strategies and tools to increase public safety and strengthen communities.
