= Bell v. Cone =

- Supreme Court of the United States

Argued March 25, 2002 Decided May 28, 2002
- Full case name: Ricky Bell, Warden v. Gary Bradford Cone
- Docket no.: 01-400
- Citations: 535 U.S. 685 (more) 122 S. Ct. 1843; 152 L. Ed. 2d 914
- Argument: Oral argument

Case history
- Prior: Cone v. Bell, 956 F. Supp. 1401 (W.D. Tenn. 1997); affirmed in part, reversed in part, 243 F.3d 961 (6th Cir. 2001); cert. granted, 534 U.S. 1064 (2001).
- Subsequent: Cone v. Bell, 359 F.3d 785 (6th Cir. 2004), reversed and remanded by Bell v. Cone, 543 U.S. 447 (2005) (per curiam); Cone v. Bell, 492 F.3d 743 (6th Cir. 2007), vacated by Cone v. Bell, 556 U.S. 449, 463 (2009).

Holding
- Tennessee state courts did not unreasonably apply clearly established law when determining whether the defendant in this case was denied effective assistance of counsel

Court membership
- Chief Justice William Rehnquist Associate Justices John P. Stevens · Sandra Day O'Connor; Antonin Scalia · Anthony Kennedy; David Souter · Clarence Thomas; Ruth Bader Ginsburg · Stephen Breyer

Case opinions
- Majority: Rehnquist, joined by O'Connor, Scalia, Kennedy, Souter, Thomas, Ginsburg, Breyer
- Dissent: Stevens

Laws applied
- Antiterrorism and Effective Death Penalty Act of 1996, 28 U.S.C. § 2254(d)

Bell v. Cone, 535 U.S. 685 (2002), was a Supreme Court of the United States case that upheld a death sentence despite the defendant's argument that he should not be sentenced to death because he was suffering from drug-induced psychosis when he committed the crimes. Cone also argued that he was denied effective assistance of counsel because his attorney failed to present sufficient mitigating evidence during the sentencing phase of his trial and that his attorney inappropriately waived his final argument during the sentencing phase. In an 8–1 opinion written by Chief Justice William Rehnquist, the United States Supreme Court denied Cone's petition for a writ of habeas corpus. The Court held that the actions taken by Cone's attorney during the sentencing phase were "tactical decisions" and that the state courts that denied Cone's appeals did not unreasonably apply clearly established law. Justice John Paul Stevens wrote a dissenting opinion in which he argued that Cone was denied effective assistance of counsel because his attorney failed to "subject the prosecution's case to meaningful adversarial testing."

Commentators have noted that Bell v. Cone is significant because it clarified the standards that should be used when determining ineffective assistance of counsel claims. Other commentators have suggested that the Court's ruling has made it more difficult for state prisoners to receive habeas relief in federal court. After several additional appeals, the United States Supreme Court ruled in Cone v. Bell (2009) that Cone should receive a new hearing in federal trial court to determine whether the prosecution's failure to disclose evidence violated Cone's rights to due process under Brady v. Maryland. In 2016, Gary Cone died from natural causes while still sitting on Tennessee's death row.

== Background ==
In 1982, Gary Cone was convicted and sentenced to death for a crime spree that included the robbery of a jewelry store, a police pursuit, and the murder of an elderly couple. At trial, Cone's attorney argued that he was not guilty by reason of insanity, and several experts testified that Cone suffered from a long history of drug abuse and post traumatic stress disorder resulting from his military service during the Vietnam War. According to one expert, Cone's long-term drug abuse caused hallucinations and paranoia that "affected respondent's mental capacity and ability to obey the law." The jury rejected Cone's insanity defense and found him guilty on all counts. At a sentencing hearing, Cone's attorney did not present evidence of Cone's drug use as mitigating evidence. Cone's attorney also waived his final argument so that the prosecutors would not have an opportunity for a rebuttal argument. The trial court ultimately sentenced Cone to death, and on appeal, the Tennessee Supreme Court affirmed Cone's convictions and sentence.

=== Petitions for postconviction relief ===
Cone later filed a petition for postconviction relief, in which he argued that his attorney provided ineffective assistance of counsel by waiving his closing argument and by failing to present mitigating evidence during the sentencing phase of his trial. After conducting a hearing on Cone's petition, a Tennessee state court rejected Cone's contentions, and the Tennessee Court of Criminal Appeals affirmed the lower court's ruling. The Tennessee Court of Criminal Appeals concluded that Cone's attorney acted within an acceptable range of competency and that Cone "received the death penalty based on the law and facts, not on the shortcomings of counsel." Both the Tennessee Supreme Court and the United States Supreme Court declined to consider further appeals.

In 1997, Cone filed a petition for a writ of habeas corpus in federal court. In his petition, he alleged that his attorney provided ineffective assistance of counsel during the sentencing phase of his trial, but the federal district court denied his petition. On appeal, the United States Court of Appeals for the Sixth Circuit affirmed the district court's ruling with respect to Cone's conviction, but it revered the district court's ruling with respect to Cone's sentence. The Sixth Circuit held that Cone "suffered a Sixth Amendment violation for which prejudice should be presumed" because his attorney's failure to ask for mercy "did not subject the State's call for the death penalty to meaningful adversarial testing." Additionally, the Sixth Circuit held that the Tennessee Court of Criminal Appeals decision constituted "an unreasonable application of the clearly established law". In 2001, the United States Supreme Court granted certiorari.

== Opinion of the Court ==
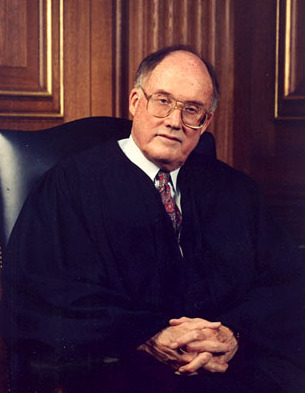
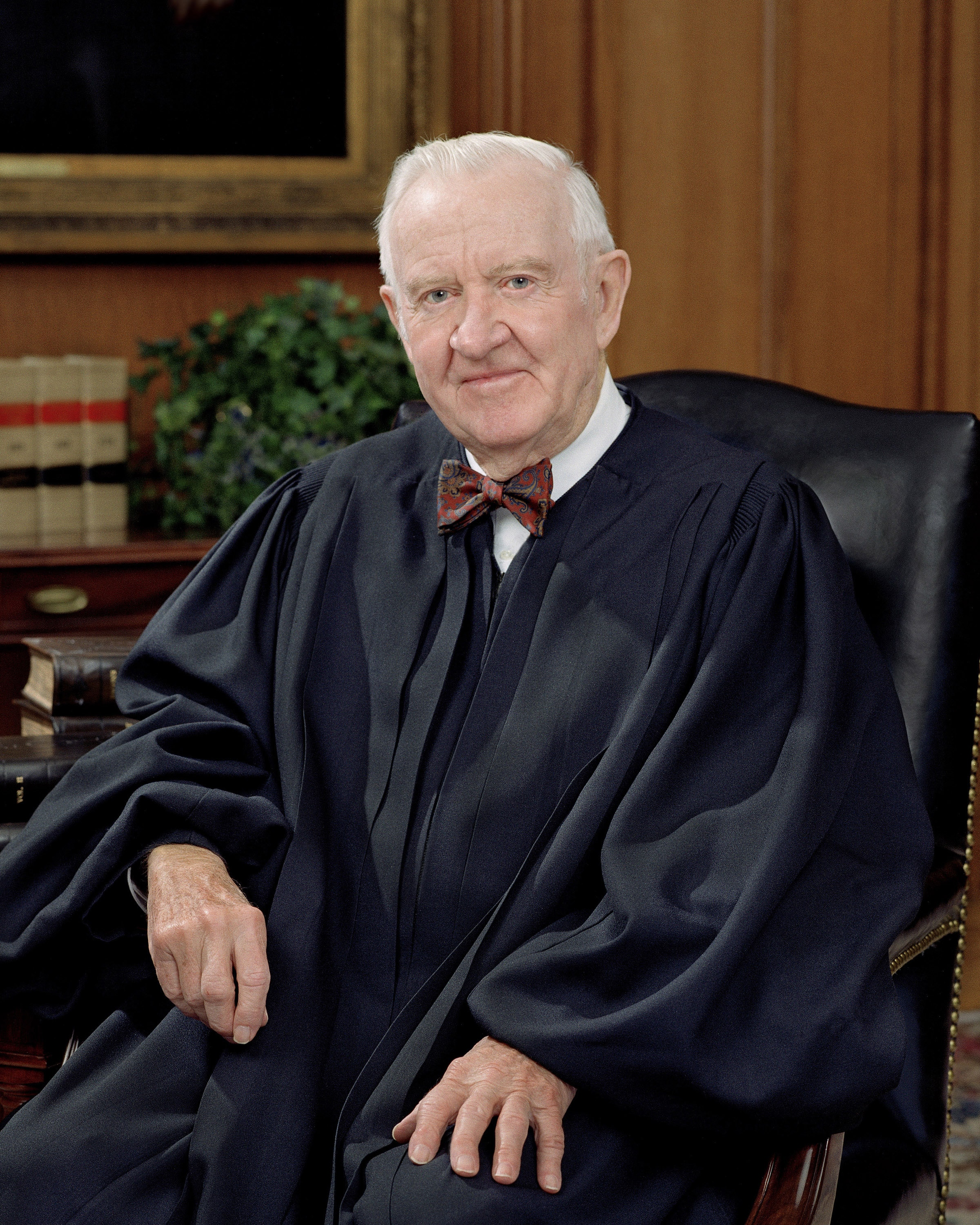
Chief Justice William Rehnquist (pictured left) described Cone's attorney's actions as "tactical decision about which competent lawyers might disagree", while Justice John Paul Stevens (pictured right) noted that experts described the attorney's actions as "highly abnormal, and perhaps unprecedented in a capital case."

In an opinion written by Chief Justice William Rehnquist, the Supreme Court reversed the Sixth Circuit's ruling and remanded the case to the Sixth Circuit for further proceedings. Chief Justice Rehnquist stated that the Tennessee state court correctly identified Strickland v. Washington's two-part test as the proper legal standard for effective assistance of counsel when it rejected Cone's petition for postconviction relief. Under this standard, Cone would need to demonstrate that his attorney's "representation fell below an objective standard of reasonableness" and that "there is a reasonable probability that, but for counsel's unprofessional errors, the result of the proceeding would have been different". Additionally, Chief Justice Rehnquist wrote that in order to presume prejudice under the standards set forth in United States v. Cronic, an attorney's failure to subject a case to adversarial scrutiny "must be complete." Chief Justice Rehnquist wrote that Cone would also need to demonstrate that the Tennessee court "applied Strickland to the facts of his case in an objectively unreasonable manner", but he was unable to do so in this case. Citing various "tactical reasons" why Cone's attorney did not present mitigating evidence, Chief Justice Rehnquist concluded that the jury still had an opportunity to consider whether "evidence of a mental disease or defect" should mitigate Cone's ultimate sentence. Finally, Chief Justice Rehnquist wrote that the attorney's choice to waive his closing argument was a "tactical decision about which competent lawyers might disagree."

=== Justice Stevens' dissenting opinion ===
Justice John Paul Stevens wrote a dissenting opinion in which he argued that Cone's attorney "entirely fail[ed] to subject the prosecution's case to meaningful adversarial testing." Justice Stevens argued that the attorney's decision to not present mitigating evidence relied upon the incorrect assumption that the jury already had sufficient information regarding mitigating factors. Additionally, Justice Stevens argued that the jury would have viewed the absence of a closing argument as a "concession that no case for life could be made." Justice Stevens also noted that expert witnesses who testified at Cone's postconviction hearings described Cone's attorney's actions as "highly abnormal, and perhaps unprecedented in a capital case." In light of these facts, Justice Stevens argued that the Court should presume that Cone suffered a violation of his Sixth Amendment rights.

== Subsequent developments ==
On remand, the Sixth Circuit ordered a new sentencing hearing "based on the purported invalidity of an aggravating circumstance found by the jury." In a per curiam opinion, Bell v. Cone (2005), the United States Supreme Court again reversed the Sixth Circuit's decision. The case then returned to the Sixth Circuit for a third time. In a 2007 opinion, the Sixth Circuit reconsidered whether the prosecution violated Cone's rights to due process under the Fourteenth Amendment by withholding police reports and witness statements that potentially could have corroborated his claims about the effects of his drug use. The Sixth Circuit rejected Cone's claims, holding the due process claims were procedurally barred by the Tennessee state courts in prior proceedings. The Sixth Circuit noted that even if the police reports and witness statements were admitted, they would not outweigh "overwhelming evidence of Cone’s guilt in committing a brutal double murder and the persuasive testimony that Cone was not under the influence of drugs."

The United States Supreme Court granted certiorari and vacated the Sixth Circuit's 2007 ruling. In an opinion written by Justice John Paul Stevens in Cone v. Bell (2009), the Supreme Court held that Cone's due process claims should not have been procedurally barred, and the Supreme Court remanded the case to the United States District Court that first examined Cone's habeas petition, "with instructions to give full consideration to the merits of Cone’s [due process] claim." Justice Stevens noted that "the quantity and the quality of the suppressed evidence lends support to Cone’s position at trial that he habitually used excessive amounts of drugs, that his addiction affected his behavior during his crime spree, and that the State’s arguments to the contrary were false and misleading." On April 19, 2016, Gary Cone died of natural causes while still sitting on Tennessee's death row.

== Analysis and commentary ==
Justin Rand noted that Bell v. Cone is significant because it clarified that prejudice will only be presumed in the three circumstances outlined in United States v. Cronic and that all other cases will be analyzed under Strickland v. Washington's standards for evaluating prejudice. However, Jennifer Williams suggested that the Court's ruling intended to limit presumptions of prejudice to cases in which there is a "complete" failure to challenge the prosecution. David A. Moran wrote that the Court's ruling in Bell reaffirmed that "the Cronic rule should apply to absences of counsel from critical stages of a criminal trial." Robert J. Nolan suggested that an "appropriate" interpretation of the Court's ruling would allow judges to presume prejudice for "unauthorized concessions" made during opening arguments because Supreme Court precedent requires that defense counsel "engage in meaningful adversarial testing."

In his review of the case for the Suffolk University Law Review, Marc L. Gouthro, wrote that the Supreme Court "correctly" and "accurately" applied existing law to the facts of the case; he also suggested that the Court's ruling "provided concrete guidance for the lower courts to follow when making future decisions." However, in his analysis of the case for the Mercer Law Review, Stuart E. Walker suggested that the Court's narrow interpretation of standards for federal habeas relief presents a "formidable barrier" to habeas petitioners and, "[g]iven the Supreme Court’s decision in Bell v. Cone, many state prisoners seeking federal habeas relief for ineffective assistance claims may face a dim future." Wayne M. Helge also wrote that "viewed in light of Strickland's presumption of reasonable professional conduct by counsel," the Supreme Court's ruling will ultimately make "state court holdings practically unchallengeable on the merits."

== See also ==
- List of United States Supreme Court cases
- Lists of United States Supreme Court cases by volume
- List of United States Supreme Court cases by the Rehnquist Court
