= Dura Pharmaceuticals, Inc. v. Broudo =

- Supreme Court of the United States

Argued January 12, 2005 Decided April 19, 2005
- Full case name: Dura Pharmaceuticals, Inc., et al. v. Broudo et al.
- Citations: 544 U.S. 336 (more) 125 S. Ct. 1627; 161 L. Ed. 2d 577; 2005 U.S. LEXIS 3478

Case history
- Prior: 339 F.3d 933 (9th Cir. 2003)

Holding
- An inflated purchase price will not by itself constitute or proximately cause the relevant economic loss needed to allege and prove "loss causation."

Court membership
- Chief Justice William Rehnquist Associate Justices John P. Stevens · Sandra Day O'Connor; Antonin Scalia · Anthony Kennedy; David Souter · Clarence Thomas; Ruth Bader Ginsburg · Stephen Breyer

Case opinion
- Majority: Breyer, joined by unanimous

Laws applied
- 109 Stat. 747, 15 U.S.C. §78u-4(b)(4)

Dura Pharmaceuticals, Inc. v. Broudo, 544 U.S. 336 (2005), is a securities fraud decision by the Supreme Court of the United States, holding that an inflated purchase price will not by itself constitute or proximately cause the relevant economic loss needed to allege and prove "loss causation."

== Background ==
=== Facts ===
Respondents are individuals who bought stock in Dura Pharmaceuticals, on the public securities market between April 15, 1997, and February 24, 1998.

=== Procedural history ===
The District Court dismissed the complaint. In respect to the plaintiffs' drug-profitability claim, it held that the complaint failed adequately to allege an appropriate state of mind, i.e., that defendants had acted knowingly, or the like. In respect to the plaintiffs' spray device claim, it held that the complaint failed adequately to allege "loss causation."

The Court of Appeals for the Ninth Circuit reversed. In the portion of the court's decision now before us—the portion that concerns the spray device claim—the Circuit held that the complaint adequately alleged "loss causation." The Circuit wrote that "plaintiffs establish loss causation if they have shown that the price on the date of purchase was inflated because of the misrepresentation." 339 F. 3d, at 938 (emphasis in original; internal quotation marks omitted). It added that "the injury occurs at the time of the transaction." Ibid. Since the complaint pleaded "that the price at the time of purchase was overstated," and it sufficiently identified the cause, its allegations were legally sufficient. Ibid.

Because the Ninth Circuit's views about loss causation differ from those of other Circuits that have considered this issue, we granted Dura's petition for certiorari.
