= Jackson v. Birmingham Board of Education =

- Supreme Court of the United States

Argued November 30, 2004 Decided March 29, 2005
- Full case name: Roderick Jackson v. Birmingham Board of Education
- Docket no.: 02-1672
- Citations: 544 U.S. 167 (more) 125 S. Ct. 1497; 161 L. Ed. 2d 361

Case history
- Prior: Jackson v. Birmingham Bd. of Educ., 309 F.3d 1333 (11th Cir. 2002); cert. granted, 542 U.S. 903 (2004).
- Subsequent: Jackson v. Birmingham Bd. of Educ., 416 F.3d 1280 (11th Cir. 2005)

Holding
- Retaliation against a person because that person has complained of sex discrimination is a form of intentional sex discrimination encompassed by Title IX's private right of action

Court membership
- Chief Justice William Rehnquist Associate Justices John P. Stevens · Sandra Day O'Connor; Antonin Scalia · Anthony Kennedy; David Souter · Clarence Thomas; Ruth Bader Ginsburg · Stephen Breyer

Case opinions
- Majority: O'Connor, joined by Stevens, Souter, Ginsburg, Breyer
- Dissent: Thomas, joined by Rehnquist, Scalia, Kennedy

Laws applied
- Title IX, 20 U.S.C. § 1681(a).

Jackson v. Birmingham Board of Education, 544 U.S. 167 (2005), is a case in which the United States Supreme Court held that retaliation against a person because that person has complained of sex discrimination is a form of intentional sex discrimination encompassed by Title IX.

== Background ==
Roderick Jackson, a teacher in the Birmingham, Alabama, public school system, brought suit against the Birmingham Board of Education alleging that the board retaliated against him because he complained about sex discrimination at Ensley High School. Jackson, who had taught for six years prior in the Birmingham school district, was transferred to Ensley High School in August 1999 as a physical education teacher and girls' basketball coach. Jackson discovered that Ensley High School did not provide equal funding and access to athletic equipment and facilities for the girls' teams. In December 2000, Jackson began complaining of the unequal treatment, and began receiving negative evaluations. Jackson was removed as the girls' basketball coach in May 2001.

The United States District Court for the Northern District of Alabama dismissed Jackson's claims on the grounds that Title IX's private right of action does not include claims of retaliation. The Court of Appeals for the Eleventh Circuit affirmed the district court holding that Title IX does not provide a private right of action for retaliation.

== Opinion of the Court ==
Justice Sandra Day O'Connor writing for a 5-4 majority held that retaliation against individuals because they complain of sex discrimination is intentional conduct that violates the terms of Title IX. O'Connor analogized the case to Sullivan v. Little Hunting Park, Inc., which held that 42 U.S.C. § 1982 provided a cause of action for retaliation for advocacy for African Americans. Because Sullivan interpreted a general prohibition on racial discrimination to cover retaliation against those who advocate the rights of groups protected by that prohibition, so too should Title IX be read to prohibit retaliation for advocacy on behalf of those subjected to sex discrimination.

== Dissent ==
Justice Clarence Thomas authored a dissent joined by Chief Justice Rehnquist, Justice Scalia, and Justice Kennedy. Thomas argued that retaliatory conduct is not discrimination on the basis of sex under the plain terms of Title IX.

== See also ==
- List of United States Supreme Court cases, volume 544
- List of United States Supreme Court cases
