= List of United States Supreme Court cases, volume 544 =

This is a list of all the United States Supreme Court cases from volume 544 of the United States Reports:

Case name	Citation	Date decided
Tenet v. Doe	544 U.S. 1	2005
Shepard v. United States	544 U.S. 13	2005
Ballard v. Comm'r	544 U.S. 40	2005
The Tax Court may not exclude from the record on appeal Rule 183(b) reports submitted by special trial judges. No statute authorizes, and Rule 183’s current text does not warrant, the concealment at issue.
Wilkinson v. Dotson	544 U.S. 74	2005
A person incarcerated in state prison may bring a §1983 action for declaratory and injunctive relief challenging the constitutionality of state parole procedures; they need not seek relief exclusively under the federal habeas corpus statutes.
Muehler v. Mena	544 U.S. 93	2005
Rancho Palos Verdes v. Abrams	544 U.S. 113	2005
Brown v. Payton	544 U.S. 133	2005
Jackson v. Birmingham Bd. of Educ.	544 U.S. 167	2005
Title IX's private right of action encompasses claims of retaliation against a person because they have complained about sex discrimination.
City of Sherrill v. Oneida Indian Nation	544 U.S. 197	2005
Smith v. City of Jackson	544 U.S. 228	2005
Rhines v. Weber	544 U.S. 269	2005
A district court has discretion to stay a mixed petition to allow a petitioner to present his unexhausted claims to the state court in the first instance and then to return to federal court for review of his perfected petition.
Exxon Mobil Corp. v. Saudi Basic Industries Corp.	544 U.S. 280	2005
Johnson v. United States	544 U.S. 295	2005
When an incarcerated person collaterally attacks their federal sentence on the ground that a state conviction used to enhance that sentence has since been vacated, the 1-year limitations period begins to run when the petitioner receives notice of the order vacating the prior conviction. However, the petitioner must seek relief with due diligence in state court after entry of judgment in the federal case in which the sentence was enhanced.
Rousey v. Jacoway	544 U.S. 320	2005
Dura Pharmaceuticals, Inc. v. Broudo	544 U.S. 336	2005
Pasquantino v. United States	544 U.S. 349	2005
Small v. United States	544 U.S. 385	2005
Pace v. DiGuglielmo	544 U.S. 408	2005
Bates v. Dow Agrosciences LLC	544 U.S. 431	2005
Granholm v. Heald	544 U.S. 460	2005
Lingle v. Chevron U.S.A. Inc.	544 U.S. 528	2005
Johanns v. Livestock Marketing Ass'n	544 U.S. 550	2005
Clingman v. Beaver	544 U.S. 581	2005
Deck v. Missouri	544 U.S. 622	2005
Medellín v. Dretke	544 U.S. 660	2005
Arthur Andersen LLP v. United States	544 U.S. 696	2005
Cutter v. Wilkinson	544 U.S. 709	2005
Tory v. Cochran	544 U.S. 734	2005
