= Jeffrey A. Beard =

American politician

Secretary of Corrections and Rehabilitation of California
- In office December 2012 – January 2016
- Governor: Jerry Brown
- Preceded by: Martin Hoshino (Acting)
- Succeeded by: Scott Kernan

Secretary of Corrections of Pennsylvania
- In office 2003 – January 18, 2011
- Governor: Ed Rendell
- Succeeded by: John Wetzel

Jeffrey A. Beard is a retired prison official. Beard served as Secretary of the California Department of Corrections and Rehabilitation from December, 2012 to January, 2016. He previously served as Secretary of the Pennsylvania Department of Corrections, from 2001 until 2010.

Beard first started working in corrections in Pennsylvania in 1972.
