= Halbert v. Michigan =

- Supreme Court of the United States

Argued April 25, 2005 Decided June 23, 2005
- Full case name: Antonio Dwayne Halbert v. Michigan
- Citations: 545 U.S. 605 (more) 125 S. Ct. 2582; 162 L. Ed. 2d 552

Holding
- A Michigan law denying an appeals public defender to those who have pleaded guilty violated rights to due process and equal protection

Court membership
- Chief Justice William Rehnquist Associate Justices John P. Stevens · Sandra Day O'Connor; Antonin Scalia · Anthony Kennedy; David Souter · Clarence Thomas; Ruth Bader Ginsburg · Stephen Breyer

Case opinions
- Majority: Ginsburg, joined by Stevens, O'Connor, Kennedy, Souter, Breyer
- Dissent: Thomas, joined by Rehnquist, Scalia

Laws applied
- U.S. Const. amend. XIV

Halbert v. Michigan, 545 U.S. 605 (2005), was a case in which the Supreme Court of the United States held that a Michigan law (Mich. Comp. Laws Ann. § 770.3a (West 2000)), which denied public counsel for defendants appealing a conviction on a plea, violated the equal protection and due process clauses of the Fourteenth Amendment to the United States Constitution. In a majority opinion written by Justice Ruth Bader Ginsburg, the Court affirmed that "a State is required to appoint counsel for an indigent defendant's first-tier appeal as of right."

== See also ==
- List of United States Supreme Court cases, volume 545
- List of United States Supreme Court cases
