= Small v. United States =

- Supreme Court of the United States

Argued November 3, 2004 Decided April 26, 2005
- Full case name: Gary Sherwood Small, Petitioner v. United States
- Citations: 544 U.S. 385 (more) 125 S. Ct. 1752; 161 L. Ed. 2d 651; 2005 U.S. LEXIS 3700; 73 U.S.L.W. 4298; 18 Fla. L. Weekly Fed. S 245

Case history
- Prior: Defendant convicted, 183 F. Supp. 2d 755 (W.D. Pa. 2002); affirmed, 333 F.3d 425 (3d Cir. 2003); cert. granted, 541 U.S. 948 (2004).

Questions presented
- Whether the term "convicted in any court" contained in 18 U.S.C. § 922(g)(1) includes convictions entered in foreign courts.

Holding
- Section 922(g)(1)’s phrase “convicted in any court” encompasses only domestic, not foreign, convictions.

Court membership
- Chief Justice William Rehnquist Associate Justices John P. Stevens · Sandra Day O'Connor; Antonin Scalia · Anthony Kennedy; David Souter · Clarence Thomas; Ruth Bader Ginsburg · Stephen Breyer

Case opinions
- Majority: Breyer, joined by Stevens, O'Connor, Souter, Ginsburg
- Dissent: Thomas, joined by Scalia, Kennedy
- Rehnquist took no part in the consideration or decision of the case.

Laws applied
- 18 U.S.C. § 922(g)(1)

Small v. United States, 544 U.S. 385 (2005), was a decision by the Supreme Court of the United States involving 18 U.S.C. § 922(g)(1), which makes it illegal to possess a firearm for individuals previously "convicted in any court" of crimes for which they could have been sentenced to more than one year in prison. The Court ruled, in a five to three decision, that "any court" does not include those in foreign countries. This decision resolved a circuit split on the issue, and reversed the lower ruling of the Third Circuit that the law did apply to foreign convictions.

== Background ==
In December 1992, Gary Sherwood Small was arrested for an apparent (and disputed) attempt to recover a water heater from Naha Airport in Okinawa, Japan. According to Japanese authorities, the water heater contained several pistols, a rifle, and ammunition. Small was convicted on 17 April 1994 by a Japanese court for violating the Japanese Act Controlling the Possession of Firearms and Swords, the Gunpowder Control Act, and the Customs Act, all of which were felonies (that is, offenses punishable by a term of imprisonment exceeding one year). Small was sentenced to five years in a Japanese prison, but was paroled in November 1996. His parole ended on 26 May 1998.

On 2 June 1998, shortly after his Japanese parole ended, Small purchased a handgun from the Delmont Sport Shop, a firearms dealer in the community where he resided. During the purchase process, Small filled out a form required by the Bureau of Alcohol, Tobacco, Firearms, and Explosives (ATF). One of the questions on the form was "Have you ever been convicted in any court of a crime for which the judge could have imprisoned you for more than one year, even if the judge actually gave you a shorter sentence?" Small answered "no" to this question.

In 2000, during a routine check of gun purchases from firearms dealers, the ATF discovered that Small, who had served a prison sentence in Japan, had purchased a handgun in Pennsylvania. When they searched his apartment they found another gun and ammunition. According to the government, because Small had been convicted in Japan in 1994, when he purchased the handgun at the Delmont Sport Shop he violated Title 18 United States Code § 922(g)(1), which makes it unlawful:

(g) . . . for any person

(1) who has been convicted in any court of a crime punishable by imprisonment for a term exceeding one year: . . .

to possess in or affecting commerce, any firearm.

== Prior legal history ==
=== District Court ===
On 30 August 2000, a federal grand jury in the United States District Court for the Western District of Pennsylvania indicted Small on four counts:

- one count of making a false statement to a federally licensed firearms dealer;
- one count of possession of ammunition by a convicted felon; and
- two counts of possession of a firearm by a convicted felon.

Upon his indictment, Small filed to have the case dismissed, arguing that foreign convictions should not count as a predicate offense under Section 922 because the statement "any court" within the statute was meant for U.S. convictions only. The district court denied the motion.

Small also argued that his Japanese offense should not count because he did not receive certain basic civil rights protections during his trial in Japan. Small requested that the district court hold an evidentiary hearing so that he could testify about the fairness of his conviction in Japan. The government responded that there was no need for an evidentiary hearing because Section 922 addresses the fact of a prior conviction, not the fairness of it. On 16 January 2002, the district court denied the motion because the Japanese Constitution protects similar rights guaranteed by the United States Constitution. (Small argued that, while the same rights are protected in theory, in practice they are abused, citing several specific instances of incidents that would be considered violations of rights protected under the Fourth Amendment and Fifth Amendment of the United States Constitution.)

On 14 March 2002, Small conditionally pleaded guilty to one count of possession of a firearm by a convicted felon, for which he was sentenced to eight months in jail and three years of supervised release. However, he remains free on bail pending the outcome of his appeals.

=== Court of Appeals ===
Small appealed the district court's opinion to the United States Court of Appeals for the Third Circuit. The appeals court upheld the district court's ruling in a relatively short opinion, stating that the district court properly determined the fairness of the Japanese court's proceedings as well as the opinion that "any court" applies to both foreign and domestic courts.

The appeals court did not acknowledge in its opinion a split among circuit courts. In the past 18 years, there have been four other cases on the same question. In the 1980s, the Fourth and Sixth Circuits held that foreign convictions could serve as predicate offenses under Section 922. More recently, the Tenth and Second Circuits have ruled that the term "any court" refers only to U.S. courts.

Following the opinion, Small filed for an en banc hearing of the case, which was denied.

== Supreme Court ==
On 17 November 2003, Small filed a Petition for Certiorari to the Supreme Court of the United States. The government did not oppose, citing an interest in "being able to apply a uniform national rule in regulating or giving advice to persons with foreign convictions who seek to become licensed firearm importers, manufacturers, or dealers, or who seek to possess firearms." On 29 March 2004, the Court granted Certiorari, agreeing to hear the case.

Oral arguments were presented on 3 November 2004. The Supreme court ruled on April 26, 2005, in favor of Small, in a decision written by Justice Breyer, joined by Justices Stevens, O'Connor, Souter and Ginsburg. Justice Thomas, joined by Justices Scalia and Kennedy dissented. The majority opinion emphasised anomalies resulting from a reading of "any court" to include foreign courts. The dissent insisted on a literal interpretation of the word "any" and argued that applying the law to foreign convictions was not irrational enough to rebut the usual meaning of the word "any".

== Possible ancillary effects ==
One interesting aspect of this case is the potential to affect a minor section of the USA PATRIOT Act. As the government notes in its response to the request for Certiorari:

Finally, Congress's recent enactment of other legislation that predicates criminal liability on convictions entered "in any court" suggests that definitive guidance by this Court would be of value at this time. See 18 U.S.C. 175b(d)(2)(B) (prohibition on possession of biological weapons), added by Uniting and Strengthening America by Providing Appropriate Tools Required to Intercept and Obstruct Terrorism Act of 2001, Pub. L. No. 107-56, Title VIII, § 817(2), 115 Stat. 386 (Oct. 26, 2001).7

== Related cases ==
- United States v. Winson (1986)
- United States v. Atkins (1989)
- United States v. Concha (2000)
- United States v. Gayle (2003)

== See also ==
- List of United States Supreme Court cases, volume 544
- List of United States Supreme Court cases
