= Tory v. Cochran =

- Supreme Court of the United States

Argued March 22, 2005 Decided May 31, 2005
- Full case name: Ulysses Tory, et al., Petitioners v. Johnnie L. Cochran, Jr.
- Citations: 544 U.S. 734 (more) 125 S. Ct. 2108; 161 L. Ed. 2d 1042; 2005 U.S. LEXIS 4347; 73 U.S.L.W. 4404; 33 Media L. Rep. 1737; 18 Fla. L. Weekly Fed. S 322

Case history
- Prior: On writ of certiorari to the Court of Appeal of California, Second Appellate District

Court membership
- Chief Justice William Rehnquist Associate Justices John P. Stevens · Sandra Day O'Connor; Antonin Scalia · Anthony Kennedy; David Souter · Clarence Thomas; Ruth Bader Ginsburg · Stephen Breyer

Case opinions
- Majority: Breyer, joined by Rehnquist, Stevens, O'Connor, Kennedy, Souter, Ginsburg
- Dissent: Thomas, joined by Scalia

Tory v. Cochran, 544 U.S. 734 (2005), is a United States Supreme Court case involving libel.

== Background ==
The case began in California with Johnnie Cochran, the attorney who represented O. J. Simpson, suing his former client Ulysses Tory for libel and invasion of privacy. Cochran had withdrawn as Tory's lawyer in a civil rights suit nearly twenty years earlier, and in the late 1990s Tory began picketing Cochran's office, carrying signs that accused him of being a thief and of accepting bribes. A trial judge ruled that Tory had made false and defamatory statements about Cochran, and instead of awarding him damages, issued an injunction ordering Tory to never again display a sign or speak about Cochran.

Tory appealed, arguing that the order was a prior restraint that violated his First Amendment right to free speech. In an unpublished opinion, the California Court of Appeals ruled that the order was constitutional. The California Supreme Court declined to review the case, and on April 24, 2004, Tory filed a petition for a writ of certiorari with the U.S. Supreme Court. The petition was granted, briefing followed, and the oral argument took place on March 22, 2005. Cochran died seven days later and the court asked for further briefing.

== Opinion of the Court ==
On May 31, 2005, the court ruled 7–2 that in light of Cochran's death, the injunction limiting the demonstrations of Ulysses Tory "amounts to an overly broad prior restraint upon speech". Two justices, Antonin Scalia and Clarence Thomas, said that Cochran's death made it unnecessary for the court to rule.

== See also ==
- List of United States Supreme Court cases, volume 544
- List of United States Supreme Court cases
- List of United States Supreme Court cases by the Rehnquist Court
- List of United States Supreme Court cases involving the First Amendment
