= Rompilla v. Beard =

- Supreme Court of the United States

Argued January 18, 2005 Decided June 20, 2005
- Full case name: Ronald Rompilla, Petitioner v. Jeffrey A. Beard, Secretary, Pennsylvania Department of Corrections
- Docket no.: 04-5462
- Citations: 545 U.S. 374 (more) 125 S. Ct. 2456, 162 L.Ed.2d 360
- Argument: Oral argument

Case history
- Prior: 355 F.3d 233 (CA3 2004)

Holding
- Even when a capital defendant and his family members have suggested that no mitigating evidence is available, his lawyer is bound to make reasonable efforts to obtain and review material that counsel knows the prosecution will probably rely on as evidence of aggravation at the trial’s sentencing phase. United States Court of Appeals for the Third Circuit reversed.

Court membership
- Chief Justice William Rehnquist Associate Justices John P. Stevens · Sandra Day O'Connor; Antonin Scalia · Anthony Kennedy; David Souter · Clarence Thomas; Ruth Bader Ginsburg · Stephen Breyer

Case opinions
- Majority: Souter, joined by Stevens, O'Connor, Ginsburg, Breyer
- Concurrence: O'Connor
- Dissent: Kennedy, joined by Rehnquist, Scalia, Thomas

Rompilla v. Beard, 545 U.S. 374 (2005), is a case decided by the Supreme Court of the United States on June 20, 2005. In a majority opinion authored by Justice David Souter, the Court held 5–4 that the petitioner, convicted murderer Ronald Rompilla, had received ineffective assistance of counsel due to his lawyer's failure to adequately investigate and obtain evidence that the lawyer knew the prosecution would likely use against the defendant. It therefore reversed the prior ruling to the contrary by the United States Court of Appeals for the Third Circuit, and overturned Rompilla's death sentence as a result. It was the third major case in five years in which the Supreme Court had invalidated a death sentence on the grounds that the defendant had received ineffective assistance of counsel. It was also one of the last cases heard by Justice Sandra Day O'Connor prior to her retirement from the Court in 2006. O'Connor joined the majority in this case, which attracted attention in part because the author of the Third Circuit decision that the Supreme Court overturned in this case was Judge Samuel Alito, who replaced O'Connor on the Supreme Court the following year.
