= Cutter v. Wilkinson =

- Supreme Court of the United States

Argued March 21, 2005 Decided May 31, 2005
- Full case name: Jon B. Cutter, et al. v. Reginald Wilkinson, Director, Ohio Department of Rehabilitation and Correction, et al.
- Citations: 544 U.S. 709 (more) 125 S. Ct. 2113; 161 L. Ed. 2d 1020; 2005 U.S. LEXIS 4346; 73 U.S.L.W. 4397; 18 Fla. L. Weekly Fed. S 317

Case history
- Prior: Defendants' motion to dismiss denied, Cutter v. Wilkinson, U.S. Dist. Ct. S.D. Ohio, Feb. 25, 2002; reversed and remanded, 349 F.3d 257 (6th Cir. 2003); rehearing denied, 2004 U.S. App. LEXIS 4294 (6th Cir., Mar. 3, 2004); cert. granted, 125 S. Ct. 308 (2004)
- Subsequent: District Court affirmed, 2005 U.S. App. LEXIS 19695 (6th Cir., Sept. 13, 2005)

Holding
- Section § 2000cc-1 of the Religious Land Use and Institutionalized Persons Act was not facially unconstitutional but was instead a permissible accommodation of religion under the First Amendment.

Court membership
- Chief Justice William Rehnquist Associate Justices John P. Stevens · Sandra Day O'Connor; Antonin Scalia · Anthony Kennedy; David Souter · Clarence Thomas; Ruth Bader Ginsburg · Stephen Breyer

Case opinions
- Majority: Ginsburg, joined by unanimous
- Concurrence: Thomas

Laws applied
- U.S. Const. amend. I; 42 U.S.C. § 2000cc-1 (Religious Land Use and Institutionalized Persons Act)

Cutter v. Wilkinson, 544 U.S. 709 (2005), was a United States Supreme Court case in which the Court held that, under the Religious Land Use and Institutionalized Persons Act (RLUIPA), facilities that accept federal funds cannot deny prisoners accommodations that are necessary to engage in activities for the practice of their own religious beliefs.

RLUIPA prohibited the federal government from imposing a substantial burden on prisoners' freedom of religion. Five residents of an Ohio prison, which included two adherents of Asatru, a minister of the white supremacist Church of Jesus Christ–Christian, a Wiccan and a Satanist filed suit. The men stated in federal district court that prison officials violated RLUIPA by failing to accommodate the inmates' exercise of their "nonmainstream" religions. Prison officials argued that the act "improperly advanced religion and thus violated the First Amendment's establishment clause which prohibited government from making laws "respecting an establishment of religion." The district court had originally rejected that argument and ruled for the inmates. The Sixth Circuit Court of Appeals had reversed the decision.

== Question presented ==
Did a federal law prohibiting government from burdening prisoners' religious exercise violate the First Amendment's establishment clause?

== Decision of the Court ==
The Court returned a unanimous opinion, written by Justice Ginsburg, with a concurring opinion by Justice Thomas. Ruling in favor of the inmates, the Court held that, on its face, RLUIPA made an accommodation allowed by the First Amendment. The Court noted that constitutional problems could arise if RLUIPA were "enforced improperly and religious prisoners received favored treatment, or if religious exercise and security concerns were not properly balanced."

== See also ==
- Religion in United States prisons
