= Kowalski v. Tesmer =

- Supreme Court of the United States

Decided December 13, 2004
- Full case name: Kowalski v. Tesmer
- Citations: 543 U.S. 125 (more)

Holding
- Attorneys lack third-party standing to assert the rights of indigent defendants denied their constitutional right to have appointed appellate counsel.

Court membership
- Chief Justice William Rehnquist Associate Justices John P. Stevens · Sandra Day O'Connor; Antonin Scalia · Anthony Kennedy; David Souter · Clarence Thomas; Ruth Bader Ginsburg · Stephen Breyer

Case opinions
- Majority: Rehnquist, joined by O'Connor, Scalia, Kennedy, Thomas, Breyer
- Concurrence: Thomas
- Dissent: Ginsburg, joined by Stevens, Souter

Kowalski v. Tesmer, 543 U.S. 125 (2004), was a United States Supreme Court case in which the court held that attorneys lack third-party standing to assert the rights of indigent defendants denied their constitutional right to have appointed appellate counsel.

== Background ==
After the Constitution of Michigan was amended to require that an appeal by an accused pleading guilty or nolo contendere be by leave of the court, several state judges denied appointed appellate counsel to indigents pleading guilty, and the Michigan Legislature subsequently codified this practice. Two attorneys, including Tesmer, joined three indigent criminal defendants in filing suit in federal District Court, alleging that the practice denies indigents their federal due process and equal protection rights. The District Court held the practice and statute unconstitutional, but a Sixth Circuit Court of Appeals panel reversed, holding that Younger v. Harris abstention barred the indigents' suit but that the attorneys had third-party standing to assert the indigents' rights; and that the statute was constitutional. On rehearing, the en banc Sixth Circuit agreed on standing but found the statute unconstitutional.

The Supreme Court granted certiorari.

== Opinion of the court ==
The Supreme Court issued an opinion on December 13, 2004.
