= Muehler v. Mena =

Darin L. Muehler and Robert Brill v. Iris Mena
- Supreme Court of the United States

Argued December 8, 2004 Decided March 22, 2005
- Full case name: Muehler v. Mena
- Docket no.: 03-1423
- Citations: 544 U.S. 93 (more) 125 S. Ct. 1465; 161 L. Ed. 2d 299

Case history
- Prior: Certiorari to the United States Court of Appeals for the Ninth Circuit

Holding
- Mena's detention did not violate the Fourth Amendment; the officers' questioning of Mena about her immigration status during her detention did not violate the Fourth Amendment.

Court membership
- Chief Justice William Rehnquist Associate Justices John P. Stevens · Sandra Day O'Connor; Antonin Scalia · Anthony Kennedy; David Souter · Clarence Thomas; Ruth Bader Ginsburg · Stephen Breyer

Case opinions
- Majority: Rehnquist, joined by O’Connor, Scalia, Kennedy, Thomas
- Concurrence: Kennedy
- Concurrence: Stevens, joined by Souter, Ginsburg, Breyer

Laws applied
- U.S. Const. amends. IV

Muehler v. Mena, 544 U.S. 93 (2005), was a unanimous decision by the United States Supreme Court, which held that the Fourth Amendment to the United States Constitution allows detention of an occupant in handcuffs while a search is being conducted, and that it does not require officers to have an independent reasonable suspicion before questioning a subject about their immigration status.

== Background ==
Police officers executed a warrant to search Iris Mena's house for deadly weapons and evidence of gang membership. Mena had rented a room in her house to a gang member who was a suspect in a drive-by shooting. At 7 a.m. on February 3, 1998, petitioners, along with the SWAT team and other officers, executed the warrant. Mena was asleep in her bed when the SWAT team, clad in helmets and black vests, entered her bedroom and placed her in handcuffs at gunpoint. The SWAT team also handcuffed three other individuals found on the property. Mena was then detained in her garage for two to three hours in handcuffs under the guard of two officers.

Mena brought a § 1983 suit against the officers, alleging that she was detained “for an unreasonable time and in an unreasonable manner” in violation of the Fourth Amendment. In addition, she claimed that the warrant and its execution were overbroad, that the officers failed to comply with the “knock and announce” rule, and that the officers had needlessly destroyed property during the search. After a trial, a jury found that Officers Muehler and Brill violated Mena's Fourth Amendment right to be free from unreasonable seizures by detaining her so long and awarded Mena $60,000 in actual and punitive damages. The U.S. Court of Appeals for the Ninth Circuit affirmed the verdict and the damages.

== Decision ==
The Supreme Court of the United States began its analysis by pointing out that "Mena's detention was, under Michigan v. Summers, plainly permissible." According to the Court, the fact that Mena was an occupant of the residence being searched was sufficient to justify her detention under Summers.

The Court went on to explain that "[i]nherent in Summers' authorization to detain an occupant of the place to be searched is the authority to use reasonable force to effectuate the detention." In this case, the Court said, the governmental interest in applying handcuffs to Mena—who was already being lawfully detained—outweighed the intrusion. The court noted that the governmental interests were particularly high because this was a search for weapons and a wanted gang member resided on the premises. The Court acknowledged that the duration of detention does impact the balancing, but held that the two-to-three hour detention in handcuffs did not outweigh the government's safety interest.

The Court's decision in Muehler v. Mena has been criticized by civil rights attorney (and future Federal Judge) Amir H. Ali, in his contribution to the Harvard Civil Rights Journal. Ali commented that the decision arguably represents a serious expansion of the personal intrusion that had been permitted in Michigan v. Summers. He went on to say that had the Court undergone a balancing of the totality of the circumstances, it would have been hard to justify the Mena's prolonged detention in handcuffs. In addition, the Muehler Court's one sentence justification—“this case involved the detention of four detainees by two officers during a search of a gang house for dangerous weapons”—set the bar remarkably low. Ali also emphasized, "the Court did not address the fact that, although two officers were on guard, there were actually eighteen officers on the scene, or the concurring Justices' observation that 'this 5-foot-2-inch young lady posed no threat to the officers.'"
