= City of Rancho Palos Verdes v. Abrams =

Rancho Palos Verdes v. Abrams
- Supreme Court of the United States

Argued January 19, 2005 Decided March 22, 2005
- Full case name: City of Rancho Palos Verdes v. Abrams
- Docket no.: 03-1601
- Citations: 544 U.S. 113 (more) 125 S. Ct. 1453; 161 L. Ed. 2d 316

Case history
- Prior: Abrams v. City of Rancho Palos Verdes, 354 F.3d 1094 (9th Cir. 2004); cert. granted, 542 U.S. 965 (2004).
- Subsequent: On remand, 406 F.3d 1094 (9th Cir. 2005).

Court membership
- Chief Justice William Rehnquist Associate Justices John P. Stevens · Sandra Day O'Connor; Antonin Scalia · Anthony Kennedy; David Souter · Clarence Thomas; Ruth Bader Ginsburg · Stephen Breyer

Case opinions
- Majority: Scalia, joined by Rehnquist, O'Connor, Kennedy, Souter, Thomas, Ginsburg, Breyer
- Concurrence: Breyer, joined by O'Connor, Souter, Ginsburg
- Concurrence: Stevens (in judgment)

Laws applied
- 42 U.S.C. § 1983, Telecommunications Act

City of Rancho Palos Verdes v. Abrams, 544 U.S. 113 (2005), is a case in which the United States Supreme Court held that the Telecommunications Act (TCA) precluded damages under 42 U.S.C. § 1983 because it provided a comprehensive remedial scheme. Rancho Palos Verdes v. Abrams is a part of the Sea Clammers Doctrine line of cases.

== Background ==
Mark Abrams owned property in a residential neighborhood in Rancho Palos Verdes, California. His property was located at a high elevation, near the peak of the Rancho Palos Verdes Peninsula, which was ideal for radio transmissions. In 1989, Abrams obtained a permit to construct a 52.5 foot antenna on his property for amateur radio ("ham radio") use. In 1998, Abrams sought permission to construct a second antenna tower, but in the course of investigating the application the city learned Abrams was using his antennas for commercial purposes. This was in violation of a city ordinance requiring a conditional use permit for commercial antenna use. In July 1999, Abrams sought the requisite conditional use permit, but his neighbors provided strong opposition.

In August 2000, Abrams filled action against Rancho Palos Verdes in the District Court for the Central District of California, alleging that the denial of the conditional use permit violated the limitations placed on the city's zoning authority by the Telecommunications Act. Abrams sought injunctive relief under the Telecommunications Act and money damages and attorney's fees under 42 U.S.C. § 1983 and 42 U.S.C. § 1988.

The district court ordered the city to grant Abram's application for a conditional use permit, but refused the request for money damages and attorney's fees. The Court of Appeals for the Ninth Circuit reversed on the latter point, and remanded for determination of money damages and attorney's fees.

== Opinion of the Court ==
Justice Scalia writing for the Court reversed the Ninth Circuit's decision. Scalia held that the provision of an express, private means of redress in the Telecommunications Act is an indication that Congress intended to preclude more expansive remedies under 42 U.S.C. § 1983. The existence of a more restrictive private remedy for statutory violations is the dividing line between cases where an action would lie under § 1983 and those in which it would not.

== See also ==
- List of United States Supreme Court cases
- List of United States Supreme Court cases, volume 546
