= Bates v. Dow Agrosciences LLC =

- Supreme Court of the United States

Argued January 10, 2005 Decided April 27, 2005
- Full case name: Dennis Bates, et al., Petitioners v. Dow Agrosciences LLC
- Docket no.: 03-388
- Citations: 544 U.S. 431 (more) 125 S. Ct. 1788; 161 L. Ed. 2d 687; 2005 U.S. LEXIS 3706

Case history
- Prior: Summary judgment for defendants, 436 F. Supp. 2d 132 (Me. 2006); reversed, 501 F.3d 29 (1st Cir. 2007); cert. granted, 552 U.S. ___ (2008)

Holding
- Federal law does not preempt the application of state law in insecticide labeling requirements.

Court membership
- Chief Justice William Rehnquist Associate Justices John P. Stevens · Sandra Day O'Connor; Antonin Scalia · Anthony Kennedy; David Souter · Clarence Thomas; Ruth Bader Ginsburg · Stephen Breyer

Case opinions
- Majority: Stevens, joined by Rehnquist, O’Connor, Kennedy, Souter, Ginsburg, Breyer
- Concurrence: Breyer
- Concur/dissent: Thomas, joined by Scalia

Laws applied
- 15 U.S.C. § 1334(b) (Federal Cigarette Labeling and Advertising Act); Me. Rev. Stat. Ann., Tit. 5, § 207(Supp. 2008) (Maine Unfair Trade Practices Act)

Bates v. Dow Agrosciences LLC, 544 U.S. 431 (2005), was a case in which the Supreme Court of the United States held that the Federal Insecticide, Fungicide, and Rodenticide Act (FIFRA) did not preempt state law claims, brought by a group of Texas farmers, alleging that one of Dow's pesticides damaged their peanut crop.

== Background ==
A group of 29 peanut farmers in Texas alleged that their peanut crops were severely damaged by Dow's "Strongarm" pesticide. After the farmers informed Dow that they intended to file a lawsuit, Dow filed a request in federal district court for a declaratory judgment stating that a legal claim brought by the farmers would be preempted by FIFRA. The farmers then filed counterclaims against Dow, which alleged tort claims and violations of consumer protection laws. The district court granted Dow's motion for summary judgment and found that all but one of the farmers' claims were preempted by FIFRA. The United States Court of Appeals for the Fifth Circuit affirmed the district court's ruling. In 2004, the Supreme Court granted certiorari to resolve a circuit split regarding the extent to which FIFRA preempts claims under state law.

== Opinion of the Court ==
In an opinion written by Justice John Paul Stevens, the Court held that the farmers' claims were not preempted by FIFRA. Justice Stevens wrote that "[n]othing in the text of FIFRA would prevent a State from making the violation of a federal labeling or packaging requirement a state offense, thereby imposing its own sanctions on pesticide manufacturers who violate federal law." Justice Stevens also distinguished the facts of this case from those in Cipollone v. Liggett Group, Inc., noting that FIFRA "prohibits only state-law labeling and packaging requirements that are “in addition to or different from” the labeling and packaging requirements under FIFRA."

=== Concurring and dissenting opinions ===
Justice Stephen Breyer wrote a concurring opinion to emphasize "the importance of the [Environmental Protection] [A]gency's role in overseeing FIFRA's future implementation". Justice Clarence Thomas, joined by Justice Antonin Scalia, filed an opinion concurring in the judgment in part and dissenting in part. Justice Thomas argued that "[a] state-law cause of action, even if not specific to labeling, nevertheless imposes a labeling requirement 'in addition to or different from' FIFRA's when it attaches liability to statements on the label that do not produce liability under FIFRA."

== See also ==
- Altria Group v. Good (2008)
- List of United States Supreme Court cases
- Lists of United States Supreme Court cases by volume
- List of United States Supreme Court cases by the Rehnquist Court
