= Johnson v. California (2005) =

- Supreme Court of the United States

Decided June 13, 2005
- Full case name: Johnson v. California
- Citations: 545 U.S. 162 (more)

Holding
- A defendant satisfies the first step of Batson v. Kentucky by producing evidence sufficient to permit the trial judge to draw an inference that discrimination has occurred, and a state cannot adopt a "more likely than not" standard for this step.

Court membership
- Chief Justice William Rehnquist Associate Justices John P. Stevens · Sandra Day O'Connor; Antonin Scalia · Anthony Kennedy; David Souter · Clarence Thomas; Ruth Bader Ginsburg · Stephen Breyer

Johnson v. California, 545 U.S. 162 (2005), was a United States Supreme Court case in which the court held that a defendant satisfies the first step of Batson v. Kentucky by producing evidence sufficient to permit the trial judge to draw an inference that discrimination has occurred, and a state cannot adopt a "more likely than not" standard for this step.

== Background ==
Johnson, a Black man, was convicted in a California state court of assaulting and murdering a white child. During jury selection, a number of prospective jurors were removed for cause until 43 eligible jurors remained, three of whom were Black. The prosecutor used 3 of his 12 peremptory challenges to remove the prospective Black jurors, resulting in an all-white jury. Defense counsel objected to those strikes on the ground that they were unconstitutionally based on race. The trial judge did not ask the prosecutor to explain his strikes but instead simply found that petitioner had failed to establish a prima facie case of purposeful discrimination under the governing state precedent, People v. Wheeler, which required a showing of a strong likelihood that the exercise of peremptory challenges was based on group bias. The judge explained that, although the case was close, his review of the record convinced him that the prosecutor's strikes could be justified by race-neutral reasons.

The California Court of Appeal set aside the conviction, but the California Supreme Court reinstated it, stressing that Batson v. Kentucky permitted state courts to establish the standards used to evaluate the sufficiency of prima facie cases of purposeful discrimination in jury selection. Reviewing Batson, Wheeler, and later cases, the court concluded that Wheeler's "strong likelihood" standard is entirely consistent with Batson. Under Batson, the court held, a state court could have required the objector to present not merely enough evidence to permit an inference that discrimination has occurred, but sufficiently strong evidence to establish that the challenges, if not explained, were more likely than not based on race. Applying that standard, the court acknowledged that the exclusion of all three Black prospective jurors looked suspiciou, but deferred to the trial judge's ruling.

The Supreme Court granted certiorari.

== Opinion of the court ==
The Supreme Court issued an opinion on June 13, 2005.
