= Spector v. Norwegian Cruise Line Ltd. =

- Supreme Court of the United States

Argued February 28, 2005 Decided June 6, 2005
- Full case name: Douglas Spector, et al. v. Norwegian Cruise Line Ltd.
- Citations: 545 U.S. 119 (more) 125 S. Ct. 2169; 162 L. Ed. 2d 97; 2005 U.S. LEXIS 4655

Holding
- Title III applies to foreign-flag cruise ships in U.S. waters but not to their internal affairs. There was no "clear congressional statement" showing an intent to do so, which was necessary before a general law could interfere with a foreign vessel's internal affairs.

Court membership
- Chief Justice William Rehnquist Associate Justices John P. Stevens · Sandra Day O'Connor; Antonin Scalia · Anthony Kennedy; David Souter · Clarence Thomas; Ruth Bader Ginsburg · Stephen Breyer

Case opinions
- Majority: Kennedy, joined by Stevens, Souter, Ginsburg, Breyer (as to Parts I, II–A–1, and II–B–2); Stevens, Souter (as to Parts II–A–2, II–B–1, II–B–3, and III–B); Stevens, Souter, Thomas (as to Part III–A)
- Concurrence: Ginsburg (concurring in part and concurring in the judgment), joined by Breyer
- Concur/dissent: Thomas (concurring in part, dissenting in part, and concurring in the judgment in part)
- Dissent: Scalia, joined by Rehnquist, O'Connor (in full); Thomas (as to Part I–A)

Laws applied
- Americans with Disabilities Act of 1990

Spector v. Norwegian Cruise Line Ltd., 545 U.S. 119 (2005), was a United States Supreme Court decision that determined (in a 6–3 decision) that the Americans with Disabilities Act (ADA) applies to foreign cruise ships in American waters.

== Background ==
Douglas Spector and the four other disabled plaintiffs use mobility scooters and wheelchairs. They sued Norwegian Cruise Line under Title III of the Americans with Disabilities Act after traveling aboard cruise ships (the Norwegian Sea and the Norwegian Star) registered in the Bahamas. Spector had purchased premium tickets, which were marketed as more handicap friendly. However, the ship was not easily accessible. He had limited or no access to swimming pools, restaurants, elevators, and public restrooms because of physical barriers. The premium room was of lower quality than less expensive non-wheelchair friendly rooms. He was not allowed to participate in emergency drills and no emergency exit plan was laid out for disabled persons. Norwegian Cruise Line argued that American laws did not apply to the cruise line because it was registered in the Bahamas. The cruise line's ships, however, were based out of Miami ports.

Spector first sued the cruise line in federal district court in Houston, Texas (Spector's home town). The court ruled against Norwegian Cruise Line Ltd. saying that despite their foreign flag they must abide by American laws when in American waters. The US Court of Appeals for the Fifth Circuit overturned the lower court and moved for the case to be dismissed. Spector appealed the case to the Supreme Court.

== Decision ==
The judgment of the Fifth Circuit was reversed and the case was remanded for further proceedings. Associate Justice Anthony Kennedy delivered the judgment of the court and was joined by Justice John Paul Stevens, Justice David Souter, Justice Ruth Bader Ginsburg, and Justice Stephen Breyer (as to Parts I, II–A–1, and II–B–2); Justice Stevens, and Justice Souter (as to Parts II–A–2, II–B–1, II–B–3, and III–B); and Justice Stevens, Justice Souter, and Justice Clarence Thomas (as to Part III–A).

Justice Ginsburg wrote an opinion concurring in part and concurring in the judgment, in which she was joined by Justice Breyer. Justice Thomas wrote an opinion concurring in part, dissenting in part, and concurring in the judgment in part.

Justice Antonin Scalia wrote a dissenting opinion in which he was joined by Chief Justice William Rehnquist, Justice Sandra Day O'Connor, and which was joined by Justice Thomas (as to Part I–A).

== See also ==
- ADA Litigation in the United States
- List of United States Supreme Court cases, volume 545
- List of United States Supreme Court cases
- Flag of convenience
