= Johnson v. California =

- Supreme Court of the United States

Decided February 23, 2005
- Full case name: Johnson v. California
- Citations: 543 U.S. 499 (more)

Holding
- A prison system's policy of segregating new residents by race for the purpose of inhibiting gang violence is subject to strict scrutiny analysis.

Court membership
- Chief Justice William Rehnquist Associate Justices John P. Stevens · Sandra Day O'Connor; Antonin Scalia · Anthony Kennedy; David Souter · Clarence Thomas; Ruth Bader Ginsburg · Stephen Breyer

Case opinions
- Majority: O'Connor, joined by Kennedy, Souter, Ginsburg, Breyer
- Concurrence: Ginsburg, joined by Souter, Breyer
- Dissent: Stevens
- Dissent: Thomas, joined by Scalia
- Rehnquist took no part in the consideration or decision of the case.

Johnson v. California, 543 U.S. 499 (2005), was a United States Supreme Court case in which the court held that a prison system's policy of segregating new residents by race for the purpose of inhibiting gang violence is subject to strict scrutiny analysis.

== Background ==
The California Department of Corrections's (CDC) unwritten policy of racially segregating prisoners in double cells for up to 60 days each time they enter a new correctional facility is based on the asserted rationale that it prevents violence caused by racial gangs. Johnson, an African-American person who has been intermittently double-celled under the policy's terms ever since his 1987 incarceration, filed a lawsuit alleging that the policy violated his Fourteenth Amendment right to equal protection. The federal District Court granted the defendants, former CDC officials, summary judgment on grounds that they were entitled to qualified immunity. The Ninth Circuit Court of Appeals affirmed, holding that the policy's constitutionality should be reviewed under the deferential standard articulated in Turner v. Safley, not under strict scrutiny, and that the policy survived Turner scrutiny.

The Supreme Court granted certiorari.

== Opinion of the court ==
The Supreme Court issued an opinion on February 23, 2005. The court said that "Prisons are dangerous places, and the special circumstances they present may justify racial classifications in some contexts." However, they determined that such a policy must satisfy strict scrutiny.

== Later developments ==
Rather than the case being reheard by the 9th Circuit, the CDC and Johnson settled the case. The CDC agreed to end its use of race as the sole determinative criterion for double-celling newly arrived prisoners. Eight months after the ruling, the CDC released an "In-Cell Racial Integration Plan," which would categorize prisoners based on racial eligibility. If the prisoner was a victim or perpetrator of a racially motivated crime, they would be considered racially restricted and prevented from being housed with certain races.
