= Koons Buick, Inc. v. Nigh =

Koons Buick Pontiac GMC, Inc. v. Nigh
- Supreme Court of the United States

Argued October 5, 2004 Decided November 30, 2004
- Full case name: Koons Buick Pontiac GMC, Inc. v. Bradley Nigh
- Citations: 543 U.S. 50 (more) 125 S. Ct. 460; 160 L. Ed. 2d 389; 2004 U.S. LEXIS 7979

Holding
- The Truth in Lending Act imposes a $1000 limit on statutory damages for violations of the Act involving personal-property loans.

Court membership
- Chief Justice William Rehnquist Associate Justices John P. Stevens · Sandra Day O'Connor; Antonin Scalia · Anthony Kennedy; David Souter · Clarence Thomas; Ruth Bader Ginsburg · Stephen Breyer

Case opinions
- Majority: Ginsburg, joined by Rehnquist, Stevens, O'Connor, Kennedy, Souter, Breyer
- Concurrence: Stevens, joined by Breyer
- Concurrence: Kennedy, joined by Rehnquist
- Concurrence: Thomas
- Dissent: Scalia

Laws applied
- Truth in Lending Act's civil-liability provision, 15 U. S. C. §1640

Koons Buick Pontiac GMC, Inc. v. Nigh, 543 U.S. 50 (2004), was a case in which the Supreme Court of the United States held that Congress's 1995 amendment of the Truth in Lending Act (TILA) left unaltered the prior minimum and maximum limits of $100 and $1,000 prescribed for statutory damages awarded to plaintiffs in TILA violation suits involving personal-property loans.
