= 2004 term per curiam opinions of the Supreme Court of the United States =

The Supreme Court of the United States handed down six per curiam opinions during its 2004 term, which began October 4, 2004 and concluded October 3, 2005.

Because per curiam decisions are issued from the Court as an institution, these opinions all lack the attribution of authorship or joining votes to specific justices. All justices on the Court at the time the decision was handed down are assumed to have participated and concurred unless otherwise noted.

== Court membership ==
Chief Justice: William Rehnquist

Associate Justices: John Paul Stevens, Sandra Day O'Connor, Antonin Scalia, Anthony Kennedy, David Souter, Clarence Thomas, Ruth Bader Ginsburg, Stephen Breyer

== Smith v. Texas ==
- Full caption: LaRoyce Lathair Smith v. Texas
- Citations: 543 U.S. 37; 125 S. Ct. 400; 160 L. Ed. 2d 303; 2004 U.S. LEXIS 7668; 73 U.S.L.W. 3294; 18 Fla. L. Weekly Fed. S 6
- Prior history: Defendant convicted, Dallas County District Court, 1991; affirmed, No. 71,333 (Tex. Crim. App. June 22, 1994); cert. denied, 514 U.S. 1112 (1995); petition denied, 977 S.W.2d 610 (Tex. Crim. App. 1998); cert. denied, 525 U.S. 1148 (1999); petition denied, 132 S.W.3d 407 (Tex. Crim. App. 2004)
- Subsequent history: On remand, affirmed, sub nom. Ex parte Smith, 185 S.W.3d 455 (Tex. Crim. App. 2006)
- Full text of the opinion: official slip opinion

543 U.S. 37
Decided November 15, 2004.
Court of Criminal Appeals of Texas reversed and remanded.

The state court upheld a death sentence over the defendant's argument that the jury instructions prevented the full consideration of his mitigation evidence. The court found the instructions, which permitted the jury to consider mitigation only if it nullified two questions regarding the defendant's deliberateness in the crime, to be either irrelevant, because the defendant's mitigation evidence was constitutionally insufficient, or sufficiently distinguishable from instructions the Court had previously found unconstitutional. The Supreme Court reversed, ruling that the defendant had presented evidence relevant to mitigation, which the state court found insufficient by applying an incorrect and unduly strict test. The Court also ruled that the nullification instructions were constitutionally inadequate.

Scalia filed a dissent, joined by Thomas, stating without elaboration that he would affirm.

== San Diego v. Roe ==
- Full caption: City of San Diego, California, San Diego City Police Department; David Bejarano; George Saldamando; Glenn Breitenstein v. John Roe
- Citations: 543 U.S. 77; 125 S. Ct. 521; 160 L. Ed. 2d 410; 2004 U.S. LEXIS 8165; 150 Lab. Cas. (CCH) P59,918; 22 I.E.R. Cas. (BNA) 1; 18 Fla. L. Weekly Fed. S 21
- Prior history: Dismissed, No. 01-01760, S.D. Cal.; reversed and remanded, 356 F.3d 1108 (9th Cir. 2004)
- Full text of the opinion: official slip opinion

543 U.S. 77
Decided December 6, 2004.
Ninth Circuit reversed and remanded.

The Court of Appeals ruled that a police officer's First Amendment rights were violated when he was fired for selling online a sexually explicit video of himself in a generic police uniform. The court found that his conduct fell under the protected speech category of commentary on matters of public concern, because it did not relate to an internal workplace grievance, took place while he was off-duty and away from his employer's premises, and was unrelated to his employment.

The Supreme Court reversed, ruling that the video implicated legitimate concerns of the city police department. Though his specific department was not identified, the officer still deliberately linked the video to his profession, bringing the department into disrepute. The video's expression did not qualify as a matter of public concern under any view of the test, or based on any Court precedent.

== Brosseau v. Haugen ==
- Full caption: Rochelle Brosseau v. Kenneth J. Haugen
- Citations: 543 U.S. 194; 125 S. Ct. 596; 160 L. Ed. 2d 583; 2004 U.S. LEXIS 8275; 73 U.S.L.W. 3350; 18 Fla. L. Weekly Fed. S 48
- Prior history: Judgment for defendant, W.D. Wa.; reversed, 339 F.3d 857 (9th Cir. 2003); amended, rehearing denied, rehearing en banc denied, 351 F.3d 372 (9th Cir. 2003)
- Full text of the opinion: official slip opinion

543 U.S. 194
Decided December 14, 2004.
Ninth Circuit reversed and remanded.

The Court of Appeals ruled that an officer who had shot an individual fleeing in an automobile was not entitled to qualified immunity from the individual's section 1983 claim for violating his Fourth Amendment rights. The Supreme Court reversed, ruling that the officer was entitled to qualified immunity because Court precedent did not clearly establish that his conduct was in violation of the Constitution.

Breyer filed a concurrence, joined by Scalia and Ginsburg, urging the Court to reconsider the rigid rule which directs courts to decide the constitutional question prior to deciding the issue of immunity.

Stevens filed a dissent, arguing that the officer's conduct was objectively unreasonable because deadly force should not have been used to prevent the suspect's escape. He also believed that the immunity issue should have been decided by a jury, and that the Court should have held full briefing and argument on the case.

== Howell v. Mississippi ==
- Full caption: Marlon Latodd Howell, aka Marlon Cox v. Mississippi
- Citations: 543 U.S. 440; 125 S. Ct. 856; 160 L. Ed. 2d 873; 2005 U.S. LEXIS 1371; 18 Fla. L. Weekly Fed. S 105
- Prior history: Defendant convicted, Union County Circuit Court; affirmed, 860 So. 2d 704 (Miss. 2003); rehearing denied, No. 2001-DP-01104-SCT, 2003 Miss. LEXIS 857 (Miss. Dec. 18, 2003)
- Subsequent history: Rehearing denied, 544 U.S. 944 (2005)
- Full text of the opinion: official slip opinion

543 U.S. 440
Argued November 29, 2004.
Decided January 24, 2005.
The Court dismissed the writ of certiorari as improvidently granted.

The petitioner argued that the Mississippi courts violated his Eighth Amendment rights by refusing to require a jury instruction about a lesser included offense in his capital case. However, he failed to raise this claim before the Mississippi Supreme Court, leaving no decision on that issue for the Supreme Court to review. The writ of certiorari was accordingly dismissed as improvidently granted.

== Bell v. Cone ==
- Full caption: Ricky Bell, Warden v. Gary Bradford Cone
- Citations: 543 U.S. 447; 125 S. Ct. 847; 160 L. Ed. 2d 881; 2005 U.S. LEXIS 1369; 73 U.S.L.W. 3432; 18 Fla. L. Weekly Fed. S 97
- Prior history: Petition denied, 956 F. Supp. 1401 (W.D. Tenn. 1997); affirmed in part, reversed, 243 F.3d 961 (6th Cir. 2001); rehearing denied, 2001 U.S. App. LEXIS 11606 (6th Cir. June 1, 2001); cert. granted, 534 U.S. 1064 (2001); reversed, 535 U.S. 685 (2002); on remand, reversed, 359 F.3d 785 (6th Cir. 2004); rehearing denied, rehearing en banc denied, No. 99-5279, 2004 U.S. App. LEXIS 14439 (6th Cir. June 22, 2004)
- Subsequent history: Rehearing denied, 544 U.S. 944 (2005)
- Full text of the opinion: official slip opinion

543 U.S. 447
Decided January 24, 2005.
Sixth Circuit reversed and remanded.

The Supreme Court had previously addressed the case in Bell v. Cone, 535 U.S. 685 (2002) on the issue of the habeas petitioner's ineffective assistance of counsel claim. On remand, the Court of Appeals now ruled that the aggravator language applied to the petitioner's capital sentencing was too vague to prevent the death penalty from being imposed arbitrarily, and that the Tennessee Supreme Court had failed to cure that defect on review by applying a narrowing construction to the language. The Supreme Court reversed, ruling that the Court of Appeals did not grant the proper deference to the state court's decision, and had also erroneously assumed that it had failed to apply Tennessee law. The state court's failure to cite to federal law or explicitly use a narrowing construction did not establish that federal constitutional standards were disregarded.

Ginsburg filed a concurrence, joined by Souter and Breyer, which sought to clarify the Court's assumption that the state court had adjudicated all of the petitioner's arguments. Ginsburg urged that, had the state court failed to address an argument, that there would be no grounds for assuming that it had nevertheless sub silentio decided that issue on the merits instead of merely overlooking it.

== Medellín v. Dretke ==
- Full caption: Jose Ernesto Medellín v. Doug Dretke, Director, Texas Department of Criminal Justice, Correctional Institutions Division
- Citations: 544 U.S. 660; 125 S. Ct. 2088; 161 L. Ed. 2d 982; 2005 U.S. LEXIS 4344; 73 U.S.L.W. 4381; 18 Fla. L. Weekly Fed. S 308
- Prior history: Petition denied, S.D. Tex.; certificate of appealability denied, 371 F.3d 270 (5th Cir. 2004); cert. granted, 543 U.S. 1032 (2005)
- Subsequent history: On remand, sub nom. Ex parte Medellín, 223 S.W. 3d 315 (Tex. Crim. App. 2006); cert. granted 550 U.S. ___ (2007); aff'd, sub nom. Medellín v. Texas, 552 U.S. 491 (2008); stay and petition denied, 554 U.S. ___ (2008) (Medellín III)
- Full text of the opinion: official slip opinion

544 U.S. 660
Argued March 28, 2005.
Decided May 23, 2005.
The Court dismissed the writ of certiorari as improvidently granted.

The Court of Appeals had ruled that a Mexican national could not base a habeas petition on denial of the right to consular access under the Vienna Convention on Consular Relations, because that Convention was not enforceable in U.S. courts, and in any event that argument was forfeited because of procedural default. However, after the International Court of Justice ruled in Mexico v. United States, 2004 I.C.J. No. 128, that the Convention did create enforceable individual rights, President George W. Bush issued a memorandum declaring that the United States would discharge its obligations under the ICJ decision by having state courts give effect to it in accordance with principles of comity. The petitioner subsequently filed a new petition in state court on this basis, and the Supreme Court dismissed certiorari as improvidently granted, ruling that it should not dispose of issues that the state proceedings could resolve.

Ginsburg filed a concurrence, joined by Scalia as to Part II. O'Connor filed a dissent, joined by Stevens, Souter, and Breyer, arguing that the Court's dismissal was based on speculation as to what the state court might do. O'Connor preferred to remand the case with instructions to consider whether the decision of the ICJ was binding on American courts, and to what extent the Convention created enforceable rights that could not be forfeited through procedural default. Souter filed a dissent. Breyer filed a dissent, joined by Stevens.

== See also ==
- List of United States Supreme Court cases, volume 543
- List of United States Supreme Court cases, volume 544
