= United States Access Board =

Independent agency of the United States government overview
- Formed: 1973; 53 years ago
- Website: www.access-board.gov

The United States Access Board (also known as the Architectural and Transportation Barriers Compliance Board) is an independent agency of the United States government devoted to accessibility for people with disabilities. The Board was created in 1973 to ensure access to federally funded facilities. It develops and maintains design criteria for the built environment, transit vehicles, telecommunications equipment, and electronic and information technology. It also provides technical assistance and training on these requirements and on accessible design and continues to enforce accessibility standards that cover federally funded facilities.

The Board is structured to function as a coordinating body among federal agencies and to directly represent the public, particularly people with disabilities. Half of its members are representatives from most of the federal departments. The other half are members of the public appointed by the U.S. President, a majority of whom must have a disability.

== See also ==
- Americans with Disabilities Act
- ADA Compliance Kit
- ADA Signs
- American Disability rights movement
- Convention on the Rights of Persons with Disabilities
- Developmental disability
- Individual rights advocate
- Interactive accommodation process
- Job Accommodation Network – provides information about rights and responsibilities under the ADA and related legislation
- List of anti-discrimination acts
  - Disability discrimination act
  - Title VII of the Civil Rights Act of 1964
- List of disability rights activists
- Stigma management
- Timeline of disability rights in the United States
