= Americans with Disabilities Act of 1990 =

1990 U.S. civil rights law

- Long title: An Act to establish a clear and comprehensive prohibition of discrimination on the basis of disability
- Acronyms (colloquial): ADA
- Nicknames: Americans with Disabilities Act of 1990
- Enacted by: the 101st United States Congress
- Effective: July 26, 1990

Citations
- Public law: 101-336
- Statutes at Large: 104 Stat. 327

Codification
- Titles amended: 42 U.S.C.: Public Health and Social Welfare
- U.S.C. sections created: 42 U.S.C. ch. 126 § 12101 et seq.

Legislative history
- Introduced in the Senate as S. 933 by Tom Harkin (D–IA) on May 9, 1989; Committee consideration by Senate Labor and Human Resources; Passed the Senate on September 7, 1989 (76–8); Passed the House on May 22, 1990 (unanimous voice vote); Reported by the joint conference committee on July 12, 1990; agreed to by the House on July 12, 1990 (377–28) and by the Senate on July 13, 1990 (91–6); Signed into law by President George H. W. Bush on July 26, 1990

Major amendments
- ADA Amendments Act of 2008

United States Supreme Court cases
- Pennsylvania Dept. of Corrections v. Yeskey, 524 U.S. 206 (1998); Bragdon v. Abbott, 524 U.S. 624 (1998); Wright v. Universal Maritime Service Corp., 525 U.S. 70 (1999); Cleveland v. Policy Management Systems Corp., 526 U.S. 795 (1999); Sutton v. United Air Lines, Inc., 527 U.S. 471 (1999); Murphy v. United Parcel Service, Inc., 527 U.S. 516 (1999); Albertsons, Inc. v. Kirkingburg, 527 U.S. 555 (1999); Olmstead v. L.C., 527 U.S. 581 (1999); Board of Trustees of the University of Alabama v. Garrett, 531 U.S. 356 (2001); PGA Tour, Inc. v. Martin, 532 U.S. 661 (2001); Toyota Motor Manufacturing, Kentucky, Inc. v. Williams, 534 U.S. 184 (2002); EEOC v. Waffle House, Inc., 534 U.S. 279 (2002); US Airways, Inc. v. Barnett, 535 U.S. 391 (2002); Chevron U.S.A. Inc. v. Echazabal, 536 U.S. 73 (2002); Barnes v. Gorman, 536 U.S. 181 (2002); Clackamas Gastroenterology Associates, P.C. v. Wells, 538 U.S. 440 (2003); Raytheon Co. v. Hernandez, 540 U.S. 44 (2003); Tennessee v. Lane, 541 U.S. 509 (2004); Spector v. Norwegian Cruise Line Ltd., 545 U.S. 119 (2005); United States v. Georgia, 546 U.S. 151 (2006); Hosanna-Tabor Evangelical Lutheran Church & School v. Equal Employment Opportunity Commission, 565 U.S. 171 (2012); City and County of San Francisco v. Sheehan, No. 13-1412, 575 U.S. ___ (2015); Acheson Hotels, LLC v. Laufer, No. 22–429, 601 U.S. ___ (2023); Stanley v. City of Sanford, No. 23-997, 604 U.S. ___ (2025)

The Americans with Disabilities Act of 1990 (ADA) (42 U.S.C. § 12101) is a landmark civil rights law that prohibits discrimination based on disability. It affords similar protections against discrimination to Americans with disabilities as the Civil Rights Act of 1964, which made discrimination based on race, religion, sex, national origin, and other characteristics illegal, and later sexual orientation and gender identity. In addition, unlike the Civil Rights Act, the ADA also requires covered employers to provide reasonable accommodations to employees with disabilities, and imposes accessibility requirements on public accommodations.

In 1986, the National Council on Disability had recommended the enactment of an Americans with Disabilities Act and drafted the first version of the bill, which was introduced in the House and Senate in 1988. A broad bipartisan coalition of legislators supported the ADA, while the bill was opposed by business interests (who argued the bill imposed costs on business) and conservative evangelicals (who opposed protection for individuals with HIV). The final version of the bill was signed into law on July 26, 1990, by President George H. W. Bush. It was later amended in 2008 and signed by President George W. Bush with changes effective as of January 1, 2009.

== Disabilities included ==
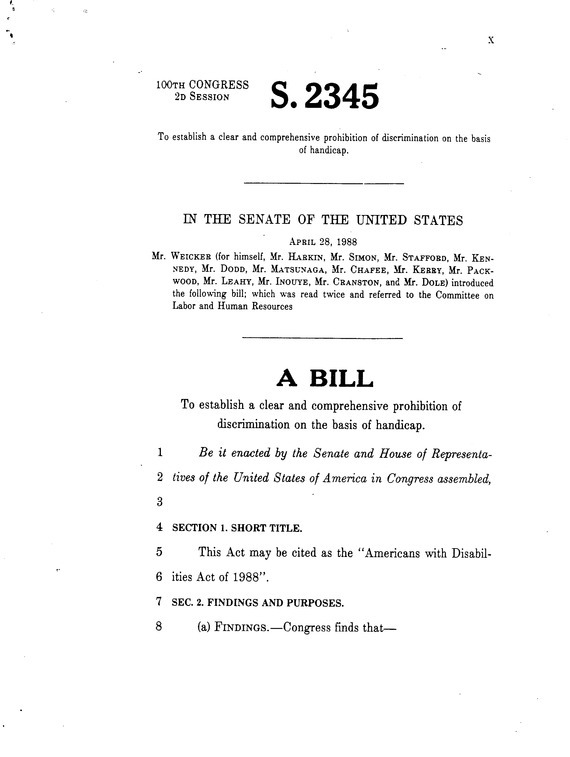
Americans with Disabilities Act of 1988, S. 2346, Page 1

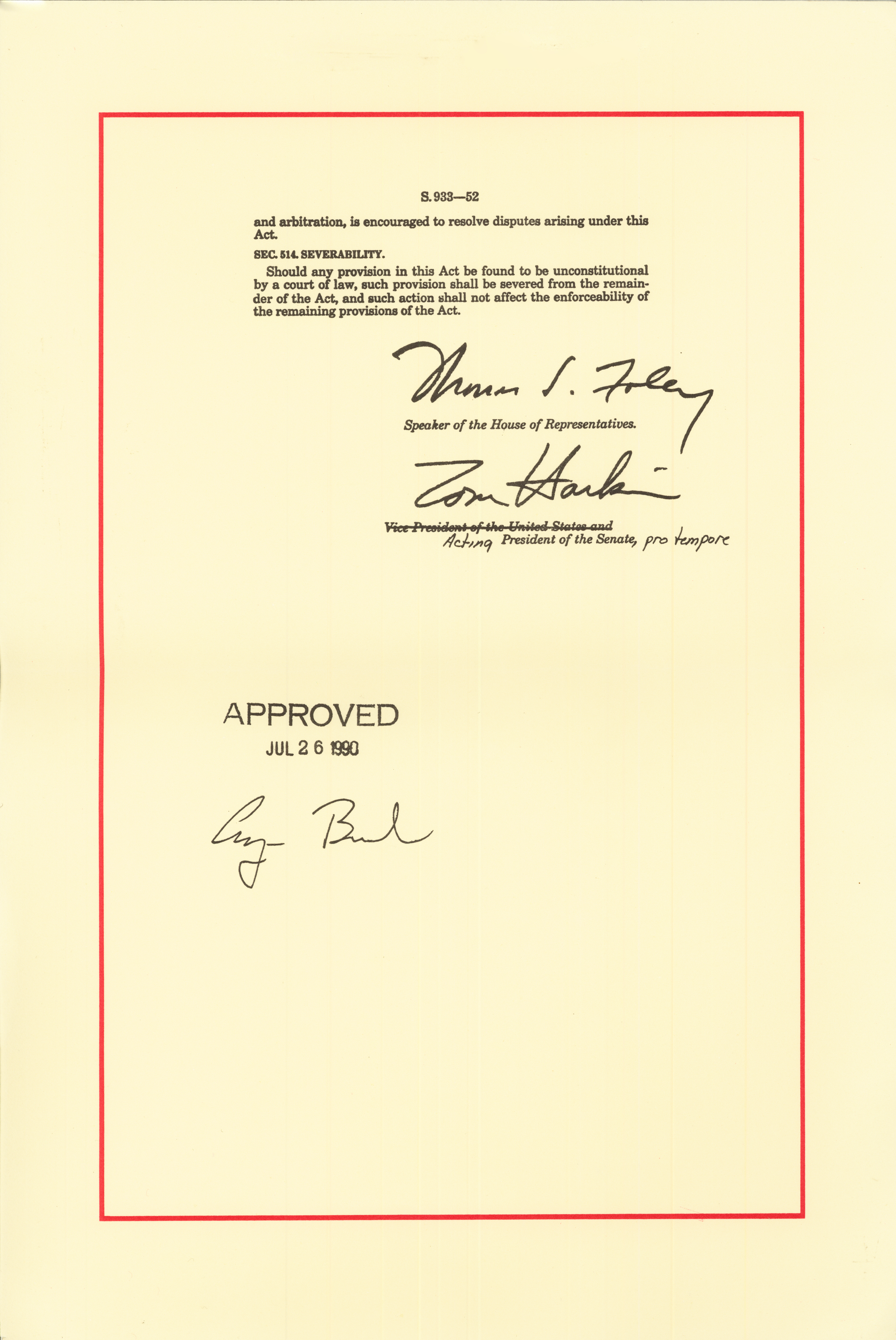
Americans with Disabilities Act of 1990, Page 52

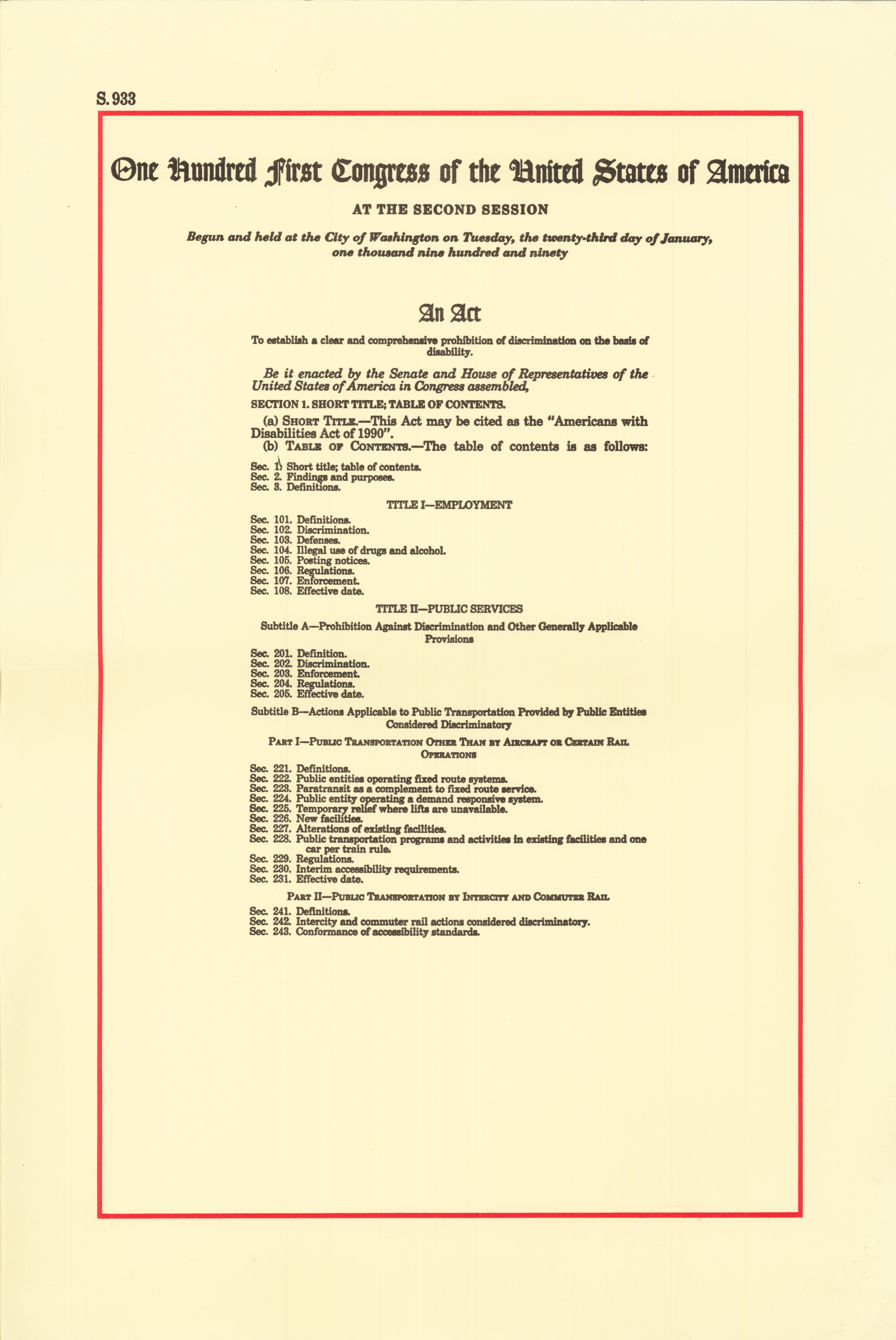
Americans with Disabilities Act of 1990, Page 1

Conditions classed as disabilities under the ADA include both mental and physical conditions. A condition does not need to be severe or permanent to be a disability. Equal Employment Opportunity Commission regulations provide a list of conditions that should easily be concluded to be disabilities: amputation, attention deficit hyperactivity disorder (ADHD), autism, bipolar disorder, blindness, cancer, cerebral palsy, deafness, diabetes, down syndrome, dwarfism, epilepsy, HIV/AIDS, intellectual disability, major depressive disorder, mobility impairments requiring a wheelchair, multiple sclerosis, muscular dystrophy, obsessive–compulsive disorder (OCD), post-traumatic stress disorder (PTSD), and schizophrenia. Other mental or physical health conditions also may be disabilities, depending on what the individual's symptoms would be in the absence of "mitigating measures" such as medication, therapy, assistive devices, or other means of restoring function, during an "active episode" of the condition (if the condition is episodic).

Certain specific conditions that are widely considered anti-social, or tend to result in illegal activity, such as kleptomania, pedophilia, exhibitionism, and voyeurism, are excluded under the definition of "disability" in order to prevent abuse of the statute's purpose. Additionally, sexual orientation is no longer considered a disorder and is also excluded from the definition of "disability". However, in 2022, the United States Court of Appeals for the Fourth Circuit stated that the ADA covers individuals with gender dysphoria, which may aid transgender people in accessing legal protections they otherwise may be unable to.

== Titles ==
=== Title I—employment ===
See also US labor law and 42 U.S.C. §§ 12111–12117.

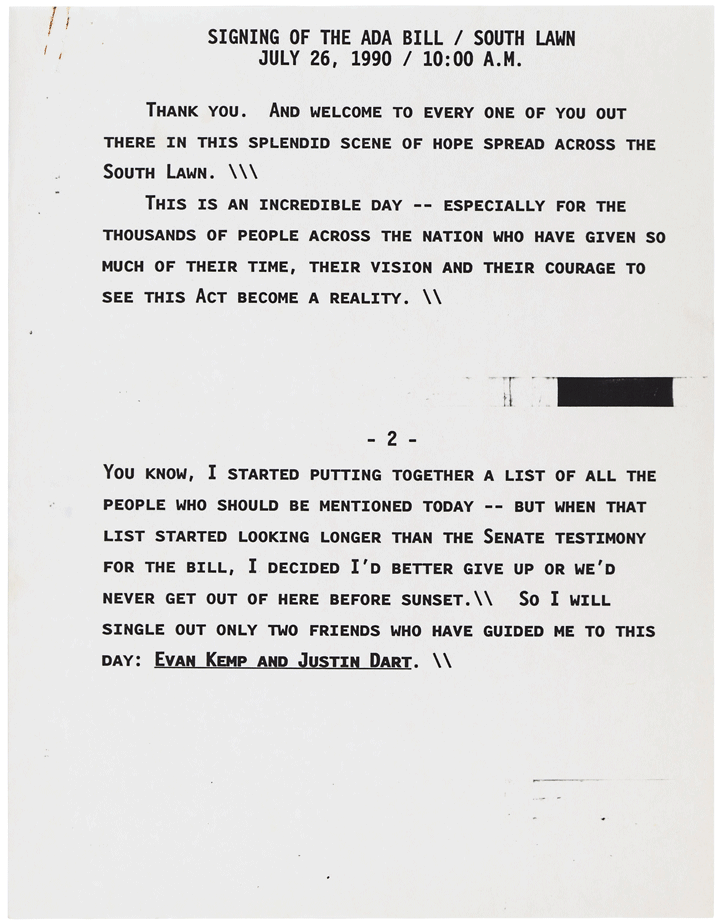
Speech cards used by President George H. W. Bush at the signing ceremony of the Americans with Disabilities Act (ADA) on July 26, 1990

The ADA states that a "covered entity" shall not discriminate against "a qualified individual with a disability". This applies to job application procedures, hiring, advancement and discharge of employees, job training, and other terms, conditions, and privileges of employment. "Covered entities" include employers with 15 or more employees, as well as employment agencies, labor organizations, and joint labor-management committees. There are strict limitations on when a covered entity can ask job applicants or employees disability-related questions or require them to undergo medical examination, and all medical information must be kept confidential.

Prohibited discrimination may include, among other things, firing or refusing to hire someone based on a real or perceived disability, segregation, and harassment based on a disability. Covered entities are also required to provide reasonable accommodations to job applicants and employees with disabilities. A reasonable accommodation is a change in the way things are typically done that the person needs because of a disability, and can include, among other things, special equipment that allows the person to perform the job, scheduling changes, and changes to the way work assignments are chosen or communicated. An employer is not required to provide an accommodation that would involve undue hardship (excessive difficulty or expense), and the individual who receives the accommodation must still perform the essential functions of the job and meet the normal performance requirements. An employee or applicant who currently engages in the illegal use of drugs is not considered qualified when a covered entity takes adverse action based on such use.

Part of Title I was found unconstitutional by the United States Supreme Court as it pertains to states in the case of Board of Trustees of the University of Alabama v. Garrett as violating the sovereign immunity rights of the several states as specified by the Eleventh Amendment to the United States Constitution. The Court determined that state employees cannot sue their employer for violating ADA rules. State employees can, however, file complaints at the Department of Justice or the Equal Employment Opportunity Commission, who can sue on their behalf.

=== Title II—public entities (and public transportation) ===
Title II prohibits disability discrimination by all public entities at the local level, e.g., school district, municipal, city, or county, and at state level. Public entities must comply with Title II regulations by the U.S. Department of Justice. These regulations cover access to all programs and services offered by the entity. Access includes physical access described in the ADA Standards for Accessible Design and programmatic access that might be obstructed by discriminatory policies or procedures of the entity.

Title II applies to public transportation provided by public entities through regulations by the U.S. Department of Transportation. It includes the National Railroad Passenger Corporation (Amtrak), along with all other commuter authorities. This section requires the provision of paratransit services by public entities that provide fixed-route services. ADA also sets minimum requirements for space layout in order to facilitate wheelchair securement on public transport.

Title II also applies to all state and local public housing, housing assistance, and housing referrals. The Office of Fair Housing and Equal Opportunity is charged with enforcing this provision.

=== Title III—public accommodations (and commercial facilities) ===
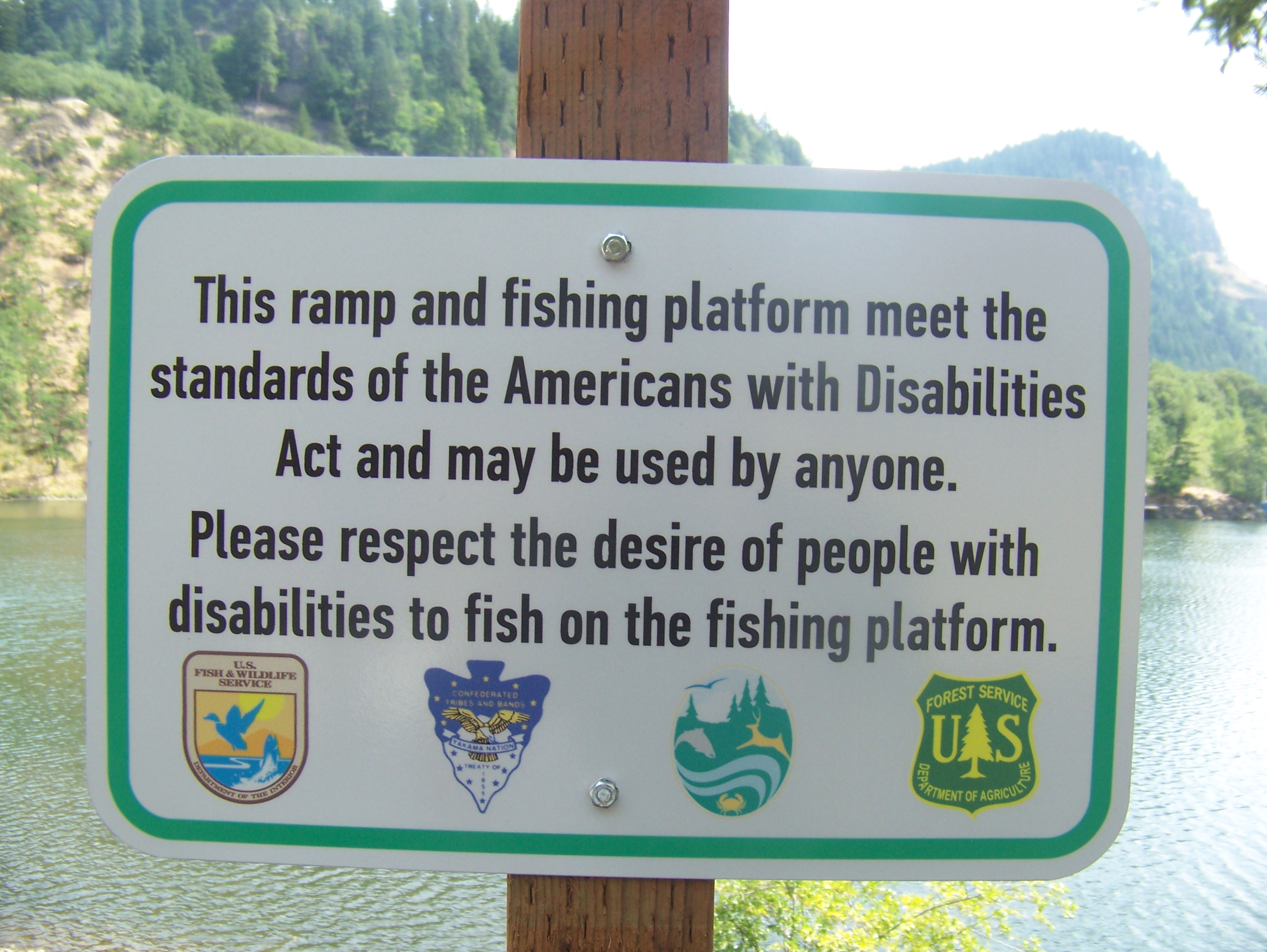
The ADA sets standards for construction of accessible public facilities. Shown is a sign indicating an accessible fishing platform at Drano Lake, Washington.

Under Title III, no individual may be discriminated against on the basis of disability with regards to the full and equal enjoyment of the goods, services, facilities, or accommodations of any place of public accommodation by any person who owns, leases, or operates a place of public accommodation. Public accommodations include most places of lodging (such as inns and hotels), recreation, transportation, education, and dining, along with stores, care providers, and places of public displays.

Under Title III of the ADA, all new construction (construction, modification or alterations) after the effective date of the ADA (approximately July 1992) must be fully compliant with the Americans With Disabilities Act Accessibility Guidelines (ADAAG) found in the Code of Federal Regulations at 28 C.F.R., Part 36, Appendix A.

Title III also has applications to existing facilities. One of the definitions of "discrimination" under Title III of the ADA is a "failure to remove" architectural barriers in existing facilities. See 42 U.S.C. § 12182(b)(2)(A)(iv). This means that even facilities that have not been modified or altered in any way after the ADA was passed still have obligations. The standard is whether "removing barriers" (typically defined as bringing a condition into compliance with the ADAAG) is "readily achievable", defined as "...easily accomplished without much difficulty or expense".

The statutory definition of "readily achievable" calls for a balancing test between the cost of the proposed alteration and the wherewithal of the business and/or owners of the business. Thus, what might be "readily achievable" for a sophisticated and financially capable corporation might not be readily achievable for a small or local business.

There are exceptions to this title; many private clubs and religious organizations may not be bound by Title III. With regard to historic properties (those properties that are listed or that are eligible for listing in the National Register of Historic Places, or properties designated as historic under state or local law), those facilities must still comply with the provisions of Title III of the ADA to the "maximum extent feasible" but if following the usual standards would "threaten to destroy the historic significance of a feature of the building" then alternative standards may be used.

Under 2010 revisions of Department of Justice regulations, newly constructed or altered swimming pools, wading pools, and spas must have an accessible means of entrance and exit to pools for disabled people. However, the requirement is conditioned on whether providing access through a fixed lift is "readily achievable". Other requirements exist, based on pool size, include providing a certain number of accessible means of entry and exit, which are outlined in Section 242 of the standards. However, businesses are free to consider the differences in the application of the rules depending on whether the pool is new or altered, or whether the swimming pool was in existence before the effective date of the new rule. Full compliance may not be required for existing facilities; Section 242 and 1009 of the 2010 Standards outline such exceptions.

==== Service animals ====
The ADA Service Animal Guidelines protect persons with disabilities and their access to public spaces, businesses, and local or state government services. Representatives for a business or organization are only allowed to ask two questions (1) ask if the animal is a service animal and (2) ask what tasks is the animal trained to perform. Business representatives are not allowed to ask the service animal to perform the task, request documentation (such as an ID) for the animal, and finally are not allowed to inquire about the nature of the person's disability. A service animal can be barred from entry or removed "if the dog's presence would fundamentally alter the nature of the goods, services, programs, or activities provided to the public".

A service animal cannot be asked to be removed unless either the animal is out of control and their handler cannot get the animal under control (e.g., the dog is barking uncontrollably and cannot be calmed) or if the animal is not housebroken. It is worth noting that a service animal is not allowed to be removed or barred from entry even in the case of another patron's allergies or of fear of animals.

Businesses that prepare or serve food must allow service animals and their owners on the premises even if state or local health laws would otherwise prohibit animals. Additional protections outlined under the ADA ensures that disabled people and their service animals cannot be isolated from other patrons, treated less favorably than other patrons, or charged fees that are not charged to other patrons without animals. The ADA also specifies that if a business requires a deposit or fee to be paid by patrons with pets, it must waive the charge for service animals.

However, there are some protections for businesses in regards to possible damages caused by a service animal such as, "if a business such as a hotel normally charges guests for damage that they cause, a customer with a disability may also be charged for damage caused by himself or his service animal."

===== 2010 Miniature Horses Provision =====
In the updated 2010 ADA update, new separate provisions allow for the classification of Miniature Horses to be considered service animals with several assessment factors designed to ensure the both safety of both the establishment and others

==== Auxiliary aids ====
The ADA provides explicit coverage for auxiliary aids.

ADA says that "a public accommodation shall take those steps that may be necessary to ensure that no individual with a disability is excluded, denied services, segregated or otherwise treated differently than other individuals because of the absence of auxiliary aids and services, unless the public accommodation can demonstrate that taking those steps would fundamentally alter the nature of the goods, services, facilities, privileges, advantages, or accommodations being offered or would result in an undue burden, i.e., significant difficulty or expense." The term "auxiliary aids and services" includes:

1. Qualified interpreters on-site or through video remote interpreting (VRI) services; notetakers; real-time computer-aided transcription services; written materials; exchange of written notes; telephone handset amplifiers; assistive listening devices; assistive listening systems; telephones compatible with hearing aids; closed caption decoders; open and closed captioning, including real-time captioning; voice, text, and video-based telecommunications products and systems, including text telephones (TTYs), videophones, and captioned telephones, or equally effective telecommunications devices; videotext displays; accessible electronic and information technology; or other effective methods of making aurally delivered information available to individuals who are deaf or hard of hearing;
2. Qualified readers; taped texts; audio recordings; Brailled materials and displays; screen reader software; magnification software; optical readers; secondary auditory programs (SAP); large print materials; accessible electronic and information technology; or other effective methods of making visually delivered materials available to individuals who are blind or have low vision;
3. Acquisition or modification of equipment or devices; and
4. Other similar services and actions.

Captions are considered one type of auxiliary aid. Since the passage of the ADA, the use of captioning has expanded. Entertainment, educational, informational, and training materials are captioned for deaf and hard-of-hearing audiences at the time they are produced and distributed. The Television Decoder Circuitry Act of 1990 requires that all televisions larger than 13 inches sold in the United States after July 1993 have a special built-in decoder that enables viewers to watch closed-captioned programming. The Telecommunications Act of 1996 directs the Federal Communications Commission (FCC) to adopt rules requiring closed captioning of most television programming. The FCC's rules on closed captioning became effective January 1, 1998.

=== Title IV—telecommunications ===
Title IV of the ADA amended the Communications Act of 1934 primarily by adding section 47 U.S.C. § 225. This section requires that all telecommunications companies in the U.S. take steps to ensure functionally equivalent services for consumers with disabilities, notably those who are deaf or hard of hearing and those with speech impairments. When Title IV took effect in the early 1990s, it led to the installation of public teletypewriter (TTY) machines and other TDD (telecommunications devices for the deaf). Title IV also led to the creation, in all 50 states and the District of Columbia, of what was then called dual-party relay services and now are known as Telecommunications Relay Services (TRS), such as STS relay. TRS-mediated calls are made over the Internet by consumers who use broadband connections. Some are Video Relay Service (VRS) calls, while others are text calls. In either variation, communication assistants translate between the signed or typed words of a consumer and the spoken words of others.

=== Title V—miscellaneous provisions ===
Title V includes technical provisions. It discusses, for example, the fact that nothing in the ADA amends, overrides or cancels anything in Section 504. Additionally, Title V includes an anti-retaliation or coercion provision. The Technical Assistance Manual for the ADA explains this provision:

III-3.6000 Retaliation or coercion. Individuals who exercise their rights under the ADA, or assist others in exercising their rights, are protected from retaliation. The prohibition against retaliation or coercion applies broadly to any individual or entity that seeks to prevent an individual from exercising his or her rights or to retaliate against him or her for having exercised those rights ... Any form of retaliation or coercion, including threats, intimidation, or interference, is prohibited if it is intended to interfere.

== History ==
The ADA has roots in Section 504 of the Rehabilitation Act of 1973.

=== Drafting ===
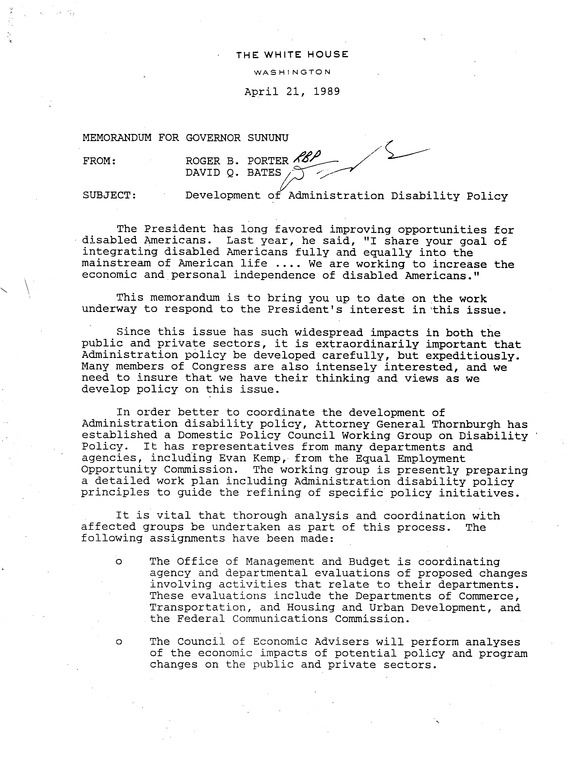
Development of George H. W. Bush Administration Disability Policy. White House Memo. April 21, 1989.

The law began in the Virginia House of Delegates in 1985 as the Virginians with Disabilities Act—supported by Warren G. Stambaugh—which was passed by the Virginia General Assembly. It is the first iteration of the Americans with Disabilities Act.

In 1986, the National Council on Disability (NCD), an independent federal agency, issued a report, Towards Independence, in which the Council examined incentives and disincentives in federal laws towards increasing the independence and full integration of people with disabilities into U.S. society. Among the disincentives to independence the Council identified was the existence of large remaining gaps in civil rights coverage for people with disabilities in the United States. A principal conclusion of the report was to recommend the adoption of comprehensive civil rights legislation, which became the ADA.

The idea of federal legislation enhancing and extending civil rights legislation to millions of Americans with disabilities gained bipartisan support in late 1988 and early 1989. In early 1989 both Congress and the newly inaugurated Bush White House worked separately, then jointly, to write legislation capable of expanding civil rights without imposing undue harm or costs on those already in compliance with existing rules and laws.

=== Lobbying ===
Over the years, key activists and advocates played an important role in lobbying members of the U.S. Congress to develop and pass the ADA, including Justin Whitlock Dart Jr., Patrisha Wright and others.

Wright is known as "the General" for her work in coordinating the campaign to enact the ADA. She is widely considered the main force behind the campaign lobbying for the ADA.

=== Support and opposition ===
==== Support ====
Senator Bob Dole, who himself had a disability resulting from war injuries, was a vocal supporter and advocate for the bill. Senators Ted Kennedy and Tom Harkin were the chief sponsors of the bill in the Senate. Kennedy described this bill as "an emancipation proclamation for the disabled, and [argued that] America will be a better, fairer, and stronger nation because of it".

==== Opposition from religious groups ====
Conservative evangelicals opposed the ADA because the legislation protected individuals with HIV, which they associated with homosexuality.

The debate over the Americans with Disabilities Act led some religious groups to take opposite positions. The Association of Christian Schools International opposed the ADA in its original form, primarily because the ADA labeled religious institutions "public accommodations" and thus would have required churches to make costly structural changes to ensure access for all. The cost argument advanced by ACSI and others prevailed in keeping religious institutions from being labeled as "public accommodations". Church groups such as the National Association of Evangelicals testified against the ADA's Title I employment provisions on grounds of religious liberty. The NAE believed the regulation of the internal employment of churches was "... an improper intrusion [of] the federal government".

==== Opposition from business interests ====
Many companies, corporations, and business groups opposed the Americans with Disabilities Act, arguing that the legislation would impose costs on businesses. Testifying before Congress, Greyhound Bus Lines stated that the act had the potential to "deprive millions of people of affordable intercity public transportation and thousands of rural communities of their only link to the outside world". The US Chamber of Commerce argued that the costs of the ADA would be "enormous" and have "a disastrous impact on many small businesses struggling to survive". The National Federation of Independent Business, an organization that lobbies for small businesses, called the ADA "a disaster for small business". Pro-business conservative commentators joined in opposition, writing that the Americans with Disabilities Act was "an expensive headache to millions" that would not necessarily improve the lives of people with disabilities.

=== "Capitol Crawl" ===
Shortly before the act was passed, disability rights activists with physical disabilities coalesced in front of the Capitol Building, shed their crutches, wheelchairs, mobility aids and other assistive devices, and immediately proceeded to crawl and pull their bodies up all 83 of the Capitol's front steps, without warning. As the activists did so, many of them chanted "ADA now", and "Vote, Now". Some activists who remained at the bottom of the steps held signs and yelled words of encouragement at the "Capitol Crawlers". Jennifer Keelan-Chaffins, a second grader with cerebral palsy, was videotaped as she pulled herself up the steps, using mostly her hands and arms, saying "I'll take all night if I have to." This direct action is reported to have "inconvenienced" several senators and to have pushed them to approve the act. While there are those who do not attribute much overall importance to this action, the "Capitol Crawl" of 1990 is seen by some present-day disability activists in the United States as a central act for encouraging the ADA into law.

=== Final passage ===
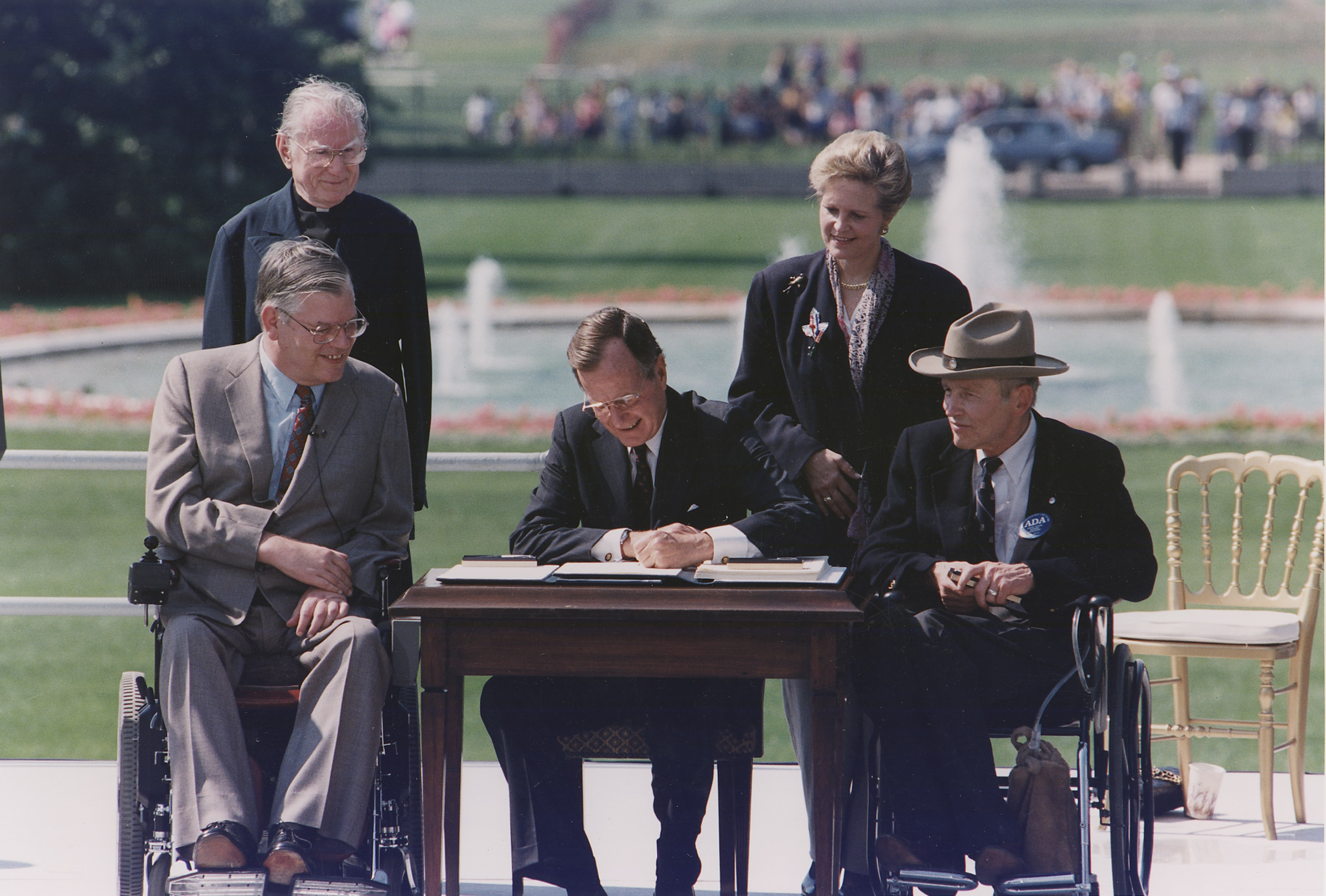
President Bush signs the Americans with Disabilities Act into law. House vote and Senate vote

Senator Tom Harkin (D-IA) authored what became the final bill and was its chief sponsor in the Senate. Harkin delivered part of his introduction speech in sign language, saying it was so his deaf brother could understand.

President George H. W. Bush, on signing the measure on July 26, 1990, said:

I know there may have been concerns that the ADA may be too vague or too costly, or may lead endlessly to litigation. But I want to reassure you right now that my administration and the United States Congress have carefully crafted this Act. We've all been determined to ensure that it gives flexibility, particularly in terms of the timetable of implementation; and we've been committed to containing the costs that may be incurred.... Let the shameful wall of exclusion finally come tumbling down.

Remarks on the Signing of the Americans with Disabilities Act (July 26, 1990)
George H. W. Bush's July 26, 1990, Remarks on the Signing of the Americans with Disabilities Act

=== ADA Amendments Act, 2008 ===
The ADA defines a covered disability as a physical or mental impairment that substantially limits one or more major life activities, a history of having such an impairment, or being regarded as having such an impairment. The Equal Employment Opportunity Commission (EEOC) was charged with interpreting the 1990 law with regard to discrimination in employment. The EEOC developed regulations limiting an individual's impairment to one that "severely or significantly restricts" a major life activity. The ADAAA directed the EEOC to amend its regulations and replace "severely or significantly" with "substantially limits", a more lenient standard.

On September 25, 2008, President George W. Bush signed the ADA Amendments Act of 2008 (ADAAA) into law. The amendment broadened the definition of "disability", thereby extending the ADA's protections to a greater number of people. The ADAAA also added to the ADA examples of "major life activities" including, but not limited to, "caring for oneself, performing manual tasks, seeing, hearing, eating, sleeping, walking, standing, lifting, bending, speaking, breathing, learning, reading, concentrating, thinking, communicating, and working" as well as the operation of several specified "major bodily functions". The act overturned a 1999 US Supreme Court case that held that an employee was not disabled if the impairment could be corrected by mitigating measures; it specifically provides that such impairment must be determined without considering such ameliorative measures. It also overturned the court's finding that an impairment that substantially limits one major life activity must also limit others to be considered a disability. In 2008, the United States House Committee on Education and Labor stated that the amendment "makes it absolutely clear that the ADA is intended to provide broad coverage to protect anyone who faces discrimination on the basis of disability". Thus the ADAAA led to broader coverage of impaired employees.

=== Web Content Accessibility Guidelines, 2019 ===
In October 2019, the Supreme Court declined to resolve a circuit split as to whether websites are covered by the ADA. The Court turned down an appeal from Domino's Pizza and let stand a U.S. 9th Circuit Court of Appeals ruling which held that the Americans with Disabilities Act protects access not just to brick-and-mortar public accommodations, but also to the websites and apps of those businesses.

== Impact ==
The ADA led to significant improvements in terms of access to public services, accessibility in the built environment, and societal understanding of disability.

=== Accessibility ===
Before the ADA, the Rehabilitation Act of 1973 laid the groundwork for accessibility. However, its enforcement was limited to institutions that received federal funding. The passage of the ADA expanded requirements to encompass state and local institutions.

=== Employment ===
Between 1991 (after the enactment of the ADA) and 1995, the employment rate of men with disabilities dropped by 7.8% regardless of age, educational level, or type of disability, with the most affected being young, less-educated and intellectually disabled men. Although no causal link between the ADA and that trend has been definitively identified, some researchers have characterized the ADA as ineffectual and argued that it caused this decline by raising the cost of doing business for employers, who quietly avoid hiring people with disabilities for fear of lawsuit. To these employers, hiring people with disabilities became too expensive as they had to spend extra on assistive technology.

From 2015 to 2024, employment trends for workers with disabilities showed mixed progress under the ADA. According to the U.S. Bureau of Labor Statistics, the employment rate for people with disabilities aged 16–64 increased from 17.5% in 2015 to 21.3% in 2023, with record gains in 2023 driven by a tight labor market and increased remote work opportunities, though it remained significantly lower than the 61.8% rate for those without disabilities. The unemployment rate for disabled workers also improved. It dropped to a low of 7.2% in 2023—a number that it still twice that of nondisabled workers (3.5%). Policy updates, such as the 2014 Workforce Innovation and Opportunity Act (WIOA), emphasized integrated employment and strengthened affirmative action for federal contractors under Section 503 of the Rehabilitation Act. Barriers, including wage gaps (disabled workers earned 66 cents for every dollar earned by nondisabled workers in 2023) and Section 14(c) of the Fair Labor Standards Act which allows subminimum wages, have drawn criticism from advocates. EEOC data from 2017 showed that 32% of all discrimination charges filed involved disability, highlighting ongoing enforcement challenges

=== Hollywood's shift towards blockbuster films ===
Edward Jay Epstein blamed the act for the replacement of large single-screen movie palaces with multiplexes with many screens. According to Epstein, the act imposed wheelchair ramp requirements on new or renovated movie theaters with more than 299 seats, so industry leader AMC Theatres and its competitors evaded this by dividing multiplexes as much as possible into small auditoriums with 299 seats or less. Then to fill all those seats, exhibitors began to book the same film across multiple screens with showtimes every hour or half hour. This helped finish off the traditional system of zones and clearances that had resulted in a much larger overall inventory of films (i.e., B movies) in the Golden Age of Hollywood. Hollywood studios shifted to producing a larger total number of big-budget action-packed blockbuster films to bring foot traffic into multiplexes. The "butterfly effect" of "the ADA challenge" (as Epstein put it) led studios to push theaters to shift to digital projection to help control the cost of opening wide on tens of thousands of screens, which has further deepened the frustration of film buffs who prefer other types of films besides action-packed blockbusters.

=== Societal attitudes ===
Before the passage of the ADA, disability was perceived as something to be cured or rehabilitated. Gradually after the passage of the ADA, societal attitudes veered towards addressing impediments to access by people with disabilities. Eventually, disability came to be viewed as a natural part of life that plays a role in positive self-identity. However, implicit biases remain within the professional, educational and medical spheres. Limited training and preconceived notions contribute to high rates of comorbidities;they contribute to lower employment rates and higher rates of arrests.

=== "Professional plaintiffs" ===
Since enforcement of the act began in July 1992, it has quickly become a major component of employment law. The ADA allows private plaintiffs to receive only injunctive relief (a court order requiring the public accommodation to remedy violations of the accessibility regulations) and attorneys' fees, and does not provide monetary rewards to private plaintiffs who sue non-compliant businesses. Unless a state law, such as the California Unruh Civil Rights Act, provides for monetary damages to private plaintiffs, persons with disabilities do not obtain direct financial benefits from suing businesses that violate the ADA.

The attorneys' fees provision of Title III does provide incentive for lawyers to specialize and engage in serial ADA litigation, but a disabled plaintiff does not obtain a financial reward from attorneys' fees unless they act as their own attorney, or as mentioned above, a disabled plaintiff resides in a state that provides for minimum compensation and court fees in lawsuits. Moreover, there may be a benefit to these private attorneys general who identify and compel the correction of illegal conditions: they may increase the number of public accommodations accessible to persons with disabilities. "Civil rights law depends heavily on private enforcement. Moreover, the inclusion of penalties and damages is the driving force that facilitates voluntary compliance with the ADA." Courts have noted:

As a result, most ADA suits are brought by a small number of private plaintiffs who view themselves as champions of the disabled. For the ADA to yield its promise of equal access for the disabled, it may indeed be necessary and desirable for committed individuals to bring serial litigation advancing the time when public accommodations will be compliant with the ADA.

California Governor Gavin Newsom speaking about the ADA on the 30th anniversary in 2020

However, in states that have enacted laws that allow private individuals to win monetary awards from non-compliant businesses (as of 2008, these include California, Florida, Hawaii, and Illinois), "professional plaintiffs" are typically found. At least one of these plaintiffs in California has been barred by courts from filing lawsuits unless he receives prior court permission. Through the end of fiscal year 1998, 86% of the 106,988 ADA charges filed with and resolved by the Equal Employment Opportunity Commission, were either dropped or investigated and dismissed by EEOC but not without imposing opportunity costs and legal fees on employers.

== Case law ==
There have been some notable cases regarding the ADA. For example, a major hotel room marketer (Hotels.com) with their business presence on the Internet was sued because their customers with disabilities could not reserve hotel rooms through their website without substantial extra efforts that persons without disabilities were not required to perform. Such lawsuits represent a major potential expansion of the ADA in that they (known as "bricks vs. clicks"), seek to expand the ADA's authority to cyberspace, where entities may not have actual physical facilities that are required to comply.

=== Paralyzed Veterans of America v. Ellerbe Becket Architects and Engineers ===
One of the first major ADA lawsuits, Paralyzed Veterans of America v. Ellerbe Becket Architects and Engineers (PVA 1996) was focused on the wheelchair accessibility of a stadium project that was still in the design phase, MCI Center (now known as Capital One Arena) in Washington, D.C. Previous to this case, which was filed only five years after the ADA was passed, the DOJ was unable or unwilling to provide clarification on the distribution requirements for accessible wheelchair locations in large assembly spaces. While Section 4.33.3 of ADAAG makes reference to lines of sight, no specific reference is made to seeing over standing patrons. The MCI Center, designed by Ellerbe Becket Architects & Engineers, was designed with too few wheelchair and companion seats, and the ones that were included did not provide sight lines that would enable the wheelchair user to view the playing area while the spectators in front of them were standing. This case and another related case established precedent on seat distribution and sight lines issues for ADA enforcement that continues to present day.

=== Green v. State of California ===
Green v. State of California, No. S137770 (Cal. August 23, 2007) was a case in which the California Supreme Court was faced with deciding whether an employee suing the state is required to prove they are able to perform "essential" job duties, regardless of whether or not there was "reasonable accommodation", or if the employer must prove the person suing was unable to do so. The court ruled the burden was on the employee, not the employer, and reversed a disputed decision by the lower courts. Plaintiff attorney David Greenberg brought forth considerations of the concept that, even in the state of California, employers do not have to employ a worker who is unable to perform "essential job functions" with "reasonable accommodation". Forcing employers to do so "would defy logic and establish a poor public policy in employment matters".

=== National Federation of the Blind v. Target Corporation ===
National Federation of the Blind v. Target Corp. was a case where a major retailer, Target Corp., was sued because their web designers failed to design its website to enable persons with low or no vision to use it.

=== Board of Trustees of the University of Alabama v. Garrett ===
Board of Trustees of the University of Alabama v. Garrett was a United States Supreme Court case about Congress's enforcement powers under the Fourteenth Amendment to the Constitution. It decided that Title I of the Americans with Disabilities Act was unconstitutional insofar as it allowed private citizens to sue states for money damages.

=== Barden v. The City of Sacramento ===
Barden v. The City of Sacramento, filed in March 1999, claimed that the City of Sacramento failed to comply with the ADA when, while making public street improvements, it did not bring its sidewalks into compliance with the ADA. Certain issues were resolved in federal court. One issue, whether sidewalks were covered by the ADA, was appealed to the 9th Circuit Court of Appeals, which ruled that sidewalks were a "program" under the ADA and must be made accessible to persons with disabilities. The ruling was later appealed to the U.S. Supreme Court, which refused to hear the case, letting stand the ruling of the 9th Circuit.

=== Bates v. United Parcel Service, Inc ===
Bates v. United Parcel Service, Inc (UPS; begun in 1999) was the first equal opportunity employment class action brought on behalf of Deaf and Hard of Hearing workers throughout the country concerning workplace discrimination. It established legal precedent for these employees to be fully covered under the ADA. Key findings included:

1. UPS failed to address communication barriers and to ensure equal conditions and opportunities for deaf employees;
2. Deaf employees were routinely excluded from workplace information, denied opportunities for promotion, and exposed to unsafe conditions due to lack of accommodations by UPS;
3. UPS also lacked a system to alert these employees as to emergencies, such as fires or chemical spills, to ensure that they would safely evacuate their facility; and
4. UPS had no policy to ensure that deaf applicants and employees actually received effective communication in the workplace.

The outcome was that UPS agreed to pay a $5.8 million settlement and agreed to a comprehensive accommodations program that was implemented in their facilities throughout the country.

=== Spector v. Norwegian Cruise Line Ltd. ===
Spector v. Norwegian Cruise Line Ltd. was decided by the United States Supreme Court in 2005. The defendant argued that as a vessel flying the flag of a foreign nation it was exempt from the requirements of the ADA. This argument was accepted by a federal court in Florida and, subsequently, the Fifth Circuit Court of Appeals. However, the U.S. Supreme Court reversed the ruling of the lower courts on the basis that Norwegian Cruise Lines was a business headquartered in the United States whose clients were predominantly Americans and, more importantly, operated out of port facilities throughout the United States.

=== Olmstead v. L.C. ===
Olmstead v. L.C. was a case before the United States Supreme Court in 1999. The two plaintiffs, Lois Curtis and E.W., were institutionalized in Georgia for diagnosed "mental retardation" and schizophrenia. Clinical assessments by the state determined that the plaintiffs could be appropriately treated in a community setting rather than the state institution. The plaintiffs sued the state of Georgia and the institution for being inappropriately treated and housed in the institutional setting rather than being treated in one of the state's community-based treatment facilities.

The Supreme Court decided under Title II of the ADA that mental illness is a form of disability and therefore covered under the ADA, and that unjustified institutional isolation of a person with a disability is a form of discrimination because it "...perpetuates unwarranted assumptions that persons so isolated are incapable or unworthy of participating in community life". The court added, "Confinement in an institution severely diminishes the everyday life activities of individuals, including family relations, social contacts, work options, economic independence, educational advancement, and cultural enrichment."

Therefore, under Title II no person with a disability can be unjustly excluded from participation in or be denied the benefits of services, programs or activities of any public entity.

=== Michigan Paralyzed Veterans of America v. The University of Michigan ===
Michigan Paralyzed Veterans of America v. The University of Michigan was a case filed before the United States District Court for the Eastern District of Michigan. It was filed on behalf of the Michigan Paralyzed Veterans of America against the University of Michigan claiming that Michigan Stadium violated the Americans with Disabilities Act in its $226-million renovation by failing to add enough seats for disabled fans or accommodate the needs for disabled restrooms, concessions and parking. Additionally, the distribution of the accessible seating was at issue, with nearly all the seats being provided in the end-zone areas. The U.S. Department of Justice assisted in the suit, which was settled in March 2008. The settlement required the stadium to add 329 wheelchair seats throughout the stadium by 2010, and an additional 135 accessible seats in clubhouses to go along with the existing 88 wheelchair seats. This case was significant because it set a precedent for the uniform distribution of accessible seating and gave the DOJ the opportunity to clarify previously unclear rules. The agreement now is a blueprint for all stadiums and other public facilities regarding accessibility.

=== Toyota Motor Manufacturing, Kentucky, Inc. v. Williams ===
Toyota Motor Manufacturing, Kentucky, Inc. v. Williams, was a case in which the US Supreme Court interpreted the meaning of the phrase "substantially impairs" as used in the Americans with Disabilities Act. It reversed a Sixth Circuit Court of Appeals decision to grant partial summary judgment in favor of the respondent, Ella Williams, that classified her inability to perform manual job-related tasks as a disability. The Court held that the "major life activity" definition for evaluating the performance of manual tasks focuses the inquiry on whether Williams was unable to perform a range of tasks central to most people in carrying out the activities of daily living, not whether Williams was unable to perform her specific job tasks. Therefore, the determination of whether an impairment rises to the level of a disability is not limited to activities in the workplace solely, but rather to manual tasks in life in general. When the Supreme Court applied this standard, it found that the Court of Appeals had incorrectly determined the presence of a disability because it relied solely on her inability to perform specific manual work tasks, which was insufficient in proving the presence of a disability. The Court of Appeals should have taken into account the evidence presented that Williams retained the ability to do personal tasks and household chores, such activities being the nature of tasks most people do in their daily lives, and placed too much emphasis on her job disability. Since the evidence showed that Williams was performing normal daily tasks, it ruled that the Court of Appeals erred when it found that Williams was disabled. This ruling has since been legislatively overturned by the ADA Amendments Act of 2008 (ADAAA). In fact, Congress explicitly cited Toyota v. Williams in the text of the ADAAA itself as one of its driving influences for passing the ADAAA.

=== US Airways, Inc. v. Barnett ===
US Airways, Inc. v. Barnett was decided by the US Supreme Court in 2002. This case held that even requests for accommodation that might seem reasonable on their face, e.g., a transfer to a different position, can be rendered unreasonable because it would require a violation of the company's seniority system. While the court held that, in general, a violation of a seniority system renders an otherwise reasonable accommodation unreasonable, a plaintiff can present evidence that, despite the seniority system, the accommodation is reasonable in the specific case at hand, e.g., the plaintiff could offer evidence that the seniority system is so often disregarded that another exception would not make a difference.

Importantly, the court held that the defendant need not provide proof that this particular application of the seniority system should prevail, and that, once the defendant showed that the accommodation violated the seniority system, it fell to Barnett to show it was nevertheless reasonable.

In this case, Barnett was a US Airways employee who injured his back, rendering him physically unable to perform his cargo-handling job. Invoking seniority, he transferred to a less-demanding mailroom job, but this position later became open to seniority-based bidding and was bid on by more senior employees. Barnett requested the accommodation of being allowed to stay on in the less-demanding mailroom job. US Airways denied his request, and he lost his job.

The Supreme Court decision invalidated both the approach of the district court, which found that the mere presence and importance of the seniority system was enough to warrant a summary judgment in favor of US Airways, as well as the circuit court's approach that interpreted 'reasonable accommodation' as 'effective accommodation.'

=== Access Now v. Southwest Airlines ===
Access Now, Inc. v. Southwest Airlines Co. was a 2002 case where the District Court decided that the website of Southwest Airlines was not in violation of the Americans with Disabilities Act, because the ADA is concerned with things with a physical existence and thus cannot be applied to cyberspace. Judge Patricia A. Seitz found that the "virtual ticket counter" of the website was a virtual construct, and hence not a "public place of accommodation". As such, "To expand the ADA to cover 'virtual' spaces would be to create new rights without well-defined standards."

=== Ouellette v. Viacom International Inc. ===
Ouellette v. Viacom International Inc. (2011) held that a mere online presence does not subject a website to the ADA guidelines. Thus Myspace and YouTube were not liable for a dyslexic man's inability to navigate the site regardless of how impressive the "online theater" is.

=== Authors Guild v. HathiTrust ===
Authors Guild v. HathiTrust (2014) was a case in which the District Court decided that the HathiTrust digital library was a transformative, fair use of copyrighted works, making a large number of written text available to those with print disability.

=== Zamora-Quezada v. HealthTexas Medical Group ===
Zamora-Quezada v. HealthTexas Medical Group (begun in 1998) was the first time this act was used against HMOs when a novel lawsuit was filed by Texas attorney Robert Provan against five HMOs for their practice of revoking the contracts of doctors treating disabled patients. In 1999, these HMOs sought to dismiss Provan's lawsuit, but a federal court ruled against them, and the case was settled out of court. Many decisions relating to Provan's unique lawsuit against these HMOs have been cited in other court cases since. (Note: Attributed to multiple sources:)

=== Campbell v. General Dynamics Government Systems Corp. ===
Campbell v. General Dynamics Government Systems Corp. (2005) concerned the enforceability of a mandatory arbitration agreement contained in a dispute resolution policy linked to an e-mailed company-wide announcement, insofar as it applies to employment discrimination claims brought under the Americans with Disabilities Act.

=== Tennessee v. Lane ===
Tennessee v. Lane, 541 U.S. 509 (2004), was a case in the Supreme Court of the United States involving Congress's enforcement powers under section 5 of the Fourteenth Amendment. George Lane was unable to walk after a 1997 car accident in which he was accused of driving on the wrong side of the road. A woman was killed in the crash, and Lane faced misdemeanor charges of reckless driving. The suit was brought about because he was denied access to appear in criminal court because the courthouse had no elevator, even though the court was willing to carry him up the stairs and then willing to move the hearing to the first floor. He refused, citing he wanted to be treated as any other citizen, and was subsequently charged with failure to appear, after appearing at a previous hearing where he dragged himself up the stairs. The court ruled that Congress did have enough evidence that disabled people were being denied those fundamental rights that are protected by the Due Process clause of the Fourteenth Amendment and had the enforcement powers under section 5 of the Fourteenth Amendment. It further ruled that "reasonable accommodations" mandated by the ADA were not unduly burdensome and disproportionate to the harm.

=== Acheson Hotels, LLC v. Laufer ===
Acheson Hotels, LLC v. Laufer was a 2023 Supreme Court case regarding whether "tester" plaintiffs—individuals who never sought to patronize the defendant business, but sued for noticed violations anyways—have standing to sue under the Americans with Disabilities Act. The case was ultimately dismissed as moot, since the defendant updated their website to be ADA-compliant and the plaintiff requested that her case be dismissed. As such, the question of the standing of "tester" plaintiffs was not addressed.

=== Gender dysphoria ===
In 2022, the United States Court of Appeals for the Fourth Circuit stated that the ADA covers individuals with gender dysphoria, which may aid transgender people in accessing legal protections they otherwise may be unable to.

== See also ==
- ADA Compliance Kit
- ADA Signs
- American Disability rights movement
- Convention on the Rights of Persons with Disabilities
- Developmental disability
- Disability in the United States
- European Accessibility Act
- Individual rights advocate
- Interactive accommodation process
- Job Accommodation Network
- List of anti-discrimination acts
  - Disability discrimination act
  - Title VII of the Civil Rights Act of 1964
  - Architectural Barriers Act of 1968
- List of disability rights activists
- Stigma management
- Timeline of disability rights in the United States
- United States Access Board
- Wheelchair ramp
