= Access Now, Inc. v. Southwest Airlines Co. =

2002 decision of the United States District Court

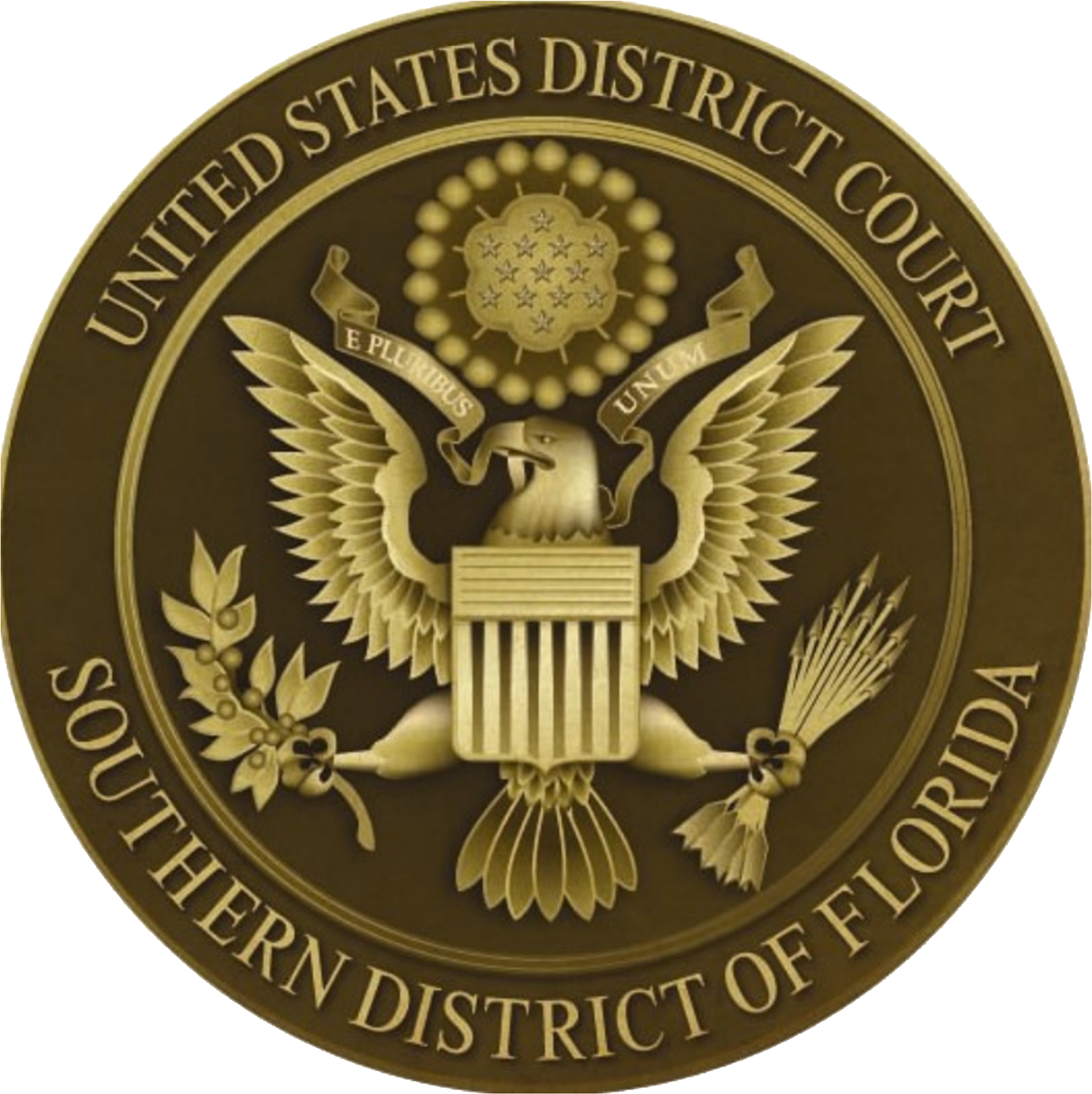
- Court: United States District Court for the Southern District of Florida
- Decided: August 18, 2002
- Docket nos.: 1:02-cv-21734
- Citation: 227 F. Supp. 2d 1312

Case history
- Subsequent actions: Affirmed, 385 F.3d 1324 (11th Cir. 2004)

Court membership
- Judge sitting: Patricia A. Seitz

Access Now, Inc. v. Southwest Airlines Co., 227 F. Supp. 2d 1312 (S.D. Fla. 2002), was a decision of the United States District Court on 18 August 2002. It concerned the nature of Title III of the Americans with Disabilities Act of 1990. The court determined that the Southwest Airlines website was not a "place of public accommodation" as defined in Title III of the Americans with Disabilities Act of 1990. The case determined that the Southwest Airlines website was not in violation of the Americans with Disabilities Act of 1990 as the Americans with Disabilities Act (ADA) is concerned with a physical existence and hence cannot govern what it is in cyberspace. Judge Seitz also explained that the "virtual ticket counter" Southwest Airlines Co's website was a virtual construct and hence not a "public place of accommodation" and as such "To expand the ADA to cover "virtual" spaces would be to create new rights without well-defined standards".

== Decisions ==
Access Now, Inc. v. Southwest Airlines Co., was a decision of the United States District Court, which on 18 August 2002 ruled that Southwest Airlines Co's website is not a "place of public accommodation" as defined in Title III of the Americans with Disabilities Act. The case concerned Robert Gumson, a blind American man living in Florida, United States of America. The plaintiffs; Access Now, Inc and Robert Gumson argued that Southwest Airline's internet website violated the Americans with Disabilities Act (ADA) (42 U.S.C. § 12101 et seq.) as the airlines website was not accessible to the blind such as Robert Gumson.

The main topic that the United States District Court considered was whether Title III of the Americans with Disabilities Act (public services) requires companies such as Southwest Airlines Co. to edit their websites to be completely accessible to visually impaired people such as Mr. Gumson. The United States district court ultimately decided in favour of the defendant and not the plaintiffs. The judge for this case, Patrica Seitz elucidates that the plaintiff could not apply for Title III of ADA as Type III "governs solely access to physical, concrete places of public accommodation" and hence cannot govern what it is in cyberspace. Judge Partrica Seitz also explained that the "virtual ticket counter" located on Southwest Airlines Co's website was a virtual construct and hence not a "public place of accommodation" and as such "To expand the ADA to cover "virtual" spaces would be to create new rights without well-defined standards."

=== Place of public accommodation ===
The main question in the case was the question of internet websites as a "place of public accommodation" as defined by the ADA. The place was defined in such a way that it did not require a detailed understanding of the statute. The Americans with Disabilities Act attempts to ensure equal access to schooling, services, faculties, etc. for all people whether they are disabled or not. (42 U.S.C. § 12182(a))

A place of public accommodation was defined by a physical construction of 12 categories and within these constructs a place of public accommodation was given to businesses, whose operation affects the global market. A public accommodation, as defined by the ADA, is a physical structure that does not cover cyberspace. The plaintiff argued that the website fell under the category of entertainment, as a place of public display or as a sales establishment. The judge was dismissive of such comments as these terms are very subjective and can be answered in a variety of ways.

In determining that statute, the statute must be "plain and have an ambiguous meaning" to its language. It was also determined that section III did not incorporate the use of websites. Unlike this case, the Eleventh Circuit Court case was able to ascertain the congress's intention. The creation of new rights and laws from Congress is needed to develop standards that apply to rights. Similarly, the Congress also denied the expansion of the Act to cover virtual spaces and not just physical space. The congress refused to combine aspects of each accommodation since it was numerous.

The court has explained its limited reading of the ADA in reference to the Eleventh Circuit Court case, in Rendon, where the court has maintained that the telephone selection process for determining an automated telephone selection process of the television show, Who Wants to Be a Millionaire?. This screening was said to be discriminatory against disabled people. Also, in that court case, there was only a "nexus between the challenged service and the premises of the public accommodation." The court had found that Southwest's website was not a physical public accommodation or applicable to concrete space (227 F. Supp. 2d at 1321), and hence plaintiffs could not demonstrate a "specific, physical, concrete space." The court reasoned that the Internet is a "unique medium" that had a "nexus between challenged service and physical accommodations. For the geographic location, the District Court utilised the decision from the Supreme Court in Reno v. ACLU (521 U.S. 844 (1997)), where its medium had no unique location geographically and is available for everyone across the globe. Thus, the website for the airplane company is not based on a geographical location and, hence, there is no nexus for places of public accommodation. Therefore, it can be seen that in the absence of a physical place, there was a lack of public accommodation or nexus.
