= Trailhead =

Point at which a trail begins

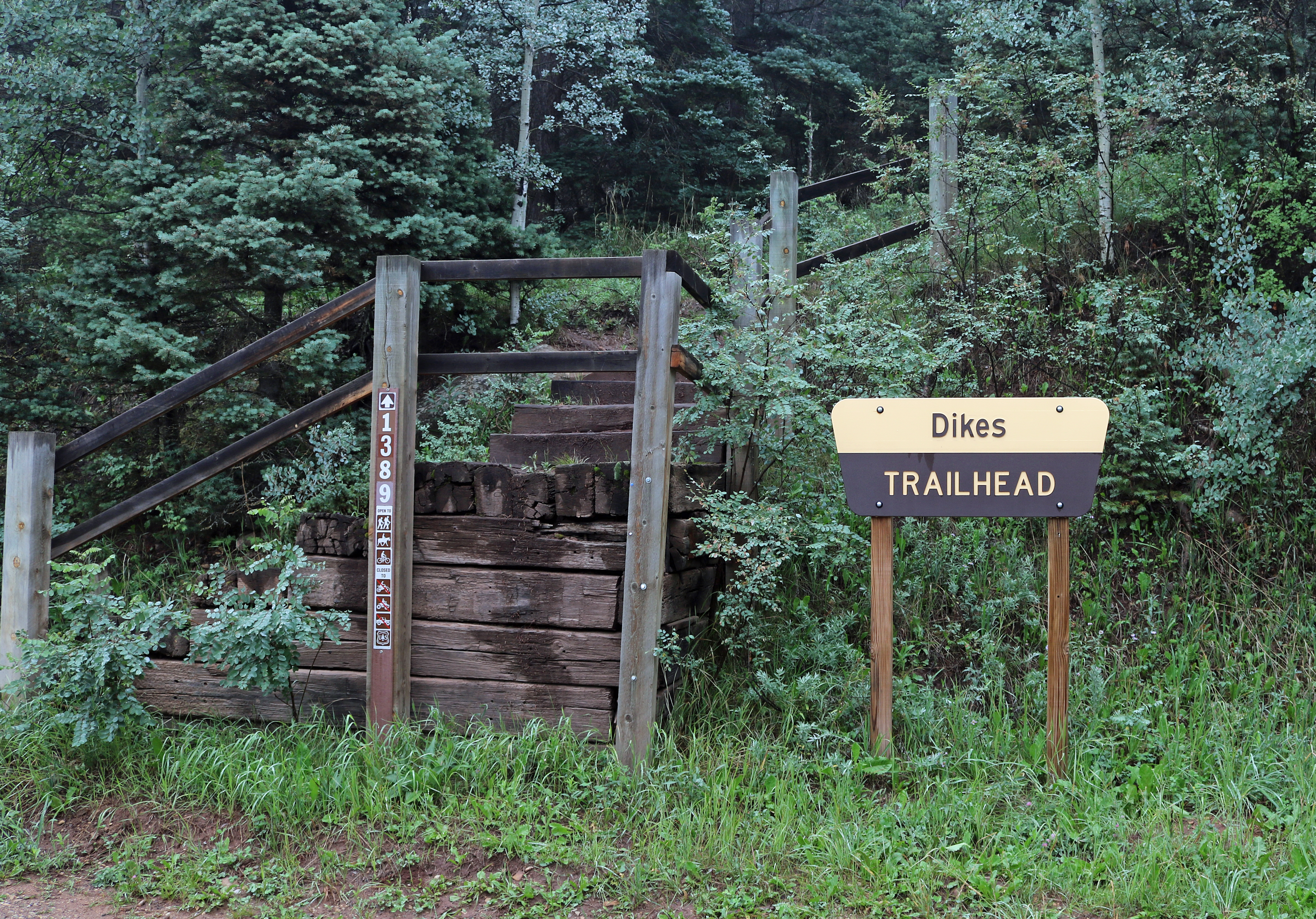
Trailhead for Dike Trail no. 1389, in the San Isabel National Forest, Colorado

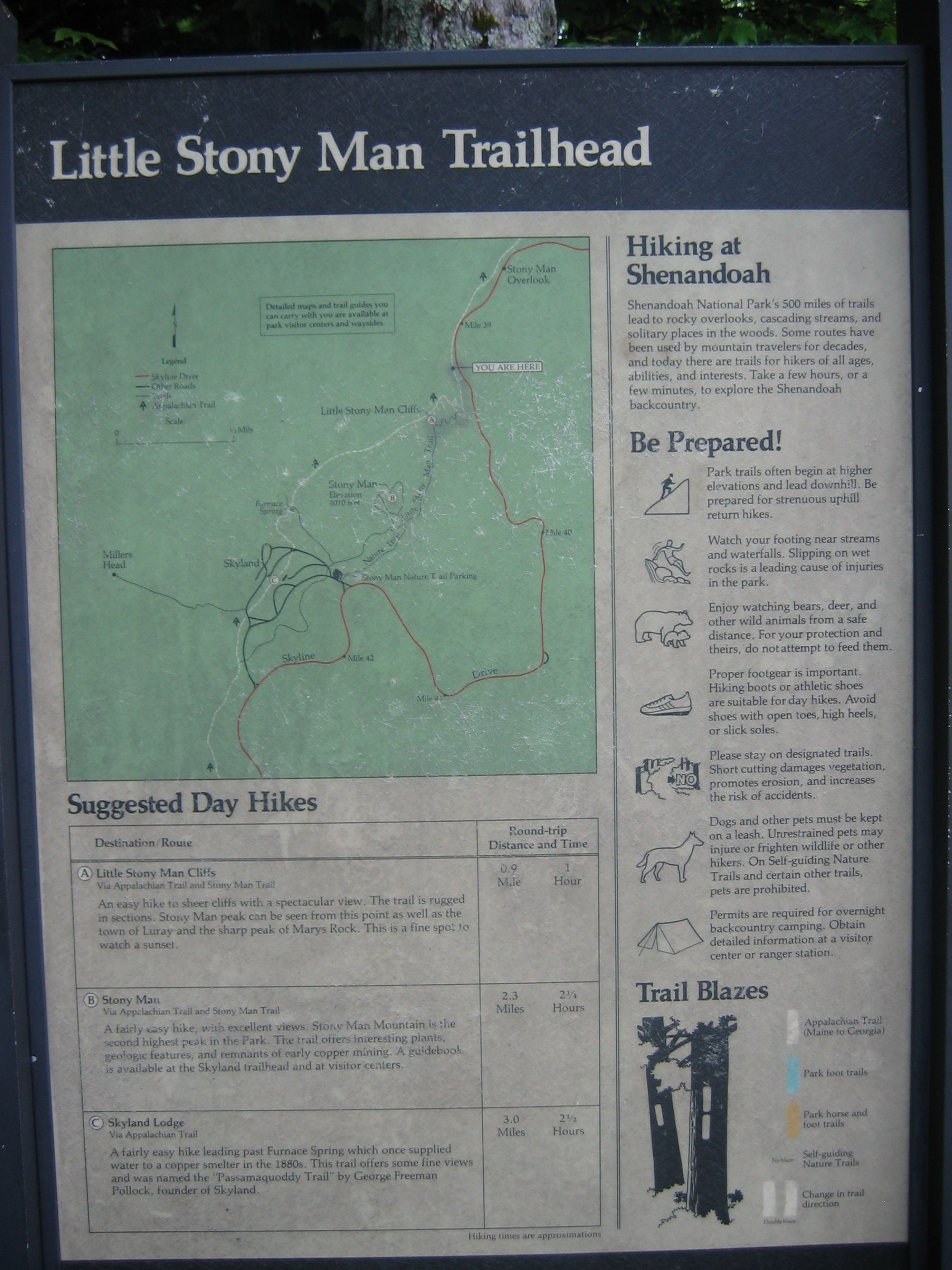
Trailhead sign

A trailhead is the point where a trail begins or is accessed, where the trail is often intended for hiking, biking, horseback riding, or off-road vehicles. Modern trailheads often contain restrooms, maps, signposts, and distribution centers for informational brochures about the trail and its features and parking areas for vehicles and trailers.

The United States Access Board defines a trailhead "as an outdoor space that is designated by an entity responsible for administering or maintaining a trail to serve as an access point to the trail." The intersection of two trails is a trail junction and does not constitute a trailhead.

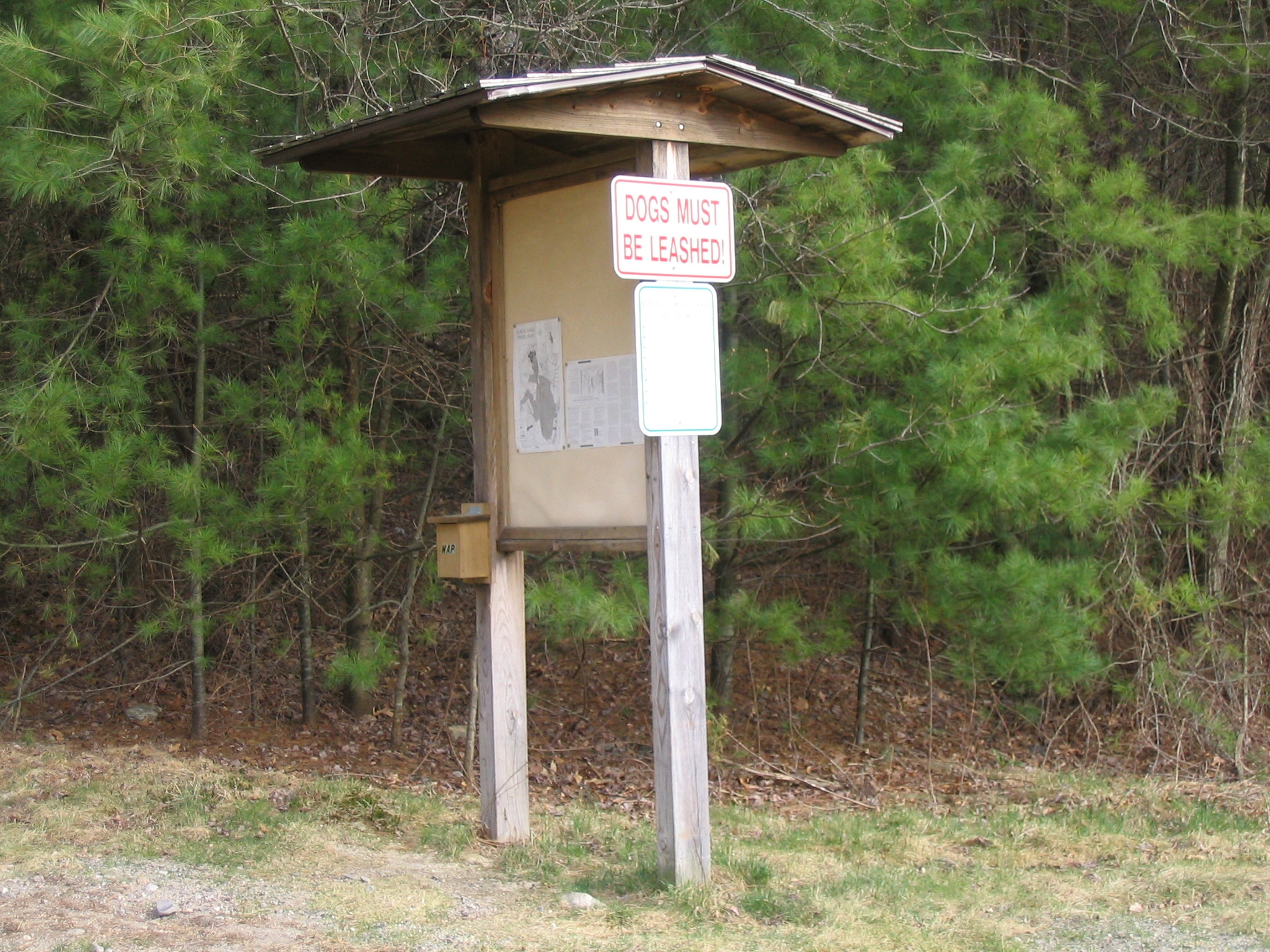
Kiosk at a trailhead

Historically, the cities located at the terminus of major pathways for foot traffic, such as the Natchez Trace and the Chisholm Trail, were also known as trailheads.

For mountain climbing and hiking, the elevation of the trailhead above sea level is posted to give an idea of how high the mountain is above the average terrain. A trailhead may also feature a trail grade, which determines the walking difficulty of the trail.

== See also ==
- Trail blazing
