= Sutton v. United Air Lines, Inc. =

- Supreme Court of the United States

Argued April 28, 1999 Decided June 22, 1999
- Full case name: Karen Sutton and Kimberly Hinton, Petitioners v. United Air Lines, Inc.
- Docket no.: 97-1943
- Citations: 527 U.S. 471 (more)
- Argument: Oral argument

Case history
- Subsequent: Overturned by Americans with Disabilities Act Amendments Act of 2008

Holding
- Mitigating measures should be taken into consideration when determining whether an impairment constitutes a disability under the ADA.

Court membership
- Chief Justice William Rehnquist Associate Justices John P. Stevens · Sandra Day O'Connor; Antonin Scalia · Anthony Kennedy; David Souter · Clarence Thomas; Ruth Bader Ginsburg · Stephen Breyer

Case opinions
- Majority: Justice O'Connor
- Concurrence: Justice Ginsburg
- Dissent: Justice Stevens
- Dissent: Justice Breyer

Laws applied
- Americans with Disabilities Act of 1990
- Superseded by
- ADA Amendments Act of 2008

Sutton v. United Air Lines, Inc., 527 U.S. 471 (1999), was a case decided by the United States Supreme Court on June 22, 1999. The Court decided that mitigating measures should be taken into account when determining whether one's impairment constitutes a disability under the Americans with Disabilities Act of 1990 (ADA). The holding of this case was later overturned by the passage of the ADA Amendments Act of 2008.

== Background ==
Twins Karen Sutton and Kimberly Hinton suffered from severe myopia. Their uncorrected visual acuity was 20/200, but with corrective lenses, both were able to function normally. They applied to United Air Lines to be commercial airline pilots, but were rejected by the company due to their uncorrected vision being worse than 20/100. The twins then filed suit under the Americans with Disabilities Act of 1990 in the U.S. District Court for the District of Colorado. The District Court dismissed the complaint, partially holding that the plaintiffs could not be considered “disabled” because their impairment could be fully corrected.

The United States Court of Appeals for the Tenth Circuit affirmed the District Court's decision. The plaintiffs then appealed to the United States Supreme Court. The American Civil Liberties Union also filed an amicus brief in support of the plaintiffs.

== Decision ==
In a 7–2 decision delivered by Justice O’Connor, the U.S. Supreme Court affirmed, holding that "the determination of whether an individual is disabled should be made with reference to measures that mitigate the individual's impairment, including, in this instance, eyeglasses and contact lenses."

Justice Ginsburg issued a concurring opinion. Justices Stevens and Breyer wrote dissenting opinions.

== Significance ==
Prior to the Sutton decision, courts were divided on whether ameliorative effects of mitigating measures should be taken into consideration when determining whether an impairment is a disability. Sutton's interpretation of the ADA ended this disagreement.

== Subsequent history ==
The ADA Amendments Act (ADAAA) was passed in 2008 in response to controversial Supreme Court decisions, including Sutton and Toyota Motor Manufacturing, Kentucky, Inc. v. Williams, that narrowed the definition of disability under the ADA.

According to the "Findings and Purposes" section of the ADAAA, "the holdings of the Supreme Court in Sutton v. United Air Lines, Inc., 527 U.S. 471 (1999) and its companion cases have narrowed the broad scope of protection intended to be afforded by the ADA, thus eliminating protection for many individuals whom Congress intended to protect."

== See also ==
- ADA Amendments Act of 2008
- ADA Litigation in the United States
- Americans with Disabilities Act of 1990
- List of anti-discrimination acts
- List of United States Supreme Court cases, volume 527
