= Judge Seitz =

Judge Seitz may refer to:

- Collins J. Seitz (1914–1998), judge of the United States Court of Appeals for the Third Circuit
- Patricia A. Seitz (born 1946), judge of the United States District Court for the Southern District of Florida
