= Olmstead v. L.C. =

- Supreme Court of the United States

Argued April 21, 1999 Decided June 22, 1999
- Full case name: Tommy Olmstead, Commissioner, Georgia Department of Human Resources, et al., Petitioners v. L. C., by Jonathan Zimring, guardian ad litem and next friend, et al.
- Citations: 527 U.S. 581 (more) 119 S. Ct. 2176; 144 L. Ed. 2d 540; 1999 U.S. LEXIS 4368; 67 U.S.L.W. 4567; 9 Am. Disabilities Cas. (BNA) 705; 99 Cal. Daily Op. Service 4859; 99 Daily Journal DAR 6263; 1999 Colo. J. C.A.R. 3627; 12 Fla. L. Weekly Fed. S 424
- Argument: Oral argument

Holding
- Under Title II of the ADA, States are required to place persons with mental disabilities in community settings rather than in institutions when the State's treatment professionals have determined that: (1) community placement is appropriate, (2) the transfer from institutional care to a less restrictive setting is not opposed by the affected individual, and (3) the placement can be reasonably accommodated, taking into account the resources available to the State and the needs of others with mental disabilities.

Court membership
- Chief Justice William Rehnquist Associate Justices John P. Stevens · Sandra Day O'Connor; Antonin Scalia · Anthony Kennedy; David Souter · Clarence Thomas; Ruth Bader Ginsburg · Stephen Breyer

Case opinions
- Majority: Ginsburg, joined by O'Connor, Souter, Breyer (in full); Stevens (except part III-B)
- Concurrence: Stevens (in part)
- Concurrence: Kennedy (in judgment), joined by Breyer (part I)
- Dissent: Thomas, joined by Rehnquist, Scalia

Laws applied
- Americans with Disabilities Act of 1990

Olmstead v. L.C., 527 U.S. 581 (1999), is a United States Supreme Court case regarding discrimination against people with mental disabilities. The Supreme Court held that under the Americans with Disabilities Act, individuals with mental disabilities have the right to live in the community rather than in institutions if, in the words of the opinion of the Court, "the State's treatment professionals have determined that community placement is appropriate, the transfer from institutional care to a less restrictive setting is not opposed by the affected individual, and the placement can be reasonably accommodated, taking into account the resources available to the State and the needs of others with mental disabilities." The case was brought by the Atlanta Legal Aid Society on behalf of Lois Curtis.

== Background ==
Tommy Olmstead, Commissioner, Georgia Department of Human Resources, et al. v. L. C., by Zimring, guardian ad litem and next friend, et al. (Olmstead v. L.C.) was a case filed in 1995 and decided in 1999 before the United States Supreme Court. The plaintiffs, L.C. (Lois Curtis, deceased November 3, 2022) and E.W. (Elaine Wilson, deceased December 4, 2005), were two women who were diagnosed with schizophrenia, intellectual disability and personality disorder. They had both been treated in institutional settings and in community-based treatments in the state of Georgia.

Following clinical assessments by state employees, both plaintiffs were determined to be better suited for treatment in a community-based setting rather than in the institution. The plaintiffs remained confined in the institution, each for several years after the initial treatment was concluded. Both sued the state of Georgia to prevent them from being inappropriately treated and housed in the institutional setting.

== Opinion of the Court ==
The case rose to the level of the United States Supreme Court, which decided the case in 1999, and played a major role in determining that mental illness is a form of disability and therefore covered under the Americans with Disabilities Act (ADA). Title II of the ADA applies to "public entities" which include "state and local governments" and "any department, agency or special purpose district" and protects any "qualified person with a disability" from exclusion from participation in or denied the benefits of services, programs, or activities of a public entity.

The Supreme Court ruled that mental illness is a form of disability and that "unjustified isolation" of a person with a disability is a form of discrimination under Title II of the ADA. It further held that community placement is only required and appropriate (i.e., institutionalization is unjustified), when –"[a] the State's treatment professionals have determined that community placement is appropriate, [b] the transfer from institutional care to a less restrictive setting is not opposed by the affected individual, and [c] the placement can be reasonably accommodated, taking into account the resources available to the State and the needs of others with mental disabilities." It also ruled that unjustified isolation is discrimination based on disability.

The Supreme Court explained that this holding "reflects two evident judgments". First, "institutional placement of persons who can handle and benefit from community settings perpetuates unwarranted assumptions that persons so isolated are incapable or unworthy of participating in community life." Second, historically "confinement in an institution severely diminishes the everyday life activities of individuals, including family relations, social contacts, work options, economic independence, educational advancement, and cultural enrichment."

However, a majority of Justices in Olmstead also recognized an ongoing role for publicly and privately operated institutions: "We emphasize that nothing in the ADA or its implementing regulations condones termination of institutional settings for persons unable to handle or benefit from community settings...Nor is there any federal requirement that community-based treatment be imposed on patients who do not desire it."

A plurality of justices noted: "[N]o placement outside the institution may ever be appropriate . . . 'Some individuals, whether mentally retarded or mentally ill, are not prepared at particular times - perhaps in the short run, perhaps in the long run - for the risks and exposure of the less protective environment of community settings' for these persons, 'institutional settings are needed and must remain available'" (quoting Amicus Curiae Brief for the American Psychiatric Association, et al.). "As already observed [by the majority], the ADA is not reasonably read to impel States to phase out institutions, placing patients in need of close care at risk... 'Each disabled person is entitled to treatment in the most integrated setting possible for that person—recognizing on a case-by-case basis, that setting may be an institution'[quoting VOR's Amici Curiae brief]."

Justice Kennedy noted in his concurring opinion, "It would be unreasonable, it would be a tragic event, then, were the Americans with Disabilities Act of 1990 (ADA) to be interpreted so that states had some incentive, for fear of litigation to drive those in need of medical care and treatment out of appropriate care and into settings with too little assistance and supervision."

The Supreme Court did not reach the question of whether there is a constitutional right to community services in the most integrated setting.

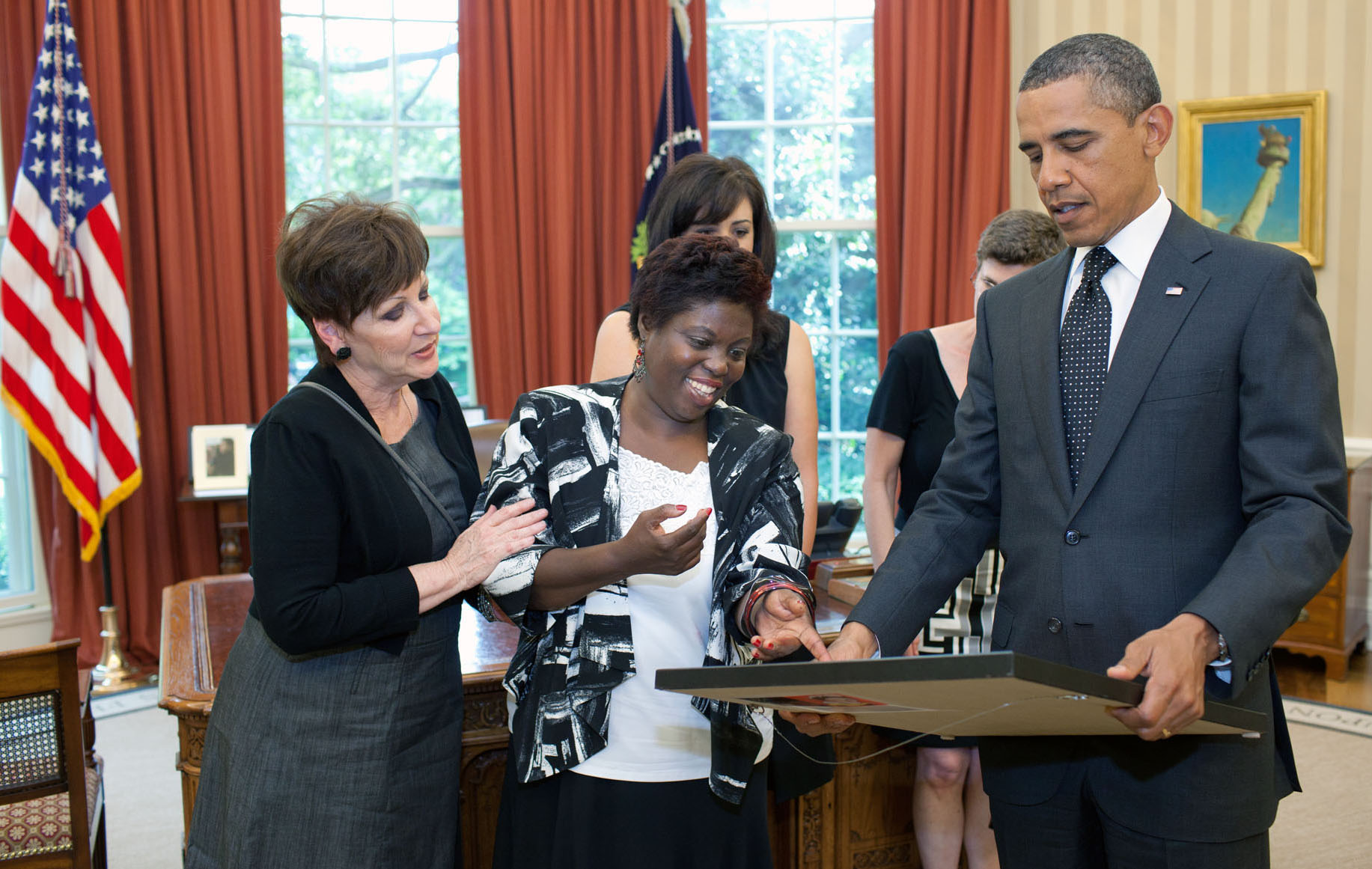
Lois Curtis, the plaintiff in Olmstead v. L.C., (center) presents President Barack Obama with a self-portrait of herself as a child that she painted. Joining them are, from left, Janet Hill and Jessica Long, from the Georgia Department of Labor, and Lee Sanders, of Briggs and Associates. The Oval Office, June 20, 2011

About ten years after the Olmstead decision, the State of Georgia and the United States Department of Justice entered a settlement agreement to cease all admissions of individuals with developmental disabilities to state-operated, federally licensed institutions ("State Hospitals") and, by July 1, 2015, "transition all individuals with developmental disabilities in the State Hospitals from the Hospitals to community settings," according to a Department of Justice Fact Sheet about the settlement. The settlement also calls for serving 9,000 individuals with mental illness in community settings. Recently, the federal court's Independent Reviewer for the settlement found significant health and safety risks, including many deaths, harming former State Hospital residents due to their transition from a licensed facility home to community-settings per the settlement. The Court has approved a moratorium on such transfers until the safety of those impacted can be assured.

== 2020s ==
In 2024, 16 Republican Attorneys General filed Texas v. Kennedy which challenged a rule by the Biden administration which added gender dysphoria to the definition of disability and the integration mandate. After the second inauguration of Donald Trump, 9 Republican Attorneys General filed an amended complaint challenging only the integration mandate.

In July 2025, Trump signed Executive Order 14321 which promoted "civil commitment" and signed the One Big Beautiful Bill Act, cutting over a trillion dollars from Medicaid and the Children’s Health Insurance Program. In 2024, in City of Grants Pass v. Johnson, the Supreme Court allowed criminalizing homelessness.

In June 2026, during the second Trump presidency, the Office of Legal Counsel, driven by Stephen Miller, released an opinion "that Congress has not imposed an integration mandate on states".

== In media ==
Several documentary films and educational media projects have examined the legacy and implementation of Olmstead v. L.C..

- I Am Olmstead (2014) is a public education and storytelling project created by the Atlanta Legal Aid Society featuring videos, StoryCorps interviews, and first-person accounts of individuals whose lives were affected by the Olmstead decision.
- The Promise of Olmstead: 15 Years Later (2014) is a short documentary produced by the United States Department of Justice commemorating the fifteenth anniversary of the decision through interviews with disability rights advocates, people with disabilities, and public officials.
- 6,000 Waiting (2021) is a documentary directed by Michael Joseph McDonald examining the continuing implementation of Olmstead and access to community-based services in Georgia.

== See also ==
- ADA Litigation in the United States
- Jarvis hearings
- List of United States Supreme Court cases, volume 527
- List of United States Supreme Court cases
- Lists of United States Supreme Court cases by volume
