= Robert Provan =

American lawyer (1944–2006)

Robert James Provan (September 14, 1944 – July 6, 2006) was an attorney at law who practiced in Texas and is most noted for his bringing the first lawsuit of its kind in the United States against an HMO on behalf of physician's using the Americans with Disabilities Act of 1990 that the Wall Street Journal said was poised to become a major test case and whose rulings have been cited in other cases.

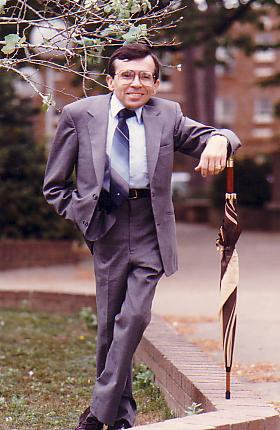
Robert, J. Provan

== Early life and education ==
Provan was born on September 14, 1944, in Vernon, Texas, to James W. Provan Sr. and Alice Louise Provan (née Furr) who shortly after his birth moved to Chicago, Illinois. At the age of 5, Provan contracted polio, which left him paralyzed below the neck. Provan was in Chicago Children's Memorial hospital from age 5 to age 10. He had a ground breaking surgery, performed by Dr. Charles Peas, that removed part of his ankle bone and infused it into his spine. His ankle bone was replaced with ivory. He then moved to Texas and graduated from Irving High School in Irving, Texas, he then attended Slippery Rock University of Pennsylvania where he received his BS of Political Science. He then attended the University of Texas School of Law and received his Doctorage of Jurisprudence degree. On December 19, 1974, Provan was admitted to the State Bar of Texas.

== Career ==
He served as an assistant attorney general for the State of Texas. He also served as general counsel for Stephen F. Austin University. Provan started his own law firm, Provan & Associates, which was active until shortly before his death. Provan was an honorary speaker for the National Rights to Life Convention.

== Zamora-Quezada v. HealthTexas Medical Group ==
In 1996, Provan, while having lunch with attorneys from the Texas Medical Association, learned that doctors were being dropped from their HMO contracts because of their treating chronically ill patients, which the HMOs said was too expensive. Provan then proposed a never before used tactic against these HMOs, suggesting to these attorneys that they sue these HMOs under the Americans with Disabilities Act of 1990 and positing: "Can you think of a more important relationship that a person with a disability has, than the one he has with his physician?" With the backing of the Texas Medical Association, and a powerful group of private attorneys, Provan, in 1998, filed his first-of-a-kind lawsuit against five HMO's under the ADA (Zamora-Quezada v. HealthTexas Medical Group, 34 F. Supp. 2d 433 (W.D. Tex. 1998)) on behalf of 10 HMO members who claimed the HMOs made it hard for them to see doctors. In 1999, these HMOs sought to dismiss Provan's lawsuit, but a federal court ruled against them, and the case was settled out of court. Many decisions relating to Provan's unique lawsuit against these HMOs have been cited in other court cases since.

== Death ==
Robert Provan died on July 6, 2006. He developed post-polio complications. He was buried in Lindale, Texas by his only child, Michelle Provan.

== Legacy ==
In 2007, Provan Opportunity Center, a school that serves to intervene socially, emotionally, and academically to help students find their way. The school was opened by Pflugerville Independent School District after recognizing Provan as a "champion of rights for the disabled." A plaque is located inside Irving High School recognizing his achievement as the only student voted class president twice. The Stephen Fuller Austin Statue on the campus of Stephen F. Austin State University's Library Plaza has Provan's name engraved on it, among with other names.
