= Lois Curtis =

American disability rights activist (1967–2022)

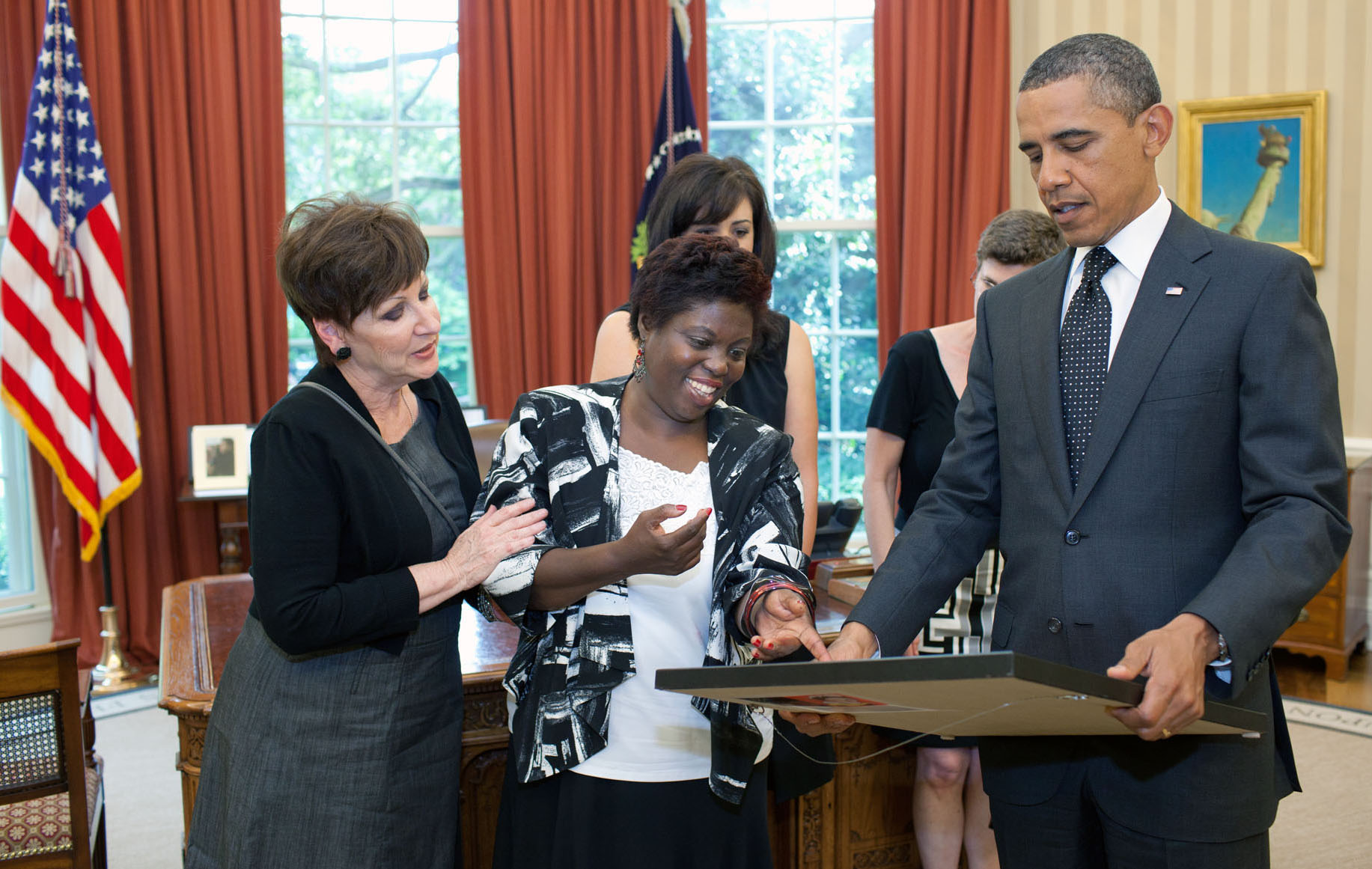
- Curtis (middle) with President Barack Obama in 2011
- Born: July 14, 1967; Atlanta, Georgia, U.S.
- Died: November 3, 2022 (aged 55); Clarkston, Georgia, U.S.
- Occupation: Artist
- Known for: Disability rights activism

Lois Jeanette Curtis (14 July 1967 – 3 November 2022) was an American artist and the lead plaintiff in the United States Supreme Court case that became known as the Olmstead Decision in which the court held that the unjustified segregation of people with disabilities was discriminatory, and a breach of the Americans with Disabilities Act.

== Early life ==
Curtis was born on July 14, 1967, in Atlanta, Georgia. Her mother was Mae (née Traylor) Curtis Keith, and worked as a housekeeper; her father was Melvin Lewis Curtis, who worked as a truck driver. She had two sisters, Bobbie Jean Cloud and Patricia Cook.

Curtis grew up with cognitive and developmental disabilities, both of which interrupted her schooling and created challenges for her family. As such, she often walked away from school resulting in her being incarcerated in jails and psychiatric hospitals, including as a temporary inpatient at the child and adolescent mental health unit of Georgia Regional Hospital. In total, she spent just under twenty years in institutions, from the age of eleven years.

== The Olmstead Decision ==
Curtis, along with fellow patient Elaine Wilson, sued the state of Georgia, ultimately leading to the landmark Supreme Court decision Olmstead v. L.C. On June 22, 1999, the court held that the unjustified segregation of people with disabilities was an act of discrimination, as defined by the Americans with Disabilities Act. Justice Ruth Bader Ginsburg ruled that:

"confinement in an institution severely diminishes the everyday life activities of individuals, including family relations, social contacts, work options, economic independence, educational advancement and cultural enrichment."

The Supreme Court case followed a 1995 federal court case brought by the Atlanta Legal Aid Society who filed the case against Tommy Olmstead, the commissioner of human services for the State of Georgia, demanding that he transfer Curtis out of an institution and into community-based care. At the time, Curtis was aged 26 years. The court held in favor of the Atlanta Legal Aid Society, but the state of Georgia appealed to the Supreme Court.

The Supreme Court case became known as the Olmstead Decision and it changed the way that services are provided to people with disabilities, away from providing care in institutions towards care in the community.

== Advocacy and career ==
In addition to being an advocate for the rights of people with disabilities, Curtis worked as an artist using pastels and acrylic portraits. On June 20, 2011, Curtis met Barack Obama at the White House and gave him one of her paintings.

== Personal life and death ==
After the Olmstead decision, Curtis began to live in the community. She had a professional aide and a 'micro board,' a group of people that helped her to meet her goals. When asked about her life in 2014, she said, "Well, I make grits, eggs, and sausage in the morning and sweep the floor. I go out to eat sometimes. I take art classes. I draw pretty pictures and make money. I go out of town and sell me artwork. I go to church and pray to the Lord. I raise my voice high! In the summer I go to the pool and put my feet in the water. Maybe I’ll learn to swim someday. I been fishing. I seen a pig and a horse on a farm. I buy clothes and shoes. I have birthday parties. They a lot of fun. I’m not afraid of big dogs no more. I feel good about myself. My life a better life."

Curtis died of pancreatic cancer at home in Clarkston, Georgia, on November 3, 2022, at the age of 55.
