= ADA Amendments Act of 2008 =

US law, amended the Americans with Disabilities Act of 1990

- Long title: An act to restore the intent and protections of the Americans with Disabilities Act of 1990
- Acronyms (colloquial): ADAAA
- Enacted by: the 110th United States Congress

Citations
- Public law: Pub. L. 110–325 (text) (PDF)

Codification
- Acts amended: Americans with Disabilities Act of 1990
- Titles amended: 42 U.S.C.: Public Health and Social Welfare
- U.S.C. sections amended: 42 U.S.C. ch. 126 § 12101 et seq.

Legislative history
- Introduced in the Senate as S.3406 by Tom Harkin (D-IA) on July 31, 2008; Passed the Senate on September 11, 2008 (Unanimous consent); Passed the House on September 17, 2008 (Voice vote); Signed into law by President George W. Bush on September 25, 2008

The ADA Amendments Act of 2008 (Public Law 110–325, ADAAA) is an Act of Congress, effective January 1, 2009, that amended the Americans with Disabilities Act of 1990 (ADA) and other disability nondiscrimination laws at the Federal level of the United States.

Passed on September 17, 2008, and signed into law by President George W. Bush on September 25, 2008, the ADAAA was a response to a number of decisions by the Supreme Court that had interpreted the original text of the ADA. Because members of the U.S. Congress viewed those decisions as limiting the rights of persons with disabilities, the ADAAA effectively reversed those decisions by changing the law. It also rejected portions of the regulations published by the Equal Employment Opportunity Commission (EEOC) that interpret Title I (the employment-related title) of the ADA. The ADAAA makes changes to the definition of the term "disability," clarifying and broadening that definition—and therefore the number and types of persons who are protected under the ADA and other Federal disability nondiscrimination laws. It was designed to strike a balance between employer and employee interests.

The ADAAA requires that courts interpreting the ADA and other Federal disability nondiscrimination laws focus on whether the covered entity has discriminated, rather than whether the individual seeking the law's protection has an impairment that fits within the technical definition of the term "disability." The Act retains the ADA's basic definition of "disability" as an impairment that substantially limits one or more major life activities; a record of such an impairment; or being regarded as having such an impairment. However, it changes the way that the statutory terms should be interpreted.

== Reasons for enactment ==
U.S. Congress used the functional definition of disability from Section 504 of the Rehabilitation Act of 1973. Due to 17 years of development through case law, Congress believed the requirements of the definition were well understood. Within the framework established under the Rehabilitation Act, courts treated the determination of disability as a threshold issue, but focused primarily on whether unlawful discrimination had occurred. After the passage of the ADA, the focus of court decisions shifted to deciding if people's claims of discrimination were protected by the law.

Congress passed the ADA Amendments Act of 2008 to overturn two controversial court decisions based on interpretations of the ADA. The first decision—by the Supreme Court in Sutton v. United Air Lines, Inc.—stated that impairments must be considered in their mitigated state. The second decision in Toyota Motor Manufacturing, Kentucky, Inc. v. Williams narrowed the definition of "disability" to just those impairments that impact tasks of daily living. In following these decisions, lower courts would frequently focus on whether the plaintiff was, in fact, disabled and never reach the issue of whether discrimination had occurred.

Through these rulings, the Supreme Court and lower courts created a situation in which an individual with a physical or mental impairment severe enough to constitute a "substantially limiting a major life activity" under case law based on the Rehabilitation Act did not qualify for protection under the ADA. These included individuals with impairments such as amputation, intellectual disabilities, epilepsy, multiple sclerosis, HIV/AIDS, diabetes, muscular dystrophy, and cancer.

== Push for changes ==
In 2004, the National Council on Disability, an independent Federal agency charged with making recommendations to the President and Congress, issued a report called "Righting the ADA." This report detailed various ways that the courts had misinterpreted Congressional intent and limited the reach of the ADA, and proposed legislative language to restore that intent. The most important misinterpretation the report identified was the narrowing of the ADA's definition of "disability" to exclude many individuals that Congress intended to protect from discrimination.

Over the course of 2006, the Consortium for Citizens with Disabilities (CCD) worked to develop consensus within the disability rights community regarding the strategy and substance of a bill that would fix the definition problem. On September 29, 2006, the last working day of the 109th Congress, Representative Jim Sensenbrenner (R-WI), then Chair of the United States House Committee on the Judiciary, and then-Minority Leader Steny Hoyer (D-MD) introduced H.R. 6258 ("ADA Restoration Act of 2006") to "restore the intent of the Americans with Disabilities Act of 1990 to more fully remove the barriers that confront disabled Americans." The bill represented an important first step towards reform but was rejected by the committee.

On July 26, 2007, the 17th anniversary of the ADA's passage, Majority Leader Hoyer, Representative Sensenbrenner, and Senators Tom Harkin (D-IA) and Arlen Specter (R-PA) introduced companion "ADA restoration" bills (H.R. 3195; S. 1881) that closely tracked a draft bill produced by the CCD and Congressional staff. On the day of the introduction of H.R. 3195, the bill had 143 co-sponsors in the House. Despite the number of House co-sponsors of the legislation, the business community and the Justice Department urged Members of Congress to oppose the ADA Restoration Act. Concerned that a partisan battle would damage the traditionally bi-partisan base of support for disability rights legislation, Congressional champions of the bill, including Majority Leader Hoyer, encouraged the disability community to meet with the business community and negotiate bill language that both communities would agree to defend through the entire legislative process.

== Negotiations ==
The coalition of advocates from the business and disability communities that spearheaded the efforts to pass the ADAAA first came together on February 19, 2008. That initial group consisted of representatives from the American Association of People with Disabilities (AAPD), the National Council on Independent Living (NCIL), the Bazelon Center for Mental Health Law, the National Disabilities Rights Network (NDRN), the Epilepsy Foundation (EF), the United States Chamber of Commerce, the Society for Human Resource Management (SHRM), the National Association of Manufacturers (NAM), and the HR Policy Association (HR Policy). Each group entered the negotiations by signing a document indicating its understanding that any agreement reached would be defended and maintained by all of the groups. Modifications and amendments to the draft bill were permitted only by mutual agreement.

The negotiating group met almost weekly from February through May 2008. Both the disability and business negotiators consistently checked back with a much broader group of disability and business advocates throughout the process. The key negotiators for the disability group were Andy Imparato (AAPD); Sandy Finucane (EF); Chai Feldblum (Georgetown Law, on behalf of EF); Jennifer Mathis (Bazelon Center for Mental Health Law); John Lancaster (NICL); and Curt Decker (NDRN). Former Representative Tony Coelho and Nancy Zirkin from the Leadership Conference on Civil Rights also provided political counsel throughout the process. The business negotiators were led by Mike Eastman and Randal Johnson (Chamber), assisted by Larry Lorber (Proskauer Rose); Mike Aitken and Mike Layman (SHRM); Mike Peterson (HR Policy); and Jeri Gillepsie (NAM). Tim Bartl (HR Policy) and Camille Olson (Seyfarth Shaw) also provided political and legal counsel to the business negotiators. Cheryl Sensenbrenner, board chair of AAPD, was involved throughout the process.

The negotiating group reached a final agreement on May 13, 2008. That agreement formed the basis for a Congressional agreement and substitute to the earlier version of H.R. 3195. The substitute was renamed the ADA Amendments Act of 2008 (ADAAA). H.R. 3195 subsequently passed by wide margins in the House Education and Labor Committee and the House Judiciary Committee, and passed the House of Representatives on June 25, 2008, by a vote of 402 Ayes, 17 Nays, 15 Present/Not Voting.

The coalition was tested in July 2008 when Senators Tom Harkin and Orrin Hatch proposed a new definition of "substantially limits." Representatives from the disability and business communities came back together to find a compromise that would address the Senators' concern. They reached a new resolution that dropped the definition of "substantially limits" entirely—replacing it with additional findings and purposes.

This agreement became the basis of S. 3406, which passed the Senate by unanimous consent on September 11, 2008. The House of Representatives followed suit one week later, and the President signed the ADAAA into the law on September 25, 2008.

For a full list of the many individuals and groups who worked on the ADAAA, from the disability, civil rights, and business communities, see the Statement by Majority Leader Hoyer on September 17, 2008.

== Significant changes ==
The ADAAA explicitly overturns the controversial Supreme Court decisions in Sutton and Toyota, rejecting the high standards imposed on claimants by the Court in those cases, and reiterates that Congress intends that the scope of the ADA be broad and inclusive. The ADAAA retains the ADA's definition of disability as a physical or mental impairment that substantially limits one or more life activities; a record of such impairment; or being regarded as having such impairment. However, it clarifies and expands the definition's meaning and application in the following ways:

First, the ADAAA deletes two findings in the ADA that led the Supreme Court to restrict the meaning and application of the definition of disability. These findings were that "some 43,000,000 Americans have one or more physical or mental disabilities" and that "individuals with disabilities are a discrete and insular minority." The Court had treated these findings as limiting how other provisions of the ADA should be construed.

Second, the law provides that the definition of disability "shall be construed in favor of broad coverage of individuals under this Act, to the maximum extent permitted by the terms of this Act." It retains the terms "substantially limits" and "major life activities" from the original ADA definition of "disability," but makes clear that Congress intended the terms to impose less- demanding standards than those enunciated by the Supreme Court in the Toyota case. It also states that the EEOC's regulatory definition of "substantially limits" was overly strict.

Third, the law prohibits consideration of mitigating measures such as medication, assistive technology, accommodations, or modifications when determining whether an impairment substantially limits a major life activity. The related text of the ADAAA explicitly rejects the Supreme Court's holdings in Sutton and its companion cases that mitigating measures must be considered in determining whether an impairment constitutes a disability under the law. The ADAAA also provides that impairments that are episodic or in remission must be assessed according to their active state.

Fourth, the law provides additional direction on the "major life activities" that must be substantially limited for an impairment to be a disability: the Act lists specific examples of major life activities, rather than leaving that phrase open to interpretation, as the ADA of 1990 did. The non-exhaustive list of major life activities in § 4(4)(a) of the amended ADA includes caring for oneself, performing manual tasks, seeing, hearing, eating, sleeping, walking, standing, lifting, bending, speaking, breathing, learning, reading, concentrating, thinking, communicating and working. The ADAAA also lists major bodily functions, including, but not limited to, functions of the immune system; normal cell growth; and digestive, bowel, bladder, neurological, brain, respiratory, circulatory, endocrine, and reproductive functions.

Fifth, the law removes from the "regarded as" prong of the disability definition (the third prong of the definition) the requirement that an individual demonstrate that the impairment that he or she has, or is perceived to have, limits a major life activity in a way that is perceived to be substantial. Under the ADAAA, therefore, an individual can establish coverage under the law by showing that he or she has been subjected to an action prohibited under the Act because of an actual or perceived physical or mental impairment that is not transitory and minor. The law also explicitly states that although individuals who fall solely under the "regarded as" prong of the definition of disability are protected from discrimination, entities covered by the ADA are not required to provide accommodations, or to modify policies and procedures, for such persons.

Sixth, the law clarifies that the authority granted to three specific Federal agencies to issue regulations interpreting the ADA includes the authority to issue regulations implementing the definitions contained in Sections 3 and 4 of that Act.

Finally, the ADAAA makes conforming amendments Section 7 of the Rehabilitation Act of 1973, and to Title I of the ADA itself. To conform the employment-related provisions of the ADA with parallel provisions of Title VII of the Civil Rights Act of 1964, the latter amendments change the language of Title I to provide that no covered entity shall discriminate against a qualified individual "on the basis of disability."

To summarize the ADAAA timeline: the Act was introduced on July 31, 2008; passed the Senate on September 11, 2008; passed the House on September 17, 2008; was signed by the President on September 25, 2008; and took effect on January 1, 2009.

The United States Court of Appeals for the District of Columbia Circuit held on July 21, 2009, that the ADAAA does not apply retroactively.

== Legislative history ==
- S. 3406
  - CONGRESSIONAL RECORD, Vol. 154 (2008):
    - Jul. 28, introduced in Senate and placed on Senate calendar
    - Sept. 11, considered and passed Senate.
    - Sept. 17, considered and passed House.

== See also ==
- Equal Employment Opportunity Commission (EEOC)
- ADA Litigation in the United States
