= Campbell v. General Dynamics Government Systems Corp. =

Campbell v. General Dynamics Gov't Sys. Corp.
- Court: United States Court of Appeals for the First Circuit
- Full case name: Roderick Campbell v. General Dynamics Government Systems Corporation and Richard T. Schnorbus
- Decided: May 23, 2005
- Citation: 407 F.3d 546 (1st Cir. 2005)

Case history
- Prior history: 321 F. Supp. 2d 142 (D. Mass., 2004)

Court membership
- Judges sitting: Bruce M. Selya, Kermit Lipez, Jeffrey R. Howard

Case opinions
- Majority: Selya, joined by Howard
- Concurrence: Lipez

In Campbell v. General Dynamics Gov't Sys. Corp., 407 F.3d 546 (1st Cir. 2005), the First Circuit had to consider the enforceability of a mandatory arbitration agreement, contained in a dispute resolution policy linked to an e-mailed company-wide announcement, insofar as it applies to employment discrimination claims brought under the Americans with Disabilities Act. Under the Court's analysis, the question turned on whether the employer provided minimally sufficient notice of the contractual nature of the e-mailed policy and of the concomitant waiver of an employee's right to access a judicial forum. The Court weighed the attendant circumstances; concluded that the notice was wanting and that, therefore, enforcement of the waiver would be inappropriate; and upheld the district court's denial of the employer's motion to stay proceedings and compel the employee to submit his claim to arbitration.

The case is a principal case in the Rothstein, Liebman employment law casebook.

== Background ==
An employee filed an Americans with Disabilities Act (ADA) claim, alleging that the employer terminated him because of sleep apnea. Previously, the company had announced a new dispute resolution policy that required discrimination claims to be submitted to arbitration. It announced the policy in a company-wide email; the text was accessed by links in the e-mail.

The United States District Court for the District of Massachusetts struck the defendant's affirmative defense and denied its motion to stay proceedings and to compel plaintiff employee to submit to arbitration his claim under the Americans with Disabilities Act, 42 U.S.C.S. §§ 12101-12213.

== Opinion of the court ==
The First Circuit affirmed the decision of the lower court. The court had no jurisdiction to review an interlocutory order granting the employee's motion to strike the affirmative defense under the Federal Arbitration Act, 9 U.S.C.S. §§ 1-16. The court affirmed the denial of the employer's motion to stay and to compel arbitration. Enforcement of the arbitration policy was not appropriate because the e-mail did not provide minimally sufficient notice to a reasonably prudent employee of the contractual nature of the e-mailed policy and the concomitant waiver of the employee's right to access a judicial forum. The court held that the mass e-mail, which did not require an affirmative response but requested the recipient to review the materials, was not a traditional means for conveying contractually binding terms of employment and did not state directly that the policy contained a mandatory arbitration agreement that would become the employee's exclusive remedy for all claims.
