= Individual rights advocate =

Advocate

An Individual rights advocate is an advocate "to protect the legal and human rights of individuals with disabilities." United States law provides for advocates to protect the legal rights of persons with disabilities. This advocacy can be life-changing:

Over the last 25 years, disability rights advocacy has played a crucial role in broadening the concept of disability and of what people with disabilities can accomplish. This advocacy has been instrumental in shaping new images of people with disabilities. In emphasizing individual independence and empowerment since the beginning of the disability rights movement in the early 1970s, advocates have tried to show that people with disabilities are a vital part of society and have the right to participate fully in it.

— Emily Powell

There are some writers who feel that, "only individuals have rights," rather than groups.

== See also ==
- ADA Compliance Kit
- American Disability rights movement
- Accessibility
- Developmental disability
- List of disability rights activists
- List of anti-discrimination acts
  - Disability discrimination act
- Paralegal
- Victimology
