= Darrin P. Gayles =

American judge (born 1966)

Darrin Gayles
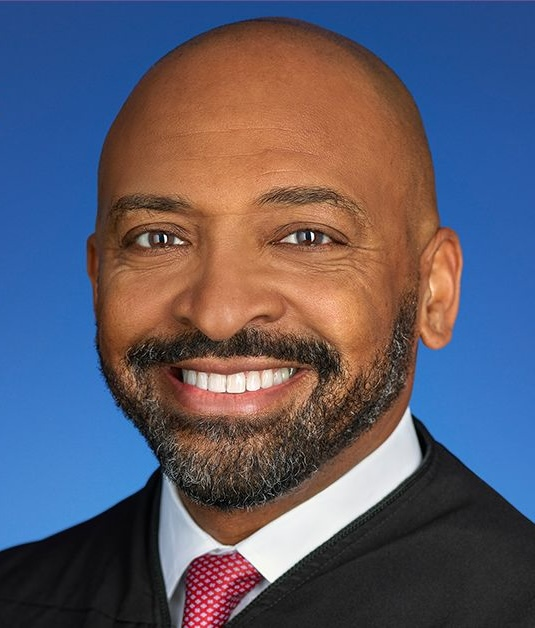

Judge of the United States District Court for the Southern District of Florida
- Incumbent
- Assumed office June 19, 2014
- Appointed by: Barack Obama
- Preceded by: Patricia A. Seitz

Personal details
- Born: Darrin Phillip Gayles; 1966 (age 59–60) Peoria, Illinois, U.S.
- Education: Howard University (BA); George Washington University (JD)

Darrin Phillip Gayles (born 1966) is a United States district judge of the United States District Court for the Southern District of Florida and former Florida Circuit Court judge.

== Education and legal career ==
Gayles received a Bachelor of Arts degree in 1990 from Howard University. He received a Juris Doctor in 1993 from the George Washington University Law School. He began his career as an assistant state attorney in the Miami-Dade State Attorney's Office from 1993 to 1997. From 1997 to 1999, he served as an assistant district counsel at the United States Immigration and Naturalization Service. From 1999 to 2004, he served as an assistant United States attorney for the Southern District of Florida.

== Judicial career ==
=== State judicial service ===
In 2004, Gayles became a judge, serving as a county judge in Miami-Dade County within the Eleventh Judicial Circuit. From 2011 to 2014, he served as a circuit court judge on the Eleventh Judicial Circuit Court of Florida.

=== Federal judicial service ===
On February 6, 2014, President Barack Obama nominated Gayles to serve as a United States District Judge of the United States District Court for the Southern District of Florida, to the seat vacated by Judge Patricia A. Seitz, who assumed senior status on November 16, 2012. He received a hearing before the United States Senate Judiciary Committee on April 1, 2014. On May 8, 2014, his nomination was reported out of committee by a voice vote. On June 16, 2014, the United States Senate invoked cloture by a 55–37 vote. On June 17, 2014, his nomination was confirmed by a 98–0 vote, making him the first openly gay African-American federal judge. He received his judicial commission on June 19, 2014.

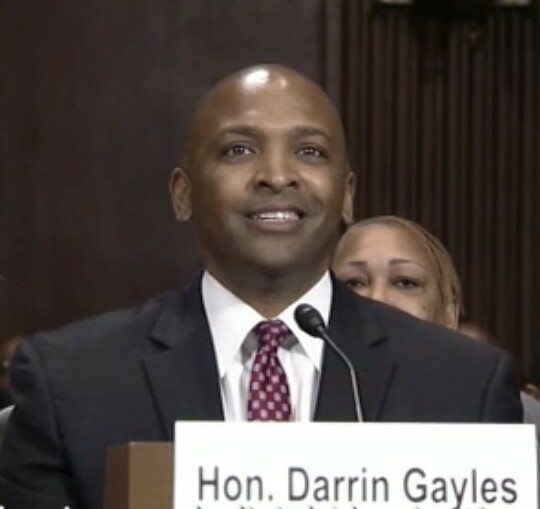
Darrin P. Gayles U.S. Senate Judiciary Committee hearing

=== Cases ===
Sitting with the Eleventh Circuit in July 2020, Gayles dissented when the court upheld an Alabama voter ID law without a trial even though evidence showed that voters of color were twice as likely to lack ID as white voters. Gayles wrote "The majority opinion essentially argues that we should not penalize Alabama’s legislators for Alabama’s past; rather, we should start with a clean slate when reviewing the Photo ID Law. But this is not what the law commands us to do. Alabama’s history of voter suppression is relevant here and provides a wealth of direct and circumstantial evidence that should be considered at trial."

In 2025, Gayles was assigned Donald Trump's lawsuit against The Wall Street Journal and Rupert Murdoch after the WSJ ran a story on an alleged letter Trump wrote to sex offender Jeffrey Epstein for his 50th birthday. In April 2026, Gayles dismissed the lawsuit citing a failure to "adequately allege actual malice".

== See also ==
- List of African-American federal judges
- List of African-American jurists
- List of first minority male lawyers and judges in the United States
- List of first minority male lawyers and judges in Florida
- List of LGBT jurists in the United States

Legal offices
Preceded by Patricia A. Seitz	Judge of the United States District Court for the Southern District of Florida; 2014–present	Incumbent
