= Paralyzed Veterans of America v. Ellerbe Becket Architects and Engineers =

American disability rights court case

- Court: United States District Court
- Full case name: Paralyzed Veterans of America v. Ellerbe Becket Architects and Engineers
- Citation: 117 F.3d 579

Keywords
- ADA, wheelchair accessibility, sight lines

Paralyzed Veterans of America v. Ellerbe Becket Architects and Engineers (PVA 1996) was one of the first major Americans with Disabilities Act (ADA) lawsuits. The case focused on the wheelchair accessibility of a stadium project that was still in the design phase, the MCI Center (now known as Capital One Arena) in Washington, D.C.

== Background ==
Before this case, the ADA had been in effect for only five years. During that time, the United States Department of Justice had not provided clarification on the distribution requirements for accessible wheelchair locations in large assembly spaces, either because they were unable or unwilling to do so. Section 4.33.3 of ADAAG refers to lines of sight, but does not specifically mention viewing over standing patrons. The MCI Center, designed by Ellerbe Becket Architects & Engineers, was found to have too few wheelchair and companion seats, and the ones that were included did not provide sight lines that would enable the wheelchair user to view the playing area while the spectators in front of them were standing.

== Significance ==
This case together with a related case, U.S. v. Ellerbe Becket, Inc, established a precedent on seat distribution and sight line issues for ADA enforcement. These rulings provided clarity on the requirements for accessible wheelchair seating in large assembly spaces, ensuring that spectators in wheelchairs have an unobstructed view of the playing area, even when other patrons are standing. Specifically, in the U.S. v. Ellerbe Becket case, the court reinforced the importance of equal access and sight lines for wheelchair users in public accommodations. This precedent continues to impact ADA enforcement to the present day.
