= Michigan Paralyzed Veterans of America v. The University of Michigan =

Michigan Paralyzed Veterans of America v. The University of Michigan was a case filed before the United States District Court for the Eastern District of Michigan Southern Division. The case was brought on behalf of the Michigan Paralyzed Veterans of America (MPVA) against the University of Michigan, alleging that the $226-million renovation of Michigan Stadium violated the Americans with Disabilities Act (ADA) by not providing adequate seating, restrooms, concessions, and parking for disabled fans.

== Background ==
The MPVA claimed that Michigan Stadium did not provide enough seats for disabled fans or adequately accommodate their needs for disabled restrooms, concessions, and parking during its renovation. Furthermore, the distribution of accessible seating was a point of contention, as almost all seats were located in the end-zone areas. The U.S. Department of Justice (DOJ) supported the MPVA in the suit, which was filed by attorney Richard Bernstein of the Law Offices of Sam Bernstein in Farmington Hills, Michigan.

== Settlement ==
The case was settled in March 2008. The settlement required Michigan Stadium to add 329 wheelchair seats throughout the stadium by 2010, as well as an additional 135 accessible seats in clubhouses, in addition to the existing 88 wheelchair seats.

== Significance ==
This case was significant for several reasons. First, it set a precedent for the uniform distribution of accessible seating in stadiums. Second, it provided the DOJ with an opportunity to clarify previously unclear ADA regulations. Finally, the settlement now serves as a blueprint for stadiums and other public facilities to ensure accessibility.
