= Job Accommodation Network =

Service provided by the US Department of Labor

Job Accommodation Network (JAN)
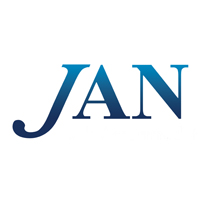

Background Information
- Founded: 1983
- Purpose: Technical assistance related to accommodating people with disabilities in the workplace, including information about entrepreneurship
- Audience: Employers, rehabilitation/medical professions, people with disabilities, and their friends/families/coworkers

Contact Information
- Website: http://AskJAN.org
- Phone: (800)526-7234
- TTY: (877)781-9403
- Email: JANonDemand
- YouTube: https://www.youtube.com/user/JANinformation
- Contact Page: https://AskJAN.org/contact-us.cfm

The Job Accommodation Network (JAN) is a service provided by the United States Department of Labor's Office of Disability Employment Policy (ODEP). JAN is one of several ODEP technical assistance centers. JAN facilitates the employment and retention of workers with disabilities by providing employers, employment providers, people with disabilities, their family members, and other interested parties with information on job accommodations, entrepreneurship, and related subjects. JAN's efforts are in support of the employment, including self-employment and small business ownership, of people with disabilities.

== History ==
The network has been located on the campus of West Virginia University since its inception in 1983. It began with two consultants providing accommodation information over two telephone lines with no computers. At that time, JAN served only employers seeking accommodation information. Because of additional demand for its confidential, direct, and no-cost service, JAN quickly expanded beyond providing information to employers to include rehabilitation and educational professionals, individuals with disabilities, and anyone else interested in workplace accommodations.

Initially, JAN consulted primarily on sensory disabilities, those involving hearing, vision, touch, or speech impairments. Until the early 1990s, about 30 percent of JAN's requests addressed these disability areas. As computers, office machines, cell phones, wireless communication, and similar technology became common in workplaces, employees with all types of impairments needed to be able to use the technology. As caller questions became more technical, JAN consultants changed to a team approach, dividing into motor / mobility, sensory, and cognitive / neurological teams. A team approach allowed consultants to handle increasing case loads, yet stay current and knowledgeable about rapidly changing technology and products.

With the implementation of the Americans with Disabilities Act of 1990 (ADA) in 1992, more individuals began calling JAN and more cases focused on accommodating individuals with motor / mobility impairments. Prior to 1992, JAN averaged 630 accommodation inquiries per month. In 1992, cases soared to over 1,600 per month and continued to steadily rise throughout the 1990s, ending with an average of almost 3,000 per month. JAN now averages 53,000+ inquiries and 5,000,000 Website customers annually.

In 2000, the JAN staff was evaluated by WESTAT, an employee-owned research corporation serving agencies of the U.S. Government, as well as businesses, foundations, and state and local governments. JAN achieved recognition for achieving the highest score ever awarded by an outside evaluator.

== Services Provided ==
JAN's consultants, each with at least a master's degree in a specialized field, provide information on accommodations for all types of impairments, including sensory, motor, cognitive, and psychiatric conditions. Information is also available about rights and responsibilities under the Americans with Disabilities Act and related legislation. JAN continues to provide resources for veterans and returning wounded and injured military, including support for America's Heroes at Work.
