= Toyota Motor Manufacturing, Kentucky, Inc. v. Williams =

- Supreme Court of the United States

Argued November 7, 2001 Decided January 8, 2002
- Full case name: Toyota Motor Manufacturing, Kentucky, Incorporated, Petitioner v. Ella Williams
- Citations: 534 U.S. 184 (more) 122 S. Ct. 681; 151 L. Ed. 2d 615; 2002 U.S. LEXIS 400; 70 U.S.L.W. 4050; 12 Am. Disabilities Cas. (BNA) 993; 67 Cal. Comp. Cas 60; 200 A.L.R. Fed. 667; 2002 Cal. Daily Op. Service 149; 2002 Daily Journal DAR 197; 15 Fla. L. Weekly Fed. S 39

Case history
- Prior: Williams v. Toyota Motor Mfg., Kentucky, Inc., 224 F.3d 840 (6th Cir. 2000); cert. granted, 532 U.S. 970 (2001).

Court membership
- Chief Justice William Rehnquist Associate Justices John P. Stevens · Sandra Day O'Connor; Antonin Scalia · Anthony Kennedy; David Souter · Clarence Thomas; Ruth Bader Ginsburg · Stephen Breyer

Case opinion
- Majority: O'Connor, joined by unanimous

Laws applied
- Americans with Disabilities Act of 1990
- Superseded by
- ADA Amendments Act of 2008

Toyota Motor Manufacturing, Kentucky, Inc. v. Williams, 534 U.S. 184 (2002), was a case in which the Supreme Court of the United States interpreted the meaning of the phrase "substantially impairs" as used in the Americans with Disabilities Act of 1990. It reversed the decision by the Court of Appeals to grant a partial summary judgment in favor of the respondent, Ella Williams, that had qualified her inability to perform manual job-related tasks as a disability.

== Facts of case ==
The respondent, Ella Williams, an automobile assembly line worker, was first employed by the petitioner, Toyota Motor Manufacturing, Kentucky, Inc., at Toyota's automobile manufacturing plant in Georgetown, Kentucky, in 1990, where she worked on an assembly line using pneumatic tools. Eventually she began to experience pain in her hands, wrists and arms, for which she sought treatment and was diagnosed with bilateral carpal tunnel syndrome and bilateral tendinitis. Her personal physician placed her on certain restrictions regarding her movements, and Toyota assigned her to various alternative jobs to accommodate her limitations. When Williams missed work for medical reasons due to job-related tasks, she filed a claim under the Kentucky Workers’ Compensation Act. Ky. Rev. Stat. Ann. §342.0011 et seq. (1997 and Supp. 2000). This claim was settled between the parties, and Williams returned to work. However, she remained dissatisfied with Toyota's efforts to accommodate her work restrictions and brought an action in the United States District Court for the Eastern District of Kentucky claiming that Toyota had refused to accommodate her disability, a suit that was again settled, and she returned to work as a Quality Control Inspection Operations (QCIO) worker which involved the visual inspection of vehicles. Both parties agreed that she was able to perform these duties satisfactorily. However, in the fall of 1996, the job duties changed and Williams was required to perform some additional physical tasks, which caused Williams difficulty.

Although the parties disagree on the facts from this point on, in any case Williams was restricted by her physician from work of any kind; she was fired and eventually she sued her former employer for failing to accommodate her disability reasonably and for terminating her employment.

== Legal history ==
Williams claimed to be disabled and unable to perform her job at Toyota because of carpal tunnel syndrome and related problems. She successfully sued Toyota Motor Manufacturing, Kentucky, Inc. for failure to provide "reasonable accommodations" as required by the Americans with Disabilities Act of 1990 (ADA), 42 U.S.C. §12112(b)(5)(A). Upon Toyota's appeal, the District Court issued a summary judgment that the Williams' impairment did not qualify as a "disability" under the ADA because her disability did not "substantially limit" any "major life activity" §12102(2)(A), and that there was no evidence that she possessed a record of such disabilities.

Under ADA, a "major life activity" includes actions of daily living such as "walking, seeing, hearing, learning, and working", not limitations specific to job-related tasks.

The Sixth Circuit Court of Appeals reversed this summary judgment, ruling that Williams's impairments substantially limited her ability to perform manual tasks and considered this a limitation in a "major life activity". To demonstrate this disability, Williams showed that her manual disability extended to a "class" of manual activities that directly related to her ability to perform specific work tasks such as repetitive activities, the gripping of certain tools, and performing tasks while in a particular posture for extended time period. The court specifically disregarded evidence that she was able to perform personal care tasks and tasks involving household chores as irrelevant to its finding. It granted her a partial summary judgment that she was disabled under the ADA.

The case was appealed to the Supreme Court. Future Chief Justice John Roberts argued the case for petitioner Toyota.

== Decision ==
Writing for the court, Justice Sandra Day O'Connor issued the opinion.

The "major life activity" definition in evaluating the performance of manual tasks focuses the inquiry on whether Williams was unable to perform a range of tasks central to most people in carrying out the activities of daily living. The issue is not whether Williams was unable to perform her specific job tasks. Therefore, the determination of whether an impairment rises to the level of a disability is not limited to activities in the workplace solely, but rather to manual tasks in life in general. When the Supreme Court applied this standard, it found that the Court of Appeals had incorrectly determined the presence of a disability because it relied solely on her inability to perform specific manual work tasks which was insufficient in proving the presence of a disability. The Court of Appeals should have taken into account the evidence presented that Williams retained the ability to do personal tasks and household chores, such activities being the nature of tasks most people do in their daily lives, and placed too much emphasis on her job disability. Since the evidence showed that Williams was performing normal daily tasks, it ruled that the Court of Appeals erred when it found Williams to be disabled.

Therefore, the Court of Appeals’ judgment granting partial summary judgment to Williams was reversed and the case was remanded back to the District Court of Appeals for further deliberations consistent with the Supreme Court's opinion.

== See also ==
- ADA Litigation in the United States
- List of United States Supreme Court cases, volume 534
- List of United States Supreme Court cases
