= ADA Compliance Kit =

ADA Compliance Kits are put into hotels and hospitals to comply with the Americans with Disabilities Act. On average, over 25 million deaf and hard of hearing travelers will patronize the hotel and hospitality industry each year. In order to comply with the act, properties must provide these for use by these guests. The number of kits a hotel is required to have on hand is dependent on the number of rooms in the establishment.

== Common items ==
- TTY (Text Telephone)
- Door Beacon with LED Light
- Telephone Handset Amplifier
- Telephone Signaler
- Alarm clock with bed shaker
- Visual/Audio Smoke Detector
- ADA Compliance Sign
- Carrying Case
