= Patricia A. Seitz =

American judge (born 1946)

Patricia Ann Seitz

Senior Judge of the United States District Court for the Southern District of Florida
- Incumbent
- Assumed office November 16, 2012

Judge of the United States District Court for the Southern District of Florida
- In office October 1, 1998 – November 16, 2012
- Appointed by: Bill Clinton
- Preceded by: Stanley Marcus
- Succeeded by: Darrin P. Gayles

Personal details
- Born: 1946 (age 79–80) Washington, D.C., U.S.
- Education: Kansas State University (BA); Georgetown University (JD)

Patricia Ann Seitz (born 1946) is a senior United States district judge of the United States District Court for the Southern District of Florida.

== Education and career ==
Seitz was born in Washington, D.C., in 1946. Her father is Lieutenant General Richard J. Seitz, former commanding general of the 82nd Airborne Division and the XVIII Airborne Corps. She graduated from Kansas State University with a Bachelor of Arts degree in 1968, and from Georgetown University Law Center with a Juris Doctor in 1973. Seitz was a law clerk for Judge Charles Robert Richey of the United States District Court for the District of Columbia from 1973 to 1974. She was in private practice in Florida from 1974 to 1996, and was a part-time adjunct professor at the University of Miami from 1984 to 1988. Seitz served as president of the Florida Bar from 1993 to 1994; she was the first woman to hold that position. She served at director of the Office of Legal Counsel for the Office of National Drug Control Policy (part of the Executive Office of the President) from 1996 to 1997, during the Bill Clinton administration.

=== Federal judicial service ===
President Bill Clinton nominated Seitz to the United States District Court for the Southern District of Florida on May 22, 1998, to the seat vacated by Stanley Marcus. She was confirmed by the Senate on September 28, 1998, and she received her commission on October 1, 1998. She assumed senior status on November 16, 2012. Seitz continued to hear cases as late as 2024. As of April 29, 2026, Seitz appears to be inactive.

Legal offices
Preceded by Stanley Marcus	Judge of the United States District Court for the Southern District of Florida; 1998–2012	Succeeded by Darrin P. Gayles
