= Wilkinson v. Austin =

- Supreme Court of the United States

Argued March 30, 2005 Decided June 13, 2005
- Full case name: Wilkinson, Director, Ohio Department of Rehabilitation and Correction v. Austin et al.
- Citations: 545 U.S. 209 (more) 125 S. Ct. 2384; 162 L. Ed. 2d 174

Case history
- Prior: Ruling in favor of the prison inmate plaintiffs, 189 F. Supp. 2d 719 (N.D. Ohio 2002), as modified, 204 F. Supp. 2d 1024 (N.D. Ohio 2002), affirmed by the Sixth Circuit, 372 F.3d 346 (6th Cir. 2004); cert. granted, 543 U.S. ___ (2005).

Holding
- Ohio's procedures for assigning prisoners to its Supermax facility conform with procedural due process protections.

Court membership
- Chief Justice William Rehnquist Associate Justices John P. Stevens · Sandra Day O'Connor; Antonin Scalia · Anthony Kennedy; David Souter · Clarence Thomas; Ruth Bader Ginsburg · Stephen Breyer

Case opinion
- Majority: Kennedy, joined by unanimous

Laws applied
- U.S. Const. amend. XIV

Wilkinson v. Austin, 545 U.S. 209 (2005), is a United States Supreme Court case in which the Court held that while the Due Process Clause of the Fourteenth Amendment gives rise to a liberty interest in not being placed in a Supermax prison, Ohio's procedures for determining which prisoners should be placed there satisfied the requirements of due process.

== Background ==
The State of Ohio opened its Supermax facility, the Ohio State Penitentiary, in 1998 after a riot in one of its maximum security prisons. The OSP is more restrictive than a maximum security unit, a "highly restrictive form of solitary confinement". Inmates remain at OSP indefinitely, up to the maximum term of their sentences; if a prisoner is serving a life sentence, he may remain at OSP until he dies.

The Ohio prison system determines which inmates will be placed at the OSP Supermax in the following manner. When an inmate enters the prison system, he is assigned a numerical ranking based on his security risk, from 1 to 5. The higher number represents a greater security risk. Inmates assigned level 5 are placed at OSP. Initially, there were no criteria governing which inmates would be rated 5, and some inmates who did not, in fact, pose tremendous security risks nevertheless received ratings of 5. The Ohio prison system formulated criteria for classifying inmates in 1999 and again in 2002. Under the 2002 policy, inmates were classified either upon entry into the prison system or after certain conduct took place. A three-member committee convenes to review the inmate's file and hold a hearing. At least 48 hours before the hearing, the inmate is notified about the conduct that triggered the classification. The inmate may attend the hearing and offer "pertinent information" or objections to OSP placement, but he may not call witnesses. The committee may decline to recommend OSP placement, at which point the process terminates.

If, however, the committee does recommend placement in OSP, the committee reports its recommendation to the warden of the inmate's current prison or, if the review took place upon the prisoner's initial entry into the prison system, to another designated official. The warden may veto the recommendation, at which point the process also terminates. If the warden concurs, he provides a written explanation and forwards both his recommendation and the committee's to the Bureau of Classification, an agency of the Ohio prison system. The inmate may also submit written objections to the Bureau. The Bureau may also veto the committee's recommendation; if it does not, the inmate is transferred to OSP.

Inmates assigned to OSP are reviewed within 30 days of arriving there. If the reviewer determines that the inmate is not appropriately placed, the reviewer provides a written report to the warden at OSP. The warden forwards the report, along with his own report, to the Bureau. If the Bureau agrees with the recommendation, the inmate is transferred to a lower-security prison. Otherwise, he will remain at OSP for at least another year, at which time another such review will take place.

== Procedural history ==
Austin and other OSP inmates brought suit against officials of the Ohio prison system under 42 U.S.C. § 1983, alleging that Ohio's procedure for determining which inmates will be placed at OSP violates their Fourteenth Amendment due process rights. The United States District Court for the Northern District of Ohio held an eight-day trial at which it heard testimony from expert witnesses. It concluded that the inmates had a liberty interest protected by the Due Process Clause in not being assigned to OSP, and demanded that the Ohio prison system make significant substantive and procedural changes to the process by which it assigned inmates to OSP. The State appealed to the Sixth Circuit, which affirmed the procedural modifications but set aside the substantive modifications. As a result of the Sixth Circuit's ruling, Ohio prison officials were required to:

1. Furnish to the inmate before the hearing a list of all the grounds upon which OSP placement could be based, and were thus forbidden to rely on factors not on that list;
2. Allow the prisoner to make an oral or written statement to the committee, and call witnesses on his behalf in a manner consistent with prison security concerns;
3. Explain in greater detail after the hearing the reason for the committee's decision; and
4. Explain to the inmate, every six months, what conduct would allow the inmate to be removed from OSP placement.

The State of Ohio asked the U.S. Supreme Court to review the Sixth Circuit's decision, and it agreed to do so.

== Opinion of the Court ==
The Court first had to decide whether the prison inmates had a protected liberty interest in avoiding placement in OSP. In the Sixth Circuit, Ohio had taken the position that they did not. In the Supreme Court, however, Ohio conceded that they did. Of its own force, the Due Process Clause of the Fourteenth Amendment does not guarantee that state prisoners will not be placed in more restrictive conditions of confinement. However, individual state procedural guarantees may give rise to a protected liberty interest, as the Court had held in Sandin v. Conner, 515 U.S. 472 (1995). In Conner, the Court held that a protected liberty interest can arise only after examining the "ordinary incidents of prison life". Short periods of administrative segregation imposed as punishment for violating prison rules thus did not implicate a liberty interest, because inmates in the general population experience periods of lockdown, the degree of confinement in administrative segregation was not excessive, and the duration of the segregation period was not disruptive to the inmate's environment.

The Court did not find it necessary to define what the "ordinary incidents" of prison life were, vis-à-vis confinement in Supermax conditions, for "assignment to OSP imposes an atypical and significant hardship under any plausible baseline." Prisoners in OSP are forbidden "almost all human contact". They may not converse with each other from cell to cell. Lights are on 24 hours a day, though for some periods of time the light is dimmed. Inmates are allowed only one hour of exercise per day, in a small indoor room. These circumstances may be common to mere administrative segregation; however, unlike the administrative segregation considered in Conner, placement at OSP was for an indefinite period of time, and such placement rendered an inmate ineligible for parole. The Court found that the combination of these two sets of conditions rose to the level of an "atypical and significant hardship within the correctional context", and hence gave rise to a liberty interest in avoiding placement in OSP. This is so despite any purported necessity of controlling the danger posed by high-risk inmates.

Having found a liberty interest in avoiding placement in OSP, the Court went on to consider whether Ohio afforded its inmates the required procedural protections. The particular protections required emerged from a three-part balancing test first articulated in Mathews v. Eldridge, 424 U.S. 319 (1976). The three factors are (1) the private interest affected by the official action, (2) the risk of an erroneous deprivation by the procedures used, and the marginal value of any increased protections, and (3) the burden on the government that adding those increased protections would impose. After weighing these factors, the Court concluded that Ohio afforded its inmates the requisite procedures. The interest in avoiding assignment to a Supermax facility must be "evaluated... within the context of the prison system and its attendant curtailment of liberties." Ohio afforded inmates notice that it was considering placing them in OSP and a fair opportunity for rebuttal; this was consistent with the procedural protections afforded in other prison administration contexts. Furthermore, Ohio's requirement that it explain the factual basis for the classification review and offer the inmate an opportunity for rebuttal "safeguards against the inmate being mistaken for another or being singled out for insufficient reason". At each of the three levels, the reviewing administrator can decline to recommend OSP placement, at which point the process terminates. The Court found this arrangement preferable to Ohio's former system, under which inmates were sometimes placed in OSP without any explanation at all. Because the inmate will always have an explanation of the reasons for recommended OSP placement, he will always have something to argue against when he proceeds to the next level of review or comes up for his next suitability hearing.

The third prong of Mathews addresses the burden on the state; in the prison context, this factor is a dominant consideration. Prison security, particularly the management of prison gangs, "provides the backdrop of the State's interest". As the State of California pointed out in an amicus brief, "clandestine, organized, fueled by race-based hostility, and committed to fear and violence as a means of disciplining their own and their rivals, gangs seek nothing less than to control prison life and to extend their power outside prison walls." Testifying against a member of the gang can bring swift, lethal retribution. And because many heinous gang members are serving life sentences, the ordinary deterrent of a prison sentence for new crimes is diminished.

Furthermore, prison is an expensive proposition. Ohio spends nearly $35,000 to house one inmate in a maximum security prison for one year, and over $49,000 to house an inmate at OSP for the same period of time. The prison system can devote its scarce resources to Supermax prisons for some dangerous inmates, or it can spend money on vocational and rehabilitative programs for inmates whose prospects are better. Courts should "give substantial deference to prison management decisions before mandating additional expenditures for elaborate procedural safeguards when correctional officers conclude that a prisoner has engaged in disruptive behavior". In light of the danger to potential witnesses on behalf of candidates for OSP placement, particularly the difficulty in predicting when certain inmate-witnesses will be the targets of reprisal from gangs, the Court concluded that allowing the inmate to call witnesses to testify at a classification hearing was not required by due process.

Finally, after balancing the Mathews factors, the Court concluded that Ohio's procedure for assigning inmates to OSP is adequate to safeguard an inmate's liberty interest in avoiding being sent there. The state was not directly trying to take away credit toward a sentence that an inmate had already earned, an action that requires greater procedural safeguards. The heavy reliance on the expertise of prison administrators also supported the conclusion that Ohio's procedures were adequate.
