= Justice of the peace =

Judicial officer

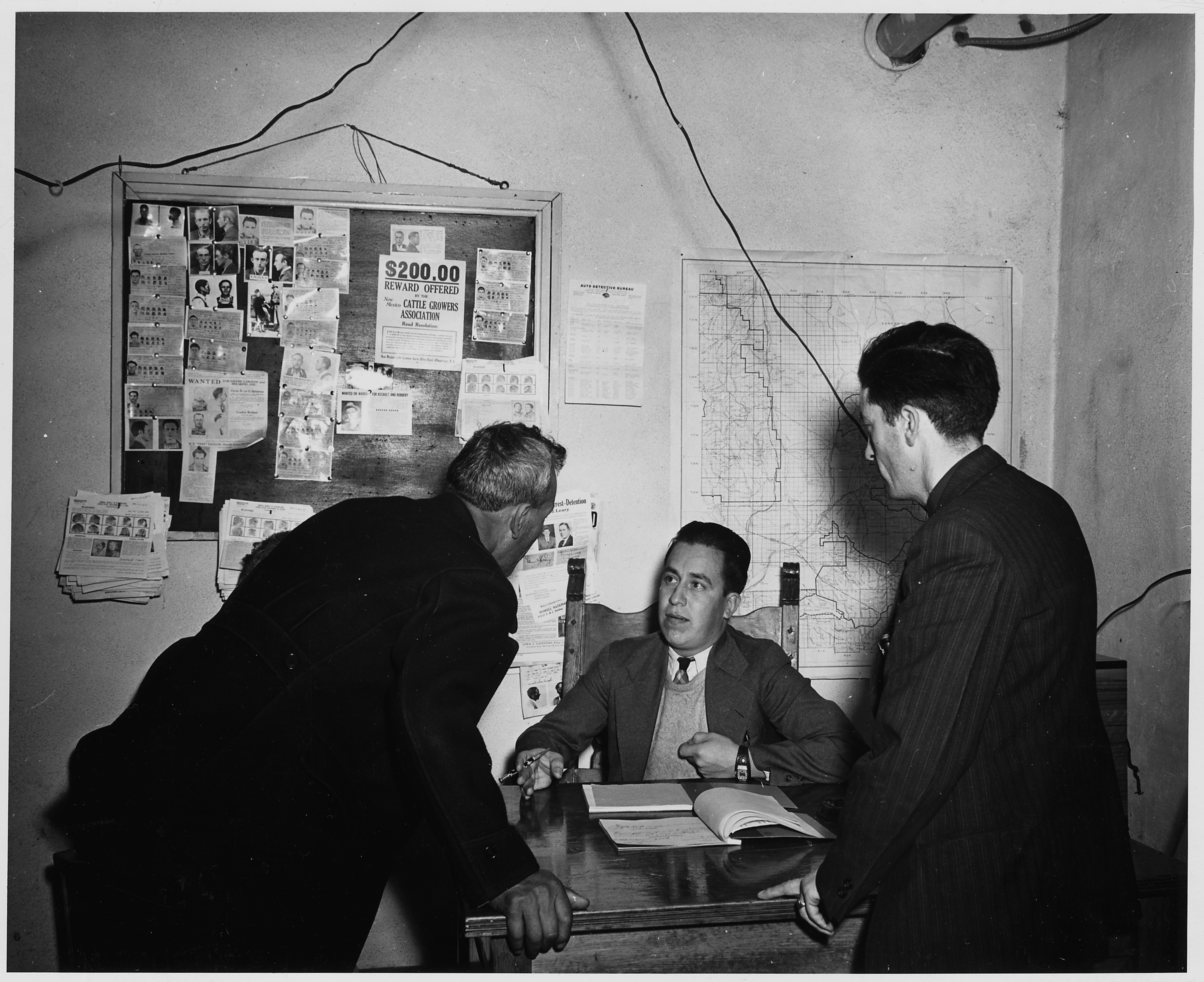
A justice of the peace in Taos County, New Mexico, United States, hears a case (1941).

A justice of the peace (JP) is a judicial officer of a lower court, elected or appointed by means of a commission (letters patent) to keep the peace. In past centuries the term commissioner of the peace was often used with the same meaning. Depending on the jurisdiction, such justices dispense summary justice or merely deal with local administrative applications in common law jurisdictions. Justices of the peace are appointed or elected from the citizens of the jurisdiction in which they serve, and are (or were) usually not required to have any formal legal education in order to qualify for the office. Some jurisdictions have varying forms of training for JPs. In some jurisdictions, the court over which a justice of the peace presides is called a justice court.

== History in the United Kingdom ==
In 1195, Richard I of England and his minister Hubert Walter commissioned certain knights to preserve the peace in unruly areas. They were responsible to the King in ensuring that the law was upheld and preserving the "King's peace". Therefore, they were known as "keepers of the peace".

The Justice of the Peace Act 1327 (1 Edw. 3. Stat. 2. c. 16) had referred to "good and lawful men" to be appointed in every county in the land to "guard the peace"; such individuals were first referred to as conservators of the peace, or wardens of the peace. The title justice of the peace derives from 1361, in the reign of Edward III. The "peace" to be guarded is the sovereign's, the maintenance of which is the duty of the Crown under the royal prerogative. Justices of the peace still use the power conferred or re-conferred on them since 1361 to bind over unruly persons "to be of good behaviour". The bind over is not a punishment, but a preventive measure, intended to ensure that people thought likely to offend will not do so. The justices' alternative title of "magistrate" dates from the 16th century, although the word had been in use centuries earlier to describe some legal officials of Roman times.

In the centuries from the Tudor period until the onset of the Industrial Revolution, the JPs constituted a major element of the English (later British) governmental system, which in modern times has sometimes been termed a squirearchy (i.e., dominance of the land-owning gentry). For example, historian Tim Blanning notes that while in Britain the royal prerogative was decisively curbed by the Bill of Rights 1689, in practice the central government in London had a greater ability to get its policies implemented in the rural outlying regions than could contemporary absolute monarchies such as France – a paradox due especially to JPs belonging to the same social class as the Members of Parliament and thus having a direct interest in getting laws actually enforced and implemented on the ground.

Being an unpaid office, undertaken voluntarily and sometimes more for the sake of renown or to confirm the justice's standing within the community, the justice was typically a member of the gentry. The justices of the peace conducted arraignments in all criminal cases, and tried misdemeanours and infractions of local ordinances and bylaws. Towns and boroughs with enough burdensome judicial business that could not find volunteers for the unpaid role of justice of the peace had to petition the Crown for authority to hire a paid stipendiary magistrate.

The Municipal Corporations Act 1835 stripped the power to appoint normal JPs from those municipal corporations that had it. This was replaced by the present system, where the Lord Chancellor nominates candidates with local advice, for appointment by the Crown.

Until the introduction of elected county councils in the 19th century, JPs, in quarter sessions, also administered the county at a local level. Their many roles included regulating wages and food supplies, managing roads, bridges, prisons and workhouses and they undertook to provide and supervise locally those services mandated by the Crown and Parliament for the welfare of the county. To this end they set the County Rate, where one was set at all.

Women were not allowed to become JPs in the United Kingdom until 1919, the first woman being Ada Summers, the Mayor of Stalybridge, who was a JP by virtue of her office. In October 1920 Summers was appointed a JP in her own right, alongside other pioneers including Edith Sutton and Miriam Lightowler in Halifax. Emily Murphy of Edmonton, Canada, preceded her by some three and a half years. As at 2018 in England and Wales, about one-third of JPs are women.

In special circumstances, a justice of the peace can be the highest governmental representative, so in fact 'gubernatorial', in a colonial entity. This was the case in the Tati Concessions Land, a gold-mining concession in the Matabele kingdom, until its annexation by the British Bechuanaland protectorate.

== History in the United States ==
The office of justice of the peace was brought to North America from England and became a common feature of colonial and later state government in the United States. In many states, the office was recognized in state constitutions or otherwise established by statute as part of the lower judiciary.

In the American colonies, justices of the peace exercised jurisdiction in certain civil and criminal matters, and in the United States they traditionally handled minor civil disputes, petty offenses, and a variety of local magisterial functions. Depending on the jurisdiction, their duties could include issuing warrants, administering oaths, performing marriages, and handling other ministerial acts. Many historically were lay judges rather than legally trained attorneys.

During the 20th century, the office declined in many states as part of broader judicial reform and court unification. Reformers criticized older systems of local lay courts as fragmented and inconsistent, and many states replaced justice of the peace courts with more centralized lower courts staffed by salaried, law-trained judges.

The use of lay judges in criminal cases also became the subject of constitutional litigation. In Gordon v. Justice Court (1974), the Supreme Court of California held that due process was violated when a non-attorney judge presided over a criminal trial that could result in imprisonment, unless that right was validly waived. In North v. Russell (1976), the Supreme Court of the United States held that trial before a nonlawyer judge did not violate due process where the defendant had a right to a trial de novo before a law-trained judge.

Although many states later abolished justice of the peace courts or transferred their jurisdiction to other lower courts, the office was not eliminated nationwide.

== Modern use ==
=== Australia ===
A justice of the peace in Australia is typically someone of good stature in the community who is authorised to witness and sign statutory declarations and affidavits and to certify copies of original documents.

There are no Federal level JPs in Australia, as this power is retained by the State Governments and devolved to the Territory Governments. Where a Federal Government document or task requires the services of a JP, the rules of each individual State or Territory government will dictate if they have the authority to assist. Criteria for appointment vary widely, depending on the state.

==== Australian Capital Territory ====
In the Australian Capital Territory (colloquially, the ACT), there is only the single level of Justice of the Peace. They are appointed on an as-needed basis, and a potential appointee must be an Australian Citizen, and both a resident of, and enrolled on the electoral roll, of the territory. They must also not be an undischarged bankrupt, and consent to criminal history checks being undertaken prior to appointment.

Appointment is for life, unless a JP resigns, is suspended/dismissed from office, or resides outside of the ACT for a period of more than 12 consecutive months.

JPs for the ACT also cover the Australian External Territory of Norfolk Island, and the Internal Jervis Bay Territory, subject to local law variations in those two jurisdictions.

==== New South Wales ====
The most common functions performed by a justice of the peace in New South Wales are to witness the signing of a statutory declaration, witness the signing of an affidavit and certify that a copy of an original document is a true copy.

JPs are appointed by the Governor of New South Wales for five-year terms. They are volunteers, who come from all walks of life and all sections of the community. JPs are people who are trusted to be honest, careful and impartial when performing the functions of a JP. They must not charge a fee or accept a gift for providing JP services, tell people what to write in a statutory declaration, write it for them, or give them legal advice.

Ways to find a JP in New South Wales include:

1. Search the JP Public Register, which lists all JPs for each postcode area and provides a telephone contact number for JPs who serve the community directly.

2. Check a public listing of scheduled JP services to find when JPs are available at scheduled times and locations across the state.

In the early years of the Colony of New South Wales, justices of the peace had far greater responsibilities and broader roles in the administration of justice than now.

==== Queensland ====
In the state of Queensland, a "justice of the peace (qualified)" has the additional powers to issue search warrants and arrest warrants and, in conjunction with another justice of the peace (qualified) constitute a magistrates' court for exercising powers to remand defendants in custody, grant bail, and adjourn court hearings.

Some justices are appointed as justice of the peace (magistrates' court), usually in remote Aboriginal communities, to perform many of the functions that might otherwise fall to a stipendiary magistrate.

In Queensland, a lawyer may be appointed as a Justice of the Peace without further education or qualification and has the full powers of a JP (Magistrate's Court). A commissioner for declarations (C.dec) has powers limited to witnessing documents, witnessing statutory declarations, witnessing affidavits, witnessing and administering oaths and affirmations.

The first woman to become a JP in Queensland was Matilda (Maud) Hennessey of Mackay on 24 April 1918.

==== South Australia ====
In South Australia, there are two types of justices: justice of the peace and special justices.

A justice of the peace in South Australia is typically someone of good stature in the community who is authorised to witness and sign statutory declarations, affidavits, waiver rights, search warrants, drug warrants, divorce documents, and to certify copies of original documents and to witness the signing of power of attorney and guardianship documents, providing the JP is satisfied with the capability of the signatory.

A Special Justice (SJ) is a higher level of justice of the peace in South Australia; they sit on the bench of the magistrates' court hearing cases in the petty sessions division.

The South Australian Attorney-General has set up a web site to locate justices of the peace. The majority of metropolitan and many regional Councils (Local Government authorities) have a rotational justice of the peace in residence at nominated times.

South Australia's first women justices were appointed in July 1915.

==== Victoria ====
Justices of the peace and bail justices, who are also volunteers, are appointed to serve a semi-judicial function in all areas of the Victorian community. The main official roles in the Victorian community include witnessing statutory declarations, witnessing affidavits and hearing bail matters outside court hours (bail justices only).

The first woman to become a JP in Victoria was Mary Catherine Rogers who, in 1920, became the first woman councillor in Australia when she was elected in the City of Richmond.

Justices of the peace provide a service to the community as independent witnesses of statutory declarations, powers of attorney and affidavits. JPs, who are also volunteers, are selected through an extensive interview, written exam and practical testing. They are recommended by the state attorney-general and appointed by the governor-in-council, and it is their job to authorise and witness statutory declarations and affidavits within the state of Victoria. As of August 2022, there are currently around 3500 JPs and bail justices in Victoria, who collectively sign more than 1.5 million documents and assist more than 350,000 people each year.

Justices of the Peace and Bail Justices may use the post-nominals JP and BJ respectively after their names.

===== Bail justices =====
The primary role of a bail justice within Victoria is to hear bail applications (including after-hours bail) under the Bail Act 1977, and to hear applications for Interim Accommodation Orders for children (under the Children, Youth and Families Act 2005). Bail justices can also witness Victorian statutory declarations and affidavits. Bail justices are appointed for terms of four years and may be re-appointed repeatedly until they attain 70 years of age. They are often required to attend call outs and rule on bail applications or protection applications for children in danger on weekends and late at night when the courts are closed. Candidates must successfully complete a three-day training course run by the Department of Justice. Bail justices, also have some limited powers under federal legislation, including the power to conduct interstate extradition hearings and extending question time for federal police.

==== Western Australia ====
Justices of the peace in Western Australia are appointed by the Governor who authorises them to carry out a wide range of official administrative and judicial duties in the community.

As well as presiding in the Magistrates Court, justices of the peace are regularly called upon by the WA Police to sign search warrants and authorise the issuing of summonses. The administrative tasks include witnessing affidavits and documents such as wills and statutory declarations.

"Visiting justices" are a special group of justices of the peace, appointed to preside over cases within the prison system.

JPs for Western Australia also cover the Australian External Territories of Cocos (Keeling) Islands and Christmas Island.

=== Bangladesh ===
The Code of Criminal Procedure, 1898 ( ACT NO. V OF 1898 )

Chapter II OF THE CONSTITUTION OF CRIMINAL COURTS AND OFFICES

25. In virtue of their respective offices, the Judges of the Supreme Court are Justices of the Peace within and for of the whole of Bangladesh, Sessions Judges, Chief Judicial Magistrate and Metropolitan Magistrates are Justices of the Peace within their respective jurisdictions.

(Justice of the peace for the mafassal) 22. The Government may, by notification in the official Gazette, appoint such persons resident within Bangladesh and not being the subjects of any foreign State as it thinks fit to be Justices of the Peace within and for the local area mentioned in such notification.

=== Belgium ===
In Belgium, the justices of the peace (Dutch: vredegerecht, French: justice de paix, German: Friedensgericht) function as the small claims courts in the country's judicial system; they stand at the bottom of the Belgian judicial hierarchy and only handle civil cases. There is a justice of the peace in each judicial canton of Belgium, of which there are 187 in total as of 2017. The justices of the peace have original jurisdiction over cases in which the disputed amount does not exceed 5,000 euro (as of September 2018), except for the matters over which another court or tribunal has exclusive jurisdiction. In addition, the justices of the peace have original jurisdiction over a number of matters irrespective of the disputed amount, such as cases involving the renting or leasing of real estate, evictions, easement, land consolidation, consumer credit or unpaid utility bills. The justices of the peace also have original jurisdiction in certain aspects of family law, most notably legal guardianships for incapacitated seniors, and the involuntary commitment of the mentally ill to psychiatric facilities. The judgments made by the justices of the peace can, with some exceptions, be appealed to the tribunals of first instance.

=== Canada ===
In Canada, justices of the peace play a role in the administration of justice at the provincial level. Justices are generally appointed by the lieutenant governors of Canada's provinces, and by the commissioners of Canada's territories, on the advice of their relevant premier or Attorney General. Canada made the second (first was in South Australia a year earlier) appointment in the then British Empire of a woman as a magistrate, namely Emily Murphy, who was sworn in as a police magistrate in the Women's Court of the City of Edmonton (Alberta) on 19 June 1916.

==== British Columbia ====
In British Columbia, pursuant to the Provincial Court Act, all judges are justices of the peace, and hence all of them are peace officers.

==== Northwest Territories ====
In the Northwest Territories, justices may hear summary conviction matters, municipal by-laws, and certain criminal matters. However, in more populated provinces justices usually preside over bail hearings and provincial offences courts. When not in a court session, a justice can perform other judicial functions, such as issuing search warrants.

==== Ontario ====
In Ontario, justices of the peace can preside over judicial interim release (bail) hearings and other criminal hearings. JPs can also exercise jurisdiction over provincial regulatory offences and municipal by-law prosecutions. JPs must retire by reaching the age of 65, but may continue working until 75 subject to the approval of the Chief Justice of the Ontario Court of Justice.

==== Quebec ====
In Quebec, there are two types of justices of the peace: administrative justices of the peace and presiding justices of the peace.

Administrative justices of the peace are court officers appointed by the Minister of Justice, and perform duties such as receiving criminal informations and issuing warrants. Presiding justices of the peace are appointed by commission under the Great Seal, and can try some criminal matters and issue warrants. They are appointed from advocates of at least ten years' standing and serve full-time until the age of 70.

==== Yukon ====
In Yukon, justices of the peace are lay officers of the court. They sit in the Justice of the Peace Court, which is part of the Territorial Court of Yukon.

=== Hong Kong ===
In Hong Kong, the historical functions of justices of the peace have been replaced by full-time, legally qualified magistrates. Nowadays, justices of the peace are essentially titles of honour given by the Government to community leaders, and to certain officials while they are in their terms of offices. They have no judicial functions, and their main duties include visiting prisons, institutions for young offenders and drug addicts, psychiatric hospitals, remand homes, places of refuge, reception and detention centres, administering statutory declarations, and serving as members of advisory panels. They also monitor the drawing of the Mark Six to ensure fairness.

=== India ===
In India, justices of the peace exist, but no longer occupy a prominent post. One of the famous justices in India was Kavasji Jamshedji Petigara.

=== Ireland ===
'Justices of the peace' existed in Ireland prior to 1922, sitting in a bench under the supervision of resident magistrates at petty sessions to try minor offences summarily, and with a county court judge (in his capacity of chairman of quarter sessions) and jury to try more serious offences at quarter sessions. In the Irish Free State the position was effectively abolished by the District Justices (Temporary Provisions) Act 1923 and permanently abolished by the Courts of Justice Act 1924. Their judicial powers were replaced by full-time, salaried, legally qualified district justices (now called district judges) and their quasi-judicial powers by unpaid lay peace commissioners. However, the power of Peace Commissioners has been reduced following a number of Supreme Court Challenges. Even one Government Department stopped accepting Peace Commissioner signatures because "there is no available updated register or reliable data base to confirm that the person signing the form as a witness is in fact a Peace Commissioner. In the absence of such verification being possible, the practice was changed to remove the risk of fraudulent activity and maintain the integrity of the process." In general, Peace commissioners may sign statutory declarations, and may rarely issue summons and search warrants to the Garda Síochána (Irish police). A peace commissioner can witness the signature of an affidavit. In addition Peace Commissioners can sign custody agreements between legal guardians in relation to visitation etc. These agreements are legally binding and can be altered only by a Judge in the regular courts. Peace Commissioners are appointed on the basis of good character and usually prominent standing in their local communities.

=== Jamaica ===
A justice of the peace, according to the Ministry of Justice, is a person of unquestionable integrity who seeks to promote and protect the rights of the individual and helps to provide justice to persons in a particular community. Additionally, the JP serves as a justice in petty court sessions, attends juvenile court sessions, issues summonses, considers applications for bail, explains and signs legal documents, sits on licensing panels, and gives counsel/advice. Any Jamaican citizen that can speak and write English is eligible to become a JP. Any club/organisation/citizen can recommend someone to become JP for a community. JPs are chosen under the Governor-General's discretion.

=== Malaysia ===
In Malaysia, justices of the peace (jaksa pendamai in Malay, also abbreviated JP) have largely been replaced in magistrates' courts by legally qualified (first-class) stipendiary magistrates. However, state governments continue to appoint justices of the peace as honours. In 2004, some associations of justices of the peace pressed the federal government to allow justices of the peace to sit as second-class magistrates in order to reduce the backlog of cases in the courts.

=== New Zealand ===
The legal framework for the office of Justice of the Peace within New Zealand is derived from the Act of Parliament Justices of the Peace Act 1957, and subsequent amendments.

There are two levels of this position within New Zealand: The standard level of 'Justice of the Peace', and a separate 'Judicial Justice of the Peace'. Persons so appointed may use the post-nominals JP and JJP respectively. A JP who is retired may apply to the Secretary for Justice for permission to use the post-nominals 'JP (retired)'.

Appointment as a JP is for life, unless a voluntary resignation is tendered in writing, or a JP is suspended or dismissed from office due to misconduct, bankruptcy, or other specific reasons.

==== Justice of the Peace ====
A JP in New Zealand is someone of good stature in the community who is authorised to witness and sign a number of documents, including statutory declarations, affidavits, and producing certified copies of documents, amongst others. In some limited circumstances they may also perform citizenship ceremonies, and act as a 'Visiting Justice' in prisons. They are nominated for office by local Members of Parliament and appointed by the Governor-General. They must take both the Oath of Allegiance and the Judicial Oath.

==== Judicial Justice ====
If a local JP Federation determines that a need for one or more JJPs exists, they will issue a call for nominations to JPs in their territory. Following closure of nominations, a shortlist will be drawn up, and interviews undertaken. If a prospective applicant passes the interview stage, and the relevant training, exams, and assignments are successfully completed, they can be sworn in as a JJP. This means they can then be assigned to the bench in the relevant district court to oversee minor criminal cases. These would involve tasks such as the exercise of powers to remand defendants in custody, grant bail, and adjourn court hearings.

Appointment as a JJP is at the pleasure of the Secretary for Justice, generally for a minimum of 5 years, and for as long as there is a need in the area an individual resides. Should an individual move abroad, to an area of New Zealand where the service is no longer required, or the local area no longer requires it, the JJP appointment will be terminated.

==== Issuing Officer ====
Prior to 2012, all JPs were able to issue search and arrest warrants, but with the passage of the NZ Act of Parliament Search and Surveillance Act 2012, this power was spun off to the separate position of Issuing Officer.

Under the law, an Issuing Officer does not have to be a Justice of the Peace - Holders of some positions within the judicial system (e.g. Registrar or Deputy Registrar of a court) are Issuing Officers ex officio for the duration of their time in those roles.

For a JP or JJP to exercise this power after 2012, they must apply to become an Issuing Officer separately. The application process involves a further training course and exam, followed by a vetting and approval process by the Attorney-General. Appointment as an Issuing Officer is for a maximum of three years, and may be renewed for a further three years at expiry as needed.

On 1 October 2025, new amendements came into force as part of amendments to the Mutual Assistance in Criminal Matters Act 1992, in support of New Zealand's accession to the Budapest Convention on Cybercrime. These amendments mean that some powers to issue search warrants and production orders arising from criminal matters in other countries that were previously available to Issuing Officers, are instead now reserved only to High Court Judges.

=== Pakistan ===
Sections 22, 22-A and 22-B of the Code of Criminal Procedure, 1898 provide for the appointment of justices of the peace by the provincial governments, their powers and duties respectively. However, seldom are justices of the peace appointed in Pakistan outside the judiciary. Session and additional session judges act as ex-officio justices of the peace as per Section 25 of the Code of Criminal Procedure, 1898. An Ex-officio Justice of the Peace may issue appropriate directions to the police authorities concerned on a complaint regarding- (i) non-registration of a criminal case; (ii) transfer of investigation from one police officer to another; and (iii) neglect, failure or excess committed by a police authority in relation to its functions and duties. Such functions being quasi-judicial in nature could not be termed as executive, administrative or ministerial.(PLD 2016 Supreme Court 581)

It is pertinent to note however, as many academics have pointed out, that there is great utility in the appointment of such justices especially in rural areas where enmity between rival groups can lead to the inability of registration of cognizable offences and biased judicial proceedings.

=== Singapore ===
In Singapore, the functions of Justices of the Peace have been replaced by full-time, legally qualified magistrates. JP in Singapore are appointed amongst outstanding individuals in Singapore who have made significant contributions in their professions, the public service, social services and the community at large by the President of the Republic of Singapore, under section 11(1) of the State Courts Act 1970 for a renewable five-year term.

JP do not serve any judicial roles, rather they derive their functions from statute. Some examples of the functions, powers and duties of a Justice of the Peace includes:

- In accordance with the Prisons Act 1933, a JP who is appointed as a Visiting Justice may visit any Singapore prisons at any time to ascertain whether the prison regulations are adhered to. A JP may also upon receiving a report of an aggravated prison offence, investigate the charge and punish the prisoner if found guilty for up to 30 days confinement and 24 strokes of the cane.
- May under the Societies Act 1966, enter or authorize any police officer to enter any place if they believe that a meeting of an unlawful society is being held there. They may also issue a search warrant to seize any items connected to the unlawful society and warrant of arrest on any persons found in that place.
- Administer oaths under the Trade Marks Act 1998, Merchant Shipping Act 1995 and Parliamentary Elections Act 1954 and Presidential Elections Act 1991.

Other roles of a JP includes being mediators in the State Courts of Singapore or marriage solemnisers in the Registry of Marriages.

Newly appointed justices of the peace are required by Section 17 of the State Courts Act to take the oath of office and allegiance as set out in the schedule to the State Courts Act, before exercising the functions of their good office. The President may also revoke the appointment of any Justice of the Peace.

=== Sri Lanka ===
In Sri Lanka, Justice of the Peace is an honorary post, with authorisation to witness and sign statutory declarations and affidavits as well as certify documents. Persons appointed as a Justice of the Peace may use the post-nominal JP. Current appointments are made under the Judicature Act No 02 of 1978, by the Minister of Justice at his/her discretion by publishing a list in The Gazette and appointee taking oaths before a high court, district court judge or magistrate with registrar of the supreme court recording it. There are four types of appointments of Justice of the Peace;

- Justice of the Peace and Unofficial magistrate
- Justice of the Peace for the Whole Island
- Justice of the Peace for a Judicial District
- Justice of the Peace (ex officio)

Senior Attorney at laws are appointed as Justice of the Peace and Unofficial magistrates to preside in the absence of a sitting Magistrate. Any citizen of Sri Lanka can apply to the Ministry of Justice providing their credentials to be appointed as a justice of the peace. However, the applicant should be one who has served the public and carries out social service and should be of good standing. These JPs would be appointed with legal authority in all parts of the island or limited to a judicial district. The President of Sri Lanka and their officers are ex officio justices of the peace. There about 100,000 JPs in the island.

The post was introduced in the island during the British colonial era by the Governor Frederick North in 1801 and was later reformed in 1871. Until 1938, appointments were made by the Governor, after which appointments were made by the Legal Secretary until 1947. After Ceylon gained its independence in 1948, appointments were made by the Governor General and the Minister of Justice. Justice of the Peace had the power to administer oaths and affirmations per the Courts Ordinance No. 1 on 1889 section 84 and they could formally appoint members of the public to act as special police officers in times of turmoil and riots. Since certain government officers were ex-officio justices of the peace, this allowed British colonial officers to appoint special police officers from the European planters in times of crisis such as the 1915 riots. The Village Councils Law (No. 6 of 1964) made the Chairman of the Village Council an ex officio justices of the peace for that village area.

=== Tonga ===
In 2014, for the first time, Justices of the Peace were authorised in Tonga. JPs are appointed by the Crown, but the Lord Chief Justice regulates their duties and defines their powers. The first JPs were warranted with duties including granting bail; issuing search warrants and subpoenas; taking affidavits, declarations and oaths; and having the power to witness documents. Term of office is one year and officials can be reappointed. The initial 19 JPs appointed were: 'Aisea Ta'ofi and Sione Hinakau of Niuatoputapu; 'Inoke Tuaimei'api of Niuafo'ou; Siosiua Hausia from ʻEua; Sione Palu, Sione Fakahua, Me'ite Fukofuka and Kisione Taulani of Ha'apai; Salesi Kauvaka, Viliami Pasikala, Haniteli Fa'anunu, Meli Taufaeteau and Moleni Taufa from Vava'u; and Salote Fukofuka, 'Amelia Helu, ʻOfa Likiliki, Tevita Fakatou, Sioape Tu'iono and Semisi Tongia of Tongatapu.

=== United Kingdom ===
==== England and Wales ====
A magistrates' court in England and Wales is typically composed of a bench of (usually three) justices of the peace (otherwise known as magistrates) who dispense summary justice. They decide on offences which carry a community sentence, a prison sentence (maximum of six months for any one offence, up to one year for multiple offences), or an unlimited fine. They are advised on points of law and procedure by a legally qualified justices' clerk and their assistants. In practice, JPs have a wide range of sentencing options, which include issuing fines, imposing community orders, or dealing with offences by means of a discharge. In more serious cases, where magistrates' consider that their sentencing powers are insufficient, they can send 'either-way' offenders to the Crown Court for sentencing.

Justices of the peace are trained volunteers. No formal qualifications are required but magistrates need intelligence, common sense, integrity and the capacity to act fairly. Membership is widely spread throughout the local area and drawn from all walks of life following a rigorous selection process undertaken by a local advisory committee, who recommends to the Lord Chancellor those individuals who have demonstrated the five key qualities for appointment which are: (1) awareness of social issues; (2) maturity and understanding; (3) reliability and commitment; (4) understanding of documents and effective communication; and (5) logical thinking. Those who are employed in some occupations (e.g. police officers) cannot be appointed due to potential conflict of interest.

All new justices of the peace undergo comprehensive training before sitting. There is a mentoring program to help guide new appointees (mentors are magistrates with at least three years' service). The training is delivered by the Judicial College and covers the necessary law and procedure required for their role. They continue to receive training throughout their judicial career, and are appraised every four years (every two years for a presiding justice) to check that they continue to remain competent in their role. Additional training is given to justices choosing to sit in the Youth Court, or those dealing with family matters. New JPs sit with mentors on at least six occasions during their first eighteen months. Justices of the peace are unpaid appointees, but they may receive allowances to cover travelling expenses, subsistence, and loss of earnings for those not paid by their employer while sitting as a magistrate, up to £116.78 a day. Such person may sit at any magistrates' court in England and Wales, but in practice they are appointed to their local bench (a colloquial and legal term for the local court). Justices of the peace often sit as a panel of three; two as a minimum in most cases, save for cases under the Single Justice Procedure. Many are members of the Magistrates' Association, which provides advice, training and represents magistrates. Justices of the peace must sit for a minimum of 26 sessions (half-days) per year. An employer must, by law, allow a justice of the peace reasonable time off work to serve as such.

The lead magistrate is known as a presiding justice (PJ) and should be addressed in court as "sir" or "ma'am" or "your worship", and the magistrates collectively as "your worships". In writing they are their usual name followed by "JP" (for "justice of the peace"). Other magistrates on the bench are known as "wingers". All three magistrates contribute equally to the decision-making and carry equal authority, but the presiding justice will speak on their behalf in open court.

Magistrates' courts today can deal with lesser offences such as all summary offences, and some more serious triable 'either-way' matters, but where the magistrates' deem that their sentencing powers are sufficient. However, all criminal cases start in the magistrates' court. They handle over 95% of the criminal cases in England and Wales and Northern Ireland. With more serious offences, magistrates are responsible for indictment and committal to the Crown Court (a task in former times dealt with by a grand jury). Magistrates also have a civil jurisdiction, such as a family jurisdiction, or appeals against matters relating to licensing. Although they had a licensing jurisdiction dealing liquor, betting and clubs licensing applications, this was transferred under the Licensing Act 2003 to local authorities. The magistrates now act in licensing matters only as an appeal court from the decisions of the local authority. Justices of the peace are responsible for granting orders such as search warrants to the police and other authorities. They were required to live within 15 miles of where they sit in case they were needed to sign a warrant after hours, but they were replaced with "local justice areas" by the Courts Act 2003, meaning this is not formally required. Section 7 of the Courts Act 2003 states that "There shall be a commission of the peace for England and Wales—...b) addressed generally, and not by name, to all such persons as may from time to time hold office as justices of the peace for England and Wales". Thus, every magistrate in England and Wales may act as a magistrate anywhere there.

Cardiff Magistrates' Court is the only court in the country which deals with offences under the Companies Act 2006, such as for late filing of accounts or directors' offences; the main office of Companies House is in Cardiff. Westminster Magistrates' Court has special responsibilities for dealing with terrorism and extradition offences throughout the UK. Such cases are typically handled there by district judges rather than by justices of the peace.

The Courts Act 2003 provides the current framework for appointment of the justices, which is done by the Lord Chancellor in the name of sovereign. Justices can also be removed by the same mechanism.

As at 2021, 56% of sitting magistrates were women, 13% were black, Asian and minority ethnic, and 82% aged above 50 as at 1 April 2021.

==== Scotland ====
Within the Scottish legal system justices of the peace are trained volunteers who currently sit in the justice of the peace courts. These courts were introduced in 2009 as a replacement for the district courts (established in 1975), which in turn replaced burgh police courts. Justices sit alone or in threes with a qualified legal assessor as convener or clerk of court. They handle many cases of breaches of the peace – drunkenness, minor assaults, petty theft, and offences under the Civic Government (Scotland) Act 1982.

The maximum sentencing power of a justice of the peace is 60 days imprisonment, or a fine up to £2,500, or both, and the ability to disqualify drivers.

In 2006, the Scottish Government announced its intention to unify the management of the sheriff and district courts in Scotland but retain lay justices, as part of its initiative to create a unified judiciary under the Lord President. Following the passage of the Criminal Proceedings etc. (Reform) (Scotland) Act 2007 the justice of the peace courts were implemented on a sheriffdom-by-sheriffdom basis.

In Glasgow, the volume of business required the employment of three solicitors as "stipendiary magistrates" who sat in place of the lay justices. The stipendiary magistrates' court had the same sentencing power as the summary sheriff court in summary proceedings, which was the ability to sentence an offender to up to one year in prison or fine them up to £10,000. Stipendiary magistrates were replaced by summary sheriffs.

==== Northern Ireland ====
In Northern Ireland, the situation initially continued as it had in pre-1922 Ireland. However, justices of the peace no longer sat out of petty sessions after the Summary Jurisdiction and Criminal Justice Act (Northern Ireland) 1935. Since then, magistrates' courts in Northern Ireland have consisted of legally qualified resident magistrates (now known as district judges (magistrates' courts)) sitting alone, except in cases involving children, where two lay panelists sat with the magistrate. Justices of the peace were confined to the power to conduct committal hearings, bind persons over to the peace, sign warrants, summons, and other official documents. They were appointed by the Lord Chancellor on the recommendation of a committee in each county court division.

The Justice (Northern Ireland) Act 2002 introduced a new office of lay magistrate, to sit alongside resident magistrates at magistrates' courts in certain matters. Unlike in England and Wales, "lay magistrate" is the official title of the position, to distinguish from existing justices of the peace who do not sit in the magistrates' courts. The first lay magistrates were appointed in 2005. Two lay magistrates sit with the district judge (magistrates' court) in criminal proceedings involving children (replacing the former lay panelists) and Family Proceedings Court matters. The district judge (magistrates' court), who is a barrister or solicitor of at least seven years standing, presides over the bench. Most criminal justice functions of JPs were transferred to lay magistrates. It is expected that there will be no further appointments of justices of the peace in Northern Ireland, although those already appointed retain the title and any functions not transferred to lay magistrate under the 2002 act.

=== United States ===
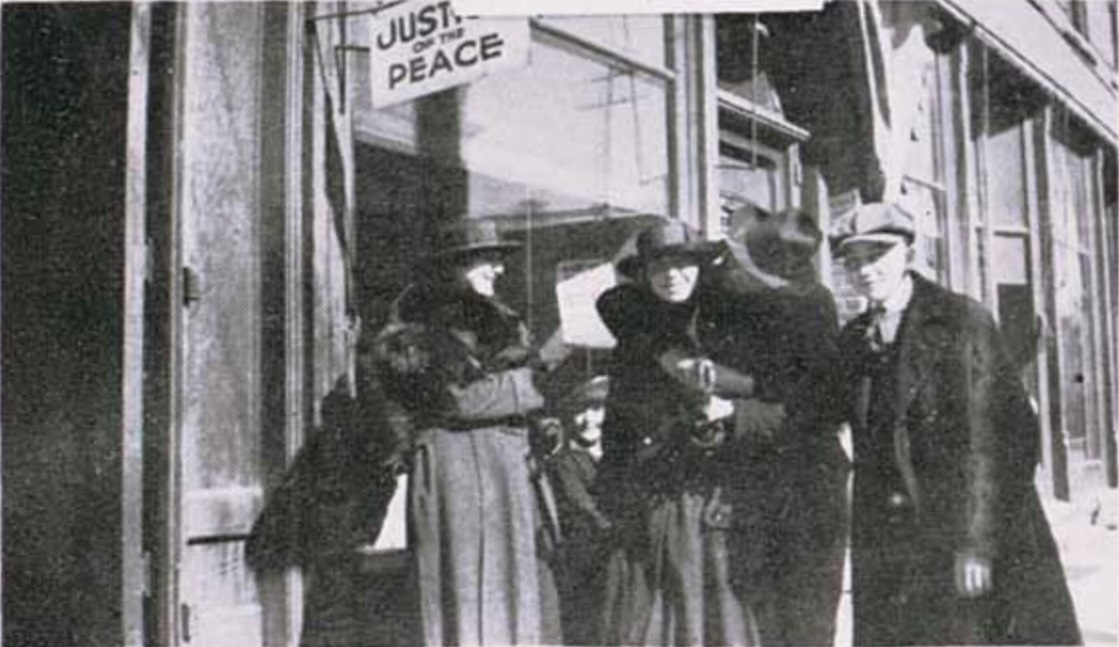
Justice of the Peace office in Sturgeon Bay, Wisconsin

In some US states, the justice of the peace is a judge of a court of limited jurisdiction, a magistrate, or a quasi-judicial official with certain statutory or common law magisterial powers. Some states have special qualifications or unique features for the office.

The justice of the peace typically presides over a court that hears misdemeanor cases, traffic violations, and other petty criminal infractions. The justice of the peace may also have authority over cases involving small debts, landlord and tenant disputes, or other small claims court proceedings. Proceedings before justices of the peace are often faster and less formal than the proceedings in other courts. In some jurisdictions a party convicted or found liable before a justice of the peace may have the right to a trial de novo before the judge of a higher court rather than an appeal strictly considered.

A justice of the peace also performs civil marriages.

==== Arizona ====
A justice of the peace has the same jurisdiction as a municipal magistrate with respect to traffic and misdemeanor cases and restraining orders, though over cases whose affairs are not contained within the confines of a single municipality. Additionally, the Justice Court hears cases involving county ordinances (ordinances enacted by the board of supervisors that apply only to unincorporated areas), civil lawsuits up to a limit of $10,000, small claims cases up to $2,500 (up to $3,500 in Maricopa County), and issues evictions, called writs of restitution (after a forcible detainer or special detainer action (eviction) being successfully completed by a landlord). Justices of the peace, also called JPs, or Judges of the Justice Court, are elected in partisan elections for four-year terms from specific districts called precincts. They have the same authority and responsibility as all other judges in the state with respect to performing marriages, administering oaths, adhering to the code of judicial conduct, and all aspects of justice administration. However, Arizona law does not require justices of the peace to be lawyers. Many justices of the peace are not legally trained, although all are required by the Arizona Supreme Court to complete a course at the Arizona Judicial College. As with JPs, municipal judges in Arizona are not required to be lawyers.

==== Arkansas ====
In Arkansas, a justice of the peace is an elected official equivalent to a county commissioner or county supervisor in some other states. Arkansas JPs sit on a county quorum court, composed of 9, 11, 13 or 15 JPs. The quorum court is a part-time body, elected from single-member districts, that has overall responsibility for county affairs. Among their responsibilities are passing the budget, creating new ordinances (at the misdemeanor level), setting property tax millage levels, and working with other elected officials. The full-time elected county administrator, who presides over the quorum court, is the county judge. Neither JPs nor the county judge have any judicial authority, though they do have the power to preside over civil marriages. Justices of the peace are elected every two years to these partisan offices. JPs first gained formal legislative authority under constitutional Amendment 55, passed by voters in 1974.

==== Connecticut ====
Justices of the peace in Connecticut can preside over marriages. Unlike some states, Connecticut JPs are not penalized for refusing to perform such ceremonies. They have the same general oath-giving powers as a notary public.

==== Florida ====
Florida had justices of the peace (with corresponding constables) from the time of its acquisition from Spain in 1821 until the Florida Constitution was amended in 1968 to abolish the post. From about 1940 to 1968, Florida counties had the ability to hold local referendums to allow county voters to abolish the post on a county-by-county basis. For example, Leon County, the location of Tallahassee, Florida's capital city, voted to abolish justices of the peace (and their associated constables) in the Fall elections of 1958. By 1958, the county commission had reduced the number of JOP districts from a turn-of-the-century peak of 13 districts to just two districts. The automobile age made the county sheriff able to patrol the entire county and made it possible for the citizenry to travel to the courthouse for legal proceedings.

==== Indiana ====
The office of Justice of the Peace was a constitutional office in Indiana from statehood in 1816. Article V, Section 12 of the 1816 Indiana Constitution provided that "a competent number of Justices of the peace shall be elected by the qualified electors in each Township, in the several Counties," with five-year terms and powers "regulated and defined by law." Article 7, Section 14 of the 1851 Constitution continued the office on substantially the same terms, with four-year terms. Indiana Justices of the Peace exercised countywide jurisdiction over small civil claims, misdemeanor criminal cases, marriages, traffic violations and the issuance of peace bonds. The 1970 amendment to Article 7 of the Indiana Constitution, approved by the voters on 3 November 1970, abolished Justices of the Peace as constitutional officers. The office was then abolished by statute effective 1 January 1976, with its civil small-claims jurisdiction transferred to newly created small claims courts.

==== Louisiana ====
Justices of the peace in Louisiana are elected to serve six-year terms as the judicial authority of a ward or district, but not where city courts exist. They have jurisdiction in civil matters when the amount in dispute does not exceed $5,000. They do not have jurisdiction when a title to real estate is involved, when the state or any political subdivision is a defendant, or in successions or probate matters. They are authorized to perform marriage ceremonies. There are around 390 such Justices of the peace.

==== Maine ====
In Maine, the office of the Justice of the Peace was merged with Notary Public, a process that took place from 1981 to 1988. The duties that were attached to the office of Justice of the Peace were fully transferred to the Notary Public in 1988. The office currently named as "Justice of the Peace" in Maine is a court officer, an attorney, involved in the process of issuing warrants and responding to complaints. The office however is not related to either the current Notary Public office or the previous Justice of the Peace office and is part of the Maine Bureau of Corporations, Elections & Commissions.

==== Massachusetts ====
Justices of the Peace in the Commonwealth of Massachusetts are appointed by the governor with the advice and consent of the Executive Council. Mass.gov describes the office as "classified as a judicial officer under Chapter III of the Massachusetts Constitution". Although the office is classified as a judicial office for constitutional purposes, a justice of the peace is not a trial-court judge and has no general judicial authority. Commissions of justices of the peace expire after seven years and may be renewed or replaced upon expiration.

The office is exercised through statutory and administrative functions such as solemnizing marriages, administering oaths and affirmations, taking acknowledgments, taking depositions, and calling certain meetings, rather than adjudicating disputes. Massachusetts law provides that justices of the peace and notaries public are commissioned "for the commonwealth," have jurisdiction throughout the Commonwealth when acting under their commissions, and may administer oaths or affirmations and take acknowledgments of deeds and other instruments unless otherwise provided by law.

A justice of the peace may be designated by the governor to solemnize marriages. Massachusetts law limits such designations to one justice of the peace in each town and additional justices not exceeding one for every five thousand inhabitants of a city or town, as the governor considers expedient. Upon the petition of the aldermen or selectmen of a town within a district-court judicial district, the governor, with the advice and consent of the council, may also designate and commission a justice of the peace residing in that town to take bail in criminal cases arising within the judicial district.

==== Minnesota ====
In Minnesota, the office of the Justice of the Peace was abolished in 1977 (Minn. Stat. 487.35). It has not existed for 40-plus years although some people who offer private wedding officiant services erroneously claim to be Justices of the Peace, this term may not properly be used inasmuch as the office has been abolished. Under Minnesota law, however, judges, retired judges, court administrators, retired court administrators, and other public officials designated in statute may officiate or solemnize marriage ceremonies in addition to licensed or ordained ministers of any religious denomination who have filed their credentials with a county registrar (Minn, Stat. 517.04).

==== New York ====
Justice courts are courts in New York State that handle traffic tickets, criminal and environmental conservation law matters, small claims and local code violations such as zoning. Though justice courts constitutionally are part of the New York State Unified Court System, state law generally makes justice courts independent of New York's Office of Court Administration (OCA) and instead makes justice courts the responsibility of their sponsoring localities. Town justice courts are often called town courts, and village justice courts are often called village courts. City courts in New York State handle mostly the same types of cases but are not justice courts.

The official title for judges in justice courts is justice, the same as in New York Supreme Court. However, in common usage, most people, including lawyers, call them judge. In general, justices in justice court do not have to be lawyers, except for justice courts with jurisdiction in villages. The vast majority are not. Many of these courts are in small towns and villages where none of the residents are lawyers. In the larger towns, the justices are almost always lawyers.

While justices and their court clerks receive training from OCA, there is tremendous variability in how cases are handled. This includes court procedures and substantive results. Some courts will dismiss a traffic ticket if the officer does not appear for a trial, while others will adjourn the matter to give the officer another chance. In some courts the police prosecute their own tickets, while in others an assistant district attorney from the county or a town or village attorney will prosecute the tickets. This may even vary by the type of officer, with state troopers and deputies prosecuting their tickets and a town attorney prosecuting tickets written by the town police.

Larger towns can have very busy caseloads, including several sessions a week with dozens of cases at each session, and people may have to wait hours before their cases are heard. In some small towns the caseload is extremely light, and a court might meet once a month and have only a few cases.

All criminal prosecutions that occur in towns and villages are commenced in a justice court. Misdemeanors are handled exclusively in the justice court, while felonies generally move up to county court after defendants are arraigned in a Justice Court before the case moves forward.

Similar matters in some places outside New York are handled by a justice of the peace.

Town and village Justices also possess limited powers of a New York notary public, ex-officio, only within the county in which the town or village for which they serve is located; they may administer oaths and affirmations and take acknowledgments and proofs of execution. Some Justices seek and obtain a formal New York notary public commission to permit free travel statewide and enjoy the additional privileges and international legal recognition of a notary public.

==== New Hampshire ====
New Hampshire justices of the peace are commissioned magisterial officers, appointed by the Governor and Executive Council to terms of five years, with the power to administer oaths, acknowledge instruments, perform marriage ceremonies and, effective 1 January 2008, solemnize civil unions for same-sex couples. They may also order compulsory mental examinations for good cause, act as a magisterial official regarding enforcement complaints on orders for isolation or quarantine issued by the Commissioner of Health and Human Services, administer oaths of office to public officials, take depositions and issue subpoenas. New Hampshire justices of the peace are also authorized, upon a showing of probable cause supported by affidavit, to issue arrest warrants, search warrants, administrative inspection warrants and by court appointment, to fix and receive bail in criminal cases.

==== North Carolina ====
Justices of the peace existed during the time of the Province of North Carolina (1712–1776.) They were appointed by the colonial Governor and served in counties or districts. Justices were essential for conducting court business. After independence, the 1776 Constitution of North Carolina and an act passed by the North Carolina General Assembly of 1777 re-defined justices of peace in the State of North Carolina. Justices of the peace were authorized to marry and had other court duties and assisted in collecting taxes. Duties of the justices were further reduced after the 1868 North Carolina Constitution and inferior courts were abolished.

==== Oregon ====
See also Oregon Justice Courts

In Oregon, as of 2023, Justices of the Peace preside over 22 Justice Courts. Oregon Justices of the Peace are state court judges, even though their salary is paid by their respective counties. A Justice of the Peace is elected for a term of six years. If a Justice of the Peace position becomes vacant during the Justice's term, the Governor appoints a Justice to fill the vacancy until the next general election.

In Oregon, Justices of the Peace have jurisdiction over civil lawsuits of less than $10,000; evictions; misdemeanors, and violations, like traffic tickets, boating violations, and wildlife violations. Further, Justice Courts have jurisdiction over violations of the county code, and some Justice Courts act as the municipal court of certain cities. Justice courts do not have jurisdiction over certain types of civil cases, including disputes over title to real estate, false imprisonment, libel, slander, and malicious prosecution. Justices of the Peace are authorized to perform courthouse weddings in Oregon.

==== Texas ====
In Texas, JPs are elected on a partisan ballot every four years.

Texas does not require a JP to be an attorney in good standing. However, JPs are required to be "well versed in the law" and take mandatory classes to retain their office. New JPs are required to take 80 hours of legal, state-mandated classes the first year, and 20 hours each year thereafter during their tenure in office.

Sections 18 and 19 of Article V of the Texas Constitution, as well as Chapters 27 and 28 of the Texas Government Code, outline the duties of these Courts and their officers.

Under Section 18, the number of JPs (and associated constables) is dependent on the size of the county:

- For counties with populations less than 18,000 (as determined by the census), the entire county shall be a one JP precinct, unless the Commissioners' Court determines that more are needed, in which case the court can divide the county into no more than four JP precincts.
- For counties with populations at least 18,000 but less than 50,000, the number of JP precincts shall be no less than two nor more than eight.
- For counties with populations 50,000 or greater, the number of JP precincts shall be no less than four nor more than eight.
- In any county with population less than 150,000, if any precinct contains a city with 18,000 or more population, that precinct shall have two JPs.
- In any county with population 150,000 or greater, each JP precinct may have more than one JP.
- Special provisions apply to Chambers and Randall counties (must have no fewer than two nor more than six precincts) and to Mills, Reagan, and Roberts (the Constable office is abolished, with the Sheriff's office performing all duties).

Section 19 sets forth the minimum jurisdiction of the JP court:

- Original jurisdiction in "criminal matters of misdemeanor cases punishable by fine only" (under the Texas Penal Code such offenses are called "Class C" misdemeanors, generally involving traffic offenses or public intoxication; however, in jurisdictions with a municipal court, if the traffic offense is written by a municipal police officer the municipal court will have jurisdiction, whereas if the offense is written by a state or county officer the JP court will hear the case),
- Exclusive jurisdiction in "civil matters where the amount in controversy is $200 or less", and
- "Such other jurisdiction as may be provided by law". Under this provision, the Legislature has raised the top limit on civil matters to $10,000 and assigned the JP courts, among others, the right to hear cases involving eviction as well as cases involving foreclosure and liens against personal property where the amount falls within the (revised) JP Court's jurisdiction.

JP cases are appealed to the county court level; the appeal results in a trial de novo. In criminal cases, cases beginning in justice court cannot be appealed beyond the county level court unless the fine is more than $100 or a constitutional matter is asserted.

In smaller counties without a coroner, the JP has the duty to perform inquests. The JP is also called out for any unattended deaths in the county.

A JP in a large precinct in a large county will work 5 days a week, 8 or more hours daily. Their duties will include, but are not necessarily limited to the following: trials of civil matters, both to a 6-person jury and to the bench, with an amount in controversy not exceeding $20,000.00. Trials of criminal matters involving traffic violations and class C misdemeanors punishable by fine only. Pre-trial motion dockets and show-cause hearings are held, and all discovery must be approved by the Judge in advance in civil cases. All criminal matters are controlled by the rules of criminal procedure and evidence. A much more restricted and smaller set of rules apply in civil matters unless, in the Judge's discretion, it is believed to be in the best interests of justice to apply the standard rules of evidence and procedure. The court has the exclusive jurisdiction of evictions. A Texas JP Judge will also magistrate prisoners and set bail. The Judge will hear juvenile violations such as truancy, underage drinking and smoking. Warrants of Arrest, Alias, Search and Capias Profine are issued. Protective Orders can be issued and result in jail time if violated. Several administrative matters are heard including the finding of a Dangerous Dog, Occupational Drivers License and tow hearings. Many writs are issued such as writs of re-entry to apartments, possession of realty and to reinstate utilities a landlord may have turned off. A JP has contempt power of $100 and up to 3 days in jail per occurrence. A JP is also authorized to perform marriage ceremonies.

==== Vermont ====
Justices in Vermont are elected officials, serving two-year terms. They are elected from each town or city within a county, and the number of justices elected from each municipality varies based on population, from as few as 3 or 5, to as many as 12 or 15. They generally serve as election, poll, and town meeting officials, and sit on the boards of civil authority and tax abatement within their municipalities. When assembled as the board of civil authority, they have the authority to decide, in the first instance, election disputes and disagreements about whether a voter should be registered. When the assessed value of property for real estate tax purposes is appealed to the board of civil authority, at least three board members are appointed to inspect the property. They may perform civil marriages throughout the state and are eligible to serve as notaries without payment of the usual registration fee. Justices may also serve as a magistrate when commissioned by the Supreme Court.

The option to serve as a magistrate has never been invoked and likely never will be; in June 2019 Associate Justice of the Vermont Supreme Court Marilyn Skoglund described the idea of commissioning a justice of the peace as an actual magistrate as "a truly frightening idea" and stated that she had never heard of such a thing actually happening.

==== Wyoming ====
Esther Hobart Morris became the first female justice of the peace in the United States in 1870. She began her tenure as justice in South Pass City, Wyoming, on 14 February 1870, serving a term of nearly 9 months. The Sweetwater County Board of County Commissioners appointed Morris as justice of the peace after the previous justice, R.S. Barr, resigned in protest of Wyoming Territory's passage of the women's suffrage amendment in December 1869.

==== Replacement with other courts ====
In many states, the office of justice of the peace has been abolished or transferred to another court, such as the magistrate court. Cases in large cities may be heard in a municipal court which has jurisdiction only within that city. Most efforts to abolish the office of justice of the peace have been led by the American Bar Association, which views non-lawyer judges as no longer necessary, as there are now far more persons with formal legal education than in the past when justices of the peace were first used.

California formerly had justice of the peace courts staffed by lay judges, but began phasing them out after a landmark 1974 decision in which the Supreme Court of California unanimously held that it was a violation of federal due process (in the state's view of the Fourteenth Amendment to the U.S. Constitution) to allow a nonlawyer to preside over a criminal trial which could result in incarceration of the defendant. The court specifically recognized that in the aftermath of Gideon v. Wainwright (1963), it was unreasonable to allow a case to be tried before a layperson incapable of understanding the legal arguments of the defense attorney to whom the defendant was entitled under Gideon. In 1994, the remaining justice courts were consolidated into the municipal courts by the passage of Proposition 191, and in 1998, the electorate passed Proposition 220, which authorized the merger of the remaining municipal courts (the only remaining courts of inferior jurisdiction) into the superior courts (the courts of general jurisdiction). However, the judges affected by each merger in each county had to affirmatively consent and the municipal court judges then had to formally become superior court judges. This process was completed on 8 February 2001, when California's last four municipal court judges were sworn in as judges of Kings County Superior Court. Under current California law, all California judges must be licensed attorneys at the time they join the bench.

In Indiana, Justices of the Peace were abolished as constitutional officers by the 1970 amendment to Article 7 of the Constitution of Indiana, approved by the voters on 3 November 1970; the office was then abolished by statute effective 1 January 1976, with its civil small-claims jurisdiction transferred to newly established small claims courts.

However, the Supreme Court of the United States held in North v. Russell, 427 U.S. 328 (1976), that the use of nonlawyer judges in Kentucky's system of police courts accords with the Fourteenth Amendment guarantees of due process and equal protection of the laws.

== See also ==
- Justices of the Peace Act
- Posse comitatus
