= Sandin v. Conner =

- Supreme Court of the United States

Decided June 19, 1995
- Full case name: Sandin v. Conner
- Citations: 515 U.S. 472 (more)

Holding
- A statute creates a liberty interest for incarcerated people only if it imposes "atypical and significant hardship" in relation to the ordinary incidents of prison life.

Court membership
- Chief Justice William Rehnquist Associate Justices John P. Stevens · Sandra Day O'Connor; Antonin Scalia · Anthony Kennedy; David Souter · Clarence Thomas; Ruth Bader Ginsburg · Stephen Breyer

Case opinions
- Majority: Rehnquist
- Dissent: Ginsburg, joined by Stevens
- Dissent: Breyer, joined by Souter

Sandin v. Conner, 515 U.S. 472 (1995), was a United States Supreme Court case in which the court held that a statute creates a liberty interest for incarcerated people only if it imposes "atypical and significant hardship" in relation to the ordinary incidents of prison life.

== Background ==
DeMont Conner alleged that Sandin and other Hawaii prison officials deprived him of procedural due process when an adjustment committee refused to allow him to present witnesses during a disciplinary hearing and then sentenced him to segregation for misconduct. The federal district court granted the officials summary judgment, but the Court of Appeals reversed, concluding that Conner had a liberty interest in remaining free of disciplinary segregation and that there was a disputed question of fact whether he had received all of the process due under Wolff v. McDonnell. The court based its conclusion on a prison regulation instructing the committee to find guilt when a misconduct charge is supported by substantial evidence, reasoning that the committee's duty to find guilt was nondiscretionary. From that regulation, it drew a negative inference that the committee may not impose segregation if it does not find substantial evidence of misconduct, that this is a state-created liberty interest, and that therefore Wolff entitled Conner to call witnesses.

== Significance ==
After Wolff, courts began recognizing more rights held by incarcerated people based on mandatory language in state regulations and statutes. Even cases like Meachum v. Fano and Olim v. Wakinekona, which allowed prison officials to send incarcerated people to any prison in the country, started their analysis in the realm of Wolff. But Sandin effectively ended that sort of analysis. Instead, courts are to look for "atypical and significant hardship" caused by the prison administrators' discretionary decisions. This standard has proved very difficult to meet.
