= North v. Russell =

- Supreme Court of the United States

Argued October 9, 1975 Decided June 28, 1976
- Full case name: Lonnie North, Appellant, v. C.B. Russell et al.
- Citations: 427 U.S. 328 (more) 96 S. Ct. 2707; 49 L. Ed. 534

Case history
- Prior: Appeal from Court of Appeals of Kentucky

Holding
- Trial before a non-judicial officer does not violate the due process or equal protection clauses of the Fourteenth Amendment provided there is a right of appeal to and a trial de novo before a lawyer-trained judge.

Court membership
- Chief Justice Warren E. Burger Associate Justices William J. Brennan Jr. · Potter Stewart; Byron White · Thurgood Marshall; Harry Blackmun · Lewis F. Powell Jr. William Rehnquist · John P. Stevens

Case opinions
- Majority: Burger, joined by White, Blackmun, Powell, Rehnquist
- Concurrence: Brennan
- Dissent: Stewart, joined by Marshall
- Stevens took no part in the consideration or decision of the case.

Laws applied
- U.S. Const. amend. XIV

North v. Russell, 427 U.S. 328 (1976), is a United States Supreme Court case which held that a non-lawyer jurist can constitutionally sit in a jail-carrying criminal case provided that the defendant has an opportunity through an appeal to obtain a second trial before a judge who is a lawyer.

== Background ==
In the American judicial system, many states have courts of limited jurisdiction, presided over by a magistrate, a justice of the peace or other non-judicial officer, who hears criminal arraignments and tries petty offenses and small civil cases. These courts are sometimes called police courts.

In July 1974, Lonnie North was convicted of a DWI charge by a police court in Kentucky. The presiding judge, C.B. Russell, was a coal miner with a high school education and without any legal training. Russell later testified that he had not received any training concerning rules of evidence and that he was not familiar with the Kentucky statutes relating to jury trials, with the Kentucky rules of criminal procedure, or with the rights guaranteed to a defendant in a criminal case under the Fourteenth Amendment.

Russell sentenced North to 30 days in jail, a sentence which he was unauthorized to impose. North was also fined $150 and had his drivers' license temporarily revoked. In Kentucky's two-tiered trial system, the first trial is a non-jury trial. If convicted, the defendant may appeal to have a jury trial and must be afforded one. In appearing for the court, North had asked for a jury trial, which, contrary to the applicable statute, was denied him.

North filed a habeas corpus petition in the district court, challenging the statutory scheme under which he had been convicted. He argued that his Fourteenth Amendment rights to due process and equal protection had been violated because he had been tried and convicted in a court presided over by a judge without legal training. The district court denied relief, as did the Kentucky Court of Appeals. The case was appealed to the Supreme Court which vacated and remanded to the appeals court on an issue of jurisdiction. The appeals court sustained the federal constitutional issue, and the case was again appealed to the Supreme Court.

== The Supreme Court's decision ==
In a 6-2 decision, the Court upheld the statute as constitutional under the Fourteenth Amendment. Chief Justice Warren Burger wrote the majority opinion. The first claim made by the appellant was that the due process clause requires a law-trained judge in all trials where confinement is a possible penalty, and that this requirement is not affected by the opportunity to obtain a trial de novo before a lawyer-trained judge. Burger contended that a court with the power to impose this penalty should be subjected to judicial scrutiny. However, the Kentucky arrangement for dealing with less serious offenses had not been shown to disadvantage the defendant any more or less than trials conducted in a court of general jurisdiction in the first instance, as long as the later was always available. Furthermore, Burger pointed to several advantages with the police court system:

Proceedings in the inferior courts are simple and speedy, and, if the results in Colten's case are any evidence, the penalty is not characteristically severe. Such proceedings offer a defendant the opportunity to learn about the prosecution's case and, if he chooses, he need not reveal his own. He may also plead guilty without a trial and promptly secure a de novo trial in a court of general criminal jurisdiction.

This line of reasoning was quoted from Colten v. Kentucky (1972), a prior Supreme Court case dealing with Kentucky's two-tier trial system. In regard to the judge's lack of legal training, Burger concluded in reference to a previous line of cases that the use of non-judicial officers to perform judicial functions was permitted insofar as "independent, neutral and detached judgement" was secured. These concerns outweighed the need for legal training.

The appellant's second claim was that the Kentucky statute violated the equal protection clause as it allowed for non-trained judges to preside in some cities of the state and not in others. This determination depended on the population size of the different cities. In response, Burger noted that all people within a given city and within cities of the same size were treated equally. Moreover, the Kentucky Court of Appeals had articulated the reasons for this classification scheme, which included varying financial resources of different cities and the power of the state to regulate its internal affairs. Burger cited Missouri v. Lewis (1880), in which the Court held that a state may establish disparate court systems in different cities, as long as all people within the classified area are treated equally. To this end, the Kentucky statute satisfied the constitutional guarantees. The appeals court decision was affirmed.

=== Concurrence ===
Justice William J. Brennan concurred in the result, but did not write separately.

=== Dissent ===
Justice Potter Stewart dissented, joined by Justice Thurgood Marshall. Stewart began by recounting the circumstances of North's conviction, and the constitutional issues it raised:

Lonnie North was haled into a Kentucky criminal court and there tried, convicted, and sentenced to a term of imprisonment by Judge C. B. Russell. Judge Russell is a coal miner without any legal training or education whatever. I believe that a trial before such a judge that results in the imprisonment of the defendant is constitutionally intolerable. It deprives the accused of his right to the effective assistance of counsel guaranteed by the Sixth and Fourteenth Amendments, and deprives him as well of due process of law.

Stewart continued by tracing the development of the right to counsel, which evolved from being afforded only in capital cases (Powell v. Alabama, 1932), to defendants charged with a felony (Gideon v. Wainwright, 1963), and finally also in trials for misdemeanors (Argersinger v. Hamlin, 1972). This evolution "firmly established that a person who has not been accorded the constitutional right to the assistance of counsel cannot be sentenced to even one day of imprisonment." But the integrity of the constitutional right, Stewart said, equally depended on the judge's competence. If the judge was ignorant of the law, the quality of counsel would be made moot:

In a trial before such a judge, the constitutional right to the assistance of counsel thus becomes a hollow mockery "a teasing illusion like a munificent bequest in a pauper's will."

Stewart noted that Russell had denied North his request of a trial by jury, despite it being clearly afforded to him by Kentucky law. Moreover, the sentence imposed on North was unauthorized by the statute. Even if no proof of incompetence could be demonstrated, Stewart contended, a sentence of imprisonment imposed by a lay judge was on its face violative of the due process clause:

(...) I think that any trial before a lay judge that results in the defendant's imprisonment violates the Due Process Clause of the Fourteenth Amendment. The Court has never required a showing of specific or individualized prejudice when it was the procedure itself that violated due process of law. "[A]t times a procedure employed by the State involves such a probability that prejudice will result that it is deemed inherently lacking in due process."

Stewart further addressed the issue of a trial de novo as a remedy of previous mistakes. He cited Ward v. Village of Monroeville (1972), in which the Court held that "the State's trial court procedure (cannot) be deemed constitutionally acceptable simply because the State eventually offers a defendant an impartial adjudication. Petitioner is entitled to a neutral and detached judge in the first instance." This case had been distinguished in the majority opinion as reflecting the need for neutral judgement on part of the judge as opposed to legal training. Stewart argued that this reasoning was untenable: "(...) surely there can be no meaningful constitutional difference between a trial that is fundamentally unfair because of the judge's possible bias, and one that is fundamentally unfair because of the judge's ignorance of the law."

Stewart criticized Burger's citing of the Colten case on the point that the defendant, to vindicate his right of a trial de novo, only had to plead guilty. This, Stewart said, assumed that the defendant had been informed of this right, would nonetheless incur the temporal and financial burden of multiple court appearances, and would "turn what should be a solemn court proceeding (...) into nothing more than a sham." Also, it would interfere with the conscience of the innocent defendant:

In short, I cannot accept the suggestion that, as a prerequisite to a constitutionally fair trial, a defendant must stand up in open court and inform a judge that he is guilty when in fact he believes that he is not.

In conclusion, Stewart cited a passage from Magna Carta:

At Runnymede in 1215 King John pledged to his barons that he would "not make any Justiciaries, Constables, Sheriffs, or Bailiffs, excepting of such as knows the laws of land . . . ." (...) Today, more than 750 years later, the Court leaves that promise unkept.

== Subsequent developments ==
Two days after announcing the decision in North v. Russell, the Court upheld a similar Massachusetts trial system in Ludwig v. Massachusetts. Edward Soto, in an essay for the Columbia Human Rights Law Review, argued that both decisions "will have far reaching effects on criminal procedure in the United States since they serve to approve many two-tier systems used in other states, several of which have recently rejected similar claims regarding their own procedures."

While this ruling was a victory for Kentucky, it ended up having little effect on the state's courts. This is because while this case was being adjudicated, Kentuckians passed an amendment to the state constitution in November 1975 that resulted in a major overhaul of the state's judicial system. One of the major tenets of this reform was the elimination of police courts and Justice of the Peace courts in local communities, replacing them with a countywide trial court of limited jurisdiction. Judges on the newly created District Courts are, similar to their counterparts on the Circuit Court (Kentucky's trial courts of general jurisdiction), required to be attorneys who are members in good standing of the Kentucky Bar. The new unified Kentucky Court of Justice, including the new District Courts, officially came into existence in 1976.
