= Massachusetts Board of Retirement v. Murgia =

- Supreme Court of the United States

Argued December 10, 1975 Decided June 25, 1976
- Full case name: Massachusetts Board of Retirement v. Murgia
- Citations: 427 U.S. 307 (more) 96 S. Ct. 2562; 49 L. Ed. 2d 520

Court membership
- Chief Justice Warren E. Burger Associate Justices William J. Brennan Jr. · Potter Stewart; Byron White · Thurgood Marshall; Harry Blackmun · Lewis F. Powell Jr. William Rehnquist · John P. Stevens

Case opinions
- Per curiam
- Dissent: Marshall
- Stevens took no part in the consideration or decision of the case.

Laws applied
- U.S. Const. amend. XIV; Mass. Gen. Laws Ann. c. 32, § 26 (3) (a) (1966)

Massachusetts Board of Retirement v. Murgia, 427 U.S. 307 (1976), was a United States Supreme Court case in which the Court held a Massachusetts law setting a mandatory retirement age of 50 for police officers was Constitutionally permissible.

== Facts ==
Robert Murgia was forcibly retired from his career as a Massachusetts police officer, based on that state's Gen. Laws Ann. c. 32, § 26 (3) (a), mandating retirement by the age of 50. Murgia brought suit against the state arguing that the law violated the Equal Protection Clause of the United States Constitution. The United States Court of Appeals for the First Circuit eventually concluded that the law lacked a rational basis in furthering state interests, and held the statute unconstitutional. The case was appealed to the Supreme Court.

== Judgment ==
In a per curiam opinion, the court held that rational basis was the appropriate standard for this question of equal protection, and that the age limit was rationally related to a legitimate state interest. As a result, the court held § 26 (3) (a) to be constitutional.

Justice Thurgood Marshall penned the lone dissent in the case, arguing that the Court's "two-tier" model of equal protection scrutiny was inappropriate and that this case should be judged under an intermediate level of scrutiny, although that term "intermediate scrutiny" was not used in the dissent. He said the following.

Today the Court holds that it is permissible for the Commonwealth of Massachusetts to declare that members of its state police force who have been proved medically fit for service are nonetheless legislatively unfit to be policemen and must be terminated involuntarily "retired" because they have reached the age of 50. Although we have called the right to work "of the very essence of the personal freedom and opportunity that it was the purpose of the (Fourteenth) Amendment to secure," Truax v. Raich, 239 U.S. 33, 41, 36 S.Ct. 7, 10, 60 L.Ed. 131 (1915), the Court finds that the right to work is not a fundamental right. And, while agreeing that "the treatment of the aged in this Nation has not been wholly free of discrimination," Ante, at 313, the Court holds that the elderly are not a suspect class. Accordingly, the Court undertakes the scrutiny mandated by the bottom tier of its two-tier equal protection framework, finds the challenged legislation not to be "wholly unrelated" to its objective, and holds, therefore, that it survives equal protection attack. I respectfully dissent.

== See also ==
- US labor law
