= The Florida Bar =

Bar association

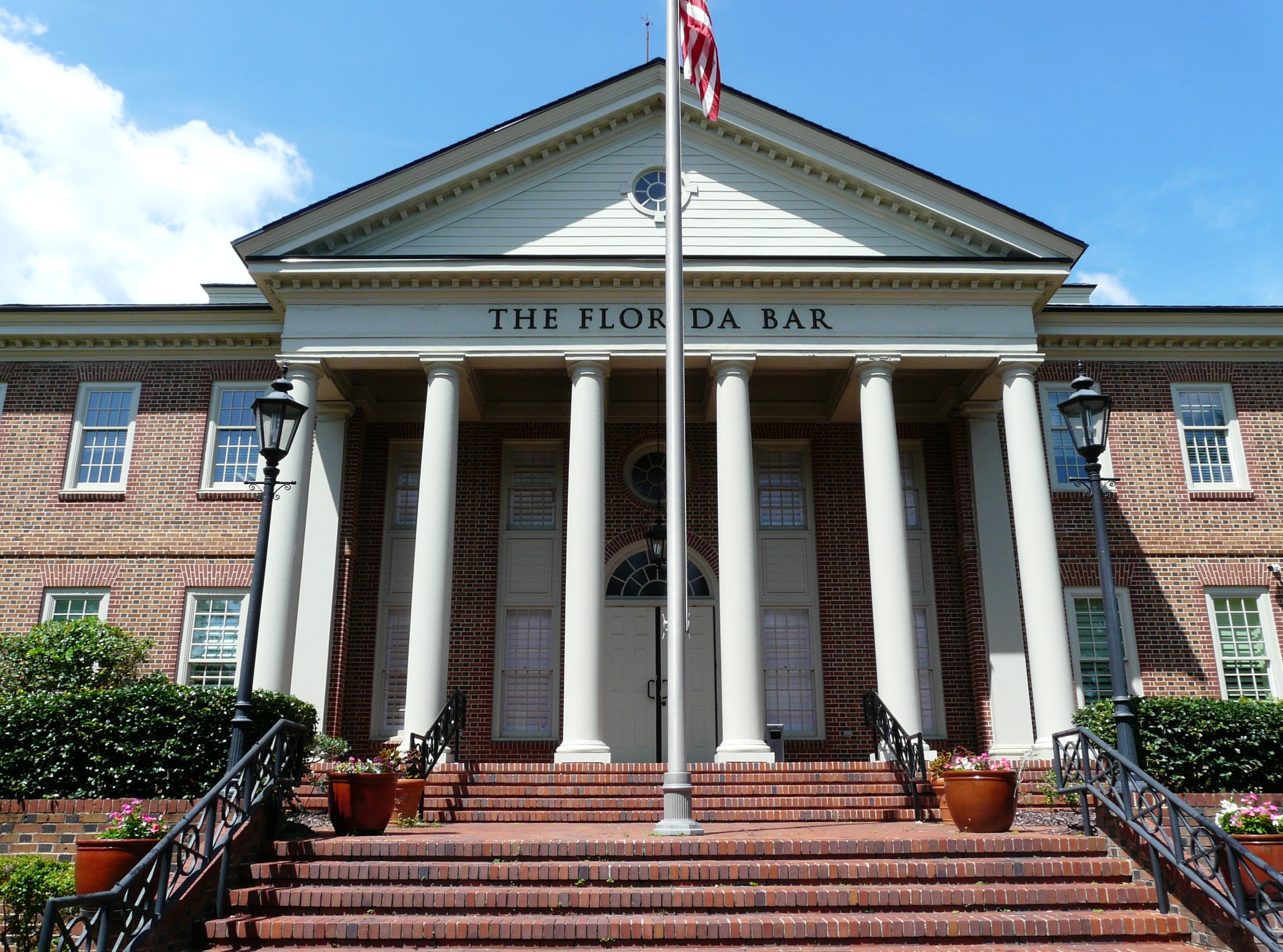
- Florida Bar headquarters in Tallahassee, Florida
- Formation: April 1950
- Type: Lawyer Regulation
- Headquarters: 651 East Jefferson Street, Tallahassee, Florida, U.S.
- Members: 116,125 (2026)
- President: Michael Fox Orr
- Key people: 52-member Board of Governors
- Website: floridabar.org

The Florida Bar is the integrated, or unified bar organization for the state of Florida. It is the third-largest such bar in the United States. Its duties include the regulation and discipline of attorneys and the governance of Florida registered paralegals.

As elsewhere in the United States, persons seeking admission to the bar must pass a moral character screening, in this case administered by the Florida Board of Bar Examiners. Admission to the bar includes passing a background investigation, the Multistate Professional Responsibility Examination, and the bar exam, which tests both the common law through the Multistate Bar Examination and Florida law through written state essays and state-specific multiple-choice questions.

The Florida Bar's headquarters building and annex are located in Tallahassee, three blocks from the Florida State Capitol. It operates under the terms of the Rules Regulating The Florida Bar.

== History ==
In 1889 the first, small, voluntary group of lawyers formed in Florida. This developed into the Florida State Bar Association in 1907. This remained a voluntary organization, publishing a legal journal, drafting court procedures, and presenting occasional educational courses for lawyers. Its membership never exceeded a few thousand.

As the number of lawyers rose after World War I, joining the Florida State Bar Association was proposed as a prerequisite to create a line of communication within the profession and introduce a mechanism for disciplining unethical lawyers. However, the Florida Supreme Court did not approve such a resolution until 1949.

In April 1950, the Florida State Bar Association met for the last time. The name was shortened to "The Florida Bar" and the state's 3,758 lawyers automatically became members. Its first president was Richard H. Hunt of Miami.

In January 2024, The Florida Bar issued ethics guidelines for attorney use of artificial intelligence (AI), as did the State Bar of California in November 2023.

== Regulation of lawyer advertising ==
Among the Bar's regulatory functions is reviewing lawyer advertising. Proposed advertisements are evaluated for compliance by the Bar's Ethics and Advertising Department, whose opinions may be appealed to the Standing Committee on Advertising and then to the Board of Governors, and a finding of compliance generally protects the advertising lawyer against discipline based on that advertisement.

Beginning in 1990, the Florida Supreme Court adopted, on the Bar's petition, a series of amendments restricting a wide range of advertising content, among them slogans, background sounds, statements characterizing the quality of a lawyer's services and references to past results; the Eleventh Circuit described the result as a long trend toward increasingly restrictive controls on attorney advertising. In 1995, the Bar successfully defended part of that framework before the Supreme Court of the United States in Florida Bar v. Went For It, Inc., which upheld a 30-day ban on targeted direct-mail solicitation of accident and disaster victims and their relatives. Other provisions did not survive review: in 2011 a federal court held void for vagueness the rules barring "manipulative" advertisements and the requirement that advertising provide only "useful, factual information", and in 2014 another court struck down the Bar's guidelines barring any reference to past results in billboard, television and radio advertising. The Florida Supreme Court adopted a comprehensively revised set of advertising rules, proposed by the Bar, in January 2013.

In August 2026, the personal injury firm Morgan & Morgan challenged Rule 4-7.15(c), which bars lawyer advertisements containing "the voice or image of a celebrity", in federal court on First Amendment and vagueness grounds; the Bar argued in response that the firm lacked standing.
