= United States v. Gaudin =

- Supreme Court of the United States

Argued April 17, 1995 Decided June 19, 1995
- Full case name: United States v. Gaudin
- Docket no.: 94-514
- Citations: 515 U.S. 506 (more) 115 S. Ct. 2310
- Argument: Oral argument

Holding
- The trial judge's refusal to submit the question of "materiality" to the jury was unconstitutional.

Court membership
- Chief Justice William Rehnquist Associate Justices John P. Stevens · Sandra Day O'Connor; Antonin Scalia · Anthony Kennedy; David Souter · Clarence Thomas; Ruth Bader Ginsburg · Stephen Breyer

Case opinion
- Majority: Scalia, joined by unanimous

Laws applied
- 18 U.S.C. § 1001, U.S Constitution

United States v. Gaudin, 516 U.S. 206 (1995) was a United States Supreme Court case in which the court held the trial judge's refusal to submit the question of "materiality" to the jury was unconstitutional. If materiality is a required element of the offense, it must be presented to the jury, which must determine it beyond a reasonable doubt for a conviction.

== Background and procedural history ==
In the 1980s, Gaudin engaged in real estate transactions using FHA-insured loans from HUD. His scheme involved inflating property appraisals, selling properties to "straw buyers," and repurchasing them for profit. Many loans defaulted, and Gaudin was charged with making false statements under 18 U.S.C. § 1001.

At trial, the United States District Court for the District of Montana instructed the jury to determine whether Gaudin's statements were false, but decided itself the issue of materiality, a requirement for conviction under §1001, ruling that materiality was not for the jury to consider. The jury convicted Gaudin.

Gaudin appealed. In 1993, the United States Court of Appeals for the Ninth Circuit reversed. On rehearing in 1994, the Court of Appeals held that taking the question of materiality from the jury violated the Fifth Amendment and Sixth Amendment of the U.S. Constitution.

== Opinion of the court ==
In June 1995, Justice Scalia delivered the opinion of the Supreme Court and affirmed the judgment of the Court of Appeals.

Relying on the Fifth and Sixth Amendments, the Court held that the Constitution provisions "require criminal convictions to rest upon a jury determination that the defendant is guilty of every element of the crime with which he is charged, beyond a reasonable doubt." The trial judge's refusal to allow the jury to determine the materiality of Gaudin's false statements infringed that right.

Chief Justice Rehnquist, Justice O'Connor, and Justice Breyer concurred.

== Subsequent developments ==
In 1996, 18 U.S.C. 1001 was amended to expressly include materiality as an element under each of the three clauses in subsection (a).

Scholars noted Gaudin is unlikely limited to 18 U.S.C. § 1001 but may apply to any other offenses in which the materiality of a false statement is an element of the offense, such as making false statements to various financial institutions.

== See also ==
- List of United States Supreme Court cases, volume 515
- List of United States Supreme Court cases by the Rehnquist Court
