= Rosenberger v. University of Virginia =

- Supreme Court of the United States

Argued March 1, 1995 Decided June 29, 1995
- Full case name: Ronald W. Rosenberger, et al., Petitioners v. Rector and Visitors of the University of Virginia, et al.
- Citations: 515 U.S. 819 (more) 115 S. Ct. 2510; 132 L. Ed. 2d 700; 1995 U.S. LEXIS 4461; 63 U.S.L.W. 4702; 95 Cal. Daily Op. Service 5005; 95 Daily Journal DAR 8512; 9 Fla. L. Weekly Fed. S 272

Case history
- Prior: Summary judgment entered for the University by the United States District Court for the Western District of Virginia, 795 F. Supp. 175 (W.D. Va. 1992); affirmed, 18 F.3d 269 (4th Cir. 1994); cert. granted, 513 U.S. 959 (1994).

Holding
- The University's denying funds available to other student publications, but not to a publication produced from a religious viewpoint, violates the First Amendment's guarantee of free speech. The University's assertion that the exclusion was necessary to avoid violating the Establishment Clause lacked merit because the funds were apportioned neutrally to any group meeting certain criteria that requested the funds.

Court membership
- Chief Justice William Rehnquist Associate Justices John P. Stevens · Sandra Day O'Connor; Antonin Scalia · Anthony Kennedy; David Souter · Clarence Thomas; Ruth Bader Ginsburg · Stephen Breyer

Case opinions
- Majority: Kennedy, joined by Rehnquist, O'Connor, Scalia, Thomas
- Concurrence: O'Connor
- Concurrence: Thomas
- Dissent: Souter, joined by Stevens, Ginsburg, Breyer

Laws applied
- U.S. Const. amend. I

Rosenberger v. Rector and Visitors of the University of Virginia, 515 U.S. 819 (1995), was an opinion by the Supreme Court of the United States regarding whether a state university might, consistent with the First Amendment, withhold from student religious publications funding provided to similar secular student publications. The University of Virginia provided funding to every student organization that met funding-eligibility criteria, which Wide Awake, the student religious publication, fulfilled. The University's defense claimed that denying student activity funding to the religious magazine was necessary to avoid the University's violating the Establishment Clause of the First Amendment.

The Supreme Court disagreed with the University; constitutional law scholar Michael W. McConnell argued on behalf of the student religious publication, and John Calvin Jeffries argued on behalf of the University of Virginia. The decision centered on the Memorial and Remonstrance Against Religious Assessments, a document on religious freedom by James Madison.

== Background ==
To fund student organization activities, the University of Virginia (UVA) charges and collects a semestral "activities fee" from the student body. Registered student organizations, including "student news, information, opinion, entertainment, or academic communications media groups," may use said funding to pay some of their expenses; ineligible UVA student activities include "religious activities, philanthropic activities, political activities, activities that would jeopardize the University's tax-exempt status, those that involve payment of honoraria or similar fees, or social or entertainment-related expenses." Moreover, the UVA student activity funding policy defines "religious activity" as one that "primarily promotes or manifests a particular belief in or about a deity or an ultimate reality." The funds were disbursed via student organization requests for reimbursement of third-party expenses, paid by the student-activities-fund administrator.

In the case of Rosenberger v. Rector and Visitors of the University of Virginia, the plaintiff was the UVA student religious magazine Wide Awake, and later the petitioner before the U.S. Supreme Court. In 1990, Ronald Rosenberger and other students founded Wide Awake, intending to "publish a magazine of philosophical and religious expression" meant to "facilitate discussion, which fosters an atmosphere of sensitivity to and tolerance of Christian viewpoints", and to "provide a unifying focus for Christians of multicultural backgrounds." The first issue of Wide Awake published articles about racism, crisis pregnancy, homosexuality, prayer, C.S. Lewis, eating disorders, and interviews with UVA instructors. The magazine was a registered student organization eligible for student activities funding, and requested some $6,000 to pay for printing the magazine. The fund administrator denied the funding, because the University classified Wide Awake magazine as a funding-ineligible religious activity, because it "promoted or manifested a particular belief in or about a deity or an ultimate reality." The editors appealed the denial to every pertinent administrator, and ultimately lost their case when the dean of students upheld the denial of student activities funds for the religious magazine Wide Awake.

Having no further recourse in the University of Virginia, Wide Awake magazine and Rosenberger asked the legal help of the Center for Individual Rights, which filed a lawsuit against UVA, under 42 U.S.C. § 1983, in the United States District Court for the Western District of Virginia, which granted summary judgement to the University, ruling that denying student activities funding to Wide Awake was neither unconstitutional content-based discrimination, nor unconstitutional viewpoint discrimination, and that the University's interest in avoiding violating the Establishment Clause justified not subsidizing the magazine. Yet, the district court did not conclusively rule on the related question of whether or not the UVA subsidizing of the student religious magazine would violate the Establishment Clause of the U.S. Constitution. Wide Awake appealed its lost case to the Fourth Circuit court, which ruled that the University had engaged in unconstitutional viewpoint discrimination, but that the University's subsidizing the religious magazine would affirmatively violate the Establishment Clause. Wide Awake then appealed the Fourth Circuit Court's decision to the U.S. Supreme Court, which agreed to review the case.

== Majority opinion ==
=== The free speech claim ===
The Government may not discriminate against a given point of view in a limited public forum, a government-created space wherein speech might occur according to the government's guidelines. "The necessity of confining a forum to the limited and legitimate purposes for which it was created may justify the State in reserving it for certain groups or for the discussion of certain topics." Yet, under the First Amendment interpretation posited in Perry Educational Association v. Perry Local Educators' Association, said government guidelines may not "regulate speech when the specific motivating ideology or the opinion or perspective of the speaker is the rationale for the restriction."

Before deciding Rosenberger v. University of Virginia, the Court's last case about the constitutionality of restrictions upon limited public fora was its decision in Lamb's Chapel v. Center Moriches Union Free School District, wherein a Christian organization sought after-hours use of public school space to show Christian child-rearing films. The Court ruled that excluding the religious organization from school installations, whilst simultaneously permitting secular groups' use of the same place for a "wide variety of social, civic, and recreational purposes," constituted viewpoint discrimination that violated the First Amendment.

The University of Virginia Student Activities Fund (SAF) constituted a limited public forum, albeit "more in a metaphysical sense than in a spatial or geographic sense," yet "By the very terms of the SAF prohibition, the University does not exclude religion as a subject matter, but selects for disfavored treatment those student journalistic efforts with religious editorial viewpoints. Religion may be a vast area of inquiry, but it also provides, as it did here, a specific premise, a perspective, a standpoint from which a variety of subjects may be discussed and considered. The prohibited perspective, not the general subject matter, resulted in the refusal to make third-party payments, for the subjects discussed were otherwise within the approved category of publications."

The University of Virginia defense distinguished between its funds-denial action and the actions tried in Lamb's Chapel v. Center Moriches Union Free School District noting that it involved the use of public school buildings, whilst the case of Rosenberger v. University of Virginia involved the use of school money. "Were the reasoning of Lamb's Chapel to apply to funding decisions as well as to those involving access to facilities, it is urged, its holding would become a judicial juggernaut, constitutionalizing the ubiquitous content-based decisions that schools, colleges, and other government entities routinely make in the allocation of public funds." The Court held that when a public school or university spends its own money to disseminate its own message, it may control the content and perspective, yet "it does not follow ... that viewpoint-based restrictions are proper when the University does not, itself, speak or subsidize transmittal of a message it favors, but instead expends funds to encourage a diversity of viewpoints from private speakers." UVA student organizations are not University agents subject to University control, and are not a University responsibility. Because the University of Virginia will pay third-party printing costs for private speakers communicating their own messages, it may not "silence the expression of selected viewpoints."

Vital First Amendment speech principles are at stake here. The first danger to liberty lies in granting the State the power to examine publications to determine whether or not they are based on some ultimate idea and, if so, for the State to classify them. The second, and corollary, danger to speech is the chilling effect of individual thought and expression. That danger is especially real in the University setting, where the State acts against a background and tradition of thought and experiment that is at the center of our intellectual and philosophic tradition. In ancient Athens, and, as Europe entered into a new period of intellectual awakening, in places like Bologna, Oxford, and Paris, universities began as voluntary and spontaneous assemblages or concourses for students to speak and to write and to learn. The quality and creative power of student intellectual life to this day remains a vital measure of a school's influence and attainment. For the University, by regulation, to cast disapproval on particular viewpoints of its students risks the suppression of free speech and creative inquiry in one of the vital centers for the Nation's intellectual life, its college and university campuses.

The Guideline invoked by the University to deny third-party contractor payments on behalf of Wide Awake effects a sweeping restriction on student thought and student inquiry in the context of University sponsored publications. The prohibition on funding on behalf of publications that "primarily promote or manifest a particular belief in or about a deity or an ultimate reality," in its ordinary and commonplace meaning, has a vast potential reach. The term "promotes" as used here would comprehend any writing advocating a philosophic position that rests upon a belief in a deity or ultimate reality. And the term "manifests" would bring within the scope of the prohibition any writing that is explicable as resting upon a premise that presupposes the extistence of a deity or ultimate reality. Were the prohibition applied with much vigor at all, it would bar funding of essays by hypothetical students such as Plato, Spinoza, and Descartes. And if the regulation covers, as the University says it does, those student journalistic efforts that primarily manifest or promote a belief that there is no deity and no ultimate reality, then undergraduates named Karl Marx, Bertrand Russell, and Jean-Paul Sartre would likewise have some of their major essays excluded from student publications. If any manifestation of beliefs in first principles disqualifies the writing, as seems to be the case, it is indeed difficult to name renowned thinkers whose writings would be accepted, save perhaps for articles disclaiming all connection to their ultimate philosophy. Plato could contrive perhaps to submit an acceptable essay on making pasta or peanut butter cookies, provided he did not point out their (necessary) imperfections.

=== The University's Establishment Clause claim ===
Although the University of Virginia appeared to concede that its Establishment Clause claim lacked merit, the majority of the Court addressed the matter, because the Fourth Circuit Court's ruling rested upon it. Government partiality towards organized religion is a necessary component of an Establishment Clause violation; in this sense, the government acts neutrally when it follows neutral criteria and policies in extending benefits to recipients representing a wide range of political and religious ideologies. The Establishment Clause does not require government to refuse free speech rights to religious organizations participating in neutral-design government programs. UVA's student activities funding design is neutral, for seeking to "open a forum for speech and to support various student enterprises, including the publication of newspapers, in recognition of the diversity and creativity of student life". Furthermore, the fact that UVA is not the speaker under this program supports the conclusion that the UVA student activities funding design does not violate the Establishment Clause, because it is unlikely that the University will be perceived as the speaker.

=== O'Connor's concurrence ===
Justice O'Connor identified the difficult aspect of Rosenberger v. University of Virginia—it lies at the "intersection of the principle of government neutrality and the prohibition on state funding of religious activities." She identified four considerations showing no Establishment Clause violation arising from UVA's potential endorsement of the religious message Wide Awake magazine might communicate. First, Wide Awake is "strictly independent" of UVA. Second, the student activities funds disbursed to it may only be used for permitted third-party reimbursements. Third, "assistance is provided to the religious publication in a context that makes improbable any perception of government endorsement of the religious message", because it also funds a "wide array of nonreligious, anti-religious and competing religious viewpoints" via the student activities fund. Fourth, students contribute the money, and students are directly involved in disbursing it under UVA administrative supervision.

=== Thomas's concurrence ===
Justice Thomas concurred with the Court majority's opinion, but separately published his historical explanation of the Establishment Clause principle that determined the Rosenberger v. University of Virginia judgment. To wit, James Madison's objection to government subsidy of organized religion in Memorial and Remonstrance Against Religious Assessments was that the taxes were solely to fund Christian churches — the unconstitutional religious partiality against which the Establishment Clause guarded the nation. The historical evidence did not, as the dissent argues, support the conclusion that "the Establishment Clause categorically condemn[s] State programs directly aiding religious activity when that aid is part of a neutral program available to a wide array of beneficiaries". That Madison's advocacy of religious neutrality led the Court majority to its judgment of Rosenberger v. University of Virginia. That, if the dissenting justices had their way, and the Establishment Clause required no government money to organized religion, then UVA could allow the Wide Awake editors to themselves print the magazine, but it could not pay for the student religious magazine's third-party printing costs. "Though our Establishment Clause jurisprudence is in hopeless disarray, this case provides an opportunity to reaffirm one basic principle that has enjoyed an uncharacteristic degree of consensus: The Clause does not compel the exclusion of religious groups from government benefits programs that are generally available to a broad class of participants."

Thomas argued in the process that "Contrary to the dissent's suggestion, Madison's objection to the assessment bill did not rest on the premise that religious entities may never participate on equal terms in neutral government programs. Nor did Madison embrace the argument that forms the linchpin of the dissent: that monetary subsidies are constitutionally different from other neutral benefits programs. Instead, Madison's comments are more consistent with the neutrality principle that the dissent inexplicably discards. According to Madison, the Virginia assessment was flawed because it 'violate[d] that equality which ought to be the basis of every law.'"

== Dissenting Opinions ==
=== Souter's dissent ===
Justice Souter began his dissenting opinion with a detailed description of the religious message of Wide Awake magazine. "Each issue of Wide Awake contained in the record makes good on the editor's promise, and echoes the Apostle's call to accept salvation ... The masthead of every issue bears St. Paul's exhortation, that the hour has come for you to awake from your slumber, because our salvation is nearer now than when we first believed". Example articles about eating disorders and racism, began with a secular perspective, but soon became religious messages decrying racism, and proclaiming that Jesus Christ alone can "provide the ultimate source of spiritual fulfillment which permeates the emotional, psychological, and physical dimensions of our lives. This writing is not merely descriptive examination of religious doctrine," nor is it "merely the expression of editorial opinion that, incidentally, coincides with Christian ethics and reflects a Christian view of human obligation. It is straightforward exhortation to enter into a relationship with God, as revealed in Jesus Christ, and to satisfy a series of moral obligations derived from the teachings of Jesus Christ."

For Souter, the University of Virginia directly subsidized religion by paying third-party printing costs for Wide Awake magazine. Such a subsidy had been understood to violate the Establishment Clause since before it was added to the Constitution in 1791. "Nearly every colony had exacted a tax for church support", and the "practice was so commonplace as to shock the freedom-loving colonials into a feeling of abhorrence". James Madison "captured the colonists' conviction that individual religious liberty could be achieved best under a government stripped of all power to tax, to support, or otherwise to assist any or all religions, or to interfere with the beliefs of any religious individual or group".

Accordingly, the UVA student activities fee was a patent violation of the principle of no direct government funding of organized religion, because the University of Virginia "exercises the power of the State to compel a student to" subsidize religion.

Why does the Court not apply this clear law to these clear facts, and conclude, as I do, that the funding scheme here is a clear constitutional violation? The answer must be, in part, that the Court fails to confront the evidence set out in the preceding section. Throughout its opinion, the Court refers uniformly to Wide Awake's Christian viewpoint or its religious perspective, and in distinguishing funding of Wide Awake from the funding of a church, the Court maintains that Wide Awake is not a religious institution, at least in the usual sense. The Court does not quote the magazine's adoption of Saint Paul's exhortation to awaken to the nearness of salvation, or any of its articles enjoining readers to accept Jesus Christ, or the religious verses, or the religious textual analyses, or the suggested prayers. And so, it is easy for the Court to lose sight of what the University students and the Court of Appeals found so obvious, and to blanch the patently and frankly evangelistic character of the magazine by unrevealing allusions to religious points of view.

To Justice Souter, the Court's analysis was contradictory—it demanded neutrality, but used an Establishment Clause analysis to support that neutrality demand.

== See also ==
- List of United States Supreme Court cases, volume 515
- List of United States Supreme Court cases by the Rehnquist Court
