= Pasadena City Board of Education v. Spangler =

- Supreme Court of the United States

Argued April 27–28, 1976 Decided June 28, 1976
- Full case name: Pasadena City Board of Education, et al. v. Spangler, et al.
- Citations: 427 U.S. 424 (more) 96 S. Ct. 2697; 49 L. Ed. 2d 599; 1976 U.S. LEXIS 77

Holding
- The District Court exceeded the limits of its power and authority in refusing to modify a desegregation order.

Court membership
- Chief Justice Warren E. Burger Associate Justices William J. Brennan Jr. · Potter Stewart; Byron White · Thurgood Marshall; Harry Blackmun · Lewis F. Powell Jr. William Rehnquist · John P. Stevens

Case opinions
- Majority: Rehnquist, joined by Burger, Stewart, White, Blackmun, Powell
- Dissent: Marshall, joined by Brennan
- Stevens took no part in the consideration or decision of the case.

Pasadena City Board of Education v. Spangler, 427 U.S. 424 (1976), was a United States Supreme Court case holding that once a school district remedies de jure racial discrimination they are not required to provide remedies for population shifts that are not caused by state discrimination.

== Background ==
Parents and students accused the Pasadena, California, school system of unconstitutional segregation. In 1970 a federal district court concluded that the policies and procedures of the Pasadena City Board of Education violated the 14th amendment. The school district complied with the court decision and submitted the "Pasadena Plan", which was approved by the District Court. The plan was implemented and in 1974 the Pasadena City Board of Education filed a motion seeking relief from the 1970 court order. The motion was denied. The Ninth Circuit affirmed the decision. The Supreme Court granted certiorari "[because] the case seemed to present issues of importance regarding the extent of a district court's authority in imposing a plan designed to achieve a unitary school system".

=== Parties and litigants ===
Phil C. Neal argued the cause for petitioners; with him on the briefs were Lee G. Paul, Peter D. Collisson, Robert G. Lane, Philip B. Kurland, and Alan L. Unikel. Fred Okrand argued the cause and filed a brief for respondents Spangler et al. Solicitor General Bork argued the cause for the United States. With him on the brief were Assistant Attorney General Pottinger, Deputy Solicitor General Wallace, and Brian K. Landsberg. Raymond B. Witt, Jr., filed a brief for the Board of Education of Chattanooga, Tenn., as amicus curiae.

=== Decision ===
The 1970 decree ordered a systemwide school reorganization plan, and a requirement that no Pasadena school would have a majority of any minority. The Pasadena Plan achieved this for one year but within a few years five of the 32 schools had over 50% black enrollment. The board of education argued that the injunction did not require accommodation of changing demographic residential patterns from year to year: ""[H]aving once implemented a racially neutral attendance pattern in order to remedy the perceived constitutional violations . . . the District Court had fully performed its function of providing the appropriate remedy for previous racially discriminatory attendance patterns." The Supreme Court concluded that the district court had exceeded its authority by requiring annual readjustment of attendance zones, and remanded to the Court of Appeals to consider the "appropriate scope of equitable relief".
