= Andresen v. Maryland =

- Supreme Court of the United States

Argued February 25, 1976 Decided June 29, 1976
- Full case name: Peter C. Andresen, Petitioner v. State of Maryland
- Citations: 427 U.S. 463 (more) 96 S. Ct. 2737; 49 L. Ed. 2d 627
- Argument: Oral argument

Case history
- Prior: Certiorari to the Court of Special Appeals of Maryland

Holding
- The searches and seizures were not "unreasonable" in violation of the Fourth Amendment.

Court membership
- Chief Justice Warren E. Burger Associate Justices William J. Brennan Jr. · Potter Stewart; Byron White · Thurgood Marshall; Harry Blackmun · Lewis F. Powell Jr. William Rehnquist · John P. Stevens

Case opinions
- Majority: Blackmun, joined by Burger, Stewart, White, Powell, Rehnquist, Stevens
- Dissent: Brennan
- Dissent: Marshall

Laws applied
- U.S. Const. amend. IV

Andresen v. Maryland, 427 U.S. 463 (1976), was a United States Supreme Court case in which the Court held that search of petitioner's offices for business records, their seizure, and subsequent introduction into evidence did not offend the Fifth Amendment's proscription that "[n]o person ... shall be compelled in any criminal case to be a witness against himself." Although the records seized contained statements that petitioner voluntarily had committed to writing, he was never required to say anything.

== See also ==
- United States v. Miller, 425 U.S. 435 (1976)
- Fisher v. United States, 425 U.S. 391 (1976)
