= Young v. American Mini Theatres, Inc. =

Young v. American Mini Theatres
- Supreme Court of the United States

Argued March 24, 1976 Decided June 24, 1976
- Full case name: Young, Mayor of Detroit, et al. v. American Mini Theatres, Incorporated, et al.
- Citations: 427 U.S. 50 (more) 96 S. Ct. 2440; 49 L. Ed. 2d 310; 1976 U.S. LEXIS 3; 1 Media L. Rep. 1151

Holding
- It is constitutional for a city to enact a zoning rule that treats ordinary cinemas differently from adult cinemas.

Court membership
- Chief Justice Warren E. Burger Associate Justices William J. Brennan Jr. · Potter Stewart; Byron White · Thurgood Marshall; Harry Blackmun · Lewis F. Powell Jr. William Rehnquist · John P. Stevens

Case opinions
- Majority: Stevens (Parts I, II), joined by Burger, White, Powell, Rehnquist
- Plurality: Stevens (Part III), joined by Burger, White, Rehnquist
- Concurrence: Powell
- Dissent: Stewart, joined by Brennan, Marshall, Blackmun
- Dissent: Blackmun, joined by Brennan, Stewart, Marshall

Laws applied
- U.S. Const. amends. I, XIV

Young v. American Mini Theatres, 427 U.S. 50 (1976), is a case in which the Supreme Court of the United States upheld a city ordinance of Detroit, Michigan that restricted the locations of adult movie theaters within the city.

== Background ==
In 1972, the city of Detroit, Michigan, amended its zoning codes to regulate the location of adult movie theaters, restricting them from opening within 1,000 feet of two other establishments with "regulated uses" (such as other adult theaters, adult book stores, cabarets, bars, taxi dance halls, and hotels) or within 500 feet of any residential area. Following adoption of the ordinance, American Mini Theaters opened two adult theaters and filed a lawsuit against city officials seeking injunctive relief and a declaratory judgment. American Mini Theaters argued that the ordinances violated the First Amendment by imposing an unconstitutional prior restraint and content-based restriction and violated the Fourteenth Amendment's Equal Protection Clause by singling out specific businesses, while also asserting the law was void for vagueness. The federal district court upheld the ordinances and granted summary judgment to the city. The United States Court of Appeals for the Sixth Circuit reversed the district court's ruling and determined the ordinances constituted a prior restraint on constitutionally protected communication and violated equal protection.

== Opinion of the Court ==
Justice Stevens (writing for the plurality) reasoned that the speech involved here is of lower value, and the city also has a compelling interest in protecting quality of life.

Justice Powell (concurring) disagreed with Stevens' "lower value speech" argument (thus limiting Part III of the opinion to a plurality), but wrote that this is only a place restriction with a limited effect on speech.

== See also ==
- List of United States Supreme Court cases, volume 427
- List of United States Supreme Court cases by the Burger Court
- List of United States Supreme Court cases involving the First Amendment
