= United States v. Agurs =

- Supreme Court of the United States

Argued April 28, 1976 Decided June 24, 1976
- Full case name: United States v. Linda Agurs
- Docket no.: 75-491
- Citations: 427 U.S. 97 (more) 96 S. Ct. 2392
- Argument: Oral argument

Case history
- Prior: 510 F.2d 1249

Holding
- A prosecutor's failure to provide defense counsel with background information that tends to support the argument that the defendant acted in self-defense does not deprive a defendant of their right to a fair trial under the Fifth Amendment.

Court membership
- Chief Justice Warren E. Burger Associate Justices William J. Brennan Jr. · Potter Stewart; Byron White · Thurgood Marshall; Harry Blackmun · Lewis F. Powell Jr. William Rehnquist · John P. Stevens

Case opinions
- Majority: Stevens, joined by Burger, Stewart, White, Blackmun, Powell, Rehnquist
- Dissent: Marshall, joined by Brennan

Laws applied
- U.S. Const. amend. V

United States v. Agurs, 427 U.S. 97 (1976), was a case heard by the Supreme Court of the United States in 1976. The case clarified the obligation of a prosecutor to provide exculpatory evidence to a criminal defendant.

== Background ==
Around 4:30 PM on September 24, 1971, James Sewell and Linda Agurs (a prostitute) checked into a motel posing as a married couple. A motel employee observed Sewell carrying a bowie knife; he also had a pocketknife in his pocket. Sewell's estranged wife testified that he was carrying $360 earlier the same day. About 15 minutes after they checked in, motel employees heard screaming coming from the room Sewell and Agurs had booked. The employees forced their way into the room and found Sewell on top of Agurs as both struggled over the bowie knife. The employees separated them and called the authorities. In the aftermath, Agurs left the motel. Sewell was declared dead at the hospital. Agurs turned herself in to the police the following day.

== Trial ==
At trial, Agurs offered no evidence. She argued that she had acted in self-defense. The jury chose a foreman, deliberated, and found Agurs guilty of second-degree murder within 25 minutes.

Three months later, Agurs' attorney filed a motion for a new trial, alleging that (1) Sewell had a criminal record that tended to prove he was a violent person, (2) that the prosecution had failed to disclose Sewell's record to Agurs' counsel, and (3) Sewell's record was admissible even if Agurs did not know about his history. The United States District Court for the District of Columbia denied the motion and the United States Court of Appeals for the District of Columbia Circuit reversed, holding that the evidence was material.

== Decision ==
Justice John Paul Stevens wrote the majority decision. The majority held that the prosecution was required to disclose "evidence creates a reasonable doubt that did not otherwise exist." The Court reasoned that since the defense did not request Sewell's arrest record, and the record could not even arguably give rise to a perjury claim, Agurs was not deprived of her right to a fair trial.

Justice Thurgood Marshall dissented, arguing that the majority's decision cabined the meaning of "materiality" so much as to place criminal defendants at a disadvantage.

== See also ==
- Brady disclosure
- United States criminal procedure
- Fifth Amendment to the United States Constitution
