= Florida Bar v. Went For It, Inc. =

- Supreme Court of the United States

Argued January 11, 1995 Decided June 21, 1995
- Full case name: Florida Bar, Petitioner v. Went For It, Inc. and John T. Blakely
- Citations: 515 U.S. 618 (more) 115 S. Ct. 2371; 132 L. Ed. 2d 541; 1995 U.S. LEXIS 4250; 63 U.S.L.W. 4644; 23 Media L. Rep. 1801; 95 Cal. Daily Op. Service 4714; 95 Daily Journal DAR 8103; 9 Fla. L. Weekly Fed. S 223

Case history
- Prior: Declaratory judgment in favor of plaintiffs, holding Florida's short-term ban on solicitation by lawyers to be unconstitutional, 808 F. Supp. 1543 (M.D. Fla. 1992), affirmed by the Eleventh Circuit, 21 F.3d 1038 (11th Cir. 1994); cert. granted, 512 U.S. 1289 (1994).

Holding
- The First Amendment allows states to prohibit lawyers from directly soliciting potential clients within 30 days of an accident or a disaster.

Court membership
- Chief Justice William Rehnquist Associate Justices John P. Stevens · Sandra Day O'Connor; Antonin Scalia · Anthony Kennedy; David Souter · Clarence Thomas; Ruth Bader Ginsburg · Stephen Breyer

Case opinions
- Majority: O'Connor, joined by Rehnquist, Scalia, Thomas, Breyer
- Dissent: Kennedy, joined by Stevens, Souter, Ginsburg

Laws applied
- U.S. Const. amend. I

Florida Bar v. Went For It, Inc., 515 U.S. 618 (1995), was a United States Supreme Court case in which the Court upheld a state's restriction on lawyer advertising under the First Amendment's commercial speech doctrine.

== Background ==
In 1989, the Florida Bar completed a two-year survey of public opinion of lawyers. It discovered that lawyers had a bad reputation stemming from their advertising activities. Accordingly, the Florida Bar proposed modifications to its rules regulating lawyer advertising in Florida. These modifications had the effect of creating a thirty-day blackout period after an accident or disaster during which lawyers were forbidden from soliciting business from the victims of such accidents or disasters, either directly or through a referral service.

On March 22, 1992, a lawyer named G. Stewart McHenry, together with a lawyer referral service he owned called Went For It, Inc., filed a suit for declaratory and injunctive relief in U.S. District Court. McHenry argued that the 30-day blackout period violated the First Amendment right to free speech, insofar as Went For It sought to contact victims of accidents and disasters within 30 days of the incident. After McHenry was disbarred for unrelated reasons, another lawyer, John Blakely, was substituted for McHenry.

Relying on Bates v. State Bar of Arizona, 433 U.S. 350 (1977), the district court entered summary judgment for Blakely and Went For It, believing that Bates compelled it to set aside the blackout period. The Eleventh Circuit affirmed on similar grounds, although it claimed to be "disturbed that Bates and its progeny required the decision" in the case. The U.S. Supreme Court accepted the Florida Bar's request that it review the case.

== Analysis ==
Advertising by lawyers is commercial speech protected by the First Amendment. The First Amendment allows states to ban commercial speech that is false or misleading. If the speech is not false or misleading, then a state may only regulate or ban the speech if it asserts a substantial interest in support of its regulation, demonstrates that the restriction directly and materially advances that interest, and shows that the regulation is narrowly drawn.

The state, through the Florida Bar, asserted that it had a "substantial interest in protecting the privacy and tranquility of personal injury victims and their loved ones against intrusive, unsolicited contact by lawyers." This interest stemmed from its perception that such solicitation "negatively affects the administration of justice," and hence also the reputation of lawyers as a whole.

In the district court, the Florida Bar had submitted a 106-page report containing "statistical and anecdotal" evidence supporting the contention that the public viewed direct-mail solicitations from lawyers soon after an accident as intrusive. In light of this evidence, the Supreme Court concluded that Florida's blackout period on direct solicitation advanced its interest in protecting the public from unwanted intrusions.

Additionally, the Court believed that the Bar's means of advancing its interest was acceptable. The Court found that the Bar's rule was" reasonably well tailored to its stated objective of eliminating targeted mailings whose type and timing are a source of distress to Floridians, distress that has caused many of them to lose respect for the legal profession."

Although Went For It had suggested that the Bar could have banned only solicitations to seriously injured citizens, the Court noted that the commercial speech test did not mandate that a state use the least restrictive means to implement its objective. Furthermore, the blackout period was brief, and there remained other ways for injured Floridians to learn about available legal services during that time.

For all these reasons, the Court ruled that the First Amendment allowed Florida to impose this blackout period on direct-mail solicitation of accident victims by lawyers.
