= United States v. Aguilar =

- Supreme Court of the United States

Decided June 21, 1995
- Full case name: United States v. Aguilar
- Citations: 515 U.S. 593 (more)

Holding
- Lying to an investigator is not obstruction of justice merely because the investigator would then testify before a grand jury; the accused must specifically intend to influence such proceedings directly.

Court membership
- Chief Justice William Rehnquist Associate Justices John P. Stevens · Sandra Day O'Connor; Antonin Scalia · Anthony Kennedy; David Souter · Clarence Thomas; Ruth Bader Ginsburg · Stephen Breyer

United States v. Aguilar, 515 U.S. 593 (1995), was a United States Supreme Court case in which the Court held that lying to an investigator is not obstruction of justice merely because the investigator would then testify before a grand jury; the accused must specifically intend to influence such proceedings directly. Additionally, the Court announced that a federal district court judge does not have a First Amendment right to disclose that a suspect's phone has been wiretapped.
