= Meachum v. Fano =

- Supreme Court of the United States

Argued April 21, 1976 Decided June 25, 1976
- Full case name: Larry Meachum, et al., v. Arthur Fano, et al.
- Citations: 427 U.S. 215 (more) 96 S.Ct. 2532, 49 L.Ed.2d 451
- Argument: Oral argument
- Opinion announcement: Opinion announcement

Case history
- Prior: Judgment in favor of plaintiffs, Fano v. Meachum, 387 F. Supp. 664 (D. Mass. 1975), affirmed, 520 F.2d 374 (1st Cir. 1975), cert granted, 423 U.S. 1013 (1975)
- Subsequent: Rehearing denied, 429 U.S. 873 (1976)

Holding
- The Due Process Clause of the Fourteenth Amendment does not entitle a duly convicted state prisoner to a factfinding hearing when he is transferred to a prison the conditions of which are substantially less favorable to him, absent a state law or practice conditioning such transfers on proof of serious misconduct or the occurrence of other specified events.

Court membership
- Chief Justice Warren E. Burger Associate Justices William J. Brennan Jr. · Potter Stewart; Byron White · Thurgood Marshall; Harry Blackmun · Lewis F. Powell Jr. William Rehnquist · John P. Stevens

Case opinions
- Majority: White, joined by Burger, Stewart, Blackmun, Powell, Rehnquist
- Dissent: Stevens, joined by Brennan, Marshall

Laws applied
- Due Process Clause

Meachum v. Fano, 427 U.S. 215 (1976), is a 1976 United States Supreme Court case concerning the due process rights of prisoners. In this case, the Court held 6–3 that the Due Process Clause of the Fourteenth Amendment did not grant a prisoner a right to a fact-finding hearing when he was transferred to a new facility, even if it had significantly more unfavorable conditions compared to his previous facility. Justice Byron White wrote the majority opinion, and John Paul Stevens wrote the dissenting opinion.

== Effects ==
Based on this decision, federal courts also began to hold that interstate transfers also did not implicate due process concerns. The Supreme Court adopted this view in Olim v. Wakinekona (1983).
