= Olim v. Wakinekona =

- Supreme Court of the United States

Decided April 26, 1983
- Full case name: Olim v. Wakinekona
- Citations: 461 U.S. 238 (more)

Holding
- Incarcerated people do not have a due process right to choose the prison in which they are held, even if they are transferred to a prison across the ocean.

Court membership
- Chief Justice Warren E. Burger Associate Justices William J. Brennan Jr. · Byron White; Thurgood Marshall · Harry Blackmun; Lewis F. Powell Jr. · William Rehnquist; John P. Stevens · Sandra Day O'Connor

Case opinions
- Majority: Blackmun
- Dissent: Marshall, joined by Brennan; Stevens (Part I)

Laws applied
- Due Process Clause

Olim v. Wakinekona, 461 U.S. 238 (1983), was a United States Supreme Court case in which the court held that incarcerated people do not have a due process right to choose the prison in which they are held, even if they are transferred to a prison across the ocean.

== Background ==
Early governments within the United States explicitly prohibited banishment as a punishment because the colonists considered the English practice to be cruel. After the invention of the car, there was a nation-wide moral panic about interstate crime, which prompted many expansions of police power across state lines. Prison administrators in several states began to discuss how to exchange imprisoned people in the name of prison efficiency. For example, an overcrowded prison system could send incarcerated people to a different system with extra space. States formed interstate compacts under the Compact Clause to normalize this sort of transfer. At the same time, courts began to hold that incarcerated people did not have a due process right to be confined in any particular prison within the convicting state, and the Supreme Court adopted that view in Meachum v. Fano (1976).

Delbert Kaahanui Wakinekona was a resident of Hawaii convicted of crimes committed within Hawaii. He was transferred across the Pacific Ocean to serve his time in California, away from all of his family and friends.

== Decision ==
Justice Blackmun wrote the majority opinion, in which he announced that involuntary interstate prison transfers did not violate due process and were not unusual.

Justice Marshall dissented.

== Aftermath ==
Interstate prison transfers were and remain relatively rare. Most states transfer less than three percent of their incarcerated people this way, and many transfer less than one percent. However, because the United States has the largest prison population in the world, these transfers affect thousands of incarcerated people. Hawaii leads the country in this practice, sending more than half of its prison population to the mainland. Vermont is another outlier. These states have reputations for compassionate prison conditions within their borders, but they regularly export incarcerated people to serve time in states with laxer regulations, often in private prisons. There are prisons in other states set up specifically to house incarcerated people from Vermont. In response to calls to reduce prison populations, Vermont and other states with similar reputations have exported prisoners instead of doing that.

In practice, interstate prison transfers are at the nigh-unlimited discretion of prison administrators. Prisons regularly trade prisoners for other prisoners or cash payments.

Many states' constitutions have or once had so-called "transportation clauses" that prohibit the government from punishing people convicted of crimes within the state by sending them outside the territory of the state. The practice of interstate prison transfers has been challenged under these clauses. Courts in almost all states where this has been raised have read these clauses narrowly as prohibitions of banishment and have upheld current prison policy by distinguishing the practice of sending people to be held in prisons within other states from forcing people to leave the state. The exception is West Virginia, where interstate prison transfers are considered unconstitutional.
