= List of United States Supreme Court cases, volume 515 =

This is a list of all United States Supreme Court cases from volume 515 of the United States Reports:

Case name	Citation	Date decided
Nebraska v. Wyoming	515 U.S. 1	1995
North Star Steel Co. v. Thomas	515 U.S. 29	1995
Garlotte v. Fordice	515 U.S. 39	1995
Reno v. Koray	515 U.S. 50	1995
Missouri v. Jenkins	515 U.S. 70	1995
Ryder v. United States	515 U.S. 177	1995
Milwaukee v. Cement Div., National Gypsum Co.	515 U.S. 189	1995
Adarand Constructors, Inc. v. Peña	515 U.S. 200	1995
Wilton v. Seven Falls Co.	515 U.S. 277	1995
Metropolitan Stevedore Co. v. Rambo	515 U.S. 291	1995
Johnson v. Jones	515 U.S. 304	1995
Kimberlin v. Quinlan	515 U.S. 321	1995
Commissioner v. Schleier	515 U.S. 323	1995
Chandris, Inc. v. Latsis	515 U.S. 347	1995
Witte v. United States	515 U.S. 389	1995
Using "relevant conduct", as defined by the Federal Sentencing Guidelines, at sentencing does not violate double jeopardy principles.
Gutierrez de Martinez v. Lamagno	515 U.S. 417	1995
Oklahoma Tax Comm'n v. Chickasaw Nation	515 U.S. 450	1995
Sandin v. Conner	515 U.S. 472	1995
United States v. Gaudin	515 U.S. 506	1995
Vimar Seguros y Reaseguros, S. A. v. M/V Sky Reefer	515 U.S. 528	1995
Hurley v. Irish-American Gay, Lesbian and Bisexual Group of Boston, Inc.	515 U.S. 557	1995
National Private Truck Council, Inc. v. Oklahoma Tax Comm'n	515 U.S. 582	1995
United States v. Aguilar	515 U.S. 593	1995
Florida Bar v. Went For It, Inc.	515 U.S. 618	1995
Vernonia School Dist. 47J v. Acton	515 U.S. 646	1995
Babbitt v. Sweet Home Chapter, Communities for Great Ore.	515 U.S. 687	1995
United States v. Hays	515 U.S. 737	1995
Capitol Square Review and Advisory Bd. v. Pinette	515 U.S. 753	1995
Rosenberger v. University of Virginia	515 U.S. 819	1995
Miller v. Johnson	515 U.S. 900	1995
Netherland v. Tuggle	515 U.S. 951	1995
