= List of United States Supreme Court cases, volume 427 =

This is a list of all the United States Supreme Court cases from volume 427 of the United States Reports:

Case name	Citation	Date decided
Aldinger v. Howard	427 U.S. 1	1976
A non-federal claim that shares a common nucleus of operative facts with federal claims is not a proper basis for joining a party to a federal case when there no independent basis for federal jurisdiction over that party.
United States v. Santana	427 U.S. 38	1976
Young v. American Mini Theatres, Inc.	427 U.S. 50	1976
United States v. Agurs	427 U.S. 97	1976
United States v. Hopkins	427 U.S. 123	1976
Machinists v. Wis. Employment Relations Comm'n	427 U.S. 132	1976
Runyon v. McCrary	427 U.S. 160	1976
Meachum v. Fano	427 U.S. 215	1976
Montanye v. Haymes	427 U.S. 236	1976
Union Elec. Co. v. EPA	427 U.S. 246	1976
McDonald v. Santa Fe Trail Transp. Co.	427 U.S. 273	1976
New Orleans v. Dukes	427 U.S. 297	1976
Massachusetts Board of Retirement v. Murgia	427 U.S. 307	1976
North v. Russell	427 U.S. 328	1976
Elrod v. Burns	427 U.S. 347	1976
Kleppe v. Sierra Club	427 U.S. 390	1976
Pasadena City Bd. of Ed. v. Spangler	427 U.S. 424	1976
Fitzpatrick v. Bitzer	427 U.S. 445	1976
Utah v. United States	427 U.S. 461	1976
Andresen v. Maryland	427 U.S. 463	1976
Mathews v. Lucas	427 U.S. 495	1976
Norton v. Mathews	427 U.S. 524	1976
Nebraska Press Ass'n v. Stuart	427 U.S. 539	1976
Ludwig v. Massachusetts	427 U.S. 618	1976
NHL v. Metro. Hockey Club, Inc.	427 U.S. 639	1976
