= Ludwig v. Massachusetts =

- Supreme Court of the United States

Argued April 26, 1976 Decided June 30, 1976
- Full case name: Richard I. Ludwig v. Commonwealth of Massachusetts
- Citations: 427 U.S. 618 (more) 96 S. Ct. 2781; 49 L. Ed. 2d 732; 1976 U.S. LEXIS 1

Case history
- Prior: Commonwealth v. Ludwig, 368 Mass. 138, 330 N.E.2d 467 (1975); probable jurisdiction noted, 423 U.S. 945 (1975).

Holding
- Where a defendant was tried in the lower-trial court, that had no right to a jury, and then appealed to the higher court, whose proceedings would be held de novo with a jury, there was no violation of the right to jury or violation of double jeopardy upon proceedings in the higher tier of the trial court.

Court membership
- Chief Justice Warren E. Burger Associate Justices William J. Brennan Jr. · Potter Stewart; Byron White · Thurgood Marshall; Harry Blackmun · Lewis F. Powell Jr. William Rehnquist · John P. Stevens

Case opinions
- Majority: Blackmun, joined by Burger, White, Powell, Rehnquist
- Concurrence: Powell
- Dissent: Stevens, joined by Brennan, Stewart, Marshall

Laws applied
- U.S. Const., Amend. VI U.S. Const., Amend. XIV, U.S. Const., Amend. V,

Ludwig v. Massachusetts, 427 U.S. 618 (1976), was a case in which the Supreme Court of the United States held that the Massachusetts two-tier court system did not deprive Ludwig of his U.S. Const., Amend. XIV right to a jury trial and did not violate the double jeopardy clause of the U.S. Const., Amend. V.

== Facts of the Case ==
On February 1, 1974, in the District Court of Northern Norfolk, Ludwig was charged with operating a motor vehicle “negligently . . . so that the lives and safety of the public might be endangered.” At the commencement of trial, Ludwig moved for a “speedy trial by jury,” citing the Fifth and Sixth Amendments. The motion was denied, and, after a brief trial, the court adjudged Ludwig guilty and imposed a fine of $20. Thereafter, Ludwig asserted his statutory right to a trial De novo before a six-man jury in the District Court. In the De novo proceeding, Ludwig filed a “motion to dismiss” on the grounds that he had been deprived of his federal constitutional right to a speedy jury trial in the first instance, and that he had been subjected to double jeopardy. The motion was denied. At the second trial, Ludwig waived a jury and, after trial by the court, again was adjudged guilty, and again was fined $20. Ludwig appealed to the Supreme Judicial Court of Massachusetts, which affirmed the decision of the trial court. The Massachusetts Court held that Ludwig was not deprived of his right to a jury trial nor was he twice put in jeopardy.

== Analysis of the Court ==
Ludwig raised two issues on appeal, both of which the Supreme Court of the United States reasoned separately.

=== Right to Jury ===
The Court determined whether Ludwig’s right to a jury trial was infringed by first viewing the right in light of the common-law protection. The right to a jury trial, at common law, was reserved to serious criminal cases. In determining the scope of that right in state proceedings, the Court stated that the “Fourteenth Amendment guarantees a right of jury trial in all criminal cases which were they to be tried in a federal court would come within the Sixth Amendment's guarantee.” Therefore, only when an accused is charged with a “petty” offense, usually defined by reference to the maximum punishment that might be imposed, does the Constitution permit the Federal Government and the State to deprive a defendant of his liberty without affording him an opportunity to have his guilt determined by a jury.

The Court had previously held that a jury of 12 is not essential to the right. It additionally held that the jury's verdict need not be unanimous. What is important is that a majority verdict consists of “a group of laymen representative of a cross section of the community who have the duty and the opportunity to deliberate, free from outside attempts at intimidation, on the question of a defendant's guilt.”

There is no question that Ludwig’s right to a jury trial was intact. The Massachusetts courts provide a jury for all serious offenses and provides a jury upon appeal from the lower court’s decision.

=== Double Jeopardy ===
The protection afforded by the principle of double jeopardy as a function of three related common-law pleas: Autrefois acquit, autrefois convict, and pardon. Only autrefois convict was at issue in the case. Ludwig was initially convicted. He argued that he could not be retried when he informed the trial court of his decision to “appeal” and to secure a trial De novo.

The decision to secure a new trial rests with the accused alone. A defendant who elects to be tried De novo in Massachusetts is in no different position than is a convicted defendant who successfully appeals on the basis of the trial record and gains a reversal of his conviction and a remand of his case for a new trial.

The only difference between an appeal on the record and an appeal resulting automatically in a new trial is that a convicted defendant in Massachusetts may obtain a “reversal” and a new trial without assignment of error in the proceedings at his first trial. Nothing in the Double Jeopardy Clause prohibits a State from affording a defendant two opportunities to avoid conviction and secure an acquittal.

== See also ==
- List of United States Supreme Court cases, volume 427
- List of United States Supreme Court cases
- Lists of United States Supreme Court cases by volume
- List of United States Supreme Court cases by the Burger Court
