= 2004 term opinions of the Supreme Court of the United States =

October 2004 to October 2005 opinions

The 2004 term of the Supreme Court of the United States began October 4, 2004, and concluded October 3, 2005. The table illustrates which opinion was filed by each justice in each case and which justices joined each opinion.

== Table key ==
Delivered the court's opinion

Joined the court's opinion

Filed a concurrence

Joined a concurrence

Filed a dissent

Joined a dissent

Filed a concurrence/dissent

Joined a concurrence/dissent

Did not participate in the decision
- Decisions that do not note an argument date were decided without oral argument. Decisions that do not note a justice delivering the court's opinion are per curiam.
- Multiple concurrences and dissents within a case are numbered, with joining votes numbered accordingly. Justices frequently join multiple opinions in a single case; each vote is subdivided accordingly.
- An asterisk ( * ) in the court's opinion denotes that it was only a majority in part or a plurality. An asterisk in a joining vote denotes that the justice joined it only in part.
- A dash ( - ) denotes that the justice voted without filing or joining an opinion.

== 2004 term opinions ==
#	Case name and citation	Argued	Decided	Rehnquist	Stevens	O'Connor	Scalia	Kennedy	Souter	Thomas	Ginsburg	Breyer
1	Leocal v. Ashcroft, 543 U.S. 1	October 12, 2004	November 9, 2004									
2	Norfolk Southern Ry. v. James N. Kirby, Pty Ltd., 543 U.S. 14	October 6, 2004	November 9, 2004									
3	Smith v. Texas, 543 U.S. 37		November 15, 2004									
4	Koons Buick Pontiac GMC, Inc. v. Nigh, 543 U.S. 50	October 5, 2004	November 30, 2004	2	1			2		3		1
5	City of San Diego v. Roe, 543 U.S. 77		December 6, 2004									
6	Kansas v. Colorado, 543 U.S. 86	October 4, 2004	December 7, 2004		*					*		
7	KP Permanent Make-Up, Inc. v. Lasting Impression I, Inc., 543 U.S. 111	October 5, 2004	December 8, 2004				*					*
8	Kowalski v. Tesmer, 543 U.S. 125	October 4, 2004	December 13, 2004									
9	Devenpeck v. Alford, 543 U.S. 146	November 8, 2004	December 13, 2004									
10	Cooper Indus. v. Aviall Servs., 543 U.S. 157	October 6, 2004	December 13, 2004									
11	Florida v. Nixon, 543 U.S. 175	November 2, 2004	December 13, 2004									
12	Brosseau v. Haugen, 543 U.S. 194		December 13, 2004									
13	Whitfield v. United States, 543 U.S. 209	November 30, 2004	January 11, 2005									
14	United States v. Booker, 543 U.S. 220	October 4, 2004	January 12, 2005	2 / 4	1 / 1	2 / 4	1 / 1* / 2	2 / 4	1 / 1	1 / 3	1 / 2	2 / 4
15	Jama v. Immigration & Customs Enforcement, 543 U.S. 335	October 12, 2004	January 12, 2005									
16	Clark v. Martinez, 543 U.S. 371	October 13, 2004	January 12, 2005	*								
17	Illinois v. Caballes, 543 U.S. 405	November 10, 2004	January 24, 2005						1 / 2		2	
18	Commissioner of Internal Revenue v. Banks, 543 U.S. 426	November 1, 2004	January 24, 2005									
19	Howell v. Mississippi, 543 U.S. 440	November 29, 2004	January 24, 2005									
20	Bell v. Cone, 543 U.S. 447		January 24, 2005									
21	Smith v. Massachusetts, 543 U.S. 462	December 1, 2004	February 22, 2005									
22	Stewart v. Dutra Construction Co., 543 U.S. 481	November 1, 2004	February 22, 2005									
23	Johnson v. California, 543 U.S. 499	November 2, 2004	February 23, 2005		1		2			2		
24	Roper v. Simmons, 543 U.S. 551	October 13, 2004	March 1, 2005	2		1	2			2		
25	Cherokee Nation v. Leavitt, 543 U.S. 631	November 9, 2004	March 1, 2005									
26	Tenet v. Doe, 544 U.S. 1	January 11, 2005	March 2, 2005		1		2				1	
27	Shepard v. United States, 544 U.S. 13	November 8, 2004	March 7, 2005						*	*		
28	Ballard v. Comm'r, 544 U.S. 40	December 7, 2004	March 7, 2005									
29	Wilkinson v. Dotson, 544 U.S. 74	December 6, 2004	March 7, 2005									
30	Muehler v. Mena, 544 U.S. 93	December 8, 2004	March 22, 2005		1			2	1		1	1
31	Rancho Palos Verdes v. Abrams, 544 U.S. 113	January 19, 2005	March 22, 2005		1	2			2		2	2
32	Brown v. Payton, 544 U.S. 133	November 10, 2004	March 22, 2005				1			1		2
33	Jackson v. Birmingham Board of Education, 544 U.S. 167	November 30, 2004	March 29, 2005									
34	City of Sherrill v. Oneida Indian Nation, 544 U.S. 197	January 11, 2005	March 29, 2005									
35	Smith v. City of Jackson, 544 U.S. 228	November 3, 2004	March 30, 2005		*	1	* / 2	1		1		
36	Rhines v. Weber, 544 U.S. 269	January 12, 2005	March 30, 2005		1				2		1 / 2	1 / 2
37	Exxon Mobil Corp. v. Saudi Basic Indus. Corp., 544 U.S. 280	February 23, 2005	March 30, 2005									
38	Johnson v. United States, 544 U.S. 295	January 18, 2005	April 4, 2005									
39	Rousey v. Jacoway, 544 U.S. 320	December 1, 2004	April 4, 2005									
40	Dura Pharmaceuticals v. Broudo, 544 U.S. 336	January 12, 2005	April 19, 2005									
41	Pasquantino v. United States, 544 U.S. 349	November 9, 2004	April 26, 2005				*		*			
42	Small v. United States, 544 U.S. 385	November 3, 2004	April 26, 2005									
43	Pace v. DiGuglielmo, 544 U.S. 408	February 28, 2005	April 27, 2005									
44	Bates v. Dow Agrosciences, L.L.C., 544 U.S. 431	January 10, 2005	April 27, 2005									
45	Granholm v. Heald, 544 U.S. 460	December 7, 2004	May 16, 2005	2	1 / 2	1 / 2				2		
46	Lingle v. Chevron U.S.A., Inc., 544 U.S. 528	February 22, 2005	May 23, 2005									
47	Johanns v. Livestock Mktg. Ass'n, 544 U.S. 550	December 8, 2004	May 23, 2005		2			1 / 2	2	1	2	3
48	Clingman v. Beaver, 544 U.S. 581	January 19, 2005	May 23, 2005			*			*	*		* / *
49	Deck v. Missouri, 544 U.S. 581	March 1, 2005	May 23, 2005									
50	Medellín v. Dretke, 544 U.S. 660	March 28, 2005	May 23, 2005		1 / 3	1	*		1 / 2			1 / 3
51	Arthur Andersen LLP v. United States, 544 U.S. 696	April 27, 2005	May 31, 2005									
52	Cutter v. Wilkinson, 544 U.S. 709	March 21, 2005	May 31, 2005									
53	Tory v. Cochran, 544 U.S. 734	March 22, 2005	May 31, 2005									
54	Gonzales v. Raich, 545 U.S. 1	November 29, 2004	June 6, 2005	1*		1				1* / 2		
55	Alaska v. United States, 545 U.S. 75	January 10, 2005	June 6, 2005	*			*			*		
56	Spector v. Norwegian Cruise Line Ltd., 545 U.S. 119	February 28, 2005	June 6, 2005					*		* / *	*	*
57	Johnson v. California, 545 U.S. 162	April 18, 2005	June 13, 2005									
58	Bradshaw v. Stumpf, 545 U.S. 175	April 19, 2005	June 13, 2005				2		1	2	1	
59	Merck KGaA v. Integra Lifesciences I, Ltd., 545 U.S. 193	April 20, 2005	June 13, 2005									
60	Wilkinson v. Austin, 545 U.S. 209	March 30, 2005	June 13, 2005									
61	Miller-El v. Dretke, 545 U.S. 231	December 6, 2004	June 13, 2005									
62	Grable & Sons Metal Prod. v. Darue Engineering, 545 U.S. 308	April 18, 2005	June 13, 2005									
63	San Remo Hotel, L.P. v. City & County of San Francisco, 545 U.S. 323	March 28, 2005	June 20, 2005									
64	Dodd v. United States, 545 U.S. 353	March 22, 2005	June 20, 2005		1				1*		1* / 2	1* / 2
65	Rompilla v. Beard, 545 U.S. 374	January 18, 2005	June 20, 2005									
66	Graham Cty. Soil & Water Consv. Dist. v. United States ex rel. Wilson, 545 U.S. 409	April 20, 2005	June 20, 2005						*			
67	Am. Trucking Ass'ns v. Mich. PSC, 545 U.S. 429	April 26, 2005	June 20, 2005				1			2		
68	Mid-Con Freight Sys. v. Mich. PSC, 545 U.S. 440	April 26, 2005	June 20, 2005									
69	Kelo v. City of New London, 545 U.S. 469	February 22, 2005	June 23, 2005	1		1	1			1 / 2		
70	Gonzalez v. Crosby, 545 U.S. 524	April 25, 2005	June 23, 2005									
71	Exxon Mobil Corp. v. Allapattah Servs., 545 U.S. 546	March 1, 2005	June 23, 2005		1 / 2	2					2	1 / 2
72	Orff v. United States, 545 U.S. 596	February 23, 2005	June 23, 2005									
73	Halbert v. Michigan, 545 U.S. 605	April 25, 2005	June 23, 2005	*								
74	Mayle v. Felix, 545 U.S. 644	April 19, 2005	June 23, 2005									
75	Van Orden v. Perry, 545 U.S. 677	March 2, 2005	June 27, 2005	*	1 / 3	2	1		3	2	1 / 3	3
76	Town of Castle Rock v. Gonzales, 545 U.S. 748	March 21, 2005	June 27, 2005									
77	Bell v. Thompson, 545 U.S. 794	April 26, 2005	June 27, 2005									
78	McCreary County v. ACLU, 545 U.S. 844	March 2, 2005	June 27, 2005					*				
79	Metro-Goldwyn-Mayer Studios, Inc. v. Grokster, Ltd., 545 U.S. 913	March 29, 2005	June 27, 2005	1	2	2		1			1	2
80	Nat'l Cable & Telecomms. Ass'n v. Brand X Internet Servs., 545 U.S. 967	March 29, 2005	June 27, 2005		1				*		*	2
#	Case name and citation	Argued	Decided	Rehnquist	Stevens	O'Connor	Scalia	Kennedy	Souter	Thomas	Ginsburg	Breyer

== 2004 term membership and statistics ==
This was the nineteenth and final term of Chief Justice Rehnquist's tenure, as he died on September 3, 2005. It was the eleventh and final consecutive term in which the Court's membership had not changed.

Justice		Appointment history		Agreement with judgment		Opinions filed				
Seniority	Name	President	Date confirmed	%	#					Total
Chief Justice	William Rehnquist	Richard Nixon	January 7, 1972	76.8%	53/69	7	1	0	1	9
Associate Justice	John Paul Stevens	Gerald Ford	December 19, 1975	72.5%	58/80	8	8	1	12	29
Associate Justice	Sandra Day O'Connor	Ronald Reagan	September 25, 1981	86.3%	69/80	8	5	0	6	19
Associate Justice	Antonin Scalia	Ronald Reagan	September 26, 1986	75%	60/80	9	8	1	7	25
Associate Justice	Anthony Kennedy	Ronald Reagan	February 18, 1988	86.3%	69/80	9	5	0	5	19
Associate Justice	David Souter	George H. W. Bush	October 9, 1990	80%	64/80	8	4	0	7	19
Associate Justice	Clarence Thomas	George H. W. Bush	October 23, 1991	73.8%	59/80	8	10	2	13	33
Associate Justice	Ruth Bader Ginsburg	Bill Clinton	August 10, 1993	78.8%	63/80	8	6	0	7	21
Associate Justice	Stephen Breyer	Bill Clinton	August 3, 1994	86.3%	69/80	10	11	0	4	25
Notes on statistics: Opinion counts only include the bench opinions listed above; opinions relating to orders or in-chambers opinions are not included.; Agreement with the Court's judgment does not guarantee agreement with the reasoning expressed in its opinion. A justice is not considered in agreement if they dissented even in part. Agreement percentages are based only on the listed cases in which a justice participated and are rounded to the nearest one-tenth of one percentage point.						Totals				
Notes on statistics: Opinion counts only include the bench opinions listed above; opinions relating to orders or in-chambers opinions are not included.; Agreement with the Court's judgment does not guarantee agreement with the reasoning expressed in its opinion. A justice is not considered in agreement if they dissented even in part. Agreement percentages are based only on the listed cases in which a justice participated and are rounded to the nearest one-tenth of one percentage point.						75	58	4	62	199
