= Superfund =

US federal program

Comprehensive Environmental Response, Compensation, and Liability Act of 1980
- Long title: An act to provide for liability, compensation, cleanup, and emergency response for hazardous substances released into the environment and the cleanup of inactive hazardous waste disposal sites.
- Acronyms (colloquial): CERCLA
- Nicknames: Superfund
- Enacted by: the 96th United States Congress

Citations
- Public law: P.L. 96-510
- Statutes at Large: 94 Stat. 2767

Codification
- Titles amended: 42 (Public Health)
- U.S.C. sections created: 42 U.S.C. § 9601 et seq.

Legislative history
- Introduced in the House as "Hazardous Waste Containment Act of 1980" (H.R. 7020) by James Florio (D–NJ) on April 2, 1980; Committee consideration by House Interstate and Foreign Commerce, House Ways and Means, Senate Environment, Senate Finance; Passed the House on September 23, 1980 (351–23); Passed the Senate on November 24, 1980 (78-9) with amendment; House agreed to Senate amendment on December 3, 1980 (274–94); Signed into law by President Jimmy Carter on December 11, 1980

Major amendments
- Superfund Amendments and Reauthorization Act of 1986; Emergency Planning and Community Right-to-Know Act of 1986; Small Business Liability Relief and Brownfields Revitalization Act

United States Supreme Court cases
- Exxon Corp. v. Hunt, 475 U.S. 355 (1986); Pennsylvania v. Union Gas Co., 491 U.S. 1 (1989); Key Tronic Corp. v. United States, 511 U.S. 809 (1994); United States v. Bestfoods, 524 U.S. 51 (1998); Cooper Industries, Inc. v. Aviall Services, Inc., 543 U.S. 157 (2004); United States v. Atlantic Research Corp., 551 U.S. 128 (2007); Burlington N. & S. F. R. Co. v. United States, 556 U.S. 599 (2009); CTS Corp. v. Waldburger, 573 U.S. 1 (2014); Atlantic Richfield v. Christian, No. 17-1498, 590 U.S. ___ (2020); Guam v. United States, No. 20-382, 593 U.S. ___ (2021)

Superfund is a United States federal environmental remediation program established by the Comprehensive Environmental Response, Compensation, and Liability Act of 1980 (CERCLA). The program is administered by the Environmental Protection Agency (EPA) and is designed to pay for investigating and cleaning up sites contaminated with hazardous substances. Sites managed under this program are referred to as Superfund sites. The EPA seeks to identify parties responsible for hazardous substances released to the environment (polluters) and either compel them to clean up the sites, or it may undertake the cleanup on its own using the Superfund (a trust fund), seeking to recover those costs from the responsible parties through settlements or other legal means. The EPA and state agencies use the Hazard Ranking System (HRS) to calculate a site score (ranging from 0 to 100) based on the actual or potential release of hazardous substances from a site. A score of 28.5 results in a site being placed on the National Priorities List, eligible for long-term, remedial action (i.e., cleanup) under the Superfund program. Sites on the NPL are considered the most highly contaminated and undergo longer-term remedial investigation and remedial action (cleanups). The state of New Jersey, the fifth smallest state in the U.S., disproportionately contains about ten percent of the priority Superfund sites. As of March 13, 2026, there were 1,343 sites listed; an additional 460 had been deleted, and 37 new sites have been proposed on the NPL.

Approximately 70% of Superfund cleanup activities historically have been paid for by the potentially responsible parties (PRPs), reflecting the polluter pays principle. However, 30% of the time, the responsible party either cannot be found or is unable to pay for the cleanup. In these circumstances, taxpayers had been paying for the cleanup operations. Through the 1980s, most of the funding came from an excise tax on petroleum and chemical manufacturers. However, in 1995, Congress chose not to renew this tax and the burden of the cost was shifted to taxpayers in the general public. Since 2001, most of the cleanup of hazardous waste sites has been funded through taxpayers generally. Despite its name, the program suffered from under-funding, and by 2014 Superfund NPL cleanups had decreased to only 8 sites, out of over 1,200. In November 2021, the Infrastructure Investment and Jobs Act reauthorized an excise tax on chemical manufacturers, for ten years starting in July 2022.

Superfund also authorizes natural resource trustees, which may be federal, state, and/or tribal, to perform a Natural Resource Damage Assessment (NRDA). Natural resource trustees determine and quantify injuries caused to natural resources through either releases of hazardous substances or cleanup actions and then seek to restore ecosystem services to the public through conservation, restoration, and/or acquisition of equivalent habitat. Responsible parties are assessed damages for the cost of the assessment and the restoration of ecosystem services. For the federal government, the EPA, US Fish and Wildlife Service, or the National Oceanic and Atmospheric Administration may act as natural resource trustees. The US Department of Interior keeps a list of the natural resource trustees appointed by state's governors. Federally recognized Tribes may act as trustees for natural resources, including natural resources related to Tribal subsistence, cultural uses, spiritual values, and uses that are preserved by treaties. Tribal natural resource trustees are appointed by tribal governments. Some states have their own versions of a state Superfund law and may perform NRDA either through state laws or through other federal authorities such as the Oil Pollution Act.

CERCLA created the Agency for Toxic Substances and Disease Registry (ATSDR) to prevent human exposure to Superfund site contaminants and manage public health response when it occurs.

The primary goal of a Superfund cleanup is to reduce the risks to human health through a combination of cleanup, engineered controls like caps, and site restrictions such as groundwater use restrictions. A secondary goal is to return the site to productive use as a business, recreation, or as a natural ecosystem. Identifying the intended reuse early in the cleanup often results in faster and less expensive cleanups. EPA's Superfund Redevelopment Program provides tools and support for site redevelopment.

== History ==
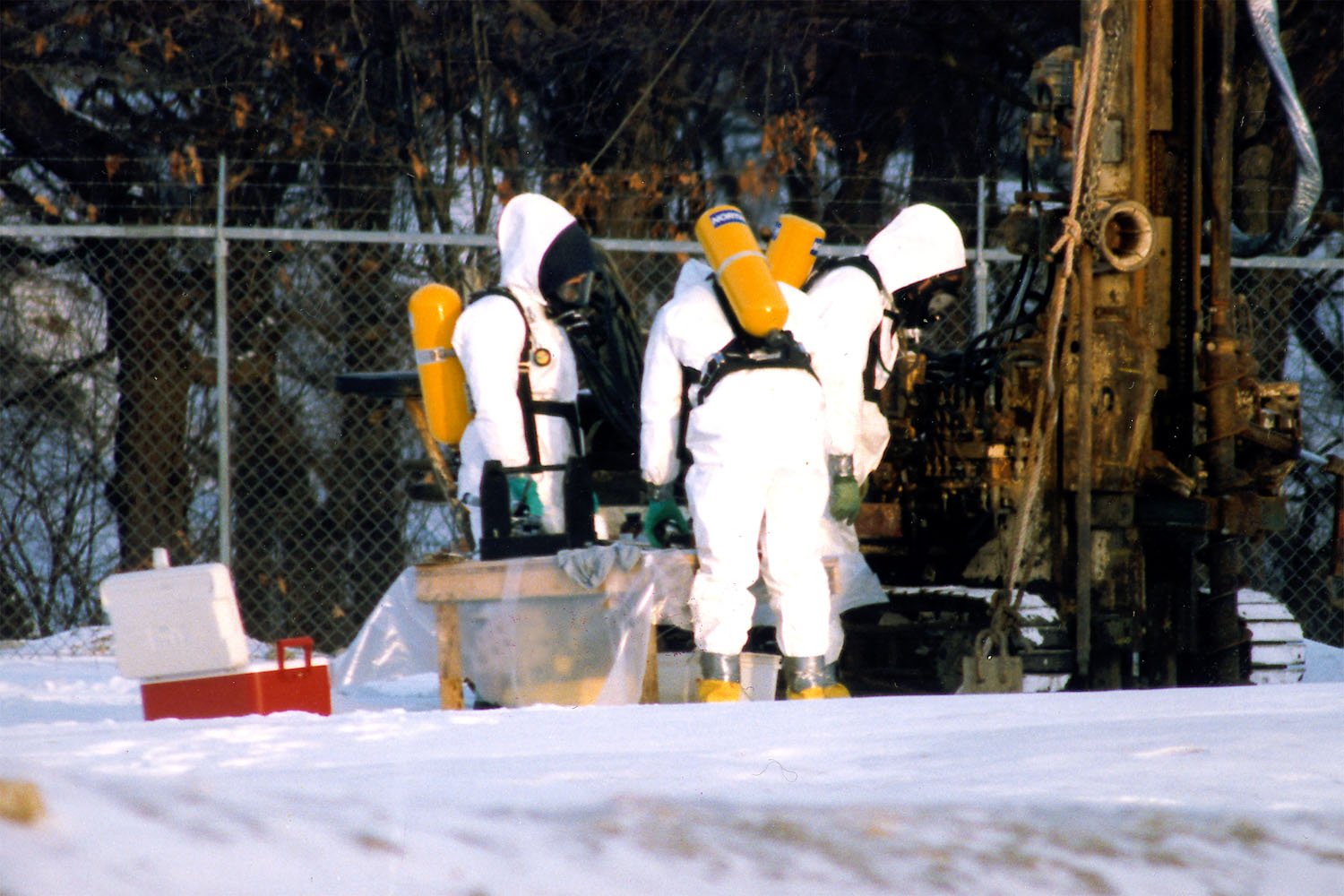
Workers in hazmat suits check the status of a cleanup site

CERCLA was enacted by Congress in 1980 in response to the threat of hazardous waste sites, typified by the Love Canal disaster in New York, and the Valley of the Drums in Kentucky. It was recognized that funding would be difficult, since the responsible parties were not easily found, and so the Superfund was established to provide funding through a taxing mechanism on certain industries and to create a comprehensive liability framework to be able to hold a broader range of parties responsible. The initial Superfund trust fund to clean up sites where a polluter could not be identified, could not or would not pay (bankruptcy or refusal), consisted of about $1.6 billion and then increased to $8.5 billion. Initially, the framework for implementing the program came from the oil and hazardous substances National Contingency Plan.

The EPA published the first Hazard Ranking System in 1981, and the first National Priorities List in 1983. Implementation of the program in early years, during the Ronald Reagan administration, was ineffective, with only 16 of the 799 Superfund sites cleaned up and only $40 million of $700 million in recoverable funds from responsible parties collected. The mismanagement of the program under Anne Gorsuch Burford, Reagan's first chosen Administrator of the agency, led to a congressional investigation and the reauthorization of the program in 1986 through an act amending CERCLA.

=== 1986 amendments ===
The Superfund Amendments and Reauthorization Act of 1986 (SARA) added minimum cleanup requirements in Section 121 and required that most cleanup agreements with polluters be entered in federal court as a consent decree subject to public comment (section 122). This was to address sweetheart deals between industry and the Reagan-era EPA that Congress had discovered.

=== Environmental justice initiative ===
In 1994 President Bill Clinton issued Executive Order 12898, which called for federal agencies to make achieving environmental justice a requirement by addressing low income populations and minority populations that have experienced disproportionate adverse health and environmental effects as a result of their programs, policies, and activities. The EPA regional offices had to apply required guidelines for its Superfund managers to take into consideration data analysis, managed public participation, and economic opportunity when considering the geography of toxic waste site remediation. Some environmentalists and industry lobbyists saw the Clinton administration's environmental justice policy as an improvement, but the order did not receive bipartisan support. The newly elected Republican Congress made numerous unsuccessful efforts to significantly weaken the program. The Clinton administration then adopted some industry favored reforms as policy and blocked most major changes.

=== Decline of excise tax ===
Until the mid-1990s, most of the funding came from an excise tax on the petroleum and chemical industries, reflecting the polluter pays principle. Even though by 1995 the Superfund balance had decreased to about $4 billion, Congress chose not to reauthorize collection of the tax, and by 2003 the fund was empty. Since 2001, most of the funding for cleanups of hazardous waste sites has come from taxpayers. State governments pay 10 percent of cleanup costs in general, and at least 50 percent of cleanup costs if the state operated the facility responsible for contamination. By 2013 federal funding for the program had decreased from $2 billion in 1999 to less than $1.1 billion (in constant dollars).

In 2001, the EPA used funds from the Superfund program to institute the cleanup of anthrax on Capitol Hill after the 2001 anthrax attacks. It was the first time the agency dealt with a biological release rather than a chemical or oil spill.

From 2000 to 2015, Congress allocated about $1.26 billion of general revenue to the Superfund program each year. Consequently, less than half the number of sites were cleaned up from 2001 to 2008, compared to before. The decrease continued during the Obama administration, and since under the direction of EPA Administrator Gina McCarthy Superfund cleanups decreased even more from 20 in 2009 to a mere 8 in 2014.

=== Reauthorization of excise tax ===
In November 2021, Congress reauthorized an excise tax on chemical manufacturers, under the Infrastructure Investment and Jobs Act. The new chemical excise tax is effective July 1, 2022, and is double the rate of the previous Superfund tax. The 2021 law also authorized $3.5 billion in emergency appropriations from the U.S. government general fund for hazardous site cleanups in the immediate future.

== Provisions ==
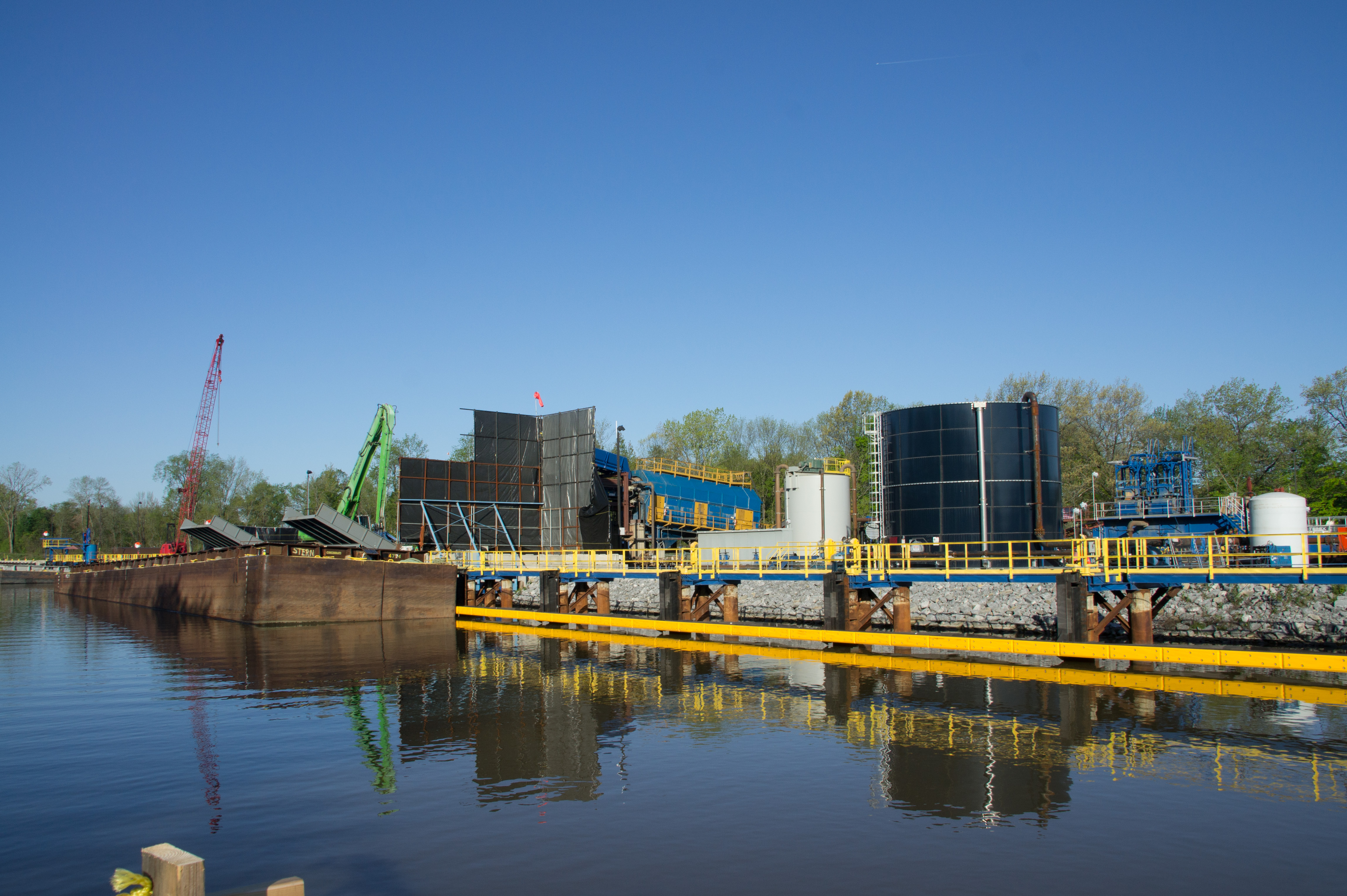
PCB dredging operations on the Hudson River

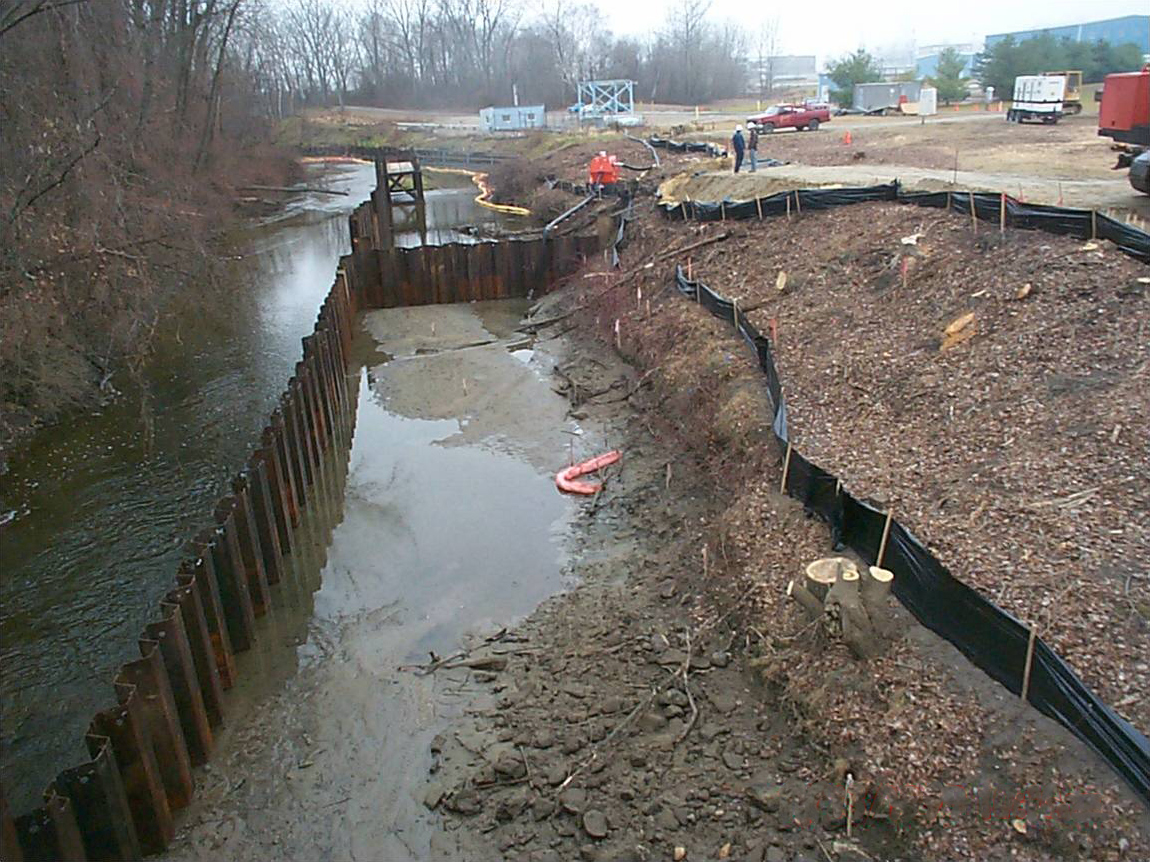
Cleanup of the Housatonic River in Pittsfield, Massachusetts

CERCLA authorizes two kinds of response actions:

1. Removal actions. These are typically short-term response actions, where actions may be taken to address releases or threatened releases requiring prompt response. Removal actions are classified as: (1) emergency; (2) time-critical; and (3) non-time critical. Removal responses are generally used to address localized risks such as abandoned drums containing hazardous substances, and contaminated surface soils posing acute risks to human health or the environment.
2. Remedial actions. These are usually long-term response actions. Remedial actions seek to permanently and significantly reduce the risks associated with releases or threats of releases of hazardous substances, and are generally larger, more expensive actions. They can include measures such as using containment to prevent pollutants from migrating, and combinations of removing, treating, or neutralizing toxic substances. These actions can be conducted with federal funding only at sites listed on the EPA National Priorities List (NPL) in the United States and the territories. Remedial action by responsible parties under consent decrees or unilateral administrative orders with EPA oversight may be performed at both NPL and non-NPL sites, commonly called Superfund Alternative Sites in published EPA guidance and policy documents.

A potentially responsible party (PRP) is a possible polluter who may eventually be held liable under CERCLA for the contamination or misuse of a particular property or resource. Four classes of PRPs may be liable for contamination at a Superfund site:

1. the current owner or operator of the site;
2. the owner or operator of a site at the time that disposal of a hazardous substance, pollutant or contaminant occurred;
3. a person who arranged for the disposal of a hazardous substance, pollutant or contaminant at a site; and
4. a person who transported a hazardous substance, pollutant or contaminant to a site, who also has selected that site for the disposal of the hazardous substances, pollutants or contaminants.

The liability scheme of CERCLA changed commercial and industrial real estate, making sellers liable for contamination from past activities, meaning they can't pass liability onto unknowing buyers without any responsibility. Buyers also have to be aware of future liabilities, including for ongoing, latent contamination on the purchased property as well as contamination of adjacent properties.

The CERCLA also required the revision of the National Oil and Hazardous Substances Pollution Contingency Plan 9605(a)(NCP). The NCP guides how to respond to releases and threatened releases of hazardous substances, pollutants, or contaminants. The NCP established the National Priorities List, which appears as Appendix B to the NCP, and serves as EPA's information and management tool. The NPL is updated periodically by federal rulemaking.

The identification of a site for the NPL is intended primarily to guide the EPA in:

- Determining which sites warrant further investigation to assess the nature and extent of risks to human health and the environment
- Identifying what CERCLA-financed remedial actions may be appropriate
- Notifying the public of sites, the EPA believes warrant further investigation
- Notifying PRPs that the EPA may initiate CERCLA-financed remedial action.

Despite the name, the Superfund trust fund has lacked sufficient funds to clean up even a small number of the sites on the NPL. As a result, the EPA typically negotiates consent orders with PRPs to study sites and develop cleanup alternatives, subject to EPA oversight and approval of all such activities. The EPA then issues a Proposed Plans for remedial action for a site on which it takes public comment, after which it makes a cleanup decision in a Record of Decision (ROD). RODs are typically implemented under consent decrees by PRPs or under unilateral orders if consent cannot be reached. If a party fails to comply with such an order, it may be fined up to $37,500 for each day that non-compliance continues. A party that spends money to clean up a site may sue other PRPs in a contribution action under the CERCLA. CERCLA liability has generally been judicially established as joint and several among PRPs to the government for cleanup costs (i.e., each PRP is hypothetically responsible for all costs subject to contribution), but CERCLA liability is allocable among PRPs in contribution based on comparative fault. An "orphan share" is the share of costs at a Superfund site that is attributable to a PRP that is either unidentifiable or insolvent. The EPA tries to treat all PRPs equitably and fairly. Budgetary cuts and constraints can make more equitable treatment of PRPs more difficult.

== Procedures ==
A national map of Superfund sites. Red indicates currently on final National Priority List, yellow is proposed, green is deleted (usually meaning having been cleaned up). This map is as of October 2013.

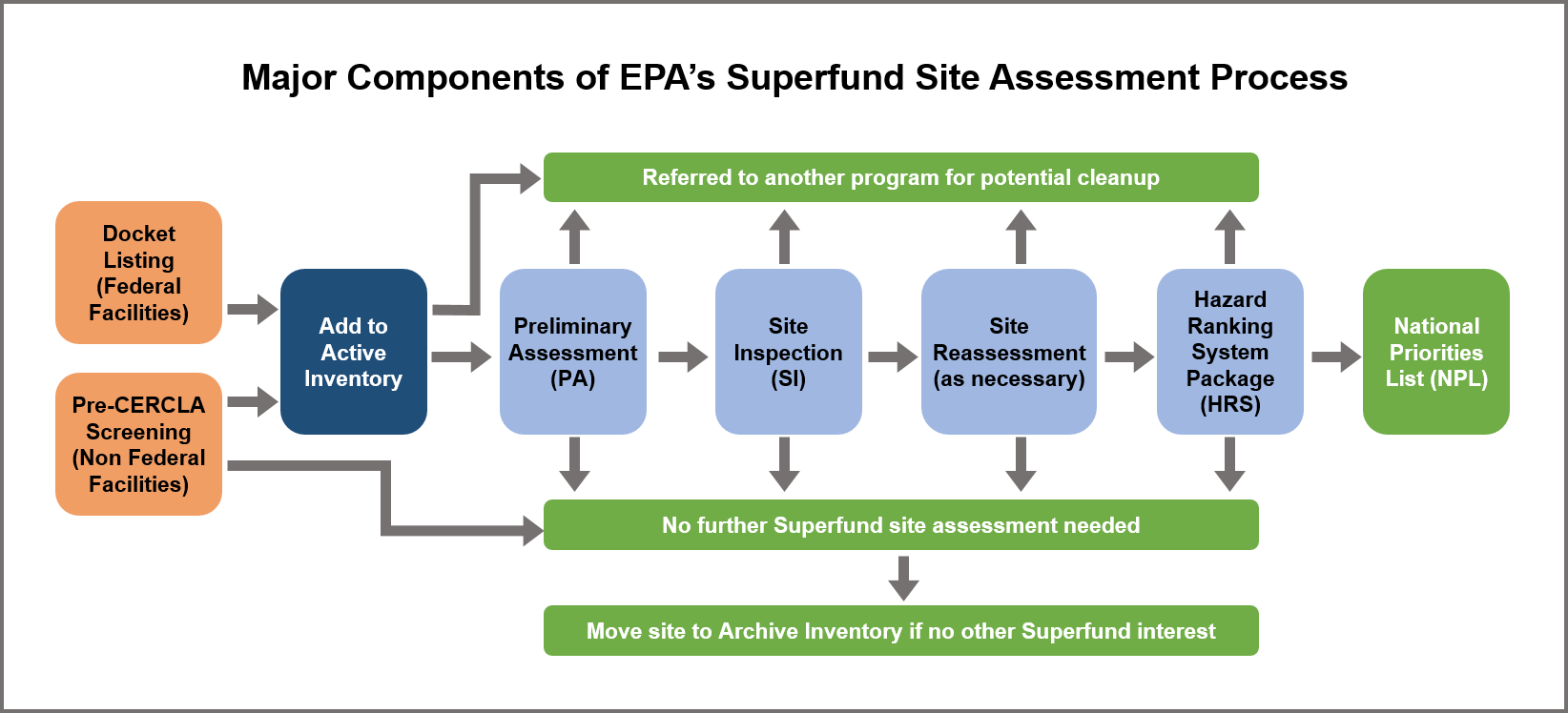
Superfund site assessment process

Upon notification of a potentially hazardous waste site, the EPA conducts a Preliminary Assessment/Site Inspection (PA/SI), which involves records reviews, interviews, visual inspections, and limited field sampling. Information from the PA/SI is used by the EPA to develop a Hazard Ranking System (HRS) score to determine the CERCLA status of the site. Sites that score high enough to be listed typically proceed to a Remedial Investigation/Feasibility Study (RI/FS).

The RI includes an extensive sampling program and risk assessment that defines the nature and extent of the site contamination and risks. The FS is used to develop and evaluate various remediation alternatives. The preferred alternative is presented in a Proposed Plan for public review and comment, followed by a selected alternative in a ROD. The site then enters into a Remedial Design phase and then the Remedial Action phase. Many sites include long-term monitoring. Once the Remedial Action has been completed, reviews are required every five years, whenever hazardous substances are left onsite above levels safe for unrestricted use.

- The CERCLA information system (CERCLIS) is a database maintained by the EPA and the states that lists sites where releases may have occurred, must be addressed, or have been addressed. CERCLIS consists of three inventories: the CERCLIS Removal Inventory, the CERCLIS Remedial Inventory, and the CERCLIS Enforcement Inventory.
- The Superfund Innovative Technology Evaluation (SITE) program supports development of technologies for assessing and treating waste at Superfund sites. The EPA evaluates the technology and provides an assessment of its potential for future use in Superfund remediation actions. The SITE program consists of four related components: the Demonstration Program, the Emerging Technologies Program, the Monitoring and Measurement Technologies Program, and Technology Transfer activities.
- A reportable quantity (RQ) is the minimum quantity of a hazardous substance which, if released, must be reported.
- A source control action represents the construction or installation and start-up of those actions necessary to prevent the continued release of hazardous substances (primarily from a source on top of or within the ground, or in buildings or other structures) into the environment.
- A section 104(e) letter is a request by the government for information about a site. It may include general notice to a potentially responsible party that CERCLA-related action may be undertaken at a site for which the recipient may be responsible. This section also authorizes the EPA to enter facilities and obtain information relating to PRPs, hazardous substances releases, and liability, and to order access for CERCLA activities. The 104(e) letter information-gathering resembles written interrogatories in civil litigation.
- A section 106 order is a unilateral administrative order issued by EPA to PRP(s) to perform remedial actions at a Superfund site when the EPA determines there may be an imminent and substantial endangerment to the public health or welfare or the environment because of an actual or threatened release of a hazardous substance from a facility, subject to treble damages and daily fines if the order is not obeyed.
- A remedial response is a long-term action that stops or substantially reduces a release of a hazardous substance that could affect public health or the environment. The term remediation, or cleanup, is sometimes used interchangeably with the terms remedial action, removal action, response action, remedy, or corrective action.
  - A nonbinding allocation of responsibility (NBAR) is a device, established in the Superfund Amendments and Reauthorization Act, that allows the EPA to make a nonbinding estimate of the proportional share that each of the various responsible parties at a Superfund site should pay toward the costs of cleanup.
- Relevant and appropriate requirements are those United States federal or state cleanup requirements that, while not "applicable," address problems sufficiently similar to those encountered at the CERCLA site that their use is appropriate. Requirements may be relevant and appropriate if they would be "applicable" except for jurisdictional restrictions associated with the requirement.

== Implementation ==
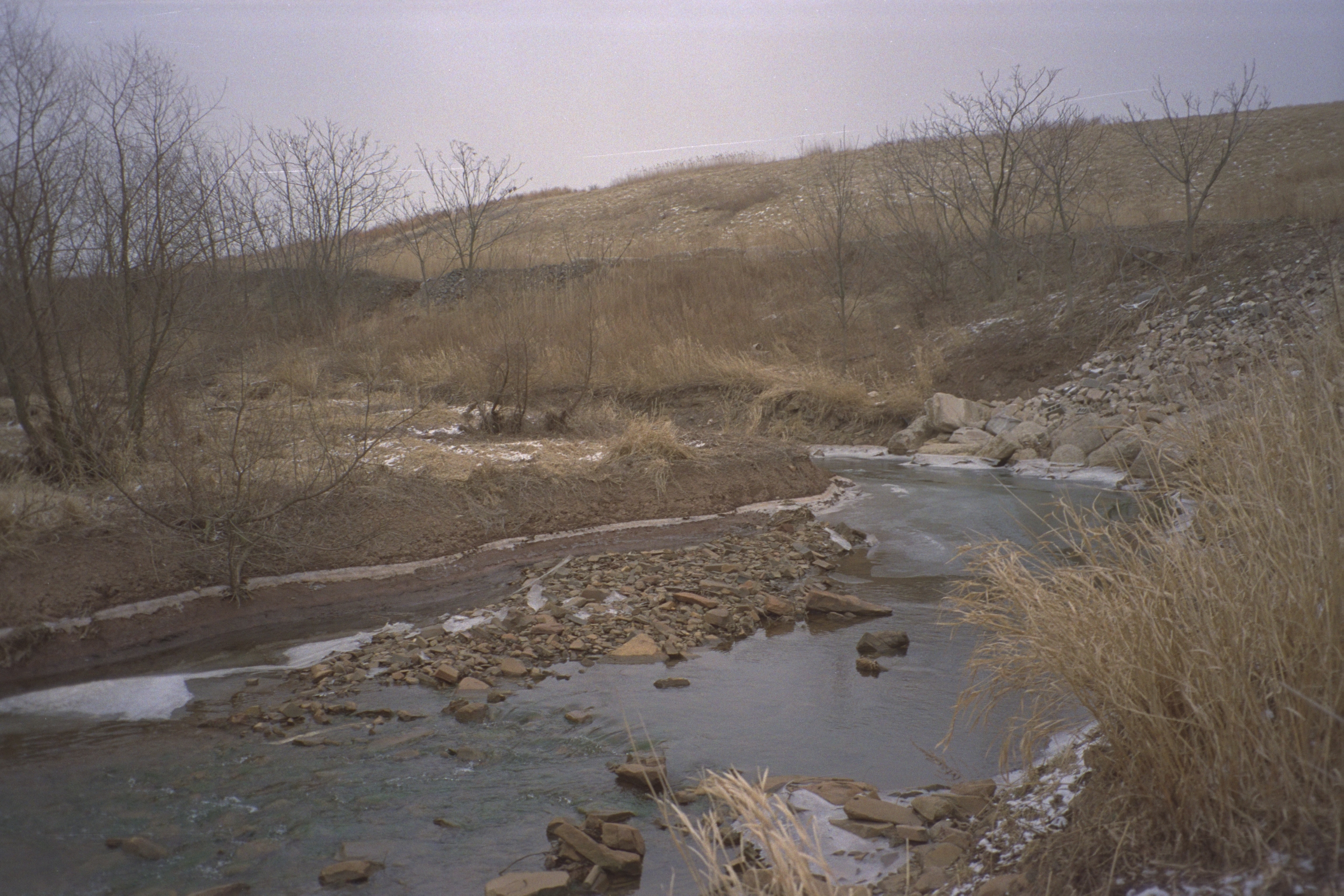
Polluted Martin's Creek on the Kin-Buc Landfill Superfund site in Edison, New Jersey

As of July 3, 2025, there were 1,343 sites listed; an additional 459 had been deleted, and 38 new sites have been proposed on the NPL.

Historically about 70 percent of Superfund cleanup activities have been paid for by potentially responsible party (PRPs). When the party either cannot be found or is unable to pay for the cleanup, the Superfund law originally paid for site cleanups through an excise tax on petroleum and chemical manufacturers.

The last full fiscal year (FY) in which the Department of the Treasury collected the excise tax was 1995. At the end of FY 1996, the invested trust fund balance was $6.0 billion. This fund was exhausted by the end of FY 2003. Since that time Superfund sites for which the PRPs could not pay have been paid for from the general fund. Under the 2021 authorization by Congress, collection of excise taxes from chemical manufacturers will resume in 2022.

=== Hazard Ranking System ===
The Hazard Ranking System is a scoring system used to evaluate potential relative risks to public health and the environment from releases or threatened releases of hazardous wastes at uncontrolled waste sites. Under the Superfund program, the EPA and state agencies use the HRS to calculate a site score (ranging from 0 to 100) based on the actual or potential release of hazardous substances from a site through air, surface water or groundwater. A score of 28.5 places the site on the National Priorities List, making the site eligible for long-term remedial action (i.e., cleanup) under the Superfund program..

== Risks associated with contaminated sites ==
=== Groundwater contamination ===
Groundwater is water that exists underground within saturated zones beneath the land surface. It fills the pores, fractures, and crevices in underground geological materials such as sand, gravel, and rock. Groundwater is a vital natural resource, accounting for available freshwater resources as it serves as the primary drinking water source. Contaminants once released into the ground typically move downwards through the soil profile. The soil acts as a filter for larger particles, but many dissolved chemicals, fine particles, and various human-made substances can pass into the aquifer and lower into the ground.

The contamination of groundwater at Superfund sites is a result of the release of hazardous substances from various industrial activities and waste disposal practices. The characterization of superfund sites means that it complex mixtures of contaminants rather than a single pollutant. These substances can transport from the original source through the soil and into underlying aquifers which could create a persistent environmental and cause potential health risks. Superfund sites typically originate from past industrial operations where hazardous substances were manufactured, used, or disposed of, with practices that would be considered inadequate or illegal by modern environmental standards. Many of these sites reflect a history of unregulated industrial practices, where waste disposal methods common at the time led to direct and often extensive contamination of soil and groundwater. This historical context means the contamination is widespread that involves mixtures of pollutants, and is deeply embedded in the ground, making cleanup inherently more complex and costly. The varied industrial histories of Superfund sites have resulted in a wide variety of contaminants polluting the groundwater. These contaminants being persistent means they do not break down in the environment that easily. Such mixtures can lead to toxic effects in humans and ecosystems and make remediation considerably more challenging, as technologies effective for one contaminant may be ineffective or even counterproductive for another. There are more than 600 chemicals that have been discovered at Superfund sites; some of the most common contaminants include lead (43% of sites), trichloroethylene (42%), chromium (35%), benzene (34%), perchloroethylene (28%), arsenic (28%), and toluene (27%) (ATSDR, 1989).

Key industrial activities and sources contributing to groundwater contamination at Superfund sites include:

- Manufacturing and chemical production: Facilities involved in the manufacturing of chemicals, pesticides, pharmaceuticals, plastics, and other goods have often been sources of contamination through improper disposal of process wastes, accidental spills, or leakage of solvents, pesticides, and various industrial chemicals. These contaminants often include persistent organic pollutants.
- Mining and metal processing: Mining operations and metal processing facilities can release heavy metals such as lead, arsenic, and mercury into the environment. Acid mine drainage, a highly acidic and metal-laden discharge from certain types of mines, is a particularly severe form of water pollution. Many legacy mining operations, which ceased activity before the advent of modern environmental regulations, have left behind extensive soil and water contamination.
- Petroleum refining and storage: Leaks and spills of crude oil, gasoline, diesel fuel, and other petroleum products can contaminate soil and groundwater with hazardous substances such as benzene. Underground storage tanks (USTs) used for storing petroleum products at gas stations and industrial facilities are a common source of leaks.
- Waste management and landfills: Landfills, particularly older ones constructed before stringent design and operational regulations were implemented, are major sources of groundwater contamination. Hazardous wastes disposed of in these landfills can leach out as rainwater percolates through the waste, forming a contaminated liquid called leachate. If the landfill lacks proper liners and leachate collection systems, this leachate can migrate into the underlying soil and groundwater.
- Military and defense-related activities: Numerous military bases and defense-related facilities have become Superfund sites due to contamination from activities such as weapons testing and maintenance, aircraft and vehicle servicing, and waste disposal. Common contaminants include explosives, solvents (such as TCE used for degreasing), fuels, and in some cases, radioactive materials.
- Agricultural practices: While less commonly the primary driver for a Superfund designation compared to industrial sites, agricultural activities can contribute to groundwater contamination through the widespread use of pesticides and fertilizers. Runoff from agricultural fields can carry these chemicals into surface waters and also allow them to seep into groundwater.

==== Human health impacts: exposure pathways and associated risks ====
The contamination of groundwater resources by hazardous substances released from Superfund sites has consequences, impacting human health. Humans can be exposed to contaminants present in groundwater through multiple pathways, not solely through the direct consumption of drinking water. This multiplicity of exposure routes means that simply providing an alternative drinking water source may not eliminate all health risks if other pathways are not adequately assessed and managed. The specific health risks associated with exposure to contaminated groundwater depend on several factors, including the types and concentrations of contaminants present. Toxicity is the most common concern in regard to groundwater contaminants. Toxicity is either classified as acute or chronic. Acute toxicity results from short-term exposure to relatively high contaminant dosages and Chronic toxicity occurs as the result of drinking low contaminant concentrations over a long period of time. Chronic toxicity is the most common toxicity in groundwater contamination that comes from the improper disposal of hazardous chemicals.

Common health effects linked to contaminants frequently found at Superfund sites include:

- Microorganisms: Can cause gastrointestinal illnesses and infections.
- Nitrates and nitrites: High levels can lead to methemoglobinemia ("blue baby syndrome") in infants, a serious condition that impairs the blood's ability to carry oxygen.
- Heavy metals (e.g., lead, arsenic, cadmium, mercury): Can cause a wide range of health problems, including acute and chronic toxicity, damage to the liver, kidneys, and intestines, anemia, neurological damage, developmental problems, and various types of cancer.
- Organic chemicals (e.g., VOCs, pesticides): Associated with damage to the kidneys, liver, circulatory system, nervous system, and reproductive system. Many are known or suspected carcinogens.

==== Environmental and ecological impacts ====
Groundwater contamination from Superfund sites does not remain isolated beneath the ground. As groundwater moves, it can discharge into surface water bodies such as rivers, lakes, streams, and wetlands. The contamination is removed from the original source of contamination at the Superfund site and onward to other areas. Contaminated groundwater can have a factor on many environmental and ecological areas.

The introduction of hazardous substances effects:

- Direct toxicity to aquatic life: Many contaminants are directly toxic to fish, amphibians, and aquatic plants. Exposure can lead to mortality, reduced growth and reproductive success, physiological stress, or chronic health problems.
- Bioaccumulation and biomagnification: Persistent contaminants, such as heavy metals and certain organic pollutants can be accumulated in their tissues over time. As these organisms are consumed by predators, the concentration of these toxins can increase at successively higher levels of the food chain, potentially reaching levels that are harmful to wildlife and humans who consume these contaminated fish.
- Habitat degradation: The influx of contaminants can alter the chemical composition of surface water such as change of pH and sediments, making habitats unsuitable for many native aquatic species. This can lead to a decline in species richness and abundance.
- Loss of biodiversity: The overall biodiversity of the aquatic ecosystem can be reduced. This can disrupt the ecological balance and impair the ecosystem's ability to perform essential functions, such as nutrient cycling and water purification.
- Eutrophication and oxygen depletion: Over-enrichment of nutrients that fuels excessive growth of algae and aquatic plants (algal blooms). When these blooms die and decompose, bacteria consume large amounts of dissolved oxygen in the water, leading to dead zones which can suffocate fish and other oxygen-dependent aquatic life.
- Soil contamination: The accumulation of heavy metals, persistent organic pollutants, or other toxins in the soil can reduce soil fertility and harm soil microorganisms essential for nutrient cycling.
- Impacts on vegetation: Plants can take up contaminants from the soil or water, leading to reduced growth, visible injury, or death. Contaminants can also accumulate in plant tissues, potentially entering the terrestrial food webs.

== Environmental discrimination ==
Federal actions to address the disproportionate health and environmental disparities that minority and low-income populations face through Executive Order 12898 required federal agencies to make environmental justice central to their programs and policies. Superfund sites have been shown to impact minority communities the most. Despite legislation specifically designed to ensure equity in Superfund listing, marginalized populations still experience a lesser chance of successful listing and cleanup than areas with higher income levels. After the executive order had been put in place, there persisted a discrepancy between the demographics of the communities living near toxic waste sites and their listing as Superfund sites, which would otherwise grant them federally funded cleanup projects. Communities with both increased minority and low-income populations were found to have lowered their chances of site listing after the executive order, while on the other hand, increases in income led to greater chances of site listing. Of the populations living within 1 mile radius of a Superfund site, 44% of those are minorities despite only being around 37% of the nation's population.

As of January 2021, more than 9,000 federally subsidized properties, including ones with hundreds of dwellings, were less than a mile from a Superfund site.

=== Case studies in African American communities ===
In 1978, residents of the rural black community of Triana, Alabama were found to be contaminated with DDT and PCB, some of whom had the highest levels of DDT ever recorded in human history. The DDT was found in high levels in Indian Creek, which many residents relied on for sustenance fishing. Although this major health threat to residents of Triana was discovered in 1978, the federal government did not act until 5 years later after the mayor of Triana filed a class-action lawsuit in 1980.

In West Dallas, Texas, a mostly African American and Latino community, a lead smelter poisoned the surrounding neighborhood, elementary school, and day cares for more than five decades. Dallas city officials were informed in 1972 that children in the proximity of the smelter were being exposed to lead contamination. The city sued the lead smelters in 1974, then reduced its lead regulations in 1976. It wasn't until 1981 that the EPA commissioned a study on the lead contamination in this neighborhood and found the same results that had been found a decade earlier. In 1983, the surrounding day cares had to close due to the lead exposure while the lead smelter remained operating. It was later revealed that EPA Deputy Administrator John Hernandez had deliberately stalled the cleanup of the lead-contaminated hot spots. It wasn't until 1993 that the site was declared a Superfund site, and at the time it was one of the largest ones. However, it was not until 2004 when the EPA completed the clean-up efforts and eliminated the lead pollutant sources from the site.

The Afton community of Warren County, North Carolina is one of the most prominent environmental injustice cases and is often pointed to as the roots of the environmental justice movement. PCBs were illegally dumped into the community and then it eventually became a PCB landfill. Community leaders pressed the state for the site to be cleaned up for an entire decade until it was finally detoxified. However, this decontamination did not return the site to its pre-1982 conditions. There has been a call for reparations to the community which has not yet been met.

Bayview-Hunters Point, San Francisco, a historically African American community, has faced persistent environmental discrimination due to the poor remediation efforts of the San Francisco Naval Shipyard, a federally declared Superfund site. The negligence of multiple agencies to adequately clean this site has led Bayview residents to be subject to high rates of pollution and has been tied to high rates of cancer, asthma, and overall higher health hazards than other regions of San Francisco.

=== Case studies in Native American communities ===
One example is the Church Rock uranium mill spill on the Navajo Nation. It was the largest radioactive spill in the US but received a long delay in government response and cleanup after being placed as a lower priority site. Two sets of five-year cleanup plans have been put in place by US Congress, but contamination from the Church Rock incident has still not been completely cleaned up. Today, uranium contamination from mining during the Cold War era remains throughout the Navajo Nation, posing health risks to the Navajo community.

== Accessing data ==
The data in the Superfund Program are available to the public.

- Superfund Site Search
- Superfund Policy, Reports and Other Documents
- TOXMAP was a Geographic Information System (GIS) from the Division of Specialized Information Services of the United States National Library of Medicine (NLM) that was deprecated on December 16, 2019. The application used maps of the United States to help users visually explore data from the EPA Toxics Release Inventory (TRI) and Superfund programs. TOXMAP was a resource funded by the US Federal Government. TOXMAP's chemical and environmental health information is taken from NLM's Toxicology Data Network (TOXNET), PubMed, and other authoritative sources.

== Future challenges ==
While the simple and relatively easy sites have been cleaned up, EPA is now addressing a residual number of difficult and massive sites such as large-area mining and sediment sites, which is tying up a significant amount of funding. Also, while the federal government has reserved funding for cleanup of federal facility sites, this clean-up is going much more slowly. The delay is due to a number of reasons, including EPA's limited ability to require performance, difficulty of dealing with Department of Energy radioactive wastes, and the sheer number of federal facility sites.

== See also ==
- Brownfield land
- Formerly Used Defense Sites - Environmental restoration program
- Hazardous Materials Transportation Act
- National Oil and Hazardous Substances Contingency Plan
- Phase I Environmental Site Assessment
- Toxics Release Inventory
