= United States v. Atlantic Research Corp. =

- Supreme Court of the United States

Decided June 11, 2007
- Full case name: United States v. Atlantic Research Corp.
- Citations: 551 U.S. 128 (more)

Holding
- Because CERCLA's Section 107(a)(4)(B) allows a potentially responsible party (PRP) to recover costs from other PRPs, the statute provides a private cause of action to achieve that result with a lawsuit.

Court membership
- Chief Justice John Roberts Associate Justices John P. Stevens · Antonin Scalia; Anthony Kennedy · David Souter; Clarence Thomas · Ruth Bader Ginsburg; Stephen Breyer · Samuel Alito

Laws applied
- Comprehensive Environmental Response, Compensation, and Liability Act of 1980

United States v. Atlantic Research Corp., 551 U.S. 128 (2007), was a United States Supreme Court case in which the court held that, because the CERCLA's Section 107(a)(4)(B) allows a potentially responsible party (PRP) to recover costs from other PRPs, the statute provides a private cause of action to achieve that result with a lawsuit.

== Background ==
Sections 107(a) and 113(f) of the Comprehensive Environmental Response, Compensation, and Liability Act of 1980 allow private parties to recover expenses associated with cleaning up contaminated sites. Section 107(a) defines four categories of potentially responsible parties (PRPs), and Section 107(a)(4) establishes what they are liable for. The first two liabilities were relevant: "(A) all costs of removal or remedial action incurred by the United States Government or a State or an Indian tribe not inconsistent with the national contingency plan", and "(B) any other necessary costs of response incurred by any other person consistent with [such] plan".

Originally, some courts interpreted §107(a)(4)(B) as providing a cause of action for a private party to recover voluntarily incurred response costs and to seek contribution after having been sued. However, after the enactment of §113(f), which authorizes one PRP to sue another for contribution, many courts held it to be the exclusive remedy for PRPs. In Cooper Industries, Inc. v. Aviall Services, Inc., 543 U. S. 157, the Supreme Court held that a private party could seek contribution under §113(f) only after being sued under §106 or §107(a).

After Atlantic Research cleaned up a government site that it leased and contaminated while doing government work, it sued the government to recover some of its costs under §107(a). The federal District Court dismissed the case, but the Eighth Circuit Court of Appeals reversed, holding that §113(f) does not provide the exclusive remedy for recovering cleanup costs. The Eighth Circuit said that §107(a)(4)(B) provided a cause of action to any person other than those permitted to sue under §107(a)(4)(A).

== Opinion of the court ==
The Supreme Court issued an opinion on June 11, 2007, affirming the decision of the Eighth Circuit. Justice Thomas wrote the opinion for a unanimous Court. Accepting the argument of Atlantic Research, the Court held that "the Government’s interpretation would reduce the number of potential plaintiffs to almost zero, rendering §107(a)(4)(B) a dead letter."
