= List of United States Supreme Court cases, volume 543 =

This is a list of all the United States Supreme Court cases from volume 543 of the United States Reports:

| Case name | Citation | Date decided |
|---|---|---|
| Leocal v. Ashcroft | 543 U.S. 1 | 2004 |
DUI crimes that have either no mens rea element or require merely negligence for a conviction are not "crimes of violence" that subject aliens to deportation.
| Norfolk S. Ry. Co. v. James N. Kirby, Pty Ltd. | 543 U.S. 14 | 2004 |
Federal law controls the interpretation of bills of lading when they are maritime contracts and the dispute is not inherently local.
| Smith v. Texas | 543 U.S. 37 | 2004 |
| Koons Buick Pontiac GMC, Inc. v. Nigh | 543 U.S. 50 | 2004 |
| City of San Diego v. Roe | 543 U.S. 77 | 2004 |
| Kansas v. Colorado | 543 U.S. 86 | 2004 |
| KP Permanent Make-Up, Inc. v. Lasting Impression I, Inc. | 543 U.S. 111 | 2004 |
A fair use defense to a trademark infringement action does not require proof that there is no likelihood of confusing the marks.
| Kowalski v. Tesmer | 543 U.S. 125 | 2004 |
Attorneys lack third-party standing to assert the rights of indigent defendants denied their constitutional right to have appointed appellate counsel.
| Devenpeck v. Alford | 543 U.S. 146 | 2004 |
A warrantless arrest is reasonable under the Fourth Amendment if, given the facts known to the officer, there is probable cause to believe that a crime has been committed, even if the officer identifies a different crime at the time of arrest.
| Cooper Industries, Inc. v. Aviall Serv., Inc. | 543 U.S. 157 | 2004 |
A private party can seek contribution under CERCLA's §113(f) only after being sued under §106 or §107(a).
| Florida v. Nixon | 543 U.S. 175 | 2004 |
Defense counsel's failure to obtain the defendant's express consent to a strategy of conceding guilt in a capital trial does not automatically render counsel's performance deficient.
| Brosseau v. Haugen | 543 U.S. 194 | 2004 |
| Whitfield v. United States | 543 U.S. 209 | 2005 |
| United States v. Booker | 543 U.S. 220 | 2005 |
| Jama v. Immigration & Customs Enforcement | 543 U.S. 335 | 2005 |
| Clark v. Martinez | 543 U.S. 371 | 2005 |
| Illinois v. Caballes | 543 U.S. 405 | 2005 |
| Comm'r v. Banks | 543 U.S. 426 | 2005 |
| Howell v. Mississippi | 543 U.S. 440 | 2005 |
| Bell v. Cone | 543 U.S. 447 | 2005 |
| Smith v. Massachusetts | 543 U.S. 462 | 2005 |
Submitting a count to the jury after the judge has granted a mid-trial acquittal subjects a defendant to further factfinding proceedings going to guilt or innocence and violates the Double Jeopardy Clause.
| Stewart v. Dutra Constr. Co. | 543 U.S. 481 | 2005 |
A dredge is a "vessel" under the Longshore and Harbor Workers' Compensation Act.
| Johnson v. California | 543 U.S. 499 | 2005 |
A prison system's policy of segregating new residents by race for the purpose of inhibiting gang violence is subject to strict scrutiny analysis.
| Roper v. Simmons | 543 U.S. 551 | 2005 |
The Eighth and Fourteenth Amendments forbid imposition of the death penalty on offenders who were under the age of 18 when their crimes were committed.
| Cherokee Nation v. Leavitt | 543 U.S. 631 | 2005 |
The federal government's contract to reimburse a tribe for health care costs is binding even when Congress fails to appropriate funds for the cost.
