= Norfolk Southern Railway Co. v. James N. Kirby, Pty Ltd. =

Norfolk Southern Ry. v. James N. Kirby, Pty Ltd.
- Supreme Court of the United States

Argued October 6, 2004 Decided November 9, 2004
- Full case name: Norfolk Southern Railway Company v. James N. Kirby, Pty Ltd., dba Kirby Engineering, and Allianz Australia Insurance Limited
- Docket no.: 02-1028
- Citations: 543 U.S. 14 (more): 125 S. Ct. 385; 160 L. Ed. 2d 283
- Argument: Oral argument
- Opinion announcement: Opinion announcement

Case history
- Prior: Partial summary judgment for plaintiff (unpublished), (N.Ga. 2001); reversed, 300 F.3d 1300 (11th Cir. 2002); cert. granted, 540 U.S. 1099 (2004).

Holding
- Federal law controls the interpretation of bills of lading when they are maritime contracts and the dispute is not inherently local.

Court membership
- Chief Justice William Rehnquist Associate Justices John P. Stevens · Sandra Day O'Connor; Antonin Scalia · Anthony Kennedy; David Souter · Clarence Thomas; Ruth Bader Ginsburg · Stephen Breyer

Case opinion
- Majority: O'Connor, joined by unanimous

Laws applied
- Carriage of Goods by Sea Act

Norfolk Southern Ry. v. James N. Kirby, Pty Ltd., 543 U.S. 14 (2004), was a United States Supreme Court case that dealt with the extent to which maritime bills of lading cover non-maritime portions of a shipment, together with connected clauses for exclusion of liability.

== Background ==
In August 1997, James N. Kirby, Pty Ltd., an Australian manufacturer, hired International Cargo Control Pty Ltd. (ICC) as a shipping intermediary to arrange a shipment of goods from Milperra, New South Wales to Athens, Alabama. The total shipment consisted of fifty containers, of which forty were routed through the port of Long Beach, California and the rail terminal in Memphis, Tennessee. The remaining ten oversized containers, because of logistical constraints, were routed through the port of Savannah, Georgia. For these ten containers, ICC Ltd. arranged for carriage by truck from Milperra to Sydney, by sea from Sydney to Savannah, by rail from Savannah to Huntsville, Alabama, and by truck from Huntsville to Athens. ICC subcontracted with motor carriers for the truck movements in Australia and Alabama and subcontracted with an ocean carrier for the sea and rail movements.

ICC issued Kirby a bill of lading, which invoked liability limitations provided by the Carriage of Goods by Sea Act (COGSA), as well as a Himalaya clause which extended ICC's limitations of liability to companies ICC hired. ICC hired Hamburg Süd to transport the goods, and Hamburg Süd issued ICC a bill of lading that also invoked COGSA protections and included a Himalaya clause.

The limitation specified in COGSA was:

Neither the carrier nor the ship shall in any event be or become liable for any loss or damage to or in connection with the transportation of goods in an amount exceeding $500 per package lawful money of the United States . . . unless the nature and value of such goods have been declared by the shipper before shipment and inserted into the bill of lading.

— 46 U. S. C. App. §1304(5)

Hamburg Süd carried the goods on a ship to Savannah, Georgia and subcontracted Norfolk Southern Railway to transport the goods inland to Alabama. In October 1997, the train derailed near Littleville, Alabama. Kirby sued Norfolk Southern in October 1998 to recover the $1.5 million in damages he claimed the derailment caused his goods.

== The courts below ==
The United States District Court for the Northern District of Georgia ruled Norfolk Southern could limit its liability to Kirby on the basis of the Himalaya clause in the Hamburg Süd contract. As the Himalaya clause in the Hamburg Süd bill incorporated COGSA, which specified that liability was limited to $500 per package, and the shipment was packed in ten containers, Norfolk Southern's total liability was therefore $5000. On the joint motion of the parties, the district court certified its order for interlocutory appeal.

The United States Court of Appeals for the Eleventh Circuit reversed and ruled the Hamburg Süd bill did not limit Norfolk Southern's liability to Kirby because Kirby was not bound by its terms. The 11th Circuit observed that previous jurisprudence supported the proposition that Himalaya clauses did not extend to inland carriers that had not been in privity with ICC when ICC issued the bill.:

This principle makes sense in light of the origins and purpose of Himalaya clauses. Himalaya clauses originally were aimed more at extending COGSA protections to additional parties who handle cargo in and around a port than at extending the reach of those protections inland. That is why most of our cases concerning Himalaya clauses have involved as the defendants stevedores, terminal operators, and other similar parties whose work is done at or close to the point where the cargo is unloaded from the ship. We should be cautious about extending the reach of a Himalaya clause, and with it the reach of COGSA, inland.

== The issues on appeal ==
1. Did federal law govern the interpretation of the ICC and Hamburg Süd bills of lading?
2. Was Norfolk entitled to the protection of the liability limitations in both bills?

== Decision of the Supreme Court ==
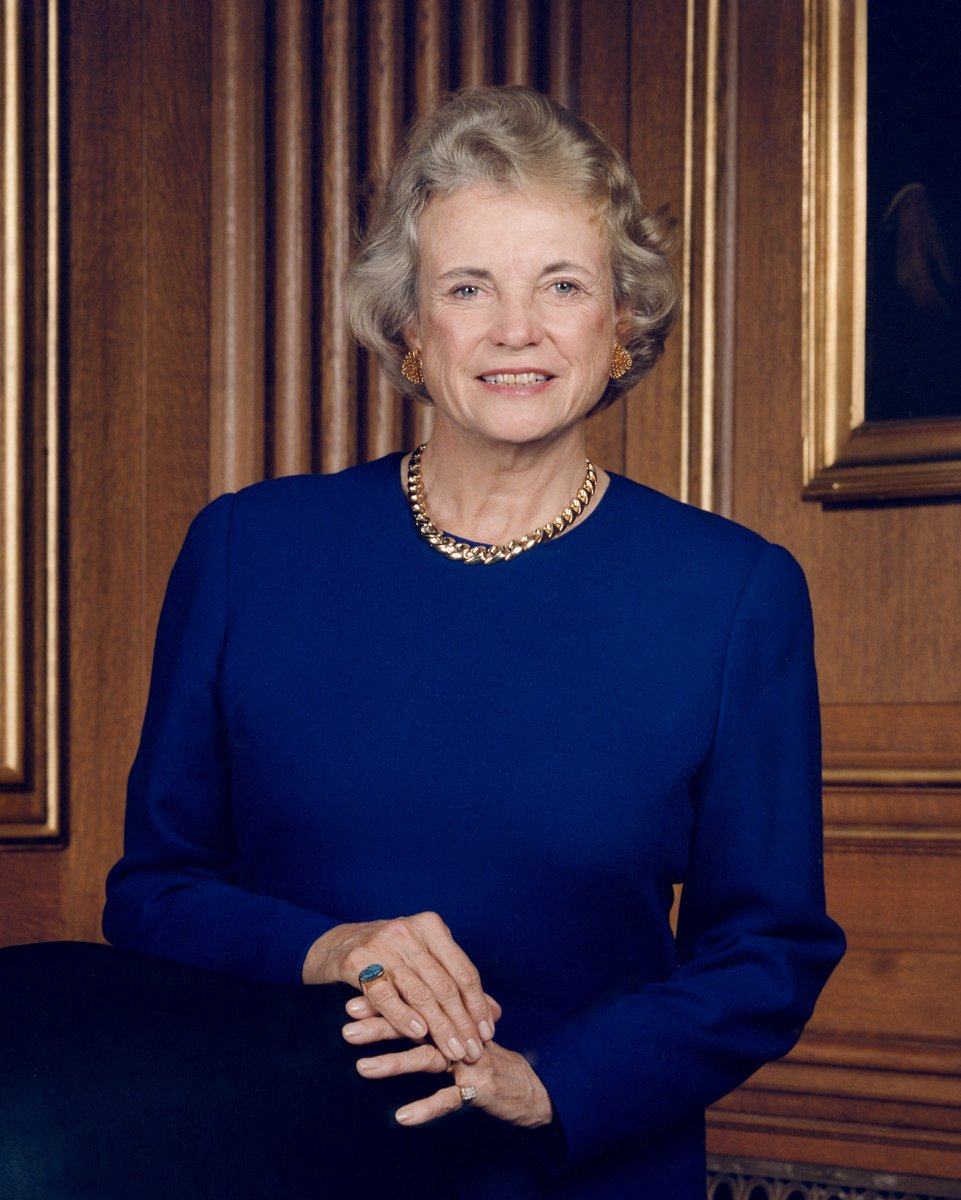
Justice Sandra Day O'Connor, writer of the opinion.

“ This is a maritime case about a train wreck.”

Justice Sandra Day O'Connor, in opening her opinion.

In a unanimous opinion delivered by Justice Sandra Day O'Connor, the Court held that federal law controlled the interpretation of both bills, because they were maritime contracts and the dispute was not inherently local. The Court also held that the 11th Circuit misinterpreted the bills as not protecting Norfolk.

In summary, it was held:

- Federal law governs the interpretation of the ICC and Hamburg Süd bills.

- When a contract is a maritime one, and the dispute is not inherently local, federal law controls the contract interpretation.
- The bills at issue are maritime contracts. To ascertain a contract's maritime nature, this Court looks not to whether a ship or vessel was involved in the dispute, or to the place of the contract's formation or performance, but to the nature and character of the contract.
- The case is not inherently local, and there is a concern for the uniform meaning of maritime contracts. The same liability limitation in a single bill of lading for international intermodal transportation often applies both to sea and to land, as is true of the Hamburg Süd bill. Likewise, a single Himalaya Clause can cover both sea and land carriers downstream, as in the ICC bill. In protecting the uniformity of federal maritime law, this Court also reinforces the liability regime Congress established in COGSA.

- Norfolk is entitled to the protection of the liability limitations in both bills of lading.

- The ICC bill's broadly written Himalaya Clause limits Norfolk's liability. Since Huntsville, Alabama is some 366 miles (589 km) inland from the discharge port, the parties must have anticipated using a land carrier's services for the contract's performance. Because it is clear that a railroad was an intended beneficiary of the ICC bill's broadly written clause, Norfolk's liability is limited by the clause's terms.
- Norfolk also enjoys the benefits of the Hamburg Süd bill's liability limitation. When an intermediary contracts with a carrier to transport goods, the cargo owner's recovery against the carrier is limited by the liability limitation to which the intermediary and carrier agreed.

In Particular, the Court held that the 11th Circuit misinterpreted the Court's previous ruling in Robert C. Herd & Co. v. Krawill Machinery Corp. Herd simply says that contracts for carriage of goods by sea must be construed like any other contracts: by their terms and consistent with the intent of the parties. If anything, Herd stands for the proposition that there is no special rule for Himalaya Clauses:

The expansive contract language corresponds to the fact that various modes of transportation would be involved in performing the contract. Kirby and ICC contracted for the transportation of machinery from Australia to Huntsville, Alabama, and, as the crow flies, Huntsville is some 366 miles inland from the port of discharge.... Thus, the parties must have anticipated that a land carrier's services would be necessary for the contract's performance. It is clear to us that a railroad like Norfolk was an intended beneficiary of the ICC bill's broadly written Himalaya Clause. Accordingly, Norfolk's liability is limited by the terms of that clause.

== Subsequent developments ==
In 2010, Kirby was extended to cover domestic rail shipments for which bills of lading had been issued by domestic rail carriers with respect to shipments originating overseas, in the Supreme Court's ruling in Kawasaki Kisen Kaisha Ltd. v. Regal-Beloit Corp. This effectively overruled the Carmack Amendment, which was previously considered to apply in such circumstances.

The Supreme Court rarely takes on appeals in maritime law cases such as Kirby and Regal-Beloit — in fact, there were none in between these two with respect to a through transport situation, so it is advisable to study both of these cases to assess the current position of the Court. It is also a reason to heed the parting words of Justice O’Connor in Kirby:

Future parties remain free to adapt their contracts to the rules set forth here, only now with the benefit of greater predictability concerning the rules for which their contracts might compensate.
