= Devenpeck v. Alford =

- Supreme Court of the United States

Argued November 8, 2004 Decided December 13, 2004
- Full case name: Devenpeck v. Alford
- Docket no.: 03-710
- Citations: 543 U.S. 146 (more) 125 S. Ct. 588; 160 L. Ed. 2d 537

Case history
- Prior: Alford v. Haner, 333 F.3d 972 (9th Cir. 2003)

Holding
- A warrantless arrest is reasonable under the Fourth Amendment if, given the facts known to the officer, there is probable cause to believe that a crime has been committed, even if the officer identifies a different crime at the time of arrest.

Court membership
- Chief Justice William Rehnquist Associate Justices John P. Stevens · Sandra Day O'Connor; Antonin Scalia · Anthony Kennedy; David Souter · Clarence Thomas; Ruth Bader Ginsburg · Stephen Breyer

Case opinion
- Majority: Scalia, joined by Stevens, O'Connor, Kennedy, Souter, Thomas, Ginsburg, Breyer
- Rehnquist took no part in the consideration or decision of the case.

Laws applied
- U.S. Const. Amend. IV

Devenpeck v. Alford, 543 U.S. 146 (2004), was a United States Supreme Court decision dealing with warrantless arrests and the Fourth Amendment. The Court ruled that even if an officer wrongly arrests a suspect for one crime, the arrest may still be "reasonable" if there is objectively probable cause to believe that the suspect is involved in a different crime. That is, an arrest based on conduct that a person is objectively innocent of may be justified after the fact if the state can articulate any violation of the criminal law based on the same facts. One consequence of this rule is that the more laws there are in a jurisdiction, the more likely an arrest is to be reasonable.

== Background ==
On the night of November 22, 1997, Jerome Alford was driving on Washington State Route 16 when he stopped to assist a stranded vehicle. Alford's vehicle had "wig-wag" headlights, giving it the appearance of a police car. These lights drew the attention of Officer Joi Haner. As Haner approached the stopped vehicles, Alford hurried back to his car and drove off. Officer Haner was concerned that Alford was impersonating a police officer. Haner pursued Alford's vehicle and pulled it over. Haner's suspicions were bolstered when he observed a pair of handcuffs and a police scanner in Alford's car.

Officer Haner's supervisor, Sergeant Devenpeck, arrived on the scene and began questioning Alford. Devenpeck noticed that Alford was covertly recording the conversation using a tape recorder. Believing that the recording was illegal, Devenpeck arrested Alford, citing the Washington Privacy Act.

In fact, recording an officer during a traffic stop is not illegal in Washington, and the charges against Alford were dropped. Alford then brought a civil suit against Devenpeck under §1983, claiming his arrest violated the Fourth Amendment.

The Ninth Circuit ruled that there was no probable cause for Alford's arrest. Taping an officer during a traffic stop was legal, and while there may have been probable cause to arrest Alford for other offenses, including impersonating a police officer or obstructing a public servant, the Court of Appeals ruled that these offenses were not "closely related" to the tape recording, which was Devenpeck's sole stated reason for arresting Alford. In the words of the Ninth Circuit, "probable cause to arrest for other unrelated offenses ... does not cure the lack of probable cause here."

== Opinion of the Court ==
In an 8–0 decision, the Supreme Court reversed the Ninth Circuit. The Court rejected the idea that "the offense establishing probable cause must be 'closely related' to ... the offense identified by the arresting officer."

Justice Scalia's majority opinion stressed that probable cause is an objective standard based on the facts known to the officer, not the officer's reasons for acting. Citing Whren v. United States as precedent, Scalia wrote, "An arresting officer's state of mind (except for the facts that he knows) is irrelevant to the existence of probable cause." As long as probable cause existed to arrest Alford for some crime, Sergeant Devenpeck's explanation of why he was arresting Alford was irrelevant.

The Court remanded the case for the lower courts to determine whether there was probable cause to arrest Alford for impersonating a law-enforcement officer or obstructing a law-enforcement officer.
