= Florida v. Nixon =

- Supreme Court of the United States

Decided December 13, 2004
- Full case name: Florida v. Joe Elton Nixon
- Citations: 543 U.S. 175 (more)

Holding
- Defense counsel's failure to obtain the defendant's express consent to a strategy of conceding guilt in a capital trial does not automatically render counsel's performance deficient.

Court membership
- Chief Justice William Rehnquist Associate Justices John P. Stevens · Sandra Day O'Connor; Antonin Scalia · Anthony Kennedy; David Souter · Clarence Thomas; Ruth Bader Ginsburg · Stephen Breyer

Case opinion
- Majority: Ginsburg, joined by unanimous
- Rehnquist took no part in the consideration or decision of the case.

Florida v. Nixon, 543 U.S. 175 (2004), was a United States Supreme Court case in which the court held that defense counsel's failure to obtain the defendant's express consent to a strategy of conceding guilt in a capital trial does not automatically render counsel's performance deficient.

== Background ==
Joe Elton Nixon

Joe Elton Nixon (born August 23, 1961) was arrested on August 13, 1984 for kidnapping and murder 38-year-old Jeanne Bickner by burning her alive in Leon County on August 12, 1984. Questioned by the police, Nixon described in graphic detail how he had kidnapped and killed the victim. After gathering evidence of his guilt, the state indicted Nixon for first-degree murder and related crimes. Assistant public defender Corin, assigned to represent Nixon, filed a plea of not guilty and deposed all of the State's potential witnesses. Satisfied that Nixon's guilt was not subject to reasonable dispute, Corin commenced plea negotiations, but the prosecutors refused to recommend a sentence other than death. Faced with the inevitability of going to trial on a capital charge, and a strong case for the prosecution, Corin concluded that his best course would be to concede Nixon's guilt, thereby preserving credibility for penalty phase evidence of Nixon's mental instability, and for defense pleas to spare Nixon's life. Corin several times attempted to explain this strategy to Nixon, but Nixon remained unresponsive, never verbally approving or protesting the proposed strategy. Overall, Nixon gave Corin very little assistance or direction in preparing the case.

When trial began, Nixon engaged in disruptive behavior and absented himself from most of the proceedings. In his opening statement, Corin acknowledged Nixon's guilt and urged the jury to focus on the penalty phase. During the state's case in chief, Corin objected to the introduction of crime scene photographs as unduly prejudicial, cross-examined witnesses for clarification, and contested several aspects of the jury instructions. In his closing argument, Corin again conceded Nixon's guilt, declaring that he hoped to persuade the jury during the penalty phase that Nixon should not be sentenced to death. The jury found Nixon guilty on all counts. At the penalty phase, Corin argued to the jury that Nixon was not "an intact human being" and had committed the murder while afflicted with multiple mental disabilities. Corin called as witnesses relatives and friends who described Nixon's childhood emotional troubles and his erratic behavior preceding the murder. Corin also presented expert testimony concerning Nixon's antisocial personality, history of emotional instability and psychiatric care, low IQ, and possible brain damage. In his closing argument, Corin emphasized Nixon's youth, the psychiatric evidence, and the jury's discretion to consider any mitigating circumstances; urged that, if not sentenced to death, Nixon would never be released; maintained that the death penalty was not appropriate for a person with Nixon's impairments; and asked the jury to spare Nixon's life. The jury recommended, and the trial court imposed, the death penalty.

The Florida Supreme Court reversed, holding that a defense attorney's concession that his client committed murder, made without the defendant's express consent, automatically ranks as prejudicial ineffective assistance of counsel necessitating a new trial under the standard announced in United States v. Cronic. Corin's concession, according to that court, was the functional equivalent of a guilty plea in that it allowed the prosecution's guilt-phase case to proceed essentially without opposition. Under Boykin v. Alabama, consent to a guilty plea cannot be inferred from silence; similarly, the Florida court stated, a concession of guilt at trial requires a defendant's affirmative, explicit acceptance, without which counsel's performance is presumably inadequate. While acknowledging that Nixon was very disruptive and uncooperative at trial and that Corin's strategy may have been in Nixon's best interest, the court nevertheless declared that silent acquiescence is not enough: Counsel conceding a defendant's guilt is inevitably ineffective if the defendant does not expressly approve counsel's course.

The Supreme Court granted certiorari.

== Opinion of the court ==
The Supreme Court issued an opinion on December 13, 2004.

In its decision, the Court drew a strong distinction between a guilty plea on the one hand and a plea of not guilty combined with a verbal acknowledgment of the defendant having committed the crimes for which he was being tried on the other. A guilty plea, the court pointed out, would have relieved the prosecution of the obligation to make its case before a judge and jury, which would be a waiver of the defendant’s right to confront the witnesses against him. Instead, by filing his plea as not guilty, Corin had forced the prosecution to prove its case, preserving Nixon’s right (via Corin as his representative) to challenge prejudicial evidence as well as preserving his right to appeal the conviction and sentence.

Because, in the Court’s view, the dispute was over Corin’s choice of courtroom strategy rather than an abrogation of Nixon’s fundamental right to plead not guilty, the evidentiary standard was higher to find ineffective assistance of counsel. Nixon would have to demonstrate that Corin had pursued an unreasonable strategy or had otherwise fully failed to function as Nixon’s advocate. However, in point of fact the trial court had praised Corin’s able defense, according to the Supreme Court, remarking that he had understood the implications of the case against Nixon and had focused adeptly on the most salient aspects in pursuing an argument that Nixon’s psychological defects made the death penalty inappropriate. The Court also noted that in capital cases, the objective of preserving the defendant’s life was understood to be a more pressing goal than securing total acquittal, and that juries in capital cases tended to react unfavorably to an argument of total innocence in the guilt phase followed by an argument of mitigated guilt at sentencing, increasing the likelihood that a defendant pursuing such a strategy would be sentenced to death. Thus, Corin’s strategy was a sound one, based on his experience as a capital defense lawyer.

Thus, ultimately, the Court concluded that a concession of guilt, distinct from a formal guilty plea, constituted a courtroom tactic that did not require the explicit consent of the accused and could not be treated presumptively as ineffective counsel, and that Corin’s trial strategy in Nixon’s case did not show any evidence of being factually ineffective.

== Later developments ==
On August 26, 2021, the Florida Supreme Court denied Nixon's appeal that he is ineligible to be executed. and affirmed both his death sentence
