= Jama v. Immigration & Customs Enforcement =

- Supreme Court of the United States

Decided January 12, 2005
- Full case name: Jama v. Immigration & Customs Enforcement
- Citations: 543 U.S. 335 (more)

Holding
- 8 U.S.C. 1231(b)(2)(E)(iv) permits a non-citizen to be deported to a country without the advance consent of that country's government.

Court membership
- Chief Justice William Rehnquist Associate Justices John P. Stevens · Sandra Day O'Connor; Antonin Scalia · Anthony Kennedy; David Souter · Clarence Thomas; Ruth Bader Ginsburg · Stephen Breyer

Case opinions
- Majority: Scalia, joined by Rehnquist, O'Connor, Kennedy, Thomas
- Dissent: Souter, joined by Stevens, Ginsburg, Breyer

Jama v. Immigration & Customs Enforcement, 543 U.S. 335 (2005), was a United States Supreme Court case in which the court held that 8 U.S.C. 1231(b)(2)(E)(iv) permits a non-citizen to be deported to a country without the advance consent of that country's government.

== Background ==
Title 8 U. S. C. §1231(b)(2) prescribes the procedure for selecting the country to which a non-citizen ineligible to remain in the United States will be deported to. Jama had his refugee status in the United States terminated for a criminal conviction. When he declined to designate a country to which he preferred to be removed, the immigration judge ordered him removed to Somalia, his country of birth, pursuant to §1231(b)(2)(E)(iv). Jama filed a habeas petition to challenge the designation, claiming that Somalia had no functioning government and thus could not consent in advance to his removal, and that the United States government was barred from removing him there absent such advance consent. The federal District Court agreed, but the Eighth Circuit Court of Appeals reversed, holding that §1231(b)(2)(E)(iv) does not require advance acceptance by the destination country.

The Supreme Court granted certiorari.

== Opinion of the court ==
The Supreme Court issued an opinion on January 12, 2005.

The Supreme Court deferred to the executive branch's interpretation of the statute without reference to Chevron deference, which was good law at the time.
