= Commissioner v. Banks =

- Supreme Court of the United States

Argued November 1, 2004 Decided January 24, 2005
- Full case name: Commissioner of Internal Revenue v. John W. Banks II; Commissioner of Internal Revenue v. Sigitas J. Banaitis
- Citations: 543 U.S. 426 (more) 125 S. Ct. 826; 160 L. Ed. 2d 859

Case history
- Prior: Banks v. Commissioner, 81 T.C.M. (CCH) 1219 (2001); affirmed in part, reversed in part, 345 F.3d 373 (6th Cir. 2003); cert. granted, 541 U.S. 958 (2004).; Banaitis v. Commissioner, 83 T.C.M. (CCH) 1053 (2002); affirmed in part, reversed in part, 340 F.3d 1074 (9th Cir. 2003); cert. granted, 541 U.S. 958 (2004).

Holding
- When a litigant's recovery constitutes income, the litigant's income includes the portion of the recovery paid to the attorney as a contingent fee.

Court membership
- Chief Justice William Rehnquist Associate Justices John P. Stevens · Sandra Day O'Connor; Antonin Scalia · Anthony Kennedy; David Souter · Clarence Thomas; Ruth Bader Ginsburg · Stephen Breyer

Case opinion
- Majority: Kennedy, joined by Stevens, O'Connor, Scalia, Souter, Thomas, Ginsburg, Breyer
- Rehnquist took no part in the consideration or decision of the case.

Laws applied
- Internal Revenue Code

Commissioner v. Banks, 543 U.S. 426 (2005), together with Commissioner v. Banaitis, was a case decided before the Supreme Court of the United States, dealing with the issue of whether the portion of a money judgment or settlement paid to a taxpayer's attorney under a contingent-fee agreement is income to the taxpayer for federal income tax purposes. The Supreme Court held when a taxpayer's recovery constitutes income, the taxpayer's income includes the portion of the recovery paid to the attorney as a contingent fee. Employment cases are an exception to this Supreme Court ruling because of the Civil Rights Tax Relief in the American Jobs Creation Act of 2004. The Civil Rights Tax Relief amended Internal Revenue Code § 62(a)(20) to permit taxpayers to subtract certain attorney's fees and costs from gross income in arriving at adjusted gross income. Taxpayers can subtract attorney's fees and costs paid "in connection with any action involving a claim of unlawful discrimination."

== Background ==
In the first case, John W. Banks, II was fired from his job with the California Department of Education. He retained an attorney on a contingent-fee basis and filed a civil suit against his employer alleging employment discrimination against his employer. Banks settled the case for $464,000 and paid $150,000 to his lawyer. The Internal Revenue Service (IRS) contended that the entire amount was income to Banks, a position upheld by the United States Tax Court. The United States Court of Appeals for the Sixth Circuit ruled in favor of Banks, holding the lawyer's share could be excluded from the taxpayer's gross income. The Court of Appeals reasoned the contingent-fee arrangement "is more like a partial assignment of income-producing property than an assignment of income." Under this theory, Banks and his attorney were in effect partners in a joint venture who shared a recovery, and who should each be taxed only on his separate part.

In the second case, Sigitas J. Banaitis, a vice president of the Bank of California, retained an attorney on a contingent-fee basis and sued the bank and its successor in ownership, the Mitsubishi Bank, for interference with his employment agreement and wrongful discharge. The parties settled the case. The defendants paid $4.9 million to Banaitis and $3.9 million to his attorney, following the formula set forth in the contingent-fee contract. The IRS viewed the entire amount as gross income to Banaitis. This view was rejected by the United States Court of Appeals for the Ninth Circuit, which reasoned that because the state law granted attorneys a superior lien in the contingent-fee portion of any recovery, that part of Banaitis’ settlement was not includable as gross income.

Both cases were then heard by the United States Supreme Court.

== Issue ==
The issue presented to the United States Supreme Court was whether the portion of a money judgment or settlement paid to a taxpayer's attorney under a contingent-fee agreement is income to the taxpayer for federal income tax purposes.

== Opinion of the Court ==
The United States Supreme Court held that a taxpayer's income includes the portion of the recovery paid to the taxpayer's attorney as a contingent fee.

== Subsequent developments ==
Successful plaintiffs may face an unintended and unfair tax result because of this ruling. Gross proceeds from settlement or litigation are considered income and the related legal fees are deductible only as an itemized deduction. Some or all of the deduction benefit may be lost because of the 2% limitation on miscellaneous itemized deductions or the loss of the deduction for legal fees for purposes of calculating the Alternative Minimum Tax (AMT) with larger awards. Double taxation of the attorney fees may result because the amount for attorney fees is income to the plaintiff and the attorney who is eventually paid. Some plaintiffs may be put in a worse financial situation after winning a case if the attorney fees far exceeded plaintiff's actual damages.

The impact of this decision may have little impact on future tax disputes involving substantially the same facts. After these cases arose, the Internal Revenue Code Section 62(a)(20), enacted as part of the American Jobs Creation Act of 2004, expressly permits a taxpayer to subtract from his or her gross income, in arriving at adjusted gross income, the "attorneys fees and court costs paid by, or on behalf of, the taxpayer in connection with any action involving a claim of unlawful discrimination" as defined by the Act. The Act was not retroactive and only applied to attorney fees paid after the date of enactment with respect to any settlement or judgment occurring after its enactment. This provision eliminates the double taxation of attorney fees on plaintiff discrimination awards by changing the deduction for attorney fees from itemized deduction to an above the line deduction.

Commissioner v. Banks is still precedent for those contingent fee arrangements not eligible for an above the line deduction, which include claims for defamation, invasion of privacy, and tortious interference with contract.
