= KP Permanent Make-Up, Inc. v. Lasting Impression I, Inc. =

- Supreme Court of the United States

Argued October 5, 2004 Decided December 8, 2004
- Full case name: KP Permanent Make-Up, Inc. v. Lasting Impression I, Inc.
- Citations: 543 U.S. 111 (more)

Case history
- Prior: 328 F.3d 1061 (9th Cir. 2003)
- Subsequent: 408 F.3d 596 (9th Cir. 2005)

Holding
- The defendant in a trademark infringement action may raise a fair use defense without proving that there is no likelihood of confusing the marks.

Court membership
- Chief Justice William Rehnquist Associate Justices John P. Stevens · Sandra Day O'Connor; Antonin Scalia · Anthony Kennedy; David Souter · Clarence Thomas; Ruth Bader Ginsburg · Stephen Breyer

Case opinion
- Majority: Souter, joined by Rehnquist, Stevens, O'Connor, Kennedy, Thomas, Ginsburg; Scalia (not footnotes 4 and 5); Breyer (not footnote 6)

Laws applied
- Lanham Act

KP Permanent Make-Up, Inc. v. Lasting Impression I, Inc., 543 U.S. 111 (2004), was a United States Supreme Court case in which the court held that the defendant in a trademark infringement action may raise a fair use defense without proving that there is no likelihood of confusing the marks. The court's interpretation of the principal federal trademark statute, the Lanham Act, puts the burden to show that a likelihood of confusion exists on the plaintiff as part of their prima facie case. The defendant, on the other hand, has no independent burden to prove that aspect of the infringement allegation is untrue. According to the court, it follows that some level of confusion and fair use can coexist in the trademark system.

== Background ==
=== Trademark law and the likelihood of confusion ===
United States trademark law confers upon proprietors a privilege to use a certain mark to identify their good or service in commerce. Someone else can infringe a trademark by using it to identify their own good or service in commerce without authorization. Although trademark privileges can exist without registering the mark with the United States Patent and Trademark Office (USPTO), doing so confers some legal rights that are otherwise unavailable. Section 32 of the Lanham Act states that those who use marks that are similar or identical to registered marks in such a way as "likely to cause confusion, ... cause mistake, or to deceive ... shall be liable in a civil action by the registrant ...." Where the respective marks are not identical, similarity will generally be assessed by reference to whether there is a likelihood of confusion that consumers will believe the products or services originated from the trademark owner. A plaintiff must prove a likelihood of confusion exists before a court can find a defendant liable for copyright infringement.

=== Word marks and fair use ===
Generally, the Free Speech Clause in the First Amendment to the United States Constitution prevents the government from creating laws that restrict free speech. However, a trademark can be composed of one or more words. The fact that a "word mark" can exist necessarily restricts some speech by people who do not control that word mark.

There are various doctrines within the law intended to balance trademark with free speech policy. The fair use doctrine says that trademark law cannot be used to prevent others from using a word or symbol in accord with its plain and ordinary meaning. The law recognizes two kinds of trademark fair use: nominative fair use and descriptive fair use.

Descriptive fair use was at issue in KP Permanent Make-Up, Inc. v. Lasting Impression I, Inc.. This kind of fair use allows someone to use a word that is also used as a mark when that word has an ordinary, descriptive meaning independent of its use as a mark. So long as the word is used for its descriptive meaning and not as a mark, the use is allowed.

However, as of 2004, there was a circuit split over the application of fair use to trademark uses. Specifically, the Lanham Act describes fair use in Section 33(b)(4). It says that a defendant is not liable for trademark infringement if "use of the name, term, or device ... is a use, otherwise than as a mark, ... of a term or device which is descriptive of and used fairly and in good faith only to describe the goods or services of such party, or their geographic origin ...." The split was about the terms "used fairly" in this section. Considering that the purpose of the Lanham Act was to prevent source confusion, the Ninth and Sixth Circuits held that a mark could not have been "used fairly" if the use created confusion about the source of the good. However, the Second, Fourth, and Seventh Circuits held that a fair use might be confusing because fair use is a statutory defense to the accusation of confusion; that is, fair use is a defense to an accusation of trademark infringement itself.

=== The dispute ===
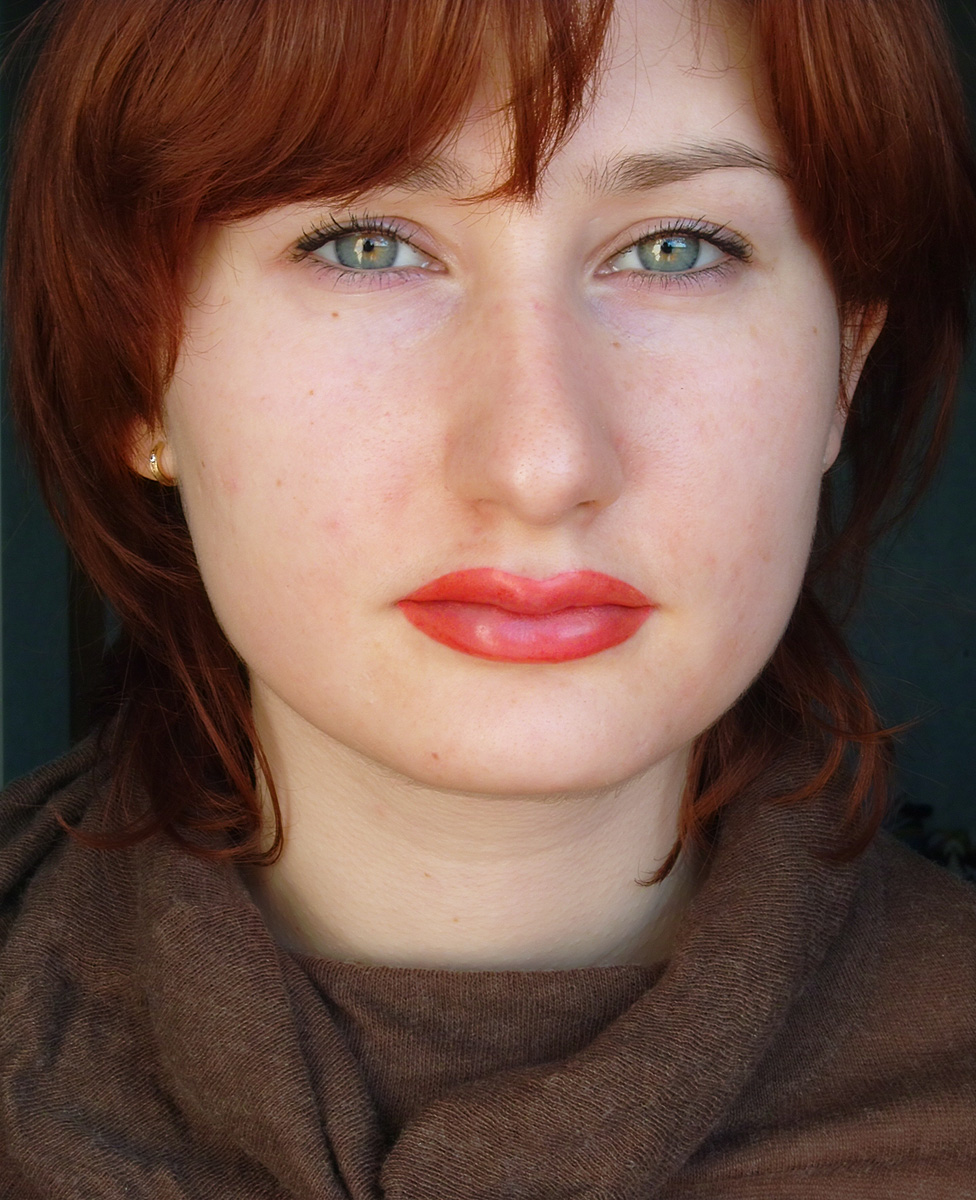
Permanent makeup on the lips

KP Permanent Make-Up and several of its competitors (collectively Lasting) all used the term "micro color" (as one word or two, singular or plural) in marketing permanent makeup. KP claimed that it had used the single-word version since 1990 or 1991. In 1992, Lasting registered a mark that included the words "Micro Colors" with the USPTO. In 1999, the registration became incontestable under the Lanham Act.

When Lasting demanded that KP stop using the term "microcolor", KP sued for declaratory relief. Lasting counterclaimed, alleging, among other things, that KP had infringed Lasting's trademark. KP responded by asserting that their use was not infringement because it was a descriptive fair use. Finding that Lasting conceded that KP used "microcolor" only to describe its goods and not as a mark, the federal District Court held that KP was acting fairly and in good faith because KP undisputedly had employed the term continuously from before Lasting adopted its mark. Without inquiring whether the practice was likely to cause consumer confusion, the court concluded that KP had made out its defense under Section 32(b)(4) and entered summary judgment for KP on Lasting's infringement claim.

The Ninth Circuit Court of Appeals, which had issued previous decisions saying that a confusing use could not be a fair use, decided in favor of Lasting. The Ninth Circuit issued an opinion by Judge Procter Ralph Hug Jr. for a panel of Melvin T. Brunetti, and Diarmuid O'Scannlain, and himself. The opinion held that the district court had erred by addressing the fair use defense without delving into the matter of possible consumer confusion about the origin of KP's goods. Moreover, although the Ninth Circuit did not address the burden of proof in particular, it implied that the burden fell on KP to prove there was no likelihood of confusion in order to argue that its use was descriptive. The Supreme Court granted certiorari to resolve the circuit split on this issue.

J. Thomas McCarthy, the author of a prominent trademark treatise that advocated for the view held by the Ninth Circuit, led the briefing team for Lasting. KP's position received amicus curiae support from the United States federal government including the USPTO, the American Intellectual Property Law Association, and the International Trademark Association, among others.

== Opinion of the court ==
The Supreme Court issued an opinion by Justice David Souter on December 8, 2004. The court observed that Section 33(b) places a burden of proving likelihood of confusion (that is, infringement) on the party alleging infringement even when relying on an incontestable registration. Plus, the description of fair use in Section 33(b)(4) does not mention likelihood of confusion in setting out the elements of the fair use defense in Section 33(b)(4). Further, the court said that requiring the defendant to negate an element of the prima facie case before being allowed to make a defense was simply "illogical" because it would make the defense irrelevant in all cases except when a defense was actually needed. Based on this, the court sided with KP and reversed the Ninth Circuit, putting the burden to prove that a likelihood of confusion exists exclusively on the plaintiff. "[I]t follows," said the court, "... that some possibility of consumer confusion must be compatible with fair use, and so it is."

The court explicitly declined to address the issue further than that because the Ninth Circuit had not done so. Although the KP Permanent Make-Up decision resolved the question of whether confusion and fair use could co-exist, it did not resolve the question of how much they could coexist before an arguably fair use might cross the line into being unlawfully confusing.

The decision was unanimous aside from some footnotes. Without comment, Justice Stephen Breyer declined to join footnote 6, and Justice Antonin Scalia declined to join footnotes 4 and 5. Footnote 5 was a citation sentence highlighting the quotation "Everybody has got a right to the use of the English language and has got a right to assume that nobody is going to take that English language away from him." The speaker of this quotation was the Chairman of the American Bar Association Committee on Trade-Mark Legislation, Wallace Martin.

== Later developments ==
On remand, the same panel on the Ninth Circuit interpreted the Supreme Court's view as an endorsement of the other side of the circuit split, particularly the precedents of the Fourth Circuit. The analysis of fair use as a defense is fact-driven and can be complex. However, the Ninth Circuit was formally considering an appeal of a summary judgment. Because of that, it was obligated to assume facts in the light most favorable to the party that lost below, Lasting. Having done so, the 2005 opinion by Judge Hug ruled in favor of Lasting and reversed the summary judgment so the case could go back to the district court for more analysis.

Although trademark scholars broadly agreed with the result in KP Permanent Make-Up, the case was something of a disappointment to them. Many felt that the follow-up questions about the contours of fair use and confusion coexisting were important and needed to be resolved. One described the December opinion as "just enough to support a vacation".
