= Cooper Industries, Inc. v. Aviall Services, Inc. =

- Supreme Court of the United States

Decided December 13, 2004
- Full case name: Cooper Industries, Inc. v. Aviall Services, Inc.
- Citations: 543 U.S. 157 (more)

Holding
- A private party can seek contribution under CERCLA's §113(f) only after being sued under §106 or §107(a).

Court membership
- Chief Justice William Rehnquist Associate Justices John P. Stevens · Sandra Day O'Connor; Antonin Scalia · Anthony Kennedy; David Souter · Clarence Thomas; Ruth Bader Ginsburg · Stephen Breyer

Case opinions
- Majority: Thomas, joined by Rehnquist, O'Connor, Scalia, Kennedy, Souter, Breyer
- Dissent: Ginsburg, joined by Stevens

Laws applied
- Comprehensive Environmental Response, Compensation, and Liability Act of 1980

Cooper Industries, Inc. v. Aviall Services, Inc., 543 U.S. 157 (2004), was a United States Supreme Court case in which the court held that a private party can seek contribution under CERCLA's §113(f) only after being sued under §106 or §107(a).

== Background ==
The enabling clause of §113(f)(1) of the Comprehensive Environmental Response, Compensation, and Liability Act of 1980 (CERCLA), as added by the Superfund Amendments and Reauthorization Act of 1986 (SARA), provides that any person "may" seek contribution from any other person liable or potentially liable under CERCLA §107(a) "during or following any civil action" under CERCLA §106 (which authorizes the federal government to compel responsible parties to clean up contaminated areas) or CERCLA §107(a) (which empowers the government to recover its response costs from potentially responsible persons (PRPs)). Section 113(f)(1)'s saving clause provides: "Nothing in this subsection shall diminish the right of any person to bring an action for contribution in the absence of a civil action under" §106 or §107. SARA also created a separate express right of contribution, §113(f)(3)(B), for "[a] person who has resolved its liability to the United States or a State for some or all of a response action or for some or all of the costs of such action in an administrative or judicially approved settlement."

Cooper Industries, Inc., owned four Texas properties until 1981, when it sold them to Aviall Services, Inc. After operating those sites for several years, Aviall discovered that both it and Cooper had contaminated them when hazardous substances leaked into the ground and ground water. Aviall notified the State of the contamination, but neither the state nor the federal government took judicial or administrative measures to compel cleanup. Aviall cleaned up the properties under the state's supervision and sold them to a third party, but it remained contractually responsible for $5 million or more in cleanup costs. Aviall sued Cooper to recover its costs. The original complaint asserted, among other things, a claim for cost recovery under §107(a) and a separate claim for contribution under §113(f)(1). Aviall later amended the complaint to, among other things, combine its two CERCLA claims into a single, joint claim that, pursuant to §113(f)(1), sought contribution from Cooper as a PRP under §107(a).

Granting Cooper summary judgment, the federal District Court held that Aviall had abandoned its freestanding §107 claim, and that contribution under §113(f)(1) was unavailable because Aviall had not been sued under §106 or §107. The Fifth Circuit Court of Appeals reversed, holding that §113(f)(1) allows a PRP to obtain contribution from other PRPs regardless of whether the PRP has been sued under §106 or §107. The court reasoned in part that "may" in §113(f)(1)'s enabling clause did not mean "may only."

The Supreme Court granted certiorari.

== Opinion of the court ==
The Supreme Court issued an opinion on December 13, 2004.
