= Stewart v. Dutra Construction Co. =

- Supreme Court of the United States

Decided February 22, 2005
- Full case name: Stewart v. Dutra Construction Co.
- Citations: 543 U.S. 481 (more)

Holding
- A dredge is a "vessel" under the Longshore and Harbor Workers' Compensation Act.

Court membership
- Chief Justice William Rehnquist Associate Justices John P. Stevens · Sandra Day O'Connor; Antonin Scalia · Anthony Kennedy; David Souter · Clarence Thomas; Ruth Bader Ginsburg · Stephen Breyer

Case opinion
- Majority: Thomas, joined by unanimous
- Rehnquist took no part in the consideration or decision of the case.

Laws applied
- Longshore and Harbor Workers' Compensation Act

Stewart v. Dutra Construction Co., 543 U.S. 481 (2005), was a United States Supreme Court case in which the court held that a dredge is a "vessel" under the Longshore and Harbor Workers' Compensation Act.

== Background ==
As part of a project to extend the Massachusetts Turnpike, Dutra Construction Company dug a trench beneath Boston Harbor using its dredge, the Super Scoop, a floating platform with a bucket that removes silt from the ocean floor and dumps it onto adjacent scows. The Super Scoop has limited means of self-propulsion, but it can navigate short distances by manipulating its anchors and cables. When dredging the trench in this case, it typically moved once every few hours. Stewart, a marine engineer hired by Dutra to maintain the Super Scoop's mechanical systems, was seriously injured while repairing a scow's engine when the Super Scoop and the scow collided. He sued Dutra under the Jones Act, alleging that he was a seaman injured by Dutra's negligence, and under §5(b) of the Longshore and Harbor Workers' Compensation Act (LHWCA), which authorizes covered employees to sue a "vessel" owner as a third party for an injury caused by the owner's negligence. The federal District Court granted Dutra summary judgment on the Jones Act claim, and the First Circuit Court of Appeals affirmed. On remand, the District Court granted Dutra summary judgment on the LHWCA claim. In affirming, the First Circuit noted that Dutra had conceded that the Super Scoop was a "vessel" under §905(b), but the circuit court found that Dutra's alleged negligence had been committed in its capacity as an employer and not as the vessel's owner.

The Supreme Court granted certiorari.

== Opinion of the court ==
The Supreme Court issued an opinion on February 22, 2005.
