= Carriage of Goods by Sea Act =

United States statute

The Carriage of Goods by Sea Act (COGSA) is a United States statute governing the rights and responsibilities between shippers of cargo and ship-owners regarding ocean shipments to and from the United States. It is the U.S. enactment of the International Convention Regarding Bills of Lading, commonly known as the "Hague Rules". It was found in Title 46 Appendix of the United States Code, starting at Section 1301, but has been moved to a note in 46 United States Code 30701.

The United States Congress, concerned that the Hague Rules did not offer shippers enough protection against damage to cargo by shipowners, amended the Hague Rules in a number of minor, but important, ways. It increased the amount that shipowners would have to pay cargo owners for damage in transit from GBP 100 per package to US$500 per package or, for goods not shipped in packages, per customary freight unit. This "package limitation" has become one of the most contentious and litigious areas in the field of cargo damage, particularly as it relates to the transportation of goods by ocean shipping containers.

== History of limitation of liability for cargo damage ==
At the time of the passage of COGSA, most cargo was shipped in boxes, crates, and bags. Shortly after its passage, cargo owners determined that cargo could be handled more efficiently if placed on pallets, a process that results in numerous boxes or bags of cargo being consolidated on a single pallet. Shipowners, seeing an opportunity to reduce their liability for cargo damage, argued to the courts that the pallets were now "packages" and that they were entitled to limit their liability to $500 per pallet. Some courts agreed.

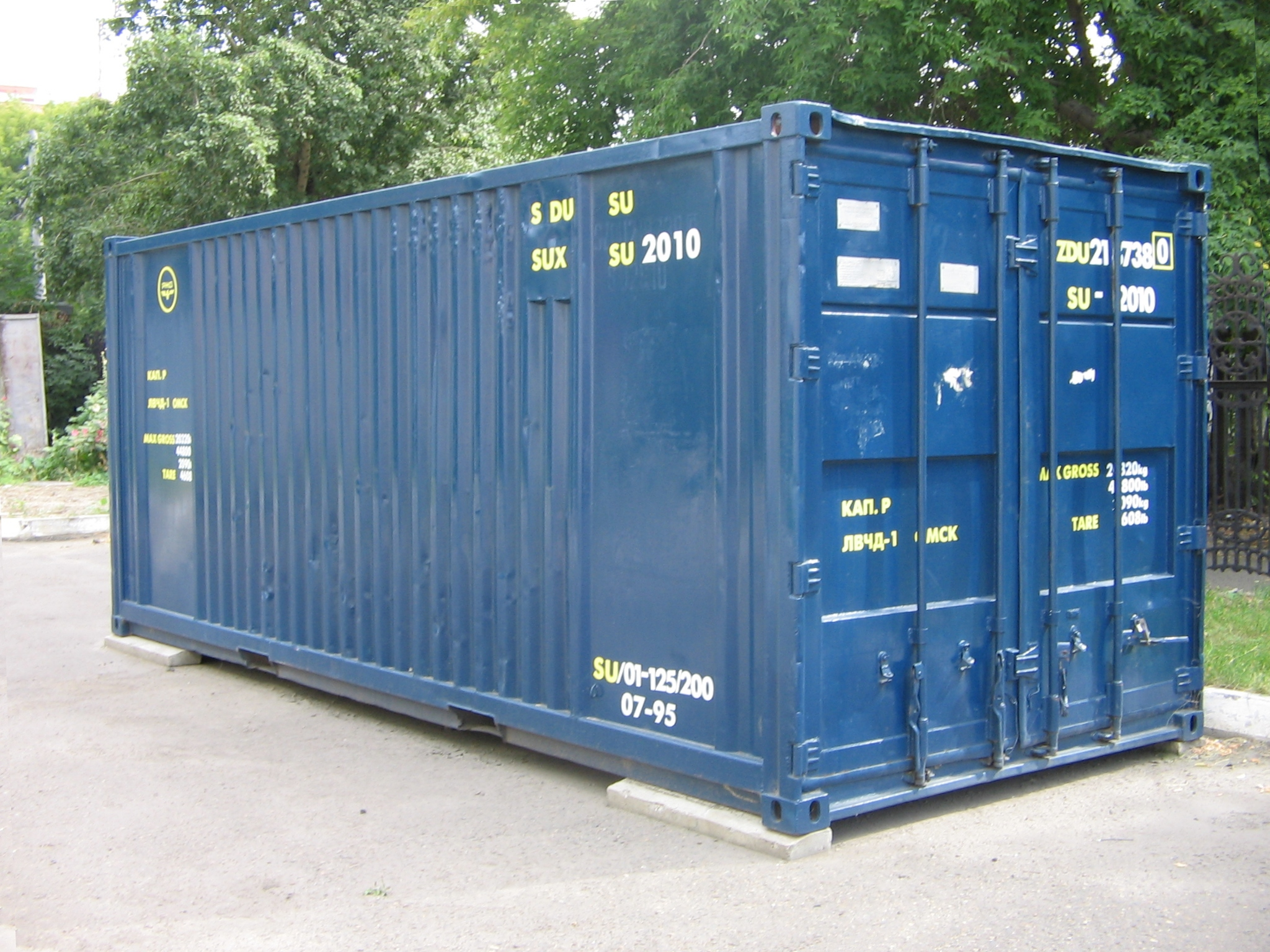
A 20-foot (6.1 m) long ISO container, or TEU.

Later, shipowners began offering cargo owners the opportunity to ship their cargoes in large ocean shipping containers. The containers came in two sizes — 8 feet (2.4 m) high x 8 feet (2.4 m) wide x 20 feet (6.1 m) long (2.4 m x 2.4 m x 6 m) or 8 x 8 x 40 feet (12 m) long. The term "Twenty-foot equivalent unit" or TEU derived from this size - a TEU was a space aboard a ship that was 8 feet (2.4 m) wide by 8 feet (2.4 m) high by 20 feet (6.1 m) long.

Shipowners, again seeing an opportunity to limit their liability, began arguing that the containers were "packages" and that they could limit their liability to $500 per container, even though the contents of a container may be valued at over $500,000. Again, some courts agreed.

It is this imbalance, both in the relative bargaining power of cargo owners, and the superior bargaining power of shipowners, and the imbalance between $500 per container and the true value of a shipment which has led to countless lawsuits and judicial opinions over the "package limitation" problem.

The rest of the world, seeing this as an attempt by shipowners to free themselves from responsibility for protecting cargo, amended the Hague Rules in 1968 with the Visby Amendments which eliminated the "per package" limitation and substituted a limitation per kilogram. In so doing, litigation concerning limitations on liability became virtually non-existent outside the United States. However, Congress failed to pass the Visby Amendments to the Hague Rules.

== Limitation of liability for cargo not shipped in packages ==
Many types of cargo are not shipped in packages such as automobiles, yachts, cranes, and heavy construction equipment. For those cargoes, Congress had intended the limitation on liability for shipowners to be $500 per 100 cubic feet (2.8 m^{3}).

At the time of the passage of COGSA the customary freight unit for most cargo was the "revenue ton" - the number of long tons (2,240 pounds; 1,020 kg or measurement tons (100 cubic feet) that would produce the most revenue for the shipowner. For example, a cargo of aluminium ingots, which were not packaged for shipment, would be heavy and dense, so the customary freight unit for aluminum ingots would be the long ton, a measurement of weight. By comparison, a shipment of canoes, which were not packaged for shipment, would be light but would take up a large volume, ensuring the customary freight unit would be the measurement ton of 100 cubic feet (2.8 m^{3}). If a canoe were 2 feet (0.61 m) wide by 2 feet (0.61 m) high by 10 feet (3.0 m) long (0.6 m x 0.6 m x 3 m), its measurement would be 40 cubic feet (2 x 2 x 10) which would be one measurement ton (anything less than 100 would be 1 by default) and hence the limitation would be $500 per canoe.

The courts, possibly believing that Congress' approach was too cumbersome, jettisoned the word "customary" from the phrase "customary freight unit" and decided that whatever freight unit the shipowner applied would be the freight unit for determining the limitation on liability. Again, seeing an opportunity to limit their liability for cargo damage, shipowners began freighting all cargo by unit, rather than by units of weight or measurement. Consequently, an automobile which might have a volume of 400 cubic feet (11 m^{3}), or 4 measurement tons, which would previously entitle the carrier to a limitation of $2000, was now freighted as "one automobile" thereby reducing the shipowner's liability from $2000 per automobile to $500.

== See also ==
- Seaworthiness (law)
