= Smith v. Massachusetts =

- Supreme Court of the United States

Decided February 22, 2005
- Full case name: Smith v. Massachusetts
- Citations: 543 U.S. 462 (more)

Holding
- Submitting a count to the jury after the judge has granted a mid-trial acquittal subjects a defendant to further factfinding proceedings going to guilt or innocence and violates the Double Jeopardy Clause.

Court membership
- Chief Justice William Rehnquist Associate Justices John P. Stevens · Sandra Day O'Connor; Antonin Scalia · Anthony Kennedy; David Souter · Clarence Thomas; Ruth Bader Ginsburg · Stephen Breyer

Case opinions
- Majority: Scalia, joined by Stevens, O’Connor, Souter, Thomas
- Dissent: Ginsburg, joined by Rehnquist, Kennedy, Breyer

Laws applied
- Double Jeopardy Clause

Smith v. Massachusetts, 543 U.S. 462 (2005), was a United States Supreme Court case in which the court held that submitting a count to the jury after the judge has granted a mid-trial acquittal subjects a defendant to further factfinding proceedings going to guilt or innocence and violates the Double Jeopardy Clause.

== Background ==
Smith was tried before a Massachusetts jury on charges related to a shooting, including unlawful possession of a firearm. At the conclusion of the prosecution's case, Smith moved for a not-guilty finding on the firearm count because "the evidence [was] insufficient as a matter of law to sustain a conviction". The trial judge granted the motion, finding no evidence to support the requirement of the unlawful possession count that the firearm have a barrel shorter than 16 inches. The prosecution rested, and the trial proceeded on the other counts. Before closing argument, the prosecution argued that under Massachusetts precedent, the victim's testimony that the defendant shot him with a "pistol" or "revolver" sufficed to establish barrel length. The judge "reversed" her previous ruling, allowing the firearm count to go to the jury. The jury convicted petitioner on all counts. In affirming, the Massachusetts Appeals Court held that the Double Jeopardy Clause was not implicated because the trial judge's correction of her ruling had not subjected petitioner to a second prosecution or proceeding, and held that the Massachusetts criminal rule used for the acquittal did not prohibit the judge from reconsidering her decision.

The Supreme Court granted certiorari.

== Opinion of the court ==
The Supreme Court issued an opinion on February 22, 2005.
