= Whitfield v. United States =

- Supreme Court of the United States

Argued December 2, 2014 Decided January 13, 2015
- Full case name: Larry Whitfield, Petitioner v. United States
- Docket no.: 13-9026
- Citations: 574 U.S. 265 (more) 135 S. Ct. 785; 190 L. Ed. 2d 656
- Argument: Oral argument

Case history
- Prior: United States v. Whitfield, 548 F. App'x 70 (4th Cir. 2013); cert. granted, 573 U.S. 930 (2014).
- Subsequent: United States v. Whitfield, 651 F. App'x 190 (4th Cir. 2016)

Holding
- The forced accompaniment statute described under 18 U.S.C. §2113(e) does not only apply to cases where the victim was forced to accompany the robber (or attempted robber) over a "substantial" distance.

Court membership
- Chief Justice John Roberts Associate Justices Antonin Scalia · Anthony Kennedy; Clarence Thomas · Ruth Bader Ginsburg; Stephen Breyer · Samuel Alito; Sonia Sotomayor · Elena Kagan

Case opinion
- Majority: Scalia, joined by unanimous

Laws applied
- 18 U.S.C. § 2113(e)

Whitfield v. United States, 574 U.S. 265 (2015), was a United States Supreme Court case in which the court held that the forced accompaniment statute described under 18 U.S.C. § 2113(e) is not limited to cases where the victim was forced to accompany the robber (or attempted robber) over a "substantial" distance.

== Background ==
On September 26, 2008, Larry Whitfield and Quanterrious McCoy attempted to rob a branch of the Fort Financial Credit Union in Gastonia, North Carolina, but were foiled when a metal detector at the entrance went off. The two would-be robbers fled the scene, first by a getaway vehicle that crashed, then by foot. The two ditched their weapons in a wooded area before McCoy hid under a nearby van and Whitfield broke into the home of Mary Parnell, a 79-year-old grandmother with a history of heart disease and high blood pressure. Whitfield tried to assure Parnell he did not intend to hurt her, but asked her to come with him to another area of the house - a room where they could not be seen by the police. When Whitfield tried to call a friend for a new getaway vehicle, Parnell panicked, had a heart attack, and died.

Whitfield was indicted on multiple counts related to the attempted robbery, including under section 2113(e) for forcing Parnell to "accompany" him from one part of her house to another. At his trial, the jury instructions mentioned that "the term 'forced accompaniment' includes... forcing a person to move from one part of a building to another against her will" and "does not require ... that the defendant crossed a property line, moved a person a particular number of feet, held a person for a particular period of time, or placed the person at a certain level of danger." Whitfield pleaded "not guilty" to force accompaniment but a jury convicted him for the offense. Because the crime had a "resulting in death" specification, Whitfield received a mandatory life sentence, albeit this specification was later removed and his sentence was reduced to 27 years.

On appeal, Whitfield's legal team argued the word "accompany" pursuant to section 2113(e) requires a "substantial" amount of forced movement, and because Whitfield had only forced Parnell to accompany him from one room to another (a distance of less than 10 feet) the evidence in this case did not qualify. The Fourth Circuit heard the appeal but affirmed the initial judgement on the offense. In writing for the Court, Judge King stated, "[a]lthough Whitfield required Mrs. Parnell to accompany him for only a short distance within her own home, and for a brief period, no more is required to prove that a forced accompaniment occurred."

== Supreme Court ==
Defense attorney Joshua B. Carpenter argued on behalf of the Petitioner, and Assistant to the Solicitor General Brian H. Fletcher argued on behalf of the Department of Justice.

In a 9–0 decision, Justice Scalia delivered the unanimous opinion on January 13, 2015. In writing for the Court, Scalia argued the word "accompany" has always described any movement in which one "goes with" another over any distance - not just circumstances that could be described as kidnapping - and he specifically cited David Copperfield where Uriah "accompanied me into Mr. Wickfield's room" and Pride and Prejudice where Elizabeth "accompanied her out of the room." Scalia further noted that while bank robbers may always assert some level of control over others, forced accompaniment (such as using a hostage as human shield or forcing a bank employee to walk with the robber to the vault) is distinct from other movement control (such as forcing hostages to lay on the ground or demanding a bank teller to put their hands behind their head), and the danger to the victim posed by forced accompaniment does not vary depending on the distance traversed. He concluded:

We hold that a bank robber "forces [a] person to accompany him," for purposes of §2113(e), when he forces that person to go somewhere with him, even if the movement occurs entirely within a single building or over a short distance. Defined in this manner, Whitfield forced Parnell to "accompany him." §2113(e). The judgment of the Fourth Circuit is affirmed.

== Aftermath ==
Whitfield is currently serving his sentence at Federal Correctional Institution, Fort Dix, and is scheduled for release on November 23, 2031.
