= 2002 term opinions of the Supreme Court of the United States =

October 2002 to October 2003 opinions

The 2002 term of the Supreme Court of the United States began October 7, 2002, and concluded October 5, 2003. The table illustrates which opinion was filed by each justice in each case and which justices joined each opinion.

== Table key ==
Delivered the court's opinion

Joined the court's opinion

Filed a concurrence

Joined a concurrence

Filed a dissent

Joined a dissent

Filed a concurrence/dissent

Joined a concurrence/dissent

Did not participate in the decision
- Decisions that do not note an argument date were decided without oral argument. Decisions that do not note a justice delivering the court's opinion are per curiam.
- Multiple concurrences and dissents within a case are numbered, with joining votes numbered accordingly. Justices frequently join multiple opinions in a single case; each vote is subdivided accordingly.
- An asterisk ( * ) in the court's opinion denotes that it was only a majority in part or a plurality. An asterisk in a joining vote denotes that the justice joined it only in part.
- A dash ( - ) denotes that the justice voted without filing or joining an opinion.

== 2002 term opinions ==
#	Case name and citation	Argued	Decided	Rehnquist	Stevens	O'Connor	Scalia	Kennedy	Souter	Thomas	Ginsburg	Breyer
1	Ford Motor Co. v. McCauley, 537 U.S. 1	October 7, 2002	October 15, 2002									
2	Early v. Packer, 537 U.S. 3		November 4, 2002									
3	INS v. Ventura, 537 U.S. 12		November 4, 2002									
4	Woodford v. Visciotti, 537 U.S. 19		November 4, 2002									
5	Syngenta Crop Protection, Inc. v. Henson, 537 U.S. 28	October 15, 2002	November 5, 2002									
6	Yellow Transportation, Inc. v. Michigan, 537 U.S. 36	October 7, 2002	November 5, 2002									
7	Sprietsma v. Mercury Marine, 537 U.S. 51	October 15, 2002	December 3, 2002									
8	United States v. Bean, 537 U.S. 71	October 16, 2002	December 10, 2002									
9	Howsam v. Dean Witter Reynolds, Inc., 537 U.S. 79	October 9, 2002	December 10, 2002									
10	Abdur'Rahman v. Bell, 537 U.S. 88	November 6, 2002	December 10, 2002									
11	Borden Ranch Partnership v. Army Corps of Engineers, 537 U.S. 99	December 10, 2002	December 16, 2002									
12	Sattazahn v. Pennsylvania, 537 U.S. 101	November 4, 2002	January 14, 2003			*	*	*				
13	Pierce County v. Guillen, 537 U.S. 129	November 4, 2002	January 14, 2003									
14	Barnhart v. Peabody Coal Co., 537 U.S. 149	October 8, 2002	January 15, 2003			1	1			1 / 2		
15	Eldred v. Ashcroft, 537 U.S. 186	October 9, 2002	January 15, 2003		1							2
16	United States v. Jimenez Recio, 537 U.S. 270	November 12, 2002	January 21, 2003									
17	Meyer v. Holley, 537 U.S. 280	December 3, 2002	January 22, 2003									
18	FCC v. NextWave Personal Communications, Inc., 537 U.S. 293	October 8, 2002	January 27, 2003		*							
19	Miller-El v. Cockrell, 537 U.S. 322	October 16, 2002	February 25, 2003									
20	Wa. Dept. of Social and Health Servs. v. Guardianship Estate of Keffeler, 537 U.S. 371	December 3, 2002	February 25, 2003									
21	Scheidler v. National Organization for Women, Inc., 537 U.S. 393	December 4, 2002	February 26, 2003									
22	Moseley v. V Secret Catalogue, Inc., 537 U.S. 418	November 12, 2002	March 4, 2003				*					
23	Boeing Co. v. United States, 537 U.S. 437	December 9, 2002	March 4, 2003									
24	United States v. White Mountain Apache Tribe, 537 U.S. 465	December 2, 2002	March 4, 2003									
25	United States v. Navajo Nation, 537 U.S. 488	December 2, 2002	March 4, 2003									
26	Clay v. United States, 537 U.S. 522	January 13, 2003	March 4, 2003									
27	Connecticut Dept. of Public Safety v. Doe, 538 U.S. 1	November 13, 2002	March 5, 2003		1		2		3		3	
28	Ewing v. California, 538 U.S. 11	November 5, 2002	March 5, 2003		1 / 2	*	1		1 / 2	2	1 / 2	1 / 2
29	Lockyer v. Andrade, 538 U.S. 63	November 5, 2002	March 5, 2003									
30	Smith v. Doe, 538 U.S. 84	November 13, 2002	March 5, 2003		1				1	2	2	2
31	Cook County v. United States ex rel Chandler, 538 U.S. 119	January 14, 2003	March 10, 2003									
32	Norfolk & Western R. Co. v. Ayers, 538 U.S. 135	November 6, 2002	March 10, 2003	* / 1		* / 1		* / 1				* / 1 / 2
33	Cuyahoga Falls v. Buckeye Community Hope Foundation, 538 U.S. 188	January 21, 2003	March 25, 2003									
34	Woodford v. Garceau, 538 U.S. 202	January 21, 2003	March 25, 2003									
35	Brown v. Legal Foundation of Washington, 538 U.S. 216	December 9, 2002	March 26, 2003	1			1	1 / 2		1		
36	Branch v. Smith, 538 U.S. 254	December 10, 2002	March 31, 2003		* / 1 / 2*	*	*	2	* / 1 / 2*	*		* / 1 / 2*
37	Archer v. Warner, 538 U.S. 314	January 13, 2003	March 31, 2003									
38	Kentucky Assn. of Health Plans, Inc. v. Miller, 538 U.S. 329	January 14, 2003	April 2, 2003									
39	Virginia v. Black, 538 U.S. 343	December 11, 2002	April 7, 2003			*	* / 1	2	2	1*	2	
40	PacifiCare Health Systems, Inc. v. Book, 538 U.S. 401	February 24, 2003	April 7, 2003									
41	State Farm Mut. Automobile Ins. Co. v. Campbell, 538 U.S. 408	December 11, 2002	April 7, 2003				1			2	3	
42	Clackamas Gastroenterology Associates, P.C. v. Wells, 538 U.S. 440	February 25, 2003	April 22, 2003									
43	Jinks v. Richland County, 538 U.S. 456	March 5, 2003	April 22, 2003									
44	Dole Food Co. v. Patrickson, 538 U.S. 468	January 22, 2003	April 22, 2003			*						*
45	Franchise Tax Bd. of Cal. v. Hyatt, 538 U.S. 488	February 24, 2003	April 23, 2003									
46	Massaro v. United States, 538 U.S. 500	February 25, 2003	April 23, 2003									
47	Demore v. Kim, 538 U.S. 510	January 15, 2003	April 29, 2003		* / 1	* / 1	* / 1	2	* / 1	* / 1	* / 1	* / 2
48	Roell v. Withrow, 538 U.S. 580	February 26, 2003	April 29, 2003									
49	Illinois ex rel. Madigan v. Telemarketing Assoc., Inc., 538 U.S. 600	March 3, 2003	May 5, 2003									
50	Kaupp v. Texas, 538 U.S. 626		May 5, 2003									
51	Price v. Vincent, 538 U.S. 634	April 21, 2003	May 19, 2003									
52	Pharmaceutical Research and Mfrs. of America v. Walsh, 538 U.S. 644	January 22, 2003	May 19, 2003	*	*	*	1	*		2		* / 3
53	Breuer v. Jim's Concrete of Brevard, Inc., 538 U.S. 691	April 2, 2003	May 19, 2003									
54	Inyo County v. Pauite-Shoshone Indians of Bishop Community of Bishop Colony, 538 U.S. 701	March 31, 2003	May 19, 2003									
55	Los Angeles v. David, 538 U.S. 715		May 19, 2003									
56	Nevada Dept. of Human Resources v. Hibbs, 538 U.S. 721	January 15, 2003	May 27, 2003		1		1 / 2	2	2	2	2	2
57	Chavez v. Martinez, 538 U.S. 760	December 4, 2002	May 27, 2003	1	2* / 1 / 2	1*	1*	2* / 2	2*	1*	2* / 2* / 3	2
58	National Park Hospitality Assn. v. Department of Interior, 538 U.S. 803	March 4, 2003	May 27, 2003									
59	Black & Decker Disability Plan v. Nord, 538 U.S. 822	April 28, 2003	May 27, 2003									
60	Bunkley v. Florida, 538 U.S. 835		May 27, 2003									
61	Beneficial National Bank v. Anderson, 539 U.S. 1	April 30, 2003	June 2, 2003									
62	Dastar Corp. v. Twentieth Century Fox Film Corp., 539 U.S. 23	April 2, 2003	June 2, 2003									
63	Entergy La., Inc. v. Louisiana Pub. Serv. Comm'n, 539 U.S. 39	April 28, 2003	June 2, 2003									
64	Citizens Bank v. Alafabco, Inc., 539 U.S. 52		June 2, 2003									
65	Hillside Dairy, Inc. v. Lyons, 539 U.S. 59	April 22, 2003	June 9, 2003							*		
66	Nguyen v. United States, 539 U.S. 69	March 24, 2003	June 9, 2003									
67	Desert Palace, Inc. v. Costa, 539 U.S. 90	April 21, 2003	June 9, 2003									
68	Fitzgerald v. Racing Association of Central Iowa, 539 U.S. 103	April 29, 2003	June 9, 2003									
69	Dow Chemical Co. v. Stephenson, 539 U.S. 111	February 26, 2003	June 9, 2003									
70	Virginia v. Hicks, 539 U.S. 113	April 30, 2003	June 16, 2003									
71	Overton v. Bazzetta, 539 U.S. 126	March 26, 2003	June 16, 2003		1		2		1	2	1	1
72	Federal Election Commission v. Beaumont, 539 U.S. 146	March 25, 2003	June 16, 2003									
73	Sell v. United States, 539 U.S. 166	March 3, 2003	June 16, 2003									
74	United States v. American Library Association, Inc., 539 U.S. 194	March 5, 2003	June 23, 2003	*	1			1	2		2	2
75	Gratz v. Bollinger, 539 U.S. 244	April 1, 2003	June 23, 2003		1	1			1 / 2 / 3	2	2* / 3	1* / 3 / 3*
76	Grutter v. Bollinger, 539 U.S. 306	April 1, 2003	June 23, 2003	1			* / 1 / 2* / 1	1 / 2		* / 1 / 2 / 1		
77	American Insurance Association v. Garamendi, 539 U.S. 296	April 23, 2003	June 23, 2003									
78	Green Tree Financial Corp. v. Bazzle, 539 U.S. 444	April 22, 2003	June 23, 2003	1		1		1		2		*
79	Georgia v. Ashcroft, 539 U.S. 461	April 29, 2003	June 26, 2003					1		2		
80	Wiggins v. Smith, 539 U.S. 510	March 24, 2003	June 26, 2003									
81	Lawrence v. Texas, 539 U.S. 558	March 26, 2003	June 26, 2003	1			1			1 / 2		
82	Stogner v. California, 539 U.S. 607	March 31, 2003	June 26, 2003									
83	Nike, Inc. v. Kasky, 539 U.S. 654	April 23, 2003	June 26, 2003			2		1	*			2
#	Case name and citation	Argued	Decided	Rehnquist	Stevens	O'Connor	Scalia	Kennedy	Souter	Thomas	Ginsburg	Breyer

== 2002 term membership and statistics ==
This was the seventeenth term of Chief Justice Rehnquist's tenure, and the ninth consecutive term in which the Court's membership had not changed.

Justice		Appointment history		Agreement with judgment		Opinions filed				
Seniority	Name	President	Date confirmed	%	#					Total
Chief Justice	William Rehnquist	Richard Nixon	January 7, 1972	88%	73/83	8	0	0	4	12
Associate Justice	John Paul Stevens	Gerald Ford	December 19, 1975	78%	64/82	9	11	3	7	30
Associate Justice	Sandra Day O'Connor	Ronald Reagan	September 25, 1981	87.8%	72/82	9	6	2	0	17
Associate Justice	Antonin Scalia	Ronald Reagan	September 26, 1986	79.5%	66/83	8	7	2	8	25
Associate Justice	Anthony Kennedy	Ronald Reagan	February 18, 1988	84.1%	69/82	7	6	2	5	20
Associate Justice	David Souter	George H. W. Bush	October 9, 1990	88%	73/83	9	5	2	6	22
Associate Justice	Clarence Thomas	George H. W. Bush	October 23, 1991	73.2%	60/82	7	7	2	11	27
Associate Justice	Ruth Bader Ginsburg	Bill Clinton	August 10, 1993	81.9%	68/83	7	3	1	6	17
Associate Justice	Stephen Breyer	Bill Clinton	August 3, 1994	80.5%	66/82	8	3	3	5	19
Notes on statistics: Opinion counts only include the bench opinions listed above; opinions relating to orders or in-chambers opinions are not included.; Agreement with the Court's judgment does not guarantee agreement with the reasoning expressed in its opinion. A justice is not considered in agreement if they dissented even in part. Agreement percentages are based only on the listed cases in which a justice participated and are rounded to the nearest one-tenth of one percentage point.						Totals				
Notes on statistics: Opinion counts only include the bench opinions listed above; opinions relating to orders or in-chambers opinions are not included.; Agreement with the Court's judgment does not guarantee agreement with the reasoning expressed in its opinion. A justice is not considered in agreement if they dissented even in part. Agreement percentages are based only on the listed cases in which a justice participated and are rounded to the nearest one-tenth of one percentage point.						72	48	17	52	189
