= 2002 term United States Supreme Court opinions of John Paul Stevens =

The 2002 term of the Supreme Court of the United States began October 7, 2002, and concluded October 5, 2003. This was the twenty-eighth term of Associate Justice John Paul Stevens's tenure on the Court.
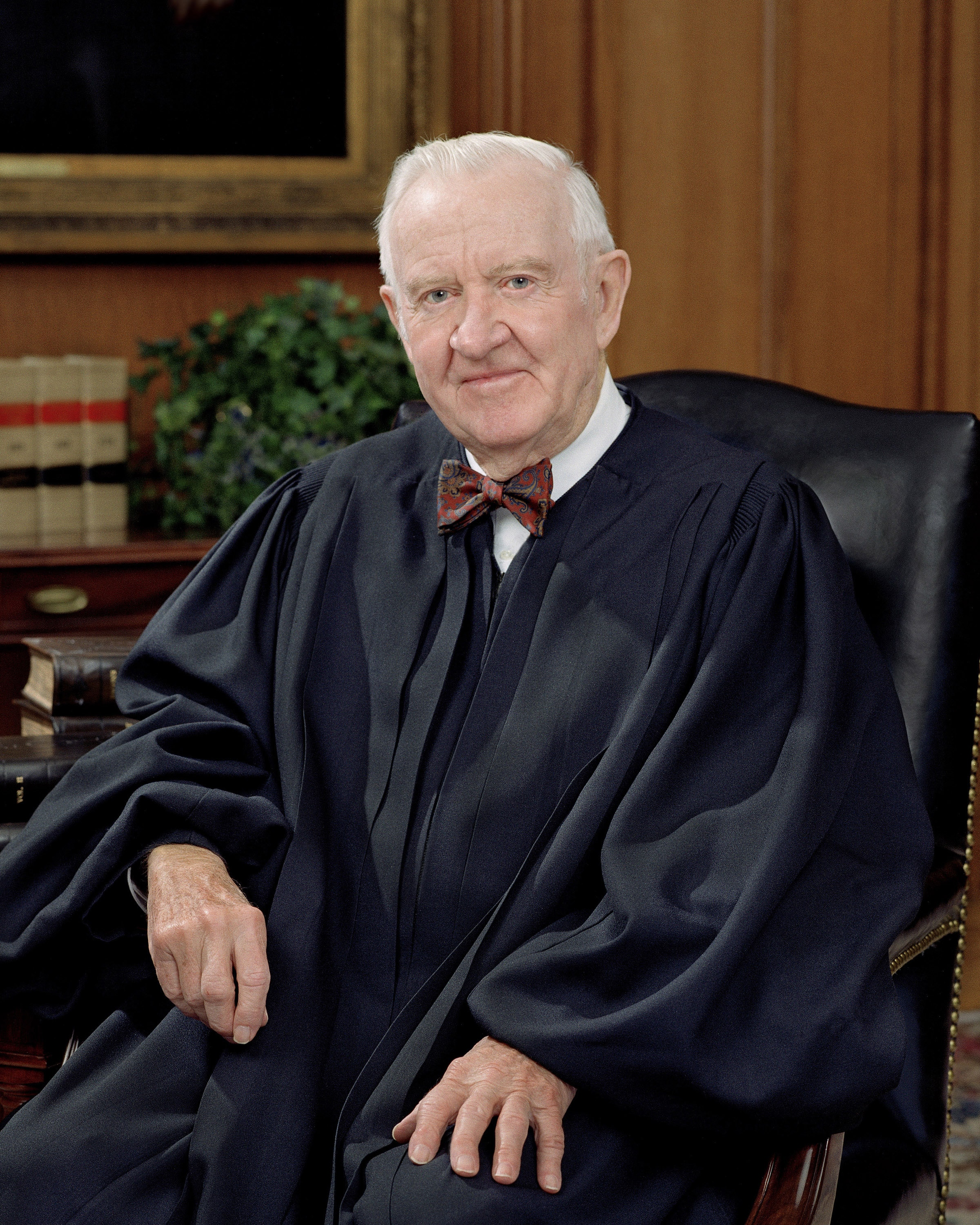

John Paul Stevens 2002 term statistics

9	Majority or plurality	11	Concurrence	4	Other
8	Dissent	3	Concurrence/dissent	Total =	35
Bench opinions = 30		Opinions relating to orders = 3		In-chambers opinions = 2
Unanimous opinions: 1		Most joined by: Souter (15)		Least joined by: Scalia (4)

Type	Case	Citation	Issues	Joined by	Other opinions
	Syngenta Crop Protection, Inc. v. Henson	537 U.S. 28 (2002)			
	Yellow Transportation, Inc. v. Michigan	537 U.S. 36 (2002)			
	Sprietsma v. Mercury Marine	537 U.S. 51 (2002)		Unanimous	
	Abdur'Rahman v. Bell	537 U.S. 88 (2002)			
Stevens dissented from the Court's dismissal of certiorari as improvidently granted.
	Eldred v. Ashcroft	537 U.S. 186 (2003)			
	United States v. Jimenez Recio	537 U.S. 270 (2003)			
	FCC v. NextWave Personal Communications, Inc.	537 U.S. 293 (2003)			
	Scheidler v. National Organization for Women, Inc.	537 U.S. 393 (2003)			
	Moseley v. V Secret Catalogue, Inc.	537 U.S. 418 (2003)		Rehnquist, O'Connor, Kennedy, Souter, Thomas, Ginsburg, Breyer; Scalia (in part)	
	Boeing Co. v. United States	537 U.S. 437 (2003)		Rehnquist, O'Connor, Kennedy, Souter, Ginsburg, Breyer	
	Foster v. Florida	537 U.S. 990 (2002)			
Stevens filed a statement respecting the Court's denial of certiorari, to emphasize that it does not amount to a judgment on the merits.
	Stewart v. McCoy	537 U.S. 993 (2002)			
Stevens filed a statement respecting the Court's denial of certiorari.
	In re Stanford	537 U.S. 968 (2002)		Souter, Ginsburg, Breyer	
Stevens dissented from the Court's denial of a writ of habeas corpus.
	Chabad of Southern Ohio v. Cincinnati	537 U.S. 1501 (2002)			
Stevens granted the application to vacate a stay.
	Connecticut Dept. of Public Safety v. Doe	538 U.S. 1 (2003)			
	Ewing v. California	538 U.S. 11 (2003)		Souter, Ginsburg, Breyer	
	Smith v. Doe	538 U.S. 84 (2003)			
	Brown v. Legal Foundation of Washington	538 U.S. 216 (2003)		O'Connor, Souter, Ginsburg, Breyer	
	Branch v. Smith	538 U.S. 254 (2003)		Souter, Breyer	
	Virginia v. Black	538 U.S. 343 (2003)			
	Clackamas Gastroenterology Associates, P.C. v. Wells	538 U.S. 440 (2003)		Rehnquist, O'Connor, Scalia, Kennedy, Souter, Thomas	
	Pharmaceutical Research and Mfrs. of America v. Walsh	538 U.S. 644 (2003)		Souter, Ginsburg; Rehnquist, O'Connor, Kennedy, Breyer (in part)	
	Inyo County v. Pauite-Shoshone Indians	538 U.S. 701 (2003)			
	Nevada Dept. of Human Resources v. Hibbs	538 U.S. 721 (2003)			
	Chavez v. Martinez	538 U.S. 760 (2003)			
	National Park Hospitality Assn. v. Department of Interior	538 U.S. 803 (2003)			
	Beneficial National Bank v. Anderson	539 U.S. 1 (2003)		Rehnquist, O'Connor, Kennedy, Souter, Ginsburg, Breyer	
	Hillside Dairy, Inc. v. Lyons	539 U.S. 59 (2003)		Rehnquist, O'Connor, Scalia, Kennedy, Souter, Ginsburg, Breyer; Thomas (in part)	
	Nguyen v. United States	539 U.S. 69 (2003)		O'Connor, Kennedy, Souter, Thomas	
	Nguyen v. United States	539 U.S. 126 (2003)		Souter, Ginsburg, Breyer	
	United States v. American Library Association, Inc.	539 U.S. 194 (2003)			
	Gratz v. Bollinger	539 U.S. 244 (2003)		Souter	
	Green Tree Financial Corp. v. Bazzle	539 U.S. 444 (2003)			
	Nike, Inc. v. Klasky	539 U.S. 654 (2003)		Ginsburg; Souter (in part)	
Stevens concurred in the Court's dismissal of certiorari as improvidently granted.
	Prato v. Vallas	539 U.S. 1301 (2003)			
Stevens denied the petitioner's request for an extension of time to pay the docketing fee and printing costs for the petition for certiorari, satisfied that there are no grounds upon which the Court would grant the petition.
