= 2002 term United States Supreme Court opinions of David Souter =

The 2002 term of the Supreme Court of the United States began October 7, 2002, and concluded October 5, 2003. This was the thirteenth term of Associate Justice David Souter's tenure on the Court.
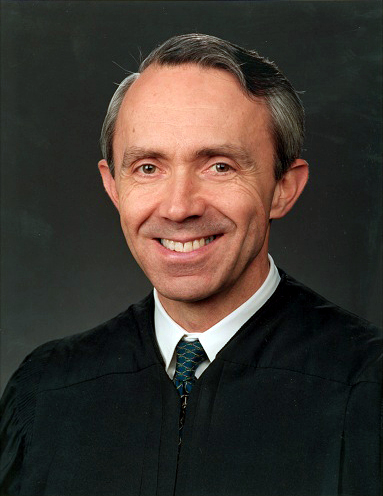

David Souter 2002 term statistics

9	Majority or plurality	5	Concurrence	0	Other
6	Dissent	2	Concurrence/dissent	Total =	22
Bench opinions = 22		Opinions relating to orders = 0		In-chambers opinions = 0
Unanimous opinions: 3		Most joined by: Ginsburg (17)		Least joined by: Scalia, Thomas (3)

Type	Case	Citation	Issues	Joined by	Other opinions
	Barnhart v. Peabody Coal Co.	537 U.S. 149 (2003)		Rehnquist, Stevens, Kennedy, Ginsburg, Breyer	
	Washington State Dept. of Social and Health Servs. v. Keffeler	537 U.S. 371 (2003)		Unanimous	
	United States v. White Mountain Apache Tribe	537 U.S. 465 (2003)		Stevens, O'Connor, Ginsburg, Breyer	
	United States v. Navajo Nation	537 U.S. 488 (2003)		Stevens, O'Connor	
	Connecticut Dept. of Public Safety v. Doe	538 U.S. 1 (2003)		Ginsburg	
	Lockyer v. Andrade	538 U.S. 63 (2003)		Stevens, Ginsburg, Breyer	
	Smith v. Doe	538 U.S. 84 (2003)			
	Cook County v. United States ex rel Chandler	538 U.S. 119 (2003)		Unanimous	
	Woodford v. Garceau	538 U.S. 202 (2003)		Ginsburg, Breyer	
	Virginia v. Black	538 U.S. 343 (2003)		Kennedy, Ginsburg	
	Jinks v. Richland County	538 U.S. 456 (2003)			
	Demore v. Kim	538 U.S. 510 (2003)		Stevens, Ginsburg	
	Roell v. Withrow	538 U.S. 580 (2003)		Rehnquist, O'Connor, Ginsburg, Breyer	
	Breuer v. Jim's Concrete of Brevard, Inc.	538 U.S. 691 (2003)		Unanimous	
	Nevada Dept. of Human Resources v. Hibbs	538 U.S. 721 (2003)		Ginsburg, Breyer	
	Chavez v. Martinez	538 U.S. 760 (2003)		Breyer; Stevens, Kennedy, Ginsburg (in part)	
	Virginia v. Hicks	539 U.S. 113 (2003)		Ginsburg	
	Federal Election Commission v. Beaumont	539 U.S. 146 (2003)		Rehnquist, Stevens, O'Connor, Ginsburg, Breyer	
	United States v. American Library Association, Inc.	539 U.S. 194 (2003)		Ginsburg	
	Gratz v. Bollinger	539 U.S. 244 (2003)		Ginsburg (in part)	
	American Insurance Association v. Garamendi	539 U.S. 296 (2003)		Rehnquist, O'Connor, Kennedy, Breyer	
	Georgia v. Ashcroft	539 U.S. 461 (2003)		Stevens, Ginsburg, Breyer	
