= 2002 term United States Supreme Court opinions of Anthony Kennedy =

The 2002 term of the Supreme Court of the United States began October 7, 2002, and concluded October 5, 2003. This was the sixteenth term of Associate Justice Anthony Kennedy's tenure on the Court.
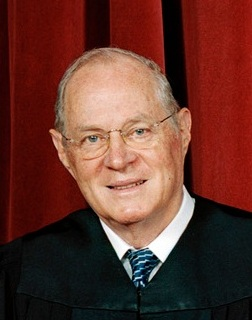

Anthony Kennedy 2002 term statistics

7	Majority or plurality	6	Concurrence	1	Other
6	Dissent	2	Concurrence/dissent	Total =	22
Bench opinions = 20		Opinions relating to orders = 1		In-chambers opinions = 1
Unanimous opinions: 1		Most joined by: Rehnquist, Stevens, Breyer (8)		Least joined by: Thomas, Ginsburg (5)

Type	Case	Citation	Issues	Joined by	Other opinions
	Miller-El v. Cockrell	537 U.S. 322 (2003)		Rehnquist, Stevens, O'Connor, Scalia, Souter, Ginsburg, Breyer	
	Moseley v. V Secret Catalogue, Inc.	537 U.S. 418 (2003)			
	Price v. United States	537 U.S. 1152 (2003)			
Kennedy dissented from the Court's order granting certiorari, vacating judgment, and remanding.
	Smith v. Doe	538 U.S. 84 (2003)		Rehnquist, O'Connor, Scalia, Thomas	
	Norfolk & Western R. Co. v. Ayers	538 U.S. 135 (2003)		Rehnquist, O'Connor, Breyer	
	Brown v. Legal Foundation of Washington	538 U.S. 216 (2003)			
	Branch v. Smith	538 U.S. 254 (2003)		Stevens, Souter, Breyer (in part)	
	State Farm Mut. Automobile Ins. Co. v. Campbell	538 U.S. 408 (2003)		Rehnquist, Stevens, O'Connor, Souter, Breyer	
	Dole Food Co. v. Patrickson	538 U.S. 468 (2003)		Rehnquist, Stevens, Scalia, Souter, Thomas, Ginsburg; O'Connor, Breyer (in part)	
	Massaro v. United States	538 U.S. 500 (2003)		Unanimous	
	Demore v. Kim	538 U.S. 510 (2003)			
	Nevada Dept. of Human Resources v. Hibbs	538 U.S. 721 (2003)	State sovereignty • Family and Medical Leave Act	Scalia, Thomas	
	Chavez v. Martinez	538 U.S. 760 (2003)		Stevens; Ginsburg (in part)	
	Kenyeres v. Ashcroft	538 U.S. 1301 (2003)			
Kennedy denied an application for a stay.
	Overton v. Bazzetta	539 U.S. 126 (2003)		Rehnquist, Stevens, O'Connor, Souter, Ginsburg, Breyer	
	Federal Election Commission v. Beaumont	539 U.S. 146 (2003)			
	United States v. American Library Association, Inc.	539 U.S. 194 (2003)			
	Grutter v. Bollinger	539 U.S. 306 (2003)			
	Georgia v. Ashcroft	539 U.S. 461 (2003)			
	Lawrence v. Texas	539 U.S. 558 (2003)		Stevens, Souter, Ginsburg, Breyer	
	Stogner v. California	539 U.S. 607 (2003)		Rehnquist, Scalia, Thomas	
	Nike, Inc. v. Klasky	539 U.S. 654 (2003)			
Kennedy filed an unelaborated dissent from the Court's per curiam dismissal of certiorari as improvidently granted.
