= 2002 term United States Supreme Court opinions of Clarence Thomas =

The 2002 term of the Supreme Court of the United States began October 7, 2002, and concluded October 5, 2003. This was the twelfth term of Associate Justice Clarence Thomas's tenure on the Court.
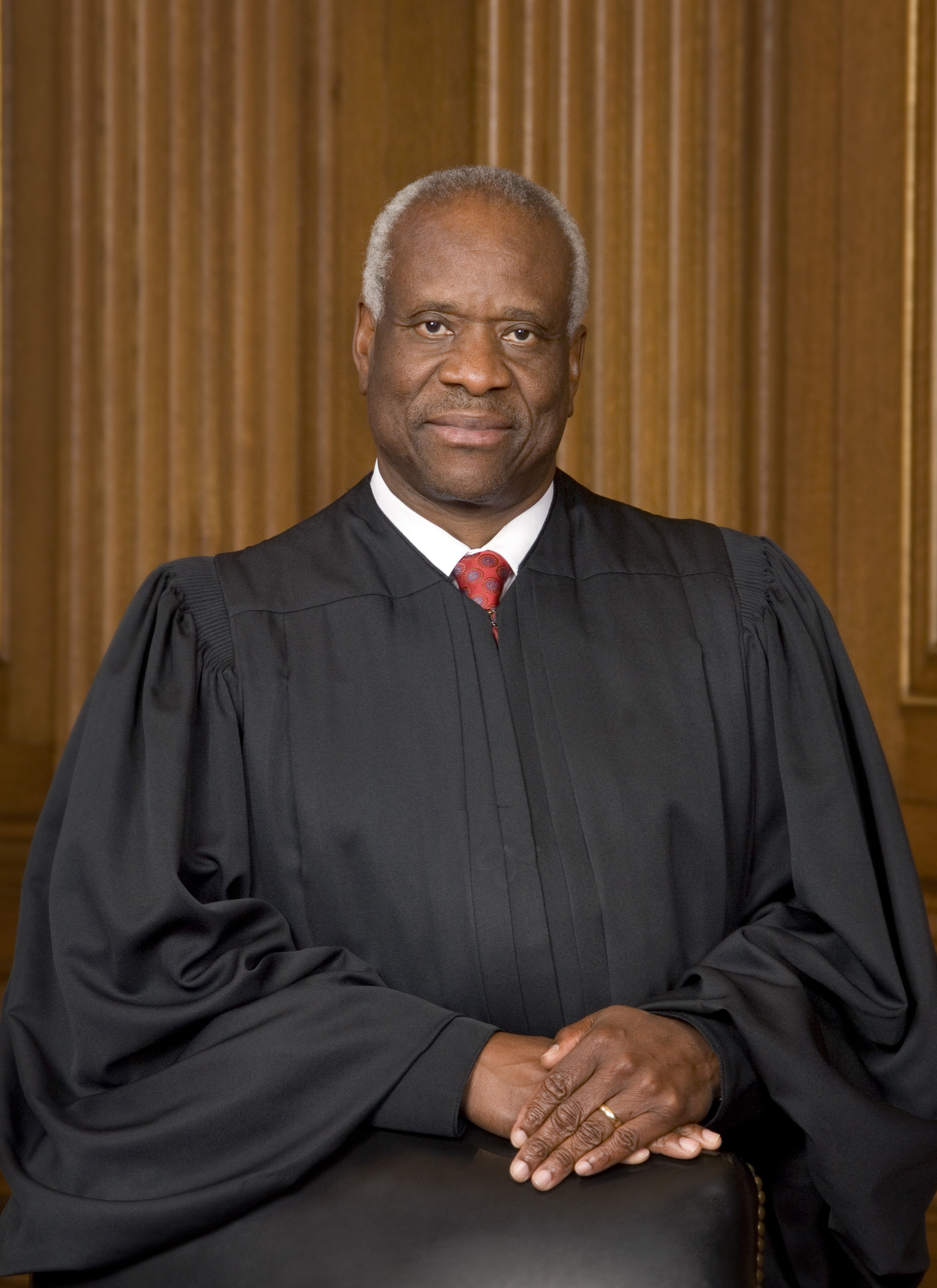

Clarence Thomas 2002 term statistics

| 7 | Majority or plurality | 8 | Concurrence | 0 | Other |
| 12 | Dissent | 2 | Concurrence/dissent | Total = | 29 |
| Bench opinions = 27 | | Opinions relating to orders = 2 | | In-chambers opinions = 0 |
| Unanimous opinions: 4 | | Most joined by: Scalia (13) | | Least joined by: Breyer (4) |

| Type | Case | Citation | Issues | Joined by | Other opinions |
|---|---|---|---|---|---|
| | United States v. Bean | 537 U.S. 71 (2002) | | Unanimous | |
| | Howsam v. Dean Witter Reynolds, Inc. | 537 U.S. 79 (2002) | | | |
| | Pierce County v. Guillen | 537 U.S. 129 (2003) | | Unanimous | |
| | Barnhart v. Peabody Coal Co. | 537 U.S. 149 (2003) | | | |
| | Miller-El v. Cockrell | 537 U.S. 322 (2003) | | | |
| | Boeing Co. v. United States | 537 U.S. 437 (2003) | | Scalia | |
| | United States v. White Mountain Apache Tribe | 537 U.S. 465 (2003) | | Rehnquist, Scalia, Kennedy | |
| | Foster v. Florida | 537 U.S. 990 (2002) | | | |
Thomas concurred in the Court's denial of certiorari, and responded to Breyer's dissent.
| | Borgner v. Florida Bd. of Dentistry | 537 U.S. 1080 (2002) | First Amendment • free speech • commercial speech | | |
Thomas dissented from the Court's denial of certiorari.
| | Ewing v. California | 538 U.S. 11 (2003) | | | |
| | Smith v. Doe | 538 U.S. 84 (2003) | | | |
| | Woodford v. Garceau | 538 U.S. 202 (2003) | | Rehnquist, Stevens, Scalia, Kennedy | |
| | Archer v. Warner | 538 U.S. 314 (2003) | | Stevens | |
| | Virginia v. Black | 538 U.S. 343 (2003) | | | |
| | State Farm Mut. Automobile Ins. Co. v. Campbell | 538 U.S. 408 (2003) | | | |
| | Roell v. Withrow | 538 U.S. 580 (2003) | | Stevens, Scalia, Kennedy | |
| | Pharmaceutical Research and Mfrs. of America v. Walsh | 538 U.S. 644 (2003) | | | |
| | Chavez v. Martinez | 538 U.S. 760 (2003) | | Rehnquist; O'Connor, Scalia (in part) | |
| | National Park Hospitality Assn. v. Department of Interior | 538 U.S. 803 (2003) | | Rehnquist, Scalia, Kennedy, Souter, Ginsburg | |
| | Entergy La., Inc. v. Louisiana Pub. Serv. Comm'n | 539 U.S. 39 (2003) | | Unanimous | |
| | Hillside Dairy, Inc. v. Lyons | 539 U.S. 59 (2003) | | | |
| | Desert Palace, Inc. v. Costa | 539 U.S. 90 (2003) | | Unanimous | |
| | Overton v. Bazzetta | 539 U.S. 126 (2003) | | Scalia | |
| | Federal Election Commission v. Beaumont | 539 U.S. 146 (2003) | | Scalia | |
| | Gratz v. Bollinger | 539 U.S. 244 (2003) | | | |
| | Grutter v. Bollinger | 539 U.S. 306 (2003) | | Scalia (in part) | |
| | Green Tree Financial Corp. v. Bazzle | 539 U.S. 444 (2003) | | | |
| | Georgia v. Ashcroft | 539 U.S. 461 (2003) | | | |
| | Lawrence v. Texas | 539 U.S. 558 (2003) | | | |
