= 2002 term United States Supreme Court opinions of Ruth Bader Ginsburg =

The 2002 term of the Supreme Court of the United States began October 7, 2002, and concluded October 5, 2003. This was the tenth term of Associate Justice Ruth Bader Ginsburg's tenure on the Court.
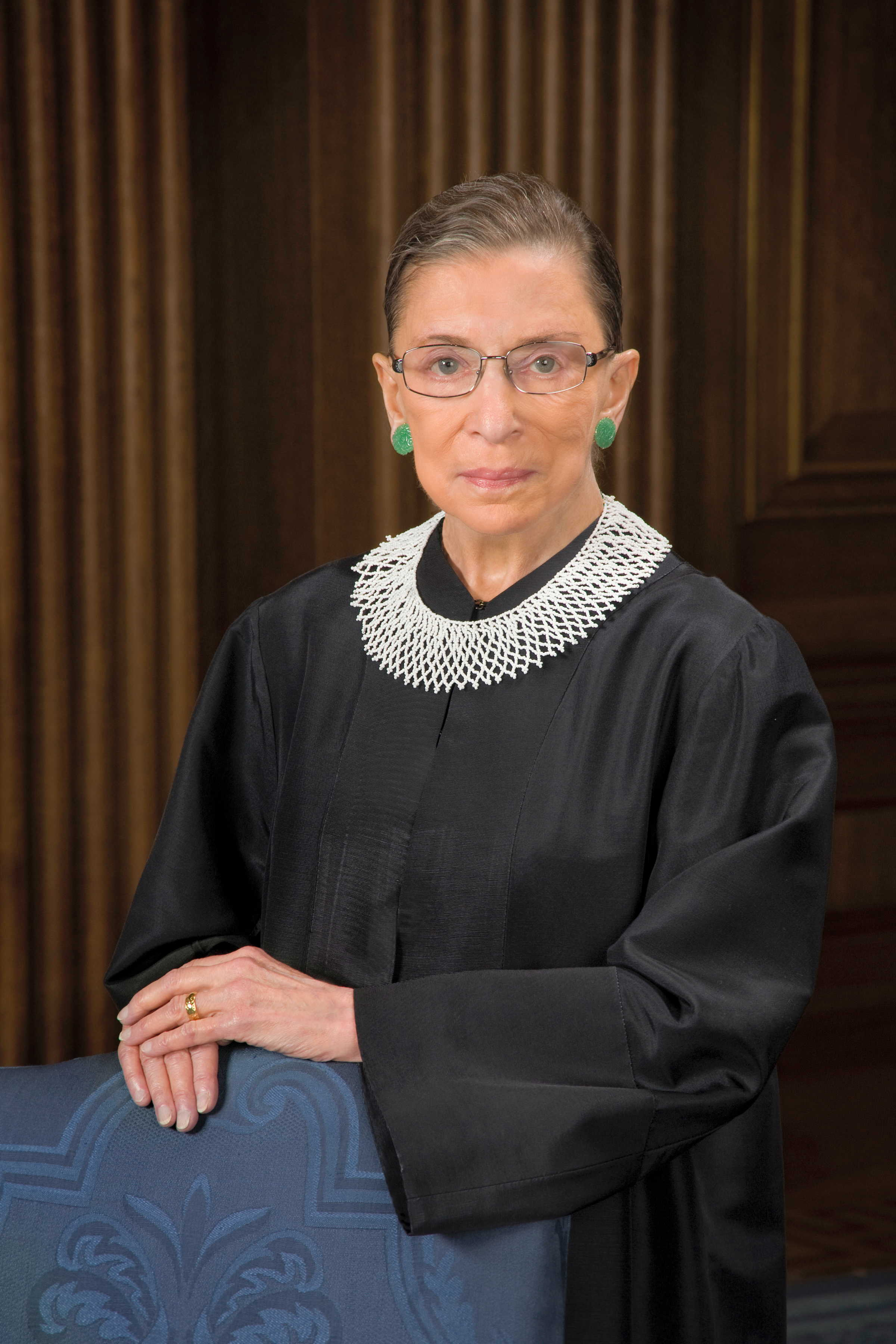

Ruth Bader Ginsburg 2002 term statistics

7	Majority or plurality	3	Concurrence	0	Other
6	Dissent	1	Concurrence/dissent	Total =	17
Bench opinions = 17		Opinions relating to orders = 0		In-chambers opinions = 0
Unanimous opinions: 3		Most joined by: Breyer (13)		Least joined by: Stevens, O'Connor (6)

Type	Case	Citation	Issues	Joined by	Other opinions
	Sattazahn v. Pennsylvania	537 U.S. 101 (2003)		Stevens, Souter, Breyer	
	Eldred v. Ashcroft	537 U.S. 186 (2003)		Rehnquist, O'Connor, Scalia, Kennedy, Souter, Thomas	
	Scheidler v. National Organization for Women, Inc.	537 U.S. 393 (2003)		Breyer	
	United States v. White Mountain Apache Tribe	537 U.S. 465 (2003)		Breyer	
	United States v. Navajo Nation	537 U.S. 488 (2003)		Rehnquist, Scalia, Kennedy, Thomas, Breyer	
	Clay v. United States	537 U.S. 522 (2003)		Unanimous	
	Smith v. Doe	538 U.S. 84 (2003)		Breyer	
	Norfolk & Western R. Co. v. Ayers	538 U.S. 135 (2003)		Stevens, Scalia, Souter, Thomas; Rehnquist, O'Connor, Kennedy, Breyer (in part)	
	State Farm Mut. Automobile Ins. Co. v. Campbell	538 U.S. 408 (2003)			
	Clackamas Gastroenterology Associates, P.C. v. Wells	538 U.S. 440 (2003)		Breyer	
	Illinois ex rel. Madigan v. Telemarketing Assoc., Inc.	538 U.S. 600 (2003)		Unanimous	
	Inyo County v. Pauite-Shoshone Indians	538 U.S. 701 (2003)		Rehnquist, O'Connor, Scalia, Kennedy, Souter, Thomas, Breyer	
	Chavez v. Martinez	538 U.S. 760 (2003)			
	Black & Decker Disability Plan v. Nord	538 U.S. 822 (2003)		Unanimous	
	Gratz v. Bollinger	539 U.S. 244 (2003)		Souter; Breyer (in part)	
	Grutter v. Bollinger	539 U.S. 306 (2003)		Breyer	
	American Insurance Association v. Garamendi	539 U.S. 296 (2003)		Stevens, Scalia, Thomas	
