= 2002 term United States Supreme Court opinions of William Rehnquist =

The 2002 term of the Supreme Court of the United States began October 7, 2002, and concluded October 5, 2003. This was the thirty-first term of Chief Justice William Rehnquist's tenure on the Court and the seventeenth term as Chief Justice.
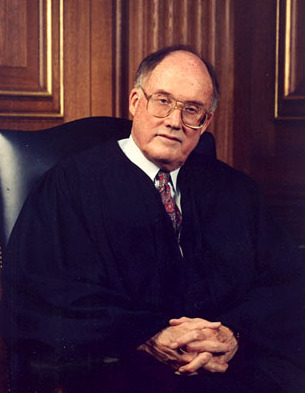

William Rehnquist 2002 term statistics

| 8 | Majority or plurality | 0 | Concurrence | 0 | Other |
| 4 | Dissent | 0 | Concurrence/dissent | Total = | 12 |
| Bench opinions = 12 | | Opinions relating to orders = 0 | | In-chambers opinions = 0 |
| Unanimous opinions: 2 | | Most joined by: O'Connor, Scalia, Kennedy, Thomas (9) | | Least joined by: Stevens (3) |

| Type | Case | Citation | Issues | Joined by | Other opinions |
|---|---|---|---|---|---|
| | Syngenta Crop Protection, Inc. v. Henson | 537 U.S. 28 (2002) | | Unanimous | |
| | Scheidler v. National Organization for Women, Inc. | 537 U.S. 393 (2003) | | O'Connor, Scalia, Kennedy, Souter, Thomas, Ginsburg, Breyer | |
| | Connecticut Dept. of Public Safety v. Doe | 538 U.S. 1 (2003) | | O'Connor, Scalia, Kennedy, Souter, Thomas, Ginsburg, Breyer | |
| | Demore v. Kim | 538 U.S. 510 (2003) | | Kennedy; Stevens, O'Connor, Scalia, Souter, Thomas, Ginsburg, Breyer (in part) | |
| | Price v. Vincent | 538 U.S. 634 (2003) | | Unanimous | |
| | Nevada Dept. of Human Resources v. Hibbs | 538 U.S. 721 (2003) | | O'Connor, Souter, Ginsburg, Breyer | |
| | Bunkley v. Florida | 538 U.S. 835 (2003) | | Kennedy, Thomas | |
| | Nguyen v. United States | 539 U.S. 69 (2003) | | Scalia, Ginsburg, Breyer | |
| | United States v. American Library Association, Inc. | 539 U.S. 194 (2003) | | O'Connor, Scalia, Thomas | |
| | Gratz v. Bollinger | 539 U.S. 244 (2003) | | O'Connor, Scalia, Kennedy, Thomas | |
| | Grutter v. Bollinger | 539 U.S. 306 (2003) | | Scalia, Kennedy, Thomas | |
| | Green Tree Financial Corp. v. Bazzle | 539 U.S. 444 (2003) | | O'Connor, Kennedy | |
