= 2002 term United States Supreme Court opinions of Antonin Scalia =

The 2002 term of the Supreme Court of the United States began October 7, 2002, and concluded October 5, 2003. This was the seventeenth term of Associate Justice Antonin Scalia's tenure on the Court.
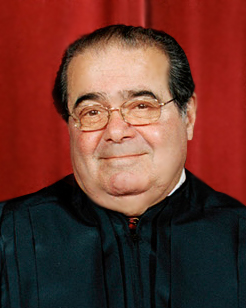

Antonin Scalia 2002 term statistics

| 8 | Majority or plurality | 7 | Concurrence | 0 | Other |
| 9 | Dissent | 2 | Concurrence/dissent | Total = | 26 |
| Bench opinions = 25 | | Opinions relating to orders = 1 | | In-chambers opinions = 0 |
| Unanimous opinions: 3 | | Most joined by: Thomas (18) | | Least joined by: Breyer (5) |

| Type | Case | Citation | Issues | Joined by | Other opinions |
|---|---|---|---|---|---|
| | Sattazahn v. Pennsylvania | 537 U.S. 101 (2003) | | Rehnquist, Thomas; O'Connor, Kennedy (in part) | |
| | Barnhart v. Peabody Coal Co. | 537 U.S. 149 (2003) | | O'Connor, Thomas | |
| | FCC v. NextWave Personal Communications, Inc. | 537 U.S. 293 (2003) | | Rehnquist, O'Connor, Kennedy, Souter, Thomas, Ginsburg; Stevens (in part) | |
| | Miller-El v. Cockrell | 537 U.S. 322 (2003) | | | |
| | Price v. United States | 537 U.S. 1152 (2003) | | Rehnquist, Thomas | |
Scalia dissented from the Court's order granting certiorari, vacating judgment, and remanding.
| | Connecticut Dept. of Public Safety v. Doe | 538 U.S. 1 (2003) | | | |
| | Ewing v. California | 538 U.S. 11 (2003) | | | |
| | Cuyahoga Falls v. Buckeye Community Hope Foundation | 538 U.S. 188 (2003) | | Thomas | |
| | Brown v. Legal Foundation of Washington | 538 U.S. 216 (2003) | | Rehnquist, Kennedy, Thomas | |
| | Branch v. Smith | 538 U.S. 254 (2003) | | Rehnquist, Souter, Ginsburg; Stevens, O'Connor, Kennedy, Thomas, Breyer (in part) | |
| | Kentucky Assn. of Health Plans, Inc. v. Miller | 538 U.S. 329 (2003) | | Unanimous | |
| | Virginia v. Black | 538 U.S. 343 (2003) | | Thomas (in part) | |
| | PacifiCare Health Systems, Inc. v. Book | 538 U.S. 401 (2003) | | Rehnquist, Stevens, O'Connor, Kennedy, Souter, Ginsburg, Breyer | |
| | State Farm Mut. Automobile Ins. Co. v. Campbell | 538 U.S. 408 (2003) | | | |
| | Jinks v. Richland County | 538 U.S. 456 (2003) | | Unanimous | |
| | Illinois ex rel. Madigan v. Telemarketing Assoc., Inc. | 538 U.S. 600 (2003) | | Thomas | |
| | Pharmaceutical Research and Mfrs. of America v. Walsh | 538 U.S. 644 (2003) | | | |
| | Nevada Dept. of Human Resources v. Hibbs | 538 U.S. 721 (2003) | | | |
| | Chavez v. Martinez | 538 U.S. 760 (2003) | | | |
| | Beneficial National Bank v. Anderson | 539 U.S. 1 (2003) | | Thomas | |
| | Dastar Corp. v. Twentieth Century Fox Film Corp. | 539 U.S. 23 (2003) | | Rehnquist, Stevens, O'Connor, Kennedy, Souter, Thomas, Ginsburg | |
| | Virginia v. Hicks | 539 U.S. 113 (2003) | | Unanimous | |
| | Sell v. United States | 539 U.S. 166 (2003) | | O'Connor, Thomas | |
| | Grutter v. Bollinger | 539 U.S. 306 (2003) | | Thomas | |
| | Wiggins v. Smith | 539 U.S. 510 (2003) | | Thomas | |
| | Lawrence v. Texas | 539 U.S. 558 (2003) | | Rehnquist, Thomas | |
