= 2002 term United States Supreme Court opinions of Stephen Breyer =

The 2002 term of the Supreme Court of the United States began October 7, 2002, and concluded October 5, 2003. This was the ninth term of Associate Justice Stephen Breyer's tenure on the Court.
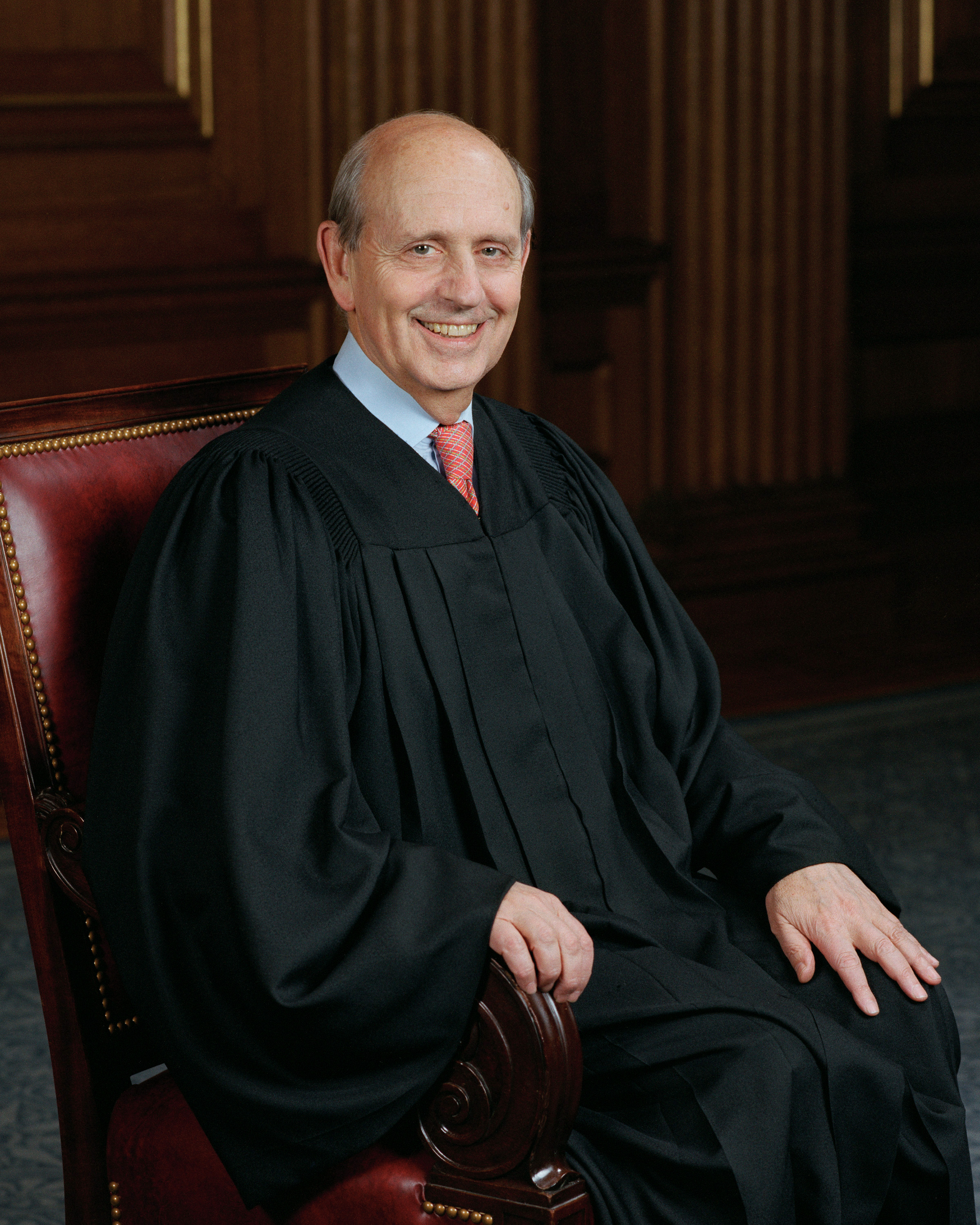

Stephen Breyer 2002 term statistics

8	Majority or plurality	3	Concurrence	0	Other
6	Dissent	3	Concurrence/dissent	Total =	20
Bench opinions = 19		Opinions relating to orders = 1		In-chambers opinions = 0
Unanimous opinions: 2		Most joined by: Ginsburg (9)		Least joined by: Thomas (4)

Type	Case	Citation	Issues	Joined by	Other opinions
	Howsam v. Dean Witter Reynolds, Inc.	537 U.S. 79 (2002)		Rehnquist, Stevens, Scalia, Kennedy, Souter, Ginsburg	
	Eldred v. Ashcroft	537 U.S. 186 (2003)			
	United States v. Jimenez Recio	537 U.S. 270 (2003)		Rehnquist, O'Connor, Scalia, Kennedy, Souter, Thomas, Ginsburg	
	Meyer v. Holley	537 U.S. 280 (2003)		Unanimous	
	FCC v. NextWave Personal Communications, Inc.	537 U.S. 293 (2003)			
	Foster v. Florida	537 U.S. 990 (2003)			
Breyer dissented from the Court's denial of certiorari.
	Ewing v. California	538 U.S. 11 (2003)		Stevens, Souter, Ginsburg	
	Norfolk & Western R. Co. v. Ayers	538 U.S. 135 (2003)			
	Archer v. Warner	538 U.S. 314 (2003)		Rehnquist, O'Connor, Scalia, Kennedy, Souter, Ginsburg	
	Dole Food Co. v. Patrickson	538 U.S. 468 (2003)		O'Connor	
	Demore v. Kim	538 U.S. 510 (2003)			
	Pharmaceutical Research and Mfrs. of America v. Walsh	538 U.S. 644 (2003)			
	National Park Hospitality Assn. v. Department of Interior	538 U.S. 803 (2003)		O'Connor	
	Fitzgerald v. Racing Association of Central Iowa	539 U.S. 103 (2003)		Unanimous	
	Sell v. United States	539 U.S. 166 (2003)		Rehnquist, Stevens, Kennedy, Souter, Ginsburg	
	United States v. American Library Association, Inc.	539 U.S. 194 (2003)			
	Gratz v. Bollinger	539 U.S. 244 (2003)			
	Green Tree Financial Corp. v. Bazzle	539 U.S. 444 (2003)		Scalia, Thomas, Ginsburg	
	Stogner v. California	539 U.S. 607 (2003)		Stevens, O'Connor, Souter, Ginsburg	
	Nike, Inc. v. Klasky	539 U.S. 654 (2003)		O'Connor	
Breyer dissented from the Court's dismissal of certiorari as improvidently granted.
