= 2002 term United States Supreme Court opinions of Sandra Day O'Connor =

The 2002 term of the Supreme Court of the United States began October 7, 2002, and concluded October 5, 2003. This was the twenty-second term of Associate Justice Sandra Day O'Connor's tenure on the Court.
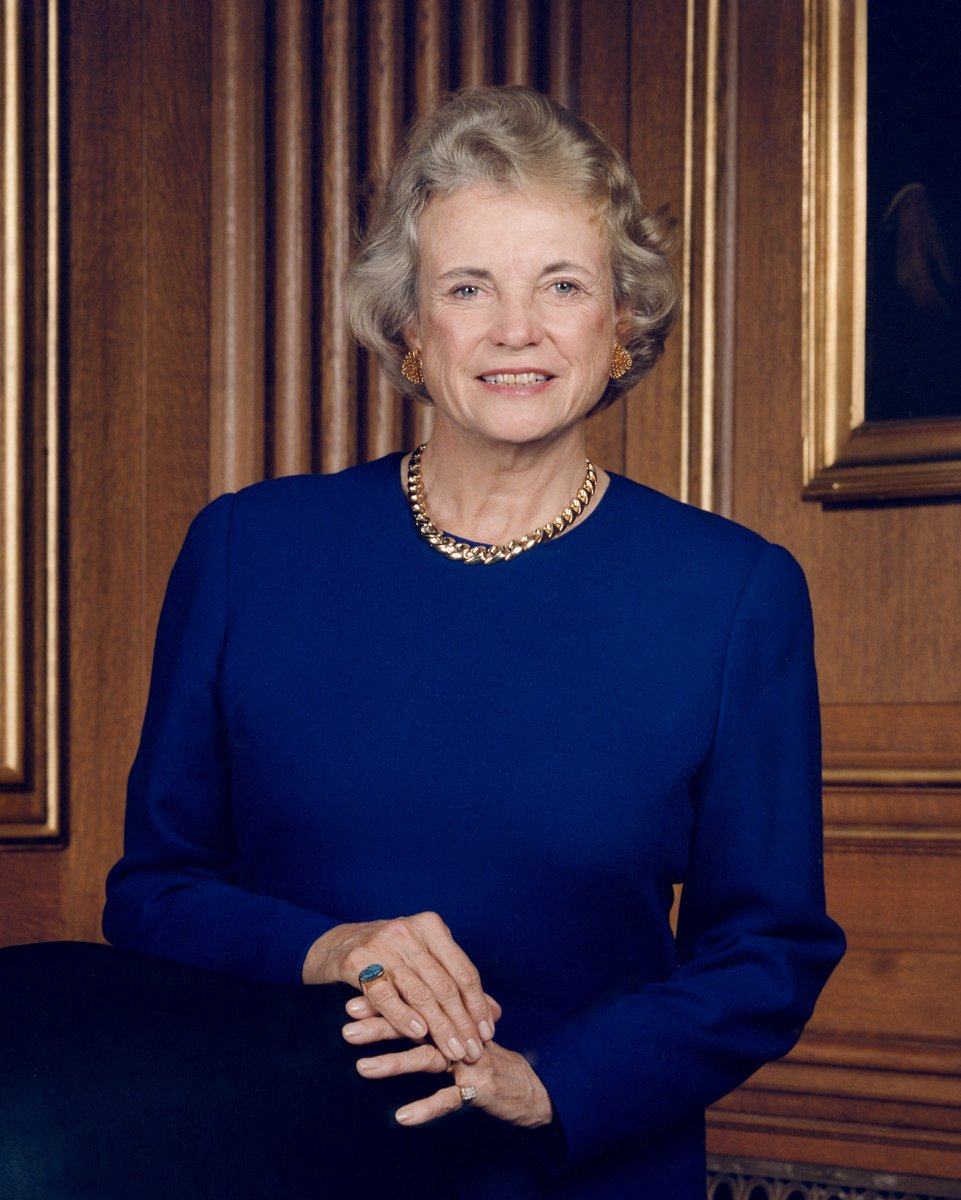

Sandra Day O'Connor 2002 term statistics

| 9 | Majority or plurality | 6 | Concurrence | 0 | Other |
| 0 | Dissent | 2 | Concurrence/dissent | Total = | 17 |
| Bench opinions = 17 | | Opinions relating to orders = 0 | | In-chambers opinions = 0 |
| Unanimous opinions: 2 | | Most joined by: Rehnquist (9) | | Least joined by: Stevens, Souter, Ginsburg (5) |

| Type | Case | Citation | Issues | Joined by | Other opinions |
|---|---|---|---|---|---|
| | Yellow Transportation, Inc. v. Michigan | 537 U.S. 36 (2002) | | Rehnquist, Scalia, Kennedy, Souter, Thomas, Ginsburg, Breyer | |
| | Sattazahn v. Pennsylvania | 537 U.S. 101 (2003) | | | |
| | Ewing v. California | 538 U.S. 11 (2003) | | Rehnquist, Kennedy | |
| | Lockyer v. Andrade | 538 U.S. 63 (2003) | | Rehnquist, Scalia, Kennedy, Thomas | |
| | Cuyahoga Falls v. Buckeye Community Hope Foundation | 538 U.S. 188 (2003) | | Unanimous | |
| | Woodford v. Garceau | 538 U.S. 202 (2003) | | | |
| | Branch v. Smith | 538 U.S. 254 (2003) | | Thomas (in part) | |
| | Virginia v. Black | 538 U.S. 343 (2003) | | Rehnquist, Stevens, Breyer; Scalia (in part) | |
| | Franchise Tax Bd. of Cal. v. Hyatt | 538 U.S. 488 (2003) | | Unanimous | |
| | Demore v. Kim | 538 U.S. 510 (2003) | | Scalia, Thomas | |
| | Pharmaceutical Research and Mfrs. of America v. Walsh | 538 U.S. 644 (2003) | | Rehnquist, Kennedy | |
| | Desert Palace, Inc. v. Costa | 539 U.S. 90 (2003) | | | |
| | Gratz v. Bollinger | 539 U.S. 244 (2003) | | Breyer (in part) | |
| | Grutter v. Bollinger | 539 U.S. 306 (2003) | | Stevens, Souter, Ginsburg, Breyer; Scalia, Thomas (in part) | |
| | Georgia v. Ashcroft | 539 U.S. 461 (2003) | | Rehnquist, Scalia, Kennedy, Thomas | |
| | Wiggins v. Smith | 539 U.S. 510 (2003) | | Rehnquist, Stevens, Kennedy, Souter, Ginsburg, Breyer | |
| | Lawrence v. Texas | 539 U.S. 558 (2003) | | | |
