= List of United States Supreme Court cases, volume 538 =

This is a list of all United States Supreme Court cases from volume 538 of the United States Reports:

Case name	Citation	Date decided
Conn. Dept. of Pub. Safety v. Doe	538 U.S. 1	2003
Due process does not require the opportunity to prove a fact that is not material to a state's statutory scheme. Mere injury to reputation, even if defamatory, does not constitute the deprivation of a liberty interest.
Ewing v. California	538 U.S. 11	2003
Lockyer v. Andrade	538 U.S. 63	2003
Smith v. Doe	538 U.S. 84	2003
Cook Cnty. v. United States ex rel. Chandler	538 U.S. 119	2003
Local governments are "persons" amenable to qui tam actions under the False Claims Act.
Norfolk & W. R.R. Co. v. Ayers	538 U.S. 135	2003
Mental anguish damages resulting from the fear of developing cancer may be recovered under the FELA by a railroad worker suffering from the actionable injury asbestosis caused by work-related exposure to asbestos.
Cuyahoga Falls v. Buckeye Community Hope Foundation	538 U.S. 188	2003
Woodford v. Garceau	538 U.S. 202	2003
For purposes of applying the rule of Lindh v. Murphy, a case does not become "pending" until an actual application for habeas relief is filed in federal court. A habeas application filed until after AEDPA's effective date is subject to AEDPA's amendments.
Brown v. Legal Foundation	538 U.S. 216	2003
A state law requiring that client funds that could not otherwise generate net earnings for the client be deposited in an IOLTA account is not a regulatory taking, but a law requiring that the interest on those funds be transferred to a different owner for a legitimate public use could be a per se taking requiring the payment of just compensation to the client.
Branch v. Smith	538 U.S. 254	2003
Archer v. Warner	538 U.S. 314	2003
A debt for money promised in a settlement agreement accompanied by the release of underlying tort claims can amount to a debt for money obtained by fraud, within the terms of the Bankruptcy Code's nondischargeability statute.
Ky. Ass'n of Health Plans, Inc. v. Miller	538 U.S. 329	2003
Virginia v. Black	538 U.S. 343	2003
PacifiCare Health Systems, Inc. v. Book	538 U.S. 401	2003
State Farm Mut. Automobile Ins. Co. v. Campbell	538 U.S. 408	2003
Clackamas Gastroenterology Associates, P.C. v. Wells	538 U.S. 440	2003
Jinks v. Richland Cnty.	538 U.S. 456	2003
Dole Food Co. v. Patrickson	538 U.S. 468	2003
Franchise Tax Board v. Hyatt	538 U.S. 488	2003
Massaro v. United States	538 U.S. 500	2003
An ineffective-assistance-of-counsel claim may be brought in a collateral proceeding under § 2255, whether or not the petitioner could have raised the claim on direct appeal.
Demore v. Kim	538 U.S. 510	2003
Roell v. Withrow	538 U.S. 580	2003
Consent to a magistrate judge's hearing of a case can be inferred from a party's conduct during litigation, such as by appearing before the magistrate after being informed of the right to appear before a federal judge.
Illinois ex rel. Madigan v. Telemarketing Associates, Inc.	538 U.S. 600	2003
States may maintain fraud actions when fundraisers make false or misleading representations designed to deceive donors about how their donations will be used.
Kaupp v. Texas	538 U.S. 626	2003
Price v. Vincent	538 U.S. 634	2003
Pharmaceutical Research and Mfrs. v. Walsh	538 U.S. 644	2003
Breuer v. Jim's Concrete of Brevard, Inc.	538 U.S. 691	2003
Section 216(b) of the Fair Labor Standards Act does not bar removal of a suit from state to federal court.
Inyo Cnty. v. Paiute-Shoshone Indians	538 U.S. 701	2003
City of Los Angeles v. David	538 U.S. 715	2003
Kansas v. Nebraska	538 U.S. 720	2003
Nev. Dept. of Human Resources v. Hibbs	538 U.S. 721	2003
Chavez v. Martinez	538 U.S. 760	2003
Nat'l Park Hospitality Assn. v. Dept. of Interior	538 U.S. 803	2003
Black & Decker Disability Plan v. Nord	538 U.S. 822	2003
ERISA does not require plan administrators to accord special deference to the opinions of treating physicians.
Bunkley v. Florida	538 U.S. 835	2003
