= Norfolk & Western Railway Co. v. Ayers =

- Supreme Court of the United States

Decided March 10, 2003
- Full case name: Norfolk & Western Railway Co. v. Ayers
- Citations: 538 U.S. 135 (more)

Holding
- Mental anguish damages resulting from the fear of developing cancer may be recovered under FELA by a railroad worker suffering from the actionable injury asbestosis caused by work-related exposure to asbestos.

Court membership
- Chief Justice William Rehnquist Associate Justices John P. Stevens · Sandra Day O'Connor; Antonin Scalia · Anthony Kennedy; David Souter · Clarence Thomas; Ruth Bader Ginsburg · Stephen Breyer

Case opinions
- Majority: GINSBURG, joined by unanimous (Parts I, II, IV); STEVENS, SCALIA, SOUTER, THOMAS (Part III)
- Concur/dissent: KENNEDY, joined by REHNQUIST, O'CONNOR, BREYER
- Concur/dissent: BREYER

Laws applied
- Federal Employers' Liability Act

Norfolk & Western Railway Co. v. Ayers, 538 U.S. 135 (2003), was a United States Supreme Court case in which the court held that mental anguish damages resulting from the fear of developing cancer may be recovered under the Federal Employers' Liability Act by a railroad worker suffering from the actionable injury asbestosis caused by work-related exposure to asbestos.

== Background ==
Section 1 of FELA provides: "Every common carrier by railroad while engaging in [interstate commerce], shall be liable in damages to any person suffering injury while he is employed by such carrier in such commerce... for such injury... resulting in whole or in part from the [carrier's] negligence."

Alleging that Norfolk & Western Railway Company (Norfolk) had negligently exposed them to asbestos and thereby caused them to contract the occupational disease asbestosis, six former Norfolk employees (collectively, Ayers), brought suit in a West Virginia state court under the Federal Employers' Liability Act (FELA). As an element of their damages, Ayers sought recovery for mental anguish based on their fear of developing cancer.

The trial court instructed the jury that a plaintiff who demonstrated a reasonable fear of cancer related to proven physical injury from asbestos was entitled to compensation for that fear as a part of the damages awardable for pain and suffering. The court also instructed the jury not to reduce recoveries because of nonrailroad exposures to asbestos, so long as the jury found that Norfolk was negligent and that dust exposures at Norfolk contributed, however slightly, to each plaintiff's injuries. The court rejected Norfolk's proposed instructions, which would have (1) ruled out damages for fear of cancer unless the claimant proved both an actual likelihood of developing cancer and physical manifestations of the alleged fear, and (2) required the jury to apportion damages between Norfolk and other employers alleged to have contributed to an asbestosis claimant's disease. The jury returned damages awards for each claimant. The Supreme Court of Appeals of West Virginia denied discretionary review.

The Supreme Court granted certiorari.

== Opinion of the court ==
The Supreme Court issued an opinion on March 10, 2003.

== Later developments ==
In Ayers and other cases, such as Amchem Products, Inc. v. Windsor and Ortiz v. Fibreboard Corp., the Supreme Court called on Congress to reform the litigation process for workplace asbestosis. Senator Orrin Hatch attempted to pass the Fairness in Asbestos Injury Resolution Act in 2003, but it did not become law.
