= List of United States Supreme Court cases, volume 539 =

This is a list of all the United States Supreme Court cases from volume 539 of the United States Reports:

Case name	Citation	Date decided
Beneficial Nat'l Bank v. Anderson	539 U.S. 1	2003
Dastar Corp. v. Twentieth Century Fox Film Corp.	539 U.S. 23	2003
Entergy Louisiana, Inc. v. Louisiana Public Service Commission	539 U.S. 39	2003
Citizens Bank v. Alafabco, Inc.	539 U.S. 52	2003
Hillside Dairy Inc. v. Lyons	539 U.S. 59	2003
Nguyen v. United States	539 U.S. 69	2003
Desert Palace, Inc. v. Costa	539 U.S. 90	2003
Fitzgerald v. Racing Ass'n	539 U.S. 103	2003
Dow Chem. Co. v. Stephenson	539 U.S. 111	2003
Judgment vacated with respect to the Isaacson respondents and remanded for further consideration in light of Syngenta Crop Protection, Inc. v. Henson. Judgment affirmed by an equally divided Court with respect to the Stephenson respondents. Stevens did not participate.
Virginia v. Hicks	539 U.S. 113	2003
Overton v. Bazzetta	539 U.S. 126	2003
FEC v. Beaumont	539 U.S. 146	2003
Sell v. United States	539 U.S. 166	2003
United States v. American Library Ass'n	539 U.S. 194	2003
Gratz v. Bollinger	539 U.S. 244	2003
Grutter v. Bollinger	539 U.S. 306	2003
Am. Ins. Ass'n v. Garamendi	539 U.S. 396	2003
Green Tree Fin. Corp. v. Bazzle	539 U.S. 444	2003
Georgia v. Ashcroft	539 U.S. 461	2003
Wiggins v. Smith	539 U.S. 510	2003
Lawrence v. Texas	539 U.S. 558	2003
Stogner v. California	539 U.S. 607	2003
Nike, Inc. v. Kasky	539 U.S. 654	2003
