= Inyo County v. Paiute-Shoshone Indians of the Bishop Community =

- Supreme Court of the United States

Argued March 31, 2003 Decided May 19, 2003
- Full case name: Inyo County, California, et al. v. Paiute-Shoshone Indians of the Bishop Community of the Bishop Colony, et al.
- Citations: 538 U.S. 701 (more) 123 S. Ct. 1887; 155 L. Ed. 2d 933

Case history
- Prior: 291 F.3d 549 (9th Cir. 2002)

Court membership
- Chief Justice William Rehnquist Associate Justices John P. Stevens · Sandra Day O'Connor; Antonin Scalia · Anthony Kennedy; David Souter · Clarence Thomas; Ruth Bader Ginsburg · Stephen Breyer

Case opinions
- Majority: Ginsburg, joined by Rehnquist, O'Connor, Scalia, Kennedy, Souter, Thomas, Breyer
- Concurrence: Stevens

Laws applied
- 42 U.S.C. § 1983

Inyo County v. Paiute-Shoshone Indians of the Bishop Community, 538 U.S. 701 (2003), was a United States Supreme Court case.

== Background ==
The Bishop Paiute Tribe of California owns and operates the Paiute Palace Casino. The Inyo County District attorney had three casino employees under suspicion of welfare fraud, and asked the casino for their employment records. The casino declined, stating that it was against their privacy policy. Upon finding probable cause, the district attorney obtained a search warrant, authorizing the search of employment records of those three casino employees. Subsequently, the district attorney asked for the records of six more employees. The tribe once again reiterated their privacy policy, but offered up for evidence the last page of each employee's welfare application. The district attorney refused the offer. To ward off additional searches, the tribe filed a suit against the district attorney and the county. They stated that their tribe's status as a sovereign made them immune to state processes under federal law and asserted that the state authorized the seizure of tribal records.

The California district court dismissed the tribe's complaint, holding that the tribal sovereign immunity does not preclude the search and seizure of personnel records. In 2002, the decision was reversed, with the Ninth Circuit holding that the executing of a search warrant against the Paiute-Shoshone tribe interfered with their right to make their own laws, and be governed by them.

== Decision ==
In a unanimous decision, the court vacated the decision of the Ninth Circuit. The court found that 42 U.S.C. § 1983 was only meant to protect private rights, not sovereign rights. And since the case rested entirely on the basis that the tribe's sovereign immunity was violated by the search warrant being issued, the tribe could not sue under section §1983.

== See also ==
- Paiute-Shoshone Indians of the Bishop Community of the Bishop Colony
- Cherokee Nation v. Georgia
- Worcester v. Georgia
