= American Insurance Ass'n v. Garamendi =

American Insurance Association v. Garamendi
- Supreme Court of the United States

Argued April 23, 2003 Decided June 23, 2003
- Full case name: American Insurance Association v. Garamendi
- Citations: 539 U.S. 396 (more) 123 S. Ct. 2374; 156 L. Ed. 2d 376; 2003 U.S. LEXIS 4797

Case history
- Prior: Motion for summary judgment denied, 186 F. Supp. 2d 1099 (E.D. Cal. 2001), aff'd, 296 F.3d 832 (9th Cir. 2002); cert. granted, 537 U.S. 1100 (2003).
- Subsequent: Rehearing denied, 539 U.S. 982 (2003).

Holding
- A state statute requiring insurance companies to go public with some of their records in foreign countries in order to "facilitate Holocaust-era insurance claims" by the state's residents is unconstitutional because it interferes with the federal government's sovereignty over foreign affairs.

Court membership
- Chief Justice William Rehnquist Associate Justices John P. Stevens · Sandra Day O'Connor; Antonin Scalia · Anthony Kennedy; David Souter · Clarence Thomas; Ruth Bader Ginsburg · Stephen Breyer

Case opinions
- Majority: Souter, joined by Rehnquist, O'Connor, Kennedy, Breyer
- Dissent: Ginsburg, joined by Stevens, Scalia, Thomas

Laws applied
- U.S. Const. art. I Cal. Ins. Code Ann. §§13800-13807 (Holocaust Victim Insurance Relief Act of 1999)

American Insurance Association v. Garamendi, 539 U.S. 396 (2003), was a case in which the Supreme Court of the United States invalidated a California law that required any insurance company wishing to do business in the state to publish information regarding insurance policies held by persons in Europe from 1920 through 1945.

== Background ==
The Holocaust Victim Insurance Relief Act (HVIRA) was enacted in 1999 by the California State Legislature in "an attempt to facilitate Holocaust-era insurance claims by California residents." The law required that insurance companies in California that sold policies to people in Europe between 1920 and 1945 to go public with the records of their work during that time, "including the names of policy owners and the status of the policies." American Insurance, along with several other insurance companies and trade associations filed suit claiming that the Act exceeded the powers of the State of California since it is the federal government that has the power to regulate commerce and foreign affairs. The District Court ruled in favor of the plaintiffs, however the 9th Circuit Court of Appeals reversed the decision.

== Question before the Supreme Court ==
Does the HVIRA "interfere with the federal government's sovereignty over foreign affairs established by Article 1 of the Constitution?"

== Decision of the Court ==
In a 5–4 decision in favor of American Insurance Association, Justice Souter wrote the majority opinion for the Supreme Court. The Court held that California's HVIRA "interfere with the president's ability to conduct the nation's foreign policy and is therefore preempted."

== See also ==
- Zschernig v. Miller: Oregon law with foreign policy implications
