= Wiggins v. Smith =

- Supreme Court of the United States

Argued March 24, 2003 Decided June 26, 2003
- Full case name: Kevin Wiggins, Petitioner v. Sewall Smith, Warden, et al.
- Citations: 539 U.S. 510 (more) 123 S. Ct. 2527; 156 L. Ed. 2d 471; 2003 U.S. LEXIS 5014
- Argument: Oral argument

Case history
- Prior: Petition for writ of habeas corpus granted, Wiggins v. Corcoran, 164 F. Supp. 2d 538 (D. Md. 2001); reversed, 288 F.3d 629 (4th Cir. 2002); cert. granted, 537 U.S. 1027 (2002).

Holding
- The performance of Wiggins' attorneys at sentencing violated his Sixth Amendment right to effective assistance of counsel.

Court membership
- Chief Justice William Rehnquist Associate Justices John P. Stevens · Sandra Day O'Connor; Antonin Scalia · Anthony Kennedy; David Souter · Clarence Thomas; Ruth Bader Ginsburg · Stephen Breyer

Case opinions
- Majority: O'Connor, joined by Rehnquist, Stevens, Kennedy, Souter, Ginsburg, Breyer
- Dissent: Scalia, joined by Thomas

Wiggins v. Smith, 539 U.S. 510 (2003), is a case in which the United States Supreme Court spelled out standards for "effectiveness" in the constitutional right to legal counsel guaranteed by the Sixth Amendment. Previously the court had determined that the Sixth Amendment included the right to "effective assistance" of legal counsel, but it did not specify what constitutes "effective", thus leaving the standards for effectiveness vague. In Wiggins v. Smith, the court set forth the American Bar Association Guidelines for the Appointment and Performance of Defense Counsel in Death Penalty Cases Guideline 11.8.6.(1989), as a specific guideline by which to measure effectiveness and competence of legal counsel.

In Strickland v. Washington, the Supreme Court set forth the factors the defendant must establish to demonstrate that counsel was ineffective. First, it must be shown that counsel's performance fell below an objective standard of reasonable competence, and second, if counsel had not been competent, that the trial outcome would likely have been different had the counsel been competent.

== Background ==
On September 17, 1988, a woman was found dead in her bathtub, with signs of sexual assault and her apartment ransacked. Defendant Wiggins had been painting at her apartment building and was seen conversing with her on September 15. That same evening he went shopping with the victim's credit cards and took some of her jewelry to a pawnbroker. Four days later, Wiggins was arrested while driving the victim's car.

Wiggins was found guilty of capital murder after a bench trial. After the trial, Wiggins elected to have a jury decide the sentence on the murder conviction. Counsel's investigation of Wiggins' background was rudimentary and contained only a superficial knowledge of his history from a few sources, omitting the information in detailed social service reports of severe physical and sexual abuse. The record of the sentencing proceedings suggests that counsel's failure to investigate the defendant's background stemmed from inattention, not strategic judgment. Counsel failed to follow the American Bar Association guidelines in not gathering all such information. Counsel said they had been intent on proving the defendant did not kill the victim with his own hand and had not prepared for the sentencing phase. Counsel presented no mitigating evidence to the jury at the sentencing phase. The jury concluded that the defendant was a principal in the first degree murder of the victim and sentenced Wiggins to death.

Wiggins obtained new counsel and sought post conviction relief on the grounds that his trial counsel was ineffective by failing to investigate and present mitigating evidence of his dysfunctional background. He presented expert testimony by a forensic mental health specialist who described his personal history including the severe physical and sexual abuse he had endured and its effect upon him.

At a hearing, one of Wiggins' trial counsels testified that he had Wiggins' social services records before sentencing, and knew that it could be a mitigating factor in a capital case, but believed that the way to avoid the death penalty was to create reasonable doubt that petitioner was a principal in the first degree rather than present the mitigating factors.

The state provided a post-conviction review of his case and the Maryland Court of Appeals upheld the trial court's findings. Wiggins then filed for federal habeas corpus relief. The Federal District Court found that defense counsel did not provide effective assistance at sentencing. However, on appeal, the Fourth Circuit Court of Appeals reversed, finding that defense counsel provided reasonable application of Strickland v. Washington (1984) standards. Upon appeal, the Supreme Court granted Wiggins' petition for certiorari.

== Decision ==
The Supreme Court granted a new sentencing hearing, holding that Wiggins' Sixth Amendment right to effective assistance of counsel was violated. Trial counsel failed to adequately investigate and present mitigating evidence such as Wiggins' personal and social history of severe physical abuse and sexual assault, and none of this information was presented at the penalty phase of trial, thus prejudicing Wiggins' defense. The Supreme Court's decision stated that such an investigation is a key component of the strategic decision regarding what, if any, mitigating evidence to present during a sentencing hearing.

The Court further held that the counsel's decision in defending a client facing the death penalty must be based on a thorough investigation of all possible mitigating factors. Failing that, it must be based on competent professional judgment providing sound reasons for limiting the investigation.

== Significance ==
The Supreme Court attempted to improve on the vague and generalized language in Strickland v. Washington by adding an American Bar Association Guideline 11.8.6. This guideline suggests the content of counsel's investigative efforts should contain "medical history, educational history, employment and training history, family and social history, prior adult and juvenile correctional experience, and religious and cultural influences." This clarification allows for the presentation of psychological analysis without the presence of specific diagnosis.

== See also ==
- Bigby v. Dretke (5th Cir. 2005)
- List of United States Supreme Court cases, volume 539
- List of United States Supreme Court cases
