= Stogner v. California =

- Supreme Court of the United States

Argued March 31, 2003 Decided June 26, 2003
- Full case name: Marion Reynolds Stogner v. California
- Citations: 539 U.S. 607 (more) 123 S. Ct. 2446; 156 L. Ed. 2d 544

Case history
- Prior: Stogner v. Superior Court of Contra Costa County, 93 Cal. App. 4th 1229, 114 Cal. Rptr. 2d 37 (App. 1st Dist. 2001); cert. granted, 537 U.S. 1043 (2002).

Holding
- A law enacted after expiration of a previously applicable limitations period violates the ex post facto clause when it is applied to revive a previously time-barred prosecution.

Court membership
- Chief Justice William Rehnquist Associate Justices John P. Stevens · Sandra Day O'Connor; Antonin Scalia · Anthony Kennedy; David Souter · Clarence Thomas; Ruth Bader Ginsburg · Stephen Breyer

Case opinions
- Majority: Breyer, joined by Stevens, O'Connor, Souter, Ginsburg
- Dissent: Kennedy, joined by Rehnquist, Scalia, Thomas

Laws applied
- U.S. Const. art. I, §§ 9, 10; U.S. Const. amend. XIV

Stogner v. California, 539 U.S. 607 (2003), is a decision by the Supreme Court of the United States, which held that California's retroactive extension of the statute of limitations for sexual offenses committed against minors was an unconstitutional ex post facto law.

== Background ==
In 1994, the California State Legislature enacted a specific statute of limitations (PC Section 803(g) (3)(A)) for child sexual abuse crimes, allowing charges to be filed within one year of the time that the crime was reported to the police. It allowed, when the prior limitations period has expired, criminal prosecution on child molesting charges many years after its occurrence.

In 1998, petitioner Marion Stogner was indicted for acts committed between 1955 and 1973, under California's specific statute of limitations. It occurred after Stogner's two sons were both charged with molestation. During the state's investigation of one of the sons, Stogner's daughters reported that their father sexually abused them for years when they were under the age of 14. The grand jury found probable cause to charge Stogner with molestation of his two daughters.

Stogner claimed that the statute violates the ex post facto law and due process clauses by retroactively invoking laws that were not in place at the time of the alleged offenses. At the time that the crimes were allegedly committed, the statute of limitations was three years. The victims, his two daughters, said that they had not reported sooner because they were in fear of their father. The applicable California law had been revised in 1996, extending the statute of limitations retroactively.

== Trial court and appeals ==
The retroactive implementation of the laws was the focus of Stogner's motion and appeal, claiming that the law violated his rights under the ex post facto clause of the U.S. Constitution, as well as his rights to due process. The trial court initially agreed with Stogner, but the Court of Appeal of California reversed and his motion for dismissal was denied. Stogner appealed on writ of certiorari to the Court of Appeal of California, first appellate district; the Court of Appeal affirmed.

Stogner ultimately appealed to the US Supreme Court.

== Decision ==
The Supreme Court upheld the trial court's ruling that the law was a violation of the ex post facto clause of the constitution by a split 5–4 decision. The Supreme Court held that "a law enacted after expiration of a previously applicable limitations period violates the Ex Post Facto Clause when it is applied to revive a previously time-barred prosecution."

== See also ==
- List of United States Supreme Court cases, volume 539
- List of United States Supreme Court cases
