= Clackamas Gastroenterology Associates, P.C. v. Wells =

- Supreme Court of the United States

Argued February 25, 2003 Decided April 22, 2003
- Full case name: Clackamas Gastroenterology Associates, P.C. v. Wells
- Docket no.: 01-1435
- Citations: 538 U.S. 440 (more)

Court membership
- Chief Justice William Rehnquist Associate Justices John P. Stevens · Sandra Day O'Connor; Antonin Scalia · Anthony Kennedy; David Souter · Clarence Thomas; Ruth Bader Ginsburg · Stephen Breyer

Case opinions
- Majority: Stevens, joined by Rehnquist, O'Connor, Scalia, Kennedy, Souter, Thomas
- Dissent: Ginsburg, joined by Breyer

Laws applied
- Americans with Disabilities Act of 1990

Clackamas Gastroenterology Associates, P.C. v. Wells, 538 U.S. 440 (2003), was a case decided by the Supreme Court of the United States on April 22, 2003. The court held that in deciding whether the physician-shareholders should be considered employees for purposes of coverage under the Americans with Disabilities Act of 1990 (ADA), the common law element of control is the main guidepost.

== Background ==
After working for Clackamas Gastroenterology Associates, P.C. for about ten years, Deborah Wells filed suit against Clackamas Gastroenterology, alleging that the clinic violated the ADA in terminating her employment. Clackamas moved for summary judgment, arguing that the clinic was not covered by the ADA that required 15 or more employees. The main issue was whether the four physician-shareholders who owned the clinic and formed the board of directors should be considered employees. The District Court granted Clackamas' motion, deciding that the four physician-shareholders were more similar to partners in a partnership and thus would not be considered employees. The Court of Appeals for the Ninth Circuit reversed, holding that Clackamas could not avoid liability in such situations by asserting similarity to a partnership, while taking advantage of having a corporate status.

== Decision ==
In a 7-2 opinion delivered by Justice Stevens, the Court held that the common law element of control should be the main guidepost in deciding whether the director-shareholder physicians should be considered employees for the purposes of the ADA. The Court also listed six factors that would be relevant in such consideration. The Court then reversed the Ninth Circuit's judgment and remanded the case.

== See also ==
- List of United States Supreme Court cases, volume 538
- Americans with Disabilities Act of 1990
