= Green Tree Financial Corp. v. Bazzle =

- Supreme Court of the United States

Decided June 23, 2003
- Full case name: Green Tree Financial Corp. v. Bazzle
- Citations: 539 U.S. 444 (more)

Holding
- An arbitrator must determine whether the contracts forbid class arbitration.

Court membership
- Chief Justice William Rehnquist Associate Justices John P. Stevens · Sandra Day O'Connor; Antonin Scalia · Anthony Kennedy; David Souter · Clarence Thomas; Ruth Bader Ginsburg · Stephen Breyer

Case opinions
- Plurality: Breyer, joined by Scalia, Souter, and Ginsburg
- Concur/dissent: Stevens
- Dissent: Rehnquist, joined by O'Connor and Kennedy
- Dissent: Thomas

Green Tree Financial Corp. v. Bazzle, 539 U.S. 444 (2003), was a United States Supreme Court case in which the court held that an arbitrator must determine whether the contracts forbid class arbitration.

== Background ==
Several parties (including some named Bazzle) separately entered into contracts with Green Tree Financial Corp. that were governed by South Carolina law and included an arbitration clause governed by the Federal Arbitration Act. Each party filed a state-court action, complaining that Green Tree's failure to provide them with a form that would have told them of their right to name their own lawyers and insurance agents violated South Carolina law, and seeking damages. The Bazzles moved for class certification, and Green Tree sought to stay the court proceedings and compel arbitration. After the court certified a class and compelled arbitration, Green Tree selected, with the Bazzles' consent, an arbitrator who later awarded the class damages and attorney's fees. The trial court confirmed the award, and Green Tree appealed, claiming, among other things, that class arbitration was legally impermissible. Lackey and the Buggses, other plaintiffs, also sought class certification and Green Tree moved to compel arbitration. The trial court denied Green Tree's motion, finding the agreement unenforceable, but the state appeals court reversed. The parties then chose an arbitrator, the same arbitrator who was later chosen to arbitrate the Bazzles' dispute. The arbitrator certified a class and awarded it damages and attorney's fees. The trial court confirmed the award, and Green Tree appealed. The South Carolina Supreme Court withdrew both cases from the appeals court, assumed jurisdiction, and consolidated the proceedings. That court held that the contracts were silent in respect to class arbitration, that they consequently authorized class arbitration, and that arbitration had properly taken that form.

The Supreme Court granted certiorari.

== Opinion of the court ==
The Supreme Court issued an opinion on June 23, 2003. The decision was a plurality of four plus one concurring in judgment.
