= 2002 term per curiam opinions of the Supreme Court of the United States =

The Supreme Court of the United States handed down twelve per curiam opinions during its 2002 term, which began October 7, 2002 and concluded October 5, 2003.

Because per curiam decisions are issued from the Court as an institution, these opinions all lack the attribution of authorship or joining votes to specific justices. All justices on the Court at the time the decision was handed down are assumed to have participated and concurred unless otherwise noted.

== Court membership ==
Chief Justice: William Rehnquist

Associate Justices: John Paul Stevens, Sandra Day O'Connor, Antonin Scalia, Anthony Kennedy, David Souter, Clarence Thomas, Ruth Bader Ginsburg, Stephen Breyer

== Early v. Packer ==
- Full caption: Richard E. Early, Warden, et al. v. William Packer
- Citations: 537 U.S. 3; 123 S. Ct. 362; 154 L. Ed. 2d 263; 2002 U.S. LEXIS 8314; 71 U.S.L.W. 3312; 2002 Cal. Daily Op. Service 10897; 2002 Daily Journal DAR 12601; 16 Fla. L. Weekly Fed. S 2
- Prior history: Petition denied, sub nom. Packer v. Hill, No. 96-04957, C.D. Cal.; affirmed in part, reversed in part, remanded, 291 F.3d 569 (9th Cir. 2001) (as amended, Feb. 27, 2002); rehearing, rehearing en banc denied, 291 F.3d 569 (9th Cir. 2002)
- Subsequent history: Rehearing denied, 537 U.S. 1148 (2003)
- Full text of the opinion: Findlaw

537 U.S. 3
Decided November 4, 2002.
Ninth Circuit reversed.

== INS v. Ventura ==
- Full caption: Immigration and Naturalization Service v. Fredy Orlando Ventura
- Citations: 537 U.S. 12; 123 S. Ct. 353; 154 L. Ed. 2d 272; 2002 U.S. LEXIS 8313; 71 U.S.L.W. 3314; 2002 Cal. Daily Op. Service 10898; 2002 Daily Journal DAR 12603; 16 Fla. L. Weekly Fed. S 1
- Prior history: Petition for asylum denied, appeal denied, No. A72-688-860, Board of Immigration Appeals; review granted, remanded, 264 F.3d 1150 (9th Cir. 2001)
- Subsequent history: On remand, remitted, 317 F.3d 1003 (9th Cir. 2003)
- Full text of the opinion: Findlaw

537 U.S. 12
Decided November 4, 2002.
Ninth Circuit reversed and remanded.

== Woodford v. Visciotti ==
- Full caption: Jeanne Woodford, Warden v. John Louis Visciotti
- Citations: 537 U.S. 19; 123 S. Ct. 357; 154 L. Ed. 2d 279; 2002 U.S. LEXIS 8312; 71 U.S.L.W. 3315; 2002 Cal. Daily Op. Service 10900; 2002 Daily Journal DAR 12605; 16 Fla. L. Weekly Fed. S 6
- Prior history: Writ of habeas corpus granted in part, denied in part, No. CV 97-04591, C.D. Cal.; affirmed, 288 F.3d 1097 (9th Cir. 2002)
- Subsequent history: Cert. denied, 537 U.S. 1004 (2002)
- Full text of the opinion: Findlaw

537 U.S. 19
Decided November 4, 2002.
Ninth Circuit reversed.

== Abdur'Rahman v. Bell ==
- Full caption: Abu-Ali Abdur'Rahman v. Ricky Bell, Warden
- Citations: 537 U.S. 88; 123 S. Ct. 594; 154 L. Ed. 2d 501; 2002 U.S. LEXIS 9240; 71 U.S.L.W. 4022; 2002 Day 13901; 2002 Cal. Daily Op. Service 11850; 2002 Daily Journal DAR 13901; 16 Fla. L. Weekly Fed. S 22
- Prior history: Stay of execution granted, 927 F. Supp. 262; summary judgment denied, 990 F. Supp. 985 (M.D. Tenn. 1998); writ of habeas corpus granted, remanded, 999 F. Supp. 1073 (M.D. Tenn. 1998); affirmed in part, reversed in part, remanded, 226 F.3d 696 (6th Cir. 2000); rehearing, rehearing en banc denied, No. 98-6568, 2000 U.S. App. LEXIS 34098 (6th Cir. Dec. 22, 2000); cert. denied, 534 U.S. 970 (2001); rehearing, rehearing en banc denied, No. 98-6568, 2002 U.S. App. LEXIS 2520 (6th Cir. Feb. 11, 2002); stay of execution granted, 535 U.S. 981 (2002); cert. granted, 535 U.S. 1016 (2002)
- Subsequent history: Rehearing denied, 537 U.S. 1227 (2003)
- Full text of the opinion: Findlaw

537 U.S. 88
Argued November 6, 2002.
Decided December 10, 2002.
The Court dismissed the writ of certiorari as improvidently granted.

Stevens filed a dissent.

== Kaupp v. Texas ==
- Full caption: Robert Kaupp v. Texas
- Citations: 538 U.S. 626; 123 S. Ct. 1843; 155 L. Ed. 2d 814; 2003 U.S. LEXIS 3670; 71 U.S.L.W. 3696; 2003 Daily Journal DAR 4865; 16 Fla. L. Weekly Fed. S 263
- Prior history: Defendant convicted, Harris County District Court; affirmed, No. 14-00-00128, 2001 Tex. App. LEXIS 3732 (Tex. App. June 7, 2001); review denied, Tex. Crim. App., Apr. 17, 2002
- Subsequent history: On remand, remanded, No. 14-00-00128, 2004 Tex. App. LEXIS 718 (Tex. App. Jan. 27, 2004)
- Full text of the opinion: Findlaw

538 U.S. 626
Decided May 5, 2003.
Court of Appeals of Texas, Fourteenth District, vacated and remanded.

== Los Angeles v. David ==
- Full caption: City of Los Angeles v. Edwin F. David
- Citations: 538 U.S. 715; 123 S. Ct. 1895; 155 L. Ed. 2d 946; 2003 U.S. LEXIS 4059; 71 U.S.L.W. 3720; 2003 Cal. Daily Op. Service 4203; 2003 Daily Journal DAR 5289; 16 Fla. L. Weekly Fed. S 283
- Prior history: Judgment for defendant, No. 99-05602, C.D. Cal.; affirmed in part, reversed in part, remanded, 307 F.3d 1143 (9th Cir. 2002)
- Subsequent history: On remand, affirmed, 335 F.3d 857 (9th Cir. 2003)
- Full text of the opinion: Findlaw

538 U.S. 715
Decided May 19, 2003.
Ninth Circuit reversed.

== Bunkley v. Florida ==
- Full caption: Clyde Timothy Bunkley v. Florida
- Citations: 538 U.S. 835; 123 S. Ct. 2020; 155 L. Ed. 2d 1046; 2003 U.S. LEXIS 4273; 71 U.S.L.W. 3732; 2003 Cal. Daily Op. Service 4373; 2003 Daily Journal DAR 5590; 16 Fla. L. Weekly Fed. S 317
- Prior history: Motion for post-conviction relief denied, Sarasota County Circuit Court; affirmed, 768 So. 2d 510 (Fla. App. 2000); approved, certified question answered in negative, 833 So. 2d 739 (Fla. 2002)
- Subsequent history: On remand, affirmed, 882 So. 2d 890 (Fla. 2004); rehearing denied, No. 01-297, 2004 Fla. LEXIS 1533 (Fla. Sept. 15, 2004); cert. denied, 543 U.S. 1079 (2005)
- Full text of the opinion: Findlaw

538 U.S. 835
Decided May 27, 2003.
Supreme Court of Florida vacated and remanded.

== Citizens Bank v. Alafabco, Inc. ==
- Full caption: The Citizens Bank v. Alafabco, Inc., et al.
- Citations: 539 U.S. 52; 123 S. Ct. 2037; 156 L. Ed. 2d 46; 2003 U.S. LEXIS 4418; 71 U.S.L.W. 3748; 10 A.L.R. Fed. 2d 837; 2003 Cal. Daily Op. Service 4560; 2003 Daily Journal DAR 5807; 16 Fla. L. Weekly Fed. S 324
- Prior history: Motion to compel arbitration granted, No. 00-261, Lawrence Circuit Court; reversed and remanded, 872 So. 2d 798 (Ala. 2002); rehearing denied, No. 1010703, 2002 Ala. LEXIS 392 (Ala. Nov. 27, 2002)
- Subsequent history: On remand, affirmed, 872 So. 2d 809 (Ala. 2003)
- Full text of the opinion: Findlaw

539 U.S. 52
Decided June 2, 2003.
Supreme Court of Alabama reversed and remanded.

== Nike, Inc. v. Kasky ==
- Full caption: Marc Kasky v. Nike, Inc., et al.
- Citations: 539 U.S. 654; 123 S. Ct. 2554; 156 L. Ed. 2d 580; 2003 U.S. LEXIS 5015; 71 U.S.L.W. 4602; 67 U.S.P.Q.2D (BNA) 1001; 31 Media L. Rep. 1865; 2003 Cal. Daily Op. Service 5569; 2003 Daily Journal DAR 7028; 16 Fla. L. Weekly Fed. S 470
- Prior history: Judgment for defendants, No. 994446, San Francisco Superior Court; affirmed, 93 Cal. Rptr. 2d 854 (Cal. App. 2000); reversed and remanded, 45 P.3d 243 (Cal. 2002); rehearing denied, No. S087859, 2002 Cal. LEXIS 5250 (Cal. July 31, 2002); cert. granted, 537 U.S. 1099 (2003)
- Full text of the opinion: Findlaw

539 U.S. 654
Argued April 23, 2003.
Decided June 26, 2003.
The Court dismissed the writ of certiorari as improvidently granted.

Stevens filed a concurrence, joined by Ginsburg in full, and by Souter as to Part III. Kennedy filed a dissent. Breyer filed a dissent, joined by O'Connor.

== See also ==
- List of United States Supreme Court cases, volume 537
- List of United States Supreme Court cases, volume 538
- List of United States Supreme Court cases, volume 539
