= Georgia v. Ashcroft =

2003 US Supreme Court gerrymandering case

- Supreme Court of the United States

Argued April 29, 2003 Decided June 26, 2003
- Full case name: Georgia, Appellant v. John Ashcroft, Attorney General, et al.
- Citations: 539 U.S. 461 (more) 123 S. Ct. 2498; 156 L. Ed. 2d 428; 2003 U.S. LEXIS 5012; 71 U.S.L.W. 4545; 2003 Cal. Daily Op. Service 5549; 2003 Daily Journal DAR 7001; 16 Fla. L. Weekly Fed. S 448

Case history
- Prior: On appeal from the United States District Court for the District of Columbia, 195 F. Supp. 2d 25 (D.D.C. 2002)

Holding
- Georgia did not violate the Voting Rights Act of 1965 in its redistricting.

Court membership
- Chief Justice William Rehnquist Associate Justices John P. Stevens · Sandra Day O'Connor; Antonin Scalia · Anthony Kennedy; David Souter · Clarence Thomas; Ruth Bader Ginsburg · Stephen Breyer

Case opinions
- Majority: O'Connor, joined by Rehnquist, Scalia, Kennedy, Thomas
- Concurrence: Kennedy
- Concurrence: Thomas
- Dissent: Souter, joined by Stevens, Ginsburg, Breyer

Laws applied
- Voting Rights Act of 1965

Georgia v. Ashcroft, 539 U.S. 461 (2003), is a United States Supreme Court case in which the Court found that a three-judge federal district court panel did not consider all of the requisite relevant factors when it examined whether the 2001 Georgia State Senate redistricting plan resulted in retrogression of black voters’ effective exercise of the electoral franchise in contravention of Section 5 of the Voting Rights Act. Section 5, which only applies to those states or political subdivisions that are considered “covered” under Section 4(b) of the VRA, requires that before any change in voting procedure can take effect, it must be precleared by the federal government by a demonstration that the change would not "lead to a retrogression in the position of racial minorities with respect to their effective exercise of the electoral franchise.” The Court held that the district court analysis was incorrect “because it focused too heavily on the ability of the minority group to elect a candidate of its choice in the [safe] districts,” without giving proper consideration to other factors such as the state's creation of additional influence and coalition districts. Accordingly, the Supreme Court vacated and remanded the case to the district court to examine the facts using the new standard announced in its opinion.

== Background ==
§5 of the Voting Rights Act requires that, for covered jurisdictions (which in this case included Georgia), any change in a voting "standard, practice, or procedure" must receive federal preclearance in order to ensure that the change "does not have the purpose and will not have the effect of denying or abridging the right to vote on account of race or color." For such purposes, the United States Supreme Court has generally held that the determination whether such a change should be precleared depends on whether the change would lead to a "retrogression" in the position of racial minorities with respect to their effective exercise of the electoral franchise.

Georgia adopted a new state voter redistricting plan after the 2000 census. The plan "unpacked" the most heavily concentrated majority-minority districts in the benchmark plan, and created a number of new influence districts. After the 1990 census, there were some redistricting disputes involving Georgia's United States House of Representatives seats and the seats in the two houses of the state's legislature. Eventually, among other dispositions, the state's 1997 plan for redistricting the state's senate was precleared. After the 2000 census, there were again redistricting disputes. In 2001, the state enacted a new redistricting plan for the state's senate.

Subsequently, the state

(1) filed a preclearance suit in the District Court for the District of Columbia; and
(2) sought a declaratory judgment that several redistricting plans, including the 2001 state-senate plan, did not violate § 5.

The United States, through its Attorney General, opposed preclearance of the 2001 plan and argued that the plan's changes to three state-senate districts—in each of which the plan assertedly reduced the percentage of black voting-age population to just over 50 percent—unlawfully reduced the ability of black voters to elect candidates of their choice.

Eventually, the District Court, in pertinent part, denied § 5 preclearance for the 2001 plan, as the court expressed the view that

(1) the three districts in question were retrogressive, for in each of those districts, a lesser opportunity existed for a black candidate of choice to win election under the new plan than under the benchmark 1997 plan; and
(2) Georgia had "failed to present any . . . evidence" that the retrogression in those three districts would be offset by gains in other districts (195 F Supp 2d 25).

== Opinion of the Court ==
The Supreme Court vacated and remanded. Justice Sandra Day O'Connor wrote for a 5-4 court.

As an initial matter, the Supreme Court found that the private intervenors were properly allowed to intervene pursuant to Fed. R. Civ. P. 24.

The Court held, however, that the district court failed to consider all the factors relevant to § 5 preclearance when it examined whether the 2001 state-senate redistricting plan resulted in a retrogression of black voters' effective exercise of the electoral franchise.

- First, while the district court acknowledged the importance of assessing the statewide plan as a whole,

(a) it focused too narrowly on three proposed districts;
(b) it gave inadequate consideration to the resulting increases in the percentages of black voting-age population in many other districts, which would likely offset any marginal decreases in the first three districts;
(c) it ignored the evidence of such other districts, as well as other evidence that the state had decided that a way to increase black voting strength was to adopt a plan that "unpacked" the high concentration of minority voters in a few majority-minority districts.

- Second, the District Court did not explore in any meaningful depth any other factor beyond the comparative ability of black voters in the majority-minority districts to elect a candidate of their choice. In doing so, it paid inadequate attention to

(a) the support of legislators representing the benchmark majority-minority districts and
(b) the maintenance of the legislative influence of those representatives.

- Third, an examination of black voters' opportunities to participate in the political process showed, if anything, an increase in the effective exercise of the electoral franchise. Given that no litigant contested that a substantial majority of black voters in the state voted Democratic, an examination of black voters' opportunities to participate in the political process showed, if anything, an increase in the effective exercise of the electoral franchise, as some statistics—that the 34 districts in the 2001 plan with a black voting-age population of above 20 percent consisted almost entirely of districts that had an overall percentage of Democratic votes of above 50 percent--

(a) made it more likely that black voters would constitute an effective voting bloc, even if they could not always elect the candidate of their choice; and
(b) buttressed the testimony of a plan designer that the plan's goal was to maintain or increase black voting strength and relatedly to increase the prospects of Democratic victory.

=== Concurrences ===
Kennedy concurred, arguing that

(1) race had been a predominant factor in drawing the lines of Georgia's 2001 state-senate redistricting map;
(2) considerations of race that would have doomed a redistricting plan under the Federal Constitution's Fourteenth Amendment or § 2 of the Voting Rights Act (42 USCS § 1973) seemed to be what would save such a plan under § 5; and
(3) while the Supreme Court's decisions controlling the § 5 analysis required the court's ruling in the case at hand, the discord and inconsistency between § 2 and § 5 ought to be noted and—in a future case where this issue was properly raised—confronted.

Thomas said that while he continued to adhere to the views expressed in his opinion concurring in the judgment in Holder v Hall (1994) 512 US 874—in which he had said, among other matters, that the court's expansive reading of the Voting Rights Act had involved the federal judiciary in dividing the nation into racially segregated electoral districts—he joined the court's opinion in the case at hand, because it was fully consistent with the court's § 5 precedents.

=== Dissents ===
Souter—joined by Stevens, Ginsburg, and Breyer—dissented, on the grounds that

(1) while § 5's prudential objective was not betrayed if a state could show that a new districting plan shifted from supermajority districts, in which minorities could elect their candidates of choice by their own voting power, to coalition districts, in which minorities were in fact shown to have a similar opportunity when joined by predictably supportive nonminority voters, the state ought to bear the burden of proving that nonminority voters would reliably vote along with minority voters;
(2) the Supreme Court's decision in the case at hand--by redefining effective voting power, in § 5 analysis, without the anchoring reference to electing a candidate of choice--(a) went beyond recognizing the possibility of coalition districts, and (b) left § 5's nonretrogression requirement substantially diminished and practically unadministrable; (3) one District Court finding--that Georgia had not shown the possibility of actual coalitions in the affected state-senate districts that would allow any retreat from majority-minority districts without a retrogressive effect--should have been (a) crucial, and (b) invulnerable under the correct clear-error standard of review; and (4) instead, the Supreme Court had mistakenly (a) discovered evidence which the Supreme Court thought the District Court had overlooked, and (b) drawn evidentiary conclusions which the District Court supposedly had not seen.

== See also ==
- Wesberry v. Sanders, 376 U.S. 1 (1964): Georgia congressional redistricting case
- Thornburg v. Gingles, 478 U.S. 30 (1986)
- Miller v. Johnson, 515 U.S. 900 (1995): Georgia congressional redistricting case
- Alabama Legislative Black Caucus v. Alabama, 575 U.S. ___ (2015)
- List of United States Supreme Court cases, volume 539
