= State Farm Mutual Automobile Insurance Co. v. Campbell =

- Supreme Court of the United States

Argued December 11, 2002 Decided April 7, 2003
- Full case name: State Farm Mutual Auto Insurance v. Curtis Campbell
- Docket no.: 01-1289
- Citations: 538 U.S. 408 (more) 123 S. Ct. 1513; 155 L. Ed. 2d 585; 2003 U.S. LEXIS 2713

Case history
- Prior: Campbell v. State Farm Mutual Automotive Insurance Co., 2001 WL 1246676 (Utah 2001)

Holding
- 145 million dollars of punitive damages, when the compensatory damages are 1 million is excessive and a violation of the Due Process Clause of the Fourteenth Amendment.

Court membership
- Chief Justice William Rehnquist Associate Justices John P. Stevens · Sandra Day O'Connor; Antonin Scalia · Anthony Kennedy; David Souter · Clarence Thomas; Ruth Bader Ginsburg · Stephen Breyer

Case opinions
- Majority: Kennedy, joined by Rehnquist, Stevens, O'Connor, Souter, Breyer
- Dissent: Scalia
- Dissent: Thomas
- Dissent: Ginsburg

Laws applied
- U.S. Const. amend. XIV

State Farm Mutual Automobile Insurance Co. v. Campbell, 538 U.S. 408 (2003), was a case in which the United States Supreme Court held that the Due Process Clause usually limits punitive damage awards to less than ten times the size of the compensatory damages awarded and that punitive damage awards of four times the compensatory damage award is "close to the line of constitutional impropriety".

The Court reached this conclusion applying guideposts first noted in BMW of North America, Inc. v. Gore, 517 U.S. 559 (1996), requiring courts to consider:

1. the degree of reprehensibility of the defendant's misconduct;
2. the disparity between the actual or potential harm suffered by the plaintiff and the punitive damages award; and
3. the difference between the punitive damages awarded by the jury and the civil penalties authorized or imposed in comparable cases.

== Case history ==
=== Background ===
In 1981, Curtis Campbell (who was insured by State Farm) caused an accident in which Todd Ospital was killed and Robert G. Slusher was left permanently disabled; both witnesses to the accident and investigators confirmed Campbell was at fault.

Notwithstanding the evidence against Campbell, State Farm decided to contest liability and decline the settlement offers from both Slusher and Ospital's estate (both parties were offering to settle for $25,000 each, or $50,000 total, which was the policy limit). State Farm assured the Campbells that "their assets were safe, that they had no liability for the accident, that [State Farm] would represent their interests, and that they did not need to procure separate counsel."

However, a jury rendered a verdict that Campbell was 100 percent liable for the accident and awarded a judgment of $185,849. State Farm refused to pay the excess amount, nor would it post a supersedeas bond to allow Campbell to appeal the verdict; Campbell obtained his own counsel to appeal the verdict.

=== Appeals on verdict against Campbell ===
While the appeal was pending, in late 1984, the Campbells reached a settlement with Slusher and Ospital's estate, whereby those parties agreed not to seek satisfaction of the judgment against the Campbells, and the Campbells would pursue an insurance bad faith action against State Farm. The attorneys for Slusher and Ospital's estate would represent the Campbells in the bad-faith suit and would make all major decisions regarding it. No settlement would take effect without the approval of Slusher and Ospital's estate, who would receive 90 percent of any verdict against State Farm.

In 1989 the Utah Supreme Court denied Campbell's appeal. State Farm then paid the entire amount of the judgment including the excess amount. Nevertheless, the Campbells filed suit against State Farm alleging bad faith, fraud, and intentional infliction of emotional distress.

=== Campbell's trial v. State Farm ===
Initially, the trial court granted summary judgment for State Farm as it had paid the entire amount of the judgment, but the ruling was reversed on appeal.

The Utah Supreme Court reinstated a $145 million punitive verdict against State Farm, noting that an earlier $100 million judgment had gone unreported to State Farm's corporate headquarters, and that the regional vice president had no plans to report the judgment under review, despite the judgment being substantially based on evidence of national corporate policy.

== Dissents ==
Justices Antonin Scalia and Clarence Thomas adhered to their previously expressed views that the Due Process Clause and Constitution provide no protection against "excessive" punitive damage awards.

Justice Ruth Bader Ginsburg voted to leave intact the decision of the Utah Supreme Court. She expressed her view that the Supreme Court "has no warrant to reform state law governing awards of punitive damages." Instead, Ginsburg wrote, while "damage-capping legislation may be altogether fitting and proper" (emphasis added), only "a legislative scheme or a state high court" is "authorized" to institute such a change in the law.

== See also ==
- List of United States Supreme Court cases, volume 538
- List of United States Supreme Court cases
