= Connecticut Department of Public Safety v. Doe =

- Supreme Court of the United States

Argued November 13, 2002 Decided March 5, 2003
- Full case name: Connecticut Department of Public Safety, et al., Petitioners v. John Doe, individually and on behalf of all others similarly situated
- Citations: 538 U.S. 1 (more) 123 S. Ct. 1160; 155 L. Ed. 2d 98

Case history
- Prior: Doe v. Dep't of Pub. Safety ex rel. Lee, 271 F.3d 38 (2d Cir. 2001)

Holding
- Due process does not require the opportunity to prove a fact that is not material to a state's statutory scheme.

Court membership
- Chief Justice William Rehnquist Associate Justices John P. Stevens · Sandra Day O'Connor; Antonin Scalia · Anthony Kennedy; David Souter · Clarence Thomas; Ruth Bader Ginsburg · Stephen Breyer

Case opinions
- Majority: Rehnquist, joined by O'Connor, Scalia, Kennedy, Souter, Thomas, Ginsburg, Breyer
- Concurrence: Scalia
- Concurrence: Souter, joined by Ginsburg
- Concurrence: Stevens (in judgment)

Connecticut Department of Public Safety v. Doe, 538 U.S. 1 (2003), was a United States Supreme Court case in which the court held that due process does not require the opportunity to prove a fact that is not material to a state's statutory scheme. Mere injury to reputation does not implicate a liberty interest.

== Background ==
Among other things, Connecticut's "Megan's Law" requires people convicted of sexual offenses to register with the Department of Public Safety (DPS) upon their release into the community, and requires DPS to post a sex offender registry containing registrants' names, addresses, photographs, and descriptions on a website and to make the registry available to the public in certain state offices.

The website contained the following disclaimer:

The registry is based on the legislature’s decision to facilitate access to publicly-available information about persons convicted of sexual offenses. [DPS] has not considered or assessed the specific risk of reoffense with regard to any individual prior to his or her inclusion within this registry, and has made no determination that any individual included in the registry is currently dangerous. Individuals included within the registry are included solely by virtue of their conviction record and state law. The main purpose of providing this data on the Internet is to make the information more easily available and accessible, not to warn about any specific individual.

Doe, a convicted sex offender who was subject to the law, filed a 42 U.S.C. § 1983 action on behalf of himself and similarly situated sex offenders, claiming that the law violated, among other things, the Fourteenth Amendment's Due Process Clause. The federal District Court granted Doe summary judgment, certified a class of people subject to the law, and permanently enjoined the law's public disclosure provisions. The Second Circuit Court of Appeals affirmed, concluding that such disclosure both deprived registered sex offenders of a "liberty interest," and violated the Due Process Clause because officials did not afford registrants a pre-deprivation hearing to determine whether they are likely to be "currently dangerous."

The Supreme Court granted certiorari.

== Opinion of the Court ==
The Supreme Court issued an opinion on March 5, 2003. The court held that due process does not require the opportunity to prove a fact that is not material to the State's statutory scheme. Injury to reputation in itself, even if defamatory, does not constitute deprivation of liberty. The Second Circuit's judgment was reversed.
