= Smith v. Doe =

- Supreme Court of the United States

Argued November 13, 2002 Decided March 5, 2003
- Full case name: Delbert W. Smith and Bruce M. Botelho, Petitioners v. John Doe I et al.
- Docket no.: 01-729
- Citations: 538 U.S. 84 (more) 123 S. Ct. 1140; 155 L. Ed. 2d 164

Holding
- Because the Alaska Sex Offender Registration Act is nonpunitive, its retroactive application does not violate the ex post facto clause.

Court membership
- Chief Justice William Rehnquist Associate Justices John P. Stevens · Sandra Day O'Connor; Antonin Scalia · Anthony Kennedy; David Souter · Clarence Thomas; Ruth Bader Ginsburg · Stephen Breyer

Case opinions
- Majority: Kennedy, joined by Rehnquist, O'Connor, Scalia, Thomas
- Concurrence: Thomas
- Concurrence: Souter (in judgment)
- Dissent: Stevens
- Dissent: Ginsburg, joined by Breyer

Smith v. Doe, 538 U.S. 84 (2003), was a court case in the United States which questioned the constitutionality of the Alaska Sex Offender Registration Act's retroactive requirements. Under the Act, any sex offender must register with the Department of Corrections or local law enforcement within one business day of entering the state. This information is forwarded to the Department of Public Safety, which maintains a public database. Fingerprints, Social Security number, anticipated change of address, and medical treatment after the offense are kept confidential. The offender's name, aliases, address, photograph, physical description, driver's license number, motor vehicle identification numbers, place of employment, date of birth, crime, date and place of conviction, and length and conditions of sentence are part of the public record, maintained on the Internet.

Smith v. Doe questioned the constitutionality of the act's retroactive requirements. John Does I and II were convicted of aggravated assault before the act's passage and filed suit, claiming the act was punitive and violated the ex post facto clause of Article I of the U.S. Constitution. The district court ruled against the Does, ruling that the act was nonpunitive. The appeals court sided with the Does that the act was in fact punitive and violated ex post facto.

== Supreme Court's ruling ==
Held: Because the Alaska Sex Offender Registration Act is nonpunitive, its retroactive application does not violate the ex post facto clause.

The question is if the intention was to impose a punishment or "civil proceedings". If the intention was to punish, that ends the inquiry. If the intention was to enact a regulatory scheme that is civil and nonpunitive, the Court must examine whether the scheme is so punitive as to negate the State's intention to deem it civil. Because the Court ordinarily defers to the legislature's stated intent, only the clearest proof will suffice to override that intent and transform what has been denominated a civil remedy into a criminal penalty. The Court decided 6–3 that the legislature's intent was to create a civil, nonpunitive program to protect the public and that the resulting dissemination of the registration information was not significant enough to declare as debilitating.

The dissenting justices contended that the law was punitive and imposed severe deprivations of liberty. Justice Stevens' dissenting opinion said, "It is also clear beyond peradventure that these unique consequences of conviction of a sex offense are punitive. They share three characteristics, which in the aggregate are not present in any civil sanction. The sanctions (1) constitute a severe deprivation of the offender's liberty, (2) are imposed on everyone who is convicted of a relevant criminal offense, and (3) are imposed only on those criminals. Unlike any of the cases that the Court has cited, a criminal conviction under these statutes provides both a sufficient and a necessary condition for the sanction".

== See also ==
- List of United States Supreme Court cases, volume 538
- List of United States Supreme Court cases
