= Nevada Department of Human Resources v. Hibbs =

- Supreme Court of the United States

Argued January 15, 2003 Decided May 27, 2003
- Full case name: Nevada Department of Human Resources, et al. v. William Hibbs, et al.
- Citations: 538 U.S. 721 (more) 123 S. Ct. 1972; 155 L. Ed. 2d 953; 2003 U.S. LEXIS 4272; 71 USLW 4375; 84 Empl. Prac. Dec. (CCH) P 41,391; 148 Lab. Cas. (CCH) P 34,704; 8 Wage & Hour Cas.2d (BNA) 1221; 26 NDLR P 35; 03 Cal. Daily Op. Serv. 4388; 2003 Daily Journal D.A.R. 5569; 16 Fla. L. Weekly Fed. S 291

Case history
- Prior: 273 F.3d 844 (9th Cir. 2001), cert. granted, 536 U.S. 938 (2002).

Holding
- The Family and Medical Leave Act of 1993 validly abrogated state sovereign immunity.

Court membership
- Chief Justice William Rehnquist Associate Justices John P. Stevens · Sandra Day O'Connor; Antonin Scalia · Anthony Kennedy; David Souter · Clarence Thomas; Ruth Bader Ginsburg · Stephen Breyer

Case opinions
- Majority: Rehnquist, joined by O'Connor, Souter, Ginsburg, Breyer
- Concurrence: Souter, joined by Ginsburg, Breyer
- Concurrence: Stevens (in judgment)
- Dissent: Scalia
- Dissent: Kennedy, joined by Scalia, Thomas

Laws applied
- U.S. Const. amends. XI, XIV; Family and Medical Leave Act of 1993, 29 U.S.C. §§ 2601–2654.

Nevada Department of Human Resources v. Hibbs, 538 U.S. 721 (2003), was a United States Supreme Court case which held that the Family and Medical Leave Act of 1993 was "narrowly targeted" at "sex-based overgeneralization" and was thus a "valid exercise of [congressional] power under Section 5 of the Fourteenth Amendment."

== The law ==
=== The FMLA ===
The Family and Medical Leave Act (FMLA) allows eligible employees to take up to 12 work weeks of unpaid leave annually for several reasons, including the birth of a child or the "serious health condition" of the employee's spouse, child, or parent. The FMLA also authorizes employees whose rights under the FMLA have been violated to sue their employer for equitable relief and money damages.

In enacting the FMLA, Congress invoked two of the powers it possesses under the Constitution. In regulating private employers under the FMLA, it invoked its power under the Commerce Clause. In regulating public employers, it relied on its power under Section 5 of the Fourteenth Amendment. Section 5 gives Congress the power "to enforce, by appropriate legislation, the provisions of [the Fourteenth Amendment]." One of these provisions is the Equal Protection Clause, which prohibits states from denying to persons within their jurisdiction "the equal protection of the laws." It was its power to enforce the Equal Protection Clause which Congress invoked in enacting the FMLA.

=== State sovereign immunity ===
In Hans v. Louisiana (1890), the Supreme Court of the United States held that the Eleventh Amendment prohibits states from being sued in federal court without their consent by their own citizens, despite the Eleventh Amendment's literal language. Congress, however, when acting under its Section 5 power, may abrogate state sovereign immunity and allow states to be sued for money damages. The Supreme Court has held that Congress may do this only if the private remedies it enacts under Section 5 have "congruence and proportionality" to the constitutional wrongs which it seeks to redress. Without the requisite congruence and proportionality, Congress cannot constitutionally authorize private litigants to recover money damages from the states, although such litigants can sue for equitable relief.

== Facts and procedural history of the case ==
William Hibbs worked for the Nevada Department of Human Resources in its Welfare Division. He requested leave from the Department under the FMLA in order to care for his wife, who had been in a car accident and undergone neck surgery. The Department granted the request and told Hibbs he could use the full 12 weeks of FMLA leave intermittently as needed between May and December 1997. He used the leave intermittently until August 5 of that year, after which he did not return to work. In October the Department informed Hibbs that he had exhausted his FMLA leave and was required to report to work by November 12. When he failed to report, he was fired.

Hibbs then sued the Department in the United States District Court for the District of Nevada for alleged violations of the FMLA. He sought money damages and other relief. The district court granted the Department summary judgment, finding that Hibbs's claim under the FMLA was barred by the Eleventh Amendment. Hibbs appealed the ruling to the United States Court of Appeals for the Ninth Circuit, which held that the FMLA was a valid exercise of Congress's power under the Fourteenth Amendment, and reversed the district court's grant of summary judgment. Thereafter the Supreme Court granted certiorari.

== Majority opinion ==
The majority, in an opinion authored by Chief Justice William Rehnquist, began by reaffirming City of Boerne v. Flores (1997), which was the first case to set down the "congruence and proportionality" requirement for laws enacted under Section 5 of the Fourteenth Amendment. The Court stated that while "Congress' power to enforce' the [Fourteenth] Amendment includes the authority both to remedy and to deter violation of rights guaranteed thereunder by prohibiting a somewhat broader swath of conduct, including that which is not itself forbidden by the Amendment's text", the remedies which Congress enacts to enforce the Amendment must not constitute "an attempt to substantively redefine the States' legal obligations." To prevent Congress from doing this, the Court said, its case law required Section 5 legislation to "exhibit 'congruence and proportionality between the injury to be prevented or remedied and the means adopted to that end.'"

The Court acknowledged that Congress, by enacting the FMLA, had sought "to protect the right to be free from gender-based discrimination in the workplace." The FMLA was meant to protect that right by guaranteeing to working women, who Congress found usually bear the primary responsibility for family caretaking, the right to take unpaid leave to deal with this responsibility while still retaining employment. Whether the FMLA was constitutional depended on whether Congress had evidence that the states were systematically violating women's workplace rights. Citing Bradwell v. Illinois and Goesaert v. Cleary, the majority acknowledged that there was a long history of legally sanctioned discrimination against women in employment opportunities.

Congress, the majority said, first responded to this inequality by passing Title VII of the Civil Rights Act of 1964. Title VII's abrogation of state sovereign immunity was upheld in Fitzpatrick v. Bitzer, "[b]ut," the Court said, "state gender discrimination did not cease." The Court noted that "the persistence of such unconstitutional discrimination by the States justifie[d]" the passage of the FMLA, which was designed to prevent further discrimination.

Moreover, continued the majority, Congress had evidence that state-offered parental leave for fathers was rare, and stated that "[t]his and other differential leave policies were not attributable to any differential physical needs of men and women, but rather to the pervasive sex-role stereotype that caring for family members is women's work." Even in states where the laws were supposed to offer parental leave for fathers, such laws "were applied in discriminatory ways." Taking these conditions into account, the majority concluded, Congress was justified in passing the FMLA.

The Court added that earlier cases which had struck down laws passed under Section 5 of the Fourteenth Amendment — cases such as Kimel v. Florida Board of Regents and Board of Trustees of the University of Alabama v. Garrett — were distinguishable. Those cases concerned legislation which Congress had enacted in order to combat what it considered discrimination on the basis of age and disability. The Court stated that because such discrimination is not subjected to heightened scrutiny under the Constitution, and because the laws invalidated in Kimel and Garrett prohibited almost all such discrimination, the previous cases struck down laws which bore little "congruence and proportionality" to the wrongs they sought to remedy. Gender-based discrimination, by contrast, is subjected to intermediate scrutiny under the Constitution, and so in enacting the FMLA "it was easier for Congress to show a pattern of state constitutional violations." In addition, the majority noted, the FMLA placed certain limitations on the right of employees to take leave and limited the amount of damages which aggrieved plaintiffs could recover for violations. For those reasons, the Court said, "we conclude that [the FMLA's private remedy] is congruent and proportional to its remedial object, and can 'be understood as responsive to, or designed to prevent, unconstitutional behavior.'"

== Concurrences ==
Justice Souter and Justice Stevens both wrote brief concurrences. Justice Souter, in whose concurrence Justices Ginsburg and Breyer joined, concurred in the Court's opinion. He believed that "[e]ven on this Court's view of the scope of congressional power under § 5 of the Fourteenth Amendment," the FMLA was a valid enactment. He emphasized, however, that he still disagreed with the Court's interpretation of Congress's power of enforcement under the Fourteenth Amendment, citing dissents in Kimel, Garrett, and Florida Prepaid Postsecondary Education Expense Board v. College Savings Bank.

Justice Stevens concurred in the judgment only. He doubted that the FMLA was independently valid under Section 5 of the Fourteenth Amendment, but believed that it was a constitutional use of congressional power under the Commerce Clause. Reiterating a position he and other justices had taken in past decisions, Justice Stevens stated that the Eleventh Amendment did not prevent Congress from enacting legislation under the Commerce Clause to allow citizens to sue their own states for money damages. Thus, he concluded, Hibbs's suit was not barred by sovereign immunity and could proceed.

== Dissents ==
Both Justice Scalia and Justice Kennedy filed dissents. Justice Scalia joined Justice Kennedy's dissent but wished to "add one further observation." A legal action filed against Nevada under legislation enacted in order to protect against future violations of the Equal Protection Clause, Justice Scalia said, could not be justified by showing "violations by another State, or by most other States, or even by 49 other States." Rather, the plaintiff had to show that Congress was preventing violations of the Fourteenth Amendment "by the State against which the enforcement action is taken," which in this case was Nevada. Because Congress could not rely on what he termed "guilt by association", and because he believed the majority had not shown that each of the 50 states had engaged in gender-based violations of the Equal Protection Clause, Justice Scalia concluded that the FMLA was unconstitutional.

Justice Kennedy's dissent, joined by both Justice Scalia and Justice Thomas, argued that Congress simply had not established that the states "engage[d] in widespread discrimination on the basis of gender in the provision of family leave benefits." Justice Kennedy believed the evidence summarized by the Court was too isolated and anecdotal to established such a pattern of discrimination. He also argued that the states had actually "been ahead of Congress in providing gender-neutral family leave benefits." The fact that gender classifications are subjected to heightened scrutiny, he said, "[did] not alter [his] conclusion," because Hibbs still bore the "burden to show that Congress identified a history and pattern of unconstitutional employment discrimination by the States." This was a burden, said Justice Kennedy, which Hibbs had not met. Thus the FMLA amounted to a substantive change in the reach of the Fourteenth Amendment, not an enforcement of its provisions, and under Boerne, this was unconstitutional.

== See also ==
- List of United States Supreme Court cases, volume 538
- List of United States Supreme Court cases
