= Virginia v. Black =

- Supreme Court of the United States

Argued December 11, 2002 Decided April 7, 2003
- Full case name: Virginia v. Barry Elton Black, Richard J. Elliott, and Jonathan S. O'Mara
- Docket no.: 01-1107
- Citations: 538 U.S. 343 (more) 123 S. Ct. 1536; 155 L. Ed. 2d 535
- Argument: Oral argument
- Opinion announcement: Opinion announcement

Case history
- Prior: On writ of certiorari to the Supreme Court of Virginia. Black v. Commonwealth, 262 Va. 764, 553 S.E.2d 738 (2001)
- Subsequent: Appeal after remand at Elliott v. Commonwealth, 267 Va. 464, 593 S.E.2d 263 (2004)

Holding
- Virginia's particular statute against cross burning is unconstitutional because its prima facie evidence presumption places the burden of proof on the defendant to demonstrate that he has not intended the cross burning as intimidation. However, a State, consistent with the First Amendment, may ban cross burning carried out with the intent to intimidate.

Court membership
- Chief Justice William Rehnquist Associate Justices John P. Stevens · Sandra Day O'Connor; Antonin Scalia · Anthony Kennedy; David Souter · Clarence Thomas; Ruth Bader Ginsburg · Stephen Breyer

Case opinions
- Majority: O'Connor (Parts I, II, III), joined by Rehnquist, Stevens, Scalia, Breyer
- Plurality: O'Connor (Parts IV, V), joined by Rehnquist, Stevens, Breyer
- Concurrence: Stevens
- Concur/dissent: Scalia (concurring in part, concurring in the judgment in part, and dissenting in part), joined by Thomas (Parts I, II)
- Concur/dissent: Souter (concurring in the judgment in part and dissenting in part), joined by Kennedy, Ginsburg
- Dissent: Thomas

Laws applied
- U.S. Const. amend. I

Virginia v. Black, 538 U.S. 343 (2003), is a landmark decision of the Supreme Court of the United States in which the Court held, 5–4, that any state statute banning cross burning on the basis that it constitutes prima facie evidence of intent to intimidate is a violation of the First Amendment to the Constitution. Such a provision, the Court argued, blurs the distinction between proscribable "threats of intimidation" and the Ku Klux Klan's protected "messages of shared ideology". In the case, three defendants were convicted in two separate cases of violating a Virginia statute against cross burning. However, cross-burning can be a criminal offense if the intent to intimidate is proven. It was argued by former Solicitor General of Virginia, William Hurd and Rodney A. Smolla.

== Background ==
In cases such as Chaplinsky v. New Hampshire, 315 U.S. 568 (1942), New York Times Co. v. Sullivan, 376 U.S. 254 (1964), R.A.V. v. City of St. Paul (1992) and others, the Supreme Court has addressed various areas of controversial speech. The Court has frequently sided with the speakers, but occasionally the Court has sided with the government and acknowledged its (limited) power to pass laws protecting citizens from specific types of harmful speech.

=== Virginia's cross burning ban ===
In 1952, the Virginia Legislature passed a law banning the wearing of masks in public and cross burning after members of the Ku Klux Klan – Bill Hendricks of Florida and Thomas Hamilton of South Carolina – announced plans to hold rallies in the state. Governor John Battle signed the bill into law in that April. In December 1966, Governor Mills Godwin announced a $1,000 reward for information leading to the arrest of cross burners and in response the Ku Klux Klan burned a cross in front of the Executive Mansion. A slew of cross burnings across the state followed.

In 1967, Wilson Ralph Price and Nanny Jane Price were arrested and convicted for burning a cross on a public sidewalk in Richmond, but the Virginia Supreme Court overturned their conviction the next year finding the ban did not apply to public property because the statutes language limited it to the cross burnings "on the property of another." In 1968, the Virginia Legislature amended the state law to apply to public property and included a section that specified "the unlawful burning of a cross shall be prima facie evidence of the intention to intimidate a person or group of persons."

=== Arrests and convictions ===
Three defendants were found guilty of violating Virginia's anti-cross burning statute. The cases were combined upon appeal and reached the U.S. Supreme Court during the Fall 2002 session.

==== Elliot and O'Mara ====
On May 2, 1998, Richard Elliot and Jonathan O'Mara attempted to light a cross on the property of Elliot's neighbor (who was black) in Virginia Beach, Virginia. In 2001, the Supreme Court of Virginia found that the cross burning statute was unconstitutional and overturned Elliot and O'Mara's convictions. Virginia appealed the case to the U.S. Supreme Court arguing that Elliot and O'Mara's convictions should have been upheld because they had clear intent to intimidate when they lit a cross on the property of another without the owner's consent.

==== Barry Black ====
On August 22, 1998, Barry Black held a Ku Klux Klan rally on private property and with the consent of the owner in Cana, Virginia, located in rural Carroll County. A neighbor and the county sheriff witnessed the event and heard attendees make many negative comments concerning black people. During the rally Black lit a cross, was arrested, and charged with violating the state's ban on cross burnings.

In June 1999, Black, who was represented by an African American American Civil Liberties Union attorney named David Baugh, was found guilty by an all-white jury after 25 minutes of deliberations and sentenced to a $2,500 fine. Black appealed and in December 2000 the Virginia Court of Appeals affirmed his conviction. In 2001, the Supreme Court of Virginia found that the cross burning statute was unconstitutional and overturned Black's conviction.

== Decision ==
Question	Kennedy	Souter	Ginsburg	Rehnquist	Stevens	O'Connor	Breyer	Scalia	Thomas
Va. Code Ann. § 18.2-423 is unconstitutional because it precludes rebuttal of the intent to intimidate.	Yes	Yes	Yes	Yes	Yes	Yes	Yes	No	No
The requirement that cross-burning be considered prima facie evidence of intent to intimidate may be unconstitutional.	No	No	No	Yes	Yes	Yes	Yes	Yes	No
A state, consistent with the First Amendment, may ban cross burning carried out with the intent to intimidate.	No	No	No	Yes	Yes	Yes	Yes	Yes	Yes
A state can always prohibit cross-burning because of its affiliation with terrorism.	No	No	No	No	No	No	No	No	Yes

=== Majority ===
Justice Sandra Day O'Connor delivered the opinion stating, "a State, consistent with the First Amendment, may ban cross burning carried out with the intent to intimidate." In so doing, the Court considered the speech to be constitutionally unprotected "true threats." Under that carve-out, "a State may choose to prohibit only those forms of intimidation that are most likely to inspire fear of bodily harm."

In Virginia v. Black the Court found that Virginia's statute against cross burning is unconstitutional with respect to the text in the statute that states "Any such burning of a cross shall be prima facie evidence of an intent to intimidate a person or group of persons." This text in particular was found to be unconstitutional as it violates the Fourteenth Amendment insofar as it provides the presumption, that the act of cross burning is evidence of the intent to intimidate. In Sandstrom v. Montana, 442 U.S. 510, 99 S. Ct. 2450, 61 L. Ed. 2d 39 (1979), the Court held when a jury is instructed in such a manner where;

the law presumes a person intends the ordinary consequences of his voluntary acts, [the jury] may have interpreted the presumption as conclusive or as shifting the burden of persuasion, and because either interpretation would have violated the Fourteenth Amendment's requirement that the state prove every element of a criminal offense beyond a reasonable doubt, the instruction given was unconstitutional.

In essence, the Fourteenth Amendment prevents a jury instruction when that instruction includes: a presumption, that shifts the burden of persuasion with regards to an essential element of the crime away from the state and onto the defendant, in a criminal trial. Thus, the Fourteenth Amendment was violated by the text of the statute where the intent to intimidate was presumed from the action of cross burning.

However, the Court found the statute constitutional with regards to the language limiting cross burning with the intent to intimidate as a valid conduct restriction as the regulation was: within the constitutional power of the government, where the conduct regulation furthers an important government interest and such government interest is unrelated to the suppression of speech, and the incidental burden (secondary effect) on speech is no greater than necessary. By structuring the language of the statute to restrict conduct only with the intent to intimidate, the Virginia legislature satisfied all three prongs of the O'Brien test (see United States v. O'Brien, 391 U.S. 367 (1968)). The limitation of the conduct was within the constitutional power of the government based on the First Amendment exception known as the "true threats" doctrine. The conduct restriction furthered an important government interest that was unrelated to the suppression of speech, because, "cross burning done with the intent to intimidate has a long and pernicious history as a signal of impending violence." Virginia v. Black, 538 U.S. 343, 123 S. Ct. 1536, 1539, 155 L. Ed. 2d 535 (2003). Finally, the secondary effect on speech was no greater than necessary as it restricted the conduct only when accompanied by the intent to intimidate.

It is important to distinguish the Virginia statute from a similar statute which was held facially unconstitutional in R.A.V. v. City of St. Paul, Minn., 505 U.S. 377, 112 S. Ct. 2538, 120 L. Ed. 2d 305 (1992), because it prohibited otherwise permitted speech solely on the basis of the subjects the speech addresses.

=== Dissents and concurrences ===
Justice Clarence Thomas argued that cross-burning itself should be a First Amendment exception, as others have argued regarding flag-burning (see Chief Justice William Rehnquist’s dissenting opinion in Texas v. Johnson), due to the historical association of cross-burning with terrorism. "[T]his statute," Thomas wrote, "prohibits only conduct, not expression. And, just as one cannot burn down someone's house to make a political point and then seek refuge in the First Amendment, those who hate cannot terrorize and intimidate to make their point."

Justice David Souter authored an opinion that was joined by Justice Ruth Bader Ginsburg and Justice Anthony Kennedy that argued that cross-burning, even with the proven intent to intimidate, should not be a crime under the R.A.V. v. City of St. Paul precedent because of the statute’s content-based distinction.

== See also ==
- List of United States Supreme Court cases, volume 538
- List of United States Supreme Court cases by the Rehnquist Court
- List of United States Supreme Court cases involving the First Amendment
