= Chavez v. Martinez =

- Supreme Court of the United States

Argued December 4, 2002 Decided May 27, 2003
- Full case name: Ben Chavez v. Oliverio Martinez
- Citations: 538 U.S. 760 (more) 123 S. Ct. 1994; 155 L. Ed. 2d 984

Court membership
- Chief Justice William Rehnquist Associate Justices John P. Stevens · Sandra Day O'Connor; Antonin Scalia · Anthony Kennedy; David Souter · Clarence Thomas; Ruth Bader Ginsburg · Stephen Breyer

Case opinions
- Plurality: Thomas, joined by Rehnquist (in full); O'Connor (Parts I and II-A); Scalia (Parts I and II)
- Plurality: Souter, joined by Breyer (Part I and II); Stevens, Kennedy, Ginsburg (Part II)
- Concurrence: Scalia (in judgment)
- Concur/dissent: Stevens
- Concur/dissent: Kennedy, joined by Stevens (in full); Ginsburg (in part)
- Concur/dissent: Ginsburg

Chavez v. Martinez, 538 U.S. 760 (2003), was a decision of the United States Supreme Court, which held that a police officer does not deprive a suspect of constitutional rights by failing to issue a Miranda warning. However, the court held open the possibility that the right to substantive due process could be violated in certain egregious circumstances and remanded the case to the lower court to decide this issue on the case's facts.

A complex series of concurrences and dissents were filed, many partially joined by various justices. Justice Thomas announced the judgment of the court, finding that no constitutional rights were violated. However, the only opinion to gain the votes of a majority of the court was Part II of Souter's concurrence, which consisted of a direction to the lower court to consider the substantive due process claims on remand.

== Background ==
In 1997, during an altercation with the police in Oxnard, California, the respondent Martinez was shot five times. He was very seriously injured. The police officer's supervisor—the petitioner, Chavez—arrived at the scene around the same time as the paramedics. He rode in the ambulance with Martinez and accompanied him into the hospital. Throughout this time, Martinez was often conscious but in great distress, repeatedly stating that he was dying and requesting treatment. Without informing Martinez of his Miranda rights, Chavez sporadically interviewed Martinez about the incident over a period of 45 minutes. Martinez survived the incident, but was partially paralyzed and left blind. He was never charged with a crime and his answers were never used against him in any criminal prosecution.

Martinez sued Chavez in a §1983 action alleging that his constitutional rights had been violated. The district court found that Chavez had violated at least two of Martinez's clearly established rights: the 5th Amendment right not to be compelled to be a witness against himself and his 14th Amendment right not to be subjected to coercive questioning. Because of this violation, the district court held that Chavez was not entitled to qualified immunity. The 9th Circuit affirmed this ruling. The Supreme Court then granted certiorari.

== Opinion ==
Justice Thomas announced the judgment of the Court and delivered an opinion.

=== Fifth Amendment ===
==== Thomas opinion ====
The Fifth Amendment requires that “[n]o person ... shall be compelled in any criminal case to be a witness against himself.” We fail to see how, based on the text of the Fifth Amendment, Martinez can allege a violation of this right, since Martinez was never prosecuted for a crime, let alone compelled to be a witness against himself in a criminal case.

Although Martinez contends that the meaning of “criminal case” should encompass the entire criminal investigatory process, including police interrogations, we disagree. In our view, a “criminal case” at the very least requires the initiation of legal proceedings. We need not decide today the precise moment when a “criminal case” commences; it is enough to say that police questioning does not constitute a “case” any more than a private investigator’s precomplaint activities constitute a “civil case.” Statements compelled by police interrogations of course may not be used against a defendant at trial, but it is not until their use in a criminal case that a violation of the Self-Incrimination Clause occurs.

Here, Martinez was never made to be a “witness” against himself in violation of the Fifth Amendment’s Self-Incrimination Clause because his statements were never admitted as testimony against him in a criminal case. Nor was he ever placed under oath and exposed to “`the cruel trilemma of self-accusation, perjury or contempt.'” The text of the Self-Incrimination Clause simply cannot support the Ninth Circuit’s view that the mere use of compulsive questioning, without more, violates the Constitution.

Although our cases have permitted the Fifth Amendment’s self-incrimination privilege to be asserted in noncriminal cases, that does not alter our conclusion that a violation of the constitutional right against self-incrimination occurs only if one has been compelled to be a witness against himself in a criminal case.
