= Gratz v. Bollinger =

- Supreme Court of the United States

Argued April 1, 2003 Decided June 23, 2003
- Full case name: Jennifer Gratz and Patrick Hamacher v. Lee Bollinger, et al.
- Docket no.: 02-516
- Citations: 539 U.S. 244 (more) 123 S. Ct. 2411; 156 L. Ed. 2d 257; 2003 U.S. LEXIS 4801; 71 U.S.L.W. 4480; 91 Fair Empl. Prac. Cas. (BNA) 1803; 84 Empl. Prac. Dec. (CCH) ¶ 41,416; 2003 Cal. Daily Op. Service 5362; 16 Fla. L. Weekly Fed. S 387

Case history
- Prior: Summary judgment granted in part to plaintiffs, 122 F. Supp. 2d 811 (E.D. Mich. 2000); Summary judgment granted to plaintiffs, 135 F. Supp. 2d 790 (E.D. Mich. 2001); consolidated on appeal with Grutter v. Bollinger before en banc court, 277 F.3d 803 (6th Cir. 2001); cert. before judgment granted, 537 U.S. 1044 (2002).
- Subsequent: On remand, 80 Fed. App'x 417 (6th Cir. 2003)

Holding
- A state university's admission policy violated the Equal Protection Clause of the Fourteenth Amendment because its ranking system gave an automatic point increase to all racial minorities rather than making individual determinations.

Court membership
- Chief Justice William Rehnquist Associate Justices John P. Stevens · Sandra Day O'Connor; Antonin Scalia · Anthony Kennedy; David Souter · Clarence Thomas; Ruth Bader Ginsburg · Stephen Breyer

Case opinions
- Majority: Rehnquist, joined by O'Connor, Scalia, Kennedy, Thomas
- Concurrence: O'Connor, joined by Breyer (in part)
- Concurrence: Thomas
- Concurrence: Breyer (in judgment)
- Dissent: Stevens, joined by Souter
- Dissent: Souter, joined by Ginsburg (in part)
- Dissent: Ginsburg, joined by Souter, Breyer (in part)

Laws applied
- U.S. Const. amend. XIV

Gratz v. Bollinger, 539 U.S. 244 (2003), was a United States Supreme Court case regarding the University of Michigan undergraduate affirmative action admissions policy. In a 6–3 decision announced on June 23, 2003, Chief Justice Rehnquist, writing for the Court, ruled the University's point system's "predetermined point allocations" that awarded 20 points towards admission to underrepresented minorities "ensures that the diversity contributions of applicants cannot be individually assessed" and was therefore unconstitutional. It was the companion case to Grutter v. Bollinger.

== Case ==
The University of Michigan used a 150-point scale to rank applicants, with 100 points needed to guarantee admission. The University gave underrepresented ethnic groups, including African-Americans, Hispanics, and Native Americans, an automatic 20-point bonus towards their score, while a perfect SAT score was worth 12 points.

The petitioners, Jennifer Gratz and Patrick Hamacher, both residents of Michigan, applied for admission to the University of Michigan's College of Literature, Science, and the Arts (LSA). Gratz applied for admission in the fall of 1995 and Hamacher in the fall of 1997. Both were subsequently denied admission to the university. Gratz and Hamacher were contacted by the Center for Individual Rights, which filed a lawsuit on their behalf in October 1997.

The case was filed in the United States District Court for the Eastern District of Michigan against the University of Michigan, the College of LSA, James Duderstadt, and Lee Bollinger. Duderstadt was president of the university while Gratz's application was under consideration, and Bollinger while Hamacher's was under consideration. Their class-action lawsuit alleged "violations and threatened violations of the rights of the plaintiffs and the class they represent to equal protection of the laws under the Fourteenth Amendment... and for racial discrimination."

Like Grutter, the case was heard in District Court, appealed to the Sixth Circuit Court of Appeals, and asked to be heard before the Supreme Court.

== U.S. Supreme Court consideration ==
=== Issue of standing ===
It has been argued by some that Jennifer Gratz lacked legal standing to bring this action. Gratz applied in 1995, three years before the University of Michigan adopted its points system. Gratz could not claim injury as a result of the points system, and thus, under traditional legal rules, Gratz lacked standing. Gratz chose not to attend the University of Michigan by declining the university's offer to be placed on a waiting list. Every Michigan student who agreed to go onto the waiting list in the spring of 1995 was admitted to the University of Michigan for the Fall 1995 semester. However, Gratz argues that she did fill out the paperwork for the waiting list, but the University claims it got lost.

Chief Justice Rehnquist delivered the opinion of the court. The court's majority found that Gratz and co-plaintiff Hamacher had standing to seek declaratory and injunctive relief, relying on Northeastern Fla. Chapter, Associated Gen. Contractors of America v. Jacksonville, 508 U.S. 656 (1993). Here the "injury in fact" necessary to establish standing in the case was the denial of equal treatment resulting from the imposition of the barrier, and not in the ultimate inability to obtain the benefit.

=== Opinion of the Court ===
The court held that because the university’s use of race in its current freshmen admissions policy was not narrowly tailored to achieve the respondents' asserted interest in diversity, the policy violated the Equal Protection Clause.

=== Dissent ===
Justices Stevens, Souter, and Ginsburg dissented. Ginsburg wrote that "government decisionmakers may properly distinguish between policies of exclusion and inclusion...Actions designed to burden groups long denied full citizenship stature are not sensibly ranked with measures taken to hasten the day when entrenched discrimination and its after effects have been extirpated."

== See also ==
- Grutter v. Bollinger (2003)
- List of class action lawsuits
- List of United States Supreme Court cases, volume 539
