= Robinson v. California =

- Supreme Court of the United States

Argued April 17, 1962 Decided June 25, 1962
- Full case name: Robinson v. California
- Citations: 370 U.S. 660 (more) 82 S. Ct. 1417; 8 L. Ed. 2d 758; 1962 U.S. LEXIS 850

Case history
- Prior: Appeal from the Appellate Department, Superior Court of California of the County of Los Angeles.
- Subsequent: Rehearing denied, 371 U.S. 905 (1962).

Holding
- Punishing a person for a medical condition is a violation of the Eighth Amendment ban on cruel and unusual punishment.

Court membership
- Chief Justice Earl Warren Associate Justices Hugo Black · Felix Frankfurter; William O. Douglas · Tom C. Clark; John M. Harlan II · William J. Brennan Jr. Potter Stewart · Byron White

Case opinions
- Majority: Stewart, joined by Warren, Black, Douglas, Harlan, Brennan
- Concurrence: Douglas
- Concurrence: Harlan
- Dissent: Clark
- Dissent: White
- Frankfurter took no part in the consideration or decision of the case.

Laws applied
- U.S. Const. amends. VIII, XIV

Robinson v. California, 370 U.S. 660 (1962), is the first landmark decision of the United States Supreme Court in which the Eighth Amendment of the Constitution was interpreted to prohibit particular acts or conduct, as contrasted with prohibiting the use of a particular form of punishment for a crime. In Robinson, the Court struck down a California law that criminalized being addicted to narcotics.

== Background ==
Robinson was stopped by a police officer who observed "tracks" on Robinson's arms from heroin use. The officer claimed Robinson admitted that he had occasionally injected narcotics, though Robinson denied admitting this, and also denied being an addict. The police arrested him under California law making it a misdemeanor to "be addicted to the use of narcotics"; Robinson was convicted in the Municipal Court of Los Angeles, and sentenced to 90 days' imprisonment. Robinson appealed his conviction to the Appellate Department of the Los Angeles County Superior Court, which upheld his conviction. He then appealed to the Supreme Court of the United States.

California Health and Safety Code § 11721 provided: "No person shall use, or be under the influence of, or be addicted to the use of narcotics, excepting when administered by or under the direction of a person licensed by the State to prescribe and administer narcotics."

== Previous Eighth Amendment rulings ==
Until the Robinson opinion, some Eighth Amendment decisions addressed whether the method of punishment was cruel and unusual. For example:

- In Wilkerson v. State of Utah (1879), the Supreme Court held that it was not a cruel and unusual punishment for the Territory of Utah to execute a criminal by shooting him, rather than the more common use of hanging. The Court said that cruel and unusual punishments include "punishments of torture" and cases "where the prisoner was drawn or dragged to the place of execution, in treason; or where he was emboweled alive, beheaded, and quartered, in high treason," as well as "public dissection in murder, and burning alive in treason committed by a female." But execution by shooting was not in the category.
- In In re Kemmler (1889), the Supreme Court held execution by electrocution not to be a cruel and unusual punishment. The Court said that "if the punishment prescribed for an offense against the laws of the State were manifestly cruel and unusual as burning at the stake, crucifixion, breaking on the wheel, or the like, it would be the duty of the courts to adjudge such penalties to be within the constitutional prohibition." But electrocution was not in that category.
- In Trop v. Dulles (1958), the Court held (5–4) that it was cruel and unusual to deprive a native-born citizen of U.S. citizenship by reason of conviction by court-martial for wartime desertion. The Court recognized that the death penalty would have been permissible, yet it ruled, "it is equally plain that the existence of the death penalty is not a license to the Government to devise any punishment short of death within the limit of its imagination." The Court held that making Trop stateless was a cruel and unusual punishment because: "The punishment strips the citizen of his status in the national and international political community. His very existence is at the sufferance of the country in which he happens to find himself."
- In Francis v. Resweber (1947), the Court held (5–4) that re-electrocuting a convicted murderer after the first attempt failed due to a defect in the State's electric chair was not cruel and unusual.

However, in Weems v. United States (1910), in which a punishment of fifteen years in irons at hard and painful labor was imposed for the crime of falsifying public records, the Court held that the penalty was cruel in its excessiveness and unusual in its character (i.e., its disproportionality). The Court quoted obiter dicta by Justice Field in dissent in O'Neil v. Vermont (1892): "the inhibition was directed not only against punishments which inflict torture, 'but against all punishments which, by their excessive length or severity, are greatly disproportioned to the offenses charged.'". Justices White and Holmes dissented on the grounds that the Eighth Amendment did not prohibit excessive or disproportionate penalties. Weems may have been the earliest "disproportionality" Eighth Amendment holding.

== Supreme Court ruling in Robinson ==
A fragmented Court reversed the state's judgment. The main opinion, by Justice Potter Stewart (joined by Justices Warren, Black and Brennan) in combination with Douglas's concurring opinion, recognized that drug addiction is a disease, and that it is unconstitutional to impose punishment for having a disease. Justice Stewart wrote that even "one day in prison for the 'crime' of having a common cold," would be cruel and unusual. Additionally, Justice Stewart's opinion, in combination with Justice Harlan's concurring opinion, held that it is unconstitutional to criminalize behavior in the absence of a guilty act, or actus reus. Justice Stewart's opinion focused on the unconstitutionality of punishing a mere status or condition, Justice Harlan's concurring opinion focused, however, on the unconstitutionality of punishing a "bare desire."

Justice Clark dissented, first, because "[p]roperly construed, the statute provides a treatment, rather than a punishment." Second, "even if interpreted as penal, the sanction of incarceration for 3 to 12 months is not unreasonable when applied to a person who has voluntarily placed himself in a condition posing a serious threat to the State."

Justice Byron White dissented. He argued, first, that "on this record, it was within the power of the State of California to confine him by criminal proceedings for the use of narcotics or for regular use amounting to habitual use." Second, the Court "has effectively removed California's power to deal effectively with the recurring case under the statute where there is ample evidence of use but no evidence of the precise location of use. Beyond this, it has cast serious doubt upon the power of any State to forbid the use of narcotics under threat of criminal punishment." Finally, he said that the Court was using "cruel and unusual punishment" as a disguise of "substantive due process":

If this case involved economic regulation, the present Court's allergy to substantive due process would surely save the statute and prevent the Court from imposing its own philosophical predilections upon state legislatures or Congress. I fail to see why the Court deems it more appropriate to write into the Constitution its own abstract notions of how best to handle the narcotics problem, for it obviously cannot match either the States or Congress in expert understanding.

== Subsequent developments ==
=== Robinson's death ===
By June 25, 1962, the day the Court handed down this decision, Robinson had been dead for more than ten months. In fact, he was dead before his appeal papers were filed in the Supreme Court. The California Attorney General's office discovered this fact upon remand and notified the Court, since this arguably mooted the case long before its decision. The Court, however, did not vacate the Robinson decision as moot. Justices Clark, Harlan, and Stewart dissented, arguing that settled precedent required dismissal for mootness.

=== Later cases in Supreme Court ===
Following the Robinson decision, the Court upheld a law criminalizing public drunkenness under Powell v. Texas, despite the argument advanced by some members of the Court that Robinson held that it was not criminal to give in to the irresistible compulsions of a "disease" (alcoholism).

In City of Grants Pass v. Johnson, the court declined to extend the argument in Robinson to laws prohibiting even homeless people from sleeping in public. In a concurring opinion, Justice Thomas said that Robinson was wrongly decided. In a dissent, three judges argued that "sleep is not a crime" and based on Robinson, it is illegal to criminalize the status of homelessness.

==== "Disproportionality" cases based on Robinson ====
The first case in which the Supreme Court applied the expanded "cruel and unusual" principle of Robinson to cases in which the penalty was considered disproportionate or excessive relative to the crime was Coker v. Georgia. The Court held that, because of the disproportionality, it was a violation of the Cruel and Unusual Punishments Clause to impose capital punishment for rape of an adult woman.

In Rummel v. Estelle, the Court held that it did not constitute cruel and unusual punishment to impose a life sentence, under a recidivist statute, upon a defendant who had been convicted, successively, of fraudulent use of a credit card to obtain $80 worth of goods or services, passing a forged check in the amount of $28.36, and obtaining $120.75 by false pretenses. The Court said that "one could argue without fear of contradiction by any decision of this Court that for crimes concededly classified and classifiable as felonies, that is, as punishable by significant terms of imprisonment in a state penitentiary, the length of the sentence actually imposed is purely a matter of legislative prerogative." Despite its unwillingness to find unconstitutional disproportionality, the Court conceded, "This is not to say that a proportionality principle would not come into play in the extreme example mentioned by the dissent, . . . if a legislature made overtime parking a felony punishable by life imprisonment."

In Solem v. Helm, a 5–4 majority set a conviction aside under the Eighth Amendment, because it was disproportionate—a sentence of life imprisonment without possibility of parole, imposed under a recidivist statute for successive offenses that included three convictions of third-degree burglary, one of obtaining money by false pretenses, one of grand larceny, one of third-offense driving while intoxicated, and one of writing a "no account" check with intent to defraud. The Court later characterized this decision as "scarcely the expression of clear and well accepted constitutional law."

In Harmelin v. Michigan, the Court examined the historical basis for the Eighth Amendment, found it based on the "cruel and unusual Punishments" provision of the English Declaration of Rights of 1689, and suggested that it is "most unlikely that the English Cruel and Unusual Punishments Clause was meant to forbid 'disproportionate' punishments." The judgment of the Court was that life imprisonment without parole for the crime of possession of more than 650 grams of cocaine did not violate the Eighth Amendment.

=== Later cases in lower courts ===
In State v. Margo, the Supreme Court of New Jersey first distinguished Robinson by stating, "In Robinson it was held that a statute of California which made it a criminal offense to 'be addicted to the use of narcotics' inflicted cruel and unusual punishment in violation of the Eighth and Fourteenth Amendments. But Margo "was convicted of being under the influence of a narcotic drug, heroin." Margo's conviction was not for addiction, as was Robinson's. The court then declared:

We see no reason why, if a person may constitutionally be punished for using a drug, he may not be punished for being under its `influence,' for realistically the use of a drug offends society's interests precisely because of its baleful influence upon the person and the harm to which that influence may lead. In other words, being under the influence of a drug is itself antisocial behavior. It is not some latent or passive proclivity; it is an active state, voluntarily induced and laden with a present capacity for further injury to society. We think society may use the criminal process to protect itself against that harm. Robinson is not to the contrary.

The court therefore unanimously affirmed the conviction.

In Salas v. State, the defendant was convicted of being "unlawfully under the influence of a narcotic drug." The court affirmed the conviction because it considered the Robinson holding limited to addiction. Salas appealed to the Supreme Court, but the appeal was dismissed "for want of substantial Federal question."

In State v. Brown, the Arizona Supreme Court (en banc) refused to hold the state without power to criminalize drug use. It said Robinson applied only to criminalizing addiction, not use or being under the influence. Here, "Brown was convicted of being 'under the influence of' a narcotic drug.'"

== See also ==
- List of United States Supreme Court cases, volume 370
