= Ewing v. California =

- Supreme Court of the United States

Argued November 5, 2002 Decided March 5, 2003
- Full case name: Gary Albert Ewing, Petitioner v. California
- Docket no.: 01-6978
- Citations: 538 U.S. 11 (more) 123 S. Ct. 1179; 155 L. Ed. 2d 108; 2003 U.S. LEXIS 1952

Case history
- Prior: Defendant convicted in Los Angeles County Superior Court; conviction affirmed by California Court of Appeal; California Supreme Court declined review, and the U.S. Supreme Court granted certiorari, 535 U.S. 969 (2002).

Holding
- California's three strikes law does not violate the Eighth Amendment prohibition against cruel and unusual punishment.

Court membership
- Chief Justice William Rehnquist Associate Justices John P. Stevens · Sandra Day O'Connor; Antonin Scalia · Anthony Kennedy; David Souter · Clarence Thomas; Ruth Bader Ginsburg · Stephen Breyer

Case opinions
- Plurality: O'Connor, joined by Rehnquist, Kennedy
- Concurrence: Scalia (in judgment)
- Concurrence: Thomas (in judgment)
- Dissent: Stevens, joined by Souter, Ginsburg, Breyer
- Dissent: Breyer, joined by Stevens, Souter, Ginsburg

Laws applied
- U.S. Const. amend. VIII; Cal. Penal Code § 667

Ewing v. California, 538 U.S. 11 (2003), is one of two cases upholding a sentence imposed under California's three strikes law against a challenge that it constituted cruel and unusual punishment in violation of the Eighth Amendment. As in its prior decision in Harmelin v. Michigan, the United States Supreme Court could not agree on the precise reasoning to uphold the sentence. But, with the decision in Ewing and the companion case Lockyer v. Andrade, the Court effectively foreclosed criminal defendants from arguing that their non-capital sentences were disproportional to the crime they had committed.

Ewing was represented in the Court by Quin Denvir. The Attorney General of California argued for the State of California. Michael Chertoff argued on behalf of the United States as amicus curiae.

== Facts ==
Viewed separately from his criminal history, the crime Gary Ewing committed in this case is relatively benign. In 2000, he stole three golf clubs worth $399 each from the pro shop of the El Segundo Golf Course in El Segundo, California. He slipped them down the leg of his pants, and a shop employee called the police when he noticed Ewing limping out of the pro shop.

Ewing was charged with and convicted of felony grand theft of personal property. Under California law, felony grand theft is a "wobbler," meaning that both the prosecutor and the trial judge have discretion to reduce classification of the seriousness of the crime to a misdemeanor. Although Ewing asked the trial court to exercise its discretion in this way, thus making him ineligible for sentencing under the three strikes law, the trial judge declined to do so, in part based on Ewing's extensive criminal history:

- Ewing committed his first crime in 1984 when he was 22 years old. He pleaded guilty to theft, and received a six-month suspended sentence.
- In 1988 Ewing was convicted of felony grand auto theft and sentenced to a year in jail and three years' probation.
- In 1990, Ewing was convicted of petty theft and sentenced to 60 days in jail and three years' probation.
- In 1992, Ewing was convicted of battery and sentenced to 30 days in jail.
- Sometime in the first nine months of 1993, Ewing was convicted of burglary, possession of drug paraphernalia, appropriating lost property, unlawful possession of a firearm, and trespassing.
- In October and November 1993, Ewing committed his most serious crimes to date—a string of burglaries and robbery at apartment complexes in Long Beach, California, where he made off with money, electronics, and credit cards.
- In December 1993 Ewing was arrested on the premises of another Long Beach apartment complex. Police found on his person a knife used in the prior robbery, along with a glass cocaine pipe. He was convicted of one count of first-degree robbery and three counts of residential burglary, and sentenced to nine years in prison.

Ewing was paroled in 1999, 10 months before he stole the golf clubs from the pro shop in El Segundo. At sentencing on the golf club theft, the judge classified the 1993 burglaries and robbery as "two strikes" and imposed the 25-to-life sentence under California's three strikes law. Ewing appealed his conviction to the California Court of Appeal, which rejected his challenge that the 25-year sentence was grossly disproportional to the crime of stealing $1200 worth of goods in a non-violent incident. The California Supreme Court denied review.

== Plurality decision ==
Justice O'Connor wrote an opinion for herself, Chief Justice Rehnquist, and Justice Kennedy. Under the Eighth Amendment, a narrow proportionality principle applies to non-capital sentences. Before Ewing, the Court had from time to time examined lengthy sentences imposed for relatively minor crimes. In Rummel v. Estelle, the Court upheld a life sentence for obtaining $120.75 by false pretenses imposed on a three-time offender under Texas's recidivist statute. In Solem v. Helm, the Court struck down a life without parole (LWOP) sentence imposed on a defendant who had committed a seventh non-violent felony. Most recently, in Harmelin v. Michigan, the Court upheld a life without parole sentence imposed on a first-time offender convicted of possession of more than 650 grams of cocaine. Against this backdrop of case law, O'Connor said that the gross disproportionality principle contained in the Eighth Amendment would require striking down only an extreme noncapital sentence, such as a life sentence for overtime parking.

Three-strikes laws, O'Connor observed, represented a new trend in criminal sentencing. "These laws respond to widespread public concerns about crime by targeting the class of offenders who pose the greatest threat to public safety: career criminals." Such laws were a "deliberate policy choice" on the part of legislatures to isolate those who have "repeatedly engaged in serious or violent criminal behavior" from the rest of society in order to protect public safety. For O'Connor, the desire to punish repeat criminals more harshly was "no pretext" for the legitimate policy choice that the three-strikes law implemented. Such laws serve the valid penological goals of incapacitation and deterrence. Although California's three-strikes law may have generated some controversy, "we do not sit as a superlegislature to second-guess" the policy choices made by particular states. "It is enough that the State of California has a reasonable basis for believing that dramatically enhanced sentences for habitual felons advances the goals of its criminal justice system in any substantial way."

She noted that Ewing's crime was not simply that of stealing three golf clubs—it was stealing three golf clubs after being convicted of two violent or serious felonies. "In weighing the gravity of Ewing's offense, we must place on the scales not only his current felony, but also his long history of felony recidivism. Any other approach would fail to accord proper deference to the policy judgments that find expression in the legislature's choice of sanctions." Ewing's sentence might be long, but it "reflects a rational judgment, entitled to deference, that offenders who have committed serious or violent felonies and who continue to commit felonies must be incapacitated." For this reason, O'Connor reasoned that Ewing's 25-years-to-life sentence did not violate the Eighth Amendment.

Justice Scalia was willing to accept that the Eighth Amendment contained a gross disproportionality requirement "if I felt I could intelligently apply it." However, because a criminal sentence can have many justifications—not simply retribution, a goal to which proportionality is inherently linked— he thought it was impossible to intelligently apply a proportionality requirement to non-capital sentences. Even so, Justice Scalia concurred in the judgment that Ewing's sentence was constitutional.

Justice Thomas believed that the Eighth Amendment contained no proportionality principle at all, and concurred in the judgment.

== Dissents ==
Justice Stevens explained that a proportionality principle for non-capital sentences was compatible with the Eighth Amendment. After all, judges must determine the proportionality of fines, bail, and death sentences. There should be no reason why these lesser and greater forms of punishment should be subject to a proportionality requirement, but not the length of a prison sentence.

Judges have historically exercised much discretion in criminal sentencing. Much of this discretion had been conferred by legislatures, who fixed criminal penalties over very broad ranges. "It was not unheard of for a statute to authorize a sentence ranging from one year to life, for example." In order to exercise this discretion, judges had to take into account all the goals of punishment in fixing a proportional sentence. Stevens believed that the Eighth Amendment could support such determination of proportionality. "I think it clear that the Eighth Amendment's prohibition of cruel and unusual punishments expresses a broad and basic proportionality principle that takes into account all of the justifications for penal sanctions."

Justice Breyer conceded that successful proportionality challenges to criminal sentences should be rare, but argued that Ewing's sentence could be successfully challenged as disproportional. For Breyer, three characteristics of a sentence bear on whether it is proportional: the length of the sentence in real time, the conduct that triggered the sentence, and the offender's criminal history. Although Ewing was a recidivist, his present crime was not violent, and so he should not have been sentenced as harshly as a recidivist who had committed yet another violent crime. The experience of some federal judges, as described by data aggregated by the United States Sentencing Commission, suggested that Ewing would not have been treated so harshly under federal sentencing law. Finally, the fact that Ewing's sentence would have been the same if he had been convicted of a violent crime, like rape or murder, suggested it was too harsh a sentence for a shoplifter, even a recidivist shoplifter like Ewing. "Outside the California three strikes context, Ewing's recidivist sentence is virtually unique in its harshness for his offense of conviction, and by a considerable degree."

== See also ==
- List of United States Supreme Court cases, volume 538
- List of United States Supreme Court cases
