= Disciplinary punishment =

Disciplinary punishment or disciplinary action is a punishment for violations of discipline. It may refer to:

- A punishment by the disciplinary procedure in a deliberative assembly
- Disciplinary punishment (Russia), concept in the law of Russia
- Non-judicial punishment in the United States Armed Forces
- Disciplinary sanctions and punishment in penal facilities

== See also ==
- School discipline
- School corporal punishment in the United States
