= Lockyer v. Andrade =

- Supreme Court of the United States

Argued November 5, 2002 Decided March 5, 2003
- Full case name: Bill Lockyer, Attorney General of California, v. Leandro Andrade
- Citations: 538 U.S. 63 (more) 123 S. Ct. 1166; 155 L. Ed. 2d 144

Case history
- Prior: Defendant convicted, Los Angeles County Superior Court; conviction affirmed, California Court of Appeal. Then defendant filed a petition for a writ of habeas corpus in the U.S. district court for the Central District of California. The petition was denied, but the decision was reversed by the Ninth Circuit Court of Appeals, Andrade v. Att'y Gen., 270 F.3d 743 (9th Cir. 2001). The Supreme Court granted certiorari, 535 U.S. 969 (2002).

Holding
- The Ninth Circuit misapplied AEDPA's "unreasonable application" standard by equating it with "clear error".

Court membership
- Chief Justice William Rehnquist Associate Justices John P. Stevens · Sandra Day O'Connor; Antonin Scalia · Anthony Kennedy; David Souter · Clarence Thomas; Ruth Bader Ginsburg · Stephen Breyer

Case opinions
- Majority: O'Connor, joined by Rehnquist, Scalia, Kennedy, Thomas
- Dissent: Souter, joined by Stevens, Ginsburg, Breyer

Laws applied
- U.S. Const. amend. VIII; 28 U.S.C. § 2254(d)(1); Cal. Penal Code § 667

Lockyer v. Andrade, 538 U.S. 63 (2003), decided the same day as Ewing v. California (a case with a similar subject matter), held that there would be no relief by means of a petition for a writ of habeas corpus for a claim that a sentence imposed under California's three strikes law was an unconstitutionally disproportionate punishment prohibited by the Eighth Amendment's prohibition of cruel and unusual punishments. The decision weakened the applicability of proportionality review for prison sentences.

== Legal background ==
=== Recidivist sentencing laws ===
It is an established and uncontroversial practice of courts to impose harsher sentences for repeat offenders with prior felony convictions. Many states have enacted three-strike laws imposing an automatic life sentence for a "third strike" (third felony conviction). However, the "three-strike law" enacted by California after the murder of Polly Klaas has been criticized for its harshness.

Unlike other states, California did not require the "third strike" to be a violent felony. Polly Klaas's father was opposed to non-violent third strikes: "I've had my car broken into and my radio stolen and I've had my daughter murdered, and I know the difference."

In 2000, the Supreme Court of the United States granted certiorari for two cases involving California's three-strike law. Lockyer v. Andrade was decided on statutory grounds applying the AEDPA, and the companion case Ewing v. California, decided the same day, upheld the California three-strike law on constitutional grounds.

=== Proportionality review for prison sentences ===
The Supreme Court has consistently held since Weems v. United States that the Eighth Amendment prohibits disproportionate punishments. This principle of proportionality has roots in the common law and the founding era. However, the application to prison sentences has been unclear.

In 1980, William Rehnquist held in Rummel v. Estelle that the length of prison sentences was "purely a matter of legislative prerogative". However, in the 1983 Solem v. Helm, proportionality review was applied to hold that a life sentence was a disproportionate punishment for bouncing a check, even with six prior convictions for non-violent offenses. Although Chief Justice Warren E. Burger argued in dissent that the Solem decision was inconsistent with Rummel, the majority held it was not.

Writing for the Court in Harmelin v. Michigan, Justice Anthony Kennedy said the possession of over 650 grams of cocaine was "as serious and violent as the crime of felony murder without specific intent to kill" and, citing Rummel, stated that the court has never invalidated on constitutional grounds a mandatory life sentence without parole sentence for "a crime as severe as this one".

=== Antiterrorism and Effective Death Penalty Act ===
In 1996 Antiterrorism and Effective Death Penalty Act made major changes to the federal habeas statute. Under 28 U.S.C. § 2254(d), the authority of federal courts to even hear a claim that had been "adjudicated on the merits" by a state court was limited to decisions that "involved an unreasonable application of, clearly established federal law". This provision conflicted with Ninth Circuit precedents that required federal courts to review habeas claims de novo before applying AEDPA's standards to decide the claim.

== Trial of Leandro Andrade ==
On November 4, 1995, Leandro Andrade, a nine-year Army veteran and father of three, stole five children's videotapes from a K-Mart store in Ontario, California. Two weeks later, he stole four children's videotapes from a different K-Mart store in Montclair, California. Andrade had been in and out of the state and federal prison systems since 1982. He developed a drug addiction while serving in the Army, and by the time of these two crimes in 1995, he had committed multiple burglaries for which he was sentenced to two and a half years in prison. Since 1994, non-violent felonies can serve as a third "strike" under California's three-strikes law and expose the defendant to a mandatory sentence of 25 years to life in prison. Andrade's minor shoplifting was a felony under California state law because he had prior convictions.

The trial court denied Andrade's request to classify the two petty theft charges as misdemeanors, and Andrade was ultimately convicted of the two felony theft charges. As a result of his prior convictions, Andrade was sentenced to two consecutive terms of 25 years to life in prison each. The California Court of Appeal applied Rummel and affirmed Andreade's conviction and sentence. The California Supreme Court declined review.

== Ninth Circuit ==
Andrade next filed a petition for habeas corpus in the United States District Court for the Central District of California asking the court to evaluate the constitutionality of his sentence under the Eighth Amendment to the United States Constitution. The district court denied the petition.

The Ninth Circuit granted a certificate of appealability for Andrade's Eighth Amendment claim. Finding that the state court's decision was an "unreasonable application of clearly established Supreme Court law" and "irreconcilable with ... Solem", the Ninth ruled in favor of Andrade. The State of California asked the U.S. Supreme Court to review the Ninth Circuit's decision, and it agreed to do so.

== Supreme Court ==
Erwin Chemerinsky argued Andrade's case before the Supreme Court.

=== Majority opinion ===
Because of the Antiterrorism and Effective Death Penalty Act, the Court could not grant relief unless the decision of the state courts to uphold Andrade's sentence was "contrary to, or an unreasonable application of, clearly established Federal law, as determined by the Supreme Court of the United States." This meant that the Court's first task was to identify what that "clearly established" law was. The Court examined its prior holdings, and found three relevant cases: Rummel v. Estelle, Solem v. Helm, and Harmelin v. Michigan. Although these precedents were not a "model of clarity," the Court concluded that a "gross disproportionality principle is applicable to sentences for terms of years," but that the "precise contours" of this principle were unclear and applied only in the "exceedingly rare and extreme case."

In Solem, the sentence did not allow for parole, and the Court had held it was cruel and unusual. Applying Williams v. Taylor, the Ninth Circuit found this was "materially indistinguishable" from the facts of Andrade's case. The Supreme Court disagreed that the facts were "materially indistinguishable" from Solem because Andrade's sentence was not life without parole.

In Rummel, the sentence did allow for parole, and the Court had held it was not cruel and unusual. In this case, like in Rummel, Andrade retained the opportunity for parole, even if that possibility was remote.

The Court found that the Ninth Circuit had applied a "clear error" standard that substituted its own judgment where the AEDPA standard mandated deference to state courts. Because the "precise contours" of the "gross proportionality principle" are "unclear", the Court concluded that the state court's decision was not an "unreasonable application" of Supreme Court precedent.

=== Souter's dissent ===
Justice David Souter protested that Andrade's criminal history and triggering offenses were less severe than those of the defendant in Ewing, yet Andrade received a harsher sentence. He argued that the sentence in this case was indistinguishable from that in Solem, and thus required the Court to grant relief. "Andrade, like the defendant in Solem, was a repeat offender who committed theft of trifling value, some $150, and their criminal records are comparable, including burglary (though Andrade's were residential), with no violent crimes or crimes against the person." Because Andrade was 37 at the time of the offenses in this case, the cumulative 50-years-to-life sentence was effectively life without parole. The only way Souter could distinguish the sentence in this case and the sentence in Solem was "to reject the practical equivalence of a life sentence without parole and one with parole eligibility at 87."

Moreover, the fact that California's three-strikes law embodied one penological theory — the theory of incapacitation — facilitated judicial review of sentences imposed under it with reference to the requirements of the Eighth Amendment. The incapacitation theory could not, Souter argued, justify sentencing a person to 25 more years in prison for an identical, trifling crime committed two weeks after the first. "Since the defendant's condition has not changed between the two closely related thefts, the incapacitation penalty is not open to the simple arithmetic of multiplying the punishment by two, without resulting in gross disproportion even under the State's chosen benchmark." For Souter, the sentence in this case presented one of those rare cases that the Eighth Amendment allowed the Court to set it aside.

== Impact ==
One impact of the decision was that it allowed states to impose life sentences for non-violent "third strikes" such as shoplifting and possessing small quantities of marijuana. Erwin Chemerinsky said "[the] bottom line after Ewing and Andrade is that there is little in the way of proportionality review for prison sentences".

Ninth Circuit judge Stephen Reinhardt said the decision was the first of a series of Supreme Court precedents that restricted what the circuit courts could apply as "clearly established Federal law" under AEDPA.

== See also ==
- List of United States Supreme Court cases, volume 538
- List of United States Supreme Court cases
