= Leandro Andrade =

Leandro Andrade may refer to:

- Leandro Andrade, involved in Lockyer v. Andrade
- Leandro Andrade (footballer) (born 1999), Cape Verdean footballer
