= Wallace Wilkerson =

American convicted murderer

- Born: c. 1834; Quincy, Illinois, U.S.
- Died: May 16, 1879 (aged 45); Provo, Utah Territory, U.S.
- Cause of death: Exsanguination caused by botched firing squad execution
- Occupations: Stockman, horse breaker, military drummer
- Status: Executed (May 16, 1879; 147 years ago)
- Conviction: Murder – 1877
- Penalty: Death

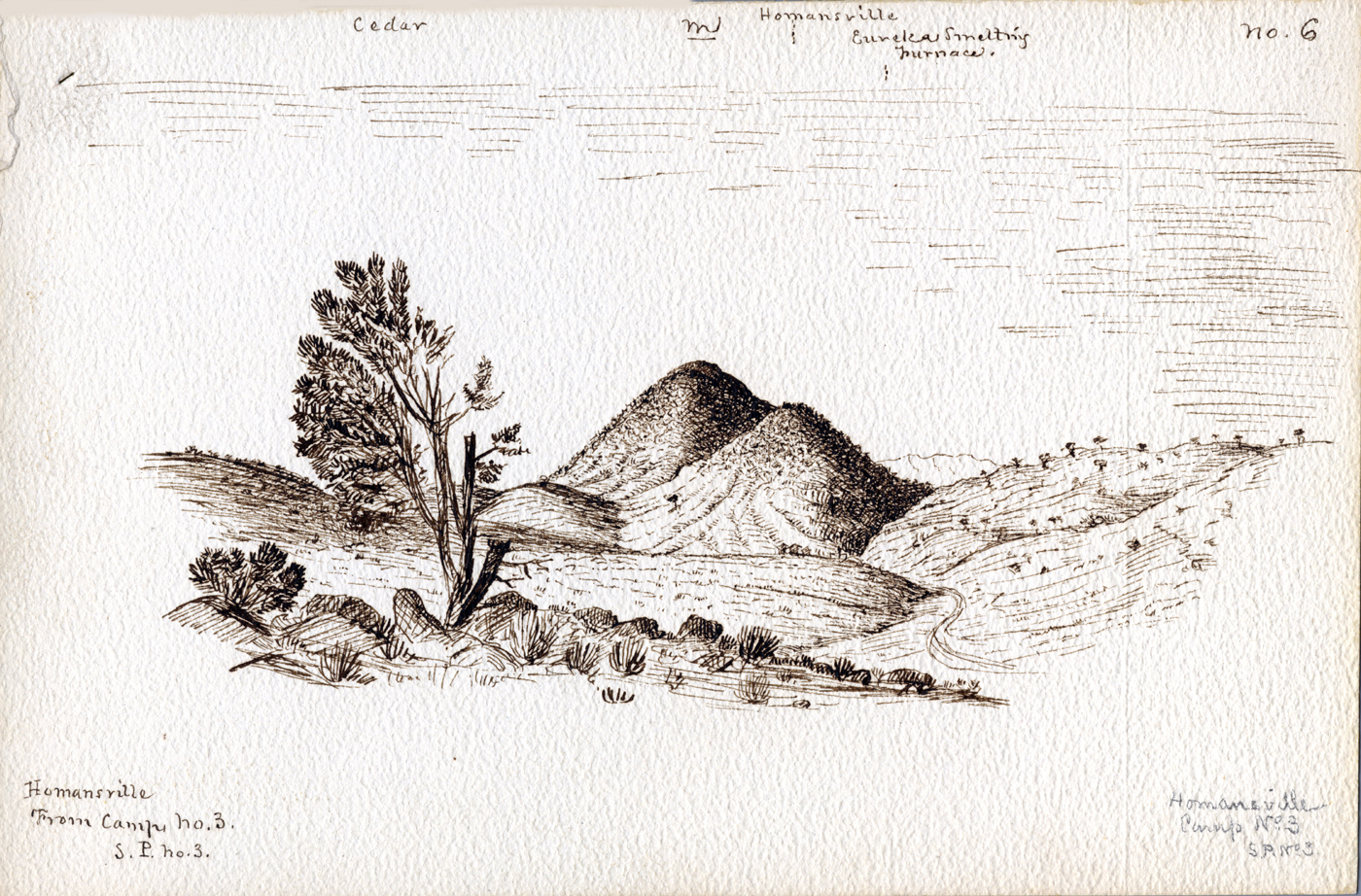
1872 surveyor's sketch of Homansville, where Wilkerson worked in Utah Territory.

Wallace Wilkerson (c. 1834 – May 16, 1879) was an American stockman who was sentenced to death by the Territory of Utah for the murder of William Baxter. Wilkerson professed his innocence, but chose to die by firing squad over hanging or decapitation. The execution was botched; Wilkerson took up to 27 minutes to die after the firing squad missed his heart.

His case, Wilkerson v. Utah, was heard by the Supreme Court of the United States and continues to be cited in present-day case law involving cruel and unusual punishment.

== Background ==
Wallace Wilkerson was born in 1834 in Quincy, Illinois, to a Mormon family. At the age of eight, he moved with his parents to the Territory of Utah. At the age of seventeen, Wilkerson was working as a stockman and horse breaker. He enlisted several times in the military, once serving as a drummer in San Francisco, California.

In 1877, Wilkerson lived at Payson in Utah Territory and worked with his brothers at Homansville. He frequented a saloon nearby at Eureka. The bartender, William Baxter, called Wilkerson a "California Mormon", which was considered a slur, and once used a six shooter to break up a conflict between Wilkerson and another patron in the saloon.

== Death of William Baxter ==
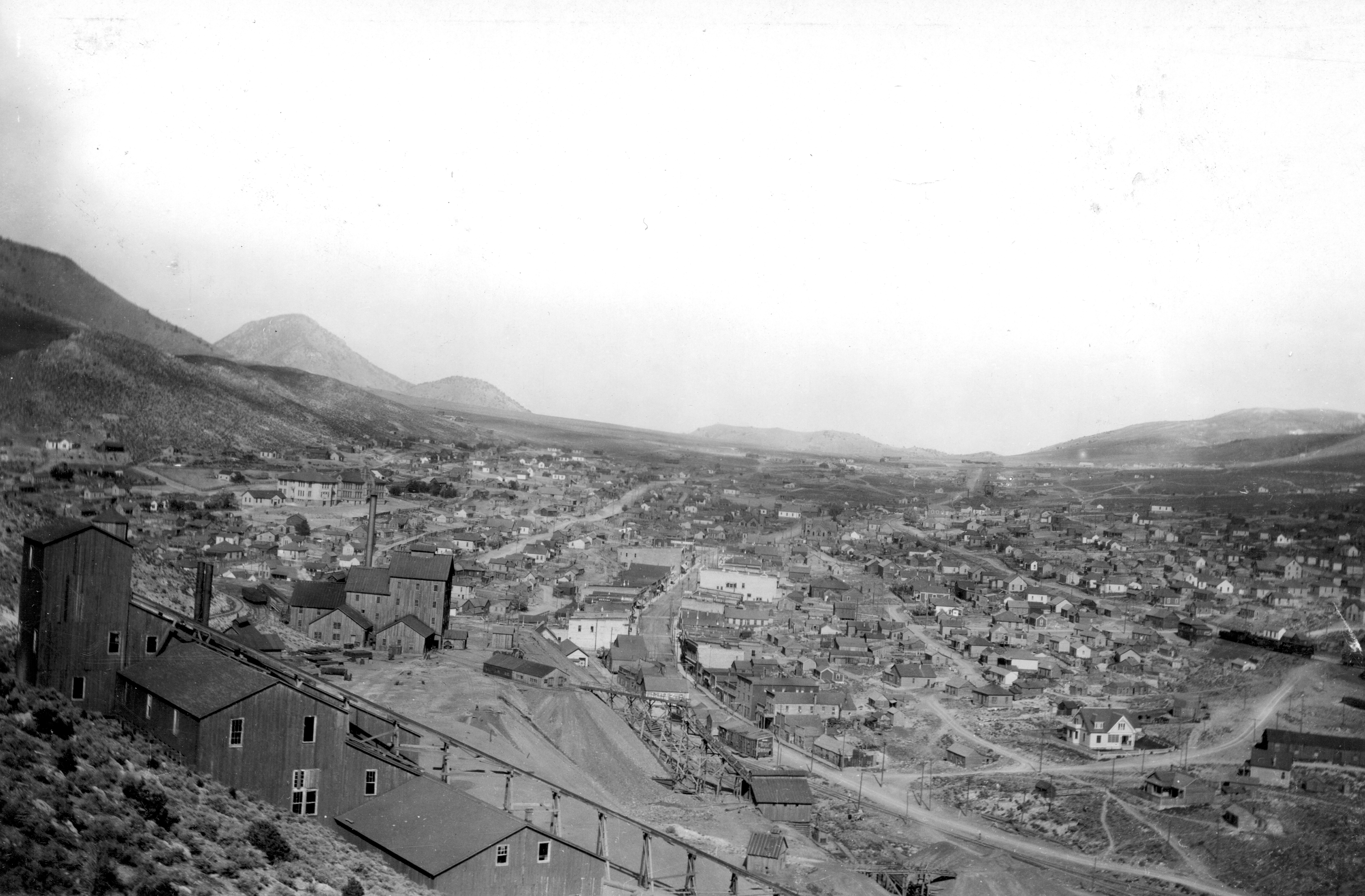
Tintic District at Eureka, Utah, in 1911.

On June 11, 1877, Baxter stopped at a saloon owned by James Hightower in the Tintic Mining District while on the way to Homansville. He met Wilkerson and the two began to play a card game of cribbage for money. An argument broke out between the men over accusations of cheating. Baxter attempted to back out of the struggle, but was fatally shot in the forehead and temple by Wilkerson, who then fled. The next morning, the coroner examined the body of Baxter, who was determined to have been unarmed at the time of the shooting. Authorities quickly captured Wilkerson and kept him under guard in Goshen to prevent him from being lynched.

=== Trial ===
Wilkerson was indicted for premeditated murder by a grand jury. On September 29, 1877, he pleaded not guilty and was placed in the Utah County jail. Wilkerson's trial at the First District Court of Utah Territory commenced on November 22. He was convicted by the jury two days later. On November 28, state district judge P. H. Emerson sentenced Wilkerson to death and set an execution date of December 14, 1877. Wilkerson chose to be executed by firing squad instead of the other options of hanging or decapitation that were legal in the territory at the time.

=== Appeals ===
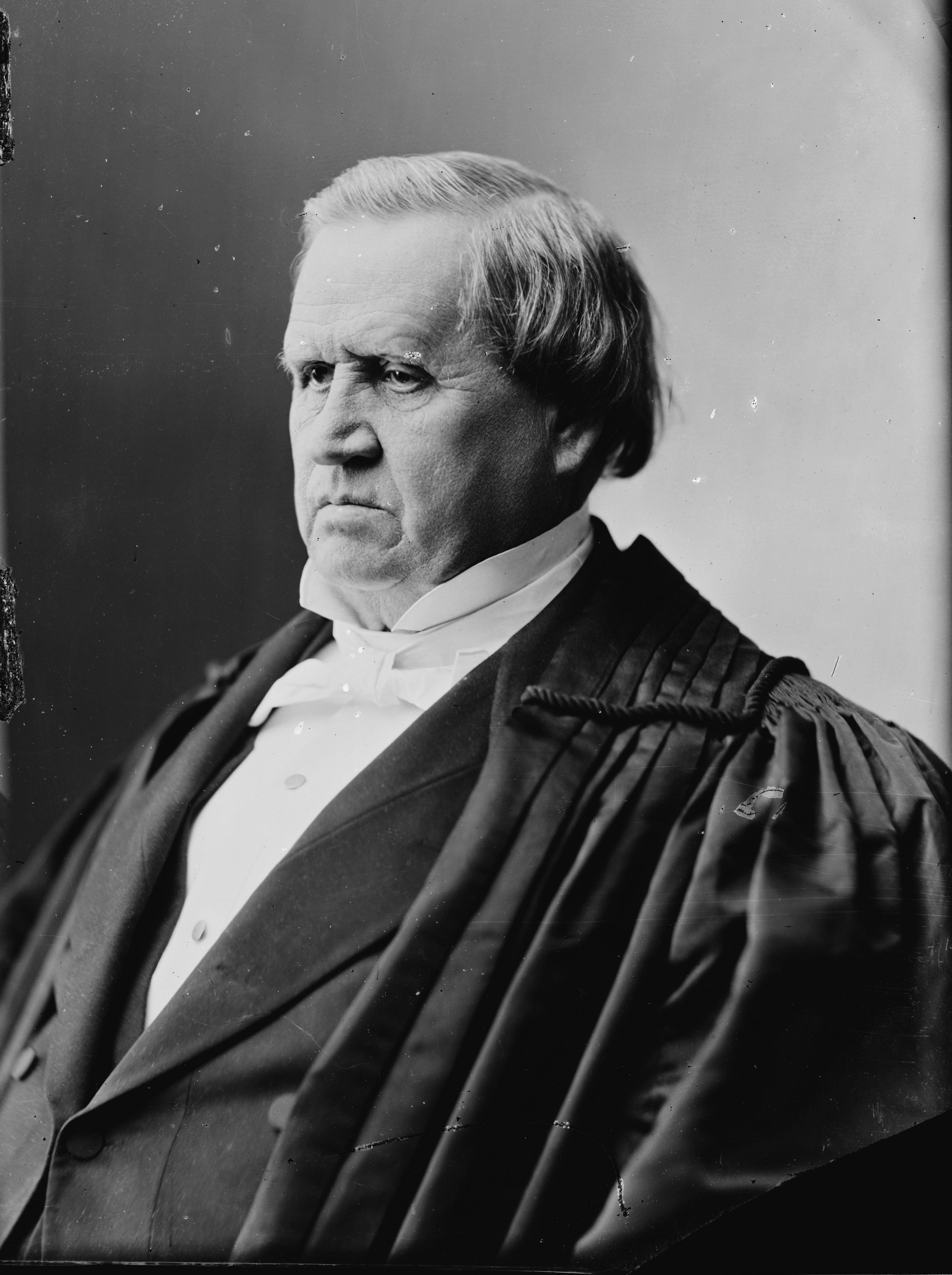
Justice Nathan Clifford

A stay of execution was issued after Wilkerson's attorney filed an appeal. The Supreme Court of Utah Territory denied the appeal in January 1878. On January 8, 1879, attorneys E. D. Hoge and P. L. Williams submitted a writ of error that raised an argument of cruel and unusual punishment on behalf of Wilkerson to the Supreme Court of the United States during its October 1878 term. On March 17, 1879, Justice Nathan Clifford delivered the U.S. Supreme Court ruling that upheld the verdict.

Cruel and unusual punishments are forbidden by the Constitution, but the authorities referred to are quite sufficient to show that the punishment of shooting as a mode of executing the death penalty for the crime of murder in the first degree is not included in that category, within the meaning of the eighth amendment.

— U.S. Supreme Court, Wilkerson v. Utah (March 1879)

== Execution ==
Wilkerson was executed in Provo, Utah.

On May 15, 1879, Wilkerson was transferred from Salt Lake City to a jail in Provo. Wilkerson spent his last day together with his wife until half an hour before the execution. He declined visits by the clergy. Wilkerson was brought out of his cell by Sheriff John Turner, a deputy, and U.S. Marshal Shaughnessy. He was dressed in black with a white felt hat and a cigar which he kept through the execution. Wilkerson gave a farewell speech thanking the law enforcement officers and shook hands with some of the 25 people present in the jail yard in Provo. About 200 spectators were estimated to have gathered outside. Wilkerson stated that he bore no grudge against anyone except a witness that he accused of committing perjury at his trial. Some of the witnesses of the execution recalled that he appeared to be drunk.

Wilkerson was seated on a chair at a corner of the jail yard about 30 feet away from the shooters and declined to be blindfolded. He insisted that restraints were unnecessary, stating: "I give you my word... I intend to die like a man, looking my executioners right in the eye." A white three-inch paper target was pinned on Wilkerson's chest over his heart. Wilkerson yelled, "[A]im for my heart, Marshal!"

At approximately noon on May 16, 1879, the marshal signaled the men who were concealed in a shed to shoot. When Wilkerson heard the end of the count, he stiffened up in the chair, unwittingly moving the target. The bullets missed Wilkerson's heart, one of them shattering his arm and the rest hitting his torso. He leapt off the chair and screamed, "Oh, my God! My God! They've missed it!" Four doctors rushed to Wilkerson, who was struggling and gasping on the ground. Officials were concerned at one point that they would have to shoot him again, but he was pronounced dead 27 minutes later, having bled to death. According to some accounts, he appeared to have died in about 15 minutes.

=== Aftermath ===
Wilkerson's body was carried to an office at the county courthouse. After being washed and placed in a coffin covered in black, the body was returned to Wilkerson's wife to be taken to Payson for burial.

The Deseret News, published at the time by Brigham Young Jr., the son of deceased Latter Day Saint movement leader Brigham Young, proclaimed that "divine law has been executed and human law honored" because Wilkerson "atoned for that deed as far as it is possible so to do by the pouring out of his own blood." However, the Ogden Junction criticized the event by printing: "...the French guillotine never fails."

In the April 2008 decision of Baze v. Rees, U.S. Supreme Court Justice Clarence Thomas cited the case of Wilkerson v. Utah in affirming that Kentucky's method of execution by lethal injection did not constitute cruel and unusual punishment.

== See also ==
- Blood atonement
- Capital punishment in Utah
- Capital punishment in the United States
