= Indiscipline =

Indiscipline may refer to:

- "Indiscipline", a song by King Crimson from the 1981 album Discipline
- "Indiscipline", an episode of the animated television series Jason and the Heroes of Mount Olympus
- Indiscipline, a 2000 project of the Belgian arts group Roomade

== See also ==
- Discipline (disambiguation)
