= Disciplinary punishment (Russia) =

A disciplinary punishment or disciplinary action (Russian: Дисциплина́рное взыска́ние / наказание) is a punishment for the violation of discipline in various areas according to the corresponding regulations. in Russia, the following types disciplinary actions are regulated:

- in military, in accordance with the Disciplinary Charter
- in state government, for civil servants
- for employees, for violations of labor law/discipline
- in penal institutions, for convicts

== History ==
In Russian Empire the concept of disciplinary power was decentralized, i.e., there was no general-purpose code for disciplinary poser, and in was regulated by various codes in the various areas of subordination.

== See also ==
- Disciplinary sanctions and punishment in penal facilities
