= Disciplinary sanctions and punishment in penal facilities =

Disciplinary sanctions and punishment in penal facilities are punishments for violation of discipline in penal facilities, typically delivered by penal facility officials. They vary depending on the country, historical period, and facility type.

== United States ==
In prisons of the United States, the following types of disciplinary punishment are reported by the ACLU: physical punishment, punitive segregation, losing visitation privileges, restricting visitation privileges, monetary restitution for property damage, water deprivation, reducing shower privileges and extending sentences. Reportedly, convicts may not have received a disciplinary hearing or may not receive a fair hearing.

The U.S. Supreme Court provided four criteria to test whether prison regulations violate the U.S. Constitution (Turner v. Safley, 1987):

- whether the regulation has a "valid, rational connection" to a legitimate governmental interest
- whether alternative means are open to inmates to exercise the asserted right
- what impact an accommodation of the right would have on guards and inmates and prison resources
- whether there are "ready alternatives" to the regulation

Many prisons have various "levels of discipline", with accordingly varied punishments.

Courts found punishments by physical abuse or degrading conditions of confinement to be unconstitutional. (Jackson v. Bishop, 1968).

Prisoners may challenge their punishments in courts.

== See also ==
- Disciplinary punishment (Russia)
