= Browning-Ferris Industries of Vermont, Inc. v. Kelco Disposal, Inc. =

Browning-Ferris Industries v. Kelco Disposal
- Supreme Court of the United States

Argued April 18, 1989 Decided June 26, 1989
- Full case name: Browning-Ferris Industries of Vt., Inc., el al. v. Kelco Disposal, Inc., et al.
- Docket no.: 88-556
- Citations: 492 U.S. 257 (more) 109 S. Ct. 2909; 106 L. Ed. 2d 219

Case history
- Prior: Appeal from the United States Court of Appeals for the Second Circuit

Holding
- Awards of punitive damages in civil cases are not subject to the Eighth Amendment's prohibition on excessive fines when the United States is not a party.

Court membership
- Chief Justice William Rehnquist Associate Justices William J. Brennan Jr. · Byron White; Thurgood Marshall · Harry Blackmun; John P. Stevens · Sandra Day O'Connor; Antonin Scalia · Anthony Kennedy

Case opinions
- Majority: Blackmun, joined by Rehnquist, Brennan, White, Marshall, Scalia, Kennedy
- Concurrence: Brennan, joined by Marshall
- Concur/dissent: O'Connor, joined by Stevens

Browning-Ferris Industries v. Kelco Disposal, 492 U.S. 257 (1989), was a case in which the Supreme Court of the United States held that the Eighth Amendment's prohibition of unreasonable fines does not apply to punitive-damage awards in civil cases when the United States is not a party.

== Prior history ==
Browning-Ferris Industries (BFI) had been the dominant provider of roll-off trash collection services in the Burlington, Vermont market since it entered the roll-off market in 1976. Joseph Kelley was a district manager for BFI until 1980, when he left to found his own company, Kelco Disposal. By 1982, Kelco had garnered over 40% of the roll-off market; in that year, BFI began a campaign of predatory pricing, which continued for several months, with the intent of driving Kelco out of the business. In 1985, BFI sold their Burlington operations to another company.

In 1984, Kelco filed suit in the United States District Court for the District of Vermont alleging that BFI had violated the Sherman Antitrust Act. Kelco also claimed, as an alternative state-law cause of action, that BFI interfered with its contracts with its customers. In the subsequent jury trial, BFI was found liable on both claims. In a separate one-day trial on the damages, the jury settled on compensatory damages of $51,146, and punitive damages of $6 million. The trial court then awarded Kelco treble damages and attorney's fees on the anti-trust claim, but awarded $6,066,082.74 on the alternative state tort claim, so further action proceeded on the basis of the higher award.

BFI appealed the judgment to the Second Circuit Court of Appeals, and raised the issue of the excessive fines clause. The Second Circuit affirmed the trial court's decision on both liability and damages, finding for the sake of argument that the jury's punitive-damage award was not excessive whether or not the Eighth Amendment applied to this case. The Supreme Court granted certiorari to consider the specific question of whether the excessive fines clause applies to civil cases involving purely private parties.

== See also ==
- List of United States Supreme Court cases, volume 492
- List of United States Supreme Court cases
- Lists of United States Supreme Court cases by volume
- List of United States Supreme Court cases by the Rehnquist Court
