= Maryland v. West Virginia =

- Supreme Court of the United States

Argued November 2–4, 1909 Decided February 21, 1910
- Full case name: State of Maryland v. State of West Virginia
- Citations: 217 U.S. 1 (more) 30 S. Ct. 268; 54 L. Ed. 645; 1910 U.S. LEXIS 1942

Case history
- Subsequent: Maryland v. West Virginia, 225 U.S. 1 (1912)

Holding
- West Virginia's border extends to the low-water mark on the south bank of the Potomac River; Boundary disputes should be adjusted according to prescription and equity to least disturb private rights and titles

Court membership
- Chief Justice Melville Fuller Associate Justices John M. Harlan · David J. Brewer; Edward D. White · Joseph McKenna; Oliver W. Holmes Jr. · William R. Day; William H. Moody · Horace H. Lurton

Case opinion
- Majority: Day, joined by unanimous

Maryland v. West Virginia, 217 U.S. 1 (1910), is a 9-to-0 ruling by the United States Supreme Court which held that the boundary between the American states of Maryland and West Virginia is the south bank of the North Branch Potomac River. The decision also affirmed criteria for adjudicating boundary disputes between states, which said that decisions should be based on the specific facts of the case, applying the principles of law and equity in such a way that least disturbs private rights and title to land.

== Background ==
On June 20, 1632, Charles I, King of England, made a land grant in North America to Cecilius Calvert, 2nd Baron Baltimore which became the Province of Maryland (later the state of Maryland). This grant set the boundary of Maryland at the low-water mark of the southern bank of the Potomac River. On September 27, 1688, King James II made a land grant in North America to Thomas Colepeper, 2nd Baron Colepeper which became the Colony of Virginia (later the commonwealth of Virginia). This grant designated "the Potomac River" as the boundary of Virginia. The conflicting grants led to a long-running border dispute between Maryland and Virginia. The two states settled navigational and riparian water rights in a compact in 1785, but the boundary dispute continued.

Maryland entered into a separate dispute with Virginia regarding the placement of its true southern boundary in the west. The land grant given to Lord Baltimore stated that the Potomac River to its headwaters was to be the southern boundary of Maryland. From that point, a north-south meridian set the state's western border. At that time no one realized that the Potomac River split into a North Branch and South Branch just east of Green Spring in what is now Hampshire County, West Virginia. The South Branch extended westward for many more miles than the North Branch. The question arose as to which branch constituted the main branch of the Potomac River. For many years, the North Branch was considered the main bed of the river, and Maryland's southern boundary was set there. In 1746, Thomas Fairfax, 6th Lord Fairfax of Cameron sent a party of surveyors to find the headwaters of the Potomac River. On October 23, 1746, they located what they believed to be the headwaters at what is now Fairfax Stone Historical Monument State Park. They carved the letters "Ffx" and Lord Fairfax's coronet into a large pyramidal rock and placed it at the center of these headwaters. In 1748, the Fairfax Stone and the meridian north of it were approved by the Virginia House of Burgesses and the King in Council as the boundary between Virginia and Maryland. The Maryland Assembly passed legislation in April 1787 to formally establish this north-south meridian. Francis Deakins was appointed surveyor, and in 1788 established what became known as the "Deakins line." The Deakins line became the de facto border of Maryland. Unfortunately, the Deakins line was not straight, and it was not a true meridian but rather drifted to the east (intersecting the border with Pennsylvania about three-quarters of a mile east of where it should have done).

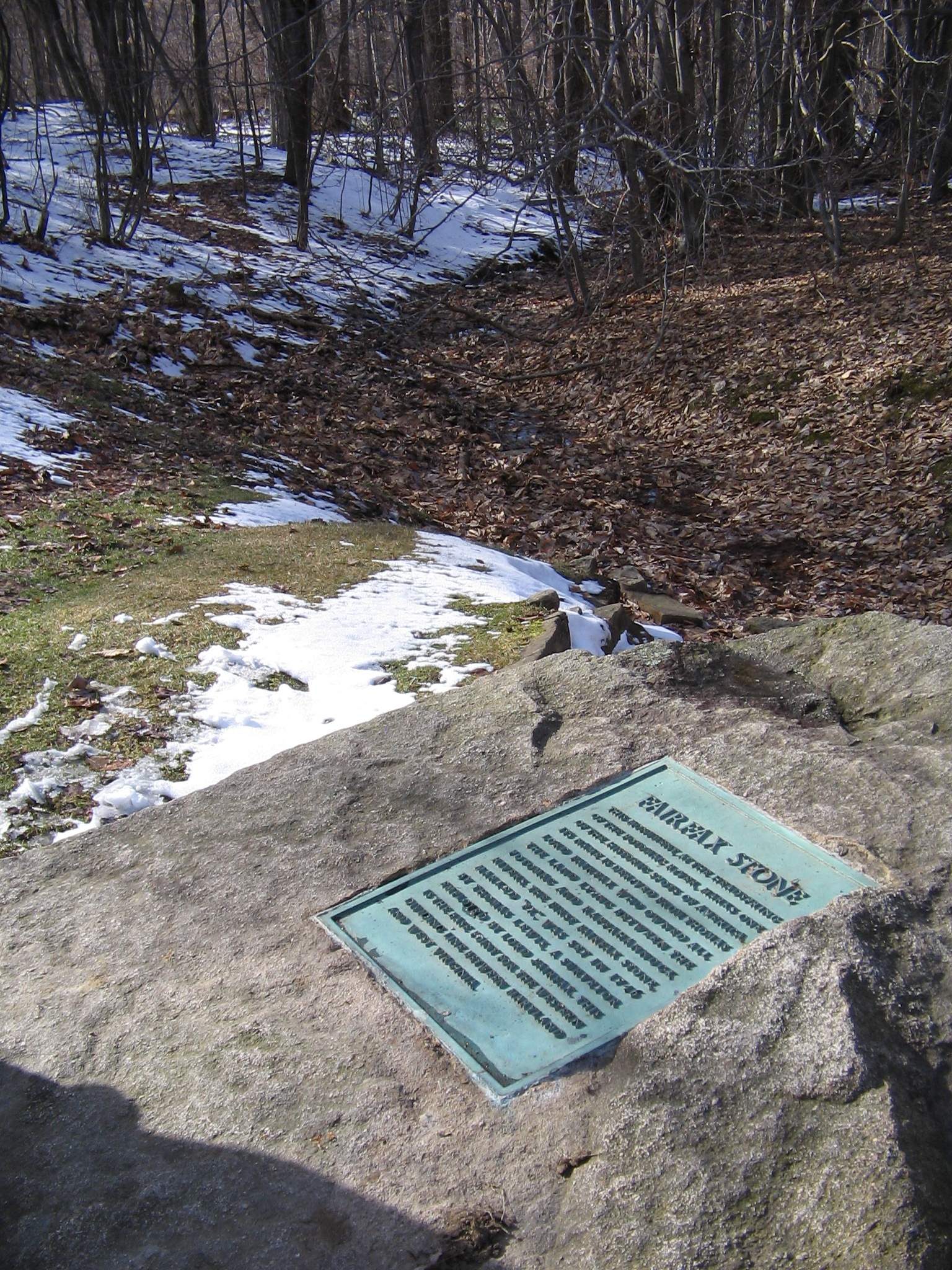
The current Fairfax Stone (a replacement for the vandalized and worn original).

Maryland and Virginia passed legislation in the early 1850s asking the federal government's help in establishing the true border in the area. In 1859, the United States Secretary of War John B. Floyd ordered Lieutenant Nathaniel Michler of the United States Army Corps of Topographical Engineers to establish a true meridian boundary. Virginia refused to accept this line as the true boundary, arguing that the Deakins line had long been accepted as the border between the two states.

In the interim, both states had been busy creating counties in the area and selling this land to private citizens. The state of Virginia created Monongalia County in 1776 out of what was then the unincorporated territory of the District of West August. In 1780, two parts of then-Augusta County were also added to Monongalia County. In 1818, the Virginia state legislature created Preston County out of a portion of Monongalia County. The state of Maryland in 1789 created Allegany County from a portion of Washington County, and then split Garrett County off from Allegany County in 1872. Each state claimed the narrow triangular strip of land between them, leaving landowners in the area angry and confused.

During the American Civil War, Virginia attempted to secede from the United States in 1861 over the issue of slavery. Voters in 41 northwestern counties of Virginia (including Preston County) voted to secede from Virginia the same year, and in 1863 the new state of West Virginia was admitted into the union with the United States. Virginia challenged both actions in the U.S. Supreme Court after the war ended, but the Court ruled in West Virginia's favor in Virginia v. West Virginia, 78 U.S. 39 (1870). The new state of West Virginia also claimed the old Deakins line as its true boundary with Maryland.

On October 12, 1891, the state of Maryland filed suit against the state of West Virginia to settle a dispute regarding the nature of the true boundary between Garrett County, Maryland, and Preston County, West Virginia. By now, the South Branch had been determined to be the main source of the Potomac River, and Maryland began to claim the South Branch as its true southern boundary. In 1897, the state of Maryland appointed a team of surveyors to locate the headwaters of the South Branch of the Potomac River. A marker named the "Potomac Stone" was placed there, and a new survey line north to the Pennsylvania border established, which Maryland claimed as its new border.

== Opinion of the Court ==
Associate Justice William R. Day wrote the decision for the unanimous Court.

Justice Day wrote extensively about the background of the boundary dispute, which was detailed, lengthy, complex, and fact-specific. Justice Day dismissed Maryland's claim to the South Branch and the meridian running north of the Potomac Stone, as the state of Maryland had not pressed the issue in its briefs and arguments before the Court.

As to whether the Deakins line or Michler line was the correct meridan, Justice Day conceded that the Michler line more truly reflected the intent of the land grant to Lord Baltimore. But Day also noted that maps in that era were inaccurate at best, and little surveying of the land had been done. The location of the Fairfax Stone, however, was known and clearly had been referred to as a boundary marker by both states. Indeed, the constitution of Maryland even referred to it as such.

Day concluded that custom and law both accorded the Deakins line the status of official boundary, even if the state of Maryland routinely contested that line as such. "...the evidence contained in this record leaves no room to doubt that after the running of the Deakins line the people of that region knew and referred to it as the line between the state of Virginia and the state of Maryland." Day cited numerous examples in which both states and the people of both states treated the Deakins line as the boundary between the two states. Such evidence determined the true boundary under principles of equity, Day said. He referred to Virginia v. Tennessee, 148 U.S. 503 (1893), and quoted the holding in that case:"'...a boundary line ... which has been run out, located, and marked upon the earth, and afterwards recognized and acquiesced in by the parties for a long course of years, is conclusive, even if it be ascertained that it varies somewhat from the courses given in the original grant...'" Day traced the lineage of this decision rule back through Penn v Baltimore (1750), State of Rhode Island and Providence Plantations v. Commonwealth of Massachusetts, 37 U.S. 657 (1838), State of Rhode Island v. State of Massachusetts, 45 U.S. 591 (1846), State of Indiana v. State of Kentucky, 136 U.S. 479 (1890), and State of Louisiana v. State of Mississippi, 202 U.S. 1 (1906).

Day acknowledged Maryland's attempts over the past 150 years to dispute the boundary. But he concluded that Maryland's legislative statements were unpersuasive in the face of a de facto boundary treated as such by landowners. "True it is, that, after the running of the Deakins line, certain steps were taken, intended to provide a more effectual legal settlement and delimitation of the boundary. But none of these steps were effectual, or such as to disturb the continued possession of the people claiming rights up to the boundary line." Citing State of Rhode Island and Providence Plantations v. Commonwealth of Massachusetts again, Day noted that "a right in its nature prescriptive has arisen, practically undisturbed for many years, not to be overthrown without doing violence to principles of established right and justice equally binding upon states and individuals."

As for West Virginia's cross-claim that its boundary was the high-water mark on the far shore of the Potomac River, Day found Morris v. United States, 174 U.S. 196 (1899), conclusive and dismissed the claim. He held that Maryland's border ran to the low-water mark on the southern bank of the river.

The majority held that a commission of surveyors should be appointed to permanently mark the Deakins line from the Fairfax Stone to the Pennsylvania border.

== Subsequent developments ==
The Supreme Court appointed a team of surveyors to survey the new boundary, and establish it by placing granite slabs every half-mile. In Maryland v. West Virginia, 225 U.S. 1, decided May 2, 1912, the Supreme Court accepted the report of the commissioners, overruled in a per curiam decision the exceptions filed by the state of Maryland, and ordered the boundary set.

The case clearly established that West Virginia's riparian water rights to the Potomac River are the same as Virginia's, as established in Morris v. United States. However, in New Jersey v. New York, 523 U.S. 767 (1998), the U.S. Supreme Court held that a state can acquiesce in the regulation of its water rights by another state and still maintain its sovereign authority over those rights only so long as it protests the regulation. In Virginia v. Maryland, 540 U.S. 56 (2003), the Court dealt with a situation in which the state of Virginia sought to exercise its riparian rights over the Potomac River. Maryland statute and regulation did not permit this exercise of rights, and Virginia sued. The U.S. Supreme Court held that Virginia had maintained its sovereignty over its riparian rights by continuously protesting Maryland's assertion of jurisdiction. This has led some legal observers to conclude that West Virginia, too, must begin protesting Maryland's assertion of regulatory jurisdiction in order for West Virginia to maintain sovereignty over its riparian rights.

The Supreme Court in Maryland v. West Virginia also applied a legal principle known as "prescription" to the boundary dispute. The concept of prescription is based on the idea that a state or individual's uninterrupted possession to land creates a claim on that land. The assumption of the courts has been that a state or person will seek to possess that which is his, and that silence and/or neglect to regain possession indicates the original owner's intent to relinquish the land. Maryland v. West Virginia is considered a classic case where the doctrine of prescription is applied. Although some legal scholars have attempted to provide criteria which would trigger prescription (e.g., 50 years of uninterrupted possession), in Maryland v. West Virginia the Supreme Court held that such decisions must be intensively fact-specific.

Maryland v. West Virginia is also a classic case of the high court applying the legal rule of de minimis non curat lex. This Latin phrase translates into English as "the law does not concern itself with trifles." The de minimis rule was commonly used by the U.S. Supreme Court in the 19th century in areas such as contract, admiralty, and property law. The de minimis rule was used in Maryland v. West Virginia as well, and this is considered one of the most important uses of the rule in the early 20th century.

== See also ==
- Morris v. United States
- List of United States Supreme Court cases, volume 217
