= Eighth Amendment to the United States Constitution =

1791 amendment regulating forms of punishment

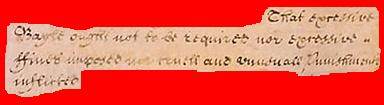
Pertinent part of the English Bill of Rights, December 1689

The Bill of Rights in the National Archives

The Eighth Amendment (Amendment VIII) to the United States Constitution protects against imposing excessive bail, excessive fines, or cruel and unusual punishments. This amendment was adopted on December 15, 1791, along with the rest of the United States Bill of Rights. The amendment serves as a limitation upon the federal and state governments to impose unduly harsh penalties on criminal defendants before and after a conviction. This limitation applies equally to the price for obtaining pretrial release and the punishment for crime after conviction. The phrases in this amendment originated in the English Bill of Rights of 1689.

The prohibition against cruel and unusual punishments has led courts to hold that the Constitution totally prohibits certain kinds of punishment, such as drawing and quartering. Under the Cruel and Unusual Punishment Clause, the Supreme Court has struck down the application of capital punishment in some instances, but capital punishment is still permitted in some cases where the defendant is convicted of murder.

The Supreme Court has held that the Excessive Fines Clause prohibits fines that are "grossly disproportional to the gravity of [the] offense." The Court struck down a fine as excessive for the first time in United States v. Bajakajian (1998). Under the Excessive Bail Clause, the Supreme Court has held that the federal government cannot set bail at "a figure higher than is reasonably calculated" to ensure the defendant's appearance at trial. The Supreme Court has ruled that the Excessive Fines Clause and the Cruel and Unusual Punishments Clause apply to the states, but has not done this regarding the Excessive Bail Clause.

== Text ==
Excessive bail shall not be required, nor excessive fines imposed, nor cruel and unusual punishments inflicted.

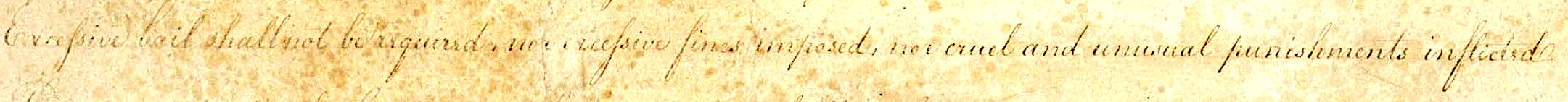
The hand-written copy of the proposed Bill of Rights, 1789, cropped to just show the text that would later be ratified as the Eighth Amendment

== Background and general aspects ==
=== Background ===
The Eighth Amendment was adopted, as part of the Bill of Rights, in 1791. It is almost identical to a provision in the English Bill of Rights of 1689, in which Parliament declared, "as their ancestors in like cases have usually done ... that excessive bail ought not to be required, nor excessive fines imposed, nor cruel and unusual punishments inflicted."

The provision was largely inspired by the case in England of Titus Oates who, after the accession of King James II in 1685, was tried for multiple acts of perjury that had led to executions of many people Oates had wrongly accused. Oates was sentenced to imprisonment, including an annual ordeal of being taken out for two days' pillory plus one day of whipping while tied to a moving cart. The Oates case eventually became a topic of the U.S. Supreme Court's Eighth Amendment jurisprudence. The punishment of Oates involved ordinary penalties collectively imposed in a barbaric, excessive and bizarre manner. The reason why the judges in Oates' perjury case were not allowed to impose the death penalty (unlike in the cases of those whom Oates had falsely accused) may be because such a punishment would have deterred even honest witnesses from testifying in later cases.

England's declaration against "cruel and unusual punishments" was approved by Parliament in February 1689, and was read to King William III and his wife Queen Mary II as the Declaration of Right on the following day. Members of Parliament then explained in August 1689 that "the Commons had a particular regard ... when that Declaration was first made" to punishments like the one that had been inflicted by the King's Bench against Titus Oates. Parliament then enacted the English Bill of Rights into law in December 1689. Members of parliament characterized the punishment in the Oates case as not just "barbarous" and "inhuman" but also "extravagant" and "exorbitant".

There is some scholarly dispute about whom the clause intended to limit. In England, the "cruel and unusual punishments" clause may have been a limitation on the discretion of judges, requiring them to adhere to precedent. According to the great treatise of the 1760s by William Blackstone entitled Commentaries on the Laws of England:

[H]owever unlimited the power of the court may seem, it is far from being wholly arbitrary; but its discretion is regulated by law. For the bill of rights has particularly declared, that excessive fines ought not to be imposed, nor cruel and unusual punishments inflicted: (which had a retrospect to some unprecedented proceedings in the court of king's bench, in the reign of king James the second) ...

Virginia adopted this provision of the English Bill of Rights in the Virginia Declaration of Rights of 1776, and the Virginia convention that ratified the U.S. Constitution recommended in 1788 that this language also be included in the Constitution. Virginians such as George Mason and Patrick Henry wanted to ensure this restriction would also be applied as a limitation on Congress. Mason warned that, otherwise, Congress may "inflict unusual and severe punishments". Henry emphasized that Congress should not be allowed to depart from precedent:

What has distinguished our ancestors?—That they would not admit of tortures, or cruel and barbarous punishment. But Congress may introduce the practice of the civil law, in preference to that of the common law. They may introduce the practice of France, Spain, and Germany--of torturing, to extort a confession of the crime. They will say that they might as well draw examples from those countries as from Great Britain, and they will tell you that there is such a necessity of strengthening the arm of government, that they must have a criminal equity, and extort confession by torture, in order to punish with still more relentless severity. We are then lost and undone.

Ultimately, Henry and Mason prevailed, and the Eighth Amendment was adopted. James Madison changed "ought" to "shall", when he proposed the amendment to Congress in 1789.

=== General aspects ===
In Coker v. Georgia (1977) it was decided that "Eighth Amendment judgments should not be, or appear to be, merely the subjective views of individual Justices; judgment should be informed by objective factors to the maximum possible extent." In Timbs v. Indiana (2019) the Supreme Court stated that the Excessive Bail Clause, the Excessive Fines Clause and the Cruel and Unusual Punishment Clause together form a shield against abuses stemming from the government's punitive or criminal-law-enforcement authority.

== Excessive bail ==
In England, sheriffs originally determined whether to grant bail to criminal suspects. Since they tended to abuse their power, Parliament passed a statute in 1275 whereby bailable and non-bailable offenses were defined. The King's judges often subverted the provisions of the law. It was held that an individual may be held without bail upon the Sovereign's command. Eventually, the Petition of Right of 1628 argued that the King did not have such authority. Later, technicalities in the law were exploited to keep the accused imprisoned without bail even where the offenses were bailable; such loopholes were for the most part closed by the Habeas Corpus Act 1679. Thereafter, judges were compelled to set bail, but they often required impracticable amounts. Finally, the English Bill of Rights (1689) held that "excessive bail ought not to be required."

However, the English Bill of Rights did not determine the distinction between bailable and non-bailable offenses. Thus, the Eighth Amendment has been interpreted to mean that bail may be denied if the charges are sufficiently serious.

The Supreme Court has also permitted "preventive" detention without bail. In United States v. Salerno, 481 U.S. 739 (1987), the Supreme Court held that the only limitation imposed by the Excessive Bail Clause is that "the government's proposed conditions of release or detention not be 'excessive' in light of the perceived evil". In Stack v. Boyle, 342 U.S. 1 (1951), the Supreme Court declared that a bail amount is "excessive" under the Eighth Amendment if it were "a figure higher than is reasonably calculated" to ensure the defendant's appearance at trial.

The incorporation status of the Excessive Bail Clause is unclear. In Schilb v. Kuebel, 404 U.S. 357 (1971), the Court stated in dicta: "Bail, of course, is basic to our system of law, and the Eighth Amendment's proscription of excessive bail has been assumed to have application to the States through the Fourteenth Amendment." In McDonald v. City of Chicago (2010), the right against excessive bail was included in a footnote listing incorporated rights.

== Excessive fines ==
=== Browning-Ferris v. Kelco ===
In Browning-Ferris Industries of Vermont, Inc. v. Kelco Disposal, Inc., 492 U.S. 257 (1989), the Supreme Court ruled that the Excessive Fines Clause does not apply "when the government neither has prosecuted the action nor has any right to receive a share of the damages awarded". While punitive damages in civil cases are not covered by the Excessive Fines Clause, such damages were held to be covered by the Due Process Clause of the Fourteenth Amendment, notably in State Farm Mutual Automobile Insurance Co. v. Campbell, 538 U.S. 408 (2003).

=== Austin v. United States ===
In Austin v. United States 509 U.S. 602 (1993), the Supreme Court ruled that the Excessive Fines Clause does apply to civil asset forfeiture actions taken by the federal government, in the specific case, the government's seizure of the petitioner's mobile home and auto body shop on the basis of his drug dealing on the premises.

=== United States v. Bajakajian ===
In United States v. Bajakajian, 524 U.S. 321 (1998), the Supreme Court ruled that it was unconstitutional to confiscate $357,144 from Hosep Bajakajian, who had failed to report possession of over $10,000 while leaving the United States. In what was the first case in which the Supreme Court ruled that a fine violated the Excessive Fines Clause, the Court held that it was "grossly disproportional" to take all the money Bajakajian had attempted to take out of the United States in violation of a federal law that required that he report an amount in excess of $10,000. In describing what constituted "gross disproportionality", the Court could not find any guidance from the history of the Excessive Fines Clause, and so looked to Cruel and Unusual Punishment Clause case law:

We must therefore rely on other considerations in deriving a constitutional excessiveness standard, and there are two that we find particularly relevant. The first, which we have emphasized in our cases interpreting the Cruel and Unusual Punishments Clause, is that judgments about the appropriate punishment for an offense belong in the first instance to the legislature. See, e.g., Solem v. Helm, 463 U.S. 277, 290 (1983) ("Reviewing courts ... should grant substantial deference to the broad authority that legislatures necessarily possess in determining the types and limits of punishments for crimes"); see also Gore v. United States, 357 U.S. 386, 393 (1958) ("Whatever views may be entertained regarding severity of punishment ... these are peculiarly questions of legislative policy"). The second is that any judicial determination regarding the gravity of a particular criminal offense will be inherently imprecise. Both of these principles counsel against requiring strict proportionality between the amount of a punitive forfeiture and the gravity of a criminal offense, and we therefore adopt the standard of gross disproportionality articulated in our Cruel and Unusual Punishments Clause precedents. See, e.g., Solem v. Helm, supra, at 288; Rummel v. Estelle, 445 U.S. 263, 271 (1980).

Thus the Court declared that, within the context of judicial deference to the legislature's power to set punishments, a fine would not offend the Eighth Amendment unless it were "grossly disproportional to the gravity of a defendant's offense".

=== Timbs v. Indiana ===
In Timbs v. Indiana the Supreme Court ruled that the Excessive Fines Clause applies to state and local governments under the Due Process Clause of the Fourteenth Amendment. The case involves the use of civil asset forfeiture to seize a $42,000 vehicle under state law in addition to the imposition of a $1,200 fine for drug trafficking charges, house arrest, and probation.

== Cruel and unusual punishments ==
=== General aspects ===
The Constitution was amended to prohibit cruel and unusual punishments as part of the United States Bill of Rights as a result of objections raised by people such as Abraham Holmes and Patrick Henry. While Holmes feared the establishment of the Inquisition in the United States, Henry was concerned with the application of torture as a way of extracting confessions. They also feared that the federal government would misuse its powers to create federal crimes as well as to punish those who committed them under the new Constitution and thus use these powers as a way to oppress the people. Abraham Holmes, a member of the Massachusetts Ratifying Convention for the federal constitution, for example noted in a letter from January 30, 1788, that the new Constitution would give the U.S. Congress the power "to ascertain, point out, and determine, what kind of punishments shall be inflicted on persons convicted of crimes." He added with respect those who would belong to the new government under the new Constitution: "They are nowhere restrained from inventing the most cruel and unheard-of punishments, and annexing them to crimes; and there is no constitutional check on them, but that racks and gibbets may be amongst the most mild instruments of their discipline."

Relying on the history of the Eighth Amendment and its own caselaw the Supreme Court stated in Ingraham v. Wright (1977) that the Cruel and Unusual Punishments Clause was designed to protect those convicted of crimes. The Supreme Court consequently determined in Ingraham that the Cruel and Unusual Punishments Clause limits the criminal process in three ways: "[F]irst, it limits the kinds of punishment that can be imposed on those convicted of crimes, e.g., Estelle v. Gamble, supra; Trop v. Dulles, supra; second, it proscribes punishment grossly disproportionate to the severity of the crime, e.g., Weems v. United States, supra; and third, it imposes substantive limits on what can be made criminal and punished as such, e.g., Robinson v. California, supra." The Supreme court observed in Weems v. United States (1910) that the clause of the Constitution prohibiting the infliction of cruel and unusual punishment is "progressive, and is not fastened to the obsolete, but may acquire meaning as public opinion becomes enlightened by a humane justice." In Roper v. Simmons (2005) the Supreme Court observed: "By protecting even those convicted of heinous crimes, the Eighth Amendment reaffirms the duty of the government to respect the dignity of all persons. The prohibition against “cruel and unusual punishments,” like other expansive language in the Constitution, must be interpreted according to its text, by considering history, tradition, and precedent, and with due regard for its purpose and function in the constitutional design."

In Louisiana ex rel. Francis v. Resweber, 329 U.S. 459 (1947), the Supreme Court assumed arguendo that the Cruel and Unusual Punishments Clause applied to the states through the Due Process Clause of the Fourteenth Amendment. In Robinson v. California, 370 U.S. 660 (1962), the Court ruled that it did apply to the states through the Fourteenth Amendment. Robinson was the first case in which the Supreme Court applied the Eighth Amendment against the state governments through the Fourteenth Amendment. Before Robinson, the Eighth Amendment had been applied previously only in cases against the federal government.

Justice Potter Stewart's opinion for the Robinson Court held that "infliction of cruel and unusual punishment is in violation of the Eighth and Fourteenth Amendments." The framers of the Fourteenth Amendment, such as John Bingham, had discussed this subject:

Many instances of State injustice and oppression have already occurred in the State legislation of this Union, of flagrant violations of the guarantied privileges of citizens of the United States, for which the national Government furnished and could furnish by law no remedy whatever. Contrary to the express letter of your Constitution, "cruel and unusual punishments" have been inflicted under State laws within this Union upon citizens, not only for crimes committed, but for sacred duty done, for which and against which the Government of the United States had provided no remedy and could provide none.

In Furman v. Georgia, 408 U.S. 238 (1972), Justice Brennan wrote, "There are, then, four principles by which we may determine whether a particular punishment is 'cruel and unusual'."

- The "essential predicate" is "that a punishment must not by its severity be degrading to human dignity," especially torture.
- "A severe punishment that is obviously inflicted in wholly arbitrary fashion."
- "A severe punishment that is clearly and totally rejected throughout society."
- "A severe punishment that is patently unnecessary."

Justice Brennan added: "The function of these principles, after all, is simply to provide [the] means by which a court can determine whether [the] challenged punishment comports with human dignity. They are, therefore, interrelated, and, in most cases, it will be their convergence that will justify the conclusion that a punishment is 'cruel and unusual'. The test, then, will ordinarily be a cumulative one: if a punishment is unusually severe, if there is a strong probability that it is inflicted arbitrarily, if it is substantially rejected by contemporary society, and if there is no reason to believe that it serves any penal purpose more effectively than some less severe punishment, then the continued infliction of that punishment violates the command of the Clause that the State may not inflict inhuman and uncivilized punishments upon those convicted of crimes."

Justice Brennan also wrote that he expected no state would pass a law obviously violating any one of these principles, so court decisions regarding the Eighth Amendment would involve a "cumulative" analysis of the implication of each of the four principles. In this way, the United States Supreme Court "set the standard that a punishment would be cruel and unusual [if] it was too severe for the crime, [if] it was arbitrary, if it offended society's sense of justice, or if it was not more effective than a less severe penalty."

The plurality of the Supreme Court in Furman v. Georgia stated that the Eighth Amendment is not static, but that its meaning is interpreted in a flexible and dynamic manner to accord with, in the words of Trop v. Dulles, 356 U.S. 86 (1958), at page 101, "the evolving standards of decency that mark the progress of a maturing society." Punishments including capital punishment must therefore not be "excessive". The "excessiveness" of a punishment can be measured by two different aspects, which are independent of each other. The first aspect is whether the punishment involves the unnecessary and wanton infliction of pain. The second aspect is that the punishment must not be grossly out of proportion to the severity of the crime. In Miller v. Alabama, 567 U.S. 460 (2012), the Court explained that the Eighth Amendment "guarantees individuals the right not to be subjected to excessive sanctions", and that "punishment for crime should be graduated and proportioned to both the offender and the offense." The Supreme Court has also looked to "the evolving standards of decency that mark the progress of a maturing society" when addressing the prohibition on cruel and unusual punishments.

Justice Antonin Scalia noted in a concurring opinion in Callins v. Collins (1994): "The Fifth Amendment provides that "[n]o person shall be held to answer for a capital . . . crime, unless on a presentment or indictment of a Grand Jury, . . . nor be deprived of life . . . without due process of law." This clearly permits the death penalty to be imposed, and establishes beyond doubt that the death penalty is not one of the "cruel and unusual punishments" prohibited by the Eighth Amendment." A similar observation was made by the Supreme Court in 2019. The Supreme Court held in Bucklew v. Precythe (2019) that the Due Process Clause expressly allows the death penalty in the United States because "the Fifth Amendment, added to the Constitution at the same time as the Eighth, expressly contemplates that a defendant may be tried for a 'capital' crime and 'deprived of life' as a penalty, so long as proper procedures are followed". The Court also explicitly said: "The Constitution allows capital punishment. [...] Nor did the later addition of the Eighth Amendment outlaw the practice. [...] The same Constitution that permits States to authorize capital punishment also allows them to outlaw it. [...] While the Eighth Amendment doesn't forbid capital punishment, it does speak to how States may carry out that punishment, prohibiting methods that are 'cruel and unusual'." The Court also explained in Bucklew that "what unites the punishments the Eighth Amendment was understood to forbid, and distinguishes them from those it was understood to allow, is that the former were long disused (unusual) forms of punishment that intensified the sentence of death with a (cruel) superadd[ition] of terror, pain, or disgrace."

=== Specific aspects ===
According to the Supreme Court, the Eighth Amendment forbids some punishments entirely, and forbids some other punishments that are excessive when compared to the crime, or compared to the competence of the perpetrator. This will be discussed in the sections below.

==== Punishments forbidden regardless of the crime ====
In Wilkerson v. Utah, 99 U.S. 130 (1878), the Supreme Court commented that drawing and quartering, public dissection, burning alive, or disembowelment constituted cruel and unusual punishment. (Note: The plurality opinion in Baze v. Rees, 553 U.S. 35 (2008) written by Chief Justice John Roberts states: "This Court has never invalidated a State's chosen procedure for carrying out a sentence of death as the infliction of cruel and unusual punishment. In Wilkerson v. Utah, 99 U. S. 130 (1879), we upheld a sentence to death by firing squad imposed by a territorial court, rejecting the argument that such a sentence constituted cruel and unusual punishment. Id., at 134–135. We noted there the difficulty of "defin[ing] with exactness the extent of the constitutional provision which provides that cruel and unusual punishments shall not be inflicted." Id., at 135–136. Rather than undertake such an effort, the Wilkerson Court simply noted that "it is safe to affirm that punishments of torture, . . . and all others in the same line of unnecessary cruelty, are forbidden" by the Eighth Amendment. Id., at 136. By way of example, the Court cited cases from England in which "terror, pain, or disgrace were sometimes superadded" to the sentence, such as where the condemned was "embowelled alive, beheaded, and quartered," or instances of "public dissection in murder, and burning alive." Id., at 135. In contrast, we observed that the firing squad was routinely used as a method of execution for military officers. Id., at 137. What each of the forbidden punishments had in common was the deliberate infliction of pain for the sake of pain—"superadd[ing]" pain to the death sentence through torture and the like. We carried these principles further in In re Kemmler, 136 U. S. 436 (1890). There we rejected an opportunity to incorporate the Eighth Amendment against the States in a challenge to the first execution by electrocution, to be carried out by the State of New York. Id., at 449. In passing over that question, however, we observed that "[p]unishments are cruel when they involve torture or a lingering death; but the punishment of death is not cruel within the meaning of that word as used in the Constitution. It implies there something inhuman and barbarous, something more than the mere extinguishment of life." Id., at 447. We noted that the New York statute adopting electrocution as a method of execution "was passed in the effort to devise a more humane method of reaching the result." Ibid.") Relying on Eighth Amendment case law Justice William O. Douglas stated in his Robinson v. California, 370 U.S. 660 (1962) concurrence opinion that "historic punishments that were cruel and unusual included "burning at the stake, crucifixion, breaking on the wheel" (In re Kemmler, 136 U. S. 436, 136 U. S. 446), quartering, the rack and thumbscrew (see Chambers v. Florida, 309 U. S. 227, 309 U. S. 237), and, in some circumstances, even solitary confinement (see In re Medley, 134 U. S. 160, 134 U. S. 167-168)." In Thompson v. Oklahoma, 487 U.S. 815 (1988), the Supreme Court ruled that the death penalty constituted cruel and unusual punishment if the defendant is under age 16 when the crime was committed. Furthermore, in Roper v. Simmons, 543 U.S. 551 (2005), the Court barred the execution of people who were under age 18 when the crime was committed. In Atkins v. Virginia, 536 U.S. 304 (2002), the Court declared that executing people who are mentally handicapped constituted cruel and unusual punishment.

==== Punishments forbidden for certain crimes ====
The case of Weems v. United States, 217 U.S. 349 (1910), marked the first time the Supreme Court exercised judicial review to overturn a criminal sentence as cruel and unusual. The Court overturned a punishment called cadena temporal, which mandated "hard and painful labor", shackling for the duration of incarceration, and permanent civil disabilities. This case is often viewed as establishing a principle of proportionality under the Eighth Amendment. However, others have written that "it is hard to view Weems as announcing a constitutional requirement of proportionality."

In Trop v. Dulles, 356 U.S. 86 (1958), the Supreme Court held that punishing a natural-born citizen for a crime by revoking his citizenship is unconstitutional, being "more primitive than torture" because it involved the "total destruction of the individual's status in organized society".

In Robinson v. California, 370 U.S. 660 (1962), the Court decided a California law authorizing a 90-day jail sentence for "be[ing] addicted to the use of narcotics" violated the Eighth Amendment, as narcotics addiction "is apparently an illness", and California was attempting to punish people based on the state of this illness, rather than for any specific act. The Court wrote:

To be sure, imprisonment for ninety days is not, in the abstract, a punishment which is either cruel or unusual. But the question cannot be considered in the abstract. Even one day in prison would be a cruel and unusual punishment for the 'crime' of having a common cold.

However, in Powell v. Texas, 392 U.S. 514 (1968), the Court upheld a statute barring public intoxication by distinguishing Robinson on the basis that Powell dealt with a person who was drunk in public, not merely for being addicted to alcohol.

Traditionally, the length of a prison sentence was not subject to scrutiny under the Eighth Amendment, regardless of the crime for which the sentence was imposed. It was not until the case of Solem v. Helm, 463 U.S. 277 (1983), that the Supreme Court held that incarceration, standing alone, could constitute cruel and unusual punishment if it were "disproportionate" in duration to the offense. The Court outlined three factors that were to be considered in determining if a sentence is excessive: "(i) the gravity of the offense and the harshness of the penalty; (ii) the sentences imposed on other criminals in the same jurisdiction; and (iii) the sentences imposed for commission of the same crime in other jurisdictions." The Court held that in the circumstances of the case before it and the factors to consider, a sentence of life imprisonment without parole for cashing a $100 check on a closed account was cruel and unusual.

However, in Harmelin v. Michigan, 501 U.S. 957 (1991), a fractured Court retreated from the Solem test and held that for non-capital sentences, the Eighth Amendment constrains only the length of prison terms by a "gross disproportionality principle". Under this principle, the Court sustained a mandatory sentence of life without parole imposed for possession of 672 grams (1.5 pounds) or more of cocaine. The Court acknowledged that a punishment could be cruel but not unusual, and therefore not prohibited by the Constitution. Additionally, in Harmelin, Justice Scalia, joined by Chief Justice Rehnquist, said "the Eighth Amendment contains no proportionality guarantee," and that "what was 'cruel and unusual' under the Eighth Amendment was to be determined without reference to the particular offense." Scalia wrote "If 'cruel and unusual punishments' included disproportionate punishments, the separate prohibition of disproportionate fines (which are certainly punishments) would have been entirely superfluous." Moreover, "There is little doubt that those who framed, proposed, and ratified the Bill of Rights were aware of such provisions [outlawing disproportional punishments], yet chose not to replicate them."

In Graham v. Florida, 560 U.S. 48 (2010), the Supreme Court declared that a life sentence without any chance of parole, for a crime other than murder, is cruel and unusual punishment for a minor. Two years later, in Miller v. Alabama, 567 U.S. 460 (2012), the Court went further, holding that mandatory life sentences without parole cannot be imposed on minors, even for homicide.

==== Death penalty for rape ====
In Coker v. Georgia, 433 U.S. 584 (1977), the Court declared that the death penalty was unconstitutionally excessive for rape of a woman and, by implication, for any crime where a death does not occur. The majority in Coker stated that "death is indeed a disproportionate penalty for the crime of raping an adult woman." The dissent countered that the majority "takes too little account of the profound suffering the crime imposes upon the victims and their loved ones". The dissent also characterized the majority as "myopic" for considering legal history of only "the past five years".

In Kennedy v. Louisiana, 554 U.S. 407 (2008), the Court extended the reasoning of Coker by ruling that the death penalty was excessive for child rape "where the victim's life was not taken". The Supreme Court failed to note a federal law which applies to military court-martial proceedings that provided for the death penalty in cases of child rape. On October 1, 2008, the Court declined to reconsider its opinion in the case, but did amend the majority and dissenting opinions to acknowledge that federal law. Justice Scalia (joined by Chief Justice Roberts) wrote in dissent that "the proposed Eighth Amendment would have been laughed to scorn if it had read 'no criminal penalty shall be imposed which the Supreme Court deems unacceptable'."

==== Special procedures for death penalty cases ====
Justice Scalia noted in a concurring opinion in Callins v. Collins (1994): "The Fifth Amendment provides that "[n]o person shall be held to answer for a capital . . . crime, unless on a presentment or indictment of a Grand Jury, . . . nor be deprived of life . . . without due process of law." This clearly permits the death penalty to be imposed, and establishes beyond doubt that the death penalty is not one of the "cruel and unusual punishments" prohibited by the Eighth Amendment." A similar observation was made by the Supreme Court in Bucklew v. Precythe (2019), which explicitly said: "The Constitution allows capital punishment. [...] Nor did the later addition of the Eighth Amendment outlaw the practice. [...] While the Eighth Amendment doesn't forbid capital punishment, it does speak to how States may carry out that punishment, prohibiting methods that are 'cruel and unusual'." The Supreme Court also held in Bucklew that the Due Process Clause expressly allows the death penalty in the United States because "the Fifth Amendment, added to the Constitution at the same time as the Eighth, expressly contemplates that a defendant may be tried for a 'capital' crime and 'deprived of life' as a penalty, so long as proper procedures are followed".

The first significant general challenge to capital punishment that reached the Supreme Court was the case of Furman v. Georgia, 408 U.S. 238 (1972). The Supreme Court overturned the death sentences of Furman for murder, as well as two other defendants for rape. Of the five justices voting to overturn the death penalty, two found that capital punishment was unconstitutionally cruel and unusual, while three found that the statutes at issue were implemented in a random and capricious fashion, discriminating against blacks and the poor. Furman v. Georgia did not hold—even though it is sometimes claimed that it did—that capital punishment is per se unconstitutional.

States with capital punishment rewrote their laws to address the Supreme Court's decision, and the Court then revisited the issue in a murder case: Gregg v. Georgia, 428 U.S. 153 (1976). In Gregg, the Court ruled that Georgia's revised death penalty laws passed Eighth Amendment scrutiny: the statutes provided a bifurcated trial in which guilt and sentence were determined separately; and, the statutes provided for "specific jury findings" followed by state supreme court review comparing each death sentence "with the sentences imposed on similarly situated defendants to ensure that the sentence of death in a particular case is not disproportionate." Because of the Gregg decision, executions resumed in 1977.

Some states have passed laws imposing mandatory death penalties in certain cases. The Supreme Court found these laws unconstitutional under the Eighth Amendment, in the murder case of Woodson v. North Carolina, 428 U.S. 280 (1976), because these laws remove discretion from the trial judge to make an individualized determination in each case. Other statutes specifying factors for courts to use in making their decisions have been upheld. Some have not: in Godfrey v. Georgia, 446 U.S. 420 (1980), the Supreme Court overturned a sentence based upon a finding that a murder was "outrageously or wantonly vile, horrible, and inhuman", as it deemed that any murder may be reasonably characterized in this manner. Similarly, in Maynard v. Cartwright, 486 U.S. 356 (1988), the Court found that an "especially heinous, atrocious or cruel" standard in a homicide case was too vague. However, the meaning of this language depends on how lower courts interpret it. In Walton v. Arizona, 497 U.S. 639 (1990), the Court found that the phrase "especially heinous, cruel, or depraved" was not vague in a murder case, because the state supreme court had expounded on its meaning.

The Court has generally held that death penalty cases require extra procedural protections. As the Court said in Herrera v. Collins, 506 U.S. 390 (1993), which involved the murder of a police officer, "the Eighth Amendment requires increased reliability of the process..."

==== Punishments specifically allowed ====
In Wilkerson v. Utah, 99 U.S. 130 (1878) the Court stated that death by firing squad is not cruel and unusual punishment under the Eighth Amendment.

In Rummel v. Estelle, 445 U.S. 263 (1980), the Court upheld a life sentence with the possibility of parole imposed per Texas's three strikes law for fraud crimes totaling $230. A few months later, Rummel challenged his sentence for ineffective assistance of counsel, his appeal was upheld, and as part of a plea bargain Rummel pled guilty to theft and was released for time served.

In Harmelin v. Michigan, 501 U.S. 957 (1991), the Court upheld a life sentence without the possibility of parole for possession of 672 grams (1.5 pounds) of cocaine.

In Lockyer v. Andrade, 538 U.S. 63 (2003), the Court upheld a 50 years to life sentence with the possibility of parole imposed under California's three strikes law when the defendant was convicted of shoplifting videotapes worth a total of about $150.

In Baze v. Rees, 553 U.S. 35 (2008) the Court upheld Kentucky's execution protocol using a three-drug cocktail.

In Glossip v. Gross 576 U.S. 863 (2015) the Court upheld the use of lethal injections using the drug midazolam.

In Bucklew v. Precythe, 587 U.S. ___ (2019) the Court ruled that when a convict sentenced to death challenges the State's method of execution due to claims of excessive pain, the convict must show that other alternative methods of execution exist and clearly demonstrate they would cause less pain than the state-determined one.

==== Evolving standards of decency ====
In Trop v. Dulles, 356 U.S. 86 (1958), Chief Justice Earl Warren said: "The [Eighth] Amendment must draw its meaning from the evolving standards of decency that mark the progress of a maturing society." Subsequently, the Court has looked to societal developments, as well as looking to its own independent judgment, in determining what are those "evolving standards of decency". In Kennedy v. Louisiana (2008) the Supreme Court stated: "Evolving standards of decency must embrace and express respect for the dignity of the person, and the punishment of criminals must conform to that rule."

Originalists like Justice Scalia argue that societies may rot instead of maturing and may decrease in virtue or wisdom instead of increasing. Thus, they say, the framers wanted the amendment understood as it was written and ratified, instead of morphing as times change, and in any event legislators are more competent than judges to take the pulse of the public as to changing standards of decency.

The "evolving standards" test has been subject to scholarly criticism. For example, law professor John Stinneford asserts that the "evolving standards" test misinterprets the Eighth Amendment:

The Framers of the Bill of Rights understood the word "unusual" to mean "contrary to long usage." Recognition of the word's original meaning will precisely invert the "evolving standards of decency" test, and ask the Court to compare challenged punishments with the longstanding principles and precedents of the common law, rather than shifting and nebulous notions of "societal consensus" and contemporary "standards of decency.

On the other hand, law professor Dennis Baker defends the evolving standards of decency test as advancing the moral purpose of the Eighth Amendment to ban the inflicting of unjust, oppressive, or disproportional punishments by a state on its citizens.

==== Proportionality ====
The Supreme Court has applied evolving standards not only to say what punishments are inherently cruel, but also to say what punishments that are not inherently cruel are nevertheless "grossly disproportionate" to the offense in question. An example can be seen in Jackson v. Bishop an Eighth Circuit decision outlawing corporal punishment in the Arkansas prison system: "The scope of the Amendment is not static ...[D]isproportion, both among punishments and between punishment and crime, is a factor to be considered ..." The Supreme court observed in Weems v. United States (1910) that "it is a precept of justice that punishment for crime should be graduated and proportioned to offense." Relying on and citing its early cases O'Neil v. Vermont, 144 U.S. 323 (1892) and Weems v. United States the Supreme Court concluded in Enmund v. Florida that the Cruel and Unusual Punishments Clause is partly a prohibition of all punishments which, by their excessive length or severity, are greatly disproportioned to the offenses charged.

Law professor John Stinneford asserts that the Eighth Amendment forbids punishments that are very disproportionate to the offense, even if the punishment by itself is not intrinsically barbaric, but he argues that "proportionality is to be measured primarily in terms of prior practice" according to the word unusual in the amendment, instead of being measured according to shifting and nebulous evolving standards. Stinneford argues that the word unusual in the Eighth Amendment has a very different meaning in comparison to those who use originalism to interpret the U.S. Constitution. He writes: "But in reality, the word 'unusual' in the Eighth Amendment did not originally mean 'rare'– it meant 'contrary to long usage', or 'new'. A punishment is cruel and unusual if it is 'cruel in light of long usage' – that is, cruel in comparison to longstanding prior practice or tradition." Similarly, law professor John Bessler points to "An Essay on Crimes and Punishments", written by Cesare Beccaria in the 1760s, which advocated proportionate punishments; many of the Founding Fathers, including Thomas Jefferson and James Madison, read Beccaria's treatise and were influenced by it.

Thus, Stinneford and Bessler disagree with the view of Justice Scalia, joined by Chief Justice Rehnquist, in Harmelin v. Michigan where they denied that the Punishments Clause contains any proportionality principle. With Scalia and Rehnquist, Richard Epstein argues that the amendment does not refer broadly to the imposition of penalties, but rather refers more narrowly to the penalties themselves; Epstein says judges who favor the broad view tend to omit the letter "s" at the end of the word "punishments".

== See also ==
- United States constitutional criminal procedure
- Capital punishment in the United States
- Crimes against humanity
- Medical care and safety of inmates
  - Healthcare in American women's prisons
  - Michelle Kosilek
  - Estelle v. Gamble (1976)
  - Helling v. McKinney (1993)
  - Farmer v. Brennan (1994)
  - Prisoner abuse in the United States
  - Infectious diseases within American prisons
