= List of United States Supreme Court cases, volume 217 =

Supreme Court of the United States
- Interactive map of Supreme Court of the United States
- 38°53′26″N 77°00′16″W
- Established: March 4, 1789; 236 years ago
- Location: Washington, D.C.
- Coordinates: 38°53′26″N 77°00′16″W
- Composition method: Presidential nomination with Senate confirmation
- Authorised by: Constitution of the United States, Art. III, § 1
- Judge term length: life tenure, subject to impeachment and removal
- Number of positions: 9 (by statute)
- Website: supremecourt.gov

This is a list of cases reported in volume 217 of United States Reports, decided by the Supreme Court of the United States in 1910.

== Justices of the Supreme Court at the time of volume 217 U.S. ==
The Supreme Court is established by Article III, Section 1 of the Constitution of the United States, which says: "The judicial Power of the United States, shall be vested in one supreme Court . . .". The size of the Court is not specified; the Constitution leaves it to Congress to set the number of justices. Under the Judiciary Act of 1789 Congress originally fixed the number of justices at six (one chief justice and five associate justices). Since 1789 Congress has varied the size of the Court from six to seven, nine, ten, and back to nine justices (always including one chief justice).

When the cases in volume 217 were decided the Court comprised the following nine members (although Justice Brewer died while the cases in this volume were being adjudicated):

Portrait	Justice	Office	Home State	Succeeded	Date confirmed by the Senate (Vote)	Tenure on Supreme Court
	Melville Fuller	Chief Justice	Illinois	Morrison Waite	July 20, 1888 (41–20)	October 8, 1888 – July 4, 1910 (Died)
	John Marshall Harlan	Associate Justice	Kentucky	David Davis	November 29, 1877 (Acclamation)	December 10, 1877 – October 14, 1911 (Died)
	David Josiah Brewer	Associate Justice	Kansas	Stanley Matthews	December 18, 1889 (53–11)	January 6, 1890 – March 28, 1910 (Died)
	Edward Douglass White	Associate Justice	Louisiana	Samuel Blatchford	February 19, 1894 (Acclamation)	March 12, 1894 – December 18, 1910 (Continued as chief justice)
	Joseph McKenna	Associate Justice	California	Stephen Johnson Field	January 21, 1898 (Acclamation)	January 26, 1898 – January 5, 1925 (Retired)
	Oliver Wendell Holmes Jr.	Associate Justice	Massachusetts	Horace Gray	December 4, 1902 (Acclamation)	December 8, 1902 – January 12, 1932 (Retired)
	William R. Day	Associate Justice	Ohio	George Shiras Jr.	February 23, 1903 (Acclamation)	March 2, 1903 – November 13, 1922 (Retired)
	William Henry Moody	Associate Justice	Massachusetts	Henry Billings Brown	December 12, 1906 (Acclamation)	December 17, 1906 – November 20, 1910 (Retired)
	Horace Harmon Lurton	Associate Justice	Tennessee	Rufus W. Peckham	December 20, 1909 (Acclamation)	January 3, 1910 – July 12, 1914 (Died)

== Citation style ==
Under the Judiciary Act of 1789 the federal court structure at the time comprised District Courts, which had general trial jurisdiction; Circuit Courts, which had mixed trial and appellate (from the US District Courts) jurisdiction; and the United States Supreme Court, which had appellate jurisdiction over the federal District and Circuit courts—and for certain issues over state courts. The Supreme Court also had limited original jurisdiction (i.e., in which cases could be filed directly with the Supreme Court without first having been heard by a lower federal or state court). There were one or more federal District Courts and/or Circuit Courts in each state, territory, or other geographical region.

The Judiciary Act of 1891 created the United States Courts of Appeals and reassigned the jurisdiction of most routine appeals from the district and circuit courts to these appellate courts. The Act created nine new courts that were originally known as the "United States Circuit Courts of Appeals." The new courts had jurisdiction over most appeals of lower court decisions. The Supreme Court could review either legal issues that a court of appeals certified or decisions of court of appeals by writ of certiorari.

Bluebook citation style is used for case names, citations, and jurisdictions.

- "# Cir." = United States Court of Appeals
  - e.g., "3d Cir." = United States Court of Appeals for the Third Circuit
- "C.C.D." = United States Circuit Court for the District of . . .
  - e.g.,"C.C.D.N.J." = United States Circuit Court for the District of New Jersey
- "D." = United States District Court for the District of . . .
  - e.g.,"D. Mass." = United States District Court for the District of Massachusetts
- "E." = Eastern; "M." = Middle; "N." = Northern; "S." = Southern; "W." = Western
  - e.g.,"C.C.S.D.N.Y." = United States Circuit Court for the Southern District of New York
  - e.g.,"M.D. Ala." = United States District Court for the Middle District of Alabama
- "Ct. Cl." = United States Court of Claims
- The abbreviation of a state's name alone indicates the highest appellate court in that state's judiciary at the time.
  - e.g.,"Pa." = Supreme Court of Pennsylvania
  - e.g.,"Me." = Supreme Judicial Court of Maine

== List of cases in volume 217 U.S. ==
Case Name	Page & year	Opinion of the Court	Concurring opinion(s)	Dissenting opinion(s)	Lower Court	Disposition
Maryland v. West Virginia I	1 (1910)	Day	none	none	original	decree for Md.
Will v. Tornabells	47 (1910)	White	none	none	D.P.R.	affirmed
Frellsen & Company v. Crandell	71 (1910)	Fuller	none	none	La.	affirmed
Williams v. Arkansas	79 (1910)	Fuller	none	none	Ark.	affirmed
International Textbook Company v. Pigg	91 (1910)	Harlan	none	none	Kan.	reversed
Southwestern Oil Company v. Texas	114 (1910)	Harlan	none	none	Tex.	affirmed
Unity Banking & Savings Company v. Bettman	127 (1910)	Harlan	none	none	6th Cir.	affirmed
St. Louis Southwestern Railway Company v. Arkansas	136 (1910)	White	none	none	Ark.	reversed
Todd v. Romeu	150 (1910)	White	none	none	D.P.R.	affirmed
Davis v. Cleveland, Cincinnati, Chicago and St. Louis Railway Company	157 (1910)	McKenna	none	none	C.C.N.D. Iowa	reversed
Chicago, St. Paul, Minneapolis and Omaha Railway Company v. United States	180 (1910)	McKenna	none	none	Ct. Cl.	affirmed
Boston Chamber of Commerce v. City of Boston	189 (1910)	Holmes	none	none	Mass. Super. Ct.	affirmed
Missouri Pacific Railroad Company v. Nebraska	196 (1910)	Holmes	none	none	Neb.	reversed
Southern Railroad Company v. Miller	209 (1910)	Day	none	none	Ga. Ct. App.	affirmed
Los Angeles Farming & Milling Company v. City of Los Angeles	217 (1910)	Day	none	none	Cal.	dismissed
Wynne v. United States	234 (1910)	Lurton	none	none	D. Haw.	affirmed
St. Louis et al. Railroad Company v. Wabash Railroad Company	247 (1910)	Fuller	none	none	multiple	multiple
Lutcher et al. Company v. Knight	257 (1910)	White	none	none	5th Cir.	reversed
McClellan v. Carland	268 (1910)	Day	none	none	8th Cir.	reversed
Brantley v. Georgia	284 (1910)	per curiam	none	none	Ga.	affirmed
United States v. Carter	286 (1910)	Lurton	none	none	7th Cir.	affirmed
Stewart v. Griffith	323 (1910)	Holmes	none	none	D.C. Cir.	affirmed
United States v. Welch	333 (1910)	Holmes	none	none	C.C.E.D. Ky.	affirmed
Lord & Hewlett v. United States	340 (1910)	Harlan	none	none	Ct. Cl.	affirmed
Weems v. United States	349 (1910)	McKenna	none	White	Phil.	reversed
Standard Oil of Kentucky Company v. Tennessee	413 (1910)	Holmes	none	none	Tenn.	affirmed
Heike v. United States	423 (1910)	Day	none	none	C.C.S.D.N.Y.	dismissed
Grenada Lumber Company v. Mississippi	433 (1910)	Lurton	none	none	Miss.	affirmed
Citizens National Bank v. Kentucky ex rel. Boyle County	443 (1910)	Lurton	none	White	Ky.	affirmed
Fay v. Crozer	455 (1910)	per curiam	none	none	C.C.S.D.W. Va.	dismissed
Hutchinson Pierce & Company v. Loewy	457 (1910)	Fuller	none	none	2d Cir.	dismissed
Kidd et al. Company v. Musselman Grocer Company	461 (1910)	White	none	none	Mich.	affirmed
Souffront v. Compagnie des Sucreries	475 (1910)	White	none	none	D.P.R.	affirmed
Owen v. Dudley & Michener	488 (1910)	McKenna	none	none	D.C. Cir.	affirmed
H.C. Cook Company v. Beecher	497 (1910)	Holmes	none	none	C.C.D. Conn.	affirmed
Stoffela v. Nugent	499 (1910)	Holmes	none	none	Sup. Ct. Terr. Ariz.	reversed
Javierre v. Central Altagracia	502 (1910)	Holmes	none	none	D.P.R.	reversed
Holmgren v. United States	509 (1910)	Day	none	none	9th Cir.	affirmed
Southern Railroad Company v. King	524 (1910)	Day	none	Holmes	5th Cir.	affirmed
Freeman v. United States	539 (1910)	Day	none	none	Phil.	affirmed
Columbia Heights Realty Company v. Rudolph	547 (1910)	Lurton	none	none	D.C. Cir.	affirmed
Wallach v. Rudolph	561 (1910)	Lurton	none	none	D.C. Cir.	dismissed
Brown Forman Company v. Kentucky	563 (1910)	Lurton	none	none	Ky.	affirmed
Maryland v. West Virginia II	577 (1910)	Day	none	none	original	boundary set
Ex parte Gruetter	586 (1910)	Fuller	none	none	C.C.N.D. Tenn.	mandamus denied

== See also ==
- Certificate of division
