= Wilkerson v. Utah =

- Supreme Court of the United States

Argued January 8, 1879 Decided March 17, 1879
- Full case name: Wallace Wilkerson, plaintiff in error, v. People of the United States in the Territory of Utah
- Citations: 99 U.S. 130 (more) 25 L. Ed. 345; 1878 U.S. LEXIS 1517; 9 Otto 130

Holding
- Utah Territory court's sentence of death by firing squad was not cruel and unusual punishment; Supreme Court of the Territory of Utah affirmed.

Court membership
- Chief Justice Morrison Waite Associate Justices Nathan Clifford · Noah H. Swayne; Samuel F. Miller · Stephen J. Field; William Strong · Joseph P. Bradley; Ward Hunt · John M. Harlan

Case opinion
- Majority: Clifford, joined by unanimous

Laws applied
- U.S. Const. amend. VIII

Wilkerson v. Utah, 99 U.S. 130 (1879), is a United States Supreme Court case in which the Court affirmed the judgment of the Supreme Court of the Territory of Utah in stating that execution by firing squad, as prescribed by the Utah territorial statute, was not cruel and unusual punishment under the Eighth Amendment to the United States Constitution.

== Facts of the case ==
On November 22, 1877 Wallace Wilkerson was charged with premeditated murder for allegedly shooting and killing William Baxter, to which Wilkerson claimed innocence. Wilkerson was said to have had several disagreements with Baxter prior to the other man's death. Just two days after opening statements, Wilkerson was sentenced to die on December 14, 1877 by Judge P.H. Emerson. He was given a choice of execution between decapitation, hanging, and firing squad; Wilkerson elected to be executed by firing squad. The following year, Wilkerson appealed to the Supreme Court of Utah territory on the grounds that execution by firing squad presented unnecessary cruelty and unusual punishment. His lawyers, Hodge and Williams argued that because of the nature of firing squads, his 8th amendment right to protection from cruel and unusual punishment had been violated. The appeal was later struck down in the Supreme Court, where they upheld the initial decision of the First Court of the Territory of Utah. Justice Nathan Clifford delivered the opinion of the court. This decision would later be cited in Baze v. Rees (2008) in affirming that lethal injection was not cruel and unusual punishment under the 8th amendment. However, in finding the firing squad to be a constitutional means of execution, the Court also held that old English methods of execution such as disembowelment, beheading, and burning violated the Eighth Amendment's prohibition against cruel and unusual punishment.

== Court's decision ==
A legislative act of Utah, passed March 6, 1862, states that a person convicted of a capital offense “shall suffer death by being shot, hanged, or beheaded,” decided by the court, or “he shall have his option as to the manner of his execution.” The Penal Code of 1876 then goes to state any person convicted of murder in the first degree “shall suffer death,” and “the several sections of this code, which declare certain crimes to be punishable as therein mentioned, devolve a duty upon the court authorized to pass sentence, to determine and impose the punishment prescribed.” The court ruled that death by firing squad was permissible, but it agreed that old English practices of execution where prisoners were “emboweled alive, beheaded, and quartered,” publicly dissected and burned alive were unconstitutional. The Utah Territory law did not provide a method of execution, that was what the court and judge decided. Wilkerson claimed that firing squad executions were unconstitutional. All proceedings were regulated and the record shows that the court decided Wilkerson will be taken to a district somewhere in the district on December 14 to carry out the execution in public.

== Opinion of the court ==
Justice Clifford delivered the opinion of the court and stated that prisoner Mr. Wilkerson was legally charged with first-degree murder with malicious intent. He pleaded not guilty and later was indicted by a grand jury. He was given a fair trial and at the end of it he was found guilty of murder of the first degree. The court sentenced him to be taken to a place where he would be held until his last named day where he would finally be publicly shot until dead. Provision of the law states, that every person guilty of murder in the first degree shall suffer death. The antecedent law states that “when any person shall be convicted of any crime the punishment of which is death,… he shall suffer death by being shot, hung, or beheaded as the court may direct,” or as the convicted person chooses. In his opinion he states that a person guilty of first degree murder “shall suffer death”, which is exactly what the statute says. Section 10 of the code states that when a person convicted of murder to the first degree cruel and unusual punishment shall not be inflicted. The Court held that organized territories are given legislative power,"which extends to all rightful subjects of legislation not inconsistent with the Constitution and laws of the United States. Congress organized the Territory of Utah on the 9th of September, 1850, and provided that the legislative power and authority of the territory shall be vested in the governor and legislative assembly." "Proceedings in the court of original jurisdiction being ended, the prisoner sued out a writ of error and removed the cause into the Supreme Court of the Territory, where the judgment of the subordinate court was affirmed. Final judgment having been rendered in the Supreme Court of the Territory, the prisoner sued out the present writ of error, the act of Congress providing that such a writ from this court to the Supreme Court of the Territory will lie in criminal cases where the accused is sentenced to capital punishment."

== Subsequent developments ==
=== Baze v. Rees ===
In April 2008, U.S. Supreme Court Justice Clarence Thomas cited the case of Wilkerson v. Utah in affirming that Kentucky's method of execution by lethal injection did not constitute cruel and unusual punishment.

== See also ==
- Capital punishment in Utah
- Capital punishment in the United States
- Wallace Wilkerson
- Execution by firing squad
