= Jackson v. Bishop =

1968 US Court of Appeals case

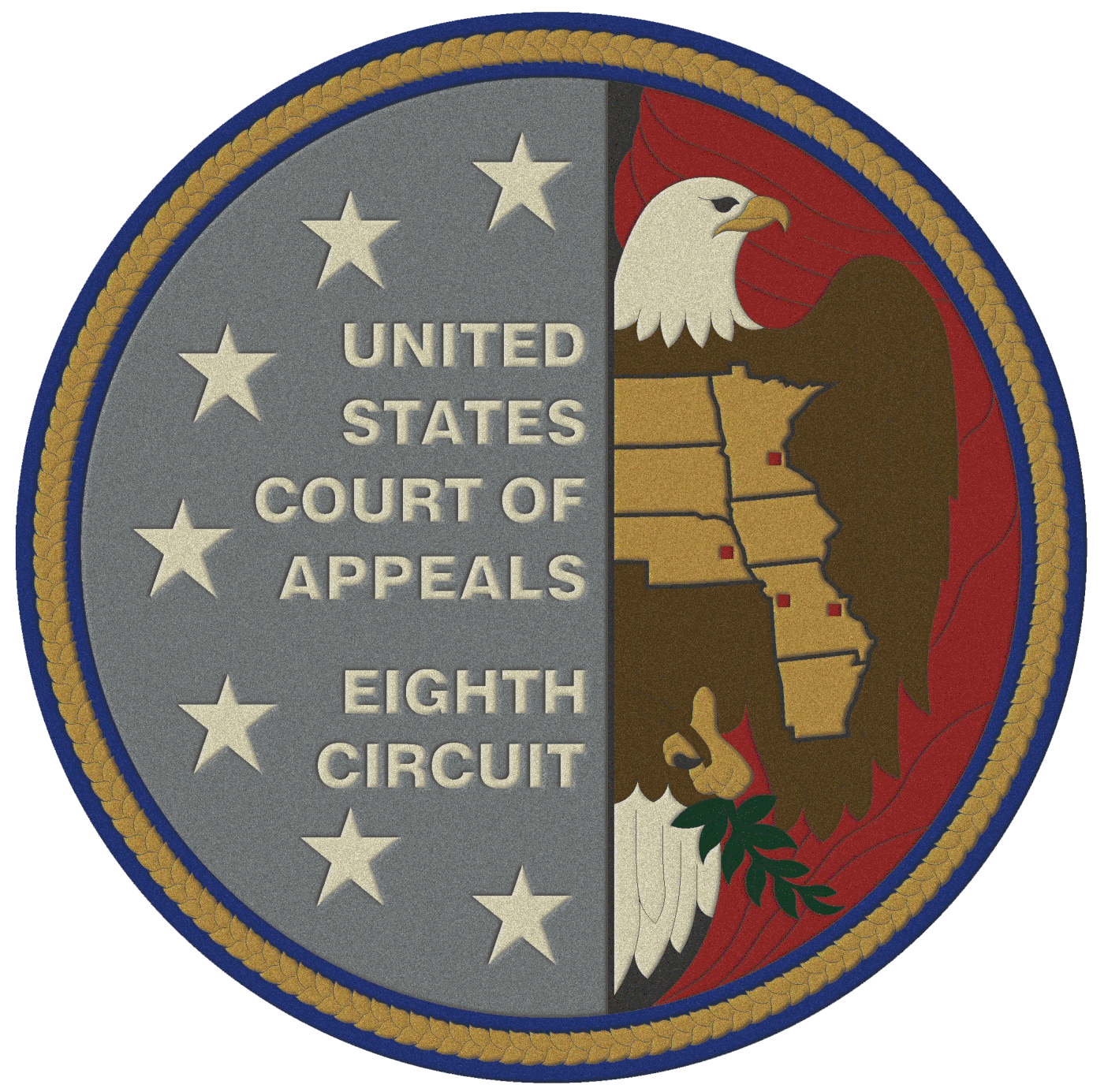
- Court: United States Court of Appeals for the Eighth Circuit
- Full case name: William King Jackson, et al, v. O. E. Bishop, Superintendent of the Arkansas State Penitentiary
- Decided: December 9, 1968
- Citation: 404 F.2d 571 (8th Cir. 1968)

Case history
- Prior history: Judges Gordon Elmo Young and Oren Harris consolidated three prisoners' actions and granted relief against "[t]he use of any such devices as the crank telephone or teeter board," against "[t]he application of any whipping to the bare skin of prisoners," and restrained the use of the strap "until additional rules and regulations are promulgated with appropriate safeguards." Jackson v. Bishop, 268 F. Supp. 804 (E.D. Ark. 1967).

Court membership
- Judges sitting: Martin Donald Van Oosterhout, Harry Blackmun, Robert Van Pelt (D. Neb.)

Laws applied
- Eighth Amendment

Jackson v. Bishop, 404 F.2d 571 (8th Cir. 1968) was a case decided in 1968 on the Eighth Circuit Court of Appeals of the United States by then-judge Harry Blackmun. It abolished corporal punishment in the Arkansas prison system.

== Issue ==
The issue in the case was how to apply the Eighth Amendment's prohibition against cruel and unusual punishment to the conditions within a prison.

== Background ==
Arkansas rules authorized prison officials to beat inmates with a five-foot leather strap known as a "bull hide." An earlier suit had resulted in a decision permitting the use of the strap, provided that "appropriate safeguards" were in place.

== Blackmun's writings ==
Few precedents had existed for applying the Eighth Amendment to prison conditions. In pre-opinion writings, Blackmun wrote that constitutional standards evolve, as opposed to remaining static; He noted that nearly every state had abandoned corporal punishment in prison. Blackmun supported banning corporal punishment in prisons entirely.

== Opinion ==
Blackmun held that use of the strap in question is punishment that "runs afoul" of the Eighth Amendment. He wrote that "any so-called safeguard is entirely unworkable" and that the strap "is abhorrent to public opinion."

== Reception ==
Blackmun's opinion received favorable notice from both the judicial and public communities.
