= Weems v. United States =

- Supreme Court of the United States

Argued November 30 – December 1, 1909 Decided May 2, 1910
- Full case name: Paul A. Weems v. United States
- Citations: 217 U.S. 349 (more) 30 S. Ct. 544; 54 L. Ed. 793; 1910 U.S. LEXIS 1966

Case history
- Prior: Error to the Supreme Court of the Philippine Islands

Holding
- A sentence imposed for fraud of 15 years in prison including being chained from wrist to ankle and compelled to work at "hard and painful labor" is an unconstitutional cruel and unusual punishment.

Court membership
- Chief Justice Melville Fuller Associate Justices John M. Harlan · Edward D. White; Joseph McKenna · Oliver W. Holmes Jr. William R. Day · William H. Moody; Horace H. Lurton

Case opinions
- Majority: McKenna, joined by Fuller, Harlan, Day
- Dissent: White, joined by Holmes
- Moody and Lurton took no part in the consideration or decision of the case.

Laws applied
- Eighth Amendment to the United States Constitution

Weems v. United States, 217 U.S. 349 (1910), was a decision of the United States Supreme Court. It is primarily notable as it pertains to the prohibition of cruel and unusual punishment. It is cited concerning the political and legal relationship between the United States and the Philippines, which at that time was considered a U.S. colony (see Philippine–American War for more information).

The decision stated that the definition of what constitutes a "cruel and unusual" punishment is not tied to narrow historic interpretations.

== Background ==
Paul A. Weems, plaintiff in error, was a disbursing officer of the Bureau of Coast Guard and Transportation. He was charged, in the Philippine courts, with falsifying a public and official document for the purposes of defrauding the government. He was convicted of this and sentenced to 15 years incarceration, and a fine of 4,000 Philippine pesos. The conviction and sentence was upheld by the Supreme Court of the Philippine Islands. Weems filed a demurrer to the charges, but this was overruled as well.

Weems filed a writ of error with the U.S. Supreme Court, claiming that the charges against him were improper, and his conviction should, therefore, be overruled.

== Arguments ==
The argument brought by the plaintiff contained four points, one of which was abandoned due to a mistake of fact. The abandoned point was that the record did not state that Weems was arraigned, that he issued a plea to the complaint upon his demurrer being overruled, and that he was "ordered to plead to the complaint."

The three points that the plaintiff actually argued are as follows:

- First, the Philippine court was in error when it overruled Weems' demurrer. This point is based on the plaintiff being described as a "disbursing officer of the Bureau of Coast Guard and Transportation of the Philippine Islands," a body politic which does not exist.
- Second, the record did not demonstrate that Weems was present when he was tried, or that he was actually in court at any time.
- Third, the Philippine court's sentence of 15 years in prison constituted cruel and unusual punishment, necessitating a reversal of the judgment.

== Decision ==
Justice McKenna delivered the opinion of the court, joined by Chief Justice Fuller and Justices Harlan and Day. Justice Lurton, who had not been a member of the Court when the case had been argued, did not take part in the decision. Justice Moody was absent on account of sickness and Justice Brewer died before the opinion was delivered.

The Court determined that the plaintiff's first assignment of error was incorrect. The opinion cited acts of U.S. Congress and the Philippine Commission as indicating that their respective governments, while politically connected in important ways, were separate and distinct entities. The Court specifically cites the Philippine Criminal Code of Procedure, which, in part, requires that charges be, "in such form as to enable a person of common understanding to know what is intended," and that no trial, judgment, or other proceeding can, "be affected, by reason of a defect in matter of form which does not tend to prejudice a substantial right of the defendant upon the merits."

Addressing the second and third points of the plaintiff's argument simultaneously, the Court determined that the sentence of 15 years in prison was unconstitutionally cruel and unusual. In particular, the Court noted that the conditions of incarceration specifically included being chained from wrist to ankle and compelled to work at "hard and painful labor." Citing a line of cases related to 8th Amendment concerns, the Court demonstrated also that such a severe penalty for so relatively minor a crime was impermissible. In fact, the Court stated that even if the least severe form of punishment statutorily allowed for this crime had been ordered, this would have been "repugnant to the Bill of Rights." Stating that the fault was in the law itself, and seeing no other applicable law under which Weems could be sentenced, the Court ordered the judgment reversed, with directions to dismiss the charges entirely.

== Dissent ==
Justice White wrote a dissenting opinion, with which Justice Holmes concurred. The dissenters asserted that constitutional provisions should not be allowed to "progress" so as to include what they were not intended to include. Regarding the particular constitutional provision in question, the dissenters characterized the Court's opinion as follows: "the clause against cruel punishments, which was intended to prohibit inhumane and barbarous bodily punishments, is so construed as to limit the discretion of the lawmaking power in determining the mere severity with which punishments not of the prohibited character may be prescribed." Justices White and Holmes did not object to extending the Eighth Amendment so as to ban newly devised bodily punishments that are inhumane and barbarous; instead they contended that "the prohibition against the infliction of cruel bodily torture cannot be extended so as to limit legislative discretion in prescribing punishment for crime by modes and methods which are not embraced within the prohibition against cruel bodily punishment."

== Citation regarding 'Enduring Constitutional Rights', including privacy ==
Prior to this case, there was some consensus that the effect of the Eighth Amendment was somewhat limited to its historical origin in preventing the literal torture that was common in England and Colonial America. However, part of this case's reasoning was that the nature of "cruel and unusual punishment" was not defined by any one theory or any one point in time. The Court said:

Legislation, both statutory and constitutional, is enacted, it is true, from an experience of evils but its general language should not, therefore, be necessarily confined to the form that evil had theretofore taken. Time works changes, brings into existence new conditions and purposes. Therefore a principle to be vital must be capable of wider application than the mischief which gave it birth. This is peculiarly true of Constitutions. They are not ephemeral enactments, designed to meet passing occasions. They are, to use the words of Chief Justice Marshall, "designed to approach immortality as nearly as human institutions can approach it."

== See also ==
- List of United States Supreme Court cases, volume 217
- Cadena temporal
