= Harmelin v. Michigan =

- Supreme Court of the United States

Argued November 5, 1990 Decided June 27, 1991
- Full case name: Ronald Allen Harmelin v. State of Michigan
- Citations: 501 U.S. 957 (more) 111 S. Ct. 2680; 115 L. Ed. 2d 836; 1991 U.S. LEXIS 3816

Case history
- Prior: Defendant convicted, sentenced; aff'd, People v. Harmelin, 440 N.W.2d 75 (Mich. App. 1989); appeal denied, 434 Mich. 863 (1990); cert. granted, 495 U.S. 956 (1990).

Holding
- Harmelin's sentence, although harsh, does not violate the Eighth Amendment's Cruel and Unusual Punishment Clause; the Clause's individualized sentencing requirement, which evolved in the context of the Court's capital sentencing jurisprudence, does not apply to noncapital crimes.

Court membership
- Chief Justice William Rehnquist Associate Justices Byron White · Thurgood Marshall; Harry Blackmun · John P. Stevens; Sandra Day O'Connor · Antonin Scalia; Anthony Kennedy · David Souter

Case opinions
- Majority: Scalia (part IV), joined by Rehnquist, O'Connor, Kennedy, Souter
- Plurality: Scalia (parts I, II, III), joined by Rehnquist
- Concurrence: Kennedy, joined by O'Connor, Souter
- Dissent: White, joined by Blackmun, Stevens
- Dissent: Stevens, joined by Blackmun
- Dissent: Marshall

Laws applied
- U.S. Const. amends. VIII, XIV; Mich. Comp. Laws Ann. § 333.7403(2)(a)(i)

Harmelin v. Michigan, 501 U.S. 957 (1991), was a case decided by the Supreme Court of the United States under the Eighth Amendment to the United States Constitution. The Court ruled that the Eighth Amendment's Cruel and Unusual Punishment Clause allowed a state to impose a life sentence without the possibility of parole for the possession of 672 grams (23.70 oz) of cocaine.

The Court's narrow ruling left a major question of Eighth Amendment law unresolved. Since the Court's decision in Gregg v. Georgia, the Court had incorporated a detailed proportionality analysis into the cruel and unusual punishment analysis required in capital cases. The defendant Ronald Harmelin directly asked the Court to extend the reach of that analysis to noncapital cases such as his. Although five Justices agreed that Harmelin's sentence was not unconstitutionally cruel and unusual, six Justices agreed that the Cruel and Unusual Punishment Clause bore some kind of proportionality analysis. Yet among those six, three supported a proportionality principle that is highly deferential to legislative judgments, while three others supported a more searching proportionality analysis that would have struck down Michigan's mandatory life-without-parole sentence for possessing more than 650 grams (22.93 oz) of cocaine (672 grams or 23.70 ounces).

The State of Michigan was represented by Richard Thompson and Michael Modelski. Thompson's other credits include serving as a prosecutor of Dr. Jack Kevorkian. Various state attorneys general, as well as the United States Solicitor General, filed amicus curiae briefs on behalf of the State of Michigan. The Court-appointed counsel for Harmelin, the ACLU and a group of criminal defense attorneys filed briefs in support of the defendant's position.

== The majority ruling ==
The only aspect of the decision that garnered the vote of five Justices was the ultimate conclusion that the mandatory life without parole sentence required by the Michigan law forbidding the possession of more than 650 grams of cocaine was not cruel and unusual punishment. "Severe, mandatory penalties may be cruel, but they are not unusual in the constitutional sense, having been employed in various forms throughout our Nation's history." Nor did the Eighth Amendment require a sentencing court to consider mitigating factors in noncapital cases. It was enough that Michigan law allowed for executive clemency, or that the legislature might at some later date retroactively reduce the sentence for Harmelin's crime.

== The proportionality debate ==
The Justices could not agree, however, whether and to what extent the Eighth Amendment imposed a proportionality requirement in noncapital sentencing proceedings. Justice Antonin Scalia, as is typical of his originalist interpretation of the Constitution, introduced historical evidence in support of his argument that the Eighth Amendment imposes no proportionality requirement at all. Justice Anthony Kennedy argued in favor of a vague proportionality principle that allowed the Court to uphold Harmelin's sentence. And Justice Byron White argued that Harmelin's sentence was the sort of "excessive" sentence forbidden by the Eighth Amendment.

=== Scalia's originalist argument ===
Through his opinion in Harmelin, Justice Scalia voiced his disagreement with the Court's decision in Solem v. Helm, 463 U.S. 277 (1983), which was decided before he was appointed to the Court. He first identified the English Bill of Rights of 1689 as the source of the Eighth Amendment's ban on cruel and unusual punishment. According to Scalia, Solem assumed that the Americans who adopted the Eighth Amendment in 1791 understood that language in the same way as the English of 1689. Scalia disputed this hypothesis. He pointed to a dispute among historians about which royal abuses the Declaration was intended to combat. Some historians contend that these abuses were the harsh punishments for treason—drawing and quartering, beheading, disemboweling—meted out by the Bloody Assizes. Other historians contend that the Declaration was meant to rein in the enormously arbitrary sentencing power the king had exercised in sentencing a notorious perjurer. Regardless, Scalia argued that those who wrote the Declaration considered a punishment to be "cruel and unusual" only if it were outside of the judge's power to impose. The phrase "'cruel and unusual' is treated as interchangeable with 'cruel and illegal.'" For this reason, the English of the 17th century did not believe a "cruel and unusual" punishment was a disproportionate one.

For Scalia, though, the more important question was what the words "cruel and unusual" meant to the Framers of the Bill of Rights in 1791 when the Eighth Amendment was adopted. "Even if one assumes that the Founders knew the precise meaning of that English antecedent..., a direct transplant of the English meaning to the soil of American constitutionalism would in any case have been impossible." Because federal common law incorporated no common-law crimes, the Framers could only have meant to check legislative power. They understood the word "unusual" to refer to things that were "not regularly or customarily employed." Furthermore, if the Framers had meant to outlaw 'disproportional' punishments, they would have used that word, as many contemporary state constitutions did. "There is little doubt that those who framed, proposed, and ratified the Bill of Rights were aware of such provisions [outlawing disproportional punishments], yet chose not to replicate them." Finally, the scant direct evidence available from state ratifying conventions confirmed for Scalia the view that an "unusual punishment" was a particular mode of punishment that was infrequently imposed, not one that was excessively lengthy in comparison to other punishments imposed for similar crimes.

For these reasons, Scalia argued that the proportionality test from Solem should be overruled. Solem had held that a particular punishment was unconstitutionally disproportional if (1) the crime was relatively minor in comparison to the punishment, (2) the sentence imposed in the jurisdiction for similarly grave offenses was less, and (3) other jurisdictions impose a lesser sentence for the same crime. Scalia argued that (1) it was difficult to assess the gravity of a particular crime, and thus (2) it would be difficult to determine whether similarly grave crimes carried a lesser sentence. As for whether other jurisdictions imposed a lesser sentence for the same crime, Scalia conceded that it is easy to figure this out, but that this inquiry has "no conceivable relevance to the Eighth Amendment." If a mode of punishment was "unusual" because it was infrequently imposed, the three factors of the Solem test hardly mattered to Scalia. In a federal system, moreover, some state will always have the distinction of imposing the harshest punishment for a particular crime. "The Eighth Amendment is not a ratchet, whereby a temporary consensus on leniency for a particular crime fixes a permanent constitutional maximum, disabling the States from giving effect to altered beliefs and responding to changed social conditions." Because the proportionality requirement was of recent vintage, "issued 185 years after the Eighth Amendment was adopted," and then only in capital cases, Scalia reasoned it should be abandoned entirely, or at least limited only to capital cases.

=== White's proportionality argument ===
Justice White's point of departure was that "the Amendment does not refer to proportionality in so many words, but it does forbid 'excessive' fines, a restraint that suggests that a determination of excessiveness should be based at least in part on whether the fine imposed is disproportionate to the crime committed." Accordingly, the Eighth Amendment imposed a strong proportionality requirement not simply on fines, but on all criminal punishments, including prison terms.

White took issue with three premises of Scalia's argument. First, for White, the fact that the Framers were not as plain-spoken as Scalia would have preferred was no obstacle to concluding that the Eighth Amendment did indeed contain a proportionality requirement. Second, although the newly formed federal government did not, in 1791, have any "track record with respect to criminal law," they had lived under the regime of the several states for some time, and so there would be some benchmarks by which to evaluate proportionality of punishments. Third, even if the original understanding of the Eighth Amendment did not include a proportionality requirement, 20th-century decisions of the Court had imposed one. White takes Scalia to task for claiming at once that the Eighth Amendment must have no proportionality guarantee whatsoever and then that that guarantee can apply only in capital cases.

White's argument proceeds from the premise that "the scope of the prohibition against cruel and unusual punishments has long understood the limitations of a purely historical analysis." In other words, when it comes to the Eighth Amendment, the Court must employ a flexible and dynamic interpretation.

The Court therefore has recognized that a punishment may violate the Eighth Amendment if it is contrary to the evolving standards of decency that mark the progress of a maturing society. In evaluating a punishment under this test, we have looked not to our own conceptions of decency, but to those of modern American society as a whole in determining what standards have evolved, and thus have focused not on the subjective views of individual Justices, but on objective factors to the maximum possible extent." It is this type of objective factor which forms the basis for the tripartite proportionality analysis set forth in Solem.

Finally, White argued that the Solem test works well in practice. Simply because courts will be reviewing sentences for proportionality does not mean that courts will strike them down with great frequency. Solem requires a certain amount of deference to the legislature, and courts have proven able to apply that amount of deference. And although Scalia concedes that an egregious prison term—such as life in prison for overtime parking—would be unconstitutional, White faults him for striking such extreme punishments down in a principled manner. White also argues that adopting Scalia's view of the proportionality requirement would strike at the foundation of the Court's capital punishment jurisprudence, much of which would then "rest on quicksand".

=== Kennedy's "narrow proportionality principle" ===
Justice Kennedy, joined by Justices O'Connor and Souter, attempted to forge a middle ground between the positions of Justices Scalia and White. Justice Kennedy argued that "stare decisis counsels our adherence to the narrow proportionality principle that has existed in our Eighth Amendment jurisprudence for 80 years." Under Kennedy's formulation of the proportionality principle, Harmelin's sentence could stand, along with the possibility that an equally harsh sentence for a less severe crime might not.

As an initial matter, Kennedy identified four principles that undergird the Eighth Amendment's proportionality principle as he understood it. First, "the fixing of prison terms for specific crimes involves a substantive penological judgment that, as a general matter, is properly within the province of legislatures, not courts." Second, the Eighth Amendment does not mandate the adoption of one theory of punishment over another—states are free to tailor their punishments to meet the needs of either a deterrence rationale, a retribution rationale, or both or some other rationale. Third, in light of these first two principles, there is bound to be some variation of punishments between and within particular jurisdictions. Thus, the intra- and interjurisdictional comparison required by the Solem test would frequently prove unworkable. Fourth, any proportionality analysis required by the Eighth Amendment should be informed by objective factors to the maximum possible extent.

Justice Kennedy pointed to the two aspects of Harmelin's sentence that might cause difficulty under the Eighth Amendment—the severity of the sentence, along with its mandatory nature. Life without parole is the second most severe sentence known to American law, after the death penalty. Yet Harmelin's crime was more severe than the crime at issue in Solem. In Solem, the Court struck down a life-without-parole sentence imposed for the crime of uttering a no-account check; Harmelin, however, was convicted of possessing 650 grams of cocaine. Uttering is "one of the most passive felonies a person could commit." The illegal drug trade, by contrast, begets a tremendous amount of violence. In view of these observations, a legislature could rationally conclude that a life sentence without parole is appropriate to deter others from distributing cocaine and to achieve an appropriate amount of retribution. Because Harmelin's crime was more serious than the crimes involved in other cases where the Court had confronted the constitutionality of a life sentence, Kennedy reasoned that it might be appropriate to dispense with the detailed Solem analysis. "A better reading of our cases leads to the conclusion that intrajurisdictional and interjurisdictional analyses are appropriate only in the rare case in which a threshold comparison of the crime committed and the sentence imposed leads to an inference of gross disproportionality."

The mandatory nature of Harmelin's sentence also did not require setting it aside. First, as Scalia agreed, the Eighth Amendment did not require the trial court to allow Harmelin to present mitigating evidence. Second, if the Court were to set Harmelin's sentence aside, it would necessarily have to reject the judgment of the legislature, where the initial responsibility for making the substantive judgment about appropriate punishments rests. Third, Michigan's system did not entirely lack mechanisms for considering the individual circumstances of a particular defendant. Prosecutors have discretion in bringing charges, the governor has the power to grant clemency post hoc, and the legislature has the power to retroactively modify the sentence for all persons convicted of Harmelin's crime.

==== White's criticism of Kennedy's argument ====
For Justice White, Kennedy's narrow proportionality principle effectively "eviscerates" Solem, leaving only an "empty shell" in its place. How could the inter- and intrajurisdictional comparisons required by Solem be anything but objective? And if, as Kennedy conceded, proportionality analysis should be informed by objective factors as much as possible, how else could those objective factors come into play except through the Solem test? See the lengthy discussion in support of the Solem test in chapters 1 and 2 in Dennis J. Baker, The Right Not to be Criminalized: Demarcating Criminal Law's Authority (Ashgate, 2011)

Because White disagreed that Solem should be abandoned, he proceeded to apply it to Harmelin's sentence, and concluded that Harmelin's sentence was unconstitutional. First, because Michigan has no death penalty, the life-without-parole sentence for possession of 650 grams or 22.93 ounces of cocaine was the most severe available under Michigan law. Second, it reserved the sentence for only one other crime—first-degree murder. Third, no other jurisdiction imposed such a severe sentence for possession of 650 grams of cocaine. Alabama came close, White observed, but only when the defendant possessed 10 kilograms or 22 pounds of cocaine. Thus, White concluded, Solem required the Court to strike down Harmelin's sentence.

=== Aftermath ===
Even though the "650 lifer" law was ruled constitutional by SCOTUS, it remained controversial. In 1998, the Michigan legislature revised the law to make "650-lifer" offenders eligible for parole after 17–20 years in prison. The change was applied retroactively to people like Harmelin who were convicted before 1998.

An obituary says that a person named Ronald A. Harmelin, seemingly the same person in the Harmelin v Michigan case, died on November 6, 2000 at the age of 55. Because Harmelin began his prison term in 1986, he would have served 14 years in prison and still been 3-6 years away from parole eligibility at the time he died.

== See also ==
- List of United States Supreme Court cases, volume 501
- List of United States Supreme Court cases
- Lists of United States Supreme Court cases by volume
- List of United States Supreme Court cases by the Rehnquist Court
