= Discipline (disambiguation) =

Discipline is any training intended to produce a specific character or pattern of behaviour.

Discipline may also refer to:

== General ==
- Discipline (academia), a specific branch of knowledge, learning and practice, such as an academic or professional discipline
- Discipline (BDSM), an element of BDSM
- Disciplinary procedure, censure under rules of assembly
- Punishment, an imposition of something negative on a person or animal in response to behavior deemed wrong
- Military discipline, the ability and willingness of a military's soldiery to follow orders and act as commanded.

== Christianity ==
- Church discipline, a response of an ecclesiastical body to an offence against its standards of belief or conduct committed by a member of that body
- Discipline (mortification), a type of scourge used in the Christian spiritual discipline known as the mortification of the flesh

== Music ==
- Discipline (band), an independent rock band from Detroit
- The Disciplines, a Norwegian garage-rock band
- Discipline, the name of a mid-1981 line-up of King Crimson
- Discipline GM, an independent record label founded by Robert Fripp

=== Albums ===
- Discipline (Cadaver Inc. album)
- Discipline (Desmond Child album)
- Discipline (Janet Jackson album)
- Discipline (King Crimson album)
- Discipline (Kompressor album)

=== Songs ===
- "Discipline" (instrumental), by King Crimson
- "Discipline" (Nine Inch Nails song)
- "Discipline" (Throbbing Gristle song)
- "Discipline", a song by Cadaver Inc. from their album of the same name
- "Discipline", a song by Desmond Child from his album of the same name
- "Discipline", a song by Gang Starr from Full Clip: A Decade of Gang Starr
- "Discipline", a song by Janet Jackson from her album of the same name
- "Discipline", a song by Orelsan from La fête est finie - Épilogue

== Novels ==
- Discipline, a 1814 novel by Mary Brunton
- Discipline (novel), a 2025 novel by Randa Abdel-Fattah

== See also ==
- Disciple (disambiguation)
- Disciplina, a minor Roman deity who is the personification of discipline.
- List of academic disciplines
- Self control, an ability to control one's emotions, behavior and desires in order to obtain some reward later
