= Rummel v. Estelle =

- Supreme Court of the United States

Argued January 7, 1980 Decided March 18, 1980
- Full case name: William James Rummel v. Estelle, Corrections Director
- Citations: 445 U.S. 263 (more) 100 S. Ct. 1133; 63 L. Ed. 2d 382; 1980 U.S. LEXIS 90

Holding
- The Texas state court's decision was affirmed, that life in prison with possibility of parole is not cruel and unusual punishment for a habitual offender convicted of passing bad checks.

Court membership
- Chief Justice Warren E. Burger Associate Justices William J. Brennan Jr. · Potter Stewart; Byron White · Thurgood Marshall; Harry Blackmun · Lewis F. Powell Jr. William Rehnquist · John P. Stevens

Case opinions
- Majority: Rehnquist, joined by Burger, Stewart, White, Blackmun
- Concurrence: Stewart
- Dissent: Powell, joined by Brennan, Marshall, Stevens

Rummel v. Estelle, 445 U.S. 263 (1980), (sometimes erroneously cited as Rummel v. Estell) was a United States Supreme Court case in which the Court upheld a life sentence with the possibility of parole under Texas' three strikes law for a felony fraud crime, where the offense and the defendant's two prior offenses involved approximately $230 of fraudulent activity (worth $847 in 2023 dollars, or about four 40-hour weeks at the contemporary Texas minimum wage of $1.40/hour).

== Background ==
Defendant William James Rummel had, prior to the offense in question, twice pleaded guilty to felony charges involving property:

- In 1964, Rummel pleaded guilty to fraudulent use of a credit card to obtain $80 worth of goods or services. As the amount in question exceeded $50, under Texas law the offense was classified as a felony punishable by 2–10 years in the (then called) Texas Department of Corrections (TDC). Rummel was sentenced to three years.
- In 1969, Rummel pleaded guilty to passing a forged check in the amount of $28.36. The offense was classified as a felony by 2–5 years in the TDC. Rummel was sentenced to four years.

The third offense, in 1973, involved Rummel refusing to return $120.75 received as payment for repairs of an air conditioning unit that were not performed at all. By itself, the crime was designated as "felony theft" and punishable by 2–10 years in the TDC. However, the prosecution sought to enhance the sentence under Texas' three strikes law, citing the 1964 and 1969 convictions as proof of Rummel's being a repeat offender; the law required a mandatory sentence of life with the possibility of parole if the enhancement allegation were found to be true.

A jury found Rummel guilty of felony theft and also found as true the allegation that Rummel had been convicted of two prior felonies; the trial court imposed the mandatory sentence in accordance with the law.

== Prior appeals ==
The Texas appellate courts rejected Rummel's appeal of the conviction as well as subsequent collateral attacks on his sentence. Rummel then filed a federal habeas corpus petition in the United States District Court for the Western District of Texas, which also denied relief, on the basis that the Supreme Court had already ruled on the constitutionality of Texas' three strikes law, as well as agreeing with the State that the sentence was not truly "life" as Rummel would be eligible for parole in 12 years.

However, a divided panel of the United States Court of Appeals for the Fifth Circuit reversed the sentence on grounds that it "was 'so grossly disproportionate' to his offenses as to constitute cruel and unusual punishment." But the Court of Appeals sitting en banc reversed the panel's ruling, on the basis that Rummel would be eligible for parole; six judges dissented on the basis that Rummel had no enforceable right to parole and that prior Supreme Court rulings mandated overturning the sentence.

== Opinions of the Court ==
=== Majority opinion ===
Justice Rehnquist delivered the Court opinion affirming Rummel's life sentence.

At the outset, Rehnquist noted that Rummel did not challenge the general constitutionality of the three strikes law, only its application to his case, nor did Rummel challenge the classification of his current offense or either of his prior two offenses as felonies.

The Court then noted that in Graham v. West Virginia, a 1912 case which involved an individual convicted of three separate counts of horse thievery totaling $235 (only slightly more than the $230 total of Rummel's three offenses), Graham's life sentence was upheld.

Rummel then attempted to challenge his sentence "on an alleged 'nationwide' trend away from mandatory life sentences and toward 'lighter, discretionary sentences'", and provided "detailed charts and tables documenting the history of recidivist statutes in the United States since 1776" in an attempt to show that "[n]o jurisdiction in the United States or the Free World punishes habitual offenders as harshly as Texas." The Court noted, however, that Washington and West Virginia also imposed mandatory life sentences for habitual offenders, so Texas was not as harsh as other states.

The Court also noted that, although Rummel had no Constitutional right to a parole of his sentence, Texas had "a relatively liberal policy of granting "good time" credits to its prisoners, a policy that historically has allowed a prisoner serving a life sentence to become eligible for parole in as little as 12 years." The Court noted that this sentence was still not as harsh as Mississippi law, which imposed a life without parole sentence for three felony convictions where one was a violent felony, and upheld it.

=== Concurring opinion ===
Justice Stewart (who also joined the majority opinion) noted that "[i]f the Constitution gave me a roving commission to impose upon the criminal courts of Texas my own notions of enlightened policy, I would not join the Court's opinion", indicating that he would not have upheld the sentence. However, as the question posed was "whether those procedures fall below the minimum level the [Constitution] will tolerate", Justice Stewart was "constrained to join the opinion and judgment of the Court."

=== Dissenting opinion ===
Justice Powell delivered a dissenting opinion, arguing that "(i) the penalty for a noncapital offense may be unconstitutionally disproportionate, (ii) the possibility of parole should not be considered in assessing the nature of the punishment, (iii) a mandatory life sentence is grossly disproportionate as applied to petitioner, and (iv) the conclusion that this petitioner has suffered a violation of his Eighth Amendment rights is compatible with principles of judicial restraint and federalism."

Justice Powell focused the majority of his dissent on the second and third points. He noted that prior Court opinions ruled that prisoners had no Constitutional right to parole; thus, consideration of the possibility of parole should not be considered in determining whether a sentence was disproportionate. Justice Powell noted that "parole is simply an act of executive grace", and that in June 1979, the Governor of Texas refused to grant parole to 79% of state prisoners for which the parole board recommended release.

Justice Powell also noted that 3/4 of the state legislatures had never instituted a three strikes law imposing a mandatory life sentence for two or more nonviolent offenses, and of the 12 states that had, only three (Texas, West Virginia, and Washington) still retained the law. Specifically, Justice Powell noted that the states of Kansas and Kentucky changed their laws to a more flexible sentencing scheme. Justice Powell also noted that the federal habitual offender law also did not impose a mandatory life sentence.

== Subsequent events ==
Rummel later filed another habeas corpus challenge to his sentence, this time claiming ineffective assistance of counsel. On October 3, 1980, the United States District Court for the Western District of Texas granted Rummel's petition for a writ of habeas corpus on the grounds of ineffective assistance of counsel. Rummel then pleaded guilty to theft by false pretenses. He was sentenced to time served under the terms of a plea-bargaining agreement on November 14, 1980 and released.

Texas would later amend its three strikes law to remove the mandatory life imprisonment rule, changing it to permit a jury to return a sentence of life (with the possibility of parole) or a sentence of a term between 25 and 99 years.

The Rummel case is commonly used by Texas courts as a proportionality test (if requested on appeal, usually by the defendant) to determine whether, under the Eighth Amendment, a sentence is excessive. Almost always the ruling is that a sentence is not excessive, given that Rummel's life sentence for a small felony conviction which only involved misappropriation of a small amount of property, enhanced by his two prior convictions both involving similar offenses and both involving small amounts of property, was upheld by the United States Supreme Court. The case has also been used by Federal courts for proportionality test purposes, again with usually the same ruling that the sentence is not excessive.

== See also ==
- Three strikes law
- Capital punishment
- Eighth Amendment to the United States Constitution
