= Solem v. Helm =

- Supreme Court of the United States

Argued March 29, 1983 Decided June 28, 1983
- Full case name: Solem, Warden, South Dakota State Penitentiary v. Helm
- Citations: 463 U.S. 277 (more) 103 S. Ct. 3001; 77 L. Ed. 2d 637

Case history
- Prior: Helm v. Solem, 684 F.2d 582 (8th Cir. 1982), cert. granted, 459 U.S. 986 (1982).

Holding
- The Eighth Amendment's prohibition on cruel and unusual punishments prohibits not only barbaric punishments, but also sentences that are grossly disproportionate to the crime.

Court membership
- Chief Justice Warren E. Burger Associate Justices William J. Brennan Jr. · Byron White; Thurgood Marshall · Harry Blackmun; Lewis F. Powell Jr. · William Rehnquist; John P. Stevens · Sandra Day O'Connor

Case opinions
- Majority: Powell, joined by Brennan, Marshall, Blackmun, Stevens
- Dissent: Burger, joined by White, Rehnquist, O'Connor

Laws applied
- U.S. Const. amend. VIII

Solem v. Helm, 463 U.S. 277 (1983), was a United States Supreme Court case concerned with the scope of the Eighth Amendment protection from cruel and unusual punishment. Mr. Helm, who had written a check from a fictitious account and had reached his seventh nonviolent felony conviction since 1964, received a mandatory sentence, under South Dakota law at that time, to life in prison with no parole. Petitioner Mr. Solem was the warden of the South Dakota State Penitentiary at the time.

The Court overturned the sentence on the grounds that it was "cruel and unusual". Justice Powell wrote for the five-member majority, while Chief Justice Burger wrote for the four-member dissent. Justice Powell reasoned that Helm had "received the penultimate sentence for relatively minor criminal conduct." Chief Justice Burger's concerns reflected his strict constructionist attitude: "Suppose several states punish severely a crime that the Court views as trivial or petty? I can see no limiting principle in the Court's holding."

The language of the opinion, however, refrained from striking down state statutes setting minimum sentencing guidelines for recidivism. The majority opinion only called for exceptions to the statutes protecting the constitutional freedom from cruel and unusual punishment.

In addition, the Court sought to use this particular case to clarify the Proportionality Doctrine previously proposed in Enmund v. Florida (1982) by setting precise guidelines for deciding whether a punishment is proportional to the specific crime committed. The Court ruled that all courts must do three things to decide whether a sentence is proportional to a specific crime:

1. Compare the nature and gravity of the offense and the harshness of the penalty,
2. Compare the sentences imposed on other criminals in the same jurisdiction; i.e., whether more serious crimes are subject to the same penalty or to less serious penalties, and
3. Compare the sentences imposed for commission of the same crime in other jurisdictions.

== See also ==
- List of United States Supreme Court cases, volume 463
