= Lehr v. Robertson =

- Supreme Court of the United States

Decided June 27, 1983
- Full case name: Lehr v. Robertson
- Citations: 463 U.S. 248 (more)

Holding
- The mere existence of a biological link between an unwed father and a child does not merit protection under the Due Process Clause regarding adoption; the unwed father must earn rights under that clause by coming forward and contributing to the child's development.

Court membership
- Chief Justice Warren E. Burger Associate Justices William J. Brennan Jr. · Byron White; Thurgood Marshall · Harry Blackmun; Lewis F. Powell Jr. · William Rehnquist; John P. Stevens · Sandra Day O'Connor

Case opinions
- Majority: Stevens
- Dissent: White, joined by Marshall, Blackmun

Laws applied
- Due Process Clause

Lehr v. Robertson, 463 U.S. 248 (1983), was a United States Supreme Court case in which the court held that the mere existence of a biological link between an unwed father and a child does not merit protection under the Due Process Clause regarding adoption; the unwed father must earn rights under that clause by coming forward and contributing to the child's development.

== Background ==
Lehr was the putative father of a child born out of wedlock. Robertson, mother of the child, married another man after the child was born. Subsequently, when the child was over two years old, the mother filed an adoption petition in the Ulster County, New York Family Court, which entered an order of adoption. Lehr never supported the child or offered to marry the mother, did not enter his name in New York's "putative father registry" (which would have entitled him to notice of the adoption proceeding), and was not in any of the classes of putative fathers who are entitled under New York law to receive notice of adoption proceedings. After the adoption proceeding was commenced, Lehr filed a paternity petition in the Westchester County, New York Family Court. Lehr learned of the pending adoption proceeding several months later. Shortly thereafter, his attorney sought a stay of the adoption proceeding pending the determination of the paternity action, but by that time the Ulster County Family Court had entered the adoption order. Lehr filed a petition to vacate the adoption order on the ground that it was obtained in violation of his rights under the Due Process and Equal Protection Clauses of the Fourteenth Amendment. The Ulster County Family Court denied the petition, and both the Appellate Division of the New York Supreme Court and the New York Court of Appeals affirmed.

== Opinion of the court ==
The Supreme Court issued an opinion on June 27, 1983.

== Later developments ==
In response to Lehr and Michael H. v. Gerald D., a case in which the Supreme Court held that an unwed father need not be recognized as the father if the mother married another man, states adopted statutory schemes to decide the rights of unmarried fathers with regards to the child's adoption. Generally, these statutes require reasonable efforts to identify and notify the putative father. Federal examples of these laws include the Uniform Putative and Unknown Fathers Act of 1988 and the Uniform Adoption Act of 1994.

In some case where the mother actively deceived the father—including the Baby Jessica case and the Baby Richard case—courts have held that the uninvolved father does have constitutional rights in the adoption context.
