= Merrick Garland =

American lawyer and jurist (born 1952)

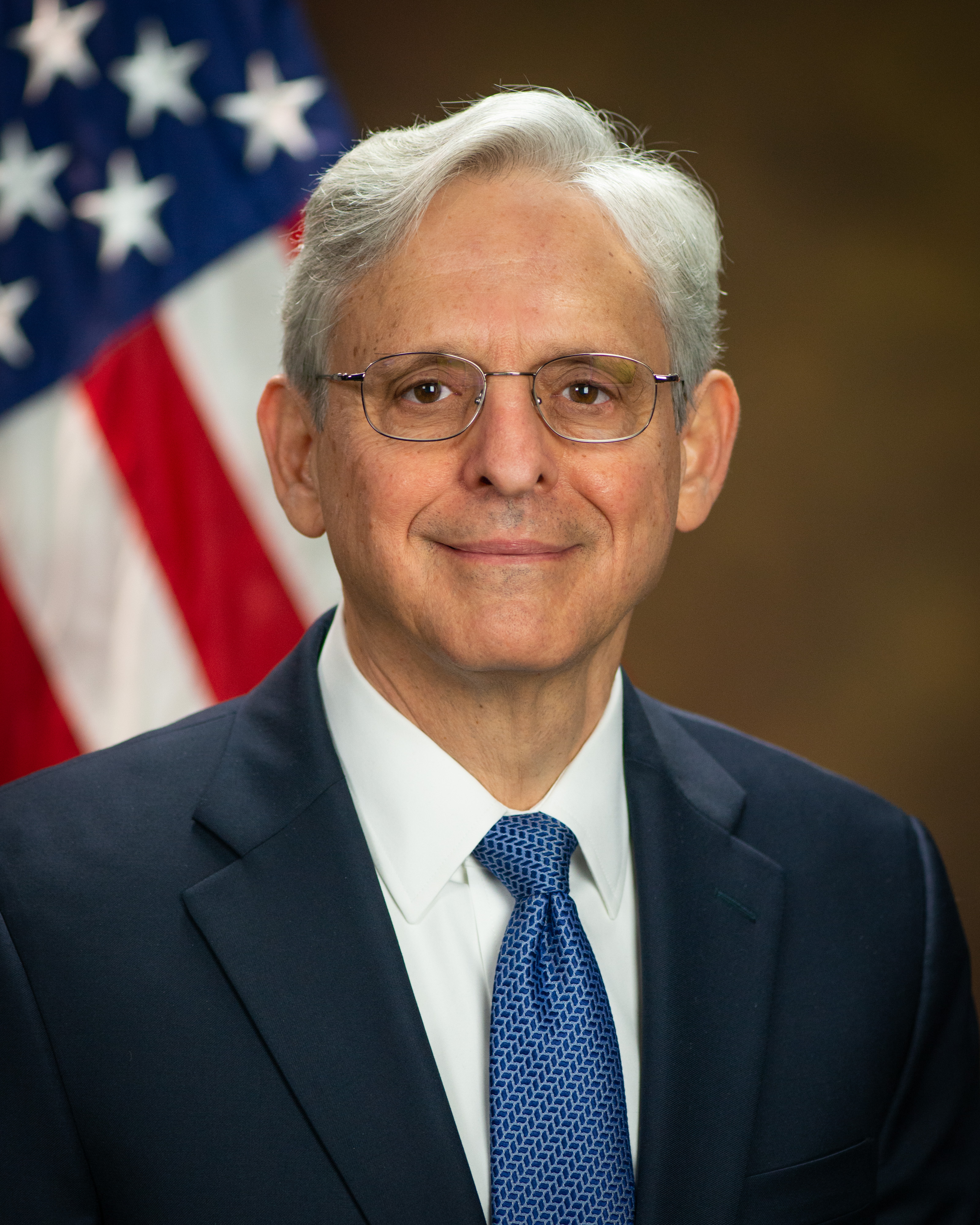
- Official portrait, 2021

86th United States Attorney General
- In office March 11, 2021 – January 20, 2025
- President: Joe Biden
- Deputy: John P. Carlin (acting); Lisa Monaco
- Preceded by: William Barr
- Succeeded by: Pam Bondi

Chief Judge of the United States Court of Appeals for the District of Columbia Circuit
- In office February 12, 2013 – February 11, 2020
- Preceded by: David B. Sentelle
- Succeeded by: Sri Srinivasan

Judge of the United States Court of Appeals for the District of Columbia Circuit
- In office March 20, 1997 – March 11, 2021
- Appointed by: Bill Clinton
- Preceded by: Abner Mikva
- Succeeded by: Ketanji Brown Jackson

Personal details
- Born: Merrick Brian Garland; November 13, 1952 (age 73) Chicago, Illinois, U.S.
- Party: Democratic
- Spouse: Lynn Rosenman (m. 1987)
- Children: 2
- Education: Harvard University (BA, JD)
- Awards: Henry J. Friendly Medal (2022)
- Garland's voice Garland's remarks on the twentieth anniversary of the September 11 attacks. Recorded September 10, 2021

Merrick Brian Garland (born November 13, 1952) is an American lawyer and jurist who served as the 86th United States attorney general from 2021 to 2025. He previously served as a circuit judge of the United States Court of Appeals for the District of Columbia Circuit from 1997 to 2021. In 2016, the U.S. Senate refused to hold a confirmation hearing after President Barack Obama nominated him to the U.S. Supreme Court during a lame duck presidential term limit.

A native of the Chicago area, Garland attended Harvard University and Harvard Law School, where he was an editor of the Harvard Law Review. He served as a law clerk to Judge Henry Friendly of the United States Court of Appeals for the Second Circuit and to U.S. Supreme Court Justice William J. Brennan Jr., and then practiced corporate litigation at Arnold & Porter, after which he worked as a federal prosecutor in the United States Department of Justice, where he supervised the investigation and prosecution of the Oklahoma City bombers. President Bill Clinton appointed Garland to the United States Court of Appeals for the District of Columbia Circuit in 1997, and he served as its chief judge from 2013 to 2020.

President Barack Obama, a Democrat, nominated Garland to serve as an associate justice of the Supreme Court in March 2016 to fill the vacancy created by the death of Antonin Scalia. However, the Republican Senate majority refused to hold a hearing or vote on his nomination. The unprecedented refusal of a Senate majority to consider a Supreme Court nomination was highly controversial. Garland's nomination lasted 293 days (the longest to date), and it expired on January 3, 2017, at the end of the 114th Congress. Eventually, subsequent President Donald Trump, a Republican, nominated Neil Gorsuch to the vacant seat, and the Republican Senate majority confirmed him.

President Joe Biden nominated Garland as U.S. attorney general in January 2021. He was confirmed by the Senate in a 70–30 vote, and took office in March of that same year. During his tenure, Garland was criticized for the pace of the prosecution of President Donald Trump. Some observers, including Biden, assigned Garland some responsibility for the fact that none of the indictments obtained by special counsel Jack Smith went to trial before the November 2024 election in which Trump prevailed and won re-election to a second non-consecutive term leading to all charges against him being dismissed.

== Early life and education ==
Garland was born on November 13, 1952, in Chicago. His mother Shirley (née Horwitz; 1925–2016) was a director of volunteer services at Chicago's Council for Jewish Elderly (now called CJE SeniorLife). His father, Cyril Garland (1915–2000), headed Garland Advertising, a small business run out of the family home. Garland was raised in Conservative Judaism; the family name had been changed from Garfinkel several generations earlier. His grandparents left the Pale of Settlement in the western Russian Empire in the early 20th century, fleeing antisemitic pogroms in what is now Ukraine and Poland. Two of his grandmother's siblings were later murdered in the Holocaust. He is a second cousin of Republican six-term Iowa Governor and former US Ambassador to China Terry Branstad.

Garland grew up in the north Chicago border suburb of Lincolnwood. He attended Niles West High School in Skokie, Illinois, where he was president of the student council, acted in theatrical productions, and was a member of the debate team. He graduated in 1970 as the class valedictorian. Garland was also a Presidential Scholar and National Merit Scholar. He then studied social studies at Harvard University. He initially wanted to become a physician, but soon decided to become a lawyer instead. He allied himself with his future boss, Jamie Gorelick, when he was elected the only freshman member of a campus-wide committee on which Gorelick also served. During his college summers Garland volunteered as a speechwriter to Congressman Abner J. Mikva. After President Jimmy Carter appointed Mikva to the D.C. Circuit, Mikva would rely on Garland when hiring law clerks. At Harvard, Garland wrote news articles and theater reviews for the Harvard Crimson, and was a resident of Quincy House. Garland wrote his 235-page honors thesis on industrial mergers in Britain in the 1960s. Garland graduated from Harvard in 1974 with a Bachelor of Arts in social studies, summa cum laude, and was elected to Phi Beta Kappa.

Garland then attended Harvard Law School, where he was a member of the Harvard Law Review. Garland ran for the presidency of the Law Review but lost to Susan Estrich, so he served as an articles editor instead. As an articles editor, Garland assigned himself to edit a submission by U.S. Supreme Court justice William Brennan on the topic of the role of state constitutions in safeguarding individual rights. This correspondence with Brennan later contributed to his winning a clerkship with the justice. Garland graduated from Harvard Law School in 1977 with a Juris Doctor, magna cum laude.

== Early career ==
After graduating from law school, Garland spent two years as a judicial law clerk, first for Judge Henry Friendly of the U.S. Court of Appeals for the Second Circuit (New York City) from 1977 to 1978 and then for Justice William J. Brennan Jr. of the U.S. Supreme Court from 1978 to 1979. After his clerkships, Garland spent two years as a special assistant to U.S. attorney general Benjamin Civiletti.

After the Carter administration ended in 1981, Garland entered private practice at the law firm Arnold & Porter. Garland practiced mostly corporate litigation, and was made a partner in 1985. In Motor Vehicles Manufacturers Ass'n v. State Farm Mutual Automobile Insurance Co. (1983) Garland acted as counsel to an insurance company suing to reinstate an unpopular automatic seat belt mandate. After winning the case in both the District of Columbia Circuit Court and the Supreme Court, Garland wrote an 87-page Harvard Law Review article describing the way courts use a heightened "hard look" standard of review and scope of review when an agency chooses deregulation, with increasing focus on the fidelity of the agencies' actions to congressional intent. In 1985–86, while at Arnold & Porter, Garland was a lecturer at Harvard Law School, where he taught antitrust law. He also published an article in the Yale Law Journal urging a broader application of antitrust immunity to state and local governments.

Desiring to return to public service and do more trial work, in 1989 Garland became an assistant United States attorney in the U.S. Attorney's Office for the District of Columbia. As a line prosecutor, Garland represented the government in criminal cases ranging from drug trafficking to complex public corruption matters. Garland was one of the three principal prosecutors who handled the investigation into Washington, D.C. Mayor Marion Barry's possession of cocaine.

Garland then briefly returned to Arnold & Porter, working there from 1992 to 1993. In 1993, Garland joined the new Clinton administration as deputy assistant attorney general in the Criminal Division of the United States Department of Justice. The following year, Deputy Attorney General Jamie Gorelick – a key mentor of Garland's – asked Garland to be her principal associate deputy attorney general.

In that role, Garland's responsibilities included the supervision of high-profile domestic-terrorism cases, including the Oklahoma City bombing, Ted Kaczynski (also known as the "Unabomber"), and the Atlanta Olympics bombings. Garland insisted on being sent to Oklahoma City in the aftermath of the attack, in order to examine the crime scene and oversee the investigation in preparation for the prosecution. He represented the government at the preliminary hearings of the two main defendants, Timothy McVeigh and Terry Nichols. Garland offered to lead the trial team, but could not because he was needed at the Justice Department headquarters. Instead, he helped pick the team and supervised it from Washington, D.C., where he was involved in major decisions, including the choice to seek the death penalty for McVeigh and Nichols. Garland won praise for his work on the case from the Republican governor of Oklahoma, Frank Keating.

Garland served as co-chair of the administrative law section of the District of Columbia Bar from 1991 to 1994. He is also a member of the American Law Institute.

In 2003, Garland was elected to the Harvard Board of Overseers, completing the unexpired term of Deval Patrick, who had stepped down from the board. Garland served as president of the overseers for 2009–10.

== Federal judicial service (1997–2021) ==
=== Appointment ===
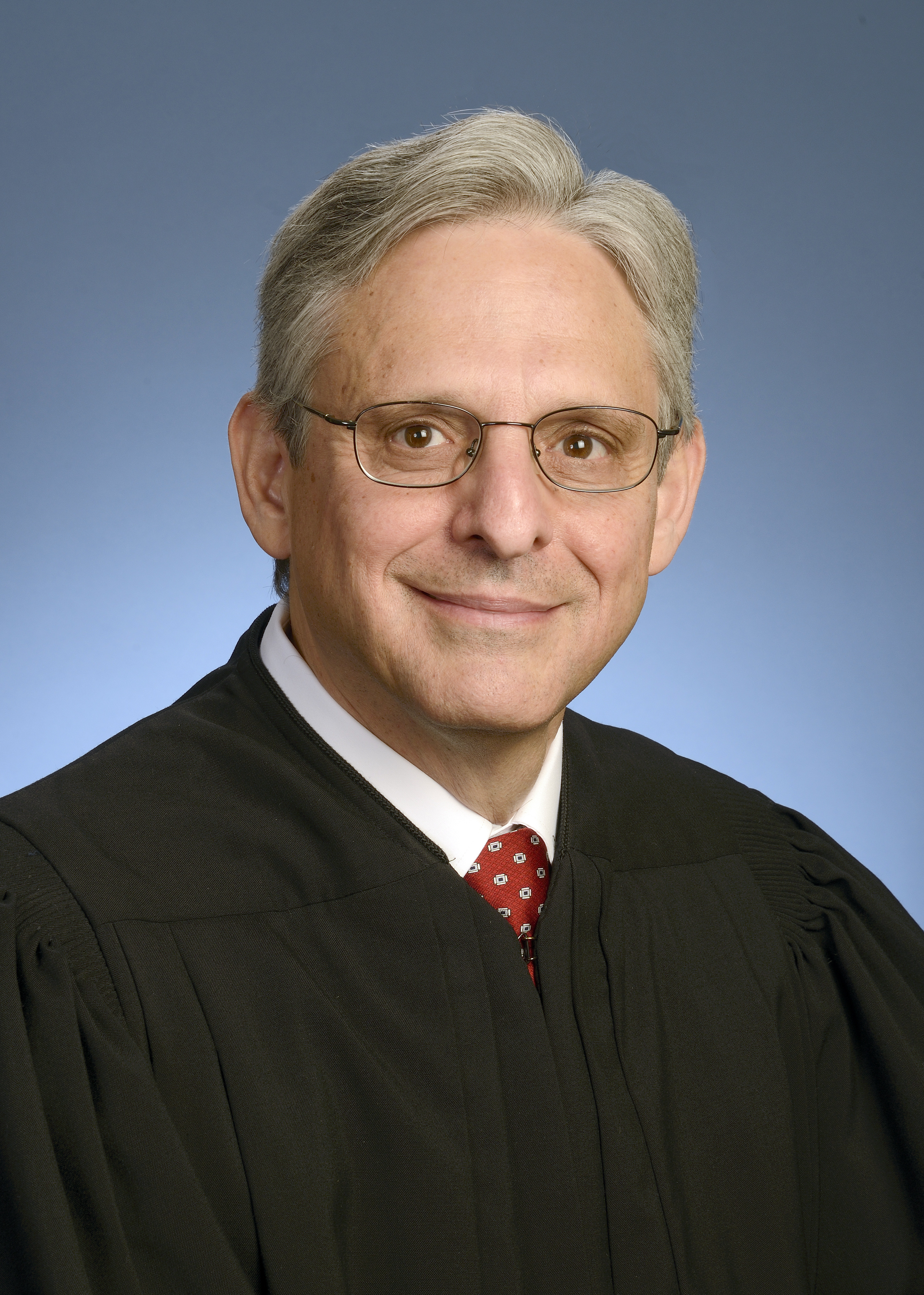
Garland in 2016 as chief judge of the U.S. Court of Appeals for the D.C. Circuit

On September 6, 1995, President Bill Clinton nominated Garland to the U.S. Court of Appeals for the District of Columbia seat vacated by his longtime mentor Abner J. Mikva. Justice Brennan, for whom Garland had clerked, recommended Garland for the position in a letter to Clinton. The American Bar Association (ABA) Standing Committee on the Federal Judiciary unanimously gave Garland a "well-qualified" committee rating, its highest.

On December 1, 1995, Garland received a hearing regarding the nomination before the Senate Judiciary Committee. In Senate confirmation hearings Garland said that the Supreme Court justices whom he most admired were Justice Brennan, for whom he clerked, and Chief Justice John Marshall. Garland also expressed admiration for the writing style of Justice Oliver Wendell Holmes Jr. However, Senate Republicans did not schedule a vote on Garland's confirmation, not because of concerns over Garland's qualifications, but because of a dispute over whether to fill the seat.

After winning the November 1996 presidential election, Clinton renominated Garland on January 7, 1997. He was confirmed on March 19, 1997, by a 76–23 vote. The majority of Republican senators voted to confirm Garland, including senators John McCain, Orrin Hatch, Susan Collins, and Jim Inhofe. Senators Mitch McConnell, Chuck Grassley, and Jeff Sessions were among those who voted against Garland. All of the 23 "no" votes came from Republicans, and all were said to be based "on whether there was even a need for an eleventh seat" on the D.C. Circuit. He received his judicial commission on March 20, 1997.

=== Service as chief judge of the D.C. Circuit ===
Garland became chief judge of the D.C. Circuit on February 12, 2013. In May 2013 he announced that the D.C. Circuit had unanimously decided to provide the public with same-day audio recordings of oral arguments in the court. During his term, he was an active member of the Judicial Conference of the United States, and was involved in the formulation of new rules to protect federal judicial branch employees from workplace harassment, which were adopted in the wake of multiple sexual misconduct allegations against Judge Alex Kozinski. Garland's seven-year term as chief judge ended on February 11, 2020, with Judge Sri Srinivasan succeeding him. Garland continued to serve as an active member of the court until his retirement.

=== Notable cases ===
Garland is considered a judicial moderate and a centrist. Garland has been described by Nina Totenberg and Carrie Johnson of NPR as "a moderate liberal, with a definite pro-prosecution bent in criminal cases". Tom Goldstein, the publisher of SCOTUSblog, wrote in 2010 that "Judge Garland's record demonstrates that he is essentially the model, neutral judge. His opinions avoid unnecessary, sweeping pronouncements." Garland has a reputation for collegiality and his opinions rarely draw a dissent. As of 2016, Garland had written just fifteen dissents in his two decades on the court, fewer than his colleague Brett Kavanaugh, who wrote some 17 dissents over the previous decade.

==== Administrative and environmental law ====
Garland has tended to favor deference to regulatory agencies. For example, in In re Aiken County (2013), Garland dissented when the court issued mandamus ordering the Nuclear Regulatory Commission to process the Yucca Mountain nuclear waste repository license. In Americans for Safe Access v. Drug Enforcement Administration (2013), Garland joined a divided court upholding the DEA's classification of marijuana as a Schedule I drug. However, according to Goldstein, in a number of split decisions on environmental law Garland "favored contested EPA regulations and actions when challenged by industry, and in other cases he has accepted challenges brought by environmental groups." In Rancho Viejo, LLC v. Norton (2003), Garland found the arroyo toad was protected by the federal Endangered Species Act. Circuit Judge John Roberts dissented from the denial of rehearing en banc, writing that Congress's interstate commerce power cannot reach "a hapless toad that, for reasons of its own, lives its entire life in California."

==== Criminal law and whistleblower protection ====
While on the bench, Garland has shown a tendency to be deferential to the government in criminal cases, siding with prosecutors in ten of the fourteen criminal cases in which he disagreed with a colleague. For example, in United States v. Watson (1999), Garland dissented when the court concluded a prosecutor's closing argument was unduly prejudicial, objecting that a conviction should be reversed for only "the most egregious of these kind of errors." In 2007, Garland dissented when the en banc D.C. Circuit reversed the conviction of a Washington, D.C. police officer who had accepted bribes in an FBI sting operation.

Garland has taken a broad view of whistleblower protection laws, such as the False Claims Act (FCA), which creates a private cause of action against those defrauding the federal government. For example, in United States ex rel. Yesudian v. Howard University (1998), Garland wrote for the court in holding that a plaintiff alleging he had been fired by Howard University for whistleblowing could sue under the FCA for retaliation. In United States ex rel. Totten v. Bombardier Corp. (2004), Garland dissented when the court, in an opinion written by Judge John Roberts, held that the FCA did not apply to false claims submitted to Amtrak because Amtrak is not the government. Roberts justified his narrow reading by citing a book by circuit judge Henry Friendly. In dissent, Garland (who like Roberts had clerked for Friendly), cited Friendly's book as supporting the use of legislative intent, writing that Roberts was relying on "'canons' of statutory construction, which serve there as 'cannons' of statutory destruction." Garland's dissent, expressing concerns that the court's ruling would impede the government's ability to pursue false claims cases against federal grantees, is credited with sparking the Fraud Enforcement and Recovery Act of 2009, which eliminated the loophole. During confirmation hearings in 2005, Senator Chuck Grassley sharply questioned Roberts on why he had not adopted Garland's reading. Roberts replied, "Any time Judge Garland disagrees, you know you're in a difficult area."

==== National security ====
During Garland's tenure, the D.C. Circuit reviewed cases arising from the Guantanamo Bay detention camp. In al Odah v. United States (2003), a panel that included Garland unanimously held that federal courts could not hear challenges from Guantanamo detainees. In July 2011, Garland wrote for the unanimous panel when it rejected Guantanamo detainee Moath Hamza Ahmed al Alawi's petition for habeas corpus. In Parhat v. Gates (2008), Garland wrote for a panel that unanimously overturned the Combatant Status Review Tribunal's determination that a captured Uyghur was an enemy combatant. In Saleh v. Titan Corp. (2009), Garland dissented from the court's holding that former Iraqi detainees at Abu Ghraib prison could not sue private military contractors who participated in torture and prisoner abuse. Garland wrote that the suit should be allowed to proceed because "no act of Congress and no judicial precedent" immunized the contractors from tort liability, the Federal Tort Claims Act specifically excludes contractors, and tort liability would not interfere with government operations.

==== First Amendment ====
According to Goldstein, Garland has "tended to take a broader view" of First Amendment rights. In cases involving the Freedom of Information Act and similar provisions related to government transparency, "Judge Garland's rulings reflect a preference for open government." In ACLU v. CIA (2013), Garland wrote for a panel unanimously rejecting the agency's Glomar response and ordering it to process the ACLU's FOIA request regarding targeted killings by CIA drones. In Cause of Action v. FTC (2015), Garland wrote for a panel unanimously overturning the agency's limitation on FOIA fee waivers to large news outlets.

In Lee v. Department of Justice (2005), Garland dissented from the denial of rehearing en banc after the D.C. Circuit affirmed the district court's order holding reporters in contempt of court for refusing to testify about their anonymous sources during the Wen Ho Lee investigation. Garland wrote that the panel had erred in failing to "weigh the public interest in protecting the reporter's sources against the private interest in compelling disclosure" and that the decision "undermined the Founders' intention to protect the press 'so that it could bare the secrets of government and inform the people.'" In Initiative & Referendum Institute v. U.S. Postal Service (2005), Garland wrote for the court, holding that a U.S. Postal Service regulation banning signature-gathering for petitions at post offices violated the First Amendment. Garland found the regulation to be facially overbroad and not narrowly tailored.

In cases involving campaign finance reform laws, Garland has applied Citizens United v. Federal Election Commission when he believed that he was compelled to do so, but he has not sought to extend its holding. In Wagner v. Federal Election Commission (2015), Garland wrote for the unanimous en banc D.C. Circuit in upholding a prohibition on campaign contributions from federal contractors because of the governmental interest in preventing corruption. In National Association of Manufacturers v. Taylor (2009), Garland wrote for the court in a decision upholding the constitutionality of lobbyist disclosure requirements under the Honest Leadership and Open Government Act. Professor Rick Hasen, an election-law expert, writes that Garland's opinions on election law are characterized by careful application of precedent and indicate that Garland believes in reasonable regulation.

Garland has addressed a number of religious freedom cases while on the D.C. Circuit, although several of these have been decided on procedural grounds. In 2002, Garland joined a unanimous court in ruling for two federal prisoners who were denied the right to consume communion wine. In 2010, Garland wrote the decision for a unanimous court in favor of an Interior Department employee who brought a religious-discrimination claim after the Interior Department refused to allow her to work weekdays rather than Sunday, when she wished to attend church and Bible study.

==== Second Amendment ====
In 2007, Garland voted in favor of en banc review of the D.C. Circuit's panel decision in Parker v. District of Columbia invalidating the D.C. handgun ban. The Supreme Court subsequently affirmed this invalidation 5–4 in an opinion by Justice Scalia.

==== Other cases ====
In Alexander v. Daley (2003), Garland joined a decision (authored by Judge Colleen Kollar-Kotelly), rejecting a challenge brought by District of Columbia residents seeking D.C. congressional voting rights.

In Hutchins v. District of Columbia (1999), Garland concurred with four other D.C. Circuit judges (en banc) that D.C.'s Juvenile Curfew Act of 1995 implicated at least some significant right of minors. He joined parts of a plurality opinion written by Judge Laurence Silberman that upheld the juvenile curfew under intermediate scrutiny and a vagueness challenge. Garland also joined the part of Judge Judith W. Rogers's opinion (concurring in part and dissenting in part) holding that a fundamental right to intrastate travel exists.

=== Retirement ===
Garland retired from federal judicial service on March 11, 2021, to accept appointment as the Attorney General of the United States.

== Supreme Court nomination ==
Garland was considered twice to fill vacated seats on the United States Supreme Court in 2009 and 2010, before finally being nominated in 2016 by President Barack Obama for the seat left vacant by the death of conservative Associate Justice Antonin Scalia.

=== 2009 and 2010 considerations ===
In 2009, following the announcement by Justice David Souter that he would retire, Garland was considered as one of nine finalists for the post, which ultimately went to Sonia Sotomayor, then a judge of the Second Circuit.

After the April 2010 announcement by Justice John Paul Stevens that he would retire, Garland was again widely seen as a leading contender for a nomination to the Supreme Court of the United States. President Obama interviewed Garland, among others, for the vacancy. In May 2010, Senator Orrin Hatch, Republican of Utah, said he would help Obama if Garland was nominated, calling Garland "a consensus nominee" and predicting that Garland would win Senate confirmation with bipartisan support. Obama nominated Solicitor General of the United States Elena Kagan, who was confirmed in August 2010.

=== Scalia vacancy and 2016 nomination ===
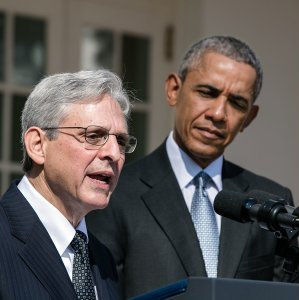
Garland with President Barack Obama in 2016

On February 13, 2016, Supreme Court Justice Antonin Scalia died. Later that day, Senate Republicans led by Majority Leader Mitch McConnell issued a statement that they would not consider any nominee put forth by Obama, and that a Supreme Court nomination should be left to the next president of the United States. President Obama responded that he intended to "fulfill my constitutional duty to appoint a judge to our highest court," and that there was no "well established tradition" that a president could not fill a Supreme Court vacancy during their last year in office.

In early March 2016, The New York Times reported that Garland was being vetted by the Obama administration as a potential nominee. A week later, Garland was named as one of three judges on the President's "short list" (along with Judge Sri Srinivasan, also of the D.C. Circuit, and Judge Paul J. Watford of the Ninth Circuit). Obama interviewed all three leading contenders, as well as two others who were being considered: Judge Jane L. Kelly of the U.S. Court of Appeals for the Eighth Circuit and Judge Ketanji Brown Jackson of the U.S. District Court for the District of Columbia. Soon afterward, Senator Orrin Hatch, President pro tempore of the United States Senate and the most senior Republican Senator, predicted that President Obama would "name someone the liberal Democratic base wants" even though he "could easily name Merrick Garland, who is a fine man." Five days later, on March 16, Obama formally nominated Garland to the vacant post of Associate Justice of the Supreme Court of the United States.

Garland had more federal judicial experience than any other Supreme Court nominee in history, and was the oldest Supreme Court nominee since Lewis F. Powell Jr. in 1971. The American Bar Association (ABA) Standing Committee on the Federal Judiciary unanimously rated Garland "well-qualified" (its highest rating) to sit on the Supreme Court.

Under Senate Majority Leader Mitch McConnell, the Senate's Republican majority refused to consider Garland's nomination, holding "no hearings, no votes, no action whatsoever" on the nomination. McConnell's categorical refusal to hold hearings on Garland's nomination was described by political scientists and legal scholars as unprecedented, McConnell's choice to lead a Republican blockade of the nomination was described as a "culmination of [his] confrontational style," and an example of constitutional hardball. Yascha Mounk called it a "blatant abuse of constitutional norms."

After a period of 293 days, Garland's nomination expired on January 3, 2017, at the end of the 114th Congress, the 15th nomination to the Supreme Court to lapse at the end of a session of Congress. It was the longest pending period of a Supreme Court nominee in history, far exceeding the 125-day delay faced by the ultimately confirmed Justice Louis Brandeis in 1916. On January 31, 2017, President Donald Trump nominated Neil Gorsuch to fill the Court vacancy. On April 7, 2017, the Senate confirmed Gorsuch's nomination to the Supreme Court.

McConnell went on to boast about stopping Garland's nomination, saying in August 2016, "one of my proudest moments was when I looked Barack Obama in the eye and I said, 'Mr. President, you will not fill the Supreme Court vacancy.'" In April 2018, McConnell said the decision not to act upon the Garland nomination was "the most consequential decision I've made in my entire public career".

== United States attorney general (2021–2025) ==
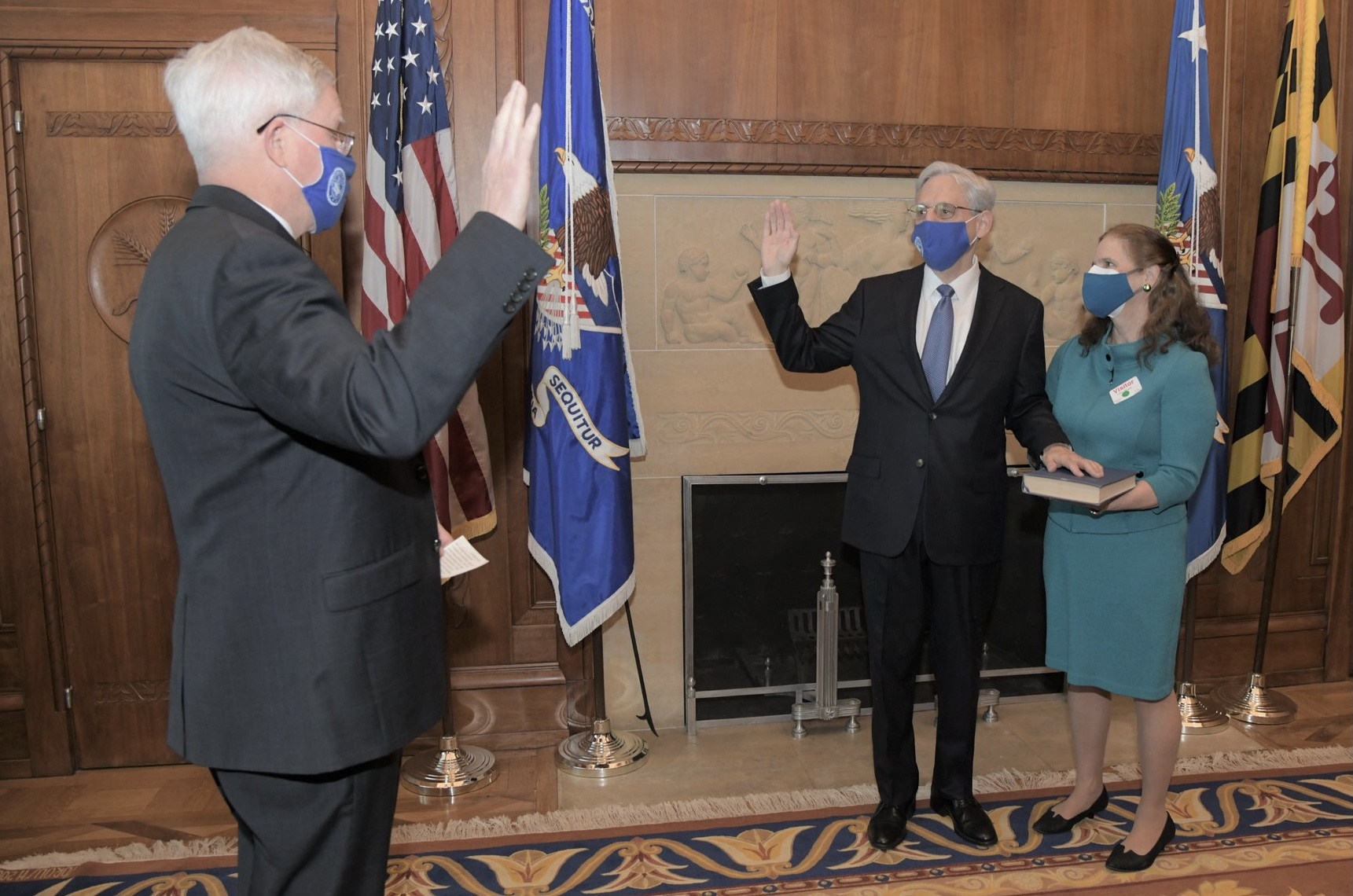
Garland is sworn in as Attorney General in March 2021.

=== Nomination and confirmation ===
President-elect Joe Biden selected Garland for the position of United States attorney general, with news of the selection coming on January 6, 2021. He was formally nominated by Biden on January 20, after Biden took office. In Senate Judiciary Committee confirmation hearings, Garland vowed to oversee vigorous prosecution of those who stormed the United States Capitol, and other domestic extremists, drawing on his experience prosecuting the perpetrators of the Oklahoma City bombing. Garland said it was likely the Biden administration would place a moratorium on use of the federal death penalty and expressed reservations about the death penalty in light of the "almost randomness or arbitrariness of its application." He pledged to protect equal justice under law and reinvigorate the DOJ Civil Rights Division, which, according to some media figures, languished under the Trump administration. Garland affirmed that the Justice Department would remain independent under his leadership. The Senate Judiciary Committee voted 15–7 to advance Garland's nomination to the Senate floor, and on March 10, the Senate confirmed Garland's nomination by a 70–30 vote. He was sworn in on March 11, 2021, by Assistant Attorney General for Administration Lee J. Lofthus.

=== Tenure ===
In April 2021, Russia imposed sanctions against Garland, including prohibiting him from entering Russia. This was in retaliation for U.S. expulsion of 10 Russian diplomats, a sanction imposed by the United States against Russia for its SolarWinds hack, aggression against Ukraine, and interference in the 2020 U.S. election.

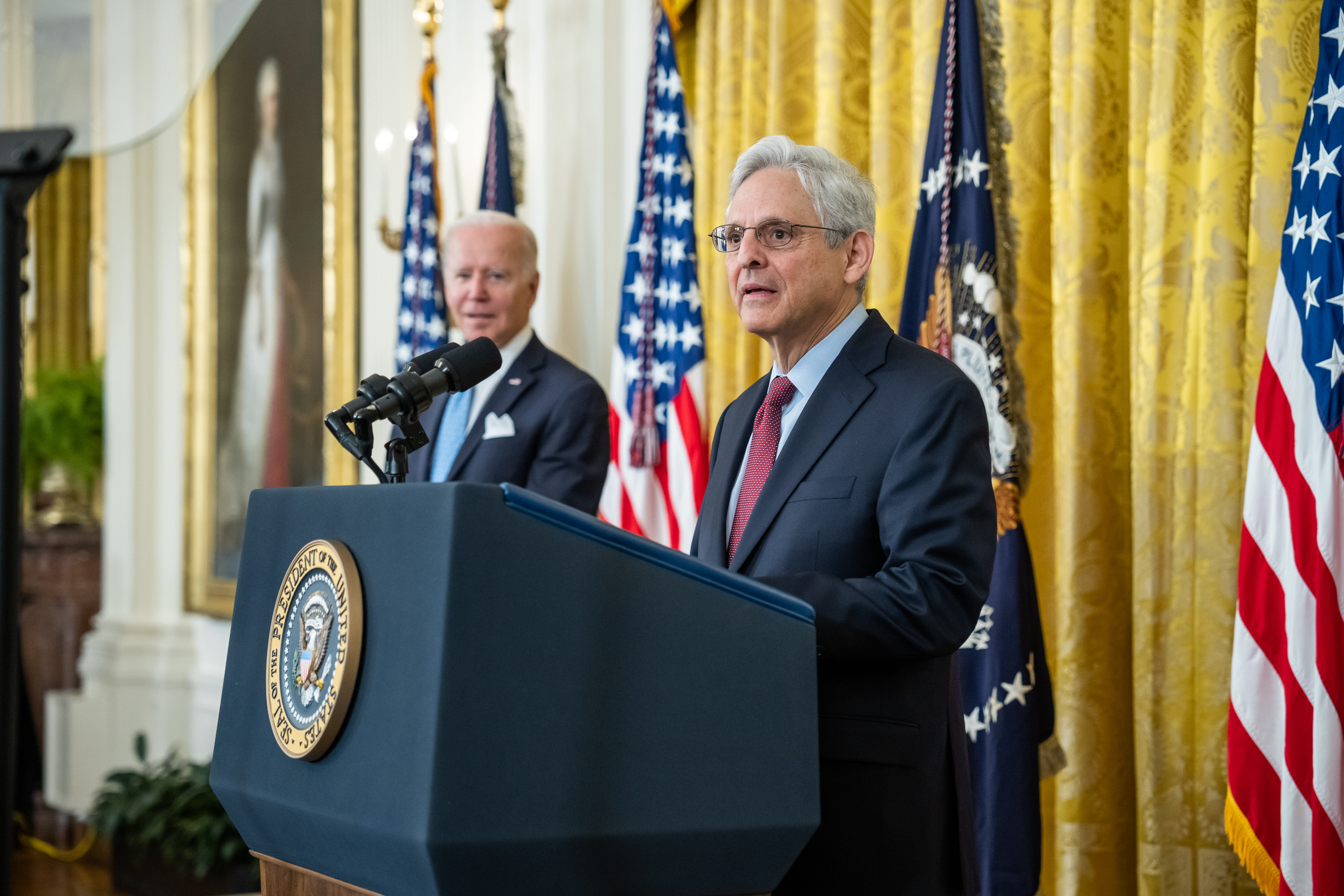
Merrick Garland delivering remarks in the East Room of the White House, May 16, 2022.

In May 2021, the DOJ appealed in part a ruling by Judge Amy Berman Jackson of the District Court for the District of Columbia to make public most of a DOJ memo detailing former attorney general Bill Barr's legal rationale for clearing President Trump of obstruction of justice in the Special Counsel investigation.

On June 7, 2021, the Justice Department continued its defense of a defamation lawsuit by E. Jean Carroll, arguing that Trump could not be sued because he had denied her rape allegation in offending statements in his presidential capacity. Garland had been deeply involved in the decision. The White House quickly distanced itself from the decision. Garland in a House Judiciary Committee hearing on October 21 stated that the DOJ's briefing was solely on the question of the application of the Federal Tort Claims Act.

On July 1, 2021, Garland imposed a moratorium on all federal executions pending a review of relevant policies and procedures. The review will examine "the risk of pain and suffering associated with the use of pentobarbital," "regulations made in November 2020 that expanded the permissible methods of execution beyond lethal injection, and authorized the use of state facilities and personnel in federal executions", and "December 2020 and January 2021 changes to expedite execution of capital sentences." This was consistent with Biden's pledge to push for legislation to end the federal death penalty. In spite of this, Garland has continued to pursue the death penalty in cases in which a previous administration had sought the death penalty against a suspected terrorist. The Trump administration resumed federal executions in 2019, and executed 13 inmates in total, the first in 17 years and including the first woman in 70 years.

=== Voting rights ===
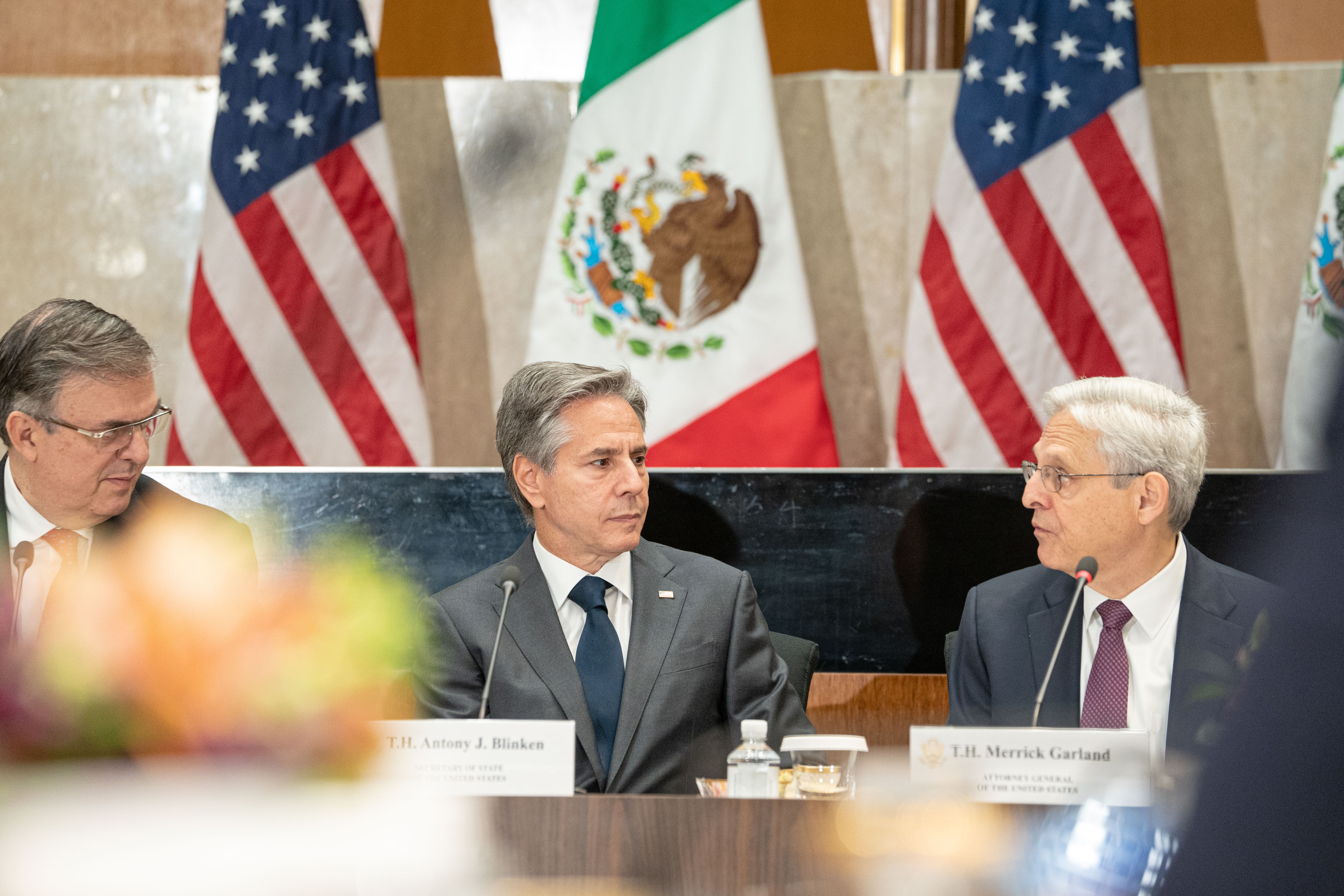
Garland with Secretary of State Antony Blinken during the U.S.-Mexico High-Level Security Dialogue in Washington, D.C., October 13, 2022.

In June 2021, Garland pledged to double the department's enforcement staff for protecting the right to vote, in response to Republican Party efforts to restrict voting following the 2020 presidential election, The same month, Garland announced a DOJ lawsuit against the state of Georgia over its newly passed restrictions on voting; the DOJ complaint said that the state targeted Black Americans in violation of the Voting Rights Act of 1965.

In July 2021, the Justice Department released two guidance documents regarding election law changes and post-election audits, reminding states that the DOJ was closely observing states' compliance with federal election and civil rights laws.

In November 2021, the DOJ sued Texas over Senate Bill 1 which required rejection of mail ballots "for immaterial errors and omissions," alleging it would restrict voting for those with limited English proficiency, soldiers deployed and voters overseas.

In a separate suit filed by DOJ against Texas the following month, the federal government alleged that Texas' redistricting plans discriminated against Latino and Black voters in violation of the Section 2 of the Voting Rights Act.

=== Civil rights ===
During Garland's tenure as attorney general, the Justice Department emphasized protection of civil rights. Garland rescinded a Trump administration policy (imposed by Jeff Sessions) that curtailed DOJ investigations into police department misconduct ("pattern-and-practice" investigations) and restricted the use of consent decrees to reform police departments.

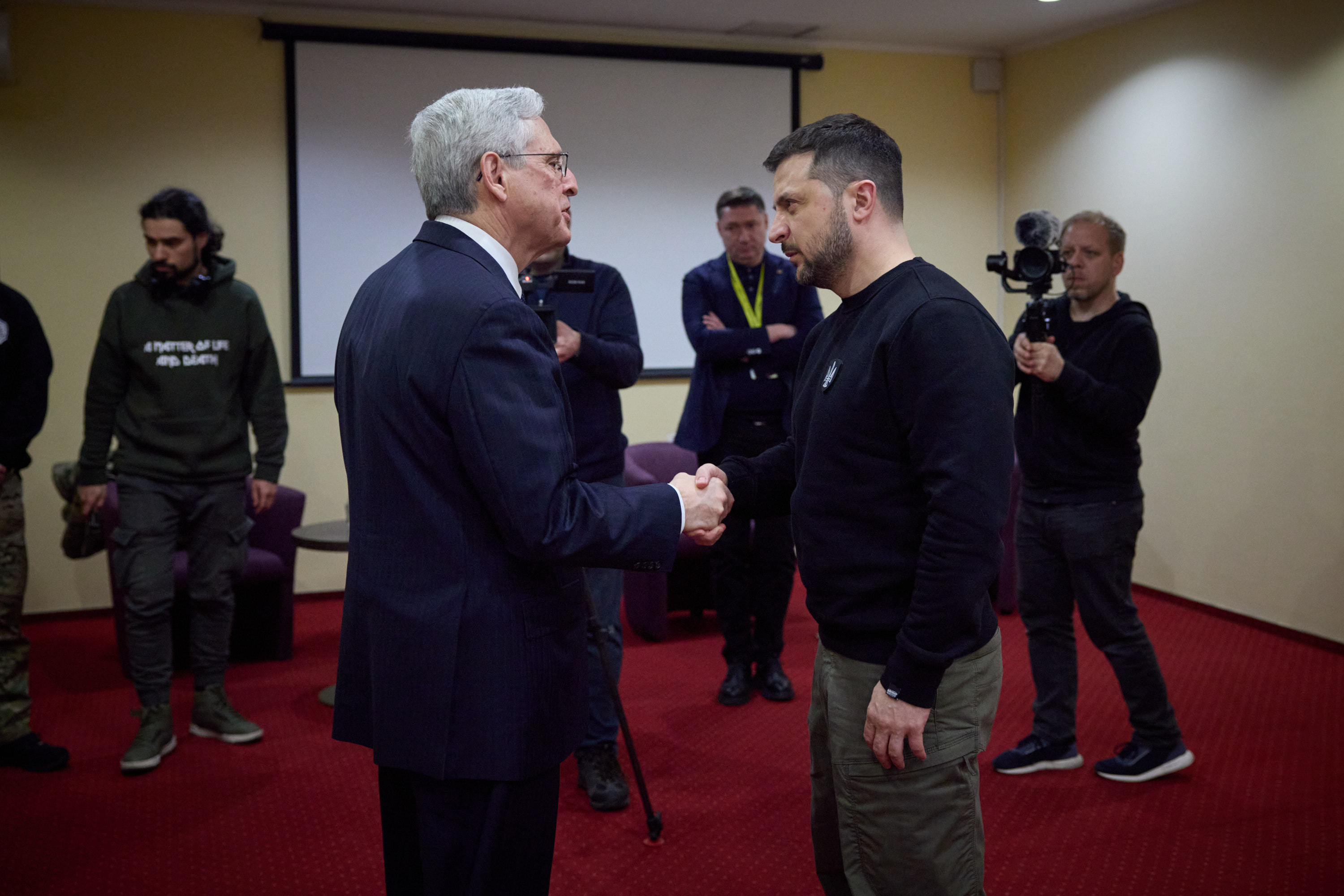
Garland meeting with Ukrainian President Volodymyr Zelenskyy, March 3, 2023

On April 21, 2021, Garland subsequently announced that the DOJ was opening a pattern-and-practice investigation into the Minneapolis Police Department after former officer Derek Chauvin was convicted for the murder of George Floyd, examining the use of force by officers and discriminatory conduct, its treatment of people with behavioral health issues, and the department's current accountability systems. On April 26, Garland announced another investigation into the Louisville Metro Police Department in the aftermath of the killing of Breonna Taylor, examining the execution of search warrants. On August 5, Garland opened another investigation into the Phoenix Police Department over its policies on dealing with the homeless. On December 3, the DOJ opened another investigation into the Mount Vernon Police Department to assess if it engaged in discriminatory policing, involving its use of force, strip and body cavity searches, how it handles evidence, and its systems of accountability.

In June 2021, the DOJ, through a memo issued by Deputy Attorney General Lisa Monaco, reversed a Trump-era policy that banned federal officers and agents from using body-worn cameras; the memo also mandated the use of body-worn cameras for federal law enforcement in certain circumstances (including when carrying out planned arrests or executing search warrants).

On September 14, 2021, the DOJ announced a civil investigation into prisons in Georgia, focusing on prison violence and sexual abuse of LGBTQ prisoners by prisoners and staff, continuing with an initial investigation launched in 2016.

In September, 2021, the DOJ in a memo limited the use of chokeholds and carotid restraints by federal officers during arrests, prohibiting such tactics unless deadly force is authorized (i.e., unless the officer reasonably believes "that the subject of such force poses an imminent danger of death or serious physical injury to the officer or to another person"). The memo also limited the use of unannounced ("no-knock") entries when executing warrants, directing officers to knock-and-announce except "where an agent has reasonable grounds to believe that knocking and announcing the agent's presence would create an imminent threat of physical violence to the agent and/or another person."

On October 13, 2021, the DOJ launched another investigation into five juvenile detention facilities in Texas for systemic physical or sexual abuse of children.

=== January 6 U.S. Capitol attack ===
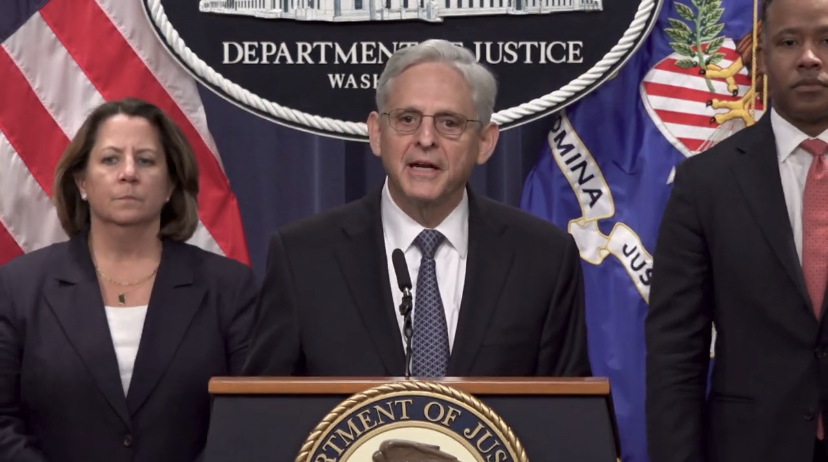
Garland announcing the appointment of Special Counsel Jack Smith to oversee the Trump investigations, 18 November 2022.

On July 26, 2021, the DOJ sent letters to former DOJ officials of the Trump administration, including acting attorney general Jeffrey A. Rosen, acting deputy attorney general Richard Donoghue, Associate Deputy Attorney General Patrick Hovakimian, U.S. attorney for the Northern District of Georgia Byung J. "BJay" Pak, acting U.S. attorney for the Northern District of Georgia Bobby L. Christine, and United States assistant attorney general for the Environment and Natural Resources Division and Civil Division Jeffrey Clark. The letters relayed that the DOJ would not exert executive privilege over their testimony as witnesses to Trump's attempts to overturn the 2020 United States presidential election or the 2021 United States Capitol attack, and that they were free to provide "unrestricted testimony" and "irrespective of potential privilege" to the House Oversight Committee and Senate Judiciary Committee.

On July 28, 2021, the DOJ further rejected Rep. Mo Brooks's request to protect him in Eric Swalwell's civil lawsuit against him and Trump concerning his comments and actions in the attack. The DOJ in a court filing determined that Brooks' relevant comments and actions were outside the scope of his official responsibilities as a member of Congress.

On October 21, 2021, the U.S. House of Representatives voted to refer Steve Bannon, the adviser to former president Donald Trump, to the DOJ for criminal contempt of Congress due to defying a subpoena from the House's January 6 select committee over claims of executive privilege. After Speaker Nancy Pelosi certified the contempt referral, it was sent to the U.S. Attorney for DC, who will then decide whether to send the referral to a grand jury for indictment, with Garland having the final say. Garland told lawmakers that the Justice Department "will apply the facts and the law and make a decision" when considering a criminal contempt referral for Bannon. He stated that "the Department of Justice will do what it always does in such circumstances, we'll apply the facts and the law and make a decision, consistent with the principles of prosecution."

In November 2022, days after Trump announced his 2024 presidential campaign, Garland appointed Jack Smith to serve as special counsel for the investigations of Trump.

=== Robert Hur report ===
On February 8, 2024, the Department of Justice released a report authored by special counsel Robert Hur into President Biden's handling of classified documents, concluding that charges were not necessary in the incident. As part of its reasoning not to charge Biden, the report mentioned perceived problems with Biden's memory and mental acuity. Biden was interviewed by Hur during the investigation, helping form the report's conclusions.

Garland has been criticized by supporters of Biden and some former prosecutors for his decision to release Hur's report referring to Biden as an "elderly man with a poor memory." They alleged that Hur's report included gratuitous language about Biden that could be used to reinforce perceptions that Biden is fading mentally and physically.

Associate deputy attorney general Bradley Weinsheimer, the DOJ's senior nonpolitical career official, rejected criticisms of the report, stating that the report's comments "fall well within the department's standards for public release". Garland stated that Hur had never proposed an investigative step which he found to be inappropriate.

=== School board memo ===
In October 2021, amid a surge of threats against school board members across the country, Garland issued a memorandum addressing an "increase in harassment, intimidation, and threats of violence against school administrators, board members, teachers, and staff"; the memo directed the FBI and US attorneys' offices to set up meetings with federal, state and local law enforcement leaders for establishing tiplines for threat reporting and discussing strategies to address such threats. He issued the memo soon after the National School Boards Association wrote to Biden to request a federal response to the protests and threats against school officials and investigations into whether they constituted as forms of domestic terrorism and hate crimes.

The memo prompted criticism from Republicans in the House and Senate, who accused Garland of treating parents like domestic terrorists, although the memo did not mention either of them. McConnell wrote to Garland that parents "absolutely should be telling" local schools what to teach regarding contentious public issues. In House and Senate Judiciary Committee hearings, Garland pushed back on Republicans' claims that the DOJ was treating parents like "domestic terrorists" and investigating political speech, testifying that the DOJ was "not investigating peaceful protest or parent involvement at school board meetings." Numerous Senate Republicans called on Garland to resign over the memo. Seventeen Republican state attorneys general led by Todd Rokita, and numerous House Republicans, separately wrote to Biden and Garland requesting the memorandum be immediately withdrawn.

=== Contempt of Congress charges ===
The House Judiciary Committee and the House Oversight Committee issued subpoenas for Garland to turn over materials related to Hur's investigation, particularly audio of Hur's interview with Biden. Biden subsequently invoked executive privilege to block the release of the materials, preventing Garland from turning them over. Department of Justice officials also argued that the audio of Biden's interview could be fraudulently edited or deepfaked and that the disclosure could hamper cooperation in future investigations. On June 12, 2024, Garland was held in contempt by the House of Representatives for defying the subpoenas and refusing to disclose audio of Hur's interview with Biden. The Department of Justice stated that Garland cannot be prosecuted for contempt due to Biden's invocation of executive privilege.

House speaker Mike Johnson said he will move in federal court to enforce a subpoena against Garland to obtain audio recordings of Biden, after the Justice Department declined to act on the House's contempt referral.

Three lawsuits have been filed by organizations seeking access to the audio recordings of the Biden interview. Judicial Watch, the Heritage Foundation and CNN are the plaintiffs in these lawsuits, which are based on the failure of the Department of Justice to provide the audio in response to Freedom of Information Act requests. CNN's lawsuit has been joined by eleven other news organizations. The three lawsuits have been consolidated and are pending before Judge Timothy Kelly.

On July 11, 2024, an attempt by the House of Representatives to find United States attorney general Garland in "inherent contempt" of Congress fell short in a 204 to 210 vote, with four Republicans voting with all Democrats to oppose the measure. The resolution would have imposed a fine of $10,000 per day on Garland for defying a congressional subpoena until he handed over audio of former special counsel Robert Hur's interview with President Joe Biden.

=== Arctic Frost investigation ===
In April 2022, Garland approved the opening of "Arctic Frost," a sensitive investigative matter examining alleged efforts to submit false electoral certificates following the 2020 presidential election. Garland appointed Jack Smith as Special Counsel in November 2022 to oversee the investigation.

=== Pace of Trump prosecution ===
Garland has been criticized for the pace of the prosecution of then-former president Donald Trump. Some observers, reportedly including President Joe Biden, assign him some responsibility for the fact that none of the indictments obtained by special counsel Jack Smith went to trial before the November 2024 election. California's then-representative Adam Schiff was quoted as saying, "I think that delay has contributed to a situation where none of these trials may go forward. The department bears some of that responsibility."

Some commentators have defended Garland, pointing to substantial delays in the prosecution stemming from John Roberts and the Supreme Court's immunity decision in Trump v. United States.

After Trump's re-election for a second non-consecutive term, further criticism was directed against Garland.

== Personal life ==
Garland and his wife, Lynn, were married at the Harvard Club in Midtown Manhattan in September 1987. Lynn Rosenman Garland's grandfather, Samuel Irving Rosenman, was a justice of the New York Supreme Court (a trial-level court) and a special counsel to presidents Franklin D. Roosevelt and Harry S. Truman. She graduated from the Brearley School in Manhattan and cum laude from Harvard University, and received a Master of Science degree in operations management from the MIT Sloan School of Management. Her father, Robert Rosenman, was a partner in the New York law firm of Cravath, Swaine & Moore. As of June 2018, she advised government and nonprofit groups on voting systems security and accuracy issues. The couple lives together in Bethesda, Maryland.

Garland and his wife have two daughters: Rebecca and Jessica, both of whom are graduates of Yale University. Justice Elena Kagan hired Jessica Garland, a 2019 graduate of Yale Law School, as one of her law clerks in early July 2020, before Biden's election and Garland's appointment, to serve as a law clerk in 2022–2023. The Supreme Court said that "in light of the potential for actual or apparent conflicts of interest," Jessica Garland will not serve as Kagan's law clerk while her father remains as attorney general. Garland took part in the ceremony when his daughter Rebecca married Xan Tanner in June 2018.

Financial disclosure forms in 2016 indicated that Garland's net worth at the time was between $6 million and $23M. As of 2021, his net worth was estimated by Forbes at $8.6-33M.

Garland is red-green colorblind, so he uses a list to match his suits and ties. He is a Reform Jew.

In May 2025, Garland returned to Arnold & Porter after leaving government service.

== Selected publications ==
- Garland, Merrick B. (1976). "Note: The State Action Exemption and Antitrust Enforcement under the Federal Trade Commission Act". Harvard Law Review. 89 (4): 715–751. doi:10.2307/1340219. JSTOR 1340219.
- —; Pitofsky, Robert (1984). "Chapter 48: Federal Trade Commission Investigations". In von Kalinowski, Julian O. (ed.). Antitrust Counseling and Litigation Techniques. Vol. 4. New York: Bender. OCLC 917754819.
- — (1985). "Deregulation and Judicial Review" (PDF). Harvard Law Review. 98 (3): 505–591. doi:10.2307/1340869. JSTOR 1340869.
- — (1987). "Antitrust and State Action: Economic Efficiency and the Political Process". The Yale Law Journal. 96 (3): 486–519. doi:10.2307/796502. JSTOR 796502.
- — (1987). "Antitrust and Federalism: A Response to Professor Wiley". The Yale Law Journal. 96 (6): 1291–1295. doi:10.2307/796386. JSTOR 796386.

== See also ==
- Barack Obama Supreme Court candidates
- Barack Obama judicial appointment controversies
- List of law clerks for the third seat of the Supreme Court of the United States
- List of nominations to the Supreme Court of the United States
- List of Jewish American jurists
- List of Jewish United States Cabinet members

Legal offices
Preceded by Abner Mikva	Judge of the United States Court of Appeals for the District of Columbia Circuit; 1997–2021	Succeeded by Ketanji Brown Jackson
Preceded by David B. Sentelle	Chief Judge of the United States Court of Appeals for the District of Columbia Circuit; 2013–2020	Succeeded by Sri Srinivasan
Preceded by William Barr	United States Attorney General; 2021–2025	Succeeded by Pam Bondi
U.S. order of precedence (ceremonial)
Preceded by Marcia Fudge as Former U.S. Cabinet Member	Order of precedence of the United States as Former U.S. Cabinet Member	Succeeded by Deb Haaland as Former U.S. Cabinet Member
