= Michael H. v. Gerald D. =

- Supreme Court of the United States

Argued October 11, 1988 Decided June 15, 1989
- Full case name: Michael H. and Victoria D. v. Gerald D.
- Citations: 491 U.S. 110 (more)

Case history
- Prior: Summary judgment for defendant aff'd, 191 Cal. App. 3d 995 (Cal. Ct. App. 1987); probable jurisdiction noted, 485 U.S. 903 (1988)

Holding
- California's conclusive-presumption law does not violate the Due Process Clause.

Court membership
- Chief Justice William Rehnquist Associate Justices William J. Brennan Jr. · Byron White; Thurgood Marshall · Harry Blackmun; John P. Stevens · Sandra Day O'Connor; Antonin Scalia · Anthony Kennedy

Case opinions
- Plurality: Scalia, joined by Rehnquist; O'Connor and Kennedy (in part)
- Concurrence: O'Connor (in part), joined by Kennedy
- Concurrence: Stevens (in judgment)
- Dissent: Brennan, joined by Marshall, Blackmun
- Dissent: White, joined by Brennan

Laws applied
- U.S. Const. amend. XIV

Michael H. v. Gerald D., 491 U.S. 110 (1989), was a case decided by the Supreme Court of the United States involving substantive due process in the context of paternity law. Splitting five to four, the Court rejected a challenge to a California law that presumed that a married woman's child was a product of that marriage. The Court held that the due-process rights of a man who claimed to be a child's biological father had not been violated.

== Background ==
The biological fathers of illegitimate children traditionally received no legal rights, and states passed laws that denied them custody on the grounds that they were likely irresponsible and uninterested in their children. In Stanley v. Illinois (1972), the Supreme Court of the United States had previously addressed the constitutionality of such laws. Peter and Joan Stanley lived together as an unmarried couple for eighteen years; after Joan's death, Peter was denied custody of two of his children on the grounds that he was not their parent under state law. The Supreme Court ruled in his favor, holding that since unmarried fathers have a "liberty interest" in their relationships with children whom they had "sired and raised", states could not remove the children without providing the father a chance to demonstrate his fitness. The Court subsequently addressed questions involving the constitutionality of legitimacy laws in Quilloin v. Walcott (1978), Caban v. Mohammed (1979), and Lehr v. Robertson (1983).

According to The Washington Post's Ruth Marcus, the facts of the dispute "more closely resembled a soap opera synopsis than a typical Supreme Court case". Carole D. (Note: Although the full last names of the parties were reported in the press, they were not mentioned in the judicial proceedings for privacy reasons.) was a model; in 1976, she wed Gerald D., who worked as an executive in a French oil corporation. The couple resided in Playa del Rey, California. Beginning in 1978, Carole had an affair with Michael H., who was her next-door neighbor. In 1981, she gave birth to a child, Victoria D.; the birth certificate listed Gerald as the father, but Carole told Michael that she thought that the child was his. Blood tests taken later that year indicated with 98.07% certainty that Michael was Victoria's father. Throughout 1982, Victoria and Carole resided in multiple homes, living with Michael, Gerald, or someone else.

Carole eventually refused to let Michael visit Victoria, and he filed suit in California superior court in November 1982 seeking visitation and a recognition that he was the biological father. Michael and Carole signed a stipulation that said that Michael was the father, but Carole subsequently ended her relationship with Michael and again moved in with Gerald; she directed her lawyers not to file the stipulation with the court. Having intervened in the case, Gerald moved for summary judgment, invoking section 621 of the California Evidence Code. That statute, which dated back to 1872, created a presumption that a married woman's child was the product of the marital relationship, a presumption that could be rebutted only by the husband or wife and only under narrow circumstances.

The superior court granted Gerald's motion, rejected challenges by Victoria (represented by a guardian ad litem) and Michael to the law's constitutionality, and denied visitation on the grounds that it would "violat[e] the intention of the Legislature by impugning the integrity of the family unit". The California Court of Appeal, Second District, affirmed, holding that the law did not violate Michael's rights under the Fourteenth Amendment's Due Process Clause. The Court of Appeal denied rehearing, and the Supreme Court of California declined to hear the case. Michael and Victoria appealed to the U.S. Supreme Court, which heard arguments on October 11, 1988. Michael contended that he had a liberty interest in his relationship with Victoria and that the Due Process Clause required that he have an opportunity to be heard before he could be deprived of that liberty interest.

== Decision ==
The Court handed down its decision on June 15, 1989. Dividing five to four, the justices affirmed the Court of Appeal's decision. Justice Antonin Scalia wrote for a plurality; his opinion was joined by Chief Justice William Rehnquist and, with the exception of a footnote, by Justices Sandra Day O'Connor and Anthony Kennedy. O'Connor filed a concurrence, which was joined by Kennedy. Justice John Paul Stevens wrote an opinion concurring in the judgment. Justice William J. Brennan Jr. (joined by Justices Thurgood Marshall and Harry Blackmun) and Justice Byron White (joined by Brennan) filed separate dissents.

=== Plurality opinion ===
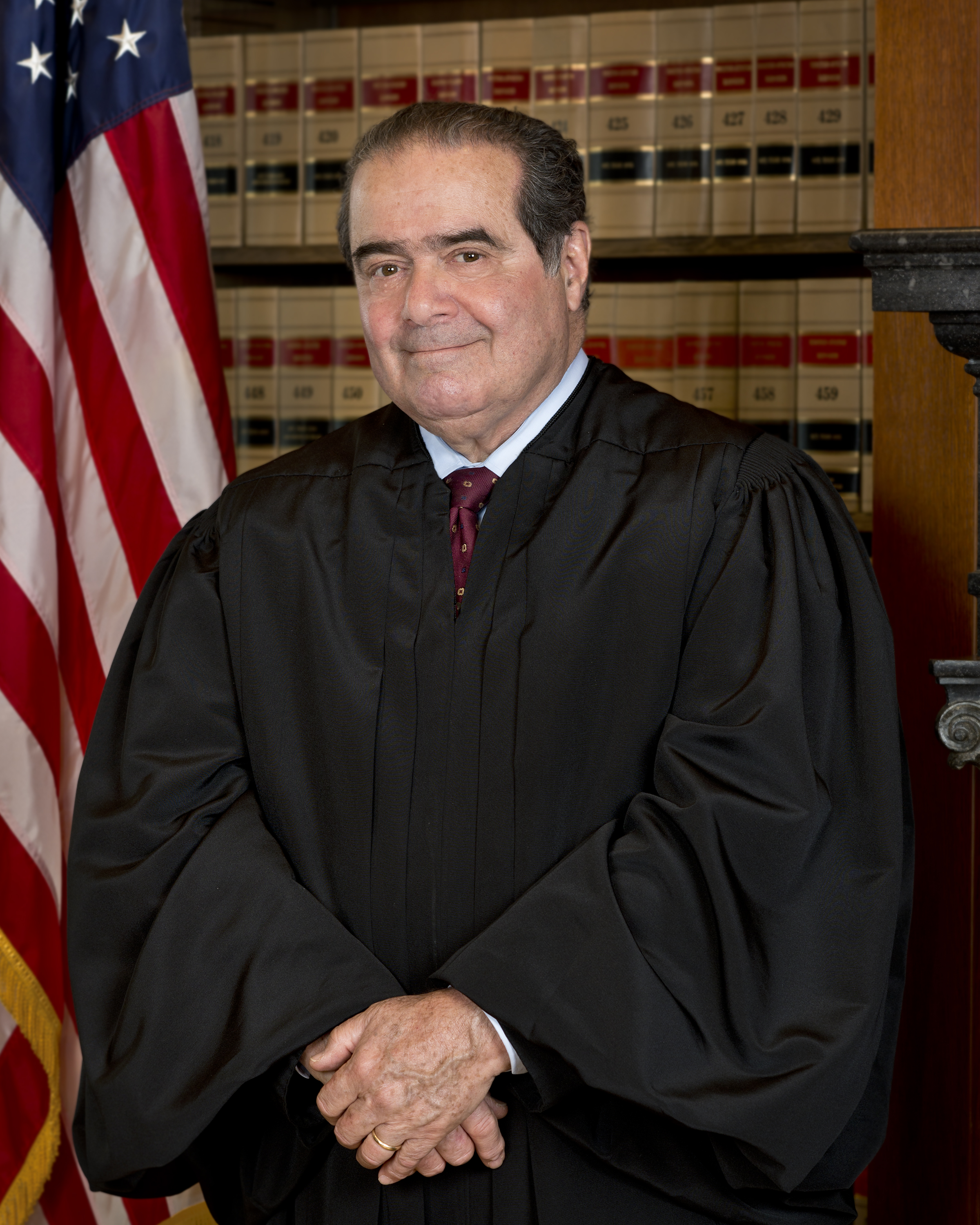
Justice Antonin Scalia authored the plurality opinion.

For the plurality, Scalia rejected Michael's argument that he had a procedural-due-process right to be heard regarding his paternity claim, reasoning that the challenged California law was substantive rather than procedural. Treating Michael's arguments as an invocation of substantive due process, the plurality then concluded that he had no constitutionally protected liberty interest in his relationship with Victoria. Scalia reasoned that since courts ought to be hesitant to embrace substantive-due-process arguments, only liberty interests that have been "traditionally protected by our society" are constitutionally protected. His sixth footnote asserted that the judiciary should assess claims of constitutionally protected liberty interests by looking to "the most specific level at which a relevant tradition protecting, or denying protection to, the asserted right can be identified". He therefore reasoned that the case involved the "rights of an adulterous natural father" and that such rights had not traditionally been protected by American society.

=== O'Connor's concurrence ===
O'Connor, joined by Kennedy, filed a short concurrence in which she declined to join Scalia's sixth footnote on the grounds that it "may be somewhat inconsistent with our past decisions in this area". She wrote that she did not wish to "foreclose the unanticipated by the prior imposition of a single mode of historical analysis".

=== Stevens's concurrence ===
Stevens concluded that although Michael was not entitled to a hearing on his paternity claim as such, he was entitled to a hearing regarding visitation and other related parental rights. Another California law permitted non-parents to seek visitation if visitation was in the child's best interests. Since this provision provided process to Michael, Stevens reasoned that any liberty interest he had was sufficiently protected.

=== Brennan's dissent ===
Brennan filed what Anna Quindlen described as a "withering dissent". He wrote:

The document that the plurality construes today is unfamiliar to me. It is not the living charter that I have taken to be our Constitution; it is instead a stagnant, archaic, hidebound document steeped in the prejudices and superstitions of a time long past. This Constitution does not recognize that times change, does not see that sometimes a practice or rule outlives its foundations. I cannot accept an interpretive method that does such violence to the charter that I am bound by oath to uphold.

Brennan argued that under prior precedent, a protected liberty interest was present because Michael and Victoria were biologically connected and had an established relationship. He rejected the plurality's emphasis on the "unitary family" and its willingness to dismiss the procedural-due-process claim. He also disagreed with Stevens's interpretation of California law, arguing that it constituted merely "wishful thinking" since California courts did not afford visitation to putative fathers whose claims had been rejected under section 621.

=== White's dissent ===
White rejected the plurality's conclusion that the issue of biological fatherhood was not relevant since Victoria had been born into a legal marriage. He concluded that Michael had the same sort of liberty interest as had been recognized in prior cases and that California had deprived him of it without due process of law.
