= Baby Jessica =

Baby Jessica may refer to the subject of the:

- Baby Jessica case, a 1993 custody battle in Ann Arbor, Michigan, US
- Rescue of Jessica McClure, a 1987 rescue of a baby who fell down a well in Midland, Texas, US
