= List of United States Supreme Court cases, volume 434 =

This is a list of all the United States Supreme Court cases from volume 434 of the United States Reports:

Case name	Citation	Date decided
New Hampshire v. Maine	434 U.S. 1	1977
Arlington County Board v. Richards	434 U.S. 5	1977
Dump Truck Owners Ass'n v. Pub. Util. Comm'n	434 U.S. 9	1977
Gen. Atomic Co. v. Felter	434 U.S. 12	1977
Rinaldi v. United States	434 U.S. 22	1977
Citizens & S. Nat'l Bank v. Bougas	434 U.S. 35	1977
Califano v. Jobst	434 U.S. 47	1977
Key v. Doyle	434 U.S. 59	1977
Comm'r v. Kowalski	434 U.S. 77	1977
Shell Oil Co. v. Dartt	434 U.S. 99	1977
Idaho Dept. of Emp. v. Smith	434 U.S. 100	1977
Pennsylvania v. Mimms	434 U.S. 106	1977
New York v. Cathedral Academy	434 U.S. 125	1977
Nashville Gas Co. v. Satty	434 U.S. 136	1977
Richmond Unified Sch. Dist. v. Berg	434 U.S. 158	1977
United States v. N.Y. Tel. Co.	434 U.S. 159	1977
United Air Lines, Inc. v. McMann	434 U.S. 192	1977
Moore v. Illinois (1977)	434 U.S. 220	1977
Chase Manhattan Bank (N. A.) v. South Acres Development Co.	434 U.S. 236	1978
Phila. Newspapers, Inc. v. Jerome	434 U.S. 241	1978
Quilloin v. Walcott	434 U.S. 246	1978
Browder v. Dept. of Corr.	434 U.S. 257	1978
Federal courts of appeals lack jurisdiction to hear untimely filed appeals.
Adamo Wrecking Co. v. United States	434 U.S. 275	1978
Pfizer, Inc. v. Government of India	434 U.S. 308	1978
Smith v. Digmon	434 U.S. 332	1978
NLRB v. Iron Workers	434 U.S. 335	1978
Carter v. Miller	434 U.S. 356	1978
Bordenkircher v. Hayes	434 U.S. 357	1978
Zablocki v. Redhail	434 U.S. 374	1978
Christiansburg Garment Co. v. Equal Employment Opportunity Commission	434 U.S. 412	1978
Vendo Co. v. Lektro-Vend Corp.	434 U.S. 425	1978
Raymond Motor Transp., Inc. v. Rice	434 U.S. 429	1978
U.S. Steel Corp. v. Multistate Tax Comm'n	434 U.S. 452	1978
Arizona v. Washington	434 U.S. 497	1978
Fulman v. United States	434 U.S. 528	1978
Durst v. United States	434 U.S. 542	1978
Procunier v. Navarette	434 U.S. 555	1978
Lorillard v. Pons	434 U.S. 575	1978
J.W. Bateson Co. v. United States ex rel. Nat'l Automatic Sprinkler Indus. Pension Fund	434 U.S. 586	1978
Thompson v. Washington	434 U.S. 898	1977
Califano v. McRae	434 U.S. 1301	1977
Divans v. California	434 U.S. 1303	1977
Seventh-Day Adventists v. Marshall	434 U.S. 1305	1977
Beame v. Friends of the Earth	434 U.S. 1310	1977
Commodity Futures Trading Comm'n v. British Am. Commodity Options Corp.	434 U.S. 1316	1977
Richmond v. Arizona	434 U.S. 1323	1977
Nat'l Socialist Party v. Skokie	434 U.S. 1327	1977
Wise v. Lipscomb	434 U.S. 1329	1977
Krause v. Rhodes	434 U.S. 1335	1977
Barthuli v. Jefferson Elementary Sch. Dist.	434 U.S. 1337	1977
Mecom v. United States	434 U.S. 1340	1977
Mincey v. Arizona	434 U.S. 1343	1977
New Motor Vehicle Bd. v. Orrin W. Fox Co.	434 U.S. 1345	1977
NBC v. Niemi	434 U.S. 1354	1978
