= List of United States Supreme Court cases, volume 463 =

This is a list of all the United States Supreme Court cases from volume 463 of the United States Reports:

Case name	Citation	Date decided
Franchise Tax Bd. v. Construction Laborers Vacation Tr.	463 U.S. 1	1983
Under the "well-pleaded complaint" rule, a defendant may not remove such a case to federal court unless the plaintiff's complaint establishes that the case "arises under" federal law within the meaning of § 1331, and it may not be removed on the basis of a federal defense, including the defense of preemption, even if the defense is anticipated in the complaint and both parties admit that the defense is the only question truly at issue.
Motor Vehicles Manufacturers Association v. State Farm	463 U.S. 29	1983
Bolger v. Youngs Drug Products Corp.	463 U.S. 60	1983
An avertisement about contraception by a contraception manufacturer constitutes commercial speech even when it discusses important societal issues generally, and advertising for contraception relates to activity that is protected from unwarranted governmental interference. Thus, this sort of commercial speech is clearly protected by the First Amendment.
Shaw v. Delta Air Lines, Inc.	463 U.S. 85	1983
Nevada v. United States	463 U.S. 110	1983
All of the parties below are bound by the Orr Ditch decree under res judicata principles. The United States, as a party to the Orr Ditch litigation acting as a representative for the interests of the Reservation and the Project, cannot relitigate the Reservation's water rights with those who could use the Orr Ditch decree as a defense. The Tribe, whose interests were represented in Orr Ditch by the United States, also is bound by the Orr Ditch decree, as are the Orr Ditch defendants and their successors. Moreover, under circumstances where, after the Orr Ditch litigation was commenced, the legal relationships were no longer simply those between the United States and the Tribe, but were also those between the United States, TCID, and the Project landowners, the interests of the Tribe and the Project landowners were sufficiently adverse so that both are now bound by the Orr Ditch decree.
Edward J. DeBartolo Corp. v. NLRB	463 U.S. 147	1983
Container Corp. v. Franchise Tax Bd.	463 U.S. 159	1983
United States v. Mitchell (1983)	463 U.S. 206	1983
City of Revere v. Mass. Gen. Hosp.	463 U.S. 239	1983
The Due Process Clause requires the responsible governmental entity to provide medical care to people who have been injured while being apprehended by the police. However, as long as the governmental entity ensures that the medical care needed is in fact provided, the Constitution does not dictate how the cost of that care should be allocated as between the entity and the provider of the care. That is a matter of state law.
Lehr v. Robertson	463 U.S. 248	1983
Solem v. Helm	463 U.S. 277	1983
Public Serv. Comm'n v. Mid-La. Gas Co.	463 U.S. 319	1983
Jones v. United States (1983)	463 U.S. 354	1983
Mueller v. Allen	463 U.S. 388	1983
United States v. Sells Eng'g, Inc.	463 U.S. 418	1983
United States v. Baggot	463 U.S. 476	1983
Belknap, Inc. v. Hale	463 U.S. 491	1983
Arizona v. San Carlos Apache Tribe	463 U.S. 545	1983
Guardians Ass'n v. Civil Serv. Comm'n	463 U.S. 582	1983
Dirks v. SEC	463 U.S. 646	1983
Ruckelshaus v. Sierra Club	463 U.S. 680	1983
Rice v. Rehner	463 U.S. 713	1983
Jones v. Barnes	463 U.S. 745	1983
Illinois v. Andreas	463 U.S. 765	1983
Marsh v. Chambers	463 U.S. 783	1983
Carpenters v. Scott	463 U.S. 825	1983
Am. Bank & Tr. Co. v. Dallas Cnty.	463 U.S. 855	1983
Barefoot v. Estelle	463 U.S. 880	1983
Barclay v. Florida	463 U.S. 939	1983
California v. Ramos	463 U.S. 992	1983
Michigan v. Long	463 U.S. 1032	1983
Ariz. Governing Comm'n v. Norris	463 U.S. 1073	1983
Illinois v. Batchelder	463 U.S. 1112	1983
California v. Beheler	463 U.S. 1121	1983
Williams v. Missouri	463 U.S. 1301	1983
Capital Cities Media, Inc. v. Toole	463 U.S. 1303	1983
Julian v. United States	463 U.S. 1308	1983
NCAA v. Univ. of Okla.	463 U.S. 1311	1983
Ruckelshaus v. Monsanto Co.	463 U.S. 1315	1983
Bellotti v. Latino Political Action Comm.	463 U.S. 1319	1983
Kemp v. Smith	463 U.S. 1321	1983
Hawaii Housing Auth. v. Midkiff	463 U.S. 1323	1983
Heckler v. Lopez	463 U.S. 1328	1983
McGee v. Alaska	463 U.S. 1339	1983
M I.C., Ltd. v. Bedford Twp.	463 U.S. 1341	1983
Kemp v. Smith	463 U.S. 1344	1983
