= Thompson v. Washington =

- Supreme Court of the United States

Decided October 17, 1977
- Full case name: Thompson v. Washington
- Citations: 434 U.S. 898 (more) 98 S. Ct. 290; 54 L. Ed. 2d 185; 1977 U.S. LEXIS 3607

Holding
- Appeal from Sup. Ct. Wash. dismissed for want of substantial federal question.

Court membership
- Chief Justice Warren E. Burger Associate Justices William J. Brennan Jr. · Potter Stewart; Byron White · Thurgood Marshall; Harry Blackmun · Lewis F. Powell Jr. William Rehnquist · John P. Stevens

Thompson v. Washington, 434 U.S. 898 (1977), was a case dismissed by the Supreme Court of the United States for lack of federal question jurisdiction.

== Background ==
The case was on appeal from the Supreme Court of Washington, and it involved a second degree murder conviction based on the felony murder rule.

== Subsequent developments ==
Thompson v. Washington was cited in the later Washington case State v. Wanrow, 91 Wash.2d 301 (1978), as an endorsement of the constitutionality of the felony murder rule.
