= Bordenkircher v. Hayes =

- Supreme Court of the United States

Decided January 18, 1978
- Full case name: Bordenkircher v. Hayes
- Citations: 434 U.S. 357 (more)

Holding
- A prosecutor may threaten a defendant with more serious charges in order to induce a guilty plea and file those new charges if the defendant does not comply.

Court membership
- Chief Justice Warren E. Burger Associate Justices William J. Brennan Jr. · Potter Stewart; Byron White · Thurgood Marshall; Harry Blackmun · Lewis F. Powell Jr. William Rehnquist · John P. Stevens

Case opinions
- Majority: Stewart, joined by Burger, White, Rehnquist, Stevens
- Dissent: Blackmun, joined by Brennan, Marshall
- Dissent: Powell

Bordenkircher v. Hayes, 434 U.S. 357 (1978), was a United States Supreme Court case in which the court held that a prosecutor may threaten a defendant with more serious charges in order to induce a guilty plea and file those new charges if the defendant does not comply.

== Background ==
Paul Lewis Hayes forged a check worth $88.30. He was indicted in Fayette County, Kentucky on a charge of uttering a forged instrument, an offense then punishable by a term of 2 to 10 years in prison.

After arraignment, the parties discussed a possible plea agreement. The prosecutor offered to recommend a sentence of five years in prison if Hayes would plead guilty. He also said that, if Hayes did not plead guilty and "save the court the inconvenience and necessity of a trial," he would refile the case with charges under the Kentucky Habitual Criminal Act, which would subject Hayes to a mandatory sentence of life imprisonment because of his two prior felony convictions. Hayes chose not to plead guilty, and the prosecutor did seek charges against him under the Habitual Criminal Act.

A jury found Hayes guilty on the principal charge of uttering a forged instrument and, in a separate proceeding, further found that he had twice before been convicted of felonies. As required by the habitual offender statute, he was sentenced to a life term in the penitentiary.

The Kentucky Court of Appeals rejected Hayes' constitutional objections to the enhanced sentence, holding in an unpublished opinion that imprisonment for life with the possibility of parole was constitutionally permissible in light of the previous felonies of which Hayes had been convicted, and that the prosecutor's decision to indict him as a habitual offender was a legitimate use of available leverage in the plea-bargaining process.

On Hayes's petition for a federal writ of habeas corpus, the United States District Court for the Eastern District of Kentucky agreed that there had been no constitutional violation in the sentence or the indictment procedure, and denied the writ. The Court of Appeals for the Sixth Circuit reversed the District Court's judgment. While recognizing "that plea bargaining now plays an important role in our criminal justice system," the appellate court thought that the prosecutor's conduct during the bargaining negotiations had violated the principles of Blackledge v. Perry, which "protect[ed] defendants from the vindictive exercise of a prosecutor's discretion." Accordingly, the court ordered that Hayes be discharged "except for his confinement under a lawful sentence imposed solely for the crime of uttering a forged instrument."

The United States Supreme Court granted certiorari for the case.

== Opinion of the court ==
The Supreme Court issued an opinion on January 18, 1978. According to the Supreme Court, the plea bargaining process does not apply any improper pressure on the defendant because the defendant always retains the option to take the case to trial.

== Aftermath ==
When Bordenkircher was decided, statutes rarely prescribed mandatory minimums. This has changed drastically. Habitual offender statutes like the one in this case are more common, particularly the three strikes laws. Variants that prescribe higher minimum sentences based on certain facts, like the use of a gun in the commission of a crime, are also more common. Police, prosecutors, and judges each employ strategies for avoiding such laws when they consider them too harsh. For example, judges have acquitted factually-guilty defendants of gun charges in proceedings where that would have established a mandatory minimum for other charges for which the judge convicted the defendant.
