= Pfizer Inc. v. Government of India =

- Supreme Court of the United States

Argued November 1, 1977 Decided January 11, 1978
- Full case name: Pfizer Inc., et al. v. Government of India, et al.
- Citations: 434 U.S. 308 (more) 98 S. Ct. 584; 54 L. Ed. 2d 563

Case history
- Prior: Judgment for defendants, 550 F.2d 396 (8th Cir. 1976)

Holding
- A foreign nation is entitled to sue in U.S. courts for treble damages under antitrust laws.

Court membership
- Chief Justice Warren E. Burger Associate Justices William J. Brennan Jr. · Potter Stewart; Byron White · Thurgood Marshall; Harry Blackmun · Lewis F. Powell Jr. William Rehnquist · John P. Stevens

Case opinions
- Majority: Stewart, joined by Brennan, White, Marshall, Stevens
- Dissent: Burger, joined by Powell, Rehnquist
- Dissent: Powell
- Blackmun took no part in the consideration or decision of the case.

Laws applied
- Sherman Act, Clayton Act

Pfizer Inc. v. Government of India, 434 U.S. 308 (1978), decision of the Supreme Court of the United States in which the Court held that foreign states are entitled to sue for treble damages in U.S. courts, and should be recognized as "persons" under the Clayton Act.

== Facts ==
In 1975, the government of India, filed an antitrust suit against pharmaceutical firms Pfizer, Inc., American Cyanamid Company, Bristol-Myers Company, Squibb Corporation, Olin Corporation and The Upjohn Company, alleging that these companies had conspired to restrain and monopolize interstate and foreign trade in the manufacture, distribution, and sale of broad spectrum antibiotics. The Imperial State of Iran, the Republic of the Philippines and the Republic of Vietnam brought similar suits against one or more of these pharmaceutical firms, with the Supreme Court eventually deciding to recognize the additional cases in its ruling.

The constitutional issues at stake in this case surround the U.S. Constitutions recognition of foreign people, entities or governments as "persons" with the right and ability to bring suit in U.S. courts against U.S. registered corporations under U.S. antitrust laws. The government of India had filed suit against these five pharmaceutical companies for damages under the Clayton Antitrust Act for their attempts to restrain and monopolize interstate and foreign trade surrounding the manufacture and distribution of certain broad spectrum antibiotics, in violation the Sherman Act. Accusations included the use of price fixing, market division and fraud committed against the US Patent Office.

=== Clayton Antitrust Act ===
The Clayton Antitrust Act was enacted in 1914 to add additional substance to U.S. antitrust law by seeking to prevent certain anti-competitive practices during their inception, and continued a regime that started with the Sherman Antitrust Act of 1890. The Clayton Act specified particular prohibited conduct, outlined specific exemptions to the law, and provided for a tri-level enforcement regimen including measure intended to remediate prohibited conduct, expanding on the consumer protections that were provided under the earlier enacted Sherman Antitrust Act.

=== Sherman Antitrust Act ===
Enacted by Congress in 1890, the Sherman Antitrust Act was the first federal law that prohibited business practices that were considered to be harmful to consumers, specifically those that were deemed to reduce marketplace competition. The act continues to serve as the basis for most antitrust litigation in federal courts.

=== Defense ===
The pharmaceutical companies involved in the suit were seeking to invalidate the case by appealing to the United States Court of Appeals 8th Circuit under the defense that non-US companies were not persons as defined under the Clayton and Sherman acts, making them ineligible to seek treble damages in the U.S. court system. The court Court of Appeals ruled against the defendants, finding that that treble-damages for persons injured by antitrust violations was first provided in section 7 of the Sherman Act, and was re-enacted without substantial change in 1914 in section 4 of the Clayton Act.

Unsuccessful in invalidating their case through the 8th Circuit Court of Appeals, the defendants appealed to the U.S. Supreme Court asking the court to clarify the definition of 'persons' under the Clayton and Sherman acts, as section 8 of the Clayton act states:

"[A]ny person who shall be injured in his business or property by reason of anything forbidden in the antitrust laws may sue therefore in any district court of the United States in the district in which the defendant resides or is found or has an agent, without respect to the amount in controversy, and shall recover threefold the damages by him sustained, and the cost of suit, including a reasonable attorney's fee."

== Judgment ==
The opinion of the Supreme Court was delivered by Justice Potter Stewart. The Court ruled for the government of India, affirming that a foreign nation otherwise entitled to sue in U.S. courts is entitled to sue for damages under the antitrust laws to the same extent as any other plaintiff. The fact that the respondents are sovereign foreign entities is not reason to deny them the remedy of treble damages the U.S. Congress has afforded to any person negatively affected by violations of U.S. or international antitrust laws. The Justices referred to the Sherman and Clayton antitrust laws in their ruling, as well as a prior ruling favoring the State of Georgia's right to sue in Georgia v. Evans.

Justice Stewart further stated in his opinion:

The result we reach does not involve any novel concept of the jurisdiction of the federal courts. This Court has long recognized the rule that a foreign nation is generally entitled to prosecute any civil claim in the courts of the United States upon the same basis as a domestic corporation or individual might do.

The majority reasoned that a foreign nation is entitled to pursue damages when it its business or property has suffered damages caused by another entities antitrust violations. When a foreign nation conducts business in U.S. commercial markets, it can be victimized by anti-competitive practices in the same manner as a domestic U.S. State of private person.

The issue of person-hood for a sovereign government was supported by prior case law, with Justice Stewart referring to two specific cases to support the majority argument. Both the United States v. Cooper Corp and Georgia v. Evans cases considered the rights of person-hood for government entities. While the Cooper case rules that the United States Government was not to be considered a "person" under US antitrust laws, the court ruled in Georgia v. Evans that the state was allowed consideration as a person. The decision did not rest on Georgia's status as a state but that unlike the federal government in the U.S. v. Cooper Corp ruling, the State of Georgia had been given no other remedy to enforce the prohibitions of the laws in question. Like the State of Georgia, the Government of India also had no other remedy outside of the court system.

=== Dissent ===
Chief Justice Burger dissented the ruling, joined by Justices Powell and Rehnquist. In his dissent, Justice Burger stated that a foreign nations entitlement to bring damage actions in U.S. courts against domestic suppliers for alleged violations of antitrust laws was never considered when the Sherman and Clayton Acts were enacted, and that the Clayton and Sherman acts did not extend the right of person-hood to foreign powers.

Chief Justice Burger indicated in his dissent his dismay at the majority's recognition of a foreign government as a person under the Clayton and Sherman antitrust laws, while also noting that the majority option conceded that the question of application of the Sherman and Clayton Acts to foreign governments was never considered at the time the laws were enacted. He also referred to prior judgements under these acts, including the much more specific definition of person in the Clayton act. Citing the case of Blue Chip Stamps v. Manor Drug Stores, Chief Justice Burger highlighted the courts reliance on the specific definition of persons as outlined in the Clayton act, specifically the mention of foreign corporations and associations existing under or authorized laws of any foreign country as entities covered under the Act, but no mention the governments of foreign countries.

== See also ==
- US antitrust law
