= Christiansburg Garment Co. v. Equal Employment Opportunity Commission =

- Supreme Court of the United States

Argued November 28, 1977 Decided January 23, 1978
- Full case name: Christiansburg Garment Co. v. Equal Employment Opportunity Commission
- Citations: 434 U.S. 412 (more) 98 S. Ct. 694; 54 L. Ed. 2d 648; 16 Fair Empl. Prac. Cas. (BNA) 502; 15 Empl. Prac. Dec. (CCH) ¶ 8041

Court membership
- Chief Justice Warren E. Burger Associate Justices William J. Brennan Jr. · Potter Stewart; Byron White · Thurgood Marshall; Harry Blackmun · Lewis F. Powell Jr. William Rehnquist · John P. Stevens

Case opinion
- Majority: Stewart, joined by Burger, Brennan, White, Marshall, Powell, Rehnquist, Stevens
- Blackmun took no part in the consideration or decision of the case.

Laws applied
- Civil Rights Act of 1964

Christiansburg Garment Co. v. Equal Employment Opportunity Commission, 434 U.S. 412 (1978), was a case decided by the Supreme Court of the United States that interpreted 42 U.S.C. §1988(b) to generally not require unsuccessful plaintiffs in civil rights cases to pay attorney's fees to the defendant. There would be an exception, however, for plaintiffs that brought frivolous claims. This decision has essentially helped create one way fee shifting for plaintiffs in civil rights cases.
