= Quilloin v. Walcott =

- Supreme Court of the United States

Decided January 10, 1978
- Full case name: Quilloin v. Walcott
- Citations: 434 U.S. 246 (more)

Holding
- An absentee and unwed father has no substantive due process right to intervene in an adoption of the child.

Court membership
- Chief Justice Warren E. Burger Associate Justices William J. Brennan Jr. · Potter Stewart; Byron White · Thurgood Marshall; Harry Blackmun · Lewis F. Powell Jr. William Rehnquist · John P. Stevens

Case opinion
- Majority: Marshall, joined by unanimous

Quilloin v. Walcott, 434 U.S. 246 (1978), was a United States Supreme Court family law case in which the court held that an absentee and unwed father has no substantive due process right to intervene in an adoption of the child.

== Background ==
Under Georgia law, no adoption of a child born in wedlock was permitted without the consent of each living parent (including divorced or separated parents) who had not voluntarily surrendered rights in the child or been adjudicated an unfit parent. In contrast, §§ 74-403(3) and 74-203 of the Georgia Code provided that only the mother's consent was required for the adoption of an illegitimate child. However, the father could acquire veto authority over the adoption if he had legitimated the child pursuant to § 74-103 of the Code.

These provisions were applied to deny Quilloin, the biological father of an illegitimate child, authority to prevent the adoption of the child by the husband of the child's mother, Walcott. Until the adoption petition was filed, appellant had not attempted to legitimate the 11-year-old child, who had always been in the mother's custody and was then living with the mother and her husband. In opposing the adoption, Quilloin, seeking to legitimate the child but not to secure custody, claimed that §§ 74-203 and 74-403(3), as applied to his case, violated the Due Process and Equal Protection Clauses of the Fourteenth Amendment. The trial court, granting the adoption on the ground that it was in the "best interests of the child" and that legitimation by appellant was not, rejected Quilloin's constitutional claims, and the Supreme Court of Georgia affirmed.

== Opinion of the court ==
The Supreme Court issued an opinion on January 10, 1978.

== Later developments ==
In 1979, the Supreme Court held in Caban v. Mohammed that an unmarried father who was involved in the child's life could intervene in an adoption.
