= Baby Richard case =

1991–1995 custody battle in Illinois, US

The Baby Richard case was a highly publicized custody battle that took place over Danny Kirchner, a young child whose adoption was revoked when his biological father, Otakar Kirchner, won custody in a case that was decided in 1995 by the Illinois Supreme Court. The child became known as "Baby Richard" in widespread media coverage.

== Background ==
The child was brought to his adoptive home four days after his March 16, 1991, birth by Jay and Kim Warburton of Schaumburg, Illinois, who pursued a private adoption with the consent of the child's biological mother, Daniela Janikova. Janikova had been living with the child's biological father, Otakar Kirchner, until a few weeks before the birth of the child when she moved out following an argument. Court records show that Janikova subsequently told Kirchner that the baby had died. Despite being told of the death, Kirchner searched for confirmation with local hospitals and by searching public records. Two months after Richard was born, a friend of the biological mother told Kirchner the truth, and he intervened in the adoption proceedings to gain custody of his son.

== Events of the custody battle ==
The Warburtons fought to keep the child. The Circuit Court of Cook County, Illinois upheld Kirchner's paternity of the child and his right to intervene in December 1991, but a subsequent ruling declared him an unfit parent and permitted the adoption to proceed. Because the request to block the adoption had not occurred within 30 days of the child's birth, as required by Illinois adoption law, the Circuit Court ruling was upheld. An appeal was filed with the Illinois Supreme Court who agreed to hear the case.

Three years after the birth of the child, in June 1994, the Illinois Supreme Court ruled that the Circuit Court of Cook County and the Illinois Appellate Court had wrongly terminated Kirchner's parental rights, and the adoption was improper. Under Illinois law, courts can only consider a child's best interests if a biological parent is determined to be unfit. Justice James Heiple issued the order requiring that the child be removed from his home and turned over to Kirchner, whom he had never met. The Warburtons filed petitions with the United States Supreme Court seeking to stay and overturn the enforcement of the Illinois Supreme Court decision; however, these petitions were denied.

== Following the Supreme Court ruling ==
In January 1995, Kirchner, seeking enforcement of the Illinois Supreme Court's ruling, filed a Petition for Habeas Corpus. The petition was granted. On April 30, 1995, Danny Warburton / Kirchner was transferred from the Warburtons to the care of his father as television and print reporters documented the event. The birth parents separated in 1996, but later reconciled. In 1997, Daniela Kirchner petitioned to regain the parental rights she had originally relinquished so that she would be Daniel's legal parent along with Otakar. This briefly raised the possibility of reopening the custody battle, but the Illinois Supreme Court ruled to dismiss the petition, effectively shutting the door to further legal battles. In March 1998, the Kirchners had a second child, a daughter.

== Media attention ==
Los Angeles talk radio host Dennis Prager spent more than a month on his weekday radio show discussing this case and criticizing the Illinois Supreme Court Decision, and held a "Rally for Baby Richard" where actors Priscilla Presley, Tom Selleck, and John McCook also spoke. Nationally syndicated Chicago Tribune columnist and author Bob Greene wrote numerous times about the case, decrying the transfer of "Baby Richard" from his adoptive to his biological parents.

Karen Moriarty, a therapist for the biological parents, told the Chicago Sun-Times in 2003 that Danny had adjusted well to life after the custody battle. She documented the case in the book Baby Richard: A Four-Year-Old Comes Home. Moriarty decried the media's treatment of the Kirchners, and said that Bob Greene never spoke to Kirchner or Janikova in spite of writing so frequently on the case. Following the transfer, Otakar filed a lawsuit against Greene and the Chicago Tribune claiming defamation. The case against Greene and the Chicago Tribune was dismissed by an Illinois court on February 6, 1998.

== See also ==
- Adoption in the United States
- Baby Jessica case
