= Motor Vehicles Manufacturers Ass'n v. State Farm Mutual Automobile Insurance Co. =

Motor Vehicle Manufacturers Association v. State Farm
- Supreme Court of the United States

Argued April 26, 1983 Decided June 24, 1983
- Full case name: Motor Vehicle Manufacturers Association of the United States, Inc., et al. v. State Farm Automobile Insurance Company et al; Consumer Alert, et al. v. State Farm Mutual Automobile Insurance Company et al.; United States Department of Transportation, et al. v. State Farm Mutual Automobile Insurance Company et al.
- Docket no.: 82-354-56
- Citations: 463 U.S. 29 (more) 103 S. Ct. 2856; 77 L. Ed. 2d 443; 13 Envtl L. Rep. 20,672
- Argument: Oral argument

Case history
- Prior: State Farm Mutual Automobile Insurance Co. v. Dept. of Transportation, 680 F.2d 206 (D.C. Cir. 1982); cert. granted, 459 U.S. 987 (1982).

Holding
- The standard of review for rescinding notice and comment rules is the same as that for enacting rules. The rescission was arbitrary and capricious for failing to consider the alternative of requiring airbags and dismissing too quickly the benefits of automatic seat belts.

Court membership
- Chief Justice Warren E. Burger Associate Justices William J. Brennan Jr. · Byron White; Thurgood Marshall · Harry Blackmun; Lewis F. Powell Jr. · William Rehnquist; John P. Stevens · Sandra Day O'Connor

Case opinions
- Majority: White, joined by unanimous (Parts I-IV, V-A); Brennan, Marshall, Blackmun, Stevens (Part V-B, VI)
- Concur/dissent: Rehnquist, joined by Burger, Powell, O'Connor

Laws applied
- Administrative Procedure Act

Motor Vehicle Manufacturers Association v. State Farm Mutual Automobile Insurance Co., 463 U.S. 29 (1983), commonly known in U.S. administrative law as State Farm, is a United States Supreme Court decision concerning regulations requiring passive restraints in cars. Decided in 1983, one year before Chevron U.S.A., Inc. v. Natural Resources Defense Council, Inc., the Court found that the National Highway Traffic Safety Administration (NHTSA) had not provided a "reasoned analysis" for rescinding regulations that required either airbags or automatic seat belts in new cars.

It held that the arbitrary and capricious standard for reviewing agency action to enact regulations also applied to changing regulations. The Court argued the NHTSA's regulation rescissions were arbitrary and capricious for two reasons:

1. The agency did not consider alternatives like requiring all cars to have airbags.
2. The agency did not provide any evidence for its findings that automatic seat belts would not increase seat belt usage, even though the record evidence included surveys of drivers showing that seat belt usage more than doubled over manual seat belts.

The case is noteworthy not only for its effects on car safety but also in clarifying the Court's approach to reviewing agency actions under the Administrative Procedure Act.

== Background ==
The National Traffic and Motor Vehicle Safety Act of 1966 directs the National Highway Traffic Safety Administration (NHTSA) to issue safety standards that "shall be practicable, meet the need for motor vehicle safety, and be stated in objective terms." The resulting regulations went through a tumultuous history, with over 60 rulemaking notices having been amended, rescinded, reimposed, and then re-rescinded.

The original rulemaking simply mandated seat belts. However, that soon proved to be ineffective, as seat belt usage rates remained below 50 percent during that period. The NHTSA proposed using passive restraint systems, devices that would protect drivers even if drivers took no action other than that necessary to drive the car. The two main proposed mechanisms were automatic seat belts and airbags. In 1969, the NHTSA proposed a standard requiring installation of some kind of passive restraint for drivers, which was later amended to include all front seat passengers. The regulations adopted required passive restraints for vehicles built after 1975 and allowed those built between 1973 and 1975 to use a system in which the car would start only if the seatbelt was in use.

The ignition interlock option lacked popularity and resulted in Congress passing the Motor Vehicle and Schoolbus Safety Amendments of 1974, which disallowed ignition interlocks and required restraint systems other than seat belts to be approved by congressional resolution before going into effect.

In 1976, the optional alternatives were extended indefinitely by Secretary of Transportation William T. Coleman Jr., and the passive restraint requirement suspended because of expected public resistance. They were then reinstated by Coleman's successor, Brock Adams, and then they were re-rescinded by his successor, Andrew L. Lewis Jr. The last rescission is the action that the Supreme Court reviewed.

The NHTSA justified the rescission by saying that there was no longer sufficient evidence for the efficacy of the regulations. That was because of not a change in judgment about the technology but a change in car manufacturers' plans. Whereas the NHTSA originally estimated that 40% of new cars would have automatic seat belts, it turned out that 99% of cars would use them. In addition, they were going to use a detachable type of automatic seat belt, which could easily be detached, when they would operate like normal seat belts. The NHTSA also worried that the change would be expensive and sour the public's view towards safety regulations, as it would be seen as a wasteful, imposing example of bureaucratic overreach.

Though the DC Circuit found that rescinding a rule has "parallels" to failing to act and agency's failure to act was subject to only "very narrow" review, thus suggesting a narrow review in the case of rescission, it still vacated the rescission partially because of congressional action in response to NHTSA regulations, which it saw as heightening the standard of review. It gave the following reasons for vacating the rescission: there was insufficient evidence to sustain the conclusion that it could not predict an increase in seat belt usage and "only a well-justified refusal to seek more evidence could render rescission non-arbitrary," the NHTSA had inadequately considered the possibility of requiring nondetachable automatic seat belts, and it had inadequately considered the possibility of requiring airbags.

== Decision ==
Justice White, writing for the majority, disagreed with the DC Circuit and held that the scope of judicial review is the same for rescission as it is for enacting regulations in the first place. The Supreme Court explicitly rejected the view that it should treat rescission the same as a refusal to regulate in the first place: "The Motor Vehicle Safety Act expressly equates orders 'revoking' and 'establishing' safety standards; neither that Act nor the APA suggests that revocations are to be treated as refusals to promulgate standards."

It also rejected the view that the congressional action, after the enactment of the National Traffic and Motor Vehicle Safety Act, had affected the standard of review even if it could inform the Court's interpretation of the statute.

However, the Court agreed with the DC Circuit that the rescission was arbitrary and capricious for failing to consider the possibility of requiring airbags. Although agencies need not consider every possible alternative, requiring air bags was an obvious option since that was part of the original regulations. The fact that the car companies, which, according to the Court, had "waged the regulatory equivalent of war" against airbags, would try to evade the regulations was not a reason to repeal them. The Court also refused to consider rationales that the NHTSA raised in court but had failed to raise in the original order.

Although the Court considered this a "closer issue," it held the rescission to be also arbitrary and capricious, based on the dismissal of automatic seat belts' effectiveness.

=== Concurring opinion ===
In a concurrence, Justice Rehnquist defended agencies that changed their minds on policy issues because of a changing political climate. He noted that the NHTSA's change of heart on safety regulations likely reflected the election of President Ronald Reagan but defended that as a reason for agency reconsideration of previously adopted rules:

The agency's changed view of the standard seems to be related to the election of a new President of a different political party. It is readily apparent that the responsible members of one administration may consider public resistance and uncertainties to be more important than do their counterparts in a previous administration. A change in administration brought about by the people casting their votes is a perfectly reasonable basis for an executive agency's reappraisal of the costs and benefits of its programs and regulations. As long as the agency remains within the bounds established by Congress, it is entitled to assess administrative records and evaluate priorities in light of the philosophy of the administration.

== Arbitrary and capricious review ==
The decision is notable for laying out the Supreme Court's interpretation of arbitrary and capricious review, also known as "hard look" review, as set out by the Administrative Procedure Act:

[A] reviewing court may not set aside an agency rule that is rational, based on consideration of the relevant factors and within the scope of the authority delegated to the agency by the statute ... The scope of review under the "arbitrary and capricious" standard is narrow and a court is not to substitute its judgment for that of the agency. Nevertheless, the agency must examine the relevant data and articulate a satisfactory explanation for its action including a rational connection between the facts found and the choice made. In reviewing that explanation, we must consider whether the decision was based on a consideration of the relevant factors and whether there has been a clear error of judgment. Normally, an agency rule would be arbitrary and capricious if the agency has relied on factors which Congress has not intended it to consider, entirely failed to consider an important aspect of the problem, offered an explanation for its decision that runs counter to the evidence before the agency, or is so implausible that it could not be ascribed to a difference in view or the product of agency expertise ... We may not supply a reasoned basis for the agency's action that the agency itself has not given. We will, however, uphold a decision of less than ideal clarity if the agency's path may reasonably be discerned.

== Legacy ==
Following the decision, automakers increasingly installed airbags in vehicles. The case has also become a leading precedent on judicial review of agency action and is frequently cited in administrative law alongside Chevron U.S.A., Inc. v. Natural Resources Defense Council.
