= Caban v. Mohammed =

- Supreme Court of the United States

Argued November 6, 1978 Decided April 24, 1979
- Full case name: Abdiel Caban, Appellant, v. Kazim Mohammed and Maria Mohammed.
- Docket no.: 77-6431
- Citations: 441 U.S. 380 (more) 99 S. Ct. 1760; 60 L. Ed. 2d 297; 1979 U.S. LEXIS 92

Case history
- Prior: Matter of David A.C., 56 A.D.2d 627, 391 N.Y.S.2d 846 (App. Div. 2d Dept. 1977); appeal dismissed, 43 N.Y.2d 708, 401 N.Y.S.2d 208, 372 N.E.2d 42 (1977); probable jurisdiction noted, 436 U.S. 903 (1978).

Holding
- The sex-based distinction in New York's Domestic Relations Law between unmarried mothers and unmarried fathers violates the Equal Protection Clause of the Fourteenth Amendment because it bears no substantial relation to any important state interest.

Court membership
- Chief Justice Warren E. Burger Associate Justices William J. Brennan Jr. · Potter Stewart; Byron White · Thurgood Marshall; Harry Blackmun · Lewis F. Powell Jr. William Rehnquist · John P. Stevens

Case opinions
- Majority: Powell, joined by Brennan, White, Marshall, Blackmun
- Dissent: Stewart
- Dissent: Stevens, joined by Burger, Rehnquist

Laws applied
- Equal Protection Clause

Caban v. Mohammed, 441 U.S. 380 (1979), was a United States Supreme Court family law case which held that a New York law, which allowed unwed mothers, but not unwed fathers, a veto over the adoption of that couple's children, was discriminatory, and violated the equal protection clause of the Fourteenth Amendment.

== Background ==
At the time of this case, § 111 of New York's Domestic Relations Law required any adoption of a child to be limited by the consent of either married parent of a child, but only the mother in the case that the parents had never married. The law, in part, read:

consent to adoption shall be required as follows: . . .

(b) Of the parents ... of a child born in wedlock; [and]

(c) Of the mother ... of a child born out of wedlock. . . .

Abdiel Caban and his partner Maria Gonazles lived together for five years, during which time they had a son, and later, a daughter. After separating in 1973, Maria later married Kazim Mohammed. Two years later, Kazim filed to legally adopt the children. Caban and his new wife Nina also filed for adoption, but due to § 111, that attempt was blocked, and the Mohammeds' request was granted. Caban appealed unsuccessfully to the New York Supreme Court, Appellate Division and then the New York Court of Appeals, after which he appealed to the United States Supreme Court, arguing violations of both equal protection and due process.

New York argued for the law's distinction, expressing the concern that allowing an unwed father to veto his child's adoption might have the effect of discouraging adoption, which would not be in the best interests of the children.

== Opinion of the Court ==
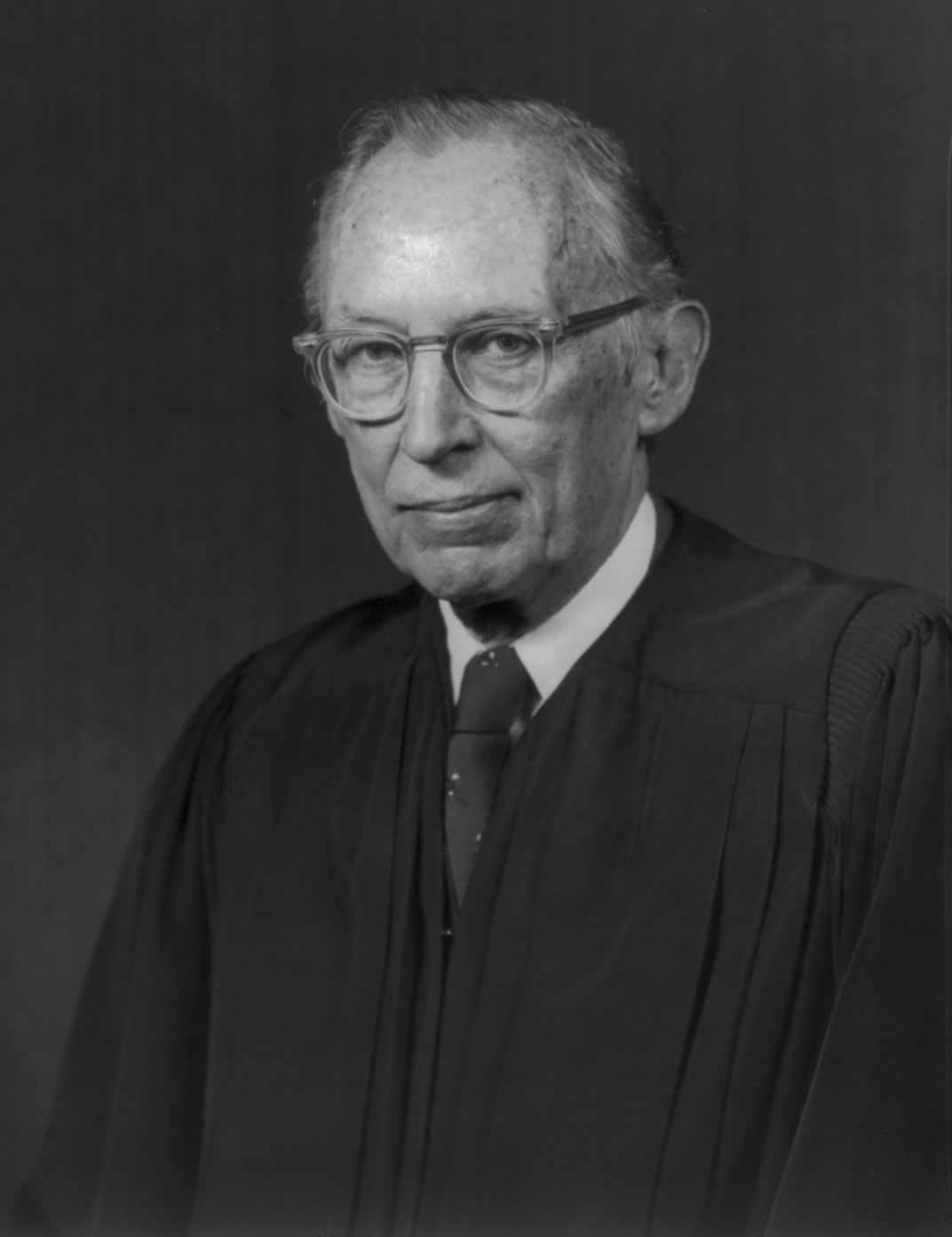
Justice Lewis Powell delivered the opinion of the Court.

The Court split 5–4, with Justice Lewis F. Powell, Jr. writing the majority opinion. That opinion found that § 111 of New York's Domestic Relations Law unconstitutionally discriminated on the basis of sex, conflicting with the Fourteenth Amendment's guarantee of equal protection, using an intermediate level of judicial scrutiny. Powell's reasoning argued that Caban's formation of a "natural family", through five years of living with his partner and the children, entitled him to legal rights to those children. Moreover, Powell found that treating mothers and fathers differently in § 111 did not "bear a substantial relation to the State's interest in providing adoptive homes for its illegitimate children."

Powell's opinion declined to decide whether there was also a due process violation, or whether there was an additional equal protection issue in treating fathers differentially depending on whether or not they had been legally married.

=== Dissent ===
Stewart's dissent, on the other hand, found no violation of equal protection. Stewart believed that the process of carrying the child to term was a situational difference between mothers and fathers which, along with the state's interest in having illegitimate children adopted, provided a legitimate basis for the differential treatment of unwed mothers and fathers in § 111. Similarly, Stevens' dissent found a strong interest in promoting adoption and that maternity created a significant difference in physical and psychological parenting between biological mothers and fathers.

== Subsequent developments ==
As a result of the ruling, Caban regained the visitation rights he had enjoyed before the original decision granting adoption to Kazim Mohammed.

== See also ==
- Quilloin v. Walcott (1978), holding that an absentee and unwed father does not have these rights.
