= Americans for Safe Access v. Drug Enforcement Administration =

2013 court case in the United States

Americans for Safe Access v. Drug Enforcement Administration was a case concerning federal drug policy and the legal status of medical cannabis in the United States. It addressed the ongoing debate over whether cannabis should remain a Schedule I substance under the Controlled Substances Act, a classification reserved for drugs with no accepted medical use and a high potential for abuse. The U.S. Court of Appeals for the D.C. Circuit ultimately ruled in favor of the DEA, upholding the agency's denial of a petition to reschedule cannabis and finding that the DEA's determination that cannabis lacks "adequate and well-controlled studies proving efficacy" was supported by substantial evidence and not arbitrary or capricious.

== Ruling ==
The U.S. Court of Appeals for the D.C. Circuit held that the DEA's denial of a petition by plaintiff Americans for Safe Access for removal of cannabis from Schedule I of the Controlled Substances Act survives review under the deferential arbitrary and capricious standard. 21 U.S.C. § 812(b)(1)(B) requires that cannabis be found to have no "currently accepted medical use" in order to remain in Schedule I. The DEA, pursuant to regulations that the court had approved in Alliance for Cannabis Therapeutics v. DEA, interpreted this to require "adequate and well-controlled studies proving efficacy" in order for cannabis to be removed from Schedule I. The court deferred to the agency's interpretation and found that substantial evidence supported the DEA's determination that such studies do not exist. This case was the third attempt to get the D.C. Circuit to order that cannabis be rescheduled.
