= Baby Jessica case =

1990s American custody case

Baby Jessica
- Born: Anna Jacqueline Schmidt; 1991 (age 34–35); Ann Arbor, Michigan
- Known for: A case in 1993
- Mother: Cara Clausen

The "Baby Jessica" case was a highly publicized custody battle in Ann Arbor, Michigan in the early 1990s between Jan and Roberta DeBoer, the couple who attempted to adopt the child, and her biological parents, Daniel Schmidt and Cara Clausen. In August 1993, the supreme courts of Iowa and Michigan ordered her returned to Schmidt, who named her Anna Jacqueline Schmidt. The case was widely publicized as the "Baby Jessica" case after the name given her by the DeBoers. The case name is In re Clausen 442 Mich. 648 (1993).

== Overview ==
Anna was born in 1991 to 29 year old Cara Clausen, who placed her for adoption with Jan and Roberta DeBoer without telling Schmidt that he was the father. She also put a different man's name on the birth certificate, further obscuring paternity. The adoption process was handled by the DeBoers' attorney, whom Clausen erroneously thought was also her attorney. Five days after the birth, Clausen changed her mind, informed Schmidt of his paternity, and told the DeBoers that she wanted to cancel the adoption.

Clausen had already relinquished her parental rights so there was nothing that she could do. But Schmidt had not relinquished his parental rights so he could and did stop the adoption proceedings. The DeBoers, however, believing that the most important issue was the best interest of the child, rather than parental rights, attempted to complete the adoption.

Clausen and Schmidt, who were married in 1992, continued in the courts to get the child returned to them. The DeBoers, who had named the baby "Jessica," battled to keep the child for two and a half years, but ultimately lost. The Iowa Supreme Court noted Daniel Schmidt had from previous relationships, two children whom he largely failed to financially support and with whom he failed to maintain meaningful contact.

Because the adoption process had never been completed, the Michigan court decided to give full faith and credit to the sister state judgment from Iowa and order child to be returned to her biological parents. Anna had several visitations with her biological parents before the transfer. The United States Supreme Court denied a stay of the transfer.

Roberta "Robby" DeBoer later wrote a book called Losing Jessica about the case, and the DeBoers established a child group called Hear My Voice that advocated for children involved in difficult custody cases, with a pro-adoptive parent angle.

The DeBoers adopted a newborn boy named Casey in 1994, nine months after returning Anna. In 1999 they divorced, and although they remarried, they divorced again. The Schmidts divorced close to the same time as the DeBoers. They went on to share custody of Anna and their second daughter.

Anna said in 2003 that she has no memory of the DeBoers and was doing well with her biological family.

== Film portrayal ==
A TV movie dramatizing the events, Whose Child Is This? The War for Baby Jessica was produced, but was criticized by some for being biased in favor of the DeBoers. In the film, the DeBoers, who were better educated than the Schmidts and had a better financial position, were portrayed as an affluent, ideal family for the child, while the Schmidts were portrayed as unsuitable parents.

== See also ==
- Baby Richard case
- Adoption in the United States
- Adoption fraud
- Adoptive Couple v. Baby Girl
