= Scheidler v. National Organization for Women =

Scheidler v. National Organization for Women may refer to:

- Scheidler v. National Organization for Women (2003), 537 U.S. 393 (2003)
- Scheidler v. National Organization for Women (2006), 547 U.S. 9 (2006)

== See also ==
- National Organization for Women v. Scheidler, 510 U.S. 249 (1994)
