= United States v. White Mountain Apache Tribe =

- Supreme Court of the United States

Argued December 2, 2002 Decided March 4, 2003
- Full case name: United States v. White Mountain Apache Tribe
- Citations: 537 U.S. 465 (more) 123 S. Ct. 1126; 155 L. Ed. 2d 40

Case history
- Prior: White Mountain Apache Tribe v. United States, 46 Fed.Cl. 20 (1999); White Mountain Apache Tribe v. United States, 249 F.3d 1364 (Fed. Cir. 2001)

Holding
- Affirmed Circuit Court, held that when the federal government used land or property held in trust for an Indian tribe, it had the duty to maintain that land or property and was liable for any damages for a breach of that duty.

Court membership
- Chief Justice William Rehnquist Associate Justices John P. Stevens · Sandra Day O'Connor; Antonin Scalia · Anthony Kennedy; David Souter · Clarence Thomas; Ruth Bader Ginsburg · Stephen Breyer

Case opinions
- Majority: Souter, joined by Stevens, O'Connor, Ginsburg, Breyer
- Concurrence: Ginsburg, joined by Breyer
- Dissent: Thomas, joined by Rehnquist, Scalia, Kennedy

Laws applied
- 28 U.S.C. § 1491(a); 28 U.S.C. § 1505

United States v. White Mountain Apache Tribe, 537 U.S. 465 (2003), was a case in which the Supreme Court of the United States held in a 5–4 decision that when the federal government used land or property held in trust for an Indian tribe, it had the duty to maintain that land or property and was liable for any damages for a breach of that duty. In the 1870s, the White Mountain Apache Tribe was placed on a reservation in Arizona. The case involved Fort Apache, a collection of buildings on the reservation which were transferred to the tribe by the United States Congress in 1960.

Although the tribe owned the Fort Apache buildings, they were held in trust and used exclusively by the federal government for an Indian school. This was a continuation of the building's use from when the federal government retained title. As more schools were built at other Indian reservations, attendance dropped at the Fort Apache school. The tribe began to plan for use of the buildings and sought designation as a historic site. When the federal government wanted to turn the property over to the tribe for use, the tribe found that the property had deteriorated and sued for damages to the property. The trial court denied the tribe's claim, but the Circuit Court of Appeals reversed, holding that the federal government had a duty to take care of the property. The government then appealed to the U.S. Supreme Court, arguing that the tribe could not make a claim without Congressional authorization. The tribe argued that the 1960 act created the trust and authorized damages.

The Supreme Court affirmed the appellate court, holding that the federal government used the property it held in trust, and that it therefore had a duty to maintain the property. Justice Ginsburg issued a concurring opinion, while Justice Thomas dissented. The loss led the government to settle with the tribe for $12 million. The buildings are managed by the Fort Apache Heritage Foundation and the case, along with several others define the Indian Trust Doctrine. The case has been widely discussed in legal literature and books, primarily in the area of Indian trusts.

== Background ==
=== History ===
In 1869 Major John Green led a force to the White River area and recommended that an outpost be established there. In 1870 Fort Apache was established by the United States Army in Arizona and remained an active military installation until 1922, when it was transferred to the Department of the Interior (DOI). A series of Executive Orders by President Ulysses S. Grant from 1871 to 1877 established the Fort Apache Indian Reservation, with the actual fort being held by the government as fee simple land. From 1897 to 1922 the fort was in the middle of the reservation. Under the terms of the transfer, 400 acres (1.6 km^{2}) were set aside for the Theodore Roosevelt Indian School.

The school initially housed 250 Navajo and Hopi children, and additional buildings were constructed to accommodate them. Between 1933 and 1939, the Bureau of Indian Affairs (BIA) used the site for its regional trachoma school, using both laboratory animals and Indian children for experiments to treat the eye disease. During World War II, the school taught students from a good number of southwestern tribes. During the 1950s, as the tribe was fighting against termination, the emphasis of the school was on vocational and technical training. Beginning in 1960, the BIA contracted for schools to be built near other tribes, and attendance at the school started to drop.

In 1960, Congress provided that Fort Apache was to be held in trust for the White Mountain Apache Tribe, but allowed the DOI to use the property for "administrative or school purposes." By the 1970s, most of the other tribes had obtained their own schools, and the school normally had fewer than 100 students. With the reduction in the number of students, the BIA budget for Fort Apache also dropped, causing deferred maintenance and the demolition of several buildings.

The tribe resolved to place the site on the National Historic Registry. In 1976, the National Park Service designated the site as a National Historic Site. By 1993, the tribe had adopted a master plan to try to preserve the buildings and commissioned a study to determine what the cost would be to restore the property. The U.S. government acknowledged that some of the thirty-five buildings were in poor shape, but maintained that the rest were properly maintained. In 1998, the site was designated by the World Monuments Fund as one of the 100 most endangered sites.

=== Federal Claims Court ===
In 1999, the tribe filed suit in the United States Court of Federal Claims, seeking $14,000,000 in damages for breach of trust by DOI. The tribe argued that the United States had exclusive control over the buildings and allowed them to fall into disrepair, a violation of the trust relationship established by the 1960 statute. Additionally, the tribe claimed that the Snyder Act and the National Historic Preservation Act applied in this case. The Snyder Act deals with appropriations to the BIA, and the National Historic Preservation Act discussed federal assistance for preservation programs. The United States moved for dismissal on the basis of lack of subject matter jurisdiction and failure to state a claim. In addition, the United States claimed that the statute of limitations had run under both the Tucker Act and the Indian Tucker Act, the acts governing claims in the Federal Court of Claims. The trial court dismissed the suit on the failure to state a claim.

=== Federal Circuit Court of Appeals ===
The tribe then appealed the case to the United States Court of Appeals for the Federal Circuit. The appellate court found that various federal laws required the DOI and BIA to maintain historic buildings and to maintain Indian trust properties, but that they did not authorize monetary damages. The court then looked to the 1960 act and determined that this act did create a trust relationship that could be enforced with monetary damages. This was based on common law, with the court referencing the Restatement (Second) of Trusts to outline that a trust requires a trustee (the United States), a beneficiary (the tribe), and a trust body (the land and buildings). The court noted that both parties agreed that there was a trust, but not that damages were authorized. The court held that where the United States had control over the use and maintenance of the buildings to the exclusion of the tribe, a fiduciary duty was created that authorized the tribe to seek monetary damages. The court then reversed and remanded the decision of the trial court. The United States appealed, and the Supreme Court granted certiorari.

== Supreme Court ==
=== Arguments ===
Gregory G. Garre, Assistant Solicitor General argued the case for the United States. As the petitioner, Garre argued that the 1960 act did not authorize monetary damages for a breach of trust duties. Their position was that while a trust was formed, the tribe could not make a claim for damages without explicit congressional authorization. Further, he argued, the exclusive control does not create liability; only the explicit language of statutes and regulations could allow monetary damages. The position of the United States was that "in trust" meant was that the land was not subject to alienation or to state taxation.

Robert C. Brauchli, an attorney from Arizona, argued the case for the White Mountain Apache Tribe. As respondent, Brauchli argued that the 1960 act, by using the term "trust", did create liability for monetary damages. Since a trust was formed by law, the Indian Tucker Act allowed a lawsuit for damages to go forward. The tribe noted that the trust relationship was "one of the primary cornerstones of Indian law". The National Congress of American Indians filed an amicus curiae brief supporting the tribe.

=== Opinion of the Court ===
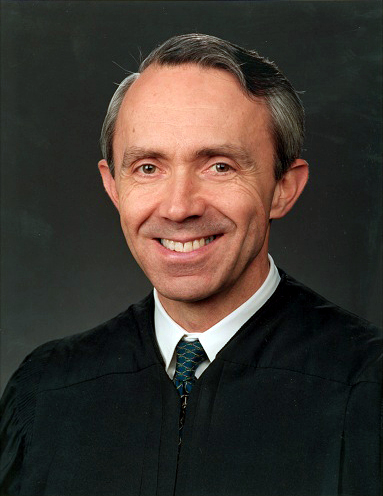
Justice Souter, the author of the majority opinion

Justice David Souter delivered the opinion of the court. Souter noted that any suit against the United States required a clear waiver of sovereign immunity and held that a waiver was granted by the Indian Tucker Act if there were statutory grounds in another federal statute or regulation. Souter then noted the difference between a "limited" or bare trust obligation, as was outlined in United States v. Mitchell I (Mitchell I), and those which could impose fiduciary duties and carry monetary damages, as outlined in United States v. Mitchell II (Mitchell II). In Mitchell I, the United States held the land in trust to prevent alienation and to exempt the land from state taxation, but the tribe occupied and controlled the property. In such cases, the government did not have a fiduciary duty. In Mitchell II, the United States also held the land in trust, but actively controlled the property through comprehensive timber management regulations. Here, the government did have a fiduciary duty to the tribe.

Souter stated that the 1960 act set up a trust in the same manner as Mitchell I and then went beyond that to allow the United States to use the land and buildings for a school and administrative purposes. This control was at least as great as that exercised over the timber in Mitchell II. Since the government had exclusive use and control of the property, it could "not allow it to fall into ruin on his watch."

The three defenses presented by the United States were deemed without merit. First, the concept that the 1960 act "carved out" the buildings used by the government goes against the plain language of the statute. Second, the fact that the statute does not explicitly state that the government is subject to monetary damages is also without merit. Souter noted that, were the court to accept that reasoning, it would require that the court to overturn Mitchell II, which it was not prepared to do. Instead, the court will continue to use a "fair inference" from the law to determine if damages are authorized. Finally, the United States argued that the only appropriate relief would be injunctive relief instead of damages. Souter stated that this was clearly wrong and merely postponed the cost to the government to repair the buildings.

The court affirmed the decision of the Circuit Court and remanded it to the Court of Federal Claims for actions consistent with the ruling. Souter was joined in the majority opinion by Justices Stevens, O'Connor, Ginsburg, and Breyer.

=== Concurrence ===
Justice Ruth Bader Ginsburg concurred in the opinion of the majority. Ginsburg expanded on the differences between the lack of liability under Mitchell I and the imposition of damages to compensate "for the harm caused by maladministration of the property." She stated that the opinion of the court was consent with other cases, such as Mitchell II and United States v. Navajo Nation, where the government has exercised control in a "manner irreconcilable with its caretaker obligations". Ginsburg stated that the government had clearly failed its caretaker duties. Ginsburg was joined by Justice Breyer in the concurrence.

=== Dissent ===
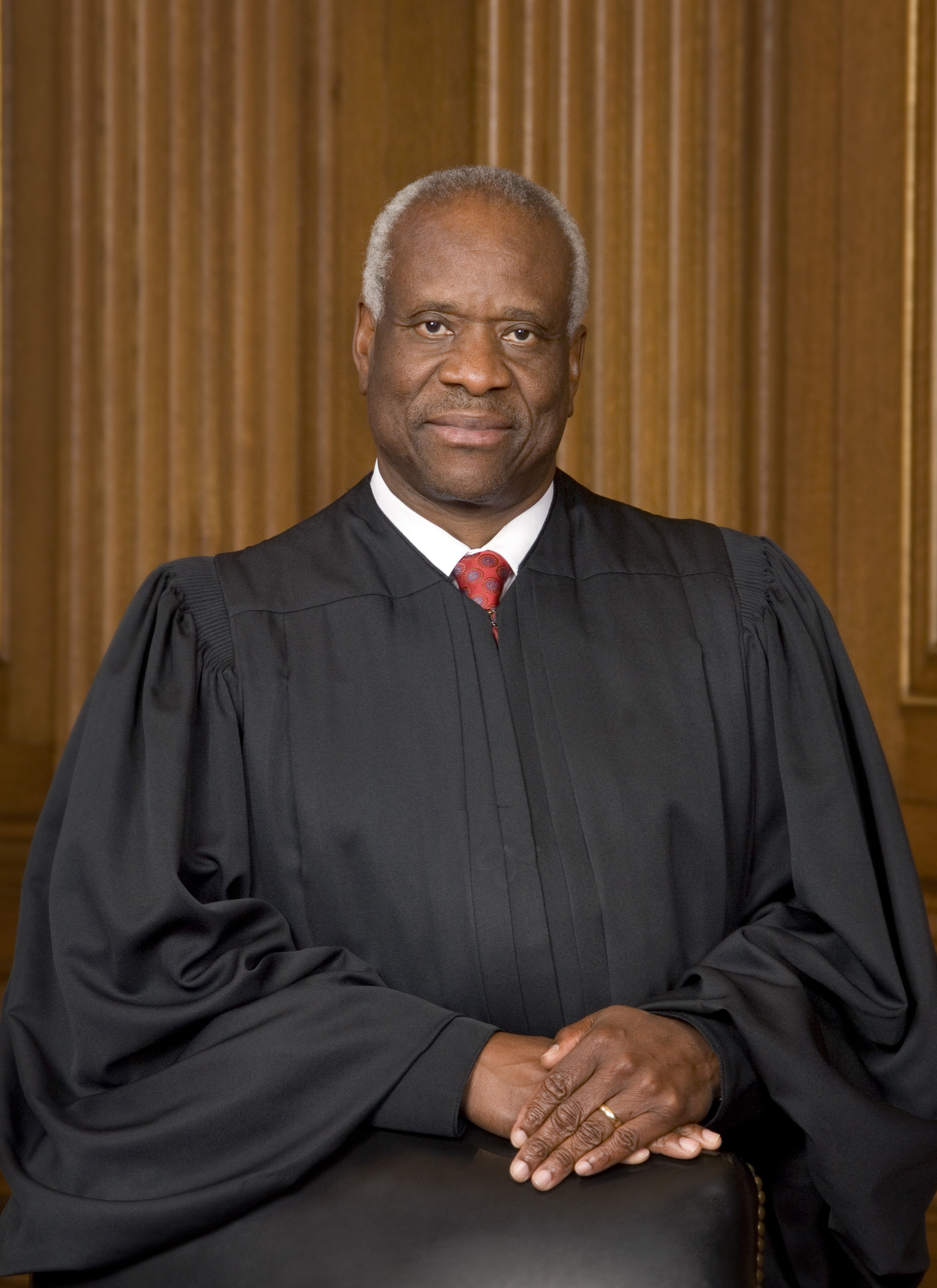
Justice Thomas, the author of the dissenting opinion

Justice Clarence Thomas dissented, joined by Chief Justice Rehnquist and Justices Scalia and Kennedy. Thomas stated that the test has always been if the statute in question could be "fairly interpreted" to allow monetary damages. He stated that the majority had devised a new test: whether liability could be allowed on a "fair inference" of congressional authorization. Thomas believed that Mitchell I was the proper case to compare with this one, as none of the detailed control and responsibilities present in Mitchell II were present in this case. He further said that without a clear and unambiguous intent by Congress to make the United States liable, there could be no finding of monetary damages.

== Subsequent developments ==
The loss in court prompted the federal government to settle with the tribe for approximately $12 million in 2005. In 2007, the government transferred 27 buildings to the tribe along with the $12 million, plus interest. They are managed by the Fort Apache Heritage Foundation, a nonprofit corporation chartered by the tribe. The case, together with Mitchell I, Mitchell II, and the Navajo Nation, define the state of the Indian Trust Doctrine. The United States has subsequently taken various actions to reduce the government's exposure to trust claims by tribes.

=== Law reviews and books ===
The case has been cited in numerous law reviews. Some of these were critical of the majority approach, stating that it went beyond the plain meaning of the text to open up the federal government to liability where none existed. Other reviews merely analyzed the decision and how it affected government-tribe trust cases. Alex Tallchief Skibine opined that the case was almost unique, and he did not foresee that it would be significant for other tribes.

As with law reviews, the case has been cited in numerous books, especially those dealing with federal litigation or Indian law. It has been cited extensively in regards to the trust relationship between BIA and the tribes, and has been used as an example of the fiduciary duty held by the government.
