= Thomas More Society =

Conservative anti-abortion American law firm based in Chicago

The Thomas More Society is a conservative Roman Catholic public-interest law firm based in Chicago. The group has been engaged in many "culture war" issues, promoting its anti-abortion and anti-same-sex marriage beliefs through litigation. The society filed cases as part of Donald Trump's failed attempt to overturn the results of the 2020 presidential election, in which Trump was defeated.

== History and ideology ==
Founded by Tom Brejcha in 1997, the group won two U.S. Supreme Court victories against the National Organization for Women in Scheidler v. National Organization for Women in 2003 and 2006. Brejcha is the president and chief counsel of the group. The Thomas More Society has been engaged in many "culture war" issues, promoting its anti-abortion and anti-same-sex marriage beliefs through litigation.

The Thomas More Society is one of a broader set of Christian conservative legal organizations (CCLOs), which include Alliance Defending Freedom, American Center for Law and Justice, First Liberty Institute, Freedom of Conscience Defense Fund, Liberty Counsel, National Legal Foundation, Christian Legal Society, and Becket Fund for Religious Liberty.

== Organization ==
The Thomas More Society received 501(c)(3) tax-exempt status in November 1999. On its 2022 Form 990, it reported revenue of $13.4 million and expenses of $16.3 million.

The society is listed on the United States Conference of Catholic Bishops' "Directory of Lay Movements, Organizations, and Professional Associations" as a National Catholic Association.

== Litigation ==
=== Reproduction issues ===
In partnership with the CatholicVote Legal Defense Fund, the Thomas More Society has challenged the constitutionality of the Affordable Care Act's mandate requiring companies' health insurance plans to cover contraceptives and sterilization.

In 2015, the Thomas More Society filed amicus briefs in the civil case of actress Sofia Vergara, who was sued by her ex-boyfriend in a frozen embryo case; the society, along with other anti-abortion groups, sought to have the courts treat the embryo as children (under a "best interests of the child" standard) rather than as marital property. The case tied into a broader "personhood" debate that had emerged in the politics of abortion.

In 2016, the Thomas More Society represented anti-abortion activist David Daleiden, of California, pro bono.

In 2018, the Executive Council of Iowa, which included Republican Governor Kim Reynolds, hired the Thomas More Society to defend Iowa in a legal challenge against Iowa's recently passed abortion law, the strictest in the nation. The group stepped in to represent the state after Iowa Attorney General Tom Miller, a Democrat, declined to defend the law's constitutionality. The group represented the state without a fee. A state court blocked the Iowa law from going into effect.

In 2023 the Thomas More Society joined in representing a Texas man in a suit against his ex-wife's associates. The plaintiff alleges they aided the ex-wife in obtaining the drugs for medical abortion. Asserting that assisting a self-managed abortion is murder, the suit was brought pursuant to wrongful death statutes rather than the Texas Heartbeat Act ("S.B. 8"), the anti-abortion vigilante act. Legal scholar Melissa Murray viewed the suit as an attempt to get the Texas courts to recognize fetal personhood. Lawyers for the plaintiff said the suit would add the manufacturer of the abortion drugs once it is identified.

In 2024, the firm attempted to remove Missouri Amendment 3 (a citizen-initiated ballot proposal to amend the state constitution to recognize a right to abortion) from the November 2024 ballot. Secretary of State Jay Ashcroft directed the referendum to be removed from the ballot, but the Missouri Supreme Court reversed this decision, ordering the amendment to remain on the ballot.

=== LGBT issues ===
In 2013, the Thomas More Society intervened on behalf of five Illinois county clerks who opposed same-sex marriage and sought to block its legalization in Illinois.

The group represented a former Missouri State University student who claimed that he was expelled from the university's master's degree in counseling program for refusing to counsel same-sex couples. The university settled in 2017 with the ex-student for $25,000.

In May 2022, aided by the Thomas More Society, a former Arconic employee Daniel Snyder filed a federal lawsuit against the company alleging religious discrimination. Snyder lost his job at Arconic's Riverdale plant in June 2021 after publicly posting on the company's intranet his objection to using a rainbow to promote Gay Pride Month. In August 2024, the U.S. Court of Appeals for the Eighth Circuit dismissed Snyder's appeal.

In Mirabelli v. Bonta, Thomas More Society represented two California teachers and a group of parents challenging school district and state policies that limited disclosure to parents about students' gender identity at school. In December 2025, U.S. District Judge Roger Benitez issued a class-wide permanent injunction against the policies. The U.S. Court of Appeals for the Ninth Circuit stayed the injunction in January 2026. On March 2, 2026, the U.S. Supreme Court, in a 6–3 per curiam ruling on its emergency docket, vacated the Ninth Circuit's stay, holding that the parents were likely to succeed on Free Exercise Clause and Due Process Clause claims.

=== Divorce ===
In 2020, the society filed an amicus brief in the Nebraska Supreme Court in the case of Dycus v. Dycus, urging the court to strike down Nebraska's no-fault divorce law. The court upheld the law.

=== Challenges to COVID-19 public health measures ===
During the COVID-19 pandemic, the Thomas More Society filed lawsuits on behalf of various parties to stop or weaken public health measures implemented to stop the spread of the virus. They contended that capacity limits, social distancing rules, face covering requirements, and vaccine mandates violates the religious liberties of churches and individuals. The group represented Grace Community Church, a Los Angeles County megachurch, in one case. It filed a similar lawsuit on behalf of a Wisconsin anti-abortion group which claimed that the COVID-19 restriction on public gatherings unlawfully blocked the group from gathering.

=== Failed efforts to overturn 2020 presidential election outcome ===
The Thomas More Society has been aligned with the presidential administration of Donald Trump. Trump appointed Sarah Pitlyk, a special counsel to the society, to a federal district judgeship.

In 2020, after Trump was defeated by Joe Biden in the 2020 presidential election, the Thomas More Society established the Amistad Project as part of an attempt to overturn the results of the 2020 presidential election. Trump repeatedly and falsely claimed that the election was marred by voter fraud. The project was led by former Kansas Attorney General (and later Liberty University professor) Phillip Kline, although his law license was suspended. The effort was tied to Jenna Ellis, a senior legal adviser to the Trump campaign who was also special counsel to the Thomas More Society. The Amistad Projects filed lawsuits on behalf of supposed "grassroots" groups (with titles such as the "Pennsylvania Voters Alliance" and "Wisconsin Voters Alliance") in the swing states won by Biden (Arizona, Georgia, Michigan, Pennsylvania, and Wisconsin). All the suits were rejected or dismissed by the courts. Ellis's tie to the society and the project suggested "a coordinated effort to flood the nation's courts with repetitive litigation" allowing Trump to continue to claim that the election results remain contested.

On December 14, 2020, ahead of the electoral college vote, Amistad Project attorney Ian Northon accompanied a group of self-described "Republican electors" in Lansing who were attempting to cast Michigan electoral votes for Trump, despite Biden winning Michigan and being previously certified as the winner. Northon claimed the "electors" were "fulfilling their constitutional duty." The fake "votes" cast by the pro-Trump "alternate electors" have no legal standing.

On December 22, 2020, after the electors had cast their votes, the Amistad Project sued in D.C. federal court on behalf of a variety of plaintiffs: ten voters, five organizations, and eight state legislators. The two Michigan legislators listed as plaintiffs later requested to be dropped from the suit, feeling that the suit that was filed differed too strongly from what they had agreed to. The project sued, among others, Vice President Mike Pence, governors, election officials, and legislative officials in the battleground states; the U.S. House of Representatives and U.S. Senate, and the electoral college itself. The group asked the court to (as the district court later described in denying the request) "declare unconstitutional several decades-old federal statutes governing the appointment of electors and the counting of electoral votes for President of the United States; to invalidate multiple state statutes regulating the certification of Presidential votes; to ignore certain Supreme Court decisions; and, the coup de grace, to enjoin the U.S. Congress from counting the electoral votes on January 6, 2021, and declaring Joseph R. Biden the next President." The suit was derided by legal community for the substance of its arguments, the broadness of its goals, and for naming the Electoral College as a defendant, with notes that the Electoral College is not something that exists, but a process that happens.

On January 4, 2021, U.S. District Judge James E. Boasberg denied the society's motion for a preliminary injunction, noting that plaintiffs lacked standing, the case was filed in the wrong court, and that plaintiffs made no effort to serve the other side. Boasberg wrote that in addition to those procedural problems, "the suit rests on a fundamental and obvious misreading of the Constitution. It would be risible were its target not so grave: the undermining of a democratic election for President of the United States."

Michael Gableman, the former justice of the Wisconsin Supreme Court who led a state-funded investigation into unfounded allegations of fraud in the 2020 presidential election in Wisconsin, was hired by the Thomas More Society after being fired by the politician who hired him, Speaker of the Wisconsin State Assembly Robin Vos, in August 2022.

=== Education ===
In July 2021, the law firm sued the San Diego Unified School District for changing the name and mascots at Junipero Serra High School because of Serra's association with the mission system and the cultural assimilation of Native Americans. The firm's press release blamed a "'cancel culture' mentality that radical leftist people in education are trying to force on an unwilling American public". The school was renamed to Canyon Hills High School after the firm's request for a temporary restraining order was denied.

In January 2022, the law firm reached a settlement agreement between its client Californians for Equal Rights and the California Department of Education to remove Aztec and Ashe prayers from its Ethnic Studies Model Curriculum.
