= National Organization for Women v. Scheidler =

- Supreme Court of the United States

Argued December 8, 1993 Decided January 24, 1994
- Full case name: National Organization for Women, Inc., et al. v. Joseph Scheidler, et al.
- Citations: 510 U.S. 249 (more) 114 S. Ct. 798, 127 L. Ed. 2d 99, 1994 U.S. LEXIS 1143

Case history
- Prior: Complaint dismissed, 765 F. Supp. 937 (N.D. Ill. 1991); affirmed, 968 F.2d 612 (7th Cir. 1992); rehearing denied, 7th Cir., Aug. 4, 1992; cert. granted, 508 U.S. 971 (1994).
- Subsequent: Rehearing denied, 510 U.S. 1215 (1994); remanded, 25 F.3d 1053 (7th Cir. 1994); complaint stricken in part, dismissed as to certain defendants; 897 F.Supp. 1047 (N.D. Ill. 1995); summary judgment granted in part to defendants, N.D. Ill. Sept. 23, 1997; permanent injunction granted to plaintiffs, N.D. Ill. July 19, 1999; affirmed, 267 F.3d 687 (7th Cir. 2001); rehearing denied, 7th Cir., Oct. 29, 2001; cert. granted, 535 U.S. 1016 (2002); reversed and remanded, Scheidler v. National Organization for Women, 537 U.S. 393 (2003); remanded, 91 F. App'x 510 (7th Cir. 2004); rehearing denied, 396 F.3d 807 (7th Cir. 2005); cert. granted, 545 U.S. 1151 (2005); reversed, Scheidler v. National Organization for Women, 547 U.S. 9 (2006).

Holding
- The Racketeer Influenced and Corrupt Organizations Act applies to enterprises without economic motives, including anti-abortion protesters. Seventh Circuit reversed.

Court membership
- Chief Justice William Rehnquist Associate Justices Harry Blackmun · John P. Stevens; Sandra Day O'Connor · Antonin Scalia; Anthony Kennedy · David Souter; Clarence Thomas · Ruth Bader Ginsburg

Case opinions
- Majority: Rehnquist, joined by unanimous
- Concurrence: Souter, joined by Kennedy

Laws applied
- 18 U.S.C. § 1961–1968 Racketeer Influenced and Corrupt Organizations Act (RICO)

National Organization for Women v. Scheidler, 510 U.S. 249 (1994), is a United States Supreme Court case in which the Court ruled that the Racketeer Influenced and Corrupt Organizations Act (RICO) could apply to enterprises without economic motives; anti-abortion protesters could thus be prosecuted under it. An organization without an economic motive can still affect interstate or foreign commerce and thus satisfy the Act's definition of a racketeering enterprise.

The Court did not issue judgment on whether or not the Pro-Life Action Network, the organization in question, had committed actions that could be prosecuted under RICO.

G. Robert Blakey argued on behalf of Joseph Scheidler, while Miguel Estrada represented the United States as amicus curiae in favor of reversal.

== See also ==
- List of class-action lawsuits
