= Burns Polk =

American politician

Burns Polk was a state legislator in Arkansas. He represented Lee County, Arkansas in the Arkansas House of Representatives in 1874 and 1875. He was African American.

His heirs received $300 from the federal government as a result of claims under the Bowman Act and Tucker Act.
