= United States v. Cook =

- Supreme Court of the United States

Decided May 4, 1874
- Full case name: United States v. George Cook
- Citations: 86 U.S. 591 (more) 19 Wall. 591; 22 L. Ed. 210

Case history
- Prior: Certificate of division, C.C.E.D. Wis.

Holding
- Indian tribes do not own the land their reservations are on, the land is owned by the United States and the Indians only have a right to occupy the land. They may not cut and sell timber merely for the purpose of selling timber, they may only sell timber that was cut incidental to another purpose. The government has a right to take action to recover damages for timber sold illegally from that land.

Court membership
- Chief Justice Morrison Waite Associate Justices Nathan Clifford · Noah H. Swayne; Samuel F. Miller · David Davis; Stephen J. Field · William Strong; Joseph P. Bradley · Ward Hunt

Case opinion
- Majority: Waite, joined by unanimous

Laws applied
- Common law decision, based on replevin, waste, and Indian right of occupancy
- Superseded by
- Statute, 25 U.S.C. §§ 406–407, as stated in United States v. Mitchell, 463 U.S. 206 (1983).

United States v. Cook, 86 U.S. (19 Wall.) 591 (1873), was a United States Supreme Court case in which the Court held that Indian tribes do not own the land their reservations are on, the land is owned by the United States and the Indians only have a right to occupy the land. They may not cut and sell timber merely for the purpose of selling timber, they may only sell timber that was cut incidental to another purpose. The government has a right to take action to recover damages for timber sold illegally from that land.

== Background ==
In 1831, the Menominee tribe turned over part of their reservation in Wisconsin to the United States for use by the Stockbridge Indians. Some of the tribe cut timber and sold the logs to George Cook. The federal government brought an action in common law known as a writ of replevin to recover the logs from Cook. It came to the Supreme Court on a certificate of division. The only side to present an argument was the United States, Cook was not represented before the Court.

== Opinion of the Court ==
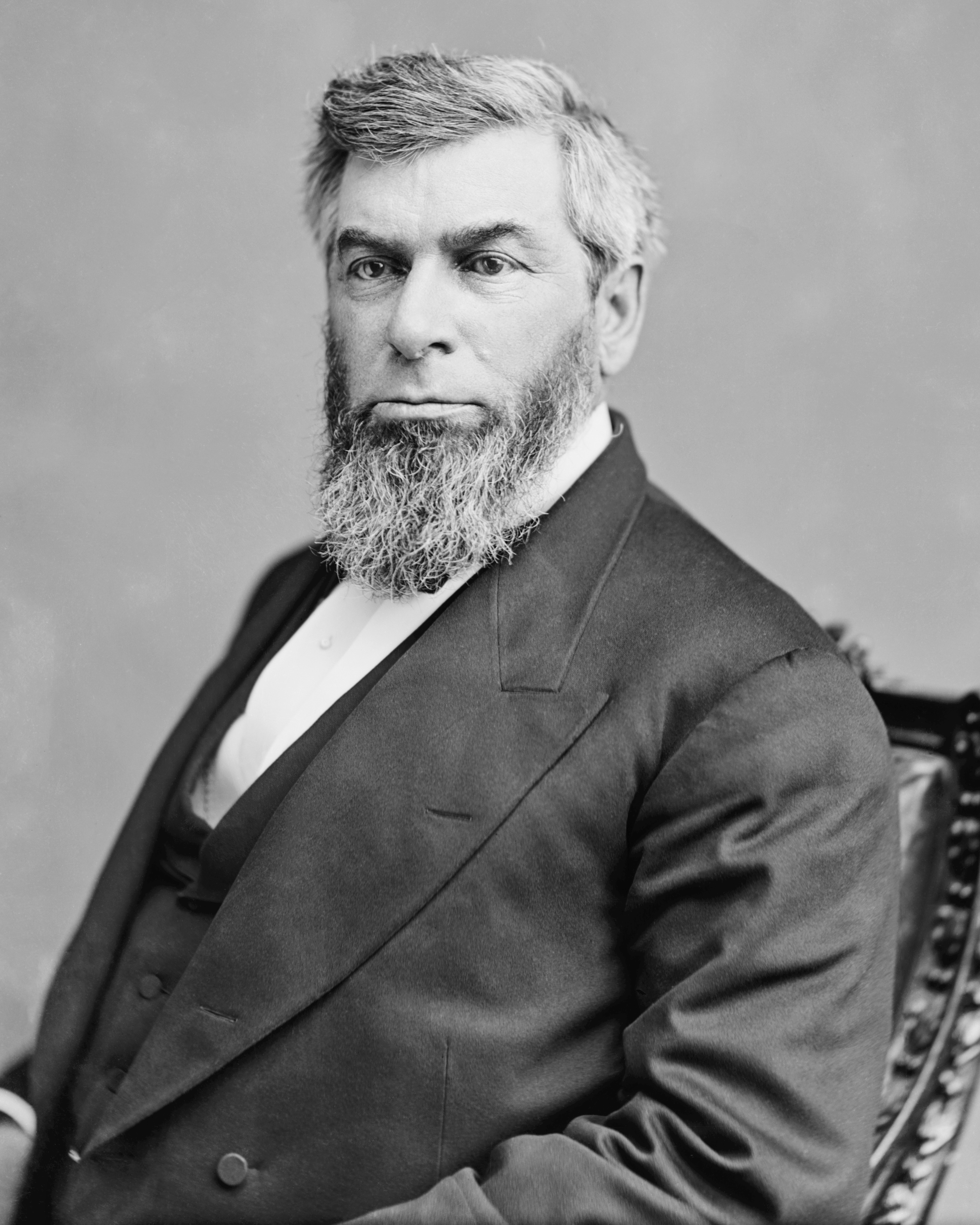
Author of the opinion, Chief Justice Morrison Waite

Chief Justice Morrison Waite delivered the opinion of the Court. Justice Waite stated that the title held by the Stockbridge tribe was one of occupancy only, that the United States held the fee title to the land. Justice Waite noted that this had been decided in Johnson v. McIntosh 50 years earlier, in 1823. The Indians were not allowed to cut and sell lumber under the legal principal of waste. If they were clearing land for agriculture, they could sell the lumber as an incidental byproduct of the improvement to the land. The sale must be incidental to the improvement, and if not, the federal government may take legal action to recover the lumber.

== Subsequent developments ==
This principle of waste and sale of material from reservation land was changed in 1920, when Congress passed a law authorizing the sale of timber for the benefit of the tribes.
