= How Sex Became a Civil Liberty =

2013 book by Leigh Ann Wheeler

- Cover
- Author: Leigh Ann Wheeler
- Language: English
- Subject: The sexual revolution, civil liberties in the United States, the history of the American Civil Liberties Union (ACLU)
- Publisher: Oxford University Press
- Publication date: 7 February 2013 (print); 16 March 2015 (online)
- ISBN: 9780199754236

How Sex Became a Civil Liberty is a 2013 book by American historian Leigh Ann Wheeler, published by Oxford University Press. The book is a study of how and why Americans began to think about sexuality in terms of rights and civil liberties. It explains the central role played by the American Civil Liberties Union (ACLU) in shaping the legal and cultural landscape regarding sexuality in the 20th-century United States.

== Summary ==
The book is a historical account of how the American Civil Liberties Union (ACLU) helped shape conversations and legal precedents around sexuality in the United States—from the early twentieth century onward. Wheeler explains how ACLU founders (and subsequent leaders) engaged with emerging debates over birth control, obscenity, nudism, sexual orientation, abortion, sterilization, rape, and sexual harassment, showing how they redefined "civil liberties" to include matters of sexual expression and behavior. The book covers the personal backgrounds of early ACLU activists in Greenwich Village during the 1910s and 1920s, and follows the organization's changing approach to defending sexual speech in the 1930s. The author shows how ACLU lawyers gradually broadened free-speech protections to cover commercial entertainment and sexual conduct. Wheeler showed how these legal battles were deeply entangled with cultural shifts. For example, the ACLU worked with nudists and advocates for rights to birth control and abortion to persuade legislatures, courts, and the broader public toward recognizing a constitutional right to privacy.

As the narrative moves into the mid-twentieth century, it explores the ACLU's interpretation of consumer rights as part of the First Amendment. Wheeler describes how courts and activists came to interpret freedom of speech as not only the right to create and disseminate speech about sexuality but also the right of individuals to access it. She then discusses how ACLU attorneys extended these principles of privacy and free expression into the realm of sexual conduct, especially in the 1960s and 1970s, when the organization took on cases concerning contraception, abortion, and, later, broader notions of reproductive liberty. Wheeler demonstrates that the ACLU navigated internal disagreements over how far it should go in defending various forms of sexual expression. The organization also responded to demands from homosexual rights activists, feminists seeking protection from harassment, and others who shaped modern understandings of civil liberties.

In the final chapter, Wheeler examines the ACLU's complex engagement with rape law reform and sexual harassment law from the 1970s through the 1990s. The organization faced internal divisions as it attempted to balance women's rights with traditional civil libertarian commitments to defendants' rights and free speech. While the ACLU participated in feminist efforts to reform rape laws and combat sexual harassment, its policies often prioritized due process for defendants and First Amendment protections over victims' rights. In this section the author analyzes key cases such as Robinson v. Jacksonville Shipyards (1991) and Harris v. Forklift Systems (1993), demonstrating how the ACLU introduced First Amendment concerns into sexual harassment adjudication. Wheeler argues that the ACLU's approach to these issues privileged access to sexual expression over protection from unwanted sexual expression, which reflects the organization's broader framework of sexual civil liberties that emphasized freedom over equality.

Wheeler argues that these legal and cultural changes were never fully settled but continued to stir debate over the proper balance between individual freedom and public regulation. In doing so, she presents the ACLU's role as a critical one in redefining sexuality as a matter of constitutional rights, including ensuring that freedom of speech and privacy became central to many of the nation's key legal disputes over sex.

== Reviews ==
Legal historian Laura Weinrib described the book as an illuminating, "accessible and elegantly written" study of how sexual expression and privacy entered America's civil liberties agenda. Weinrib emphasized how Wheeler deftly analyzed the ACLU's shifting stance on consumer rights, state regulation, and personal freedom, praising the book for resisting "the celebratory vein so prominent in previous scholarship."

Political scientist Karen L. Baird admired Wheeler's detailed history of how sex became a civil liberty, calling its breadth "remarkable." Recognizing that the personal stories Wheeler relates might seem less relevant in a political science class, they are crucial to understanding how the history of sexual civil liberties unfolded, bringing about crucial transformations in American attitudes and laws.

American feminist scholar Liam Lair praised Wheeler's provocative study of the ACLU. Lair highlighted how she traced the evolution of sexual civil liberties across the twentieth century. He also lauded her careful use of oral histories and archival sources, and how she showed how the ACLU drove debates about free speech and privacy.

Robin C. Henry emphasized the author's analysis of the role of the ACLU in the construction and constant renegotiation of the language of "sexual rights" and "sexual citizenship" as constitutionally protected speech. Henry admired Wheeler's focus on both biographical details and legal conflicts. She conveyed Wheeler's perspective on sexual civil liberties as the natural outcomes of sexual freedom and free speech.

Susan M. Hartmann noted that Wheeler's work could provide "fodder for Constitutional originalists," but considered it a "distinguished contribution to US twentieth-century history" and an essential "foundation for understanding the ongoing debates about sexual freedom and sexual equality." She commended the book for its "engaging style" and "impeccable organization." Hartmann drew attention to the fact that the ACLU addressed new issues over the years, especially after being joined by feminist members who questioned the organization tenets. Controversial disputes among the members was around determining what is the most important issue: the right to free expression or the right to be free of sexual harassment. Hartmann provided an impartial perspective on this issue. She outlined the benefits of the right to privacy, emphasizing that this right confers individuals' agency and control over their reproductive lives. On the other hand, a central feature of this review is the notion that the right to sexual expression has negative repercussions for women, as Hartmann highlighted that the right to sexual expression has become prevalent at the expense of consent because, quoting Wheeler, "It is primarily through the bodies of girls and women that this culture's sexual expression takes place".

In her review of the book, American historian Robyn L. Rosen criticised praises the book as "fascinating and meticulously researched" and "insightful and accessible," finding particular value in its explanation of the ACLU's shift from defending the "right to read" and constructing a right to privacy, but she questions Wheeler's treatment of rape and sexual harassment—"troubling and difficult" issues that Wheeler handles with "a degree of restraint that this reviewer" found alternately "admirable and troubling." Most concerning to her was Wheeler's categorization of rape and sexual harassment as forms of "sexual expression" that the ACLU treated differently due to issues related to race, even as it continued to privilege access to sexual expression over protection from it. Overall, however, she praised Wheeler's "lively" narrative for its balanced approach and transparency regarding the internal conflicts and contradictions besieging the organization. Rosen depicted the book as a complex and compelling navigation of the ethical implications that have come with advocacy of sexual civil liberties that—though ever evolving—continue to shape our current moment.

Law professor Dara E. Purvis noted how the book showed key figures and local affiliates gradually convincing national leaders to address gay rights. Purvis agreed with the author's explanation that early legal defeats still helped the ACLU evolve. She concluded that the book provided a historical lens for understanding how individuals reshaped the group's agenda on sexuality. Purvis suggested that the main achievement of the book is that it encapsulates how individuals "banded together under the auspices of the ACLU with many different ideas of how sex might or should be viewed as constitutionally protected".

In her review, Political Science Professor Leslie F. Goldstein calls it "a terrific book" that demonstrates the importance of historical contingency by showing how personal relationships and chance events influenced the group's changing legal strategies, whether through timely donations, accidental meetings of key figures, or economic shifts that altered public opinion. Goldstein praises the book "remarkably nuanced and balanced" account of became "a pioneer in putting sexual freedom into the US constitution."
