= Barnhart v. Peabody Coal Co. =

- Supreme Court of the United States

Argued October 8, 2002 Decided January 15, 2003
- Full case name: Jo Anne B. Barnhart, Commissioner of Social Security, Petitioner v. Peabody Coal Company, et al.; Jo Anne B. Barnhart, Commissioner of Social Security, Petitioner v. Bellaire Corporation, et al.; Michael H. Holland, et al., Petitioners v. Bellaire Corporation, et al.
- Citations: 537 U.S. 149 (more) 123 S. Ct. 748; 154 L. Ed. 2d 653; 2003 U.S. LEXIS 752; 71 U.S.L.W. 4041; 29 Employee Benefits Cas. (BNA) 2089; 2003 Cal. Daily Op. Service 419; 2003 Daily Journal DAR 501; 16 Fla. L. Weekly Fed. S 35

Case history
- Prior: On writs of certiorari to the United States Court of Appeals for the Sixth Circuit. Peabody Coal Co. v. Massanari, 14 F. App'x 393, 2001 U.S. App. LEXIS 14471 (2001). Bellaire Corp. v. Massanari, 14 Fed. Appx. 424, 2001 U.S. App. LEXIS 14784 (2001)

Court membership
- Chief Justice William Rehnquist Associate Justices John P. Stevens · Sandra Day O'Connor; Antonin Scalia · Anthony Kennedy; David Souter · Clarence Thomas; Ruth Bader Ginsburg · Stephen Breyer

Case opinions
- Majority: Souter, joined by Rehnquist, Stevens, Kennedy, Ginsburg, Breyer
- Dissent: Scalia, joined by O'Connor, Thomas
- Dissent: Thomas

Laws applied
- The Coal Industry Retiree Health Benefit Act of 1992 (26 U.S.C. § 9706(a))

Barnhart v. Peabody Coal Co., 537 U.S. 149 (2003), was a Supreme Court of the United States case. The case was to determine if a law instructing a government agent "shall" perform an action by a given date was intended as a 'spur to action' or a limit on whether the agent could act after the date. In this case the court held the agent could still act even after the date.

== Background ==
The Coal Industry Retiree Health Benefit Act of 1992 stated that "The Commissioner of Social Security shall, before October 1, 1993, assign each coal industry retiree eligible for benefits under the Act to an extant operating company responsible for funding the beneficiary's benefits." The assignment to an operator, like Peabody Coal, binds the operator to pay an annual premium to the United Mine Workers of America Combined Benefit Fund, which administers the benefits.

== Legal question ==
The question before the court was whether or not eligible retirees could be assigned to an operator after the October 1st date specified in the Act. If the retirees could not be assigned to an operator, the company they would have been assigned to would be free of obligation. The mining companies argued the date in the Act limited the commissioner's ability to assign eligible retirees to an operator. The commissioner argued the Act had been set to spur timely completion and that assignments could be made after that date.

== Court's decision ==
The court held for the commissioner. Citing precedent, the court ruled that the assignments could be made after the date and interpreted that "Congress had intended the work to be done by that date not that it could not be done after that date".

== See also ==
- List of United States Supreme Court cases, volume 537
- List of United States Supreme Court cases
- United States v. Navajo Nation (2009): also involved Peabody Coal Co.
