= Scheidler v. National Organization for Women (2003) =

- Supreme Court of the United States

Argued December 4, 2002 Decided February 26, 2003
- Full case name: Scheidler v. National Organization for Women
- Citations: 537 U.S. 393 (more) 123 S. Ct. 1057, 154 L. Ed. 2d 991, 2003 U.S. LEXIS 1738

Case history
- Prior: National Organization for Women, Inc. v. Scheidler, 510 U.S. 249 (1994); jury verdict and permanent injunction affirmed, 267 F.3d 687 (7th Cir. 2001), cert. granted, 535 U.S. 1016 (2002).
- Subsequent: Remanded, 91 F. App'x 510 (7th Cir. 2004); rehearing en banc denied, 396 F.3d 807 (7th Cir. 2005); cert. granted, 545 U.S. 1151 (2005); reversed, Scheidler v. National Organization for Women, 547 U.S. 9 (2006).

Court membership
- Chief Justice William Rehnquist Associate Justices John P. Stevens · Sandra Day O'Connor; Antonin Scalia · Anthony Kennedy; David Souter · Clarence Thomas; Ruth Bader Ginsburg · Stephen Breyer

Case opinions
- Majority: Rehnquist, joined by O'Connor, Scalia, Kennedy, Souter, Thomas, Ginsburg, Breyer
- Concurrence: Ginsburg, joined by Breyer
- Dissent: Stevens

Scheidler v. National Organization for Women, 537 U.S. 393 (2003), is a United States Supreme Court case involving whether abortion providers could receive damages from protesters under the Racketeer Influenced and Corrupt Organizations Act. National Organization for Women (NOW) obtained class status for women seeking the use of women's health clinics and began its court battle against Joseph Scheidler and PLAN et al. in 1986. In this particular case, the court's opinion was that extortion did not apply to the defendants' actions because they did not obtain any property from the respondents (NOW and the class of women).

== Legal history ==
=== RICO Act ===
The Racketeer Influenced and Corrupt Organizations Act was cited by NOW as an attempt to stop PLAN and Scheidler from protesting. NOW claimed that PLAN's actions constituted extortion because they were attempting to shut down abortion clinics, depriving the staff and the patients of their rights.

=== FACE Act of 1994 ===
FACE stands for Freedom of Access to Clinic Entrances, and protects the rights of patients trying to enter abortion clinics. This was important because this law had not yet passed when the first case National Organization for Women, Inc. v. Scheidler in Scheidler V. NOW was decided.

== Procedural history ==
In 1980, Joseph Scheidler began the Pro-Life Action League, a non-profit advocacy organization dedicated to ending abortion. As the abortion debate grew increasingly contentious, extreme anti-abortion activists began using violence to disrupt women’s health clinics across the country. In 1986, NOW filed a complaint with the Federal court citing antitrust laws. Then, in 1989, NOW expanded its suit, adding charges of extortion and RICO violations. In 1991, a trial judge dismissed the suit stating that because no economic gains were realized by Joseph Scheidler or PLAN, extortion did not apply. This was over-turned by the Supreme court in 1993. On April 20, 1998 Scheidler, PLAN et al. were declared racketeers under RICO by a jury and triple damages were awarded to NOW as a result of this ruling. In 2001, Court of Appeals for the Seventh Circuit upheld this ruling. It was brought before the Supreme court (again) in 2002. Arguments began December 4, 2002.

== Arguments ==
The chief argument for NOW was that the “property at issue is a business’s intangible right to exercise exclusive control over the use of its assets, (a) defendant obtains that property by obtaining control over the use of those assets.” The chief argument for Scheidler was “to conclude that such actions constituted extortion would effectively discard the statutory requirement that property must be obtained from another.”

== The Court's decision ==
The decision was delivered by Justice Rehnquist. The court held that “Petitioners did not commit extortion within the Hobbs Act’s meaning because they did not ‘obtain’ property from respondents. “if the distinction between extortion and coercion, which we find controls these cases, is to be abandoned, such a significant expansion of the law’s coverage must come from Congress, and not from the courts.”

=== Ginsburg's Concurrence ===
The Justices expressed concern over the interpretation of RICO and maintained that with the passage of the FACE act, Congress recognized that RICO wouldn't apply to a clinic in this way.

"RICO, which empowers both prosecutors and private enforcers, imposes severe criminal penalties and hefty civil liability on those engaged in conduct within the Act's compass. It has already "evolv[ed] into something quite different from the original conception of its enactors," warranting "concern[s] over the consequences of an unbridled reading of the statute,". The Court is rightly reluctant, as I see it, to extend RICO's domain further by endorsing the expansive definition of "extortion" adopted by the Seventh Circuit."

The court also noted that with the passage of the FACE act, Congress stipulated that RICO did not apply to cases such as this.

=== Dissenting opinion ===
Justice Stevens notes that RICO has been applied in this manner for quite some time by multiple courts. "For decades federal judges have uniformly given the term "property" an expansive construction that encompasses the intangible right to exercise exclusive control over the lawful use of business assets. The right to serve customers or to solicit new business is thus a protected property right. The use of violence or threats of violence to persuade the owner of a business to surrender control of such an intangible right is an appropriation of control embraced by the term "obtaining." Recognizing this settled definition of property, as I believe one must, the conclusion that petitioners obtained this property from respondents is amply supported by the evidence in the record."

He also pointedly adds that withdrawing RICO claims will decrease the severity of the crimes, possibly encouraging more such crimes to be committed.

"Third, given the fact that Congress has enacted specific legislation responsive to the concerns that gave rise to these cases, the principal beneficiaries of the Court's dramatic retreat from the position that federal prosecutors and federal courts have maintained throughout the history of this important statute will certainly be the class of professional criminals whose conduct persuaded Congress that the public needed federal protection from extortion."

== Influence ==
This case had the possibility to influence the interpretation of many laws. The first amendment was cited by Scheidler in his defense. Scheidler’s lawyers contested that he and PLAN had the right to assemble and make speeches within the public areas around the clinics. This also had bearing on other actions such as union strikes and even peaceful protests such as the civil rights struggles in the 1950s.

== See also ==
- National Organization for Women, Inc. v. Scheidler, 510 U.S. 249 (1994)
- Scheidler v. National Organization for Women, 547 U.S. 9 (2006)
- List of class-action lawsuits
