= Scheidler v. National Organization for Women (2006) =

Scheidler v. National Organization for Women, Inc.
- Supreme Court of the United States

Argued November 30, 2005 Decided February 28, 2006
- Full case name: Joseph Scheidler, et al. v. National Organization for Women, Inc., et al.
- Citations: 547 U.S. 9 (more) 126 S. Ct. 1264; 164 L. Ed. 2d 10; 2006 U.S. LEXIS 2022; 74 U.S.L.W. 4149; 19 Fla. L. Weekly Fed. S 120

Case history
- Prior: Complaint dismissed, 765 F. Supp. 937 (N.D. Ill. 1991); affirmed, 968 F.2d 612 (7th Cir. 1992); rehearing denied, 7th Cir., Aug. 4, 1992; cert. granted, 508 U.S. 971 (1994); reversed, National Organization for Women, Inc. v. Scheidler, 510 U.S. 249 (1994); rehearing denied, 510 U.S. 1215 (1994); remanded, 25 F.3d 1053 (7th Cir. 1994); complaint stricken in part, dismissed as to certain defendants; 897 F.Supp. 1047 (N.D. Ill. 1995); summary judgment granted in part to defendants, N.D. Ill. Sept. 23, 1997; permanent injunction granted to plaintiffs, N.D. Ill. July 19, 1999; affirmed, 267 F.3d 687 (7th Cir. 2001); rehearing denied, 7th Cir., Oct. 29, 2001; cert. granted, 535 U.S. 1016 (2002); reversed and remanded, Scheidler v. National Organization for Women, 537 U.S. 393 (2003); remanded, 91 Fed. Appx. 510 (7th Cir. 2004); rehearing denied, 396 F.3d 807 (7th Cir. 2005); cert. granted, 545 U.S. 1151 (2005).

Holding
- The Hobbs Act does not apply to the use of violence to block access to abortion clinics, because physical violence unrelated to robbery or extortion falls outside the act's scope.

Court membership
- Chief Justice John Roberts Associate Justices John P. Stevens · Antonin Scalia; Anthony Kennedy · David Souter; Clarence Thomas · Ruth Bader Ginsburg; Stephen Breyer · Samuel Alito

Case opinion
- Majority: Breyer, joined by Roberts, Stevens, Scalia, Kennedy, Souter, Thomas, Ginsburg
- Alito took no part in the consideration or decision of the case.

Laws applied
- 18 U.S.C. § 1951 (Hobbs Act)

Scheidler v. National Organization for Women, 547 U.S. 9 (2006), was a lengthy and high-profile U.S. legal case interpreting and applying the federal Racketeer Influenced and Corrupt Organizations Act (RICO): a law originally drafted to combat the mafia and organized crime, the Hobbs Act: an anti-extortion law prohibiting interference with commerce by violence or threat of violence, and the Travel Act: a law prohibiting interstate travel in support of racketeering.

== Parties and issues ==
The National Organization for Women ("NOW") as plaintiff filed the suit as a civil class-action in 1986 in federal district court on behalf of women seeking abortions and on behalf of various abortion clinics and providers. Plaintiffs sought monetary damages and injunctions under the RICO, Hobbs, and the Travel Acts, alleging that the defendants against whom the suit was filed are racketeering organizations engaging in a conspiracy to prevent access to health care facilities providing abortion services. The suit's named defendants were Joseph Scheidler and other anti-abortion protesters and organizations who were members of the Pro-Life Action League (PLAL), and specifically the Oklahoma Pro-Life Action Network (PLAN). The underlying issues in the case concerning access to abortion and the coercive and violent tactics used by some to prevent such access formed a central rallying point for both sides of the national abortion debate.

== Consolidation and rulings ==
The Circuit and Supreme courts heard appeals and the matter was eventually consolidated with National Organization for Women et al. v. Operation Rescue. The case was argued before the Supreme Court of the United States on three separate occasions. A 2003 ruling that non-economic violence does not violate the RICO Act left other federal charges intact, including associated monetary damages and a national injunction against interference with abortion clinic operations, but the entire matter remained unsettled until the final decision in 2006 when the Supreme Court issued a unanimous decision in favor of Scheidler and PLAN (see below).

The case was also notable for the legal skills at the disposal of and displayed by the National Organization for Women.

== History ==
The suit against Scheidler and PLAN members was filed by NOW and supporting clinics in 1986, under the Sherman Antitrust Act and violations of various state laws. In 1988, it was expanded to include Randall Terry and Operation Rescue. In 1989, RICO and extortion claims were added.

=== Antitrust litigation ===
The United States District Court for the Northern District of Illinois dismissed the antitrust claims on the grounds that the protest groups were not in economic competition with the abortion clinics, and dismissed the RICO claims on the grounds that no "economic motive" was alleged. The dismissals were upheld by the Seventh Circuit Court of Appeals. This decision conflicted with other RICO cases from other circuits.

In 1994, the Supreme Court reversed the appeals court, asserting that no economic motive was necessary to violate the RICO laws.

The case was remanded back to the district court.

=== RICO complaint and trial ===
At this point, the defendants included John Patrick Ryan, Randall Terry, Andrew Scholberg, Conrad Wojnar, Timothy Murphy, Monica Migliorino, VitalMed Laboratories, Inc., the Pro-Life Action League, Inc. (PLAL), the Pro-Life Direct Action League, Inc. (PDAL), Operation Rescue, and Project Life. The plaintiffs included NOW and two abortion clinics, the Delaware Women's Health Organization, Inc., and the Summit Women's Health Organization, Inc.

Meanwhile, in 1994, the Freedom of Access to Clinic Entrances Act (FACE) went into effect, prohibiting the use of force or intimidation to block access to reproductive health care facilities.

In 1997, class-action status was granted by the district court, certifying NOW as representing the class of all women seeking reproductive health care. In 1998, Randall Terry, founder of Operation Rescue who was facing over $100,000 in costs from other abortion clinic-related charges, settled the case against him, agreeing to a permanent personal injunction.

Also 1998, as the Supreme Court summarizes:

After a 7-week trial, a six-member jury concluded that petitioners violated the civil provisions of RICO. By answering a series of special interrogatory questions, the jury found, inter alia, that petitioners' alleged "pattern of racketeering activity" included 21 violations of the Hobbs Act, 18 U. S. C. §1951; 25 violations of state extortion law; 25 instances of attempting or conspiring to commit either federal or state extortion; 23 violations of the Travel Act, 18 U. S. C. §1952; and 23 instances of attempting to violate the Travel Act. The jury awarded $31,455.64 to respondent, the National Women's Health Organization of Delaware, Inc., and $54,471.28 to the National Women's Health Organization of Summit, Inc. These damages were trebled pursuant to §1964(c). Additionally, the District Court entered a permanent nationwide injunction prohibiting petitioners from obstructing access to the clinics, trespassing on clinic property, damaging clinic property, or using violence or threats of violence against the clinics, their employees, or their patients.

(The injunction was issued in 1999; "petitioners" refers to the original defendants, who were the parties making the appeal.) The case was appealed to the Seventh Circuit again, on several grounds, including the First Amendment right to free speech. The circuit court affirmed the lower court's decision.

The Supreme Court agreed to hear an appeal, though refused to consider free speech issues. In its 2003 decision, the court ruled that while the actions under consideration in the appeal might have been coercive, they were not extortive because the defendants did not "'obtain' property" from their victims. The defendants did, however, according to the Court, interfere with the victims' ability to exercise their property rights. Coercion is a less serious crime than extortion, and is not covered by RICO. The decision left open the question of whether the law generally entitled private parties to injunctive relief (as opposed to after-the-fact monetary damages) in RICO cases.

=== Supreme Court review ===
The case returned to the Seventh Circuit, where the plaintiffs argued that while 117 violations of the RICO Act were addressed by the second Supreme Court decision, 4 violations of the Hobbs Act remained, constituting violence but not extortion. They also claimed that the national injunction could be supported as remedy for these acts. The appeals court attempted to remand these issues to the district court, but the defendants appealed to the Supreme Court, on the grounds that the Seventh Circuit was ignoring the 2003 decision. The defendants also asked the court to decide whether the Hobbs Act prohibits non-extortive violence, and to decide the still-open question of whether the law generally entitled private parties to injunctive relief in RICO cases.

With the case styled as Scheidler v. National Organization for Women, Inc., the Supreme Court handed down a unanimous (8-0) decision in favor of Scheidler and PLAN on February 28, 2006. Because he was not yet on the Court when the arguments were presented, Justice Samuel Alito did not participate in the decision. The Court held that the Hobbs Act did not cover violence unrelated to robbery or extortion. The Court also noted that Congress's 1994 passage of FACE indicated that Congress did not view RICO as pertaining to this area.

== See also ==
- List of class action lawsuits
- List of United States Supreme Court cases, volume 547
- List of United States Supreme Court cases
