= United States v. Navajo Nation (2003) =

- Supreme Court of the United States

Argued December 2, 2002 Decided March 4, 2003
- Full case name: United States v. Navajo Nation
- Docket no.: 01-1375

Holding
- The Indian Mineral Leasing Act of 1938 (IMLA) does not require the Secretary to manage the tribe's resources for the tribe's benefit.

Court membership
- Chief Justice William Rehnquist Associate Justices John P. Stevens · Sandra Day O'Connor; Antonin Scalia · Anthony Kennedy; David Souter · Clarence Thomas; Ruth Bader Ginsburg · Stephen Breyer

Case opinions
- Majority: Ginsburg, joined by Rehnquist, Scalia, Kennedy, Thomas, Breyer
- Dissent: Souter, joined by Stevens, O'Connor

United States v. Navajo Nation, 537 U.S. 488 (2003) was a United States Supreme Court case in which the Navajo Nation initiated proceedings alleging that the Secretary of the Interior had breached their fiduciary duty to the Tribe by not acting in the Tribe's best interests.

== Conclusion ==
Citing Mitchell II the court found that "The IMLA and its implementing regulations impose no obligations resembling the detailed fiduciary responsibilities that Mitchell II found adequate to support a claim for money damages", reversing the judgment of the United States Court of Appeals and remanding the case.

== See also ==
- United States v. Navajo Nation (2009)
- List of United States Supreme Court cases
