= Albright v. Oliver =

- Supreme Court of the United States

Decided January 24, 1994
- Full case name: Albright v. Oliver
- Citations: 510 U.S. 266 (more)

Holding
- There is no substantive due process violation that creates liability under Section 1983 when the police arrests someone for conduct that is not unlawful.

Court membership
- Chief Justice William Rehnquist Associate Justices Harry Blackmun · John P. Stevens; Sandra Day O'Connor · Antonin Scalia; Anthony Kennedy · David Souter; Clarence Thomas · Ruth Bader Ginsburg

Case opinions
- Plurality: Rehnquist, joined by O'Connor, Scalia, Ginsburg
- Concurrence: Scalia
- Concurrence: Ginsburg
- Concurrence: Kennedy, joined by Thomas
- Concurrence: Souter
- Dissent: Stevens, joined by Blackmun

Laws applied
- 14 U.S.C. 1983

Albright v. Oliver, 510 U.S. 266 (1994), was a United States Supreme Court case in which the Court held that there is no substantive due process violation that creates liability under Section 1983 when the police arrests someone for conduct that is not unlawful. It was a plurality decision.
