= Florence County School District Four v. Carter =

- Supreme Court of the United States

Argued October 6, 1993 Decided November 9, 1993
- Full case name: Florence County School District Four et al. v. Carter, a Minor, By and Through Her Father and Next Friend, Carter
- Docket no.: 91–1523
- Citations: 510 U.S. 7 (more) 114 S. Ct. 361; 126 L. Ed. 2d 284
- Argument: Oral argument

Case history
- Prior: 950 F.2d 156 (4th Cir. 1991); cert. granted, 507 U.S. 907 (1993).

Court membership
- Chief Justice William Rehnquist Associate Justices Harry Blackmun · John P. Stevens; Sandra Day O'Connor · Antonin Scalia; Anthony Kennedy · David Souter; Clarence Thomas · Ruth Bader Ginsburg

Case opinion
- Majority: O'Connor, joined by unanimous

Laws applied
- Individuals with Disabilities Education Act

Florence County School District Four v. Carter, 510 U.S. 7 (1993), was a case in which the Supreme Court of the United States held that, in certain circumstances, a court may order that parents be reimbursed for unilaterally withdrawing disabled children from schools that do not comply with the Individuals with Disabilities Education Act.

== Background ==
Parents of a learning-disabled child alleged that the child's public school did not provide appropriate resources, and the parents sought reimbursement for costs they incurred for placing their child in a private school. The United States District Court for the District of South Carolina found that the public school's proposed individual education plan violated the Individuals with Disabilities Education Act and that placement with private school was appropriate, and ordered reimbursement. The United States Court of Appeals for the Fourth Circuit affirmed, and United States Supreme Court granted certiorari to resolve a circuit split regarding reimbursement under the Individuals with Disabilities Education Act.

== Opinion of the Court ==
In a unanimous opinion written by Justice Sandra Day O'Connor, the Court held that the parents were entitled to reimbursement. Justice O'Connor wrote that the Individuals with Disabilities Education Act requires States to provide disabled children with a "free appropriate public education". In cases where children are unable to receive an appropriate education in public schools, reimbursement may be available for when parents unilaterally place their children in private schools. The Court also held that reimbursement is not barred because private school chosen by the parents did not meet IDEA's definition of free appropriate public education; reimbursement is not barred because private school is not on state's approved list of private schools; and courts may consider relevant factors in fashioning discretionary equitable relief, and total reimbursement is not appropriate if a court determines that cost of private education is unreasonable.

== See also ==
- List of United States Supreme Court cases, volume 510
- List of United States Supreme Court cases
- Lists of United States Supreme Court cases by volume
- List of United States Supreme Court cases by the Rehnquist Court
