= List of United States Supreme Court cases, volume 86 =

Supreme Court of the United States
- Interactive map of Supreme Court of the United States
- 38°53′26″N 77°00′16″W
- Established: March 4, 1789; 236 years ago
- Location: Washington, D.C.
- Coordinates: 38°53′26″N 77°00′16″W
- Composition method: Presidential nomination with Senate confirmation
- Authorised by: Constitution of the United States, Art. III, § 1
- Judge term length: life tenure, subject to impeachment and removal
- Number of positions: 9 (by statute)
- Website: supremecourt.gov

This is a list of cases reported in volume 86 (19 Wall.) of United States Reports, decided by the Supreme Court of the United States in 1873 and 1874.

== Nominative reports ==
In 1874, the U.S. government created the United States Reports, and retroactively numbered older privately published case reports as part of the new series. As a result, cases appearing in volumes 1–90 of U.S. Reports have dual citation forms; one for the volume number of U.S. Reports, and one for the volume number of the reports named for the relevant reporter of decisions (these are called "nominative reports").

=== John William Wallace ===
Starting with the 66th volume of U.S. Reports, the Reporter of Decisions of the Supreme Court of the United States was John William Wallace. Wallace was Reporter of Decisions from 1863 to 1874, covering volumes 68 through 90 of United States Reports which correspond to volumes 1 through 23 of his Wallace's Reports. As such, the dual form of citation to, for example, Coit v. Robinson is 86 U.S. (19 Wall.) 274 (1874).

Wallace's Reports were the final nominative reports for the US Supreme Court; starting with volume 91, cases were identified simply as "(volume #) U.S. (page #) (year)".

== Justices of the Supreme Court at the time of 86 U.S. (19 Wall.) ==
The Supreme Court is established by Article III, Section 1 of the Constitution of the United States, which says: "The judicial Power of the United States, shall be vested in one supreme Court . . .". The size of the Court is not specified; the Constitution leaves it to Congress to set the number of justices. Under the Judiciary Act of 1789 Congress originally fixed the number of justices at six (one chief justice and five associate justices). Since 1789 Congress has varied the size of the Court from six to seven, nine, ten, and back to nine justices (always including one chief justice).

When the cases in 86 U.S. (19 Wall.) were decided the Court comprised the following nine members:

Portrait	Justice	Office	Home State	Succeeded	Date confirmed by the Senate (Vote)	Tenure on Supreme Court
	Morrison Waite	Chief Justice	Ohio	Salmon P. Chase	January 21, 1874 (63–0)	March 4, 1874 – March 23, 1888 (Died)
	Nathan Clifford	Associate Justice	Maine	Benjamin Robbins Curtis	January 12, 1858 (26–23)	January 21, 1858 – July 25, 1881 (Died)
	Noah Haynes Swayne	Associate Justice	Ohio	John McLean	January 24, 1862 (38–1)	January 27, 1862 – January 24, 1881 (Retired)
	Samuel Freeman Miller	Associate Justice	Iowa	Peter Vivian Daniel	July 16, 1862 (Acclamation)	July 21, 1862 – October 13, 1890 (Died)
	David Davis	Associate Justice	Illinois	John Archibald Campbell	December 8, 1862 (Acclamation)	December 10, 1862 – March 4, 1877 (Resigned)
	Stephen Johnson Field	Associate Justice	California	newly created seat	March 10, 1863 (Acclamation)	May 10, 1863 – December 1, 1897 (Retired)
	William Strong	Associate Justice	Pennsylvania	Robert Cooper Grier	February 18, 1870 (No vote recorded)	March 14, 1870 – December 14, 1880 (Retired)
	Joseph P. Bradley	Associate Justice	New Jersey	newly created seat	March 21, 1870 (46–9)	March 23, 1870 – January 22, 1892 (Died)
	Ward Hunt	Associate Justice	New York	Samuel Nelson	December 11, 1872 (Acclamation)	January 9, 1873 – January 27, 1882 (Retired)

== Citation style ==
Under the Judiciary Act of 1789 the federal court structure at the time comprised District Courts, which had general trial jurisdiction; Circuit Courts, which had mixed trial and appellate (from the US District Courts) jurisdiction; and the United States Supreme Court, which had appellate jurisdiction over the federal District and Circuit courts—and for certain issues over state courts. The Supreme Court also had limited original jurisdiction (i.e., in which cases could be filed directly with the Supreme Court without first having been heard by a lower federal or state court). There were one or more federal District Courts and/or Circuit Courts in each state, territory, or other geographical region.

Bluebook citation style is used for case names, citations, and jurisdictions.

- "C.C.D." = United States Circuit Court for the District of . . .
  - e.g.,"C.C.D.N.J." = United States Circuit Court for the District of New Jersey
- "D." = United States District Court for the District of . . .
  - e.g.,"D. Mass." = United States District Court for the District of Massachusetts
- "E." = Eastern; "M." = Middle; "N." = Northern; "S." = Southern; "W." = Western
  - e.g.,"C.C.S.D.N.Y." = United States Circuit Court for the Southern District of New York
  - e.g.,"M.D. Ala." = United States District Court for the Middle District of Alabama
- "Ct. Cl." = United States Court of Claims
- The abbreviation of a state's name alone indicates the highest appellate court in that state's judiciary at the time.
  - e.g.,"Pa." = Supreme Court of Pennsylvania
  - e.g.,"Me." = Supreme Judicial Court of Maine

== List of cases in 86 U.S. (19 Wall.) ==
Case Name	Page and year	Opinion of the Court	Concurring opinion(s)	Dissenting opinion(s)	Lower Court	Disposition
Barings v. Dabney	1 (1874)	Bradley	Strong	none	S.C.	affirmed
Hodges v. Vaughan	12 (1873)	Clifford	none	none	original	certiorari denied
Stowe v. United States	13 (1874)	Davis	none	none	Ct. Cl.	affirmed
Salomon v. United States	17 (1873)	Miller	none	none	Ct. Cl.	reversed
McCarthy v. Mann	20 (1874)	Swayne	none	none	C.C.D. Minn.	affirmed
Zantzingers v. Gunton	32 (1874)	Miller	none	none	Sup. Ct. D.C.	affirmed
Bulkley v. United States	37 (1874)	Swayne	none	none	Ct. Cl.	reversed
The Wenona	41 (1874)	Clifford	none	none	C.C.N.D.N.Y.	reversed
Knowles v. Gaslight and Coke Company	58 (1874)	Bradley	none	none	C.C.D. Minn.	reversed
Baltimore and Potomac Railroad Company v. Sixth Presbyterian Church	62 (1874)	Miller	none	none	Sup. Ct. D.C.	dismissal denied
Cooper's Executor v. Omohundro	65 (1874)	Clifford	none	none	C.C.E.D. Va.	affirmed
Crews v. Brewer	70 (1874)	per curiam	none	none	C.C.N.D. Ill.	affirmed
The Lucille	73 (1874)	Miller	none	none	C.C.D. Md.	dismissed
The Falcon	75 (1874)	Swayne	none	none	C.C.D. Md.	reversed
Morgan's Executor v. Gay	81 (1874)	Strong	none	none	C.C.D. La.	reversed
Town of Queensbury v. Culver	83 (1874)	Strong	none	none	C.C.N.D.N.Y.	affirmed
Robertson v. Carson	94 (1874)	Swayne	none	none	C.C.D.S.C.	reversed
Rees v. City of Watertown	107 (1874)	Hunt	none	Clifford	C.C.W.D. Wis.	affirmed
The Pennsylvania	125 (1874)	Strong	none	none	C.C.S.D.N.Y.	reversed
Carpenter v. Rannels	138 (1874)	Swayne	none	none	Mo.	affirmed
Sawyer v. Prickett	146 (1874)	Hunt	none	none	C.C.N.D. Ill.	reversed
Cropley v. Cooper	167 (1874)	Swayne	none	none	Sup. Ct. D.C.	reversed
The Rio Grande	178 (1874)	Clifford	none	none	C.C.D. La.	dismissal denied
Eldred v. Sexton	189 (1874)	Davis	none	none	Wis.	affirmed
United States v. Gaussen	198 (1873)	Hunt	none	none	C.C.D. La.	reversed
Home Life Insurance Company v. Dunn	214 (1874)	Swayne	none	none	Ohio Dist. Ct. App.	reversed
Dollar Savings Bank v. United States	227 (1874)	Strong	none	Bradley	C.C.W.D. Pa.	affirmed
Nugent v. Putnam County	241 (1874)	Strong	none	none	C.C.N.D. Ill.	reversed
Kitchen v. Rayburn	254 (1874)	Strong	none	none	C.C.D. Mo.	affirmed
Caldwell's Case	264 (1874)	Hunt	none	none	Ct. Cl.	reversed
Hall v. Jordan	271 (1873)	Clifford	none	none	Tenn.	affirmed
Coit v. Robinson	274 (1874)	Clifford	none	Bradley	C.C.S.D.N.Y.	dismissed
Mitchell v. Tilghman	287 (1874)	Clifford	none	none	C.C.S.D.N.Y.	reversed
Union Telegraph Company v. Eyser	419 (1873)	Swayne	none	Clifford	Sup. Ct. Terr. Colo.	supersedeas granted
Klein v. Russell	433 (1874)	Swayne	none	none	C.C.N.D.N.Y.	affirmed
City of Nashville v. Ray	468 (1874)	Bradley	Hunt	Clifford	C.C.M.D. Tenn.	reversed
City of Nashville v. Lindsey	485 (1874)	Bradley	none	none	C.C.M.D. Tenn.	reversed
United States v. Arwo	486 (1874)	Clifford	none	none	C.C.S.D.N.Y.	certification
Tappan v. Merchants' National Bank	490 (1874)	Waite	none	none	C.C.N.D. Ill.	reversed
Ex parte Robinson I	505 (1874)	Field	none	none	W.D. Ark.	mandamus granted
Ex parte Robinson II	513 (1873)	Clifford	none	none	W.D. Ark.	advancement denied
Ryan v. United States	514 (1874)	Miller	none	none	C.C.D. Ind.	affirmed
Burke v. Miltenberger	519 (1874)	Davis	none	none	La.	affirmed
Head v. University of Missouri	526 (1874)	Hunt	none	none	Mo.	affirmed
Travellers' Insurance Company v. Seaver	531 (1874)	Miller	none	none	C.C.D. Vt.	reversed
Butt v. Ellett	544 (1874)	Swayne	none	none	C.C.D. La.	affirmed
Confederate Note Case	548 (1874)	Field	none	none	C.C.D.N.C.	affirmed
Nunez v. Dautel	560 (1874)	Swayne	none	none	C.C.S.D. Ga.	affirmed
Williams v. Bankhead	563 (1874)	Bradley	none	none	C.C.E.D. Ark.	reversed
Stevenson v. Williams	572 (1874)	Field	none	none	La.	affirmed
Osborne v. United States	577 (1874)	Waite	none	none	C.C.E.D. Pa.	affirmed
Peete v. Morgan	581 (1874)	Davis	none	none	C.C.E.D. Tex.	affirmed
Dubuque and Sioux City Railroad Company v. Richmond	584 (1874)	Field	none	none	Iowa	affirmed
United States v. Cook	591 (1874)	Waite	none	none	C.C.E.D. Wis.	certification
United States v. Innerarity	595 (1874)	Hunt	none	none	D. La.	reversed
United States v. Jonas	598 (1874)	Davis	none	none	C.C.D. La.	affirmed
Holladay v. Daily	606 (1874)	Field	none	none	Sup. Ct. Terr. Colo.	affirmed
Packet Company v. Sickles	611 (1874)	Miller	none	none	Sup. Ct. D.C.	reversed
Mackay v. Easton	619 (1874)	Field	none	none	C.C.E.D. Mo.	affirmed
Aicardi v. Alabama	635 (1874)	Swayne	none	none	Ala.	affirmed
Great Western Insurance Company v. Fogarty	640 (1874)	Miller	none	none	C.C.S.D.N.Y.	affirmed
Warren v. Van Brunt	646 (1874)	Waite	none	none	Minn.	affirmed
Heine v. Levee Commissioners	655 (1874)	Miller	none	none	C.C.D. La.	affirmed
Boise County v. Gorman	661 (1874)	Waite	none	none	Sup. Ct. Terr. Idaho	dismissed
Pine Grove Township v. Talcott	666 (1874)	Swayne	none	none	C.C.W.D. Mich.	affirmed
