= United States v. Navajo Nation (2009) =

- Supreme Court of the United States

Argued February 23, 2009 Decided April 6, 2009
- Full case name: United States v. Navajo Nation
- Docket no.: 07-1410
- Citations: 556 U.S. 287 (more) 129 S. Ct. 1547; 173 L. Ed. 2d 429; 2009 U.S. LEXIS 2550

Case history
- Prior: 501 F.3d 1327 (Fed. Cir. 2007); cert. granted, 554 U.S. 944 (2008).
- Subsequent: Remanded, 356 F. App'x 374 (Fed. Cir. 2009); judgment vacated, 631 F.3d 1268 (Fed. Cir. 2011).

Holding
- The Navajo Nation's breach of fiduciary duty claim against the Federal Government fails because the Federal Government cannot be sued without its consent.

Court membership
- Chief Justice John Roberts Associate Justices John P. Stevens · Antonin Scalia; Anthony Kennedy · David Souter; Clarence Thomas · Ruth Bader Ginsburg; Stephen Breyer · Samuel Alito

Case opinions
- Majority: Scalia, joined by unanimous
- Concurrence: Souter, joined by Stevens

Laws applied
- 28 U.S.C. § 1505, 25 U.S.C. § 399, 25 U.S.C. § 635(a)

United States v. Navajo Nation, 556 U.S. 287 (2009) was a United States Supreme Court case in which the Navajo Nation initiated proceedings in the Court of Federal Claims alleging that when they sought the assistance of the United States Secretary of the Interior to renegotiate their original leasing agreement with the Peabody Coal Company in 1984, a procedural process defined by the 1964 Indian Mineral Leasing Act (IMLA) of 1938, the United States Secretary of the Interior had been improperly influenced by the coal company, and as a result, had breached his fiduciary duty to the Nation when he approved the 1987 lease amendments.

== Background ==
The Indian Mineral Leasing Act (IMLA) of 1938 was brought to the attention of the Navajo people in 1964 when the Navajo Nation entered into an agreement with a third party to lease a substantial portion of Navajo land for coal mining. The Navajo Nation complained that the United States acted in the interests of a coal mining company, and not in the interests of the Navajo Nation, when negotiating the rate of royalty payments owed on coal mined from Navajo land. The Court of Federal Claims dismissed the complaint, ruling that although the United States had breached its fiduciary obligations to the Navajo Nation, this breach was not actionable because the United States did not have a trust relationship with the Navajo Nation and monetary relief was not available. The court of appeals reversed, holding (1) that a trust relationship existed and exists with the Navajo Nation, and (2) monetary damages are an available remedy for breach of this trust.

=== Questions presented ===
- Whether the court of appeals’ holding that the United States breached fiduciary duties in connection with the Navajo coal lease amendments is foreclosed by Navajo?
- Is the United States liable to the Navajo Nation for up to $600 million in damages for breach of fiduciary duty in connection with the Secretary's actions concerning an Indian mineral lease?
- Did the Secretary violate any specific statutory or regulatory duty established pursuant to the IMLA?

=== Issues ===
Whether the U.S. may be held liable for a breach of fiduciary duty with an Indian Tribe in connection with the negotiation of a mining lease, even when the U.S. has violated no specific statutory or regulatory duty established in the Indian Mineral Leasing Act of 1938?

=== Facts ===
The Navajo Nation is the biggest reservation in the United States, and extends into the states of Utah, Arizona and New Mexico, covering over 27,000 square miles (70,000 km^{2}). Diné Bikéyah, or Navajoland, is larger than 10 of the 50 states in America. The Navajo Nation's (“the Nation’s”) reservation lands contain a vast amount of coal, which is held in trust for the Nation by the federal government. The Nation and the predecessor in interest to the Peabody Western Coal Company (“Peabody”) entered into a lease for access to the Nation's mineral exchange for money. The lease was approved by the Secretary of the Interior with insight that there needs to be reasonable adjustments at the end of the term by the Secretary. While the appeal was pending, both Peabody and Nation anticipated a ruling in favor of the Nation.

== Conclusion ==
The Court ruled that an Indian Tribe must "identify a substantive source of law that establishes specific fiduciary or other duties." The 6-3 opinion by Justice Antonin Scalia held that the IMLA could not be interpreted to require the Secretary to exercise broad authority to manage the tribe's resources for the tribe's benefit. Instead, the tribe itself controls negotiations and the Secretary has a more limited role in approving the agreements. The Court concluded that no provision of the IMLA entitled the tribe to monetary damages as a result of the government's role in the negotiations. Justice Souter, joined by justices Stevens and O'Connor, wrote a dissent arguing that the Secretary's approval power must be exercised for the tribe's benefit, and monetary damages may be awarded if that power is misused.

== See also ==
- List of United States Supreme Court cases, volume 556
- List of United States Supreme Court cases
- Barnhart v. Peabody Coal Co.
