= Harris v. Forklift Systems, Inc. =

- Supreme Court of the United States

Argued October 13, 1993 Decided November 9, 1993
- Full case name: Teresa Harris, Petitioner v. Forklift Systems, Inc.
- Docket no.: 92-1168
- Citations: 510 U.S. 17 (more) 114 S. Ct. 367; 126 L. Ed. 2d 295
- Argument: Oral argument

Case history
- Prior: 976 F.2d 733 (6th Cir. 1992)

Holding
- Sexual harassment claims do not require a showing of psychological injury, but only that a reasonable person would find the conduct hostile or abusive.

Court membership
- Chief Justice William Rehnquist Associate Justices Harry Blackmun · John P. Stevens; Sandra Day O'Connor · Antonin Scalia; Anthony Kennedy · David Souter; Clarence Thomas · Ruth Bader Ginsburg

Case opinions
- Majority: O'Connor, joined by unanimous
- Concurrence: Scalia
- Concurrence: Ginsburg

Laws applied
- 42 U.S.C. § 2000 et seq.

Harris v. Forklift Systems, Inc., 510 U.S. 17 (1993), is a US labor law case in which the Supreme Court of the United States clarified the definition of a "hostile" or "abusive" work environment under Title VII of the Civil Rights Act of 1964. In a unanimous opinion written by Justice Sandra Day O'Connor, the Court held that a determination about whether a work environment is hostile or abusive requires a consideration of all relevant circumstances.

== Facts ==
Title VII of the Civil Rights Act of 1964 states that it is "an unlawful employment practice for an employer . . . to discriminate against any individual with respect to his compensation, terms, conditions, or privileges of employment, because of such individual's race, color, religion, sex, or national origin."

Teresa Harris claimed that the President of Forklift Systems, Inc, Charles Hardy, discriminated against her and subjected her to sexual innuendo at work on multiple occasions, including in front of other employees. She was a manager at the equipment rental company, between April 1985 and October 1987. Harris first complained directly to Hardy about his behavior in August 1987, and he claimed that he was kidding and apologized to Harris. After Harris complained, Hardy said that he would stop that kind of behavior, so Harris stayed at the job. However, in September, Hardy started harassing her again in front of other employees. Harris got her paycheck and quit her job at Forklift Systems, Inc. on October 1. After quitting, Harris sued Forklift Systems, Inc. Harris claimed that Hardy's behavior made an abusive work environment for her based on her gender under Title VII of the Civil Rights Act of 1964.

== Judgment ==
=== District Court of Tennessee ===
The United States District Court for the District of Tennessee stated that Hardy's behavior did not make a cruel work environment for Harris. The District claimed that Hardy's conduct would have made any "reasonable woman" uncomfortable but would not have affected their psychological well being and performance at work. The District Court held that the evidence presented by Harris was not sufficient to show that Hardy's behavior actually affected the conditions of her employment; therefore, there was no Title VII violation.

=== Sixth Circuit, Court of Appeals ===
The United States Court of Appeals, Sixth Circuit, affirmed the District Court's decision. It said a ‘hostile environment’ had to ‘seriously affect psychological well-being’ or mean the plaintiff ‘suffer injury’.

=== Supreme Court ===
The US Supreme Court, reversing the Courts below, held an abusive environment ‘that does not seriously affect employees’ psychological well-being can and often will detract from... job performance, discourage employees from staying on the job, or keep them from advancing in their careers.’ If the environment ‘would reasonably be perceived, and is perceived, as hostile or abusive’ this is enough. It remanded the case. This suit was later settled outside of Court, and the terms were not released.

Justice Sandra Day O'Connor said the following:

This standard, which we reaffirm today, takes a middle path between making actionable any conduct that is merely offensive and requiring the conduct to cause a tangible psychological injury. As we pointed out in Meritor, "mere utterance of an ... epithet which engenders offensive feelings in a employee," ibid. (internal quotation marks omitted) does not sufficiently affect the conditions of employment to implicate Title VII. Conduct that is not severe or pervasive enough to create an objectively hostile or abusive work environment-an environment that a reasonable person would find hostile or abusive-is beyond Title VII's purview. Likewise, if the victim does not subjectively perceive the environment to be abusive, the conduct has not actually altered the conditions of the victim's employment, and there is no Title VII violation.

But Title VII comes into play before the harassing conduct leads to a nervous breakdown. A discriminatorily abusive work environment, even one that does not seriously affect employees' psychological well-being, can and often will detract from employees' job performance, discourage employees from remaining on the job, or keep them from advancing in their careers. Moreover, even without regard to these tangible effects, the very fact that the discriminatory conduct was so severe or pervasive that it created a work environment abusive to employees because of their race, gender, religion, or national origin offends Title VII's broad rule of workplace equality. The appalling conduct alleged in Meritor, and the reference in that case to environments "'so heavily polluted with discrimination as to destroy completely the emotional and psychological stability of minority group workers,'" id., at 66, quoting Rogers v. EEOC, 454 F.2d 234, 238 (CA5 1971), cert. denied, 406 U. S. 957 (1972), merely present some especially egregious examples of harassment. They do not mark the boundary of what is actionable.

We therefore believe the District Court erred in relying on whether the conduct "seriously affect[ed] plaintiff's psychological well-being" or led her to "suffe[r] injury." Such an inquiry may needlessly focus the factfinder's attention on concrete psychological harm, an element Title VII does not require. Certainly Title VII bars conduct that would seriously affect a reasonable person's psychological well-being, but the statute is not limited to such conduct. So long as the environment would reasonably be perceived, and is perceived, as hostile or abusive, Meritor, supra, at 67, there is no need for it also to be psychologically injurious.

This is not, and by its nature cannot be, a mathematically precise test. We need not answer today all the potential questions it raises, nor specifically address the Equal Employment Opportunity Commission's new regulations on this subject, see 58 Fed. Reg. 51266 (1993) (proposed 29 CFR §§ 1609.1, 1609.2); see also 29 CFR § 1604.11 (1993). But we can say that whether an environment is "hostile" or "abusive" can be determined only by looking at all the circumstances. These may include the frequency of the discriminatory conduct; its severity; whether it is physically threatening or humiliating, or a mere offensive utterance; and whether it unreasonably interferes with an employee's work performance. The effect on the employee's psychological well-being is, of course, relevant to determining whether the plaintiff actually found the environment abusive. But while psychological harm, like any other relevant factor, may be taken into account, no single factor is required.

== See also ==
- US labor law
- List of United States Supreme Court cases
- Lists of United States Supreme Court cases by volume
- List of United States Supreme Court cases by the Rehnquist Court
