= List of United States Supreme Court cases, volume 537 =

This is a list of all the United States Supreme Court cases from volume 537 of the United States Reports:

| Case name | Citation | Date decided |
|---|---|---|
| Ford Motor Co. v. McCauley | 537 U.S. 1 | 2002 |
Dismissed as improvidently granted.
| Early v. Packer | 537 U.S. 3 | 2002 |
| INS v. Orlando Ventura | 537 U.S. 12 | 2002 |
| Woodford v. Visciotti | 537 U.S. 19 | 2002 |
| Syngenta Crop Protection, Inc. v. Henson | 537 U.S. 28 | 2002 |
| Yellow Transp., Inc. v. Michigan | 537 U.S. 36 | 2002 |
| Sprietsma v. Mercury Marine | 537 U.S. 51 | 2002 |
| United States v. Bean | 537 U.S. 71 | 2002 |
| Howsam v. Dean Witter Reynolds, Inc. | 537 U.S. 79 | 2002 |
| Abdur'Rahman v. Bell | 537 U.S. 88 | 2002 |
| Borden Ranch Partnership v. Army Corps of Engineers | 537 U.S. 99 | 2002 |
Affirmed by an equally divided court. Kennedy did not participate.
| Sattazahn v. Pennsylvania | 537 U.S. 101 | 2003 |
The Double Jeopardy Clause does not forbid seeking the death penalty after an acquittal on first-degree murder charges.
| Pierce Cnty. v. Guillen | 537 U.S. 129 | 2003 |
| Barnhart v. Peabody Coal Co. | 537 U.S. 149 | 2003 |
| Eldred v. Ashcroft | 537 U.S. 186 | 2003 |
| United States v. Jimenez Recio | 537 U.S. 270 | 2003 |
| Meyer v. Holley | 537 U.S. 280 | 2003 |
| FCC v. NextWave Personal Communications Inc. | 537 U.S. 293 | 2003 |
| Miller-El v. Cockrell | 537 U.S. 322 | 2003 |
| Wash. State Dept. of Social and Health Servs. v. Guardianship Estate of Keffeler | 537 U.S. 371 | 2003 |
| Scheidler v. National Organization for Women | 537 U.S. 393 | 2003 |
| Moseley v. V Secret Catalogue, Inc. | 537 U.S. 418 | 2003 |
| Boeing Co. v. United States | 537 U.S. 437 | 2003 |
| United States v. White Mountain Apache Tribe | 537 U.S. 465 | 2003 |
| United States v. Navajo Nation | 537 U.S. 488 | 2003 |
| Clay v. United States | 537 U.S. 522 | 2003 |
| Chabad v. City of Cincinnati | 537 U.S. 1501 | 2002 |
