= List of United States Supreme Court cases, volume 510 =

This is a list of all United States Supreme Court cases from volume 510 of the United States Reports:

Case name	Citation	Date decided
Day v. Day	510 U.S. 1	1993
In re Sassower	510 U.S. 4	1993
Florence County School Dist. Four v. Carter	510 U.S. 7	1993
Harris v. Forklift Systems, Inc.	510 U.S. 17	1993
Izumi Seimitsu Kogyo Kabushiki Kaisha v. U.S. Philips Corp	510 U.S. 27	1993
Cavanaugh v. Roller	510 U.S. 42	1993
Dismissed as improvidently granted.
United States v. James Daniel Good Real Property	510 U.S. 43	1993
John Hancock Mut. Life Ins. Co. v. Harris Trust and Sav. Bank	510 U.S. 86	1993
Tennessee v. Middlebrooks	510 U.S. 124	1993
Dismissed as improvidently granted. Blackmun dissented without an opinion.
Oklahoma v. New Mexico	510 U.S. 126	1993
Burden v. Zant	510 U.S. 132	1994
Ratzlaf v. United States	510 U.S. 135	1994
Weiss v. United States	510 U.S. 163	1994
Thunder Basin Coal Co. v. Reich	510 U.S. 200	1994
Schiro v. Farley	510 U.S. 222	1994
National Organization for Women, Inc. v. Scheidler	510 U.S. 249	1994
Albright v. Oliver	510 U.S. 266	1994
ABF Freight System, Inc. v. NLRB	510 U.S. 317	1994
Department of Revenue of Ore. v. ACF Industries, Inc.	510 U.S. 332	1994
Northwest Airlines, Inc. v. County of Kent	510 U.S. 355	1994
Caspari v. Bohlen	510 U.S. 383	1994
Hagen v. Utah	510 U.S. 399	1994
American Dredging Co. v. Miller	510 U.S. 443	1994
FDIC v. Meyer	510 U.S. 471	1994
Department of Defense v. FLRA	510 U.S. 487	1994
Elder v. Holloway	510 U.S. 510	1994
Fogerty v. Fantasy, Inc.	510 U.S. 517	1994
Liteky v. United States	510 U.S. 540	1994
Campbell v. Acuff-Rose Music, Inc.	510 U.S. 569	1994
