= Pro-Life Action League =

US non-profit organization

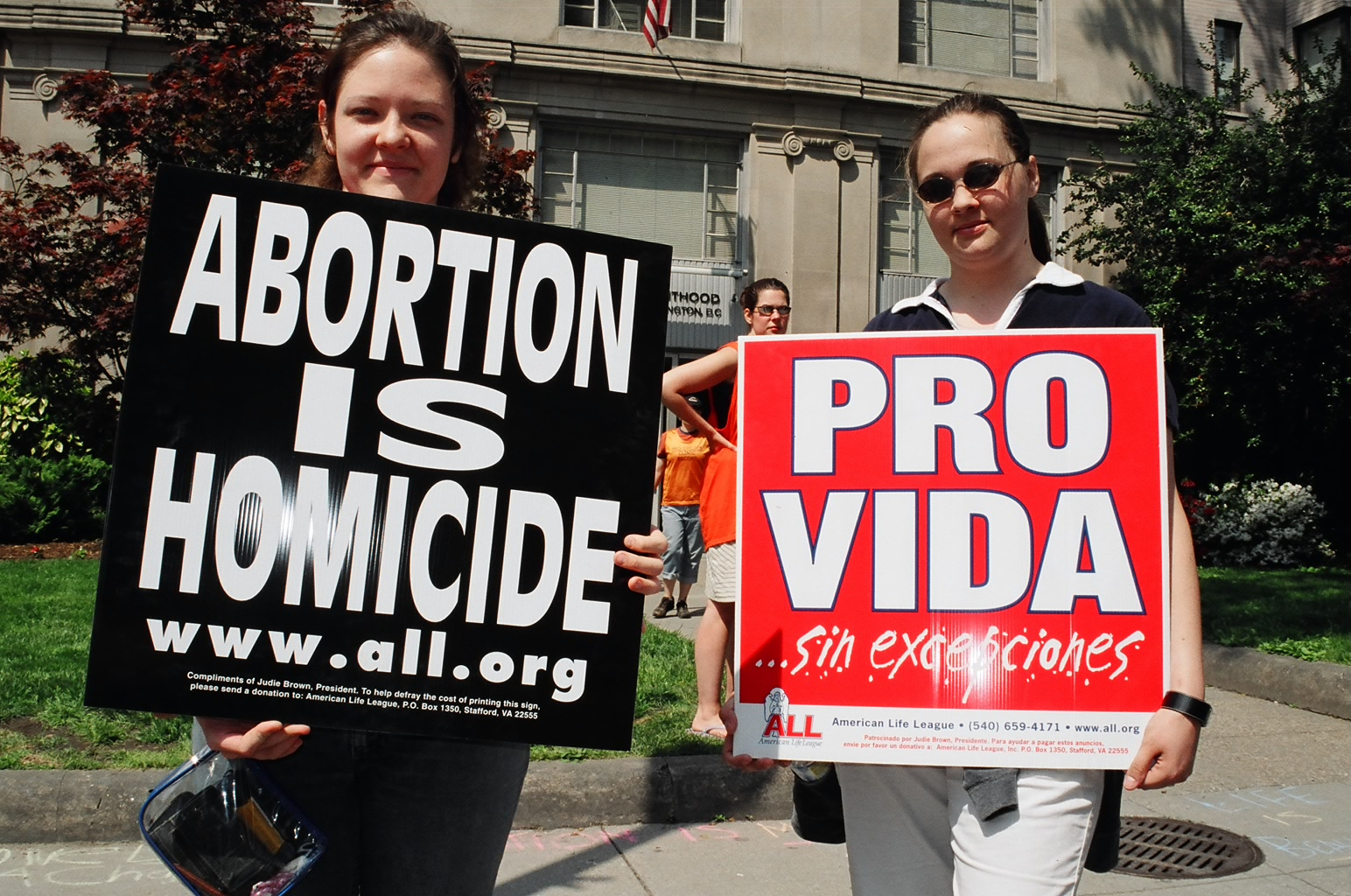

The Pro-Life Action League is an American anti-abortion organization founded by Joseph M. Scheidler in Chicago in 1980. The organization's sole mission is to end abortion. Joe Scheidler was the executive director of the organization until 2015, when his son Eric took over. Joe’s wife Ann is the current president.

The Pro-Life Action League was prominently involved in the Scheidler v. NOW 2006 Supreme Court decision.

The group conducts protests and prayer vigils at abortion clinics. It unsuccessfully campaigned to stop an Aurora Planned Parenthood clinic from opening in September 2007.

== NOW v. Scheidler ==
In 1986, the National Organization for Women (NOW) filed a lawsuit in the United States District Court against various anti-abortion groups and individuals including the Pro-Life Action Network (PLAN) and Scheidler. The suit was filed under the claim that Scheidler and the other defendants had violated the Racketeer Influenced and Corrupt Organizations Act (RICO) through a conspiracy to prevent women from accessing abortion services through the threat of violence or the implied threat of violence. The district court dismissed the case on the grounds that an organization without an economic motive (such as PLAN, a non-profit organization) could not be considered a "racketeering enterprise" under RICO.

The case was then brought to the Court of Appeals where it was determined that a non-profit organization could be considered a racketeering enterprise. This was confirmed by the Supreme Court in 1994, in a 9–0 vote in favor of NOW. This allowed the original case to move forward. The decision did not make any statements about whether or not Scheidler and PLAN were guilty of the racketeering allegations, it stated that they could be tried under RICO.

A trial began in 1998 to determine whether the allegations against Scheidler and PLAN were true and if they were violations of RICO and the Hobbs Act (this was added as a predicate). It was the role of NOW to prove that there had been a national effort by PLAN to prevent women from accessing abortion clinics through violence or the threat thereof. After NOW's testimonies, the jury decided unanimously that PLAN was guilty. The court awarded monetary compensation to NOW, and also ruled that PLAN was forbidden to interfere with NOW's right to provide abortion services.

PLAN appealed to the Seventh Circuit under the claim that they had not violated the Hobbs Act. The act explicitly defines extortion as obtaining property, and PLAN argued that at no point had they taken property from NOW. This claim was rejected and PLAN appealed to the Supreme Court. The court voted unanimously 8-0 in favor of Scheidler and PLAN. It ruled that PLAN, while depriving abortion clinics of property, did not actually acquire anything, meaning PLAN did not commit extortion under the Hobbs Act.

== See also ==
- Anti-abortion organizations in the United States
