= United States v. Mitchell (1983) =

- Supreme Court of the United States

Argued March 1, 1983 Decided June 27, 1983
- Full case name: United States v. Helen Mitchell, et al.
- Citations: 463 U.S. 206 (more) 103 S. Ct. 2961; 77 L. Ed. 2d 580; 1983 U.S. LEXIS 90

Case history
- Prior: Mitchell v. United States, 591 F.2d 1300 (Ct. Cl. 1979); United States v. Mitchell, 445 U.S. 535 (1980); Mitchell v. United States, 664 F.2d 265 (Ct. Cl. 1981)

Holding
- The United States is accountable in money damages for alleged breaches of trust in connection with its management of forest resources on allotted lands of the Quinault Reservation.

Court membership
- Chief Justice Warren E. Burger Associate Justices William J. Brennan Jr. · Byron White; Thurgood Marshall · Harry Blackmun; Lewis F. Powell Jr. · William Rehnquist; John P. Stevens · Sandra Day O'Connor

Case opinions
- Majority: Marshall, joined by Burger, Brennan, White, Blackmun, Stevens
- Dissent: Powell, joined by Rehnquist, O'Connor

Laws applied
- Tucker Act, Indian Tucker Act

United States v. Mitchell, 463 U.S. 206 (1983), was a case in which the Supreme Court of the United States held that the United States is accountable in money damages for alleged breaches of trust in connection with its management of forest resources on allotted lands of the Quinault Reservation.

== Background ==
=== History ===
The Quinault and Quileute tribes, are American Indian (Native American) tribes located on the Quinault and Quileute Reservations in the State of Washington. The tribes were moved onto unsuitable reservations after signing the Treaty of Olympia with the United States in 1855. In 1873 a reservation of 200,000 acres (81,000 ha) was established by Executive Order along the Washington coastline, with most of the reservation being heavily wooded. In 1905, the federal government began transferring or allotting land to individual tribal members under the Indian General Allotment Act and the Quinault Allotment Act. By 1935 the entire reservation had been broken up into 80 acres (32 ha) parcels. The timber resources on the allotted land was managed by the Department of the Interior and the Secretary of the Interior has statutory authority over the sale of timber from allotted trust lands. The Secretary has issued comprehensive regulations on the management of Indian timber resources.

=== Prior court decisions ===
In 1971, 1,465 individuals who owned allotments filed a lawsuit in the Court of Claims alleging that the United States had mismanaged the timber resources on the reservation. Mitchell and the other plaintiffs alleged that the government had breached their fiduciary duty by failing to obtain proper value for timber sold, by failing to properly manage timber resources, and by excessive charges for administrative duties. After discovery had been conducted and a partial trial held in 1977, the government moved to dismiss the suit on jurisdictional grounds. The Court of Claims denied the motion, basing their jurisdiction to hear the case under the Indian General Allotment Act. The United States appealed to the Supreme Court.

The Supreme Court reversed the Court of Claims, holding that the Indian General Allotment Act did not create a trust relationship and that any grounds for recovery must be based on other grounds. The case then returned to the Court of Claims to consider the plaintiff's other claims, and the United States again moved for dismissal. The Court of Claims rejected the motion to dismiss, holding that three other federal laws gave the plaintiffs a cause of action. These three laws dealt with timber sales, regulations and sustained yield, and rights-of-way.

The United States again appealed to the Supreme Court, which granted certiorari to hear the case.

== Opinion of the Court ==
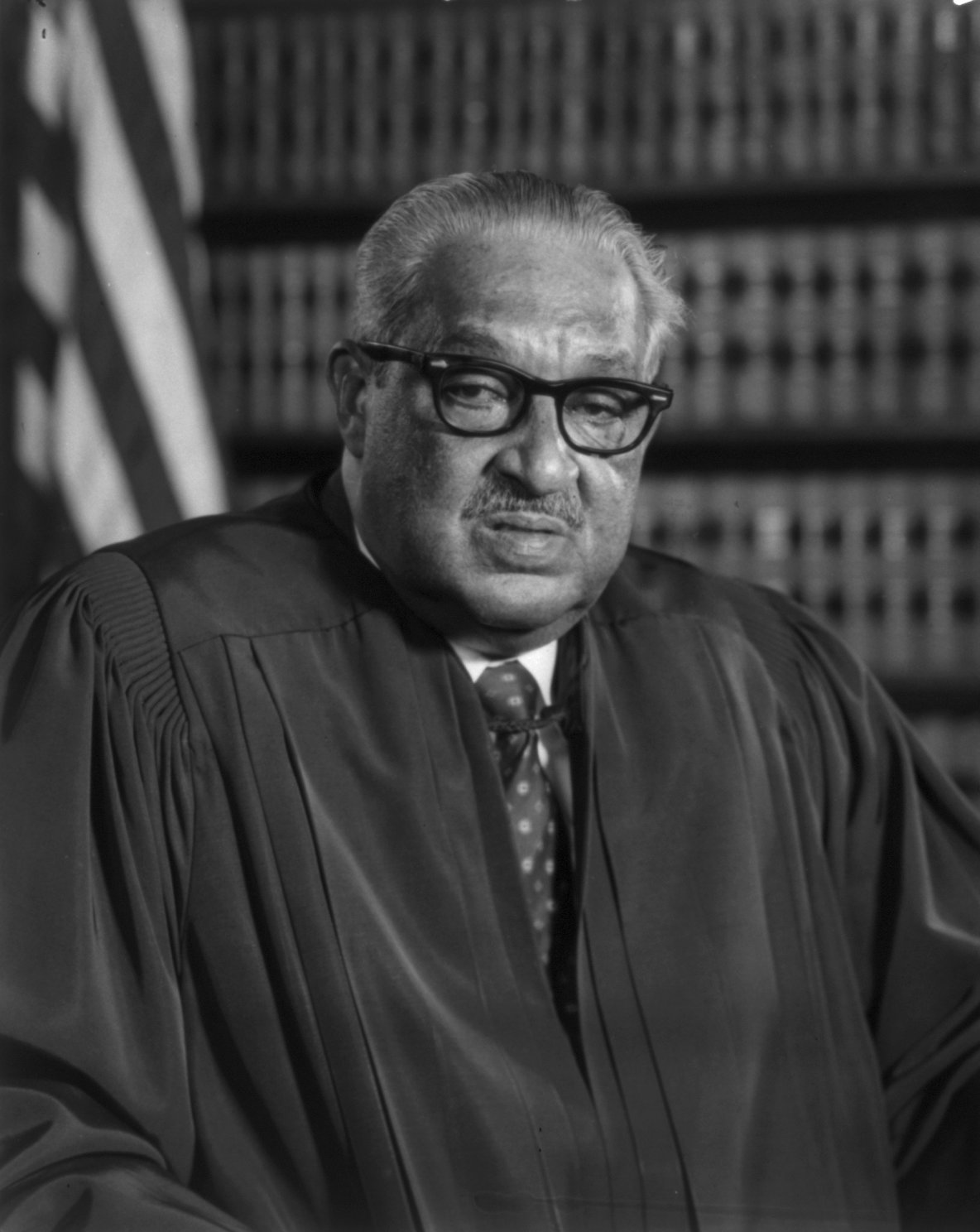
Justice Thurgood Marshall, author of the majority opinion

=== Arguments ===
Joshua I. Schwartz argued the case for the United States. Charles A. Hobbs argued the case for the tribal members. The Shoshone tribe of the Wind River Indian Reservation filed an amicus curiae brief in support of the tribal members. The United States argued that the Court of Claims did not have jurisdiction to hear the case.

=== Majority opinion ===
Justice Thurgood Marshall delivered the opinion of the court. Marshall noted that both the Tucker Act and the Indian Tucker Act waived the sovereign immunity of the United States and allowed the plaintiffs to bring a case to the Court of Claims. Marshall then examined the history of the three statutes that the Court of Claims held created a trust relationship with the plaintiffs. He concluded that the plain language of the statutes created a trust relationship between the United States government and the plaintiffs. Marshall noted that it is well established that a trustee is liable for damages in cases of a breach of fiduciary duties. He stated that it "naturally follows that the Government should be liable in damages for the breach of its fiduciary duties." The decision of the Court of Claims was affirmed.

=== Dissenting opinion ===
Justice Lewis F. Powell, Jr. dissented from the majority opinion. Powell stated that without explicit language establishing liability on the government, there can be no valid claim or subject matter jurisdiction. He would have reversed the decision of the Court of Claims.

== Subsequent developments ==
Mitchell was the first case where the Supreme Court ruled that the United States government could be liable for monetary damages for a trust relationship. As a result, Mitchell has been cited over 1,900 times by courts as of August 2012. Since the fiduciary duty has been established, tribes have been using it to ensure that the Secretary of the Interior takes their needs into consideration, especially in the area of mineral and timber resources.
