= Worldwide usage of police dogs =

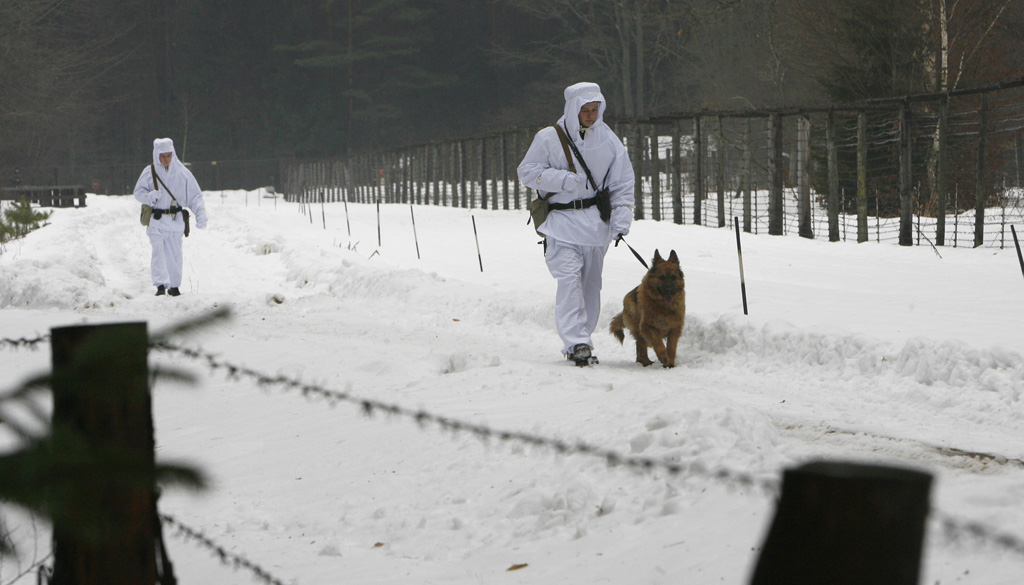
Belarusian Border Guards patrolling the Poland-Belarus border with working dog.

In law enforcement work, police dogs are used worldwide for a variety of purposes that include apprehension, detection, and search and rescue.

== Australia ==
The Australian Federal Police employ "general purpose" police dogs, whose duties include searching for missing persons, suspect apprehension, and keeping the peace. The Australian Federal Police also employ police dogs trained for specialized purposes, such as detecting firearms, explosives, illegal narcotics, and currency. The Australian Border Force also utilizes detector dogs to search for concealed people or illegal products at border checkpoints. Each state has its own police force which has a K9 unit.

== Bangladesh ==
Border Guards Bangladesh, Rapid Action Battalion and the Dhaka Metropolitan Police maintain several dog squads to assist in anti-narcotic and anti-bombing campaigns.

== Belgium ==
The Belgian Canine Support Group is part of the country's federal police. It has 35 dog teams, most of which are Belgian Malinois. Some dogs are trained to detect drugs, human remains, hormones or fire accelerants. About a third are tracker dogs trained to find or identify living people. These teams are often deployed to earthquake areas to locate people trapped in collapsed buildings. The federal police's explosive detector dogs are attached to the Federal Police Special Units.

== Canada ==
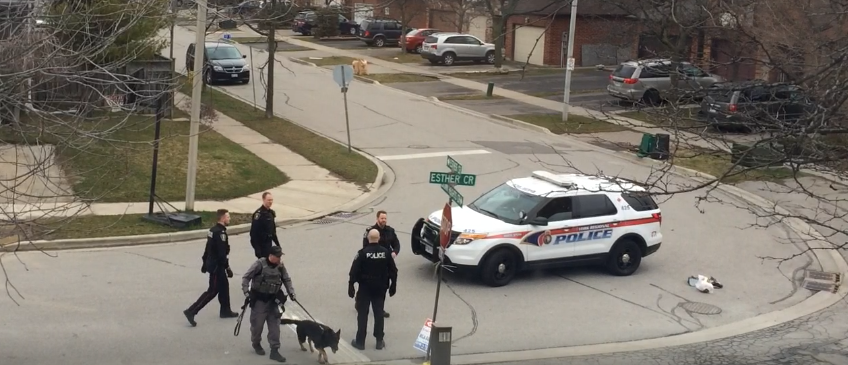
K9 units search for a missing person in York Region, Ontario.

Canadians started using police dogs occasionally in 1908. However, they used privately owned dogs until 1935 when the Royal Canadian Mounted Police (RCMP) saw the value of police dogs and created the first team in 1937. By the 1950s, the RCMP had German Shepherds, Schnauzers, and Doberman Pinschers in service.

Many Canadian municipalities use dog squads as a means of tracking suspects. Most municipalities in Canada employ the bite and hold technique rather than the bark and hold technique meaning once the dog is deployed, it bites the suspect until the dog handler commands it to release. This often results in serious puncture wounds and is traumatic for suspects. A dog has the legal status of property in Canada. As such, developing case law is moving towards absolute liability for the handlers of animals deliberately released to intentionally maim suspects. The dog is effectively a weapon.

In 2010, an Alberta Court of Queen's Bench judge stayed criminal charges against Kirk Steele, a man who was near-fatally shot by a police officer while he stabbed the officer's police dog. The judge found that the shooting was cruel and unusual treatment and excessive force.

Police require reasonable suspicion they will recover evidence in order to use a dog to sniff a person or their possessions in public. This is because using a dog to detect scents is considered a search. The main exemption to that rule are the dogs of the Canada Border Services Agency who are allowed to make searches without warrants under s.98 of the Customs Act.

In 2017, it was reported that the Canadian forces had approximately 170 RCMP dog teams across Canada, and was continuing to grow as more and more Canadian municipalities saw the value of police dogs.

== Denmark ==
There are a total of 240 active police dogs in Denmark, each of which are ranked in one of three groups: Group 1, Group 2 and Group 3. Dogs in Group 1 are very experienced, and highly trained. Group 1 dogs are typically within the age range of four to eight years old and are used for patrolling, rescue, searching for biological evidence and major crime investigations. Group 2 dogs are employed for the same tasks as members of Group 1, but they do not participate in major crime investigations or searching for biological evidence. Group 3 is the beginner rank for police dogs, and are only employed for patrol operations.

== Hong Kong ==
The Police Dog Unit (PDU; Chinese: 警犬隊) was established in 1949 and is a specialist force of the Hong Kong Police under the direct command of the Special Operations Bureau. Their roles are crowd control, search and rescue, and poison and explosive detection. In addition, the PDU works in collaboration with other departments for anti-crime operations.

== India ==
In India, the National Security Guard inducted the Belgian Malinois into its K-9 Unit, Border Security Force, and Central Reserve Police Force use Rajapalayam as guard dogs to support the Force on the borders of Kashmir.

For regional security, the Delhi Police has recruited many of the city's street dogs to be trained for security purposes. The Bengal Police uses German Shepherds, Labrador Retrievers, and the Indian pariah dog in its bomb-sniffing squad.

== Indonesia ==
Police dogs in Indonesia are managed by the Directorate of Animal Police of the Bhayangkara Police Corps of the Indonesian National Police, which is more popularly known as K-9 Detachment. These are elite assets of the Bhayangkara Corps, specially trained to high standards to assist in law enforcement and humanitarian missions.

== Israel ==
Israel utilizes canine units for border patrols to track illegal persons or objects that pose a threat. Police dogs serve in the Israel Police and Israel Prison Service.

== Italy ==
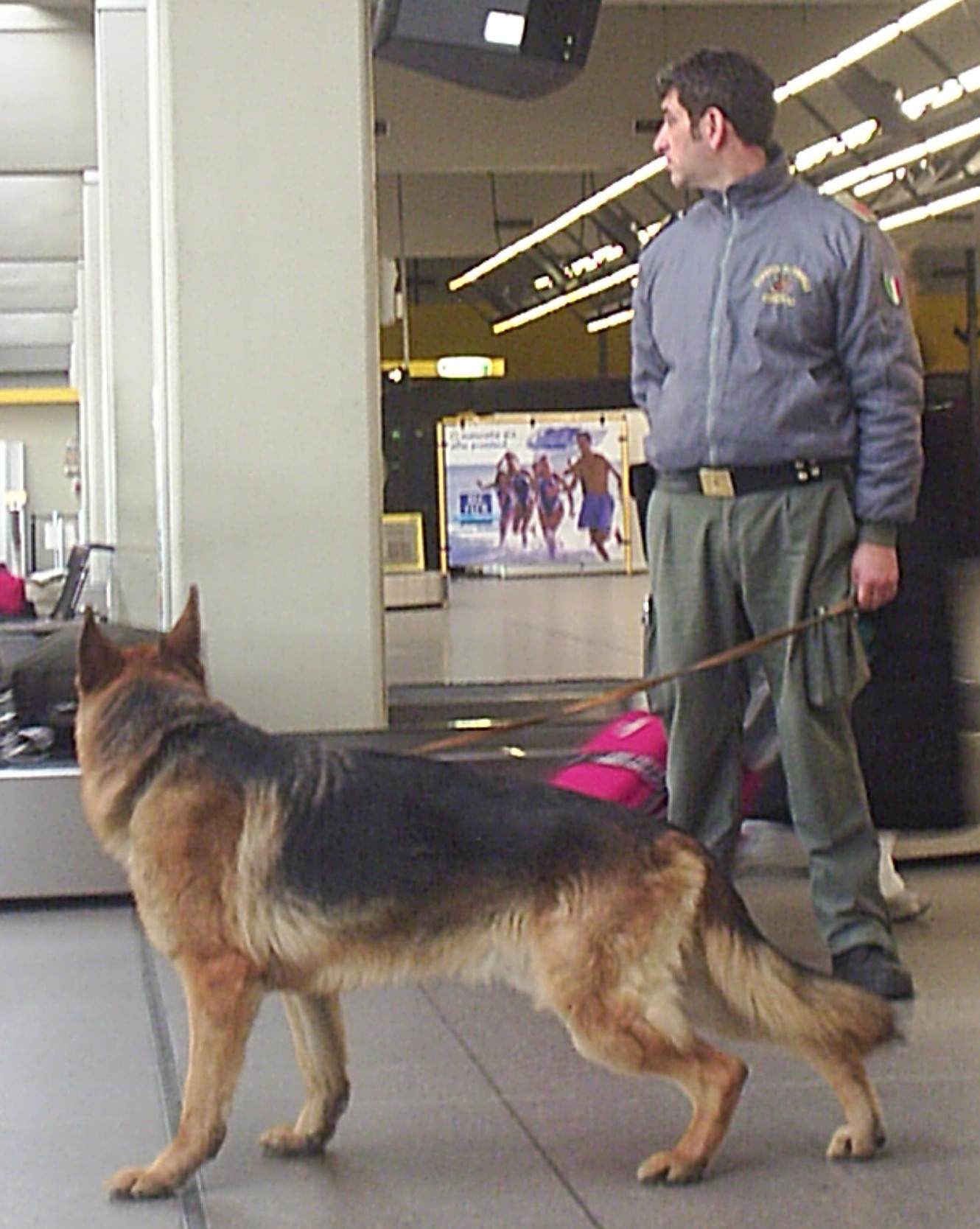
Italian Guardia di Finanza dog in Malpensa airport

All the law enforcement in Italy (Carabinieri, Polizia di Stato and Guardia di Finanza) have in service many patrol dogs for Public Order, Anti-Drug, Anti-explosive, Search and Rescue. The first train centers for police dogs in Italy were established after World War I and in 1924, Italy purchased German Shepherds from Germany for border patrol operations in the Alps. The Carabinieri Kennel Club was formed in 1957 to produce police dogs and train handlers in Italy. German and Belgian shepherds are used for multiple purposes, Labradors for drug, weapons and explosive surveillance and Rottweilers serve for protection.

== Japan ==
Japan is one of the few east Asian countries that have dogs serving in law enforcement as others dislike dogs due to cultural norms. Between the 16th and 19th centuries, samurai had Akita service companions that would defend samurai while they slept at night. In modern times, the German shepherd is the common police dog of the Tokyo Metropolitan Police Department.

== Kenya ==
Police dogs began their service in Kenya in 1948 as part of the Kenya Police Criminal Investigation Department of the Kenya Police. Since the 1950s, the main police dog in service is the German shepherd, with Labradors, Rottweilers and English Springer Spaniels being used for specialized purposes. Since the 2000s, the Kenya Police has increased the breeding and adoption of police dogs with the long-term goal of having canines serving in each police station of Kenya.

== Maldives ==
Dogs are generally banned in the Maldives, making it the only country in the world with a total ban on dogs. However, exceptions exist for the national police, which maintains a small K9 unit of about 25 dogs.

== Nepal ==
The Nepal Police first established a canine unit in 1975 due to increased crime rates and to help with investigations. Since then, police dogs are in service throughout various regions of Nepal and have been present at the Tribhuwan International Airport since 2009.

== Netherlands ==
The Dutch Police Dog Brigade is part of the national police corps national unit, and supports other units with specially trained dogs. The dogs are trained to recognize a single specific scent. They specialize in identifying scents (identifying the scent shared by an object and a person), narcotics, explosives and firearms, detecting human remains, and locating drowning people and fire accelerants.

The 10 regional units also have dog brigades of their own. For example, the canine unit of the regional police East Netherlands.

== Pakistan ==
Pakistan Customs uses a K-9 unit for anti-smuggling operations. Pakistan's Sindh Police also have a specialized K-9 unit.

== Peru ==
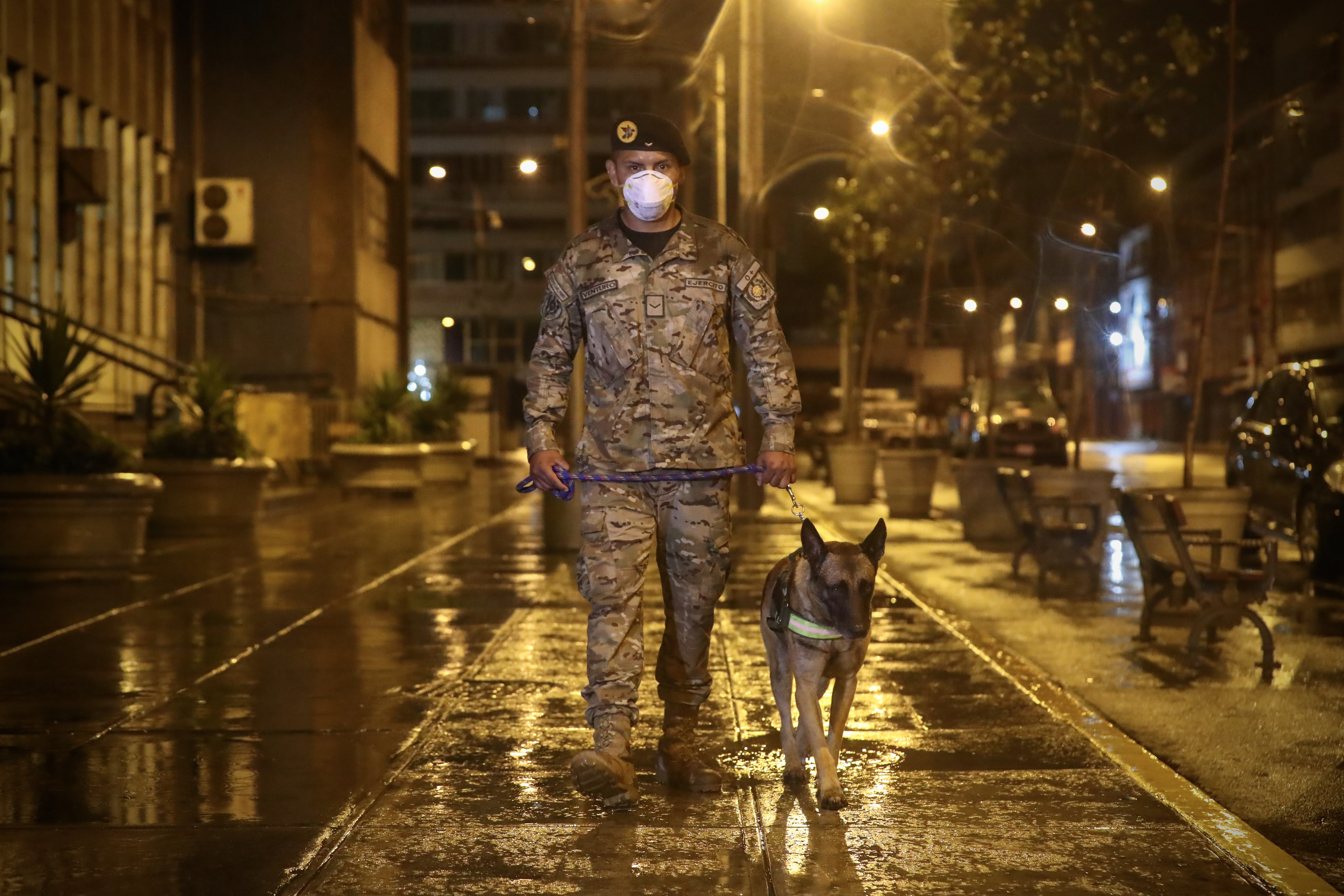
A member of the Peruvian Army with a police dog enforces curfew during the COVID-19 pandemic in Peru

Peru recruits various canine units for various governmental, military and police operations. The National Service of Agrarian Health (SENASA) of the Ministry of Agriculture and Irrigation has the Canine Brigade of Plant Health that detects plants that may violate phytosanitary trade practices and to prevent the contraband importation of pests in plants and fruit. The brigade is present at Jorge Chávez International Airport and in Peruvian territory.

For the National Police of Peru, they prefer the German Shepherd, Belgian Shepherd Malinois, Beagle, Weimaraner, Golden Retriever and Labrador Retriever breeds for their service and accept donations of dogs between the ages of 12 and 24 months. The National Police use canine units for drug surveillance in the country's main airport, Jorge Chávez International Airport, with the force receiving canine training from United States Customs and Border Protection.

The Peruvian Army has canine units trained for search and rescue as well as disaster situations. During the COVID-19 pandemic in Peru, a limitation of gatherings and curfew was enforced with the assistance of canine units that served for law enforcement.

== Russia ==
Police dogs have been used in Russia since 1909 in Saint Petersburg. Attack dogs are used commonly by police and are muzzled at all times unless ordered to apprehend a suspect. Police dogs have also been used to track fugitives, which has remained common in most Soviet Union Successor States.

== Sweden ==
The Swedish Police Authority currently deploys around 400 police canines. There is however no requirement for the dogs to be purebred, as long as they meet mental and physical requirements set by the police. Dogs aged 18–48 months are eligible to take admission tests for the K9 training. The police dogs live with their operators, and after retirement at age 8–10 the operator often assumes the ownership of the dog.

== United Kingdom ==
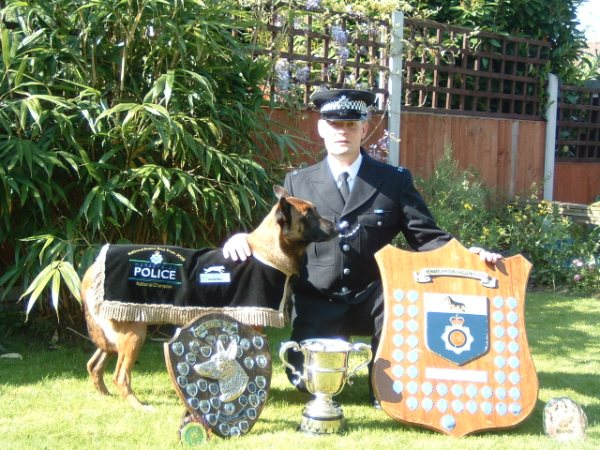
Metropolitan Police Kiro Demi and PC Graham Clarke. UK National Police Dog Champion 2008

Police forces across the country, as well as the RAF Police, employ dogs and handlers and dog training schools are available to cater for the ever-increasing number of dogs being used. The use of police dogs became popular in the 1930s when Scotland Yard officially added dogs to its police force.

There are over 2,500 police dogs employed amongst the various police forces in the UK, with the Belgian Malinois as the most popular breed for general purpose work.In 2008, a Belgian Malinois female handled by PC Graham Clarke won the National Police Dog Trials with the highest score ever recorded, at 914 points out of 1000.

All British police dogs, irrespective of the discipline they are trained in, must be licensed to work operationally. To obtain the licence they have to pass a test at the completion of their training, and then again every year until they retire, which is usually at about the age of 8. The standards required to become operational are laid down by the Association of Chief Police Officers (ACPO) sub-committee on police dogs and are reviewed on a regular basis to ensure that training and licensing reflects the most appropriate methods and standards.

Police dogs are general purpose and specialist. For instance in the Metropolitan, the general purpose types are predominantly German Shepherd with some Belgian Malinois and Dutch Shepherds. Specialist are Cocker Spaniel, Springer spaniels and Labrador Retrievers.

== United States ==
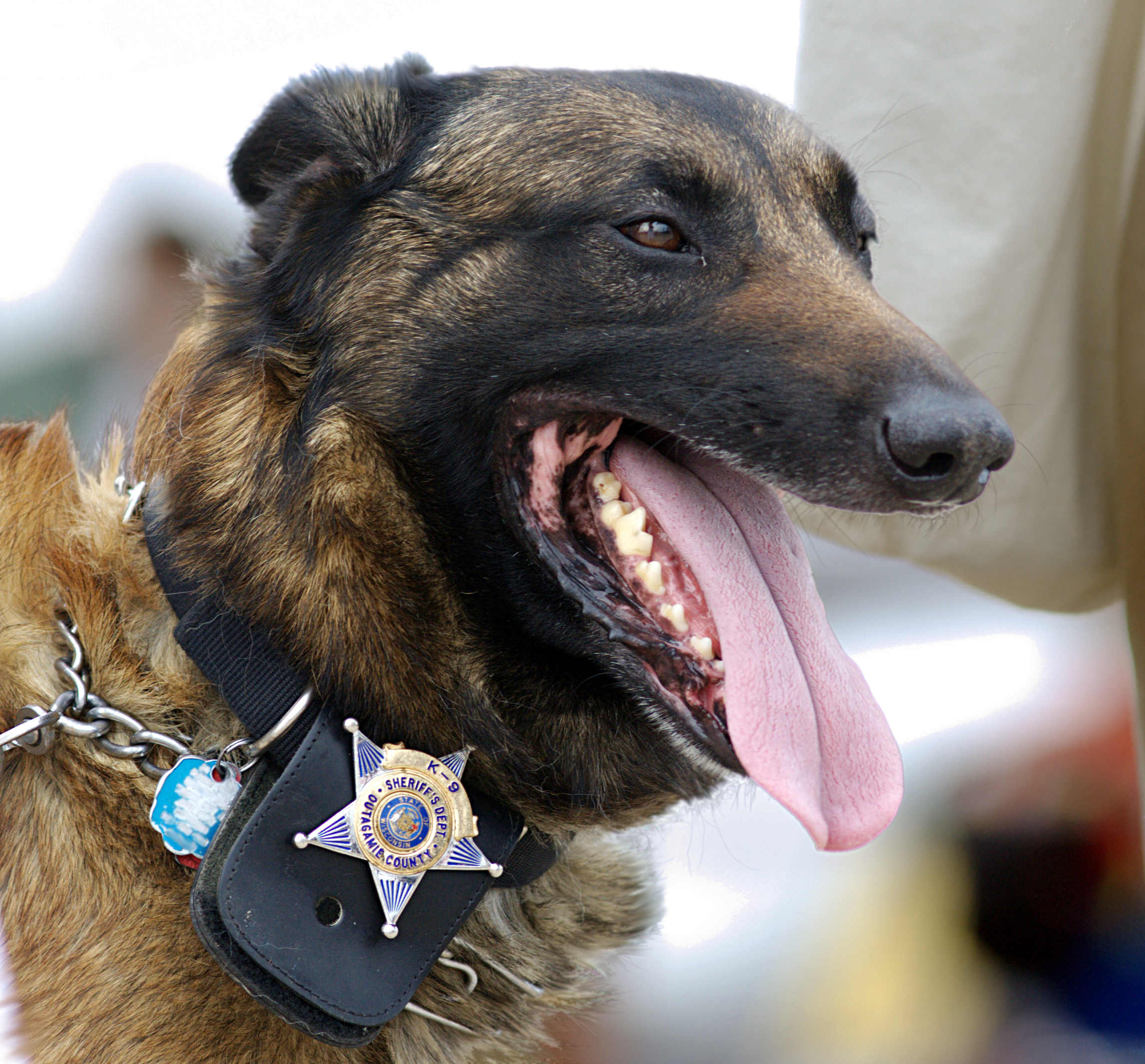
A Belgian Malinois police dog in Wisconsin.

Police dogs are in widespread use across the United States. Police dogs are operated on the federal, state, county, and local levels and are used for a wide variety of duties, similar to those of other nations. Their duties generally include detecting illegal narcotics, explosives, and other weapons, search-and-rescue, and cadaver searches. The most common breeds for everyday duties are the German Shepherd and the Belgian Malinois, though other breeds may be used to perform specific tasks.

On the federal level, police dogs may be seen in some airports assisting Transportation Security Administration officials search for explosives and weapons, or by Customs and Border Protection searching for concealed narcotics and people. Some dogs may also be used by tactical components of such agencies as the Bureau of Alcohol, Tobacco, Firearms, and Explosives, the Federal Bureau of Investigation, and the United States Marshals Service. Federally owned police dogs play a vital role in homeland security. An expert on police dogs, L. Paul Waggoner of the Canine Performance Sciences Program at Auburn University said, "detector dogs are a critical component of national security – and they also provide a very visible and proven deterrent to terrorist activities." The American Kennel Club estimates that between 80 and 90 percent of dogs purchased by the U.S. Department of Homeland Security and U.S. Department of Defense come from foreign vendors, mostly located in Europe.

Most police agencies in the United States – whether state, county, or local – use police dogs as means of law enforcement. Often, even the smallest of departments operates a K-9 division of at least one dog; in these cases, police dogs will usually serve all purposes deemed necessary, most commonly suspect apprehension and narcotics detection, and teams are often on call. In larger cities and metropolitan areas, police departments regularly employ dozens of police dogs. In these cases, individual dogs often serve individual purposes in which each particular animal is specialized, and teams usually serve scheduled shifts. In both cases, police dogs are almost always cared for by their specific handlers. The U.S. Fish and Wildlife Services agency requires police dogs to undergo annual in-service training to recertify their skills and credentials. This training must last at least 24 hours each year.

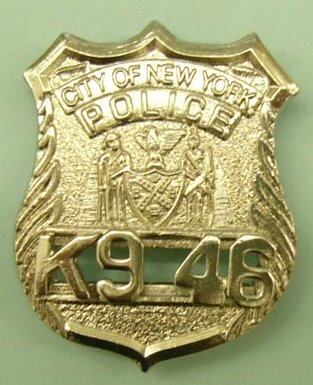
Police badge of a New York K9 officer

Under the Federal Law Enforcement Animal Protection Act, it is a felony to assault or kill a law enforcement animal, including police dogs and police horses, in all 50 states. However, police dogs are not treated as police officers for the purpose of the law, and attacking or killing a police dog is not punishable in the same manner as attacking or killing a human police officer. Although many police departments formally swear dogs in as police officers, this swearing-in is purely honorary, and carries no legal significance.

Police dogs also play a major role in American penal systems. Many jails and prisons will use special dog teams as a means of intervening in large-scale fights or riots by inmates. Also, many penal systems will employ dogs – usually bloodhounds – in searching for escaped prisoners.

In October 2017, the U.S. House Oversight and Government Reform Intergovernmental Affairs Subcommittee held a hearing about whether there is a sufficient supply of dogs that can be trained as police dogs. Congressman Mike Rogers (R-AL) said that the continued ISIS-inspired attacks in the U.S. and all over the world "have driven demand through the roof" for police dogs.

The Marshall Project maintains a database of police dog bites across the United States.

=== Supreme Court cases ===
The United States Supreme Court is the highest federal court in the United States of America. Some U.S. Supreme Court cases that pertain to police dogs are:

- United States v. Place (1983) – The Court held that the sniff of a specially trained police dog is sui generis and it does not violate the Fourth Amendment's prohibition of unreasonable search and seizure for one to sniff a person's personal items in a public place, even if done without a warrant.
- City of Indianapolis v. Edmond (2000) – The Court held that is unconstitutional to set up a highway checkpoint for the primary purpose of illegal narcotic discovery. In the case, the Indianapolis Police Department was using police dogs to detect narcotics at the checkpoint without reasonable suspicion.
- Illinois v. Caballes (2005) – The Court held that police do not need probable cause to bring a drug-detection dog to a vehicle during a legal traffic stop, and searches by a police dog do not count as an invasion of privacy, because a well-trained one will only alert to the presence of illegal substances.
- Florida v. Harris (2013) – The Court held that a police dog's alert to the exterior of a vehicle gives the officer probable cause to search the vehicle without a warrant. Further, the Court affirmed that the state does not have to prove each dog's reliability in order for evidence gathered from them to be valid in court.
- Florida v. Jardines (2013) – The Court held that evidence collected from a police dog at the front door of a house cannot be used in court. The front porch of a house is considered a private place, and the police need probable cause and a search warrant to bring a police dog to the front door.
- Rodriguez v. United States (2015) – The Court held that, without reasonable suspicion, the use of a police dog after the conclusion of a legal traffic stop violates the Fourth Amendment.
