= Florida v. Harris =

- Supreme Court of the United States

Argued October 31, 2012 Decided February 19, 2013
- Full case name: State of Florida v. Clayton Harris
- Docket no.: 11-817
- Citations: 568 U.S. 237 (more) 133 S.Ct. 1050; 185 L. Ed. 2d 61; 2013 U.S. LEXIS 1121; 81 U.S.L.W. 4081

Case history
- Prior: Motion to suppress evid. denied at trial, affirmed (per curiam), 989 So.2d 1214 (Fla. 1st DCA 2008); reversed, 71 So.3d 756, (Fla. S. Ct. 2011); rehearing denied, unpubl. order, (Fla. S. Ct. 2011); cert. granted, 566 U.S. 904 (2012).

Holding
- If a bona fide organization has certified a dog after testing his reliability in a controlled setting, or if the dog has recently and successfully completed a training program that evaluated his proficiency, a court can presume (subject to any conflicting evidence offered) that the dog's alert provides probable cause to search, using a "totality-of-the-circumstances" approach.

Court membership
- Chief Justice John Roberts Associate Justices Antonin Scalia · Anthony Kennedy; Clarence Thomas · Ruth Bader Ginsburg; Stephen Breyer · Samuel Alito; Sonia Sotomayor · Elena Kagan

Case opinion
- Majority: Kagan, joined by unanimous

Laws applied
- U.S. Const. Amend. IV

Florida v. Harris, 568 U.S. 237 (2013), was a case in which the United States Supreme Court addressed the reliability of a dog sniff by a detection dog trained to identify narcotics, under the specific context of whether law enforcement's assertions that the dog is trained or certified is sufficient to establish probable cause for a search of a vehicle under the Fourth Amendment to the United States Constitution. Harris was the first Supreme Court case to challenge the dog's reliability, backed by data that asserts that on average, up to 80% of a dog's alerts are wrong. Twenty-four U.S. States, the federal government, and two U.S. territories filed briefs in support of Florida as amici curiae.

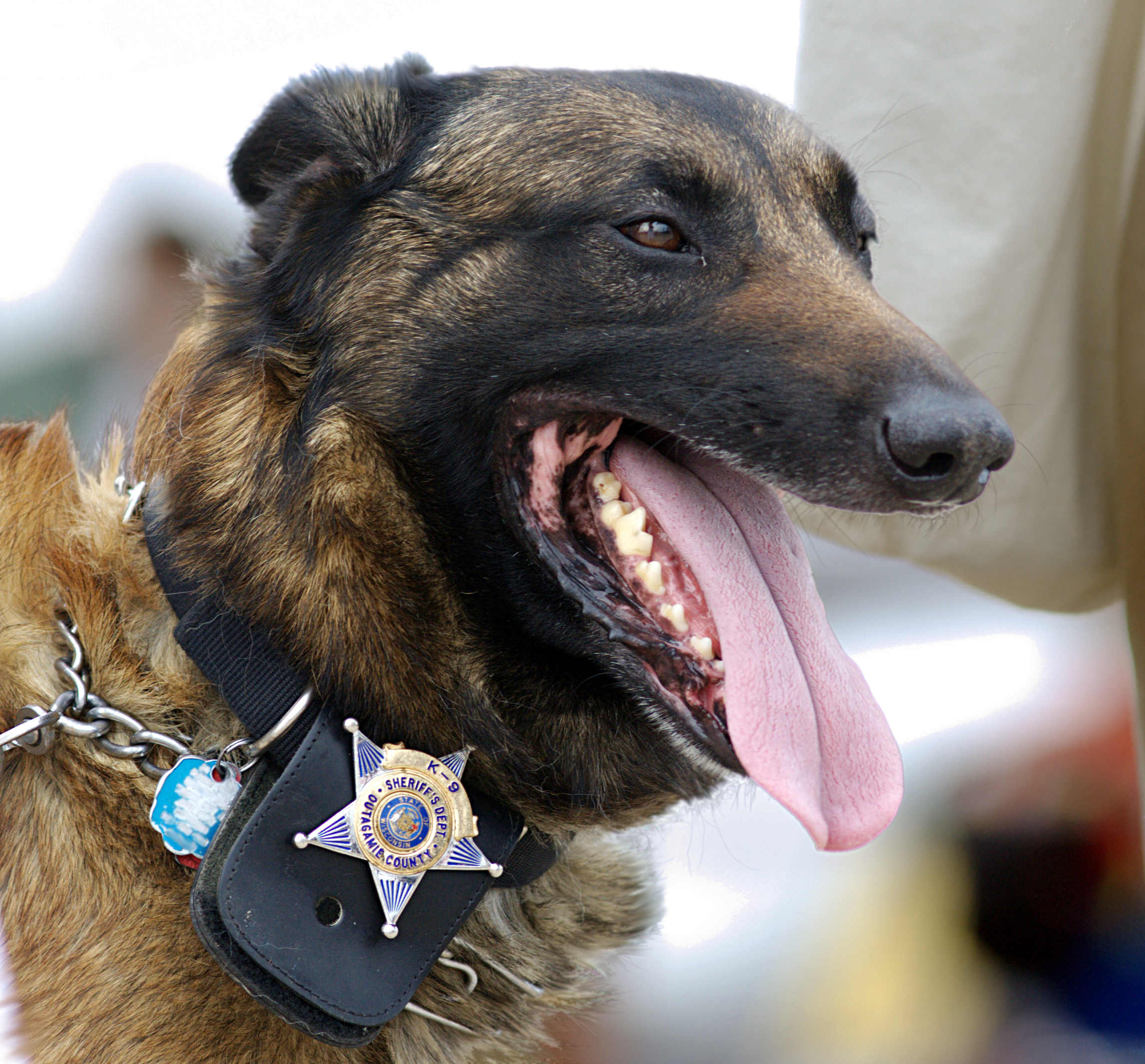
Police dog

Oral argument in this case – and that of another dog sniff case, Florida v. Jardines – was heard on October 31, 2012. The Court unanimously held that if a bona fide organization has certified a dog after testing his reliability in a controlled setting, or if the dog has recently and successfully completed a training program that evaluated his proficiency, a court can presume (subject to any conflicting evidence offered) that the dog's alert provides probable cause to search, using a "totality-of-the-circumstances" approach.

== Background ==
Prior to this case, the United States Supreme Court has on three occasions dealt with cases involving "dog sniffs" by detection dogs trained to identify narcotics, and has addressed whether or not a dog sniff constituted a "search" under the Fourth Amendment. In those three cases, the Supreme Court has held that:

... the canine sniff is sui generis. We are aware of no other investigative procedure that is so limited both in the manner in which the information is obtained and in the content of the information revealed by the procedure.

— United States v. Place, 462 U.S. 696, 706 (1983)

The fact that officers walk a narcotics-detection dog around the exterior of each car at the Indianapolis checkpoints does not transform the seizure into a search.

— City of Indianapolis v. Edmond, 531 U.S. 32, 40 (2000)

A dog sniff conducted during a concededly lawful traffic stop that reveals no information other than the location of a substance that no individual has any right to possess does not violate the Fourth Amendment.

— Illinois v. Caballes, 543 U.S. 405, 410 (2005)

Indeed, the question of whether or not a canine sniff is a "search" was not at issue in this case. One passage from Caballes does, however, foretell the issue in the instant case:

Respondent likewise concedes that "drug sniffs are designed, and if properly conducted are generally likely, to reveal only the presence of contraband." Although respondent argues that the error rates, particularly the existence of false positives, call into question the premise that drug-detection dogs alert only to contraband, the record contains no evidence or findings that support his argument. Moreover, respondent does not suggest that an erroneous alert, in and of itself, reveals any legitimate private information, and, in this case, the trial judge found that the dog sniff was sufficiently reliable to establish probable cause to conduct a full-blown search of the trunk." (emphasis added)(citation omitted)

— Illinois v. Caballes, 543 U.S. 405, 409 (2005)

This case addressed whether that dog's alert alone is sufficient to establish probable cause for a search, or whether law enforcement must first establish the reliability of such an alert.

== Facts of the case ==
On June 24, 2006, a Liberty County, Florida Sheriff's Canine Officer Wheetley and his drug-detection dog, Aldo, were on patrol. The officer conducted a traffic stop of defendant Clayton Harris's truck because his tag had expired. Approaching the truck, the officer noticed that the defendant was shaking, breathing fast, and appeared agitated – he also noticed an open beer container in the vehicle's cup holder. When the defendant refused consent to search the truck, the officer deployed Aldo to walk around the truck. As he performed a "free air sniff" of the truck's exterior, the dog alerted his handler to the driver's side door handle.

The officer then searched the vehicle, and found over 200 pseudoephedrine pills in a plastic bag under the driver's seat. On the passenger's side, the officer found boxes containing a total of 8000 matches. Harris was then placed under arrest, and a further search uncovered muriatic acid, antifreeze/water remover, a foam plate inside a latex glove, and a coffee filter with iodine crystals. The officer testified that these chemicals are precursors of methamphetamine. After being read his Miranda rights, Harris stated that he had been "cooking meth" for about one year, and had most recently cooked it at his home two weeks prior. As no methamphetamine was found in the vehicle, the State charged Harris with possession of the listed chemical pseudoephedrine with intent to use it to manufacture methamphetamine.

About two months after the June 24 stop, Harris was again stopped by the same officer for another traffic infraction. During that stop, the officer again deployed Aldo – who once again alerted to the driver's side door handle. The officer again searched the vehicle, and found no illegal substances, save for an open bottle of alcoholic beverage.

The trial court denied Harris's motion to suppress the evidence produced by the search, and instead found that there was probable cause to support the search. The decision of the Florida First District Court of Appeal (DCA), in a per curiam decision, affirmed the trial court's ruling. The First District, without elaboration, cited State v. Laveroni (2005) and State v. Coleman (2005) as authority in support of affirming the trial court.

Harris sought review by the Supreme Court of Florida, based on contradictory appellate rulings from other districts, namely Gibson v. State (2007) and Matheson v. State (2003).

In his challenge, Harris pointed out that on each of the two occasions in which his vehicle was searched, the dog alerted his handler to contraband which was not present in the vehicle.

== Aldo's training and reliability ==
The police officer testified that on the date of Harris's arrest, he had been on the force for three years, and had been a canine handler for two. Aldo completed a 120-hour drug detection training course two years earlier with his handler at the time, and was certified by an independent company that certifies K-9s. Aldo is trained and certified to detect cannabis, cocaine, ecstasy, heroin, and methamphetamine – he is not trained to detect alcohol or pseudoephedrine. Although pseudoephedrine is a precursor to methamphetamine, there was no testimony as to whether a dog trained to detect methamphetamine would also detect pseudoephedrine.

Officer Wheetley and Aldo were partnered for a year before the Harris stop, and they completed an annual forty-hour training seminar four months prior to that stop. In addition, the officer spends four hours per week training Aldo in detecting drugs in vehicles, buildings, and warehouses. For example, the officer testified, he may take Aldo to a wrecker yard and plant drugs in six to eight out of ten vehicles. Aldo must alert the handler to the vehicles with drugs, and he is rewarded when he does so. Aldo's rate of success during these sessions was described as "really good". The dog's training records, which the officer began keeping six months prior to Harris's stop, showed that on a dual grade of "satisfactory" or "unsatisfactory", Aldo performed "satisfactory" 100% of the time. The officer did not track false positives, nor did he explain whether any false positive alerts by Aldo would affect his "satisfactory" performance rating.

In Florida, a single-purpose dog like Aldo, such as one trained only to detect drugs, is not required by law to carry certification. In contrast, a dual-purpose dog, such as one trained in both apprehension and drug detection, must carry Florida Department of Law Enforcement (FDLE) certification.

As for Aldo's performance in the field, the Florida Supreme Court noted that:

Officer Wheetley maintains records of Aldo's field performance only when [he] makes an arrest. Officer Wheetley testified that he does not keep records of Aldo's alerts in the field when no contraband is found; he documents only Aldo's successes. These records were neither produced prior to the hearing nor introduced at the hearing. Thus, it is impossible to determine what percentage of time Aldo alerted and no contraband was found following a warrantless search of the vehicle.

— Florida Supreme Court, Harris v. State of Florida, 71 So.3d 756, 761 (Fla. 2011).

== Lower court ==
As a result, the Florida Supreme Court reversed, saying:

Like the informant whose information forms the basis for probable cause, where the dog's alert is the linchpin of the probable cause analysis, such as in this case, the reliability of the dog to alert to illegal substances within the vehicle is crucial to determining whether probable cause exists. ... We conclude that when a dog alerts, the fact that the dog has been trained and certified is simply not enough to establish probable cause to search the interior of the vehicle and the person. We first note that there is no uniform standard in this state or nationwide for an acceptable level of training, testing, or certification for drug-detection dogs. ... Second, ... any presumption of reliability ... does not take into account the potential for false alerts, the potential for handler error, and the possibility of alerts to residual odors.

— Florida Supreme Court, Harris v. State of Florida, 71 So.3d 756, 767–768 (Fla. 2011).

Additionally, the Florida Supreme Court cited one commentator's description of the "'mythic infallibility' of the dog's nose":

In cases involving dog sniffing for narcotics it is particularly evident that the courts often accept the mythic dog with an almost superstitious faith. The myth so completely has dominated the judicial psyche in those cases that the courts either assume the reliability of the sniff or address the question cursorily; the dog is the clear and consistent winner.

— A.E. Taslitz, Does the Cold Nose Know? The Unscientific Myth of the Dog Scent Lineup

== Supreme Court ==
The State of Florida petitioned the United States Supreme Court for a writ of certiorari, which was granted on March 26, 2012.

=== Question presented ===
Harris raises the following issues:

1. Whether officers may search a vehicle based solely on an alert by a drug dog.
2. What is required to establish that a drug dog is well-trained?

=== Amicus curiae ===
Briefs of amicus curiae were filed in support of the petitioner by:

- United States of America
- The States of Alabama, Arizona, Colorado, Delaware, Idaho, Illinois, Indiana, Kansas, Maine, Michigan, Missouri, Nebraska, New Jersey, New Mexico, North Dakota, Oklahoma, Oregon, Pennsylvania, Texas, Utah, Vermont, Virginia, Washington and Wisconsin, plus Puerto Rico and Guam
- National Police Canine Association and Police K-9 Magazine

Briefs of amicus curiae were filed in support of the respondent by:

- National Association of Criminal Defense Lawyers, the American Civil Liberties Union, et al.
- Rutherford Institute
- Electronic Privacy Information Center (EPIC)
- Fourth Amendment Scholars (34 college law professors)
- Institute for Justice

=== Arguments ===
Oral arguments
Recording of oral arguments before the Supreme Court.

Oral argument was heard on October 31, 2012. This case was heard on the same day as that of another dog sniff case, Florida v. Jardines. That case addresses whether a dog sniff at the front door of a house is a Fourth Amendment search requiring probable cause and a search warrant, or whether it is an acceptable minimally invasive warrantless search.

==== False alerts in the field ====
In Harris, one of the major points raised by a number of the amici curiae is that a dog's training or certification does not necessarily reflect that dog's reliability in the field. They point to what they say are "the most comprehensive data available on the rate of false alerts in real-world settings" – several years' of studies undertaken by an independent government agency in Sydney, Australia, under the Police Powers (Drug Detection Dogs) Act 2001. Police dogs went through an initial 6 weeks of training to detect cannabis, ecstasy, methamphetamine, cocaine and heroin, received additional training weekly, and were tested and re-certified every three months. The police dogs would randomly sniff individuals at train stations, licensed premises, on streets and sidewalks, at nightclub strips, shopping centers, concerts, and other public locations – the dog would sit next to a person if it alerted. In the first 9 months of 2011, dogs alerted (and police searched) 14,102 times, and drugs were found only 2,854 times—a false alert rate of 80%. Those results, they say, are surprisingly consistent – in 2010, the false alert rate was 74%. Further still, the study found that individual dog's performance varied wildly, with accuracy rates ranging from a high of 56% to a low of 7%, with two-thirds of the dogs performing below the average. The New South Wales' Ombudsman summarized his report by saying:

Despite the best efforts of police officers, the use of drug detection dogs has proven to be an ineffective tool for detecting drug dealers. Overwhelmingly, the use of drug detection dogs has led to public searches of individuals in which no drugs were found, or to the detection of (mostly young) adults in possession of very small amounts of cannabis for personal use. These findings have led us to question whether the Drug Dogs Act will ever provide a fair, efficacious and cost effective tool to target drug supply. Given this, we have recommended that the starting point, when considering this report, is to review whether the Drug Dogs Act should be retained at all."

Prosecutors, on the other hand, say that does not prove anything. They point to "residual odors", meaning that the individuals may have in fact been in contact with drugs earlier and the drugs were no longer present, or the drugs may have been extremely well-hidden. In a reply brief, Pam Bondi, Attorney General of Florida, wrote:

When you enter the kitchen and smell popcorn, the fact that someone has already eaten all the popcorn and put the bag outside in the trash takes nothing away from the fact that you accurately smelled popcorn in the kitchen."

=== Decision ===
The United States Supreme Court returned a unanimous decision on February 19, 2013, ruling against Harris and overturning the ruling of the Florida Supreme Court. In the unanimous opinion, Justice Elena Kagan stated that the dog's certification and continued training are adequate indication of his reliability, and thus is sufficient to presume the dog's alert provides probable cause to search, using the "totality-of-the-circumstances" test per Illinois v. Gates. She wrote that the Florida Supreme Court instead established "a strict evidentiary checklist", where "an alert cannot establish probable cause ... unless the State introduces comprehensive documentation of the dog's prior 'hits' and 'misses' in the field ... No matter how much other proof the State offers of the dog's reliability, the absent field performance records will preclude a finding of probable cause."

The Court did not, however, rule out the questioning of reliability where specific grounds are present. Kagan also stated that "a defendant must have an opportunity to challenge such evidence of a dog's reliability, whether by cross-examining the testifying officer or by introducing his own fact or expert witnesses. The defendant may contest training or testing standards as flawed, or too lax, or raise an issue regarding the particular alert."

== See also ==
- Detection dog
- Police dog
- Rodriguez v. United States, No. 13-9972, 575 U.S. 348 (2015)
- Florida v. Jardines, No. 11-564, 569 U.S. 1 (2013)
- Illinois v. Caballes, 543 U.S. 405 (2005)
- Katz v. United States, 389 U.S. 347 (1967)
- Kyllo v. United States, 533 U.S. 27 (2001)
- United States v. Karo, 468 U.S. 705 (1984)
- Payton v. New York, 445 U.S. 573 (1980)
- Aguilar–Spinelli test
- List of United States Supreme Court cases, volume 568
