= Minimally invasive warrantless search =

In United States Constitutional Law, a minimally intrusive/invasive warrantless search is a type of search that does not breach the boundaries of the property and is performed without any prerequisite search warrant. These searches are contested regularly in courts, and have been ruled for and against under different circumstances. The primary debate concerns the method in which the search is conducted, and also the area being searched. Issues concerning warrantless search and subsequent seizure are always of local concern, because they are a community law enforcement issue as well as a national law issue.

Debate centers on whether the home holds special legal sanctity against warrantless search, unlike an automobile. Automobiles stopped on public roads can be searched without warrants because the searched party is still on public property. Warrantless searches can also be performed in public buildings, such as museums and airports. However, because the home is the private property of the owner, homes have different protections against warrantless searches. The United States Supreme Court has addressed these issues in a number of cases.

== Katz v. United States ==
In Katz v. United States, 389 U.S. 347 (1967), electronic eavesdropping devices attached to the outside of a phonebooth or a home were deemed to violate the unreasonable search and seizure clause of the Fourth Amendment to the United States Constitution, because the interior private life of the homeowners was exposed along with information about illegal activity. Overruling Olmstead v. United States and Goldman v. United States, the Court ruled that this minimally intrusive bugging for the purpose of exposing illegal activity was unconstitutional, because it intruded on private civilian life. This is precedence for protecting civilians against minimally invasive means of exposing criminal activity.

== Kyllo v. United States ==
In Kyllo v. United States, 533 U.S. 27 (2001), the Court held that the use of a thermal imaging device from a public vantage point to monitor the radiation of heat from a person's home to identify home drug cultivation was deemed unconstitutional, because in addition to exposing illegal activity without a warrant, the privacy of the home was compromised. This case specifically highlights this duality: the right to privacy protected by the Fourth Amendment to the United States Constitution, and the denial of right to contraband as a concept enmeshed in the concept of rule of law.

== Illinois v. Caballes ==
In Illinois v. Caballes, 543 U.S. 405 (2005), the Supreme Court ruled that a minimally intrusive warrantless dog sniff of the car was constitutional at traffic stops. This ruling was based on the premise that the police never entered the car and were instead on public property when they did the search. In Caballes and other previous rulings the court asserted that an individual has no reasonable expectation of privacy on public property. Thereby this ruling upheld the constitutionality of certain minimally intrusive warrantless searches.

Illinois v. Caballes called into question certain aspects of Kyllo v. United States. Justice Stevens asserted that the Kyllo search was only unconstitutional due to the fact that it revealed certain aspects of the home besides the presence or absence of contraband. This opened the door to the current minimally intrusive drug sniffs of the home which can only detect the presence or absence of drugs.

== Florida v. Jardines ==
Florida v. Jardines (2013) was Supreme Court case that decided the legality of deploying drug-sniffing dogs around the perimeter of homes without a search warrant. The Supreme Court held that police use of a trained detection dog to sniff for narcotics on the front porch of a private home is a "search" within the meaning of the Fourth Amendment to the United States Constitution, and therefore requires both probable cause and a search warrant.

== See also ==
- Surveillance
- Olmstead v. United States, 277 U.S. 438 (1928)
- United States v. Graham, 11-0094, LEXIS 26954 (D. Md. Mar. 1, 2012)
- United States v. U.S. District Court, 407 U.S. 297 (1972)
- United States v. Place, 462 U.S. 696 (1983)
