= Rodriguez v. United States =

- Supreme Court of the United States

Argued January 21, 2015 Decided April 21, 2015
- Full case name: Dennys Rodriguez, Petitioner v. United States
- Docket no.: 13-9972
- Citations: 575 U.S. 348 (more) 135 S. Ct. 1609; 191 L. Ed. 2d 492; 83 U.S.L.W. 4241
- Argument: Oral argument
- Opinion announcement: Opinion announcement

Case history
- Prior: United States v. Rodriguez, 741 F.3d 905 (8th Cir. 2014)

Holding
- Absent reasonable suspicion, officers may not extend the length of a traffic stop to conduct a dog sniff

Court membership
- Chief Justice John Roberts Associate Justices Antonin Scalia · Anthony Kennedy; Clarence Thomas · Ruth Bader Ginsburg; Stephen Breyer · Samuel Alito; Sonia Sotomayor · Elena Kagan

Case opinions
- Majority: Ginsburg, joined by Roberts, Scalia, Breyer, Sotomayor, Kagan
- Dissent: Kennedy
- Dissent: Thomas, joined by Alito; Kennedy (all but Part III)
- Dissent: Alito

Laws applied
- U.S. Const. amend. IV

Rodriguez v. United States, 575 U.S. 348 (2015), was a United States Supreme Court case which analyzed whether police officers may extend the length of a traffic stop to conduct a search with a trained detection dog. In a 6–3 opinion, the Court held that officers may not extend the length of a traffic stop to conduct a dog sniff unrelated to the original purpose of the stop. However, the Court remanded the case to the United States Court of Appeals for the Eighth Circuit to determine whether the officer's extension of the traffic stop was independently justified by reasonable suspicion. Some analysts have suggested that the Court's decision to limit police authority was influenced by ongoing protests in Ferguson, Missouri.

== Background ==
=== Constitutional guidelines for traffic stops ===
Criminal detentions generally require probable cause that the suspect is engaged in criminal activity, but an officer may conduct a traffic stop if the officer has a reasonable, articulable suspicion that the driver is engaging in criminal activity. The Supreme Court of the United States has held that investigative detentions, including traffic stops, "must be temporary and last no longer than is necessary to effectuate the purpose of the stop". Consequently, traffic stops may become unreasonable if they are unnecessarily prolonged.

When an officer conducts a traffic stop based on reasonable suspicion that the driver has committed a traffic violation, the Fourth Amendment permits the officer to conduct a number of investigative inquiries before resolving the traffic stop. For example, officers may question the vehicle's occupants about matters unrelated to the traffic violation, and officers may walk a drug detection dog around the outside of the vehicle during the stop. Officers may briefly prolong traffic stops to conduct these inquiries so long as the officer performs his tasks in an amount of time "reasonably needed to effectuate" the law enforcement purpose of the stop.

=== Arrest of Dennys Rodriguez ===
On the evening of March 27, 2012, Dennys Rodriguez was stopped by a police officer on a highway near Waterloo, Nebraska, after the officer observed him swerve out of his lane of traffic. When the officer approached the vehicle, he reported an "overwhelming" scent of air-fresheners emanating from the car. After questioning Rodriguez and another passenger in the car, the officer placed a call for backup and conducted a records check on the vehicle's passenger. The officer handed a warning ticket to Rodriguez, and then proceeded to walk Floyd, his drug detection dog, around the outside of Rodriguez's vehicle. When the dog indicated the presence of drugs, the officer searched the car and discovered methamphetamine inside the vehicle. The officer reported that approximately seven or eight minutes passed between the time he issued the warning ticket to the time at which the dog indicated the presence of drugs.

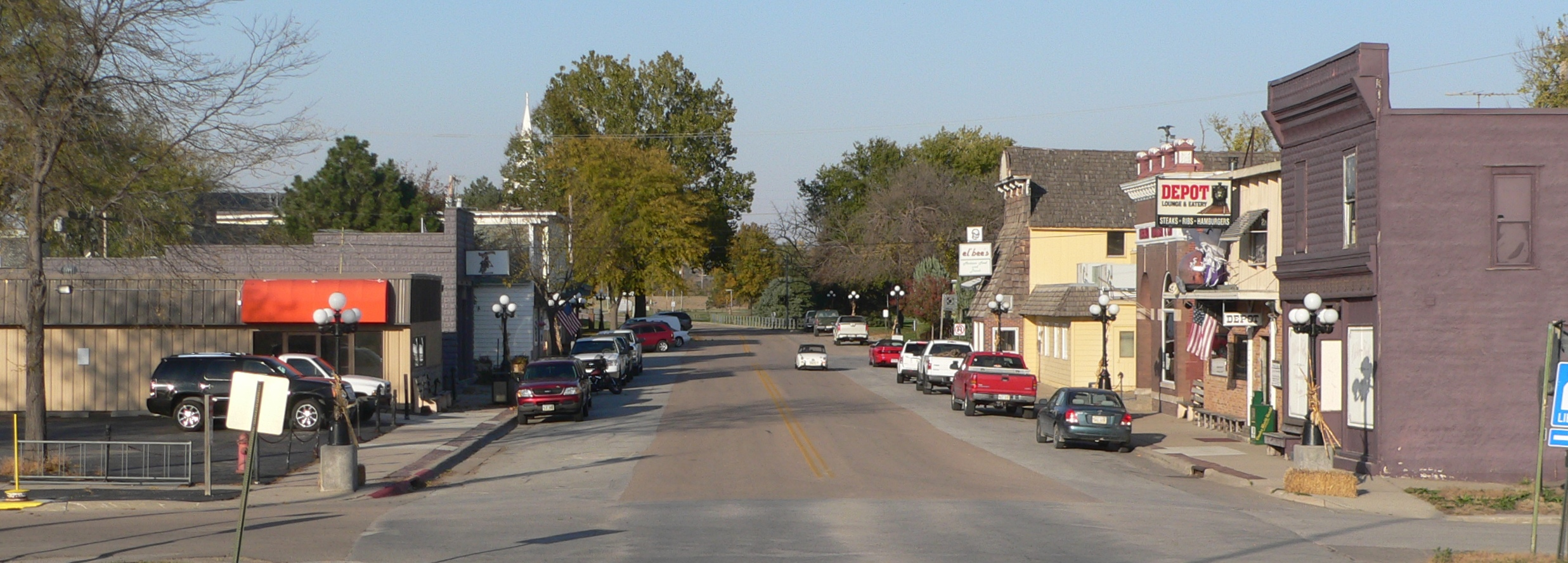
Dennys Rodriguez was arrested on a highway near Waterloo, Nebraska (pictured).

=== Trial and appeal to Eighth Circuit ===
On May 22, 2012, Rodriguez was indicted in the United States District Court for the District of Nebraska for possession with intent to distribute methamphetamine. Rodriguez filed a motion to suppress evidence discovered by the drug detection dog, arguing that an officer may not extend an already completed traffic stop to conduct a canine sniff without reasonable suspicion or other lawful justification. However, the district court denied the motion. On January 17, 2013, Rodriguez filed an appeal in the United States Court of Appeals for the Eighth Circuit to review the denial of his motion to suppress. On January 31, 2014, the Eighth Circuit Court of Appeals affirmed the district court's decision to deny Rodriguez's motion to suppress the evidence. The Eighth Circuit held that a seven- to eight-minute detention was de minimis and reasonable to ensure officer safety. Rodriguez appealed this decision to the Supreme Court of the United States, which granted certiorari on October 2, 2014.

== Opinion of the Court ==
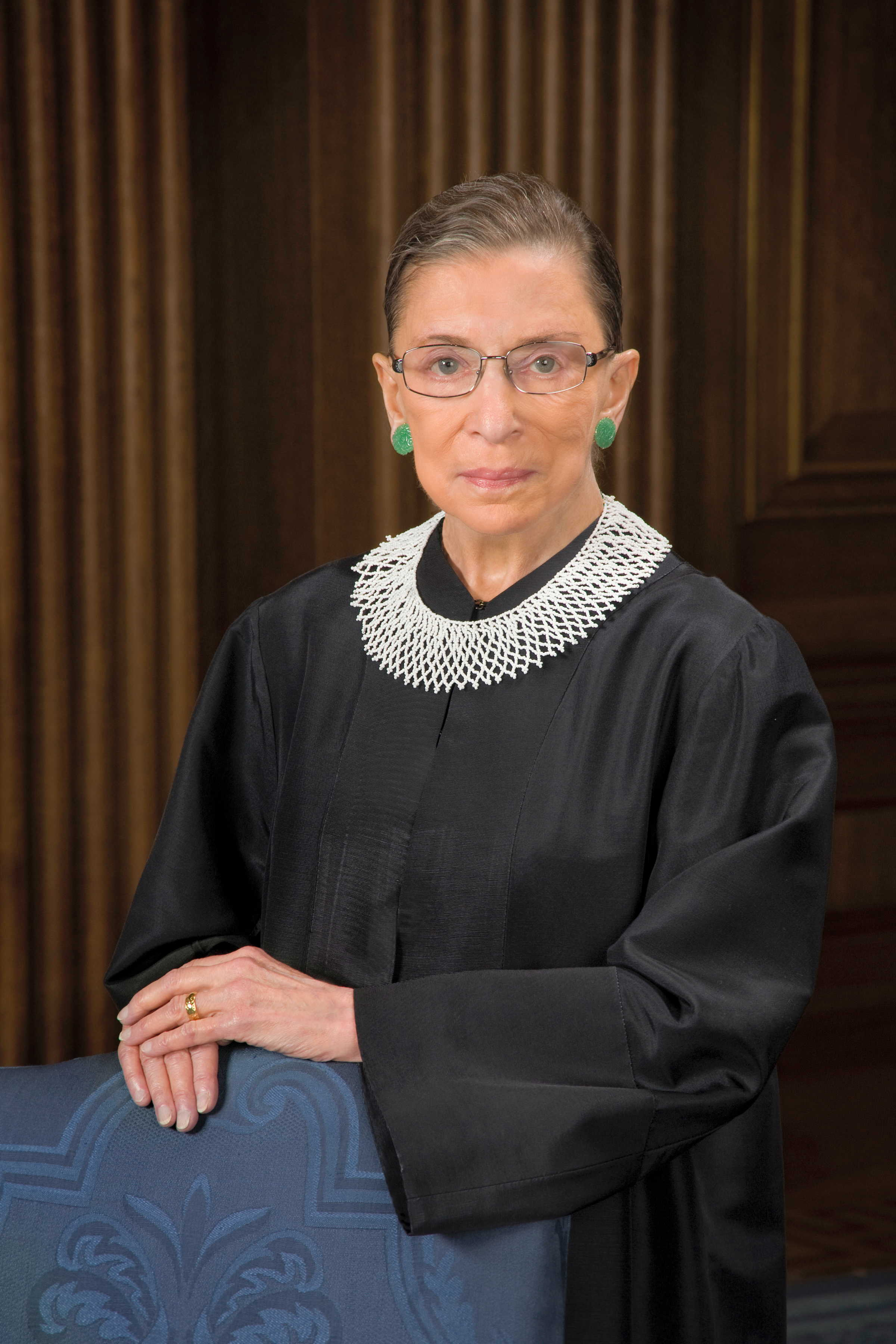
In her majority opinion, Justice Ruth Bader Ginsburg (pictured) held that "a dog sniff is not fairly characterized as part of the officer’s traffic mission".

Writing for a majority of the Court, Justice Ruth Bader Ginsburg held that "a police stop exceeding the time needed to handle the matter for which the stop was made violates the Constitution’s shield against unreasonable seizures". Consequently, a traffic stop becomes unlawful if "it is prolonged beyond the time reasonably required to complete the mission of issuing a ticket for the violation". Justice Ginsburg wrote that the purpose of the initial stop in this case was to investigate why Rodriguez swerved out of his lane of traffic. Therefore, the officer's authority to continue the stop ended once he completed his investigation of that infraction. Because the dog sniff was unrelated to the investigation of the original traffic infraction, the officer should not have extended the stop absent "independently supported reasonable suspicion" for the dog sniff. The Court then remanded the case to the Eighth Circuit to determine whether the officer did, in fact, have an independent basis for conducting the dog sniff.

=== Dissenting opinions ===
Justice Anthony Kennedy, Justice Clarence Thomas, and Justice Samuel Alito each wrote a dissenting opinion. Justice Thomas argued that the brief extension to conduct a dog sniff was reasonable and that "conducting a dog sniff does not change the character of a traffic stop that is lawful at its inception and otherwise executed in a reasonable manner", He also argued that the dog sniff was independently justified by the officer's reasonable suspicion that Rodriguez and his passenger were engaged in criminal activity. In a one-paragraph dissenting opinion, Justice Kennedy wrote that he agreed with all of Justice Thomas' opinion, except his conclusion that the officer had reasonable suspicion. Because the Eighth Circuit did not address the question of whether the officer had reasonable suspicion, he argued "the better course would be to allow that court to do so in the first instance". Justice Alito wrote a dissent in which he characterized the majority opinion as "unnecessary, impractical, and arbitrary". He argued that the dog sniff was justified because the facts of the case "easily meet our standard for reasonable suspicion". Justice Alito also criticized Justice Ginsburg's opinion for ignoring concerns of officer safety, and that the occupants of the car may have attacked the officer if he conducted the dog sniff before backup arrived. Additionally, Justice Alito claimed it was "arbitrary" for the court to hold the Fourth Amendment was violated "simply because of the sequence in which Officer Struble chose to perform his tasks".

== Afterward ==
On remand, the Eighth Circuit ruled that because the police could rely in good faith on binding precedent from the Eighth Circuit, which at the time of the stop held that briefly prolonging a stop was legal, Rodriguez was entitled to no relief. The United States Supreme Court declined to hear an appeal of that decision.

== Commentary and analysis ==
Have you ever accidentally knocked something over and then embarrassedly just walked away rather than helping to clean it up, hoping that no one noticed? Sometimes the Supreme Court corrects its own mistakes this way – not overruling, but just quietly and slowly walking away, over years and various decisions, from a rationale that increasingly seems mistaken.

— Rory Little, Professor of Law, suggesting that the Court attempted to distance itself from prior rulings

Commentators have observed that Rodriguez represents a significant departure from the Court's prior dog sniff cases and that the Court's "view of the canine sniff investigatory technique is evolving". One analyst suggested the Court "is quietly distancing itself from its decision three decades ago in United States v. Place," where the Court held that a dog sniff is not a search under the Fourth Amendment. Other commentators praised the case for "strengthening" and "reinvigorating" constitutional protections against unreasonable searches and seizures. However, Nina Totenberg of National Public Radio observed that despite the Supreme Court's favorable ruling, Rodriguez "is not free of legal trouble yet" because the Eighth Circuit may, and ultimately did, rule the dog sniff was permissible.

Some analysts have also suggested that the Court's opinion was influenced by ongoing protests in Ferguson, Missouri. One commentator suggested the court's decision may have been shaped, in part, by recent high-profile "killings of black men by police" and that the Court's opinion was "affected by changing social attitudes" about the role of police in society. Another suggested that Chief Justice John Roberts may have been influenced by the shooting of Michael Brown and that he "learned the lessons of Ferguson and is trading in his logical abstractions for some much-needed legal realism".

== See also ==
- Consent search
- Driving while black
- Fourth Amendment to the United States Constitution
- List of United States Supreme Court cases
- List of United States Supreme Court cases, volume 575
- Florida v. Harris (2013)
- Florida v. Jardines (2013)
- Illinois v. Caballes (2005)
- Stop-and-frisk in New York City
- Terry stop, a phrase taken from the holding in Terry v. Ohio
- Virginia v. Moore
- United States v. Place (1983)
