= BankAmerica Corp. v. United States =

BankAmerica Corp v. United States
- Supreme Court of the United States

Argued January 19, 1983 Decided June 8, 1983
- Full case name: BankAmerica Corp. v. United States
- Docket no.: 81-1487
- Citations: 462 U.S. 122 (more)
- Argument: Oral argument

Court membership
- Chief Justice Warren E. Burger Associate Justices William J. Brennan Jr. · Byron White; Thurgood Marshall · Harry Blackmun; Lewis F. Powell Jr. · William Rehnquist; John P. Stevens · Sandra Day O'Connor

Case opinions
- Majority: Burger, joined by Blackmun, Rehnquist, Stevens, O'Connor
- Dissent: White, joined by Brennan, Marshall
- Powell took no part in the consideration or decision of the case.

BankAmerica Corp v. United States, 462 U.S. 122 (1983) began in 1975. This is a landmark antitrust case which interprets Section 8 of the Clayton Act. The United States government brought test cases against three separate banks along with their parent holding companies, including mutual life insurance firms. The case also involved individuals who sat on the boards at both institutions. The case was decided by a 7–2 majority, with the Supreme Court reversing the Ninth Circuit. The defendants did not admit guilty.

This case is an antitrust case that was filed by the U.S. Department of Justice. The Department of Justice claimed there were violations of the Clayton Act (Section 8), which prohibits individuals from serving on the boards of corporations that are separate and competing. The Department of Justice claimed that not one, but several executives had held director positions at several large banking corporations, thereby minimizing the competition. The case was solved by a consent judgment, which required individuals to withdraw and resign from their competing board positions in order to resolve the conflict and eliminate the overlap.

== Background ==
BankAmerica Corp v. United States began in the mid-1970s and was later resolved in the 1980s. The United States government filed an Antitrust lawsuit against BankAmerica Corporation and Security Pacific National Bank, two of the major financial institutions at the time. The U.S. government claimed that a proposed merger between the two institutions would violate Section 7 of the Clayton Act. The Clayton prohibits any mergers that create less competition or lead to monopolies. Instead of a trial taking place, both parties agreed to enter a consent decree. Bank of America abandoned the merger and then was allowed to proceed with limited activities under certain restrictions. In exchange, the U.S. government released all the civil claims that arose from the proposed merger.

== Argument ==
The federal government had filed a lawsuit for monetary damages while interpreting the Clayton Act that went against the proposed merger from the 1960s. The government claimed the merger had cause financial harm and created damages to other competitors.

There was a legal issue as to whether the decree, which had been previously settled, also applied to this new claim for damages. The government argued that the decree applied only to equitable claims and not legal claims, including monetary damages.

BankAmerica Corp. argued that the broad language of the decree included damage claims not only requests for injunctive relief.

== No consent decree ==
The Department of Justice (DOJ) brought forward a formal civil enforcement actions under Section 8 of the Clayton Act. The defendants, including BankAmerica and the other financial corporations involved, did not settle through a consent decree, ultimately leading to a Supreme Court ruling.

== Procedural facts ==
There were three stages in the procedure of this case. First, in the District Court, this involved a summary judgment for petitioners. In its conclusion, no consent decree was contemplated. The District Court agreed with BankAmerica and then dismissed the government's claims regarding damages on the grounds that the case had been settled. Then, the Ninth Circuit Court of Appeals reversed and claimed the decree addressed only equitable claims and not damages, including the holding that "the claim for damages was not barred." The Supreme Court review thereafter followed, and the case raised important questions about the scope of settlements and government accountability.

== Supreme Court ruling ==
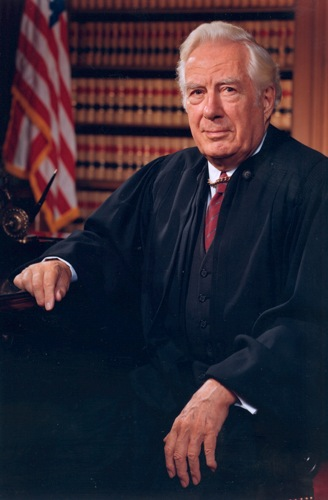
Chief Justice, Warren E. Burger, authored the majority opinion of the Court.

The case was ruled by a 7–2 majority, with the Supreme Court reversing the Ninth Circuit. Chief Justice Warren E. Burger delivered the opinion for the Court. It involved the central question of Section 8 of the Clayton Act, prohibiting interlocking directors between a bank and a competitor (non-banking) corporation.

The court emphasized that the language was unambiguous, referring to the statutory language: "Two or more corporations...other than banks." This meant that it excludes the interlock when it involves a bank.

The Supreme Court decided that Section 8 does not apply to “interlocking directorates when one of the corporations is a bank."

== Significance ==
This ruling clarifies the binding nature of consent decrees. Once the government agrees to release all civil claims, both equitable and legal, unless stated otherwise. This establishes a precedent for interpreting further release clauses involving broad language. The case serves as a warning and sets standards for other corporations in similar markets.

This set a legal precedent, as the ruling clarified that consent decrees with broad language can release equitable and legal claims, including monetary damages. This decision reinforced the principle that courts must enforce the plain terms of settlements unless they are limited.

BankAmerica Corp. v. United States interpreted Section 8 of the Clayton Act. It set clear boundaries and confirmed that interlocking directorates involving banks are not covered by the statute. This has shaped enforcement policy and continues to influence corporate structuring.

This case also serves as a cautionary example for corporations dealing with government enforcement, specifically in industries where competition may overlap with regulations.
