= Illinois v. Caballes =

- Supreme Court of the United States

Argued November 10, 2004 Decided January 24, 2005
- Full case name: Illinois, Petitioner v. Roy I. Caballes
- Citations: 543 U.S. 405 (more) 125 S. Ct. 834; 160 L. Ed. 2d 842; 2005 U.S. LEXIS 769; 73 U.S.L.W. 4111; 18 Fla. L. Weekly Fed. S 100

Case history
- Prior: People v. Caballes, 207 Ill. 2d 504, 802 N.E.2d 202, 280 Ill. Dec. 277 (2003); cert. granted, 541 U.S. 972 (2004).
- Subsequent: Judgment affirmed on remand, People v. Caballes, 221 Ill. 2d 282, 303 Ill. Dec. 128, 851 N.E.2d 26 (2006).

Holding
- A dog sniff conducted during a concededly lawful traffic stop that reveals no information other than the location of a substance that no individual has any right to possess does not violate the Fourth Amendment.

Court membership
- Chief Justice William Rehnquist Associate Justices John P. Stevens · Sandra Day O'Connor; Antonin Scalia · Anthony Kennedy; David Souter · Clarence Thomas; Ruth Bader Ginsburg · Stephen Breyer

Case opinions
- Majority: Stevens, joined by O'Connor, Scalia, Kennedy, Thomas, Breyer
- Dissent: Souter
- Dissent: Ginsburg, joined by Souter
- Rehnquist took no part in the consideration or decision of the case.

Laws applied
- U.S. Const. amend. IV

Illinois v. Caballes, 543 U.S. 405 (2005), is a decision by the Supreme Court of the United States in which the Court held that the use of a drug-sniffing police dog during a routine traffic stop does not violate the Fourth Amendment to the U.S. Constitution, even if the initial infraction is unrelated to drug offenses.

In the case, Illinois native Roy Caballes was stopped by a state police officer for speeding on an interstate highway. As the officer was writing the ticket, another officer arrived on the scene, who walked a drug-sniffing police dog around Caballes's car. The dog alerted to the odor of narcotics at the trunk of the car, which the police opened and found marijuana. Caballes was charged with narcotics trafficking, but tried to suppress the evidence found by the police dog, arguing that the use of the dog violated the Fourth Amendment's prohibition of unreasonable search and seizure because the officers did not have a warrant to search his car.

Justice John Paul Stevens wrote for the six-justice majority that it was not an overstep of police power to use a police dog during a routine traffic stop, because a well trained police dog will only alert to the presence of illegal substances that no citizen has the right to possess. Chief Justice William Rehnquist took no part in the consideration of this case, and did not author an opinion. The ruling relied on a previous decision, United States v. Place (1983), in which the Court upheld the constitutionality of police dog searches, and affirmed that police do not have to have reasonable suspicion to bring a canine near a person's belongings in a public place. In response to Caballes, the Court clarified in Rodriguez v. United States (2015) that an officer may not unreasonably prolong the duration of a traffic stop to conduct a dog sniff.

== Background ==
=== Prior case law ===
The Fourth Amendment to the United States Constitution protects against unreasonable searches and seizures by the federal government and its officials, such as police officers. Officers cannot conduct a search without probable cause and in most cases must obtain a search warrant before proceeding. In some cases, however, officers may conduct a limited search without a warrant. In United States v. Place (1983), the Court ruled that a canine sniff of a person's property by a trained detection dog does not constitute a "search" within the meaning of the Fourth Amendment.

=== Facts of the case ===
On November 12, 1998, Illinois state trooper Daniel Gillette stopped Roy Caballes for speeding on Interstate 80 as it passed through LaSalle County. Gillette reported the stop by radio to his precinct's dispatcher as he approached Caballes's car. Another trooper, Craig Graham of the State Drug Interdiction Team, overheard the transmissions and informed the dispatcher he would meet up with Gillette to conduct a canine sniff on Caballes's car. (Note: Although Gillette did not ask for Graham's assistance, he did "expect him to show up" after Graham said he would.) Gillette brought Caballes into his squad car and asked for consent to search his vehicle, which Caballes refused. Gillette asked the dispatcher to confirm the validity of Caballes's license and check for active warrants. While waiting for the results, Gillette "engaged Caballes in conversation", asking him where he was going and why he was dressed up. Gillette noticed inconsistencies in Caballes's story and considered his nervousness "unusual", but had no reason to continue the investigation.

Graham arrived on the scene as Gillette was writing a warning ticket for speeding. Graham walked his drug-sniffing dog around Caballes's car, where the dog alerted at the trunk to the presence of illegal narcotics in less than a minute. Upon searching the trunk, officers found marijuana with a street value of over $250,000. The entire incident lasted less than ten minutes.

=== Lower court proceedings ===
After unsuccessfully moving to suppress the marijuana evidence before trial, Caballes was convicted of narcotics trafficking and sentenced to 12 years in prison and a $256,136 fine. The trial judge denied Caballes' motion to suppress, reasoning that the officers had not unnecessarily prolonged the traffic stop, and the indication by the dog, of narcotics in the vehicle, gave them probable cause to search the trunk of Caballes' car. The Appellate Court of Illinois affirmed, but the Illinois Supreme Court reversed, holding that because the dog sniff was performed without reference to specific and articulable facts, it unjustifiably enlarged the scope of the stop into a drug investigation. The Supreme Court granted certiorari to the case in order to answer the question of whether the Fourth Amendment requires reasonable suspicion to justify using a drug-sniffing dog during a routine and otherwise legitimate traffic stop.

== Opinion of the Court ==
The Fourth Amendment guards against "unreasonable searches and seizures". Under the Court's Fourth Amendment jurisprudence, a traffic stop is a "seizure," and requires reasonable suspicion that the driver of the vehicle has violated a traffic law. In this case, it was undisputed that Caballes was speeding. Thus, the traffic stop by itself was lawful from the start.

However, a seizure that is justified at its inception may become unreasonable if it is unreasonably prolonged in duration. Thus, if the sole reason for the stop is to issue a warning to the motorist, the stop becomes unreasonable if it is prolonged beyond the time reasonably necessary to issue the warning. And if a drug-sniffing dog is used during this unreasonable extension, the use of the dog violates the Fourth Amendment. The Illinois Supreme Court reasoned that using the dog changed the character of the encounter from a routine traffic stop to a drug investigation, and that transformation had to be supported by reasonable suspicion. The Supreme Court instead reasoned that the dog sniff does not change the character of an encounter unless the dog sniff invaded any of the citizen's other reasonable expectations of privacy. The Court concluded it did not.

Official conduct that does not invade a reasonable expectation of privacy is not a "search" under the Fourth Amendment. The possession of contraband is not anything in which a person can have a legitimate expectation of privacy, since it is by definition illegal to possess contraband. In United States v. Place (1983), the Court had held that a dog sniff is sui generis because it discloses only the presence or absence of narcotics. By contrast, the information disclosed by the heat sensing device in Kyllo v. United States (2001) disclosed the "intimate details in a home, such as at what hour each night the lady of the house takes her daily sauna and bath". People have a reasonable expectation that such information will be kept private, whereas they have no such expectation in the fact they possessed contraband. Thus, the use of a drug-sniffing dog does not intrude upon any reasonable expectation of privacy, and it was not unreasonable for the Illinois police to use the dog during the time it took them to issue a warning to Caballes.

Caballes argued that it was wrong to assume that the alerts of drug-sniffing dogs reveal only information regarding the presence or absence of narcotics. But the Court rejected this argument because there was no information before the state courts to support it, and because he did not point to anything else in which a person has a reasonable expectation of privacy that a drug detection dog's alert might reveal.

== Dissenting opinions ==
=== Justice Souter's dissent ===
Justice Souter believed that the time had come to revisit the essential premise underpinning both the Court's opinion in United States v. Place and the majority's opinion in Caballes—that the sniff of a dog is infallible, and can reveal either the presence or absence of narcotics and nothing else. "The infallible dog, however, is a creature of legal fiction.... Their supposed infallibility is belied by judicial opinions describing well-trained animals sniffing and alerting with less than perfect accuracy, whether owing to errors by their handlers, the limitations of the dogs themselves, or even the pervasive contamination of currency by cocaine." Souter pointed to a study relied on by the State of Illinois in its reply brief, indicating that "dogs in artificial testing situations return false positives anywhere from 12.5% to 60% of the time, depending on the length of the search". If a dog is not infallible, then there is no logical basis for the sui generis rule underlying Place and Caballes, and every reason to investigate "the actual function that dog sniffs perform". Because the dogs are in the hands of government agents determined to discover evidence of crime, the dog sniff is the "first step in a process that may disclose intimate details without revealing contraband," and hence is a "search" within the meaning of the Fourth Amendment. In the context of a traffic stop, an additional search unrelated to the initial purpose of the stop requires reasonable suspicion. Since in this case the police did not have such suspicion, Justice Souter would have affirmed the decision of the Illinois Supreme Court.

=== Justice Ginsburg's dissent ===
Justice Ginsburg, joined by Justice Souter, focused on the long-standing connection in the Court's Fourth Amendment jurisprudence between a traffic stop and the stop-and-frisk authorized in Terry v. Ohio (1968). The scope of a Terry stop is not circumscribed merely by duration; the manner in which the stop is carried out must also be carefully controlled. Ginsburg would have applied this principle to the traffic stop in this case, and required reasonable suspicion for the police to transform the routine traffic stop into a more extensive search for drugs. The fact that a dog sniff is sui generis only matters if the sole determinant of what is "reasonable" is the length of time a traffic stop lasts. If the Court had recognized that traffic stops must be limited in what police are searching for as well as how long they take to conduct the search, the sui generis nature of dog sniffs would not have been dispositive of the case. "Under today's decision, every traffic stop could become an occasion to call in the dogs, to the distress and embarrassment of the law-abiding population.... Today's decision clears the way for suspicionless, dog-accompanied drug sweeps of parked cars along sidewalks and in parking lots.... Motorists [would not] have constitutional grounds for complaint should police with dogs, stationed at long traffic lights, circle cars waiting for the red signal to turn green."

== See also ==
- United States v. Place, 462 U.S. 696 (1983)
- Florida v. Harris, 568 U.S. 237 (2013)
- Florida v. Jardines, 569 U.S. 1 (2013)
- Rodriguez v. United States, 575 U.S. 348 (2015)
