= Florida v. Jardines =

- Supreme Court of the United States

Argued October 31, 2012 Decided March 26, 2013
- Full case name: State of Florida, Petitioner v. Joelis Jardines, Respondent
- Docket no.: 11-564
- Citations: 569 U.S. 1 (more) 133 S. Ct. 1409; 185 L. Ed. 2d 495; 2013 U.S. LEXIS 2542; 81 U.S.L.W. 4209

Case history
- Prior: evid. suppressed at trial; reversed, 9 So.3d 1 (Fla. 3d DCA 2008); quashed, 73 So.3d 34, (Fla. S. Ct. 2011); rehearing denied, unpubl. order, (Fla. S. Ct. 2011); cert. granted, 565 U.S. 1104 (2012).

Holding
- The government's use of trained police dogs to investigate the home and its immediate surroundings is a "search" within the meaning of the Fourth Amendment.

Court membership
- Chief Justice John Roberts Associate Justices Antonin Scalia · Anthony Kennedy; Clarence Thomas · Ruth Bader Ginsburg; Stephen Breyer · Samuel Alito; Sonia Sotomayor · Elena Kagan

Case opinions
- Majority: Scalia, joined by Thomas, Ginsburg, Sotomayor, Kagan
- Concurrence: Kagan, joined by Ginsburg, Sotomayor
- Dissent: Alito, joined by Roberts, Kennedy, Breyer

Laws applied
- U.S. Const. amend. IV

Florida v. Jardines, 569 U.S. 1 (2013), is a Supreme Court of the United States case that ruled that police use of a trained detection dog to sniff for narcotics on the front porch of a private home is a "search" within the meaning of the Fourth Amendment to the United States Constitution, and therefore, without consent, requires both probable cause and a search warrant.

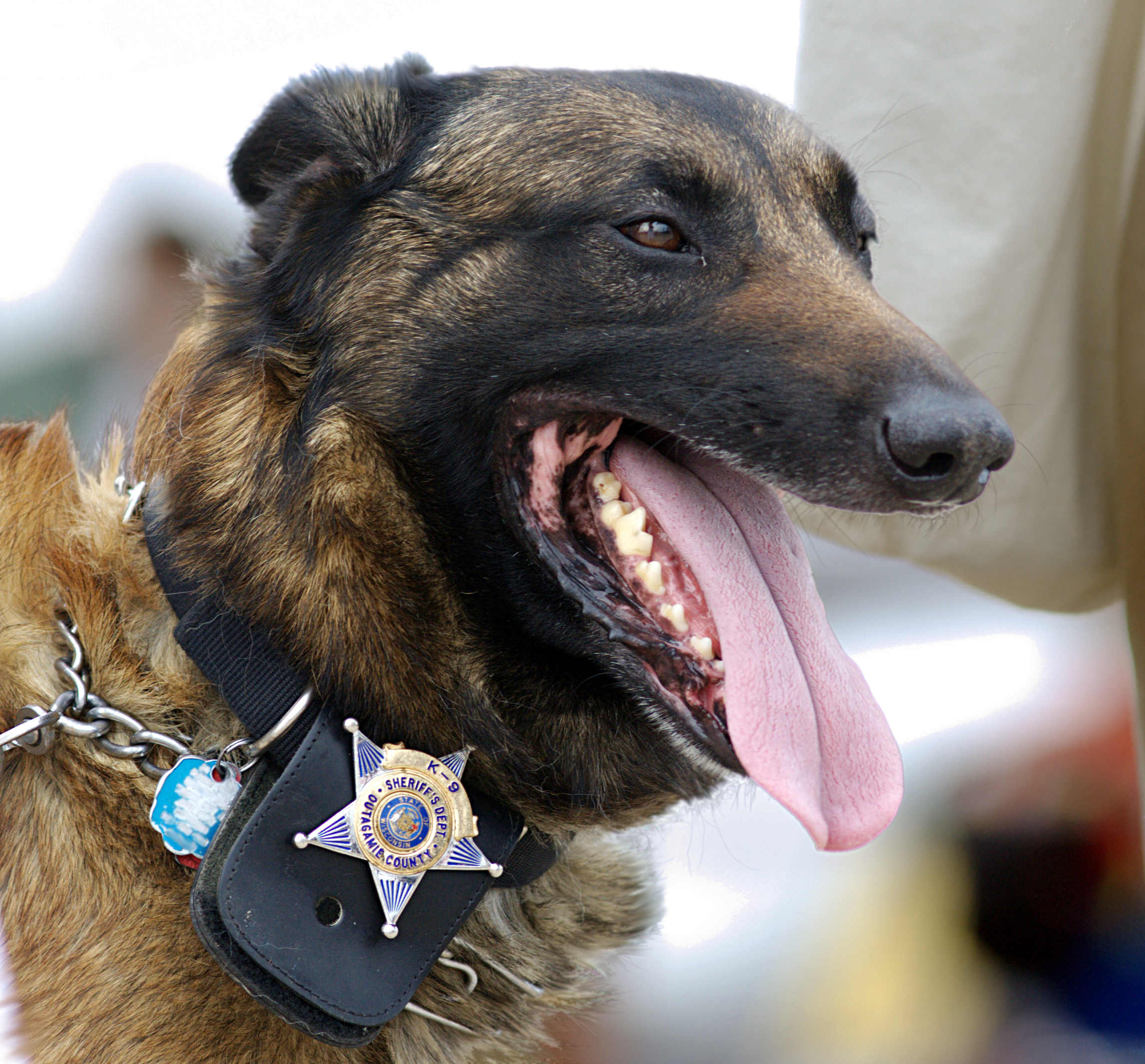
Police dog

In 2006, police in Miami, Florida received an anonymous tip that a home was being used as a marijuana grow house. They led a drug-sniffing police dog to the front door of the home, and the dog alerted at the front door to the scent of contraband. A search warrant was issued, which led to the arrest of the homeowner.

Twenty-seven U.S. states and the federal government, among other parties, had supported Florida's argument that the use of a police dog was an acceptable form of minimally invasive warrantless search. In a 5–4 decision, the Court disagreed, despite three previous cases in which the Court had held that a dog sniff was not a search when deployed against luggage at an airport, against vehicles in a drug interdiction checkpoint and against vehicles during routine traffic stops. The Court made clear by this ruling that it considered the deployment of a police dog at the front door of a private residence to be a separate type of situation.

== Background ==
On November 3, 2006, an anonymous, unverified tip was given to the Miami-Dade Police Department through its crime-reporting tip line indicating that the residence of Joelis Jardines was being used as a marijuana grow house. About a month later, on December 6, 2006, two detectives and a drug-detection dog approached the residence while other officers of the Miami-Dade Police Department established perimeter positions around the residence, with agents of the Drug Enforcement Administration (DEA) in standby positions as backup units.

As summarized by the written opinion of the Florida Third District Court of Appeal:

... the detective went to the home at 7 a.m. He watched the home for fifteen minutes. There were no vehicles in the driveway, the blinds were closed, and there was no observable activity.

After fifteen minutes, the dog handler arrived with the drug-detection dog. The handler placed the dog on a leash and accompanied the dog up to the front door of the home. The dog alerted to the scent of contraband.

The handler told the detective that the dog had a positive alert for the odor of narcotics. The detective went up to the front door for the first time, and smelled marijuana. ... The detective prepared an affidavit and applied for a search warrant, which was issued. A search was conducted, which confirmed that marijuana was being grown inside the home. The defendant was arrested.

While the Miami-Dade narcotics detective was away from the scene in order to secure the search warrant, DEA agents remained behind to maintain surveillance of Jardines' home. The search warrant was secured about an hour later and was executed by officers from both agencies. The defendant was apprehended by a DEA agent as he attempted to flee through the rear door of the residence.

== Lower courts ==
Initially, the trial court granted the defendant's motion to suppress evidence that was obtained from his home, citing the authority of State of Florida v. Rabb. The state appealed that decision to suppress, and the Florida Third District Court of Appeal (DCA) reversed, while certifying a conflict with the earlier Rabb decision. Summarizing their reasoning, the DCA stated:

We do so because, first, a canine sniff is not a Fourth Amendment search; second, the officer and the dog were lawfully present at the defendant's front door; and third, the evidence seized would inevitably have been discovered.

The foundation for the principle that a canine sniff is not a Fourth Amendment search was derived from the Supreme Court's previous dog-sniff cases.

Jardines sought review in the Supreme Court of Florida based on the Rabb conflict. In a 5–2 decision rendered on April 14, 2011, the court sided with Jardines, ruling:

"We have said that the Fourth Amendment draws 'a firm line at the entrance to the house.' That line, we think, must be not only firm but also bright — which requires clear specification of those methods of surveillance that require a warrant." Given the special status accorded a citizen's home in Anglo-American jurisprudence, we hold that the warrantless "sniff test" that was conducted at the front door of the residence in the present case was an unreasonable government intrusion into the sanctity of the home and violated the Fourth Amendment. We quash the decision in Jardines and approve the result in Rabb.

The state filed a motion for rehearing, which the Supreme Court of Florida denied on July 7, 2011.

=== Previous dog-sniff cases ===
In its written opinion, the Supreme Court of Florida referenced and analyzed the only three dog-sniff cases to have been heard by the Supreme Court of the United States. In the first, United States v. Place (1983), the Court answered the question of whether police, based on reasonable suspicion, could temporarily seize a piece of luggage at an airport and then subject the luggage to a sniff test by a drug-detection dog. After the defendant's behavior at an airport attracted suspicion, police seized his luggage and subjected it to a sniff test, discovering cocaine inside. The Supreme Court concluded that the seizure, which lasted 90 minutes, was an impermissibly long Terry stop, but with respect to the dog sniff, the Court said that:

[A] canine sniff ... does not require opening the luggage. It does not expose noncontraband items that otherwise would remain hidden from public view, as does, for example, an officer's rummaging through the contents of the luggage. Thus, the manner ... is much less intrusive than a typical search. Moreover, the sniff discloses only the presence or absence of narcotics, a contra-band item. ... This limited disclosure also ensures that the owner of the property is not subjected to the embarrassment and inconvenience entailed in less discriminate and more intrusive investigative methods. In these respects, the canine sniff is sui generis. We are aware of no other investigative procedure that is so limited both in the manner in which the information is obtained and in the content of the information revealed by the procedure. Therefore, we conclude that the ... exposure of respondent's luggage, which was located in a public place, to a trained canine – did not constitute a "search" within the meaning of the Fourth Amendment. (emphasis added)

Next, in City of Indianapolis v. Edmond (2000), the Supreme Court examined whether police could stop vehicles at a dragnet-style drug-interdiction checkpoint and subject each vehicle to a sniff test around the vehicle's exterior by a drug-detection dog. The Court ruled that the vehicle checkpoint itself was an impermissible seizure, but as to whether the dog sniff was a search, however, the Court again held that:

The fact that officers walk a narcotics-detection dog around the exterior of each car at the Indianapolis checkpoints does not transform the seizure into a search.

In the third case, Illinois v. Caballes (2005), the Supreme Court ruled that a minimally intrusive warrantless dog sniff of a vehicle was permissible at routine traffic stops, concluding:

A dog sniff conducted during a concededly lawful traffic stop that reveals no information other than the location of a substance that no individual has any right to possess does not violate the Fourth Amendment.

This conclusion, which upheld the constitutionality of certain minimally intrusive warrantless searches, was based on the premise that the vehicle has already been legally seized, albeit only temporarily, during a traffic stop, that police never entered the car and that both the vehicle and the police were on public property.

Consistent with previous rulings, the Court again maintained that an individual has no reasonable expectation of privacy while on public property, and that a dog sniff reveals only information about contraband.

=== Other relevant cases ===
The Supreme Court of Florida reviewed two additional Supreme Court cases related to the instant case. In United States v. Jacobsen (1984), the Court answered the question of whether police could temporarily seize and inspect a package without probable cause, because it had been damaged in transit and had white powder spilling from within that was found to be cocaine. Again, it was considered not to be a search under the Fourth Amendment:

Congress has decided ... to treat the interest in "privately" possessing cocaine as illegitimate; thus governmental conduct that can reveal whether a substance is cocaine, and no other arguably "private" fact, compromises no legitimate privacy interest. ... Here, as in Place, the likelihood that official conduct of the kind disclosed by the record will actually compromise any legitimate interest in privacy seems much too remote to characterize the testing as a search subject to the Fourth Amendment.

The other related case was Kyllo v. United States (2001), in which police had used a thermal-imaging device from a public vantage point to monitor the radiation of heat from a person's home, enabling them to identify the telltale heat signature from the lights used in the process of growing marijuana. The Court held that this use of "advanced technology" to learn private details about the inside of a person's home without a warrant was unconstitutional. The Court's decision on Caballes a few years later called into question certain aspects of Kyllo, but Justice Stevens distinguished Caballes from Kyllo in this passage:

Critical to [the Kyllo] decision was the fact that the device was capable of detecting lawful activity—in that case, intimate details in a home, such as "at what hour each night the lady of the house takes her daily sauna and bath." The legitimate expectation that information about perfectly lawful activity will remain private is categorically distinguishable from respondent's hopes or expectations concerning the nondetection of contraband in the trunk of his car. A dog sniff conducted during a concededly lawful traffic stop that reveals no information other than the location of a substance that no individual has any right to possess does not violate the Fourth Amendment.

=== Dog sniff at a private residence ===
In its analysis of these cases, the Supreme Court of Florida drew a clear distinction with respect to a dog-sniff test that was not conducted against a vehicle, but against a private residence:

Significantly, all the sniff and field tests in the above cases were conducted in a minimally intrusive manner upon objects—luggage at an airport in Place, vehicles on the roadside in Edmond and Caballes, and a package in transit in Jacobsen—that warrant no special protection under the Fourth Amendment. All the tests were conducted in an impersonal manner that subjected the defendants to no untoward level of public opprobrium, humiliation or embarrassment. ... Further, and more important, under the particular circumstances of each of the above cases, the tests were not susceptible to being employed in a discriminatory or arbitrary manner ... and there was no evidence of overbearing or harassing government conduct. There was no need for Fourth Amendment protection. As explained below, however, such is not the case with respect to a dog "sniff test" conducted at a private residence. ...

Although police generally may initiate a "knock and talk" encounter at the front door of a private residence without any prior showing of wrongdoing, ... a dog "sniff test" is a qualitatively different matter. Contrary to popular belief, a "sniff test" conducted at a private residence is not necessarily a casual affair in which a canine officer and dog approach the front door and the dog then performs a subtle "sniff test" and signals an "alert" if drugs are detected. Quite the contrary. In the present case, for instance, ... The "sniff test" conducted by the dog handler and his dog was a vigorous and intensive procedure. ...

Such a public spectacle unfolding in a residential neighborhood will invariably entail a degree of public opprobrium, humiliation and embarrassment for the resident, whether or not he or she is present at the time of the search, for such dramatic government activity in the eyes of many—neighbors, passers-by, and the public at large—will be viewed as an official accusation of crime. ...

Further, all the underlying circumstances that were present in the above federal "dog sniff" and "field test" cases that guaranteed objective, uniform application of those tests ... are absent from a warrantless "sniff test" conducted at a private residence. Unlike the objects in those cases, a private residence is not susceptible to being seized beforehand based on objective criteria. Thus, if government agents can conduct a dog "sniff test" at a private residence without any prior evidentiary showing of wrongdoing, there is simply nothing to prevent the agents from applying the procedure in an arbitrary or discriminatory manner, or based on whim and fancy, at the home of any citizen.

— Supreme Court of Florida, Jardines v. State of Florida (2011)

In a separate concurrence, joined by two other justices, Judge Lewis went a step further:

We as Americans have an unwavering expectation that there will not be someone, or something, sniffing into every crack, crevice, window, or chimney of our homes. We especially do not expect strangers to bring dogs onto or into our private front porches to sniff under our front doors or any of the cracks or crevices of our homes. This protected interest of the expectation of privacy will be obliterated if a single individual, manipulating an animal, is permitted to make the final determination as to whether the government should enter into a private residence based upon an unverified, uncorroborated, anonymous tip. To sanction and approve turning the "dogs loose" on the homes of Florida citizens is the antithesis of freedom of private property and the expectation of privacy as we have known it and contrary to who we are as a free people.

== Supreme Court of the United States ==
=== Questions presented ===
On October 26, 2011, Florida petitioned the Supreme Court of the United States for a writ of certiorari, which was granted on January 6, 2012. The petition included the following questions of law:

I. Whether a dog sniff at the front door of a suspected grow house by a trained narcotics detection dog is a Fourth Amendment search requiring probable cause?
II. Whether the officers' conduct during the investigation of the grow house, including remaining outside the house awaiting a search warrant is, itself, a Fourth Amendment search?

The Supreme Court granted certiorari, but with the scope limited only to the first question as presented in the petition.

=== Amicus curiae ===
Briefs of amicus curiae were filed in support of the petitioner by:

- United States of America
- The states of Texas, Alabama, Alaska, Arizona, Arkansas, Colorado, Delaware, Hawaii, Idaho, Iowa, Kansas, Kentucky, Maine, Michigan, Nebraska, New Hampshire, New Mexico, Oregon, Pennsylvania, Rhode Island, South Dakota, Tennessee, Utah, Vermont, Virginia, Washington and Wisconsin
- National Police Canine Association and Police K-9 magazine
- Wayne County, Michigan

Briefs in support of the respondent were filed by:

- Rutherford Institute
- Cato Institute
- Fourth Amendment Scholars (52 college law professors)
- National Association of Criminal Defense Lawyers, et al.

=== Arguments ===
In each of the Supreme Court's prior dog-sniff cases, the Court's core belief that a dog sniff is sui generis and is only capable of detecting contraband substances has been the basis for concluding that a dog sniff did not constitute a "search" within the meaning of the Fourth Amendment. This fundamental assumption has remained largely unchallenged in any of the cases. One amicus brief directly challenged this assumption:

Scientific research now establishes that drug-detection dogs do not alert to the contraband itself. Instead, drug-detection dogs alert to certain volatile substances – generally, break-down products of the illegal drug. These decomposition odor constituents are in no way illegal or even unique to contraband. In fact, these volatile molecules or compounds are also found in substantial quantities in ordinary household items. Therefore, rather than detecting the contraband itself, a detection dog's alert to these entirely legal molecules or compounds instead produces an inference that contraband is also present. Because the canine-sniff technique relies on detection of noncontraband molecules and compounds within a home as the basis to infer that contraband is hidden inside, a canine drug-detection sniff is "capable of detecting lawful activity" within the home. Scientific research establishes that instead of smelling cocaine, drug-detection dogs alert to methyl benzoate – an odor shared by snapdragons, petunias, perfumes and food additives. Instead of smelling heroin, drug-detection dogs alert to acetic acid – an odor shared by vinegar and aspirin that is past its prime. Instead of smelling MDMA ("Ecstasy"), drug-detection dogs alert to piperonal – an odor shared by soap, perfume, food additives and even lice repellant. (citation omitted)

— Brief of amici curiae Fourth Amendment Scholars in support of respondent

In its petitioner's brief, the state of Florida argued that the lower court improperly relied on Kyllo and erred in equating the dog sniff with a search, in that:

- There was no physical intrusion or entry into the residence, and police have the right to approach a home's front door to "knock and talk" with the owner.
- "While a drug-detection dog may smell many different odors emanating from a source, it will convey only one thing: whether illegal drugs are present. ... and [it] reveals no private facts in the process."
- A dog is not a "device", nor is it the rapidly "advancing technology" that concerned the Kyllo court.
- "This Court has held repeatedly that a dog's sniff is not a Fourth Amendment search".

Oral arguments
Recording of oral arguments before the Supreme Court.

Oral arguments were heard on October 31, 2012, the same day as those of another "dog sniff" case, Florida v. Harris. That case focused on whether law enforcement's assertions that the dog is "trained" or "certified" is sufficient to establish probable cause for a search. The decision in Harris was delivered more than a month before that of Jardines.

=== Decision ===
On March 26, 2013, by a 5-4 margin, the Supreme Court held that the government's use of trained police dogs to investigate the home and its immediate surroundings is a "search" within the meaning of the Fourth Amendment, thus affirming the Supreme Court of Florida.

Justice Scalia wrote the majority opinion, joined by justices Thomas, Ginsburg, Sotomayor and Kagan. Justice Kagan also filed a concurring opinion, joined by Ginsburg and Sotomayor. Justice Alito wrote the dissenting opinion, joined by chief justice Roberts and justices Kennedy and Breyer.

In this instance, the Court did not divide along typical liberal-conservative ideologies. The typically conservative justices were evenly split, with Scalia and Thomas joining three of the four typically liberal justices on the majority. Breyer and Justice Kennedy, often the "swing vote" on cases determined along strict ideological lines, joined the minority in dissent.

==== Majority opinion ====
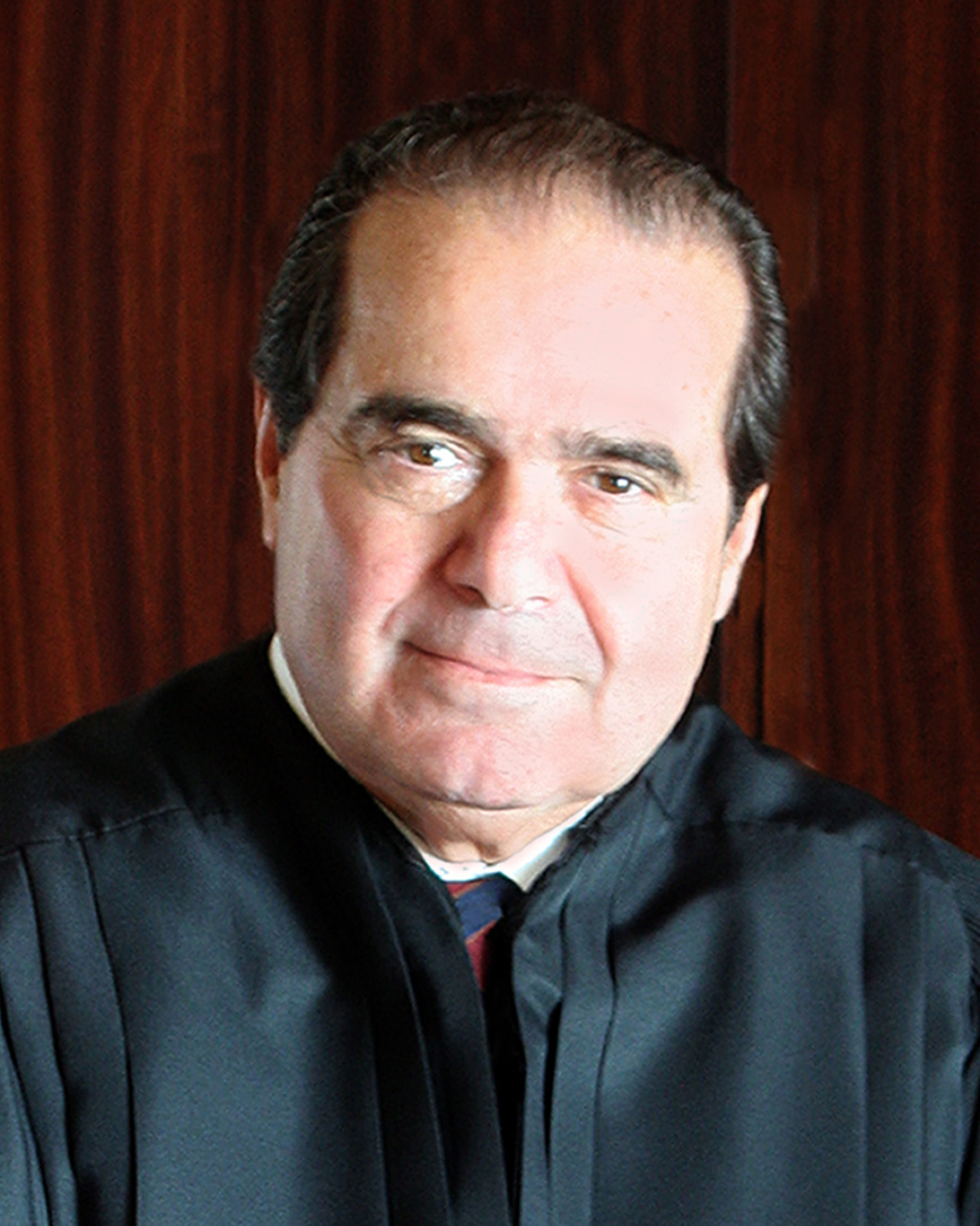
Justice Antonin Scalia delivered the majority opinion, joined by Kagan, Thomas, Ginsburg and Sotomayor.

Justice Scalia's majority opinion, joined by Kagan, Thomas, Ginsburg and Sotomayor, did not focus on the right to privacy, which is implicated by most modern-day Fourth Amendment cases. Rather, the decision hinged on the basis of a citizen's property rights. It followed the 2012 precedent from United States v. Jones that when police physically intrude on persons, houses, papers or effects for the purpose of obtaining information, "a 'search' within the original meaning of the Fourth Amendment" has "undoubtedly occurred." This conclusion is consistent with the Court's early Fourth Amendment jurisprudence, which until the latter half of the 20th century was tied to trespass under common law. At the Fourth Amendment's "very core", the Court said, stands "the right of a man to retreat into his own home and there be free from unreasonable governmental intrusion."

Scalia cited precedents as far back as 1765, from Entick v. Carrington, a case before England's Court of King's Bench, quoting, "[O]ur law holds the property of every man so sacred, that no man can set his foot upon his neighbour's close without his leave." He went on to say:

We therefore regard the area "immediately surrounding and associated with the home"—what our cases call the curtilage—as "part of the home itself for Fourth Amendment purposes." ... That principle has ancient and durable roots. Just as the distinction between the home and the open fields is "as old as the common law," ... so too is the identity of home and what Blackstone called the "curtilage or homestall," for the "house protects and privileges all its branches and appurtenants." ... This area around the home is "intimately linked to the home, both physically and psychologically," and is where "privacy expectations are most heightened."

The Court acknowledged that a doorbell or knocker is typically treated as an invitation, or license, to the public to approach the front door of the home to deliver mail, sell goods, solicit for charities, etc. This license extends to the police, who have the right to try engaging a home's occupant in a "knock and talk" for the purpose of gathering evidence without a warrant. However, the majority held:

This implicit license typically permits the visitor to approach the home by the front path, knock promptly, wait briefly to be received, and then (absent invitation to linger longer) leave. Complying with the terms of that traditional invitation does not require fine-grained legal knowledge; it is generally managed without incident by the Nation's Girl Scouts and trick-or-treaters.

Scalia used the analogies of a "visitor exploring the front path with a metal detector", or allowing police to "peer into the house through binoculars with impunity" to illustrate activities that are not implicitly licensed by the homeowner, which would constitute a trespass under common law. The Court concluded that bringing a police dog into the home's curtilage to perform a forensic exploration for incriminating evidence was therefore an unreasonable search, absent a warrant.

Having determined the unreasonableness of the search on the basis of property rights, the Court stated that it was unnecessary to address whether or not Jardines' right to privacy was also implicated.

==== Concurring opinion ====
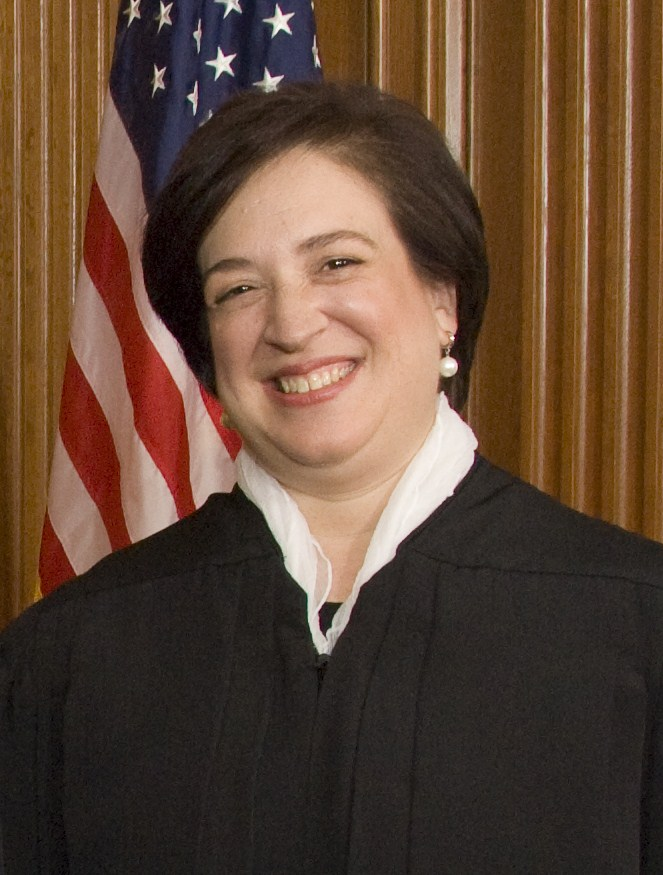
Justice Elena Kagan concurred, joined by Ginsburg and Sotomayor.

Justice Kagan, however, joined by Ginsburg and Sotomayor, expanded upon the binoculars example to argue further that both property and privacy rights are equally implicated:

A stranger comes to the front door of your home carrying super-high-powered binoculars. He doesn't knock or say hello. Instead, he stands on the porch and uses the binoculars to peer through your windows, into your home's furthest corners. ... Has your "visitor" trespassed on your property, exceeding the license you have granted to members of the public...? Yes, he has. And has he also invaded your "reasonable expectation of privacy"...? Yes, of course, he has done that too. That case is this case in every way that matters. (citations omitted)

The controlling case supporting this position is Kyllo v. United States, which involved a thermal-imaging device. Calling the drug-detection dog as a "super-sensitive instrument", Kagan argued that "[a drug-detection dog is] to the poodle down the street as high-powered binoculars are to a piece of plain glass. Like the binoculars, a drug-detection dog is a specialized device for discovering objects not in plain view (or plain smell)." It need not matter that the device is "animal, not mineral", crude or sophisticated, new technology or old, small or large. Where the device is not "in general public use," and is used against a home, it unreasonably violates a person's "minimal expectation of privacy".

==== Dissenting opinion ====
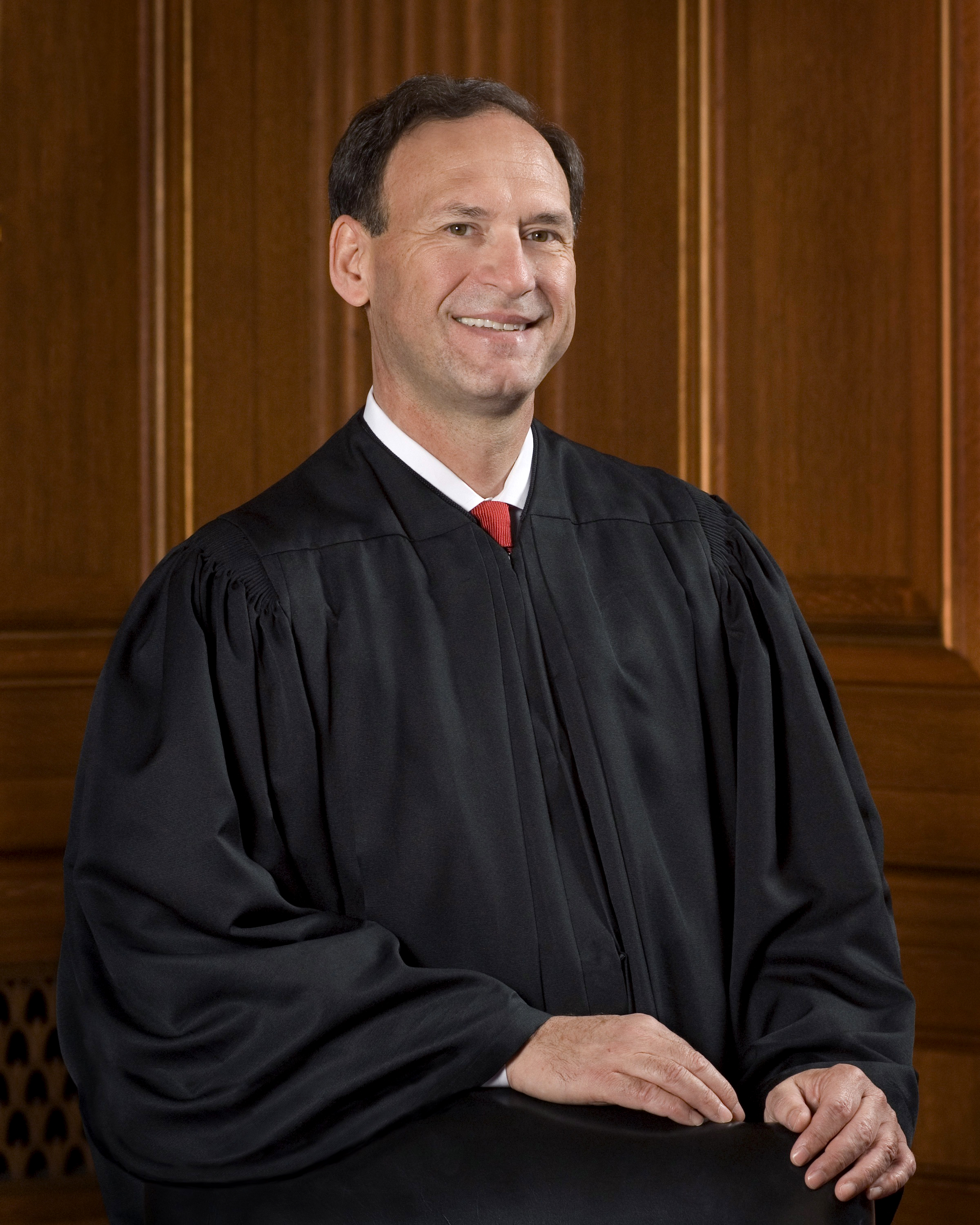
Justice Samuel Alito dissented, joined by Roberts, Kennedy and Breyer.

Justice Alito, joined by Roberts, Kennedy and Breyer, dissented, writing that the majority's decision is "based on a putative rule of trespass law that is nowhere to be found in the annals of Anglo-American jurisprudence". Alito instead argued that under the traditional laws of trespassing, visitors (including police officers) also are not considered trespassing if they "approach the door, pause long enough to see if someone is home, and (if not expressly invited to stay longer), leave ... a visitor who adheres to these limitations is not necessarily required to ring the doorbell, knock on the door, or attempt to speak with an occupant." In addition, an officer attempting a "knock and talk" may also "gather evidence by means other than talking. The officer may observe items in plain view and smell odors coming from the house." Alito also stated that detection dogs have been used for centuries, citing a 1318 Scottish law mentioning its use, and then wrote, "If bringing a tracking dog to the front door of a home constituted a trespass, one would expect at least one case to have arisen during the past 800 years. But the Court has found none."

Alito disagreed with the majority's opinion that a detection dog was analogous to a thermal-imaging device as per the Kyllo v. United States ruling. First, he argued that there should be no reasonable expectation of privacy if odors emanating from the inside reach outside to areas where people may lawfully stand. Secondly, unlike a thermal imaging device, he stated that a dog "is not a new form of 'technology' or a 'device'. And, as noted, the use of dogs' acute sense of smell in law enforcement dates back many centuries." Alito also noted that in the Kyllo case, police officers operated their thermal-imaging device while on a public street, and if that same standard were applied to a dog, he feared that it would not be able to be used to detect, for example, "explosives, or for a violent fugitive or kidnapped child" outside from a public sidewalk as well.

== See also ==
- Detection dog
- Police dog
- Florida v. Harris, 568 U.S. 237 (2013)
- Rodriguez v. United States, No. 13-9972, 575 U.S. ___ (2015)
- United States v. Place, 462 U.S. 696 (1983)
- City of Indianapolis v. Edmond, 531 U.S. 32 (2000)
- Illinois v. Caballes, 543 U.S. 405 (2005)
- Katz v. United States, 389 U.S. 347 (1967)
- Kyllo v. United States, 533 U.S. 27 (2001)
- United States v. Karo, 468 U.S. 705 (1984)
