= Oregon v. Bradshaw =

- Supreme Court of the United States

Argued March 28, 1983 Decided June 23, 1983
- Full case name: State of Oregon v. James Edward Bradshaw
- Citations: 462 U.S. 1039 (more) 103 S. Ct. 2830; 77 L. Ed. 2d 405

Case history
- Prior: Conviction reversed by the Oregon Court of Appeals, 636 P.2d 1011 (Or. Ct. App. 1981), cert. granted, 459 U.S. 966 (1982)

Holding
- Once a suspect invokes his rights under Miranda v. Arizona, the police may not initiate questioning until the suspect has an attorney present or voluntarily approaches the police with further questions beyond a "necessary inquiry arising out of the incidents of the custodial relationship."

Court membership
- Chief Justice Warren E. Burger Associate Justices William J. Brennan Jr. · Byron White; Thurgood Marshall · Harry Blackmun; Lewis F. Powell Jr. · William Rehnquist; John P. Stevens · Sandra Day O'Connor

Case opinions
- Plurality: Rehnquist, joined by Burger, White, O'Connor
- Concurrence: Powell
- Dissent: Marshall, joined by Brennan, Blackmun, Stevens

Laws applied
- U.S. Const. amend. V

Oregon v. Bradshaw, 462 U.S. 1039 (1983), was a United States Supreme Court case in which the court clarified the manner in which a suspect may waive his Miranda right under Miranda v. Arizona (1966) to have counsel present during interrogation by the police and applied the rule first announced in Edwards v. Arizona (1981).

== Facts ==
In September 1980, the police were investigating the death of minor Lowell Reynolds in a traffic accident in Tillamook County, Oregon. Defendant James Bradshaw was taken into custody and read the Miranda warnings. He then admitted giving Reynolds alcohol for a party at Reynolds' house but denied involvement in the accident. The police then arrested Bradshaw for furnishing liquor to a minor and again advised him of his rights. An officer stated that he believed that Bradshaw had been driving the truck in which Reynolds was killed, upon which Bradshaw again denied involvement in Reynolds's death and then stated "I do want an attorney before it goes very much further." The officer then ended the questioning.

Either just before or during Bradshaw's transfer to the county jail, he asked, "Well, what is going to happen to me now?" The officer reminded him that he had requested an attorney and did not have to speak unless he wished to do so, which Bradshaw said he understood. They then discussed where he was being taken and the offense with which he was to be charged, in the course of which the officer suggested his theory of how Bradshaw had caused Reynolds' death and then suggested that Bradshaw take a polygraph examination, to which Bradshaw agreed.

The next day, after again being read his Miranda rights and signing a written waiver, Bradshaw took a polygraph examination. At its conclusion, the examiner told Bradshaw that he did not believe that Bradshaw was telling the truth. Bradshaw then admitted that he had been driving the truck at the time of the accident.

=== Lower courts ===
The Oregon Court of Appeals concluded that Bradshaw had waived his right to counsel when he asked what would happen to him under the Supreme Court case Edwards v. Arizona (1981). In Edwards, the Supreme Court had held that "an accused, having expressed his desire to deal with the police only through counsel, is not subject to further interrogation by the authorities until counsel has been made available to him, unless the accused himself initiates further communication, exchanges, or conversations with the police."

== Supreme Court ==
=== Plurality ===
The plurality opinion of the court was delivered by Justice William Rehnquist, joined by Chief Justice Warren E. Burger and Justices Byron White and Sandra Day O'Connor. Rehnquist held that the Oregon Court of Appeals had incorrectly applied Edwards v. Arizona (1981). He stated that Edwards was meant to protect an accused from being badgered by the police, and that if the accused approached the police, they may not be being badgered. He therefore argued that when the police respond to an accused's queries with questions of their own, a reviewing court may decide that the accused had waived their Fifth Amendment rights during interrogation based on the totality of the circumstances.

Rehnquist held that Bradshaw's question, "Well, what is going to happen to me now?", initiated conversation with the police "in the ordinary dictionary sense of the word." He argued that it "evinced a willingness and a desire for a generalized discussion about the investigation [and] was not merely a necessary inquiry arising out of the incidents of the custodial relationship." He stated that a suspect detained during an investigation may ask for a drink of water or to use the telephone after invoking their right to have counsel present during an interrogation without retreating from their prior invocation. However, he added that they could not ask more generalized and open-ended questions. He argued that the Edwards rule had not been violated because the police did not make any threats, promises, or inducements to Bradshaw in order to persuade him to talk, and in fact had confirmed that he had the right to counsel before resuming questioning. He therefore held that Bradshaw had voluntarily waived his right to counsel during interrogation.

=== Concurrence ===
Justice Lewis F. Powell Jr. concurred with the plurality. He agreed that Bradshaw had voluntarily waived his right to have counsel present during interrogation because, after he had asked what would happen to him, the police had confirmed that he understood his Miranda rights before having him sign a written waiver form. In these circumstances, Powell concluded that Bradshaw had voluntarily waived his right to counsel.

Powell, however, wrote that he had expressly not joined the opinion in Edwards because he was "not sure what it meant." He argued that what it meant to "initiate" conversation with the police was far from clear, supported by the fact that two possible meanings in this case had each garnered the votes of four justices. He stated that he was uncomfortable with the two-part test the plurality had adopted, under which a reviewing court would first ask whether the suspect had initiated conversation with the police before asking whether the suspect had waived his right to counsel under the totality of the circumstances. He wrote that the totality-of-the-circumstances test had historically been the only test the court had employed in the past, and he saw no reason to depart from it.

=== Dissent ===
Justice Thurgood Marshall wrote a dissent joined by Justices William J. Brennan Jr., Harry Blackmun, and John Paul Stevens. Marshall argued that the plurality had misapplied Edwards. He stated that "when this Court in Edwards spoke of 'initiat[ing] further communication' with the police and 'reopen[ing] the dialogue with the authorities,' it obviously had in mind communication or dialogue about the subject matter of the criminal investigation." He wrote that if a suspect does not invite further questioning about the criminal case at hand, they do not accede to further "interrogation" as Edwards and Miranda had contemplated. He claimed that if "interrogation" were given any broader meaning, the protections of Edwards and Miranda would be diluted.

Marshall stated that he could not understand how Bradshaw's question was meant to express a desire to speak about the criminal case at hand. He wrote that "if [Bradshaw's] question had been posed by Jean-Paul Sartre before a class of philosophy students, it might well have evinced a desire for a 'generalized' discussion. But under the circumstances of this case, it is plain that [Bradshaw's] only 'desire' was to find out where the police were going to take him." He argued that Bradshaw's question was nothing more than a response to custodial surroundings: "The very essence of custody is the loss of control over one's freedom of movement." He therefore wrote that if the police could exploit such questions as the one Bradshaw had asked to ask further questions of an accused in the face of an express desire to have a lawyer present, the protections of Miranda would dissipate.

== See also ==
- List of United States Supreme Court cases, volume 462
