= Kyllo v. United States =

- Supreme Court of the United States

Argued February 20, 2001 Decided June 11, 2001
- Full case name: Danny Lee Kyllo v. United States
- Citations: 533 U.S. 27 (more) 121 S. Ct. 2038; 150 L. Ed. 2d 94; 2001 U.S. LEXIS 4487; 69 U.S.L.W. 4431; 2001 Cal. Daily Op. Service 4749; 2001 Daily Journal DAR 5879; 2001 Colo. J. C.A.R. 2926; 14 Fla. L. Weekly Fed. S 329

Case history
- Prior: United States v. Kyllo, 190 F.3d 1041 (9th Cir. 1999); cert. granted, 530 U.S. 1305 (2000).

Holding
- Thermal imaging of a home constitutes a "search" under the Fourth Amendment and may only be done with a search warrant.

Court membership
- Chief Justice William Rehnquist Associate Justices John P. Stevens · Sandra Day O'Connor; Antonin Scalia · Anthony Kennedy; David Souter · Clarence Thomas; Ruth Bader Ginsburg · Stephen Breyer

Case opinions
- Majority: Scalia, joined by Souter, Thomas, Ginsburg, Breyer
- Dissent: Stevens, joined by Rehnquist, O'Connor, Kennedy

Laws applied
- U.S. Const. amend. IV

Kyllo v. United States, 533 U.S. 27 (2001), was a decision by the Supreme Court of the United States in which the court ruled that the use of thermal imaging devices to monitor heat radiation in or around a person's home, even if conducted from a public vantage point, is unconstitutional without a search warrant. In its majority opinion, the court held that thermal imaging constitutes a "search" under the Fourth Amendment, as the police were using devices to "explore details of the home that would previously have been unknowable without physical intrusion." The ruling has been noted for refining the reasonable expectation of privacy doctrine in light of new surveillance technologies, and when those are used in areas that are accessible to the public.

The ruling has been praised by legal scholars since the Court refused to be the arbiter to determine "what is and is not intimate" and thus worthy of protection. Instead, the Court opted to focus on "the invasiveness of the technology itself" and its ability to enable all kinds of government surveillance in the home.

== Background ==
In 1991, federal agents with the United States Department of the Interior received a tip that Danny Lee Kyllo was growing marijuana in his home in Florence, Oregon. The agents used an FLIR thermal imaging device outside Kyllo's home, which revealed an unusual amount of heat radiating from the roof and side walls compared with the rest of the house, leading the agents to suspect he was using high-intensity halide lamps that are common in cannabis cultivation. The scan was conducted from a parked car across the street, without a search warrant. The thermograms gathered from the scan were used by police later to obtain a warrant for a subsequent search of the house, and during that search federal agents found more than 100 marijuana plants. Kyllo was charged with one count of manufacturing marijuana.

At a preliminary hearing, a district court denied Kyllo's motion to suppress the evidence obtained from the thermal imaging search, ruling that the device could not "penetrate walls or windows to reveal conversations or human activities" and that the device "recorded only heat being emitted from the home". Kyllo entered a conditional guilty plea before appealing to the Ninth Circuit Court of Appeals on the grounds that observations with a thermal-imaging device constituted a search under the Fourth Amendment. The Ninth Circuit ultimately upheld admission of the evidence and allowed the criminal trial to continue. Kyllo then petitioned the U.S. Supreme Court for a writ of certiorari, which was granted in 2000.

== Opinion of the Court ==
At the Supreme Court, federal prosecutors defended the use of thermal imaging technology on two grounds: first, that thermal imaging was not an invasion of privacy, because the devices could not reveal any intimate details of the home; and second, that heat radiation can be detected in several ways from a public vantage point without the aid of technology, such as observing snow melting or smoke rising.

In a majority opinion written by Justice Antonin Scalia, the Supreme Court ruled that the thermal imaging of Kyllo's home constituted a search within the meaning of the Fourth Amendment. By a 5–4 margin, the court held that a search warrant must be obtained before the government, including the police and federal agents, may use a thermal imaging device to monitor the heat and radiation of one's home. Scalia also noted the surveillance powers that could be abused by the police with technologies that are "not in general public use." As the police did not have a warrant when they used the device outside of Kyllo's home, the search was unconstitutional.

Scalia wrote: "Where, as here, the Government uses a device that is not in general public use, to explore details of the home that would previously have been unknowable without physical intrusion, the surveillance is a ‘search’ and is presumptively unreasonable without a warrant." The majority opinion argued that a person has a reasonable expectation of privacy in his or her home, and therefore, the government cannot conduct unreasonable searches, even with technology that does not enter the home.

The Kyllo decision, relying on Katz v. United States (1967), confirmed the expectation of privacy in one's home, and limited the means by which the government can explore the home without a warrant. Scalia referred to the bright line drawn at the entrance of a home, where the Fourth Amendment is said to recognize a heightened expectation of privacy. Furthermore, Scalia discussed how future technologies could invade one's right of privacy. Scalia argued that the Framers of the Constitution would agree that such technology would be intrusive enough to warrant a search, if they knew it existed, and as such, that technology (including thermal imaging) calls for the same warrant requirements as physical intrusion.

Scalia structured the opinion to protect against more sophisticated surveillance technology that might arise in the future. This was intended to protect the home from all types of warrantless surveillance and is an interpretation of what Scalia called "the long view" of the Fourth Amendment.

=== Dissenting opinion ===
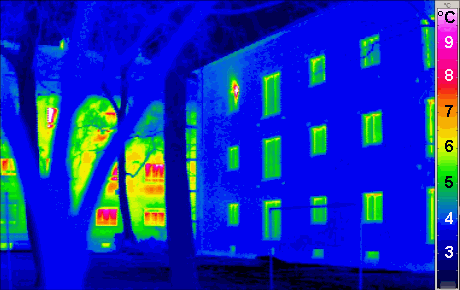
An example of a thermogram gathered from a thermal imaging device

In a dissenting opinion authored by Justice John Paul Stevens, the minority argued that the use of thermal imaging does not constitute a Fourth Amendment "search" because any person could detect the heat emissions. Stevens argued that this could be done simply by feeling that some areas in or around the house are warmer than others, or by observing that snow was melting more quickly on certain sections of the house. Since the public could gather this information on its own, it was therefore not unconstitutional for the government to do the same. The dissenting opinion asserted that the use of the thermal imaging device was merely "off-the-wall" surveillance because it did not detect any "intimate" details within Kyllo's home. According to Stevens, "Heat waves, like aromas that are generated in a kitchen, or in a laboratory or opium den, enter the public domain if and when they leave a building."

Stevens especially criticized Scalia's invocation of the bright line test, calling it "unnecessary, unwise, and inconsistent with the Fourth Amendment," because this would be defunct as soon as the surveillance technology used by the police against Kyllo went into general public use.

== Impact and subsequent developments ==
Scalia's phrases "sense-enhancing technology" and "device that is not in general public use" in the Kyllo ruling have become influential in later rulings on police search procedures, but in an inconsistent fashion. Several scholars and legal analysts noted the ambiguity in Scalia's use of those phrases. Orin Kerr wrote that such phrases "can be read plausibly as suggesting a broad and even creative view of how the Fourth Amendment should respond when technology threatens privacy." One journalist argued that this phrasing "sets up an unfortunate and unnecessary test that could erode our privacy as new technologies become more widespread." Another legal scholar called this phrasing "vague" and "considering the rapid pace of which technology is advancing daily, [is] troublesome to say the least," while "general public use" was not adequately defined.

=== Drone surveillance ===
Some analysts have questioned whether the Kyllo opinion allows the government to conduct drone surveillance on suspected criminals without a warrant, largely because drones are now commonly used by the public. Raymond Nhan compared drone surveillance by law enforcement officials to the thermal imaging carried out on Danny Lee Kyllo, arguing that they can both be used to invade someone's privacy, and stressed that there's "no clear answer" on where drone technology falls in line with the Kyllo ruling. Another analyst pointed out that modern drones employ infrared technology far more advanced than the thermal imager used on Kyllo, and drones are currently available for the general public to purchase, seemingly putting them in "general public use" according to Scalia's test. Veronica McKnight argued that modern drones are now more commonplace than thermal imaging devices, and capable of surveillance that far outweighs the imaging done on Kyllo's home.

=== Police dog searches ===
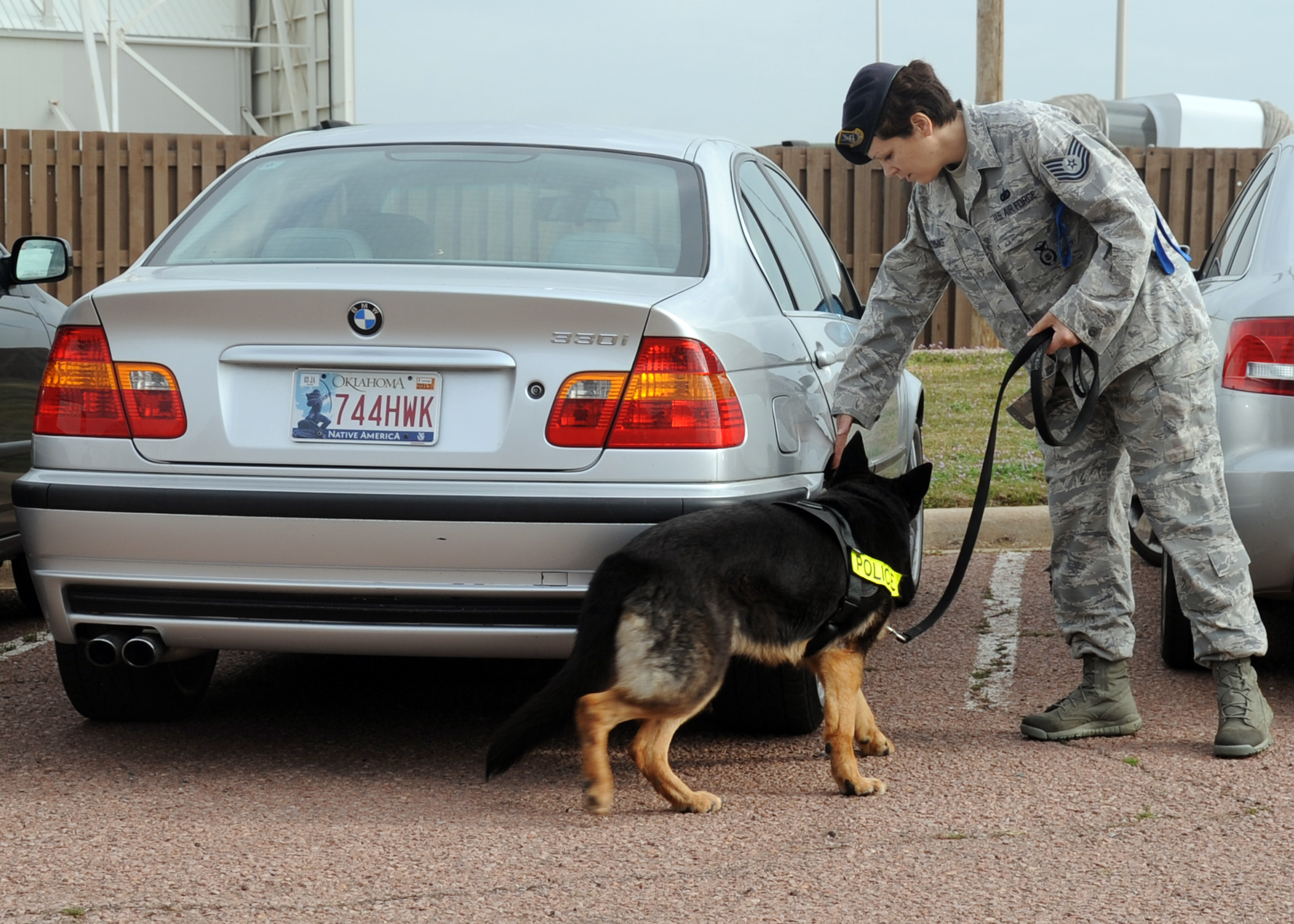
A drug-detecting dog during a training exercise

Other analysts have questioned whether drug-sniffing police dogs fall under the same category as thermal imaging devices under the Kyllo opinion. During oral arguments in the Kyllo case, Justice Sandra Day O'Connor posed that dog sniffs would be considered unconstitutional if compared to thermal imaging, despite the Supreme Court previously upholding their constitutionality in United States v. Place (1983). In the dissenting opinion in Kyllo, Stevens opined that the majority's phrasing was too broad, writing that under this new precedent, dog sniffs would be considered a search, and therefore unconstitutional without a warrant, which would effectively nullify the Place precedent.

Shannon Hurley-Deal agreed that police dogs should count as sense-enhancing technology in light of Kyllo, pointing out that a dog's sense of smell is much stronger and more enhanced than that of a human. Tracey Maclin agreed, writing that a drug-detecting dog, like a thermal imaging device, is a "law enforcement device that allows the police to obtain information regarding the interior of a home," and noted the contradictions between the Kyllo and Place rulings.

In 2005, the Supreme Court reconciled those contradictions, holding in Illinois v. Caballes that a search by a police dog was not the same as a search by thermal imaging. In 2013, the Supreme Court held in Florida v. Jardines that drug-sniffing police dogs could not be brought to the front door of a person's house without a search warrant, but based this argument on the law of trespass against property rather than a right to privacy. Justice Elena Kagan added a concurring opinion that police dogs count as "devices not in general public use" as defined by the Kyllo court.
