= Suppression of evidence =

American legal term

Suppression of evidence is a term used in the United States legal system to describe the lawful or unlawful act of preventing evidence from being shown in a trial. This could happen for several reasons. For example, if a judge believes that the evidence in question was obtained illegally, the judge can rule that it not be shown in court. It could also refer to a prosecutor improperly or intentionally hiding evidence that does not go with their case (their theory of what happened) and could suggest or prove to the judge or jury that the defendant is not guilty or that (s)he is legally obligated to show the defense. In the latter case, this would be a violation of the Fifth Amendment to the United States Constitution. Also Rule 3.8 of the ABA Model Rules of Professional Conduct requires prosecutors to "make timely disclosure to the defense of all evidence or information that tends to negate the guilt of the accused or mitigates the offense." (This is not for all states.) This can result in a mistrial in the latter case and/or the dismissal of the prosecutor.

== United States Law ==
In the United States, the motion to suppress stems from the exclusionary rule. As the U.S. Supreme Court stated in Simmons v. United States: "In order to effectuate the Fourth Amendment's guarantee of freedom from unreasonable searches and seizures, this Court long ago conferred upon defendants in federal prosecutions the right, upon motion and proof, to have excluded from trial evidence which had been secured by means of an unlawful search and seizure."

Because it is grounded in the right to be secure from unreasonable searches and seizures, a person must have standing to move to suppress evidence. In other words, one cannot object to evidence obtained by an illegal search if it was someone else's privacy that was violated.

On a federal level, a motion to suppress is set down in Rule 41(h) of the Federal Rules of Criminal Procedure.

== See also ==
- Exclusionary rule – US legal rule preventing tainted evidence from being used in a court of law
- Fourth Amendment to the United States Constitution – 1791 amendment prohibiting unreasonable searches and seizures
- Motion (legal) – Procedural device in United States law
- Search and seizure – Police powers
- Searches incident to a lawful arrest – US legal rule about allowed warrantless searches
