= List of United States Supreme Court cases, volume 462 =

This is a list of all United States Supreme Court cases from volume 462 of the United States Reports:

Case name	Citation	Date decided
Pickett v. Brown	462 U.S. 1	1983
FTC v. Grolier Inc.	462 U.S. 19	1983
Watt v. W. Nuclear, Inc.	462 U.S. 36	1983
United States v. Ptasynski	462 U.S. 74	1983
Balt. Gas & Elec. Co. v. Natural Resources Defense Council, Inc.	462 U.S. 87	1983
Maggio v. Fulford	462 U.S. 111	1983
BankAmerica Corp. v. United States	462 U.S. 122	1983
DelCostello v. Teamsters	462 U.S. 151	1983
Exxon Corp. v. Eagerton	462 U.S. 176	1983
United States v. Whiting Pools, Inc.	462 U.S. 198	1983
Illinois v. Gates	462 U.S. 213	1983
Chappell v. Wallace	462 U.S. 296	1983
Haring v. Prosise	462 U.S. 306	1983
New Mexico v. Apache Tribe	462 U.S. 324	1983
Crown, Cork & Seal Co. v. Parker	462 U.S. 345	1983
Bell v. United States	462 U.S. 356	1983
Bush v. Lucas	462 U.S. 367	1983
NLRB v. Transp. Management Corp.	462 U.S. 393	1983
Philko Aviation, Inc. v. Shacket	462 U.S. 406	1983
Akron v. Akron Center for Reproductive Health, Inc.	462 U.S. 416	1983
Planned Parenthood Ass'n v. Ashcroft	462 U.S. 476	1983
Simopoulos v. Virginia	462 U.S. 506	1983
Jones & Laughlin Steel Corp. v. Pfeifer	462 U.S. 523	1983
Texas v. New Mexico	462 U.S. 554	1983
United States v. Villamonte-Marquez	462 U.S. 579	1983
First Nat'l City Bank v. Banco Para el Comercio Exterior	462 U.S. {{{page}}}	1983
Florida v. Casal	462 U.S. 637	1983
Illinois v. Lafayette	462 U.S. 640	1983
Chardon v. Fumero Soto	462 U.S. 650	1983
Newport News Shipbuilding Co. v. EEOC	462 U.S. 669	1983
United States v. Place	462 U.S. 696	1983
Karcher v. Daggett	462 U.S. 725	1983
Mennonite Bd. of Missions v. Adams	462 U.S. 791	1983
Nat'l Assn. of Greeting Card Publishers v. Postal Service	462 U.S. 810	1983
Brown v. Thomson	462 U.S. 835	1983
Zant v. Stephens	462 U.S. 862	1983
INS v. Chadha	462 U.S. 919	1983
Idaho ex rel. Evans v. Oregon	462 U.S. 1017	1983
Oregon v. Bradshaw	462 U.S. 1039	1983
