= United States v. Place =

- Supreme Court of the United States

Argued March 2, 1983 Decided June 20, 1983
- Full case name: United States of America v. Raymond J. Place
- Citations: 462 U.S. 696 (more) 103 S. Ct. 2637; 77 L. Ed. 2d 110; 1983 U.S. LEXIS 74; 51 U.S.L.W. 4844

Case history
- Prior: Defendant's motion to suppress denied, 498 F. Supp. 1217 (E.D.N.Y. 1980), rev'd, 660 F.2d 44 (2d Cir. 1981), cert. granted, 457 U.S. 1104 (1982)

Holding
- A dog sniff is not a "search" within the meaning of the Fourth Amendment.

Court membership
- Chief Justice Warren E. Burger Associate Justices William J. Brennan Jr. · Byron White; Thurgood Marshall · Harry Blackmun; Lewis F. Powell Jr. · William Rehnquist; John P. Stevens · Sandra Day O'Connor

Case opinions
- Majority: O'Connor, joined by Burger, White, Powell, Rehnquist, Stevens
- Concurrence: Brennan, joined by Marshall
- Concurrence: Blackmun, joined by Marshall

Laws applied
- U.S. Const. amend. IV

United States v. Place, 462 U.S. 696 (1983), is a decision by the Supreme Court of the United States in which the Court held that it does not violate the Fourth Amendment to the U.S. Constitution for a trained police dog to sniff a person's luggage or property in a public place.

On August 17, 1979, suspected drug trafficker Raymond Place had his luggage seized at LaGuardia Airport by agents with the Drug Enforcement Administration, which they kept for several days and exposed to a drug-sniffing dog without a search warrant. Justice Sandra Day O'Connor wrote for the unanimous Court that the sniff of a dog is sui generis, or "uniquely pervasive", and thus police do not need probable cause for their dogs to sniff a person's belongings in a public place. The Court did rule, however, that detaining a person's belongings while waiting for a police dog to arrive did constitute a "seizure" under the Fourth Amendment.

The decision was the first case to uphold the constitutionality of police use of drug-sniffing dogs, and the Court would revisit the decision several times in the following decades. In Illinois v. Caballes (2005), the Court held that it did not violate the Fourth Amendment to use a drug-detection dog during a legal traffic stop, as long as it did not unreasonably prolong the duration of it. In 2013, the Court held that the police may not bring a police dog to the front door of a private residence without reasonable suspicion (Florida v. Jardines), but upheld that police dogs are generally accurate enough of the time for evidence gathered from them to stand in court (Florida v. Harris).

== Background ==
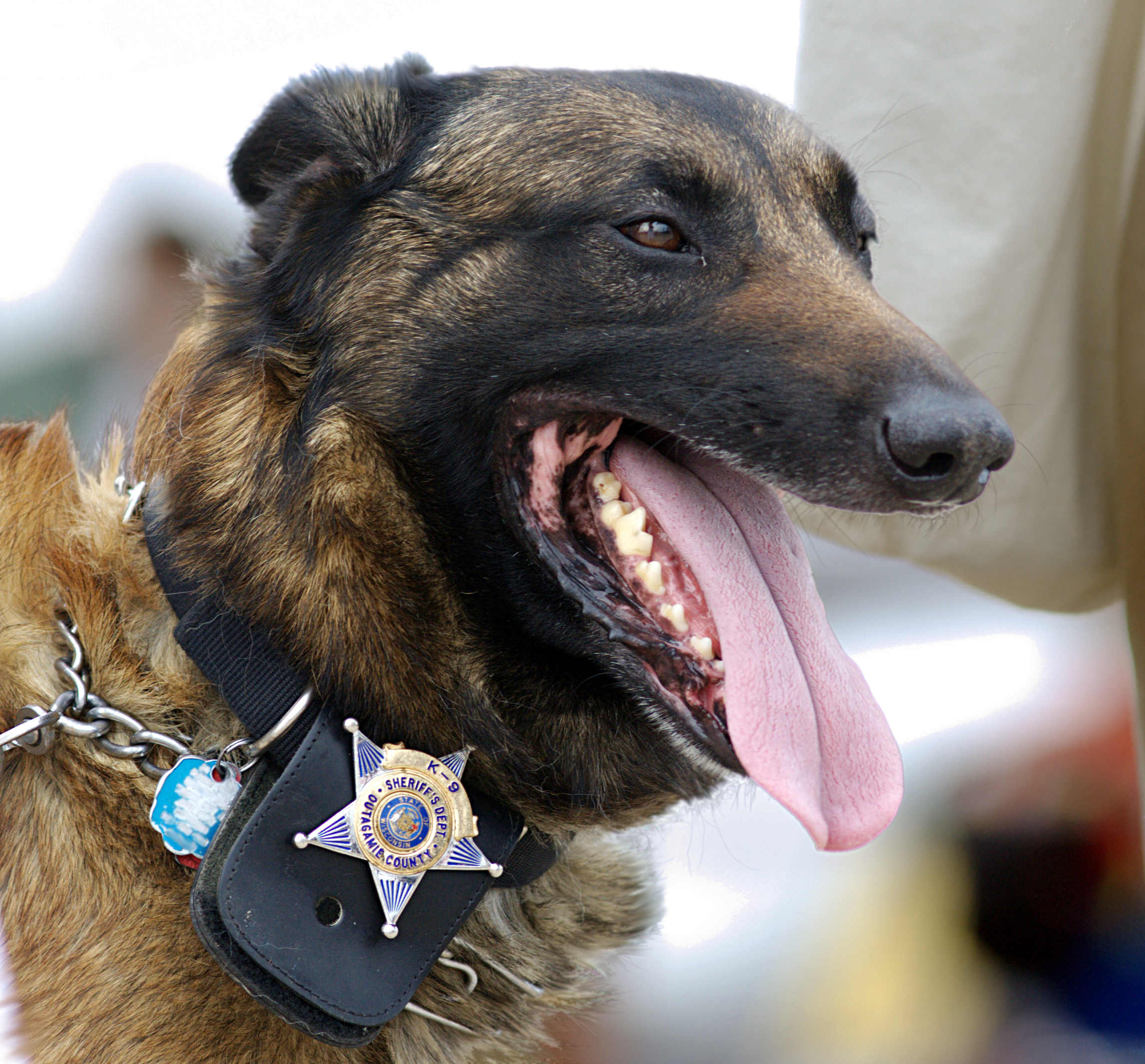
A police dog in the state of Wisconsin.

On August 17, 1979, Raymond J. Place bought a ticket at Miami International Airport to fly to LaGuardia Airport in New York City. While standing in line, he aroused the suspicion of two Miami-Dade County detectives, who approached him and asked for identification. Place gave consent for them to search his luggage, but the detectives opted not to because his flight was set to depart in five minutes. The detectives notified Drug Enforcement Administration agents at LaGuardia Airport to Place's suspicious activity, alerting them of his arrival. When Place landed in New York, DEA agents monitored him before approaching as he claimed his luggage. The DEA agents asked Place for identification, which he produced. They then asked to search Place's luggage, but he refused. The agents informed Place that they were going to take his suitcases to a federal judge to obtain a search warrant. Place denied their invitation to come with them.

The agents took Place's luggage to John F. Kennedy International Airport. About 90 minutes later, Place's luggage was subject to a "sniff test" by a trained drug-sniffing police dog, who alerted to the presence of illegal narcotics at one of the suitcases. As the luggage was detained on a Friday, agents kept the suitcases in police custody until a search warrant could be issued by a federal judge the following Monday, on August 20. Upon execution of the search warrant, agents found 1,125 grams of cocaine. Place was indicted for possession of cocaine with intent to distribute.

When tried in the district court, Place moved to suppress the cocaine, arguing that the warrantless seizure of his luggage violated his Fourth Amendment rights. The district court disagreed, holding that the police having reasonable suspicion that the luggage contained narcotics justified the detention of his belongings, and exposing it to a trained drug-sniffing dog was an acceptable escalation of their investigation. Place pleaded guilty to the possession charge and was sentenced to three years in prison. On appeal, the Second Circuit Court of Appeals reversed, holding that the prolonged seizure of Place's bags violated the principles of Terry v. Ohio (1968). Attorneys appealed to the Supreme Court, who granted certiorari in 1983.

== Opinion of the Court ==
The Fourth Amendment protects the interest people have in keeping their persons, houses, papers, and effects free from unreasonable searches and seizures. Though most of the Court's container jurisprudence deals with the search of the container rather than the initial seizure, there existed some general principles. First, the seizure may not take place without a warrant, supported by probable cause, and describing particularly the things to be seized. Second, over time, exceptions to the warrant requirement had evolved, allowing for seizure without probable cause in exigent circumstances not allowing for the time to obtain a warrant.

The Court first had to consider whether, as the lower courts had assumed, the framework of Terry v. Ohio, under which a limited detention of a person can be justified in the face of reasonable suspicion, can apply to the temporary seizure of a person's luggage. Indeed, when government agents have reason to suspect (but not probable cause to believe) that, for instance, a traveler's luggage contains narcotics, it has a substantial interest in confirming or denying that suspicion. In order to dispel that suspicion, the Court reasoned a brief seizure of the luggage could be justified. This brief seizure could not encompass a full-blown "search," just as a Terry stop may not increase in seriousness to a full-blown arrest, unless probable cause to perform the search arose during the brief detention.

In this case, the whole reason the DEA agents seized Place's luggage was so they could subject it to the dog sniff. The sniff, in turn, would violate Place's Fourth Amendment rights if it constituted a "search." A "search" is an unwarranted intrusion on a person's objectively reasonable expectation of privacy. But the sniff did not require opening the luggage; it did not expose things that are not contraband to public view. The sniff was thus far more limited than the typical search. Moreover, the sniff merely revealed the presence or absence of narcotics. Thus, it was sui generis, and did not constitute a "search" under the Fourth Amendment.

However, even though the DEA agents did not "search" Place's luggage when they subjected it to the dog sniff, their seizure of the luggage was unreasonable because it exceeded the limits of a Terry-type investigative stop. The length of time the agents had possession of Place's luggage was too great—90 minutes before the dog sniff had been conducted. Also, the agents knew what time Place's plane was scheduled to land at LaGuardia, and thus had ample time to arrange their investigation accordingly, so that taking Place's luggage from LaGuardia to Kennedy airports should not have been necessary. As such, the court found that seizure of Place's luggage was excessive and unreasonable in this case.

=== Brennan's concurrence ===
Justice Brennan concurred in the Court's judgment because he agreed with the Second Circuit that the scope of the agents' seizure of Place's luggage was unreasonable. Furthermore, Brennan noted that while Terry may authorize seizures of personal effects incident to a lawful seizure of the person, nothing in the Terry line of cases authorizes the police to seize personal property, such as luggage, independent of the seizure of the person. For Brennan, it was therefore unnecessary for the Court to decide whether the dog sniff constitutes a "search" under the Fourth Amendment. It was Brennan's view that dog sniffs can reveal more information than just the presence or absence of narcotics, and therefore constituted a "search." But Brennan did not feel that this case was an appropriate vehicle for the Court to decide how to handle dog sniffs under the Fourth Amendment.

=== Blackmun's concurrence ===
Justice Blackmun also felt that this case was not appropriate for deciding the status of dog sniffs under the Fourth Amendment. For one thing, Blackmun observed, Place had not raised the issue in either the district court or the Second Circuit. For another, Blackmun agreed with Brennan that it was not necessary to decide whether a dog sniff is a "search" in order to decide the case, because the seizure of Place's luggage was unreasonable in any event.

== See also ==
- List of United States Supreme Court cases, volume 462
- Illinois v. Caballes, 543 U.S. 405 (2005)
- Florida v. Harris, 568 U.S. 237 (2013)
- Florida v. Jardines, 569 U.S. 1 (2013)
