= 2014 term United States Supreme Court opinions of Clarence Thomas =

The 2014 term of the Supreme Court of the United States began October 6, 2014, and concluded October 4, 2015. This was the twenty-fourth term of Associate Justice Clarence Thomas's tenure on the Court.
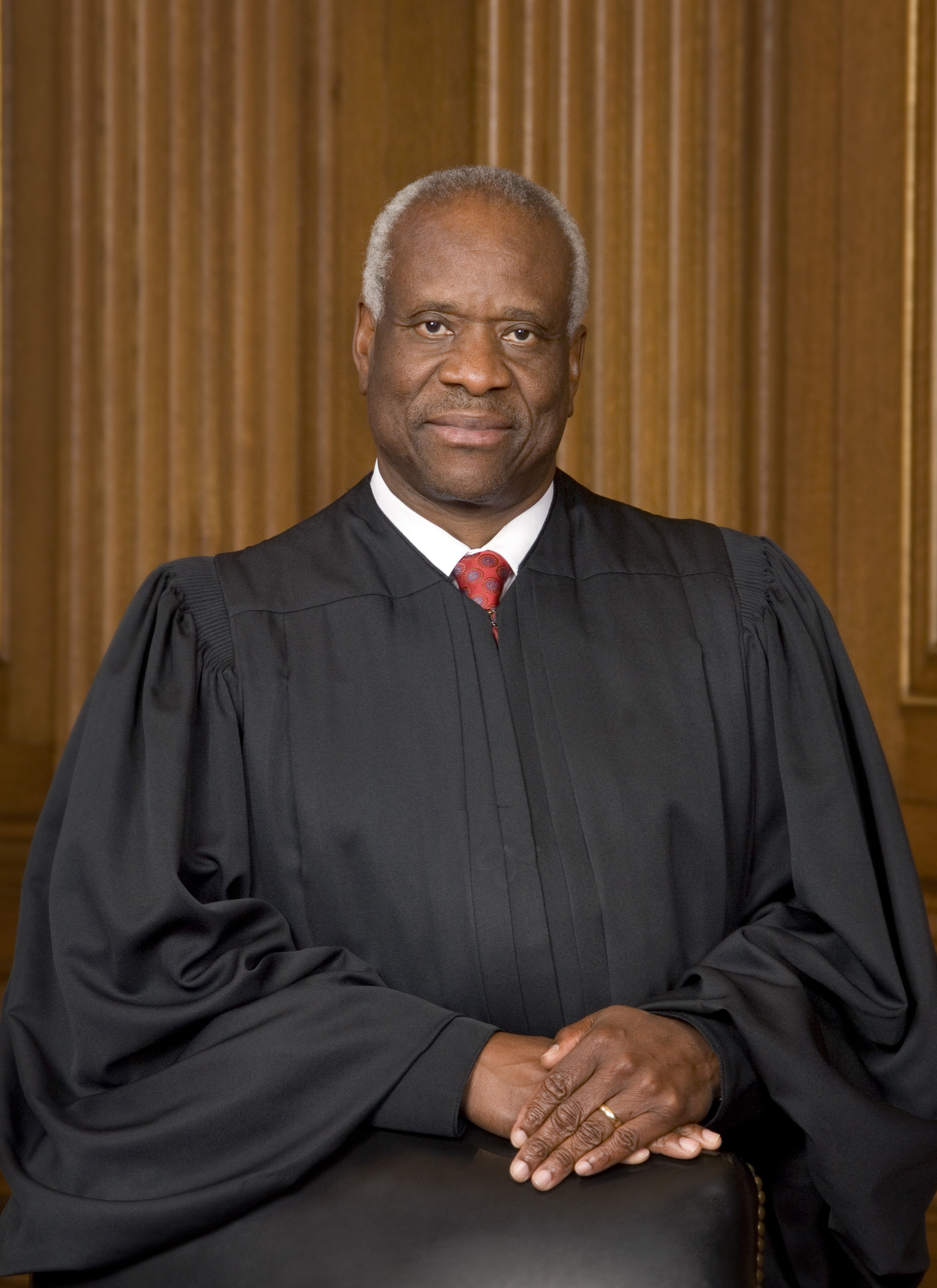

Clarence Thomas 2014 term statistics

7	Majority or plurality	10	Concurrence	1	Other
22	Dissent	3	Concurrence/dissent	Total =	43
Bench opinions = 37		Opinions relating to orders = 6		In-chambers opinions = 0
Unanimous opinions: 3		Most joined by: Scalia (17 in full, 2 in part)		Least joined by: Breyer (4 in full, 1 in part)

Type	Case	Citation	Issues	Joined by	Other opinions
	Maricopa County v. Lopez-Valenzuela	574 U.S. ___ (2014)	Arizona Proposition 100 (2006) • standard for granting writ of certiorari	Scalia	
Thomas filed a statement respecting the Court's denial of an application for a stay, saying he joined it because he did not believe four justices would vote to grant certiorari. He expressed hope, however, that his prediction would prove wrong, as the lower court's decision had invalidated a state constitutional amendment, and he thought the Court "owe[d] the people of Arizona the respect of our review."
	Integrity Staffing Solutions, Inc. v. Busk	574 U.S. ___ (2014)	Fair Labor Standards Act • Portal-to-Portal Act • compensation for theft prevention screening of employees	Unanimous	Sotomayor
	Dart Cherokee Basin Operating Co. v. Owens	574 U.S. ___ (2014)	jurisdiction over denial of appeal		Ginsburg; Scalia
	Jennings v. Stephens	574 U.S. ___ (2015)	Federal Rules of Appellate Procedure • defense of judgment on alternative grounds	Kennedy, Alito	Scalia
	T-Mobile South, LLC v. City of Roswell	574 U.S. ___ (2015)	Telecommunications Act of 1996 • denial by local government of cell phone tower placement		Sotomayor; Alito; Roberts
	Teva Pharmaceuticals USA, Inc. v. Sandoz, Inc.	574 U.S. ___ (2015)	patent law • claim construction • appellate standard of review • Federal Rules of Civil Procedure	Alito	Breyer
	Plumley v. Austin	574 U.S. ___ (2015)	greater sentence after new trial • presumption of vindictiveness	Scalia	
Thomas dissented from the Court's denial of certiorari.
	M&G Polymers USA, LLC v. Tackett	574 U.S. ___ (2015)	Employee Retirement Income Security Act • Labor Management Relations Act • interpretation of collective bargaining agreements	Unanimous	Ginsburg
	Strange v. Searcy	574 U.S. ___ (2015)	same-sex marriage	Scalia	
Thomas dissented from the Court's denial of an application for a stay.
	Kansas v. Nebraska	574 U.S. ___ (2015)	Republican River Compact	Scalia, Alito; Roberts (in part)	Kagan; Roberts; Scalia
	Direct Marketing Assn. v. Brohl	575 U.S. ___ (2015)	Tax Injunction Act • state collection of online sales tax • online retailer reporting requirements	Unanimous	Kennedy; Ginsburg
	Alabama Dept. of Revenue v. CSX Transp., Inc.	575 U.S. ___ (2015)	discriminatory taxation of rail carrier	Ginsburg	Scalia
	Department of Transportation v. Association of American Railroads	575 U.S. ___ (2015)	status of Amtrak as governmental entity • Passenger Rail Investment and Improvement Act of 2008 • separation of powers • nondelegation doctrine		Kennedy; Alito
	Perez v. Mortgage Bankers Assn.	575 U.S. ___ (2015)	Administrative Procedure Act • exclusion of interpretive rules from notice-and-comment requirements • deference to agency interpretation of ambiguous regulations • separation of powers		Sotomayor; Scalia; Alito
	B&B Hardware, Inc. v. Hargis Industries, Inc.	575 U.S. ___ (2015)	trademark law • issue preclusion • adjudication by Trademark Trial and Appeal Board	Scalia	Alito; Ginsburg
	Omnicare, Inc. v. Laborers Dist. Council Constr. Industry Pension Fund	574 U.S. ___ (2015)	Securities Act of 1933 • opinions in registration statement later proved incorrect		Kagan; Scalia
	Alabama Legislative Black Caucus v. Alabama	575 U.S. ___ (2015)	Fourteenth Amendment • Equal Protection Clause • redistricting • racial gerrymandering • Voting Rights Act of 1965		Breyer; Scalia
	Rodriguez v. United States	575 U.S. ___ (2015)	Fourth Amendment • traffic stop • dog sniff of car for drugs • reasonable suspicion	Alito; Kennedy (in part)	Ginsburg; Kennedy; Alito
	Oneok, Inc. v. Learjet, Inc.	575 U.S. ___ (2015)	Natural Gas Act • federal preemption of state antitrust laws		Breyer; Scalia
	Comptroller of Treasury of Md. v. Wynne	575 U.S. ___ (2015)	state credit for income tax paid to other states • Dormant Commerce Clause • internal consistency test	Scalia (in part)	Alito; Scalia; Ginsburg
	Wellness Int'l Network, Ltd. v. Sharif	575 U.S. ___ (2015)	bankruptcy law • Article III • consent to adjudication by bankruptcy courts		Sotomayor; Alito; Roberts
	Elonis v. United States	575 U.S. ___ (2015)	federal crime against communicating threat • scienter • First Amendment • freedom of speech		Roberts; Alito
	EEOC v. Abercrombie & Fitch Stores, Inc.	575 U.S. ___ (2015)	Title VII • refusal to hire applicant because of religious practices • disparate treatment • failure to accommodate		Scalia; Alito
	Bank of America, N. A. v. Caulkett	575 U.S. ___ (2015)	bankruptcy law • Chapter 7 • voidability of underwater junior lien	Roberts, Scalia, Ginsburg, Alito, Kagan; Kennedy, Breyer, Sotomayor (in part)	
	Mellouli v. Lynch	575 U.S. ___ (2015)	removal of alien for state law drug paraphernalia conviction	Alito	Ginsburg
	County of Maricopa v. Lopez-Valenzuela	575 U.S. ___ (2015)	Arizona Proposition 100 (2006) • denial of bail to illegal immigrants charged with serious felonies • Fourteenth Amendment • Due Process Clause • substantive due process	Scalia	
Thomas dissented from the Court's denial of certiorari.
	Zivotofsky v. Kerry	576 U.S. ___ (2015)	diplomatic recognition • separation of powers • Article Two • U.S. position on status of Jerusalem • Foreign Relations Authorization Act, Fiscal Year 2003 • passport designation of births in Jerusalem		Kennedy; Breyer; Roberts; Scalia
	Jackson v. City and County of San Francisco	576 U.S. ___ (2015)	Second Amendment • city restrictions on handgun accessibility in the home	Scalia	
Thomas dissented from the Court's denial of certiorari.
	Baker Botts L.L.P. v. ASARCO LLC	576 U.S. ___ (2015)	bankruptcy law • Chapter 11 • attorney's fee application • award of attorneys fees for defending application • American Rule	Roberts, Scalia, Kennedy, Alito; Sotomayor (in part)	Sotomayor; Breyer
	Reyes Mata v. Lynch	576 U.S. ___ (2015)	immigration law • motion to reopen removal proceedings • court of appeals jurisdiction to review Board of Immigration Appeals actions		Kagan
	Reed v. Town of Gilbert	576 U.S. ___ (2015)	First Amendment • free speech • content-based restrictions • regulation of signs on private property	Roberts, Scalia, Kennedy, Alito, Sotomayor	Breyer; Alito; Kagan
	McFadden v. United States	576 U.S. ___ (2015)	Controlled Substance Analogue Enforcement Act of 1986 • knowledge requirement	Scalia, Kennedy, Ginsburg, Breyer, Alito, Sotomayor, Kagan	Roberts
	Ohio v. Clark	576 U.S. ___ (2015)	Sixth Amendment • Confrontation Clause • admissibility of statements by child abuse victim to teacher • mandatory reporting obligations		Alito; Scalia
	Davis v. Ayala	576 U.S. ___ (2015)	solitary confinement		Alito; Kennedy; Sotomayor
	Brumfield v. Cain	576 U.S. ___ (2015)	Eighth Amendment • execution of the intellectually disabled • Antiterrorism and Effective Death Penalty Act of 1996	Roberts, Scalia, Alito (in part)	Sotomayor; Alito
	Horne v. Department of Agriculture	576 U.S. ___ (2015)	Agricultural Marketing Agreement Act of 1937 • National Raisin Reserve • Fifth Amendment • Takings Clause		Roberts; Breyer; Sotomayor
	Texas Dept. of Housing and Community Affairs v. Inclusive Communities Project, Inc.	576 U.S. ___ (2015)	Fair Housing Act • state allocation of federal low-income housing tax credits • disparate impact		Kennedy; Alito
	Johnson v. United States	576 U.S. ___ (2015)	Armed Career Criminal Act • residual clause • Fifth Amendment • Due Process Clause • void for vagueness		Scalia; Kennedy; Alito
	Obergefell v. Hodges	576 U.S. ___ (2015)	same-sex marriage • Fourteenth Amendment • Due Process Clause • Equal Protection Clause	Scalia	Kennedy; Roberts; Scalia; Alito
	Michigan v. EPA	576 U.S. ___ (2015)	Clean Air Act • regulation of power plant emissions • relevance of cost to decision to regulate		Scalia; Kagan
	Arizona State Legislature v. Arizona Independent Redistricting Comm'n	576 U.S. ___ (2015)	Elections Clause • legislative redistricting • Arizona Proposition 106 (2000) • gerrymandering • Article III • standing of legislature to bring suit	Scalia	Ginsburg; Roberts; Scalia
	Glossip v. Gross	576 U.S. ___ (2015)	Eighth Amendment • death penalty • use of midazolam in lethal injection	Scalia	Alito; Scalia; Breyer; Sotomayor
	Joyner v. Barnes	576 U.S. ___ (2015)	Antiterrorism and Effective Death Penalty Act of 1996	Alito	
Thomas dissented from the Court's denial of certiorari.
