= 2014 term United States Supreme Court opinions of Samuel Alito =

US court

The 2014 term of the Supreme Court of the United States began October 6, 2014, and concluded October 4, 2015. This was the tenth term of Associate Justice Samuel Alito's tenure on the Court.
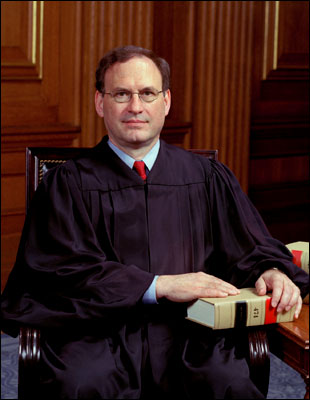

Samuel Alito 2014 term statistics

8	Majority or plurality	9	Concurrence	0	Other
15	Dissent	1	Concurrence/dissent	Total =	33
Bench opinions = 30		Opinions relating to orders = 3		In-chambers opinions = 0
Unanimous opinions: 2		Most joined by: Thomas (14)		Least joined by: Ginsburg, Kagan (4)

Type	Case	Citation	Issues	Joined by	Other opinions
	Frank v. Walker	574 U.S. ___ (2014)	state voter identification law	Scalia, Thomas	
Alito dissented from the Court's vacatur of the lower court's stay.
	Volkman v. United States	574 U.S. ___ (2014)	causation of death by unlawful distribution of controlled substance	Thomas	
Alito concurred in the Court's vacatur and remand of the lower court's decision.
	Kalamazoo County Road Comm'n v. Deleon	574 U.S. ___ (2015)	employment discrimination • granting of requested transfer as adverse employment action		
Alito dissented from the Court's denial of certiorari.
	T-Mobile South, LLC v. City of Roswell	574 U.S. ___ (2015)	Telecommunications Act of 1996 • denial by local government of cell phone tower placement		Sotomayor; Roberts; Thomas
	Holt v. Hobbs	574 U.S. ___ (2015)	Religious Land Use and Institutionalized Persons Act • prison regulation of beard growth • Islamic beard customs	Unanimous	Ginsburg; Sotomayor
	Christeson v. Roper	574 U.S. ___ (2015)	Antiterrorism and Effective Death Penalty Act of 1996 • equitable tolling • substitution of counsel	Thomas	per curiam
	North Carolina Bd. of Dental Examiners v. FTC	574 U.S. ___ (2015)	Sherman Antitrust Act • state-action antitrust immunity	Scalia, Thomas	Kennedy
	Yates v. United States	574 U.S. ___ (2015)	catching of undersized fish • destruction of tangible object to impede federal investigation		Ginsburg; Kagan
	Department of Transportation v. Association of American Railroads	575 U.S. ___ (2015)	status of Amtrak as governmental entity • Passenger Rail Investment and Improvement Act of 2008 • separation of powers • nondelegation doctrine		Kennedy; Thomas
	Perez v. Mortgage Bankers Assn.	575 U.S. ___ (2015)	Administrative Procedure Act • exclusion of interpretive rules from notice-and-comment requirements • deference to agency interpretation of ambiguous regulations		Sotomayor; Scalia; Thomas
	B&B Hardware, Inc. v. Hargis Industries, Inc.	575 U.S. ___ (2015)	trademark law • issue preclusion • adjudication by Trademark Trial and Appeal Board	Roberts, Kennedy, Ginsburg, Breyer, Sotomayor, Kagan	Ginsburg; Thomas
	Young v. United Parcel Service, Inc.	575 U.S. ___ (2015)	Pregnancy Discrimination Act • disparate treatment claim		Breyer; Scalia; Kennedy
	Rodriguez v. United States	575 U.S. ___ (2015)	Fourth Amendment • traffic stop • dog sniff of car for drugs • reasonable suspicion		Ginsburg; Kennedy; Thomas
	United States v. Kwai Fun Wong	575 U.S. ___ (2015)	Federal Tort Claims Act • statute of limitations • equitable tolling	Roberts, Scalia, Thomas	Kagan
	Williams-Yulee v. Florida Bar	575 U.S. ___ (2015)	First Amendment • freedom of speech • ban on personal solicitation of campaign funds by judicial candidates		Roberts; Ginsburg; Breyer; Scalia; Kennedy
	Comptroller of Treasury of Md. v. Wynne	575 U.S. ___ (2015)	state credit for income tax paid to other states • Dormant Commerce Clause • internal consistency test	Roberts, Kennedy, Breyer, Sotomayor	Scalia; Thomas; Ginsburg
	City and County of San Francisco v. Sheehan	575 U.S. ___ (2015)	Americans with Disabilities Act of 1990 • obligation to provide accommodations to mentally ill arrestee • Fourth Amendment • improvidently granted certiorari	Roberts, Kennedy, Thomas, Ginsburg, Sotomayor	Scalia
	Kellogg Brown & Root Services, Inc. v. United States ex rel. Carter	575 U.S. ___ (2015)	False Claims Act • qui tam • statute of limitations • Wartime Suspension of Limitations Act	Unanimous	
	Wellness Int'l Network, Ltd. v. Sharif	575 U.S. ___ (2015)	bankruptcy law • Article III • consent to adjudication by bankruptcy courts		Sotomayor; Roberts; Thomas
	Elonis v. United States	575 U.S. ___ (2015)	federal crime against communicating threat • scienter		Roberts; Thomas
	EEOC v. Abercrombie & Fitch Stores, Inc.	575 U.S. ___ (2015)	Title VII • refusal to hire applicant because of religious practices • disparate treatment • failure to accommodate		Scalia; Thomas
	Reed v. Town of Gilbert	576 U.S. ___ (2015)	First Amendment • free speech • content-based restrictions • regulation of signs on private property	Sotomayor	Thomas; Breyer; Kagan
	Walker v. Texas Div., Sons of Confederate Veterans, Inc.	576 U.S. ___ (2015)	First Amendment • free speech • government speech • specialty license plates	Roberts, Scalia, Kennedy	Breyer
	Ohio v. Clark	576 U.S. ___ (2015)	Sixth Amendment • Confrontation Clause • admissibility of statements by child abuse victim to teacher • mandatory reporting obligations	Roberts, Kennedy, Breyer, Sotomayor, Kagan	Scalia; Thomas
	Davis v. Ayala	576 U.S. ___ (2015)	Equal Protection Clause • race-based peremptory challenge in jury selection • ex parte hearing of prosecutor's justification of challenges • harmless error	Roberts, Scalia, Kennedy, Thomas	Kennedy; Thomas; Sotomayor
	Brumfield v. Cain	576 U.S. ___ (2015)	Eighth Amendment • execution of the intellectually disabled • Antiterrorism and Effective Death Penalty Act of 1996	Roberts	Sotomayor; Thomas
	Kingsley v. Hendrickson	576 U.S. ___ (2015)	Fourteenth Amendment • Due Process Clause • excessive force against pretrial detainee		Breyer; Scalia
	Los Angeles v. Patel	576 U.S. ___ (2015)	Fourth Amendment • mandated hotel guest record keeping and inspection • facial challenge	Thomas	Sotomayor; Scalia
	Kimble v. Marvel Entertainment, LLC	576 U.S. ___ (2015)	patent law • post-expiration royalty payments • stare decisis	Roberts, Thomas	Kagan
	Texas Dept. of Housing and Community Affairs v. Inclusive Communities Project, Inc.	576 U.S. ___ (2015)	Fair Housing Act • state allocation of federal low-income housing tax credits • disparate impact	Roberts, Scalia, Thomas	Kennedy; Thomas
	Johnson v. United States	576 U.S. ___ (2015)	Armed Career Criminal Act • residual clause • Fifth Amendment • Due Process Clause • void for vagueness		Scalia; Kennedy; Thomas
	Obergefell v. Hodges	576 U.S. ___ (2015)	same-sex marriage • Fourteenth Amendment • Due Process Clause • Equal Protection Clause	Scalia, Thomas	Kennedy; Roberts; Scalia; Thomas
	Glossip v. Gross	576 U.S. ___ (2015)	Eighth Amendment • death penalty • use of midazolam in lethal injection	Roberts, Scalia, Kennedy, Thomas	Scalia; Thomas; Breyer; Sotomayor
