= 2014 term United States Supreme Court opinions of Antonin Scalia =

The 2014 term of the Supreme Court of the United States began October 6, 2014, and concluded October 4, 2015. This was the twenty-ninth term of Associate Justice Antonin Scalia's tenure on the Court.
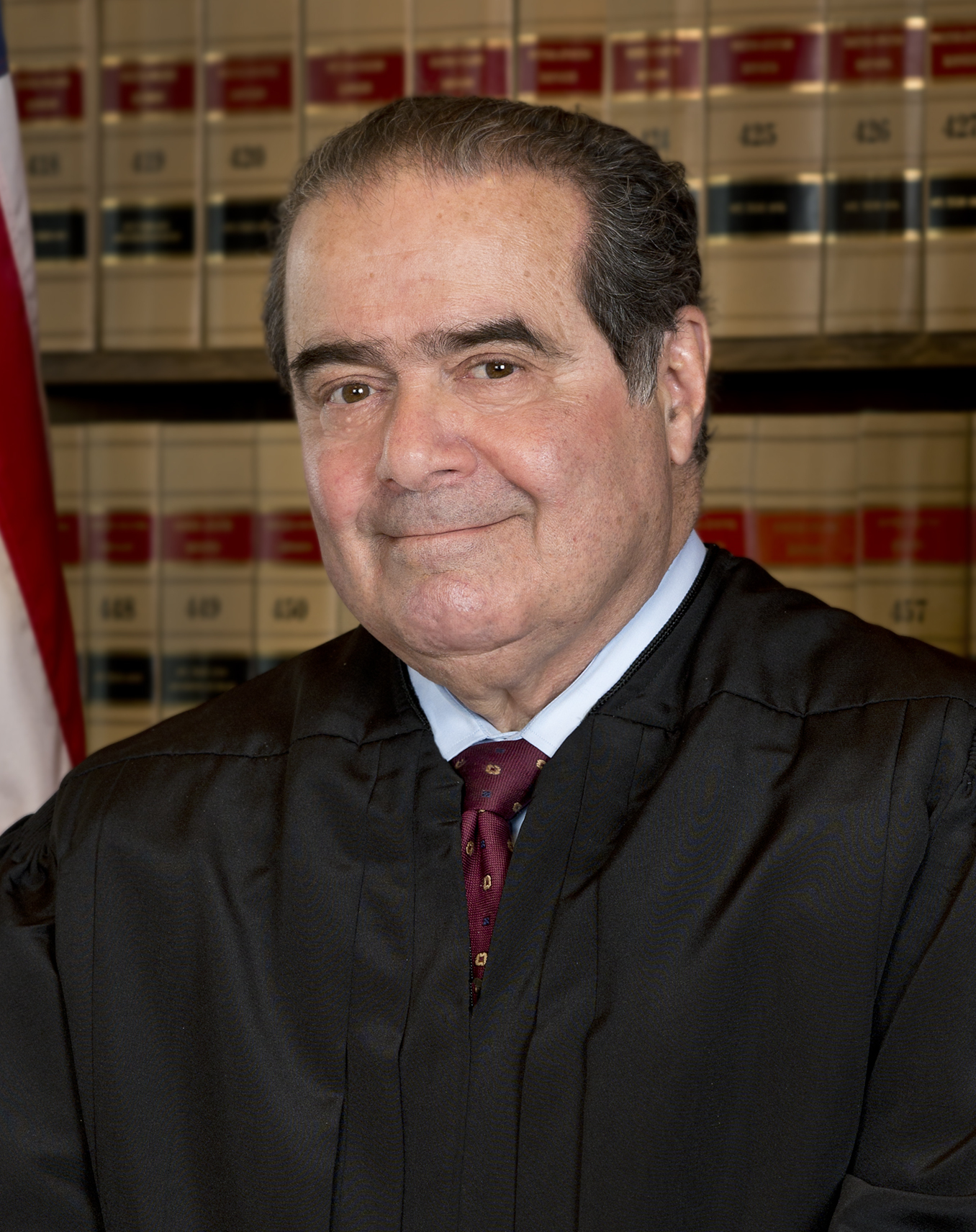

Antonin Scalia 2014 term statistics

9	Majority or plurality	4	Concurrence	1	Other
14	Dissent	2	Concurrence/dissent	Total =	30
Bench opinions = 28		Opinions relating to orders = 2		In-chambers opinions = 0
Unanimous opinions: 2		Most joined by: Thomas (16 in full, 2 in part)		Least joined by: Sotomayor (6)

Type	Case	Citation	Issues	Joined by	Other opinions
	Jones v. United States	574 U.S. ___ (2014)	Sixth Amendment • right to jury trial • sentencing based on judicial fact-finding	Thomas, Ginsburg	
Scalia dissented from the Court's denial of certiorari.
	Whitman v. United States	574 U.S. ___ (2014)	Securities Exchange Act of 1934 • deference to agency interpretation of statutes • rule of lenity	Thomas	
Scalia filed a statement respecting the Court's denial of certiorari.
	Dart Cherokee Basin Operating Co. v. Owens	574 U.S. ___ (2014)	jurisdiction over denial of appeal	Kennedy, Kagan; Thomas (in part)	Ginsburg; Thomas
	Jesinoski v. Countrywide Home Loans, Inc.	574 U.S. ___ (2015)	Truth in Lending Act • rescission by borrower	Unanimous	
	Whitfield v. United States	574 U.S. ___ (2015)	federal criminal law • enhanced sentencing penalty for forced accompaniment during bank robbery	Unanimous	
	Jennings v. Stephens	574 U.S. ___ (2015)	Federal Rules of Appellate Procedure • defense of judgment on alternative grounds	Roberts, Ginsburg, Breyer, Sotomayor, Kagan	Thomas
	Kansas v. Nebraska	574 U.S. ___ (2015)	Republican River Compact		Kagan; Roberts; Thomas
	Alabama Dept. of Revenue v. CSX Transp., Inc.	575 U.S. ___ (2015)	discriminatory taxation of rail carrier	Roberts, Kennedy, Breyer, Alito, Sotomayor, Kagan	Thomas
	Perez v. Mortgage Bankers Assn.	575 U.S. ___ (2015)	Administrative Procedure Act • exclusion of interpretive rules from notice-and-comment requirements • deference to agency interpretation of ambiguous regulations		Sotomayor; Thomas; Alito
	Omnicare, Inc. v. Laborers Dist. Council Constr. Industry Pension Fund	574 U.S. ___ (2015)	Securities Act of 1933 • opinions in registration statement later proved incorrect		Kagan; Thomas
	Young v. United Parcel Service, Inc.	575 U.S. ___ (2015)	Pregnancy Discrimination Act • disparate treatment claim	Kennedy, Thomas	Breyer; Alito; Kennedy
	Alabama Legislative Black Caucus v. Alabama	575 U.S. ___ (2015)	Fourteenth Amendment • Equal Protection Clause • redistricting • racial gerrymandering • Voting Rights Act of 1965	Roberts, Thomas, Alito	Breyer; Thomas
	Armstrong v. Exceptional Child Center, Inc.	575 U.S. ___ (2015)	Medicaid • Supremacy Clause • implied right of action	Roberts, Thomas, Alito; Breyer (in part)	Breyer; Sotomayor
	Oneok, Inc. v. Learjet, Inc.	575 U.S. ___ (2015)	Natural Gas Act • federal preemption of state antitrust laws	Roberts	Breyer; Thomas
	Williams-Yulee v. Florida Bar	575 U.S. ___ (2015)	First Amendment • freedom of speech • ban on personal solicitation of campaign funds by judicial candidates	Thomas	Roberts; Ginsburg; Breyer; Kennedy; Alito
	Comptroller of Treasury of Md. v. Wynne	575 U.S. ___ (2015)	state credit for income tax paid to other states • Dormant Commerce Clause • internal consistency test	Thomas (in part)	Alito; Thomas; Ginsburg
	City and County of San Francisco v. Sheehan	575 U.S. ___ (2015)	Americans with Disabilities Act of 1990 • obligation to provide accommodations to mentally ill arrestee • improvidently granted certiorari	Kagan	Alito
	Commil USA, LLC v. Cisco Systems, Inc.	575 U.S. ___ (2015)	patent law • induced infringement • belief in patent invalidity as defense	Roberts	Kennedy
	EEOC v. Abercrombie & Fitch Stores, Inc.	575 U.S. ___ (2015)	Title VII • refusal to hire applicant because of religious practices • disparate treatment • failure to accommodate	Roberts, Kennedy, Ginsburg, Breyer, Sotomayor, Kagan	Alito; Thomas
	Zivotofsky v. Kerry	576 U.S. ___ (2015)	diplomatic recognition • separation of powers • Article Two • U.S. position on status of Jerusalem • Foreign Relations Authorization Act, Fiscal Year 2003 • passport designation of births in Jerusalem	Roberts, Alito	Kennedy; Breyer; Thomas; Roberts
	Kerry v. Din	576 U.S. ___ (2015)	Immigration and Nationality Act • exclusion of alien for terrorist activities • denial of spouse's visa • Due Process Clause • substantive due process • liberty interest in marriage	Roberts, Thomas	Kennedy; Breyer
	Ohio v. Clark	576 U.S. ___ (2015)	Sixth Amendment • Confrontation Clause • admissibility of statements by child abuse victim to teacher • mandatory reporting obligations	Ginsburg	Alito; Thomas
	Kingsley v. Hendrickson	576 U.S. ___ (2015)	Fourteenth Amendment • Due Process Clause • excessive force against pretrial detainee	Roberts, Thomas	Breyer; Alito
	Los Angeles v. Patel	576 U.S. ___ (2015)	Fourth Amendment • mandated hotel guest record keeping and inspection • facial challenge	Roberts, Thomas	Sotomayor; Alito
	King v. Burwell	576 U.S. ___ (2015)	Patient Protection and Affordable Care Act • federally established health care exchanges • federal tax credit subsidies for individual purchase of health insurance	Thomas, Alito	Roberts
	Johnson v. United States	576 U.S. ___ (2015)	Armed Career Criminal Act • residual clause • Fifth Amendment • Due Process Clause • void for vagueness	Roberts, Ginsburg, Breyer, Sotomayor, Kagan	Kennedy; Thomas; Alito
	Obergefell v. Hodges	576 U.S. ___ (2015)	same-sex marriage • Fourteenth Amendment • Due Process Clause • Equal Protection Clause	Thomas	Kennedy; Roberts; Thomas; Alito
	Michigan v. EPA	576 U.S. ___ (2015)	Clean Air Act • regulation of power plant emissions • relevance of cost to decision to regulate	Roberts, Kennedy, Thomas, Alito	Thomas; Kagan
	Arizona State Legislature v. Arizona Independent Redistricting Comm'n	576 U.S. ___ (2015)	Elections Clause • legislative redistricting • Arizona Proposition 106 (2000) • gerrymandering • Article III • standing of legislature to bring suit	Thomas	Ginsburg; Roberts; Thomas
	Glossip v. Gross	576 U.S. ___ (2015)	Eighth Amendment • death penalty • use of midazolam in lethal injection	Thomas	Alito; Thomas; Breyer; Sotomayor
