= 2014 term United States Supreme Court opinions of Sonia Sotomayor =

The 2014 term of the Supreme Court of the United States began October 6, 2014, and concluded October 4, 2015. This was the sixth term of Associate Justice Sonia Sotomayor's tenure on the Court.
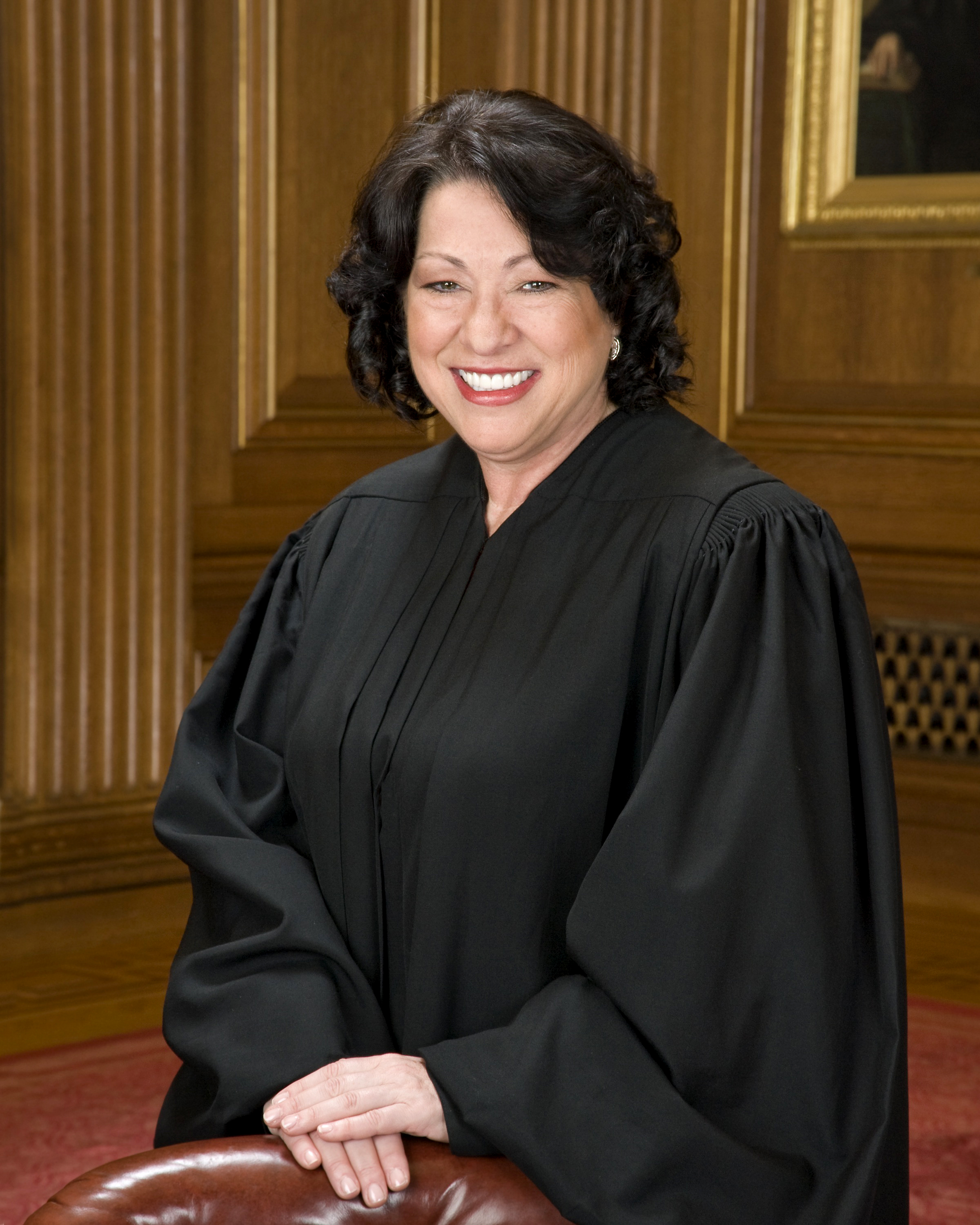

Sonia Sotomayor 2014 term statistics

7	Majority or plurality	3	Concurrence	2	Other
8	Dissent	0	Concurrence/dissent	Total =	20
Bench opinions = 16		Opinions relating to orders = 4		In-chambers opinions = 0
Unanimous opinions: 2		Most joined by: Kagan (13)		Least joined by: Roberts, Scalia (3)

Type	Case	Citation	Issues	Joined by	Other opinions
	Redd v. Chappell	574 U.S. 1041 (2014)	state law guarantee of counsel in habeas corpus proceedings	Breyer	
Sotomayor filed a statement respecting the Court's denial of certiorari.
	Integrity Staffing Solutions, Inc. v. Busk	574 U.S. 37 (2014)	Fair Labor Standards Act • Portal-to-Portal Act • compensation for postwork antitheft screening of employees	Kagan	Thomas
	Warger v. Shauers	574 U.S. 40 (2014)	Federal Rule of Evidence 606(b) • inadmissibility of statements made during jury deliberation • challenge to trial verdict based on dishonesty during voir dire	Unanimous	
	Heien v. North Carolina	574 U.S. 71 (2014)	Fourth Amendment • reasonableness of search • mistake of law by police		Roberts; Kagan
	T-Mobile South, LLC v. City of Roswell	574 U.S. 293 (2015)	Telecommunications Act of 1996 • denial by local government of cell phone tower placement	Scalia, Kennedy, Breyer, Alito, Kagan	Alito; Roberts; Thomas
	Warner v. Gross	574 U.S. 1112 (2015)	Eighth Amendment • capital punishment • lethal injection	Ginsburg, Breyer, Kagan	
Sotomayor dissented from the Court's denial of stays of execution of sentences of death.
	Holt v. Hobbs	574 U.S. 352 (2015)	Religious Land Use and Institutionalized Persons Act • prison regulation of beard growth • Islamic beard customs		Alito; Ginsburg
	Department of Homeland Security v. MacLean	574 U.S. 400 (2015)	Homeland Security Act • Aviation and Transportation Security Act • unauthorized disclosure of security operations by Federal Air Marshall • Sensitive Security Information • Whistleblower Protection Act	Kennedy	Roberts
	Hana Financial, Inc. v. Hana Bank	574 U.S. 418 (2015)	trademark law • priority right • tacking • determination by jury	Unanimous	
	Perez v. Mortgage Bankers Assn.	575 U.S. 92 (2015)	Administrative Procedure Act • exclusion of interpretive rules from notice-and-comment requirements	Roberts, Kennedy, Ginsburg, Breyer, Kagan; Alito (in part)	Scalia; Thomas; Alito
	Armstrong v. Exceptional Child Center, Inc.	575 U.S. 336 (2015)	Medicaid • Supremacy Clause • implied right of action	Kennedy, Ginsburg, Kagan	Scalia; Breyer
	Wellness Int'l Network, Ltd. v. Sharif	575 U.S. 665 (2015)	bankruptcy law • Article III • consent to adjudication by bankruptcy courts	Kennedy, Ginsburg, Breyer, Kagan; Alito (in part)	Alito; Roberts; Thomas
	Baker Botts L.L.P. v. ASARCO LLC	576 U.S. 135 (2015)	bankruptcy law • Chapter 11 • attorney's fee application • award of attorneys fees for defending application • American Rule		Thomas; Breyer
	Davis v. Ayala	576 U.S. 290 (2015)	Equal Protection Clause • race-based peremptory challenge in jury selection • ex parte hearing of prosecutor's justification of challenges • harmless error	Ginsburg, Breyer, Kagan	Alito; Kennedy; Thomas
	Brumfield v. Cain	576 U.S. 305 (2015)	Eighth Amendment • execution of the intellectually disabled • Antiterrorism and Effective Death Penalty Act of 1996	Kennedy, Ginsburg, Breyer, Kagan	Thomas; Alito
	Horne v. Department of Agriculture	576 U.S. 377 (2015)	Agricultural Marketing Agreement Act of 1937 • National Raisin Reserve • Fifth Amendment • Takings Clause		Roberts; Thomas; Breyer
	Los Angeles v. Patel	576 U.S. 409 (2015)	Fourth Amendment • mandated hotel guest record keeping and inspection • facial challenge	Kennedy, Ginsburg, Breyer, Kagan	Scalia; Alito
	Carlton v. United States	576 U.S. 1044 (2015)	sentence enhancement based on factual error • plain error review	Breyer	
Sotomayor filed a statement respecting the Court's denial of certiorari.
	Glossip v. Gross	576 U.S. 949 (2015)	Eighth Amendment • death penalty • use of midazolam in lethal injection	Ginsburg, Breyer, Kagan	Alito; Scalia; Thomas; Breyer
	Jordan v. Fisher	576 U.S. 1071 (2015)	prosecutorial vindictiveness • certificate of appealability	Ginsburg, Kagan	
Sotomayor dissented from the Court's denial of certiorari.
