= 2014 term United States Supreme Court opinions of John Roberts =

The 2014 term of the Supreme Court of the United States began October 6, 2014, and concluded October 4, 2015. This was the tenth term of Chief Justice John Roberts's tenure on the Court.
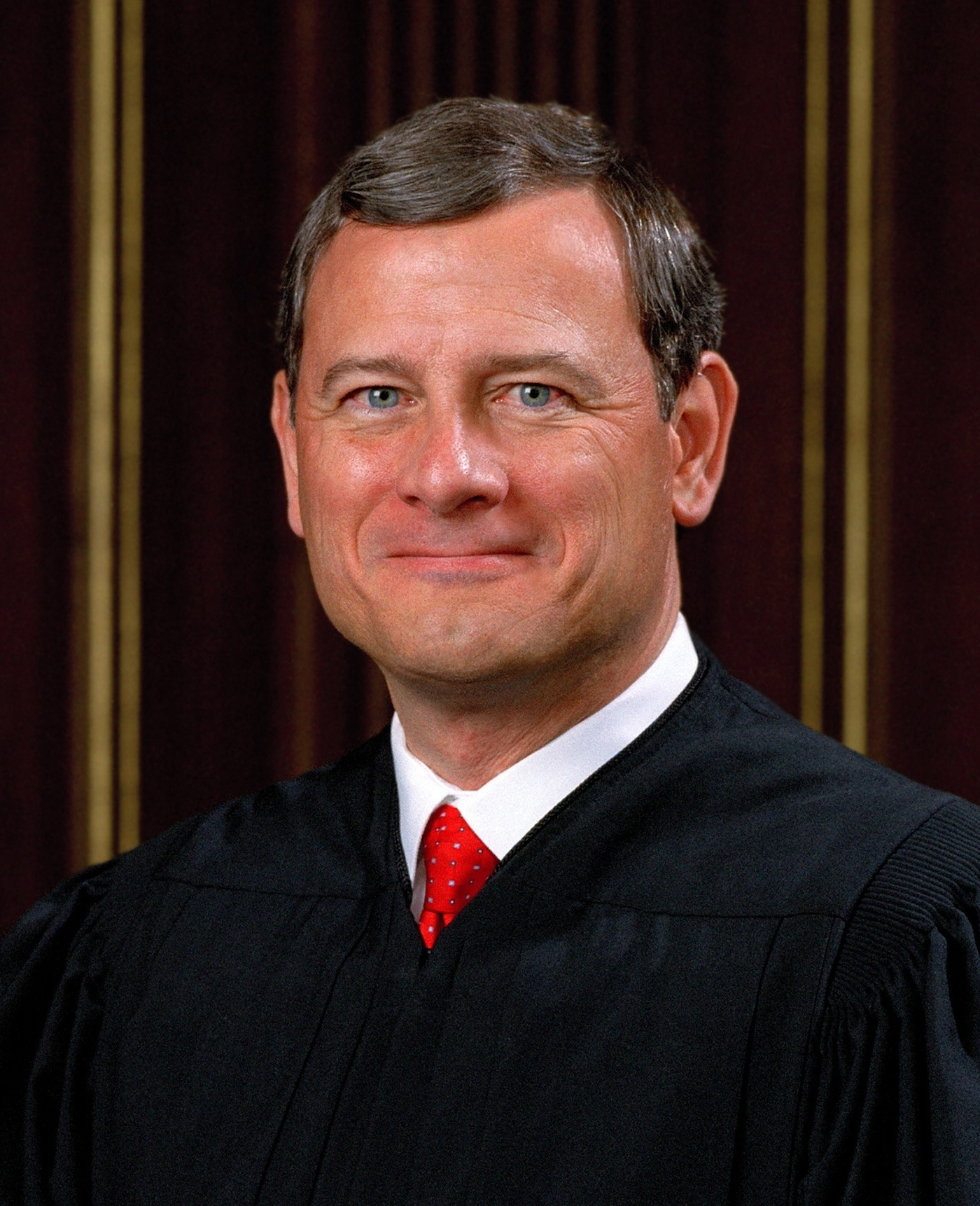

John Roberts 2014 term statistics

7	Majority or plurality	1	Concurrence	0	Other
5	Dissent	1	Concurrence/dissent	Total =	14
Bench opinions = 14		Opinions relating to orders = 0		In-chambers opinions = 0
Unanimous opinions: 1		Most joined by: Scalia (8)		Least joined by: Sotomayor (4)

Type	Case	Citation	Issues	Joined by	Other opinions
	Heien v. North Carolina	574 U.S. ___ (2014)	Fourth Amendment • reasonableness of search • mistake of law by police	Scalia, Kennedy, Thomas, Ginsburg, Breyer, Alito, Kagan	Kagan; Sotomayor
	T-Mobile South, LLC v. City of Roswell	574 U.S. ___ (2015)	Telecommunications Act of 1996 • denial by local government of cell phone tower placement	Ginsburg; Thomas (in part)	Sotomayor; Alito; Thomas
	Department of Homeland Security v. MacLean	574 U.S. ___ (2015)	Homeland Security Act • Aviation and Transportation Security Act • unauthorized disclosure of security operations by Federal Air Marshall • Sensitive Security Information • Whistleblower Protection Act	Scalia, Thomas, Ginsburg, Breyer, Alito, Kagan	Sotomayor
	Kansas v. Nebraska	574 U.S. ___ (2015)	Republican River Compact		Kagan; Scalia; Thomas
	Williams-Yulee v. Florida Bar	575 U.S. ___ (2015)	First Amendment • freedom of speech • ban on personal solicitation of campaign funds by judicial candidates	Breyer, Sotomayor, Kagan; Ginsburg (in part)	Ginsburg; Breyer; Scalia; Kennedy; Alito
	Bullard v. Blue Hills Bank	575 U.S. ___ (2015)	bankruptcy • Chapter 13 • appealability of order denying confirmation of debtor's repayment plan	Unanimous	
	Wellness Int'l Network, Ltd. v. Sharif	575 U.S. ___ (2015)	bankruptcy law • Article III • consent to adjudication by bankruptcy courts	Scalia; Thomas (in part)	Sotomayor; Alito; Thomas
	Elonis v. United States	575 U.S. ___ (2015)	federal crime against communicating threat • scienter	Scalia, Kennedy, Ginsburg, Breyer, Sotomayor, Kagan	Alito; Thomas
	Zivotofsky v. Kerry	576 U.S. ___ (2015)	diplomatic recognition • separation of powers • Article Two • U.S. position on status of Jerusalem • Foreign Relations Authorization Act, Fiscal Year 2003 • passport designation of births in Jerusalem	Alito	Kennedy; Breyer; Thomas; Scalia
	McFadden v. United States	576 U.S. ___ (2015)	Controlled Substance Analogue Enforcement Act of 1986 • knowledge requirement		Thomas
	Horne v. Department of Agriculture	576 U.S. ___ (2015)	Agricultural Marketing Agreement Act of 1937 • National Raisin Reserve • Fifth Amendment • Takings Clause	Scalia, Kennedy, Thomas, Alito; Ginsburg, Breyer, Kagan (in part)	Thomas; Breyer; Sotomayor
	King v. Burwell	576 U.S. ___ (2015)	Patient Protection and Affordable Care Act • federally established health care exchanges • federal tax credit subsidies for individual purchase of health insurance	Kennedy, Ginsburg, Breyer, Sotomayor, Kagan	Scalia
	Obergefell v. Hodges	576 U.S. ___ (2015)	same-sex marriage • Fourteenth Amendment • Due Process Clause • Equal Protection Clause	Scalia, Thomas	Kennedy; Scalia; Thomas; Alito
	Arizona State Legislature v. Arizona Independent Redistricting Comm'n	576 U.S. ___ (2015)	Elections Clause • legislative redistricting • Arizona Proposition 106 (2000) • gerrymandering • Article III • standing of legislature to bring suit	Scalia, Thomas, Alito	Ginsburg; Scalia; Thomas
