= 2014 term United States Supreme Court opinions of Elena Kagan =

The 2014 term of the Supreme Court of the United States began October 6, 2014, and concluded October 4, 2015. This was the fifth term of Associate Justice Elena Kagan's tenure on the Court.
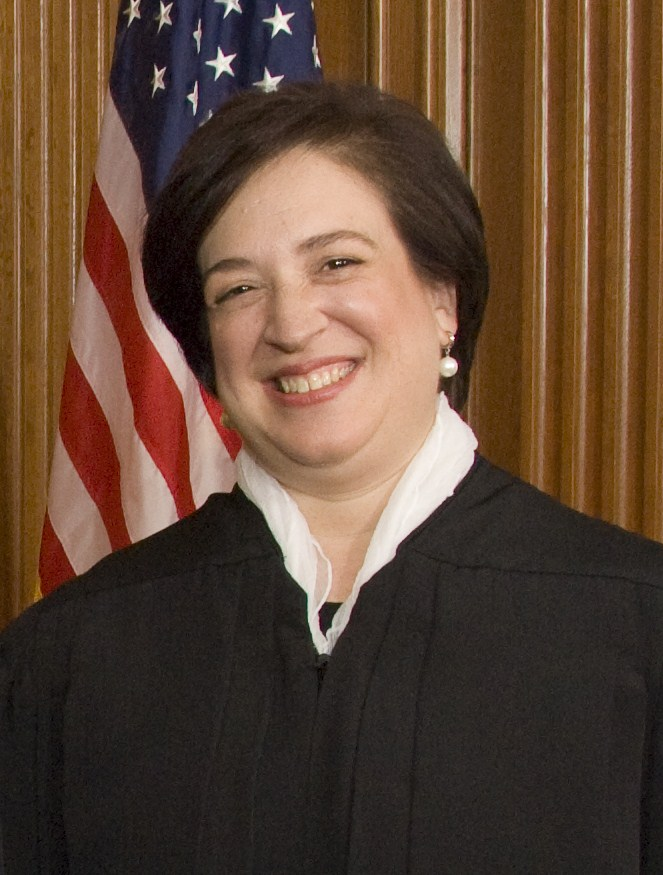

Elena Kagan 2014 term statistics

7	Majority or plurality	2	Concurrence	1	Other
2	Dissent	0	Concurrence/dissent	Total =	12
Bench opinions = 11		Opinions relating to orders = 1		In-chambers opinions = 0
Unanimous opinions: 2		Most joined by: Ginsburg (11)		Least joined by: Thomas (3)

Type	Case	Citation	Issues	Joined by	Other opinions
	Joseph v. United States	574 U.S. 1038 (2014)	forfeiture of arguments on appeal • review of courts of appeals rules of procedure	Ginsburg, Breyer	
Kagan filed a statement respecting the Court's denial of certiorari.
	Heien v. North Carolina	574 U.S. 68 (2014)	Fourth Amendment • reasonableness of search • mistake of law by police	Ginsburg	Roberts; Sotomayor
	Kansas v. Nebraska	574 U.S. 445 (2015)	Republican River Compact	Kennedy, Ginsburg, Breyer, Sotomayor; Roberts (in part)	Roberts; Scalia; Thomas
	Yates v. United States	574 U.S. 552 (2015)	catching of undersized fish • destruction of tangible object to impede federal investigation	Scalia, Kennedy, Thomas	Ginsburg; Alito
	Omnicare, Inc. v. Laborers Dist. Council Constr. Industry Pension Fund	575 U.S. 175 (2015)	Securities Act of 1933 • opinions in registration statement later proved incorrect	Roberts, Kennedy, Ginsburg, Breyer, Alito, Sotomayor	Scalia; Thomas
	United States v. Kwai Fun Wong	575 U.S. 402 (2015)	Federal Tort Claims Act • statute of limitations • equitable tolling	Kennedy, Ginsburg, Breyer, Sotomayor	Alito
	Mach Mining, LLC v. EEOC	575 U.S. 480 (2015)	Title VII • judicial review of Equal Employment Opportunity Commission fulfillment of conciliation obligation	Unanimous	
	Henderson v. United States	575 U.S. 622 (2015)	federal prohibition on felon possession of firearms • transfer of firearms to third party	Unanimous	
	Reyes Mata v. Lynch	576 U.S. 143 (2015)	immigration law • motion to reopen removal proceedings • court of appeals jurisdiction to review Board of Immigration Appeals actions	Roberts, Scalia, Kennedy, Ginsburg, Breyer, Alito, Sotomayor	Thomas
	Reed v. Town of Gilbert	576 U.S. 179 (2015)	First Amendment • free speech • content-based restrictions • regulation of signs on private property	Ginsburg, Breyer	Thomas; Breyer; Alito
	Kimble v. Marvel Entertainment, LLC	576 U.S. 446 (2015)	patent law • post-expiration royalty payments • stare decisis	Scalia, Kennedy, Ginsburg, Breyer, Sotomayor	Alito
	Michigan v. EPA	576 U.S. 765 (2015)	Clean Air Act • regulation of power plant emissions • relevance of cost to decision to regulate	Ginsburg, Breyer, Sotomayor	Scalia; Thomas
