= 2014 term United States Supreme Court opinions of Stephen Breyer =

The 2014 term of the Supreme Court of the United States began October 6, 2014, and concluded October 4, 2015. This was the twenty-first term of Associate Justice Stephen Breyer's tenure on the Court.
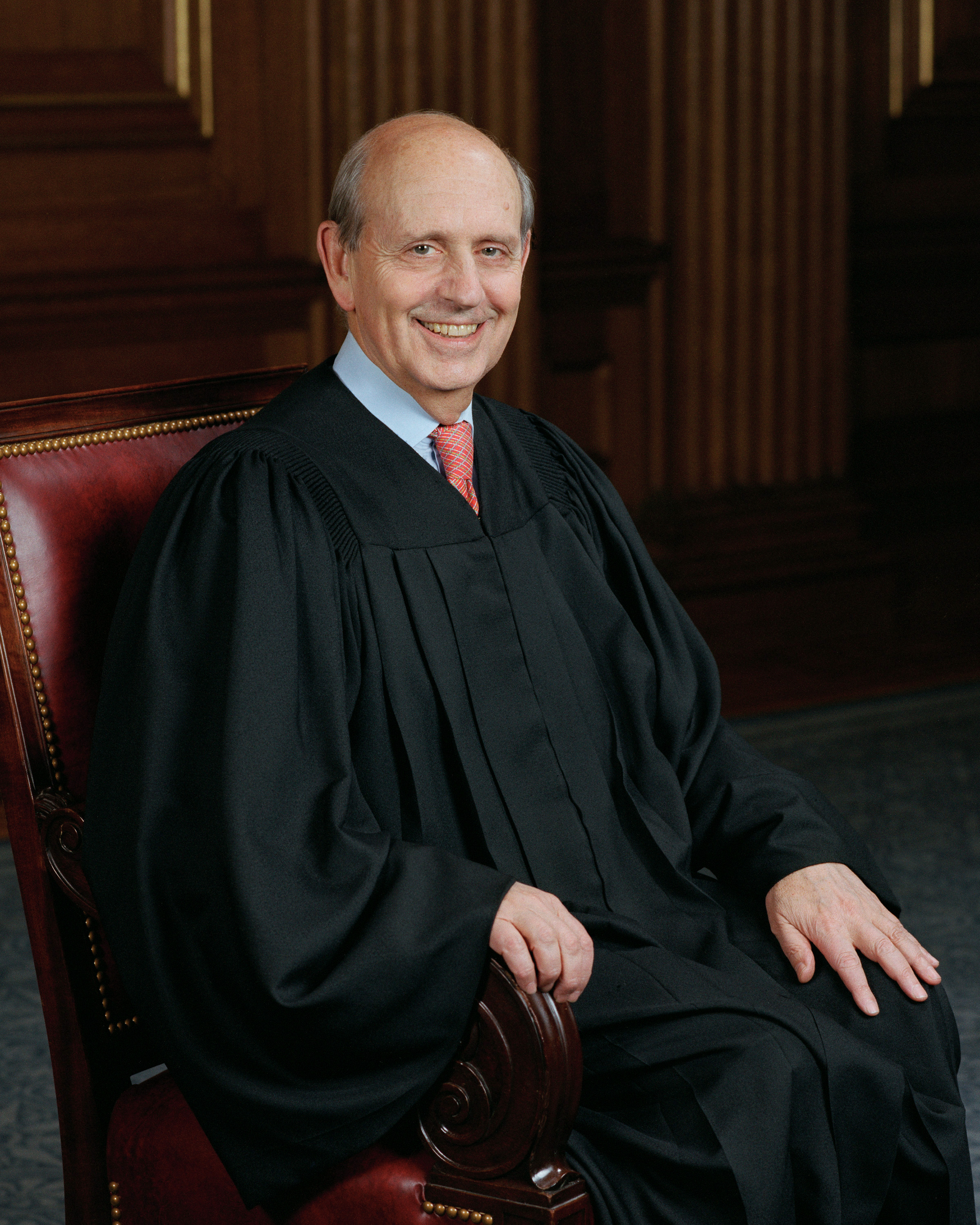

Stephen Breyer 2014 term statistics

8	Majority or plurality	4	Concurrence	0	Other
4	Dissent	1	Concurrence/dissent	Total =	17
Bench opinions = 16		Opinions relating to orders = 1		In-chambers opinions = 0
Unanimous opinions: 2		Most joined by: Ginsburg (13)		Least joined by: Scalia, Alito (3)

Type	Case	Citation	Issues	Joined by	Other opinions
	Teva Pharmaceuticals USA, Inc. v. Sandoz, Inc.	574 U.S. ___ (2015)	patent law • claim construction • appellate standard of review • Federal Rules of Civil Procedure	Roberts, Scalia, Kennedy, Ginsburg, Sotomayor, Kagan	Thomas
	Bower v. Texas	575 U.S. ___ (2015)	death penalty • consideration of mitigating evidence at sentencing	Ginsburg, Sotomayor	
Breyer dissented from the Court's denial of certiorari.
	Young v. United Parcel Service, Inc.	575 U.S. ___ (2015)	Pregnancy Discrimination Act • disparate treatment claim	Roberts, Ginsburg, Sotomayor, Kagan	Alito; Scalia; Kennedy
	Alabama Legislative Black Caucus v. Alabama	575 U.S. ___ (2015)	Fourteenth Amendment • Equal Protection Clause • redistricting • racial gerrymandering • Voting Rights Act of 1965	Kennedy, Ginsburg, Sotomayor, Kagan	Scalia; Thomas
	Armstrong v. Exceptional Child Center, Inc.	575 U.S. ___ (2015)	Medicaid • Supremacy Clause • implied right of action		Scalia; Sotomayor
	Oneok, Inc. v. Learjet, Inc.	575 U.S. ___ (2015)	Natural Gas Act • federal preemption of state antitrust laws	Kennedy, Ginsburg, Alito, Sotomayor, Kagan; Thomas (in part)	Thomas; Scalia
	Williams-Yulee v. Florida Bar	575 U.S. ___ (2015)	First Amendment • freedom of speech • ban on personal solicitation of campaign funds by judicial candidates		Roberts; Ginsburg; Scalia; Kennedy; Alito
	Tibble v. Edison Int'l	575 U.S. ___ (2015)	Employee Retirement Income Security Act • breach of fiduciary duty • statute of limitations	Unanimous	
	Coleman v. Tollefson	575 U.S. ___ (2015)	in forma pauperis filing status • ineligibility after dismissals of three frivolous suits • effect of pending appeal	Unanimous	
	Zivotofsky v. Kerry	576 U.S. ___ (2015)	political question doctrine • U.S. position on status of Jerusalem • Foreign Relations Authorization Act, Fiscal Year 2003 • passport designation of births in Jerusalem		Kennedy; Thomas; Roberts; Scalia
Breyer stated that he continued to believe the case presented a nonjusticiable political question, but joined the Court's opinion because its precedent in Zivotofsky v. Clinton (from which he had dissented) precluded resolving the case on that ground.
	Kerry v. Din	576 U.S. ___ (2015)	Immigration and Nationality Act • exclusion of alien for terrorist activities • denial of spouse's visa • Due Process Clause • substantive due process • liberty interest in marriage	Ginsburg, Sotomayor, Kagan	Scalia; Kennedy
	Baker Botts L.L.P. v. ASARCO LLC	576 U.S. ___ (2015)	bankruptcy law • Chapter 11 • attorney's fee application • award of attorneys fees for defending application • American Rule	Ginsburg, Kagan	Thomas; Sotomayor
	Reed v. Town of Gilbert	576 U.S. ___ (2015)	First Amendment • free speech • content-based restrictions • regulation of signs on private property		Thomas; Alito; Kagan
	Walker v. Texas Div., Sons of Confederate Veterans, Inc.	576 U.S. ___ (2015)	First Amendment • free speech • government speech • specialty license plates	Thomas, Ginsburg, Sotomayor, Kagan	Alito
	Horne v. Department of Agriculture	576 U.S. ___ (2015)	Agricultural Marketing Agreement Act of 1937 • National Raisin Reserve • Fifth Amendment • Takings Clause	Ginsburg, Kagan	Roberts; Thomas; Sotomayor
	Kingsley v. Hendrickson	576 U.S. ___ (2015)	Fourteenth Amendment • Due Process Clause • excessive force against pretrial detainee	Kennedy, Ginsburg, Sotomayor, Kagan	Scalia; Alito
	Glossip v. Gross	576 U.S. ___ (2015)	Eighth Amendment • death penalty • use of midazolam in lethal injection	Ginsburg	Alito; Scalia; Thomas; Sotomayor
