= 2014 term United States Supreme Court opinions of Ruth Bader Ginsburg =

The 2014 term of the Supreme Court of the United States began October 6, 2014, and concluded October 4, 2015. This was the twenty-second term of Associate Justice Ruth Bader Ginsburg's tenure on the Court.
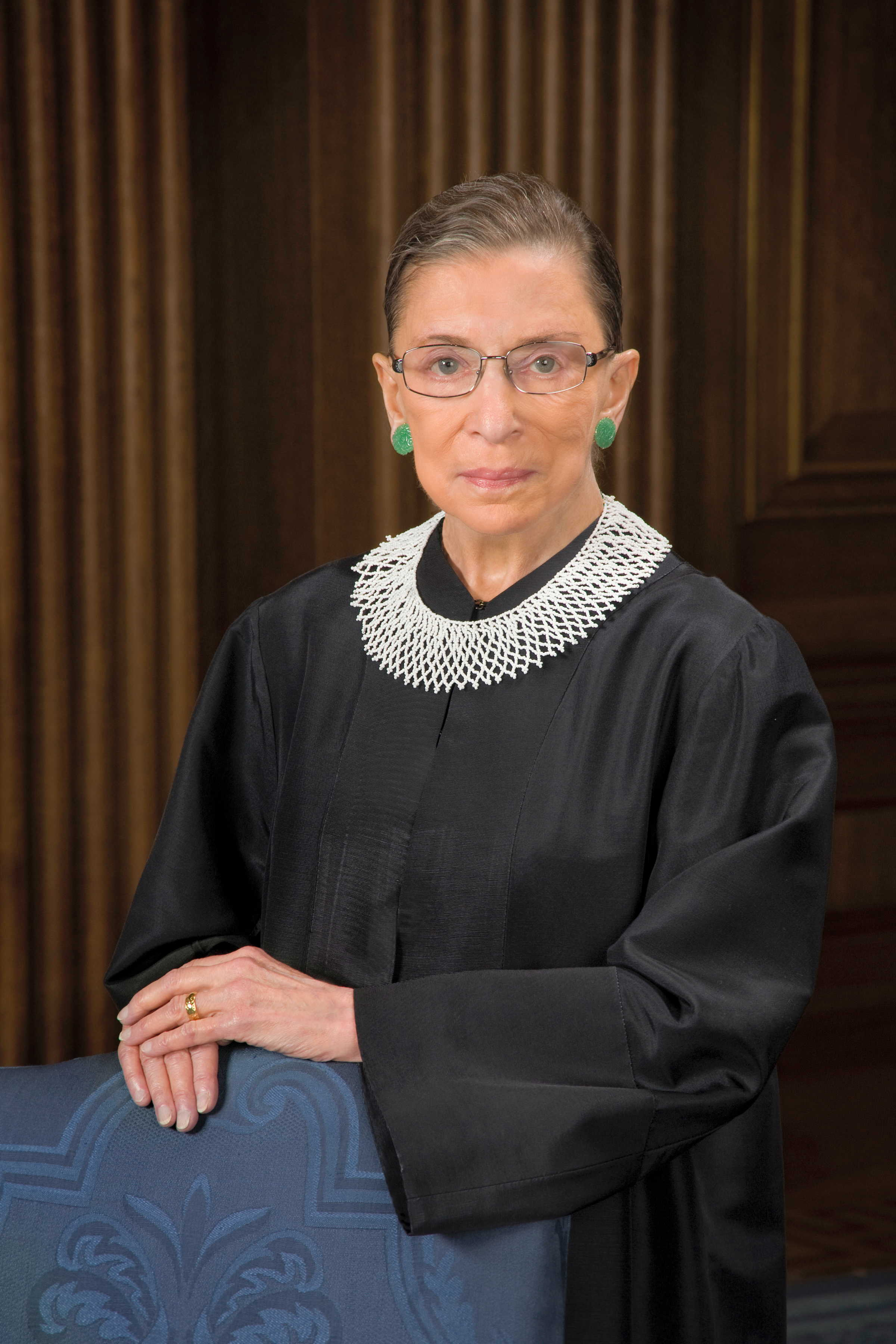

Ruth Bader Ginsburg 2014 term statistics

7	Majority or plurality	6	Concurrence	0	Other
3	Dissent	0	Concurrence/dissent	Total =	16
Bench opinions = 13		Opinions relating to orders = 3		In-chambers opinions = 0
Unanimous opinions: 2		Most joined by: Sotomayor (11 in full, 1 in part)		Least joined by: Thomas (2)

Type	Case	Citation	Issues	Joined by	Other opinions
	North Carolina v. League of Women Voters of North Carolina	574 U.S. 927 (2014)	Voting Rights Act of 1965	Sotomayor	
Ginsburg dissented from the Court's granting of a stay pending the filing of a petition for certiorari.
	Veasey v. Perry	574 U.S. 951 (2014)	state voter identification law	Sotomayor, Kagan	
Ginsburg dissented from the Court's denial of an application to vacate a stay.
	Dart Cherokee Basin Operating Co. v. Owens	574 U.S. 81 (2014)	removal jurisdiction • sufficiency of allegations • jurisdiction over denial of appeal	Roberts, Breyer, Alito, Sotomayor	Scalia; Thomas
	Holt v. Hobbs	574 U.S. 370 (2015)	Religious Land Use and Institutionalized Persons Act • prison regulation of beard growth • Islamic beard customs	Sotomayor	Alito; Sotomayor
	Gelboim v. Bank of America Corp.	574 U.S. 405 (2015)	appellate jurisdiction over final decisions • finality of dismissal of case from pending multidistrict litigation	Unanimous	
	M&G Polymers USA, LLC v. Tackett	574 U.S. 443 (2015)	Employee Retirement Income Security Act • Labor Management Relations Act • interpretation of collective bargaining agreements	Breyer, Sotomayor, Kagan	Thomas
	Yates v. United States	574 U.S. 528 (2015)	catching of undersized fish • destruction of tangible object to impede federal investigation	Roberts, Breyer, Sotomayor	Alito; Kagan
	Direct Marketing Assn. v. Brohl	575 U.S. 19 (2015)	Tax Injunction Act • state collection of online sales tax • online retailer reporting requirements	Breyer; Sotomayor (in part)	Thomas; Kennedy
	B&B Hardware, Inc. v. Hargis Industries, Inc.	575 U.S. 160 (2015)	trademark law • issue preclusion • adjudication by Trademark Trial and Appeal Board		Alito; Thomas
	Rodriguez v. United States	575 U.S. 348 (2015)	Fourth Amendment • traffic stop • dog sniff of car for drugs • reasonable suspicion	Roberts, Scalia, Breyer, Sotomayor, Kagan	Kennedy; Thomas; Alito
	Williams-Yulee v. Florida Bar	575 U.S. 457 (2015)	First Amendment • freedom of speech • ban on personal solicitation of campaign funds by judicial candidates	Breyer (in part)	Roberts; Breyer; Scalia; Kennedy; Alito
	Harris v. Viegelahn	575 U.S. 510 (2015)	conversion of Chapter 13 bankruptcy case to Chapter 7 • return of post-petition wages not distributed by Chapter 13 trustee	Unanimous	
	Comptroller of Treasury of Md. v. Wynne	575 U.S. 581 (2015)	state credit for income tax paid to other states • Dormant Commerce Clause • internal consistency test	Scalia, Kagan	Alito; Scalia; Thomas
	Mellouli v. Lynch	575 U.S. 798 (2015)	removal of alien for state law drug paraphernalia conviction	Roberts, Scalia, Kennedy, Breyer, Sotomayor, Kagan	Thomas
	Hittson v. Chatman	576 U.S. 1028 (2015)	Antiterrorism and Effective Death Penalty Act of 1996 • review where last decision was unexplained order	Kagan	
Ginsburg concurred in the Court's denial of certiorari.
	Arizona State Legislature v. Arizona Independent Redistricting Comm'n	576 U.S. 787 (2015)	Elections Clause • legislative redistricting • Arizona Proposition 106 (2000) • gerrymandering • Article III • standing of legislature to bring suit	Kennedy, Breyer, Sotomayor, Kagan	Roberts; Scalia; Thomas
