= McFadden v. United States =

- Supreme Court of the United States

Argued April 21, 2015 Decided June 18, 2015
- Full case name: Stephen Dominick McFadden, Petitioner v. United States
- Docket no.: 14-378
- Citations: 576 U.S. 186 (more) 135 S. Ct. 2298; 192 L. Ed. 2d 260
- Argument: Oral argument
- Opinion announcement: Opinion announcement

Case history
- Prior: United States v. McFadden, 15 F. Supp. 3d 668 (W.D. Va. 2013); affirmed, 753 F.3d 432 (4th Cir. 2014); cert. granted, 135 S. Ct. 2298 (2015).

Holding
- Under §841(a)(1) of the Controlled Substances Act, the government must prove the defendant knew he was dealing with a controlled substance when it is an analogue. United States Court of Appeals for the Fourth Circuit vacated and remanded.

Court membership
- Chief Justice John Roberts Associate Justices Antonin Scalia · Anthony Kennedy; Clarence Thomas · Ruth Bader Ginsburg; Stephen Breyer · Samuel Alito; Sonia Sotomayor · Elena Kagan

Case opinions
- Majority: Thomas, joined by Scalia, Kennedy, Ginsburg, Breyer, Alito, Sotomayor, Kagan
- Concurrence: Roberts (in part)

Laws applied
- Controlled Substances Act; Federal Analogue Act

McFadden v. United States, 576 U.S. 186 (2015), was a United States Supreme Court case in which the Court held that section 841 of the Controlled Substances Act requires the government to prove that to be in criminal violation, a defendant must be aware that an analogue defined by the Controlled Substance Analogue Enforcement Act with which he was dealing was a controlled substance.

== Background ==
=== Controlled substances law ===
The Controlled Substances Act regulates the manufacture, importation, possession, and distribution of certain substances determined in part by the original legislation and in part by the DEA and FDA. Under §841(a)(1), the Act makes it "unlawful for any person knowingly...to distribute...a controlled substance."

The Controlled Substance Analogue Enforcement Act of 1986 extends the provisions for Schedule I controlled substances to all "controlled substance analogues" of those substances when intended for human consumption, instructing courts to treat them as the same.

=== Trial of McFadden ===
In 2012, Stephen McFadden was indicted in the U.S. District Court for the Western District of Virginia on one count of conspiracy to distribute and eight counts of distribution of controlled substance analogues intended for human consumption to another distributor in Charlottesville, Virginia. These substances were designer drugs known as "bath salts," specifically methylone, MDPV, and 4-MEC, considered to be illicit analogues under the Analogue Act. On January 10, 2013, McFadden was found guilty by a jury on all counts and was sentenced to 33 months of imprisonment and 30 months of supervised release.

A motion for judgment of acquittal on the grounds that the Analogue Act was unconstitutionally vague, the court's instruction of the jury was improper, the admission of expert testimony was improper, and the evidence supporting his conviction was insufficient was denied by Chief Judge Glen E. Conrad.

=== Appeal of judgment ===
McFadden appealed the lower court's judgment to the U.S. Court of Appeals for the Fourth Circuit on the grounds that the Analogue Act was unconstitutionally vague, evidentiary rulings were an improper use of the court's discretion, and that the government failed to prove the substances being distributed were controlled analogues.

The court rejected the argument that the statute was unconstitutionally vague as a person of "common intelligence" could, indeed, understand the actions prohibited by the statute, specifically the distribution of analogues "substantially similar" to those banned by the Controlled Substances Act. The court also agreed with the district court in rejecting McFadden's claim that the statutory term "human consumption" was unconstitutionally vague as it was defined by statute. The Court determined the phrase could be given an ordinary meaning. In a final determination about vagueness of the statute, the court further rejected the argument that the term "substantially similar" is impermissibly vague.

The appeals court also rejected McFadden's argument that the judge had improperly failed to instruct the jury that the government is required to prove that he had knowledge or deliberately avoided knowledge that the substances in question were controlled substance analogues covered under the Analogue Act.

Lastly, the court upheld the lower court's denial of a motion for judgment of acquittal.

The Fourth Circuit Court of Appeals upheld the district court's judgment in a unanimous opinion written by Judge Barbara Milano Keenan and joined by Chief Judge William Byrd Traxler and Judge. J. Harvie Wilkinson

Petition for a writ of certiorari was granted by the Supreme Court on January 16, 2015.

== Judgment of the Court ==
In a unanimous 9–0 decision, the Supreme Court ruled that the government is required to prove that the defendant had knowledge that the substances were regulated by §841(a)(1) of the Controlled Substances Act as controlled substance analogues under the Controlled Substance Analogue Enforcement Act.

Justice Thomas wrote for the majority, joined by Justices Scalia, Kennedy, Ginsburg, Breyer, Alito, Sotomayor, and Kagan, that either knowledge that a substance is controlled without knowing the substance itself, or knowledge of the substance but not that it is controlled is sufficient to satisfy the statutory requirement of intent. The opinion re-iterated that ignorance of the law is not a valid excuse.

Chief Justice Roberts concurred with the judgment and in part. He wrote in his concurring opinion that knowledge of the substance itself does not satisfy the statutory knowledge requirement. Therefore, ignorance of the law is a valid defense because the defendant could lack knowledge that the substance is controlled.

The decision of the court of appeals was vacated and the case was remanded back to the Fourth Circuit to consider the jury instructions as failing to convey the Analogue Act's requirement of assessing the defendant's knowledge of the substances as controlled.

== See also ==
- List of United States Supreme Court cases, volume 576
- Controlled Substances Act
- Federal Analogue Act
