= Integrity Staffing Solutions, Inc. v. Busk =

- Supreme Court of the United States

Argued October 8, 2014 Decided December 9, 2014
- Full case name: Integrity Staffing Solutions, Inc. v. Jesse Busk, et al.
- Docket no.: 13-433
- Citations: 574 U.S. 27 (more) 135 S. Ct. 513; 190 L. Ed. 2d 410
- Argument: Oral argument
- Opinion announcement: Opinion announcement

Case history
- Prior: Busk v. Integrity Staffing Solutions, Inc., 713 F.3d 525 (9th Cir. 2013).

Holding
- Activities that are not integral and indispensable to the principal activities of a job are not compensable under the Fair Labor Standards Act.

Court membership
- Chief Justice John Roberts Associate Justices Antonin Scalia · Anthony Kennedy; Clarence Thomas · Ruth Bader Ginsburg; Stephen Breyer · Samuel Alito; Sonia Sotomayor · Elena Kagan

Case opinions
- Majority: Thomas, joined by unanimous
- Concurrence: Sotomayor, joined by Kagan

Laws applied
- Fair Labor Standards Act

Integrity Staffing Solutions, Inc. v. Busk, 574 U.S. 27 (2014), was a unanimous decision by the United States Supreme Court, ruling that time spent by workers waiting to undergo anti-employee theft security screenings is not "integral and indispensable" to their work, and thus not compensable under the Fair Labor Standards Act (FLSA). The Court delivered their ruling on December 9, 2014.

== Background ==
Jesse Busk was among several workers employed by the temp agency Integrity Staffing Solutions to work in Amazon.com's warehouse in Nevada to help package and fulfill orders. At the end of each day, they had to spend about 25 minutes waiting to undergo anti-theft security checks before leaving. Busk and his fellow workers sued their employer, claiming they were entitled to be paid for those 25 minutes under the Fair Labor Standards Act. They argued that the time waiting could have been reduced if more screeners were added, or shifts were staggered so workers did not have to wait for the checks at the same time. Furthermore, since the checks were made to prevent employee theft, they only benefited the employers and the customers, not the employees themselves.

The District Court originally dismissed the case, ruling that the security checks were made after the regular work shift and therefore not "an integral and indispensable part" of the job. The Ninth Circuit disagreed, ruling that the checks were necessary to the principal work of the job.

== Opinion of the Court ==
Justice Clarence Thomas delivered the unanimous judgment of the Court. He wrote that "an activity is integral and indispensable to the principal activities that an employee is employed to perform — and thus compensable under the FLSA — if it is an intrinsic element of those activities and one with which the employee cannot dispense if he is to perform his principal activities". Thomas then argued that the security checks were not integral to Busk's job because they could be eliminated without adversely affecting the required work. In addition, the time waiting could have been reduced if the employer hired more screeners or stagger work shifts, which also would not adversely affect the required work.

== Concurring opinion ==
Justice Sonia Sotomayor, joined by Justice Elena Kagan, delivered a concurring opinion, emphasizing that any activity related to worker safety and efficiency is also "integral and indispensable" and therefore should still remain covered. However, the security checks did not have anything to do with worker safety and efficiency.

== See also ==
- List of United States Supreme Court cases
- List of United States Supreme Court cases, volume 574
