= Reyes Mata v. Lynch =

- Supreme Court of the United States

Argued April 29, 2015 Decided June 15, 2015
- Full case name: Noel Reyes Mata, Petitioner v. Loretta E. Lynch, Attorney General
- Docket no.: 14-185
- Citations: 576 U.S. 143 (more) 135 S. Ct. 2150; 192 L. Ed. 2d 225
- Argument: Oral argument
- Opinion announcement: Opinion announcement

Case history
- Prior: Board of Immigration Appeals order no. A200 723 795; appeal denied, Reyes Mata v. Holder, 558 F. App'x 366 (5th Cir. 2014); cert. granted, 135 S. Ct. 1039 (2015).

Holding
- The court of appeals has jurisdiction to review the Board of Immigration Appeals rejection of a motion to reopen.

Court membership
- Chief Justice John Roberts Associate Justices Antonin Scalia · Anthony Kennedy; Clarence Thomas · Ruth Bader Ginsburg; Stephen Breyer · Samuel Alito; Sonia Sotomayor · Elena Kagan

Case opinions
- Majority: Kagan, joined by Roberts, Scalia, Kennedy, Ginsburg, Breyer, Alito, Sotomayor
- Dissent: Thomas

Reyes Mata v. Lynch, 576 U.S. 143 (2015), is a United States Supreme Court case in which the Court ruled that the federal courts of appeals have jurisdiction to review the orders of the Board of Immigration Appeals to reject motions to reopen.

== Background ==
=== Board of Immigration Appeals' decision ===
Noel Reyes Mata, an unlawful resident alien, was convicted of assault in a Texas state court and deported in 2010 to Mexico, the country of which he was a citizen. He filed a notice of appeal with the Board of Immigration Appeals, an administrative court within the Executive Office for Immigration Review of the U.S. Department of Justice, which was dismissed on the basis that Mata's attorney failed to submit an appellate brief. Mata subsequently moved to reopen the case on the grounds that he had received ineffective assistance of counsel, a statutorily exceptional circumstance that entitled him to equitable tolling, although he had missed the 90-day window to move for reopening. The BIA dismissed the motion, ruled it untimely, and declined to reopen the case sua sponte under its regulatory authority as per Title 8 of the Code of Federal Regulations.

=== Judicial appeal ===
Mata appealed the BIA's decision to the United States Court of Appeals for the Fifth Circuit in Reyes Mata v. Holder. He argued that the receipt of ineffective counsel deprived him of his due process rights, which should have preempted the untimeliness of his motion, entitling him to equitable tolling of time. The Fifth Circuit recharacterized Mata's argument for equitable tolling as an invitation for the BIA to exercise its regulatory authority sua sponte. Since judicial precedent bars courts of appeals from reviewing BIA decisions on the exercise of such authority, the Fifth Circuit dismissed Mata's appeal for lack of jurisdiction. The opinion by Judges Barksdale, Haynes, and Higginson was delivered per curiam.

== Judgment of the Court ==
The Supreme Court of the United States granted certiorari and heard the arguments of the case on April 29, 2015. The question at hand was whether the Fifth Circuit erred in ruling that it lacked jurisdiction to review the Board of Immigration Appeals decision to decline waiving the 90-day filing deadline. On June 15, 2015, the Court delivered its 8–1 opinion, written by Justice Kagan and joined by Chief Justice Roberts and Justices Scalia, Kennedy, Ginsburg, Breyer, Alito, and Sotomayor.

It held that the Fifth Circuit court erred in declining to take jurisdiction. The courts of appeals, in fact, possess jurisdiction to review the BIA's decisions to reopen, including when the motion to reopen is untimely and when the petitioner is seeking equitable tolling. Not ruling on whether the Fifth Circuit has adequate jurisdiction to review sua sponte decisions by the BIA to reopen, the Court held that the correct disposition of the appellate court was to take jurisdiction and affirm the BIA's denial if the case was not entitled to reopening on the merits. The Court affirmed the "virtually unflagging obligation" of federal courts to assert jurisdiction where it has authority.

Justice Thomas dissented and stated that before determining whether it possess jurisdiction, the Fifth Circuit should have first construed Mata's ambiguous motion as either invoking statutory relief or requesting the BIA to act on its sua sponte authority.
