= Department of Homeland Security v. MacLean =

- Supreme Court of the United States

Decided January 21, 2015
- Full case name: Department of Homeland Security v. MacLean
- Citations: 574 U.S. 383 (more)

Holding
- A whistleblower disclosure that is specifically prohibited by a rule or regulation is permitted because the disclosure is not "specifically prohibited by law" within the meaning of the statute protecting whistleblowers.

Court membership
- Chief Justice John Roberts Associate Justices Antonin Scalia · Anthony Kennedy; Clarence Thomas · Ruth Bader Ginsburg; Stephen Breyer · Samuel Alito; Sonia Sotomayor · Elena Kagan

Case opinions
- Majority: Roberts, joined by Scalia, Thomas, Ginsburg, Breyer, Alito, Kagan
- Dissent: Sotomayor, joined by Kennedy

Laws applied
- 5 U.S.C. § 2302(b)

Department of Homeland Security v. MacLean, 574 U.S. 383 (2015), was a United States Supreme Court case in which the court held that a whistleblower disclosure that is specifically prohibited by a rule or regulation is permitted because the disclosure is not "specifically prohibited by law" within the meaning of the statute protecting whistleblowers.

== Background ==
In 2002, Congress enacted the Homeland Security Act. That act provides that the Transportation Security Administration (TSA) "shall prescribe regulations prohibiting the disclosure of information... if the Under Secretary decides that disclosur[e] would... be detrimental to the security of transportation." (Note: 49 U. S. C. §114(r)(1)(C).) Around the same time, the TSA promulgated regulations prohibiting the unauthorized disclosure of "sensitive security information," (Note: 67 Fed. Reg. 8351.) which included "[s]pecific details of aviation security measures . . . [such as] information concerning specific numbers of Federal Air Marshals, deployments or missions, and the methods involved in such operations." (Note: 49 CFR §1520.7(j).)

In July 2003, the TSA briefed all federal air marshals—including Robert J. MacLean—about a potential plot to hijack passenger flights. A few days after the briefing, MacLean received from the TSA a text message cancelling all overnight missions from Las Vegas until early August. MacLean, who was stationed in Las Vegas, believed that cancelling those missions during a hijacking alert was dangerous and illegal. He therefore contacted a reporter and told him about the TSA's decision to cancel the missions. After discovering that MacLean was the source of the disclosure, the TSA fired him for disclosing sensitive security information without authorization.

MacLean challenged his firing before the Merit Systems Protection Board. He argued that his disclosure was whistleblowing activity under 5 U.S.C. §2302(b)(8)(A), which protects employees who disclose information that reveals "any violation of any law, rule, or regulation," or "a substantial and specific danger to public health or safety." The Board held that MacLean did not qualify for protection under that statute because his disclosure was "specifically prohibited by law"—namely, by the Homeland Security Act. The Court of Appeals for the Federal Circuit vacated the Board's decision, holding that Section 114(r)(1) was not a prohibition within the meaning of the statute protecting whistleblowers.

== Opinion of the court ==
The Supreme Court issued an opinion on January 21, 2015.

The exception to whistleblower protections provided by 5 U.S.C. 2302(b)(8)(A), covering disclosures specifically prohibited by law, does not encompass disclosures prohibited by rules and regulations because an agency could protect itself from any whistleblowing activities by creating a regulation prohibiting whistleblowing.
