= Jennings v. Stephens =

- Supreme Court of the United States

Decided January 14, 2015
- Full case name: Jennings v. Stephens
- Citations: 574 U.S. 271 (more)

Holding
- In a federal habeas proceeding, a criminal defendant may argue a defense of the district court's judgment on alternative grounds without first taking a cross-appeal or obtaining a certificate of appealability unless doing so would enlarge the defendant's rights under the district court's judgment.

Court membership
- Chief Justice John Roberts Associate Justices Antonin Scalia · Anthony Kennedy; Clarence Thomas · Ruth Bader Ginsburg; Stephen Breyer · Samuel Alito; Sonia Sotomayor · Elena Kagan

Case opinions
- Majority: Scalia
- Dissent: Thomas, joined by Kennedy, Alito

Jennings v. Stephens, 574 U.S. 271 (2015), was a United States Supreme Court case in which the court held that in a federal habeas proceeding, a criminal defendant may argue a defense of the district court's judgment on alternative grounds without first taking a cross-appeal or obtaining a certificate of appealability unless doing so would enlarge the defendant's rights under the district court's judgment.

== Background ==
Robert Mitchell Jennings sought federal habeas relief based on three theories of ineffective assistance of counsel during the punishment phase of his state capital-murder trial. The district court granted relief on his two theories under Wiggins v. Smith—that counsel failed to present evidence of a deprived background and failed to investigate evidence of mental impairment—but not on his third theory under Smith v. Spisak—that counsel expressed resignation to a death sentence during his closing argument. The court ordered Texas to release Jennings unless, within 120 days, the State granted him a new sentencing hearing or commuted his death sentence. The State attacked the Wiggins theories on appeal, but Jennings defended on all three theories. The Fifth Circuit Court of Appeals reversed the grant of habeas corpus under the two Wiggins theories and determined that it lacked jurisdiction over the Spisak claim. Implicitly concluding that raising this argument required a cross-appeal, the court noted that Jennings neither filed a timely notice of appeal nor obtained the certificate of appealability as required.
