= M&G Polymers USA, LLC v. Tackett =

- Supreme Court of the United States

Argued November 10, 2024 Decided January 26, 2015
- Full case name: M&G Polymers USA, LLC, et al., v. Hobert Freel Tackett, et al.
- Docket no.: 13A753
- Citations: 574 U.S. 427 (more)
- Argument: Oral argument
- Decision: Opinion

Questions presented
- When courts interpret collective bargaining agreements as part of LMRA claims, how should they interpret silence as to the duration of retiree healthcare benefits within the agreement?

Holding
- The interpretation of collective bargaining agreements must follow ordinary contract principles when that interpretation does not conflict with federal labor policy.

Court membership
- Chief Justice John Roberts Associate Justices Antonin Scalia · Anthony Kennedy; Clarence Thomas · Ruth Bader Ginsburg; Stephen Breyer · Samuel Alito; Sonia Sotomayor · Elena Kagan

Case opinions
- Majority: Thomas, joined by unanimous
- Concurrence: Ginsburg, joined by Breyer, Sotomayor, Kagan

Laws applied
- Taft-Hartley Act; Employee Retirement Income Security Act of 1974

M&G Polymers USA, LLC v. Tackett, 574 U.S. 427 (2015), was a United States Supreme Court case in which the court held that the interpretation of collective-bargaining agreements must follow ordinary contract principles when that interpretation does not conflict with federal labor policy.

== Background ==
When M&G Polymers USA, LLC (M&G), purchased the Point Pleasant Polyester Plant in 2000, it entered a collective-bargaining agreement and related Pension, Insurance, and Service Award Agreement (P & I agreement) with the plant workers' union. The P & I agreement provided that certain retirees, along with their surviving spouses and dependents, would "receive a full Company contribution towards the cost of [health care] benefits"; that such benefits would be provided "for the duration of [the] Agreement"; and that the agreement would be subject to renegotiation in three years.

Following the expiration of those agreements, M&G announced that it would require retirees to contribute to the cost of their health care benefits. The retirees, on behalf of themselves and others similarly situated, sued M&G and related entities, alleging that the P & I agreement created a vested right to lifetime contribution-free health care benefits. One of these retirees was Hobert Freel Tackett.

The federal District Court dismissed the complaint for failure to state a claim, but the Sixth Circuit Court of Appeals reversed based on the reasoning of its earlier decision in International Union, United Auto, Aerospace, & Agricultural Implement Workers of Am. v. Yard-Man, Inc.. On remand, the District Court ruled in favor of the retirees, and the Sixth Circuit affirmed.

== Opinion of the court ==
The Supreme Court issued an opinion on January 26, 2015.

One of the sections criticized how the sixth circuit inferred from the fact that there were termination provisions for other benefits and not for retiree benefits expressed an intent to vest those benefits for life. The opinion also spoke about how the sixth circuit then relied on the fact that without those benefits being vested for life, the promise of those benefits would become illusory for the employees for who would not have qualified for the benefits before the contracts expired. It also criticized how the sixth circuit chose to resolve those ambiguities based on the context of the labor negotiations.

== Subsequent developments ==
On February 20, 2018, in another similar case involving a company and employee benefits, the Supreme Court once again ruled against the sixth circuit ruling. In this case, CNH Industrial offered its employees healthcare benefits for employees who retire under a certain pension plan under an agreement which had a general termination due date in May 2004. In 2004, when the agreement expired, the retired CNH employees sued.

When this case was pending, the Supreme Court ruled on M&G Polymers USA, LLC v. Tackett. But the lower courts ruled in favor of the retired employees saying that the benefits were vested for life. But Supreme Court ruled that the decision did not comply with the M&G Polymers USA, LLC v. Tackett direction to apply ordinary contract principles.
