= Ohio v. Clark =

- Supreme Court of the United States

Argued March 2, 2015 Decided June 18, 2015
- Full case name: Ohio v. Darius Clark
- Docket no.: 13-1352
- Citations: 576 U.S. 237 (more) 135 S. Ct. 2173; 192 L. Ed. 2d 306

Case history
- Prior: Defendant convicted; reversed, No. 96207, 2011 WL 6780456 (Ohio Ct. App. Dec. 22, 2011); reversed, 999 N.E.2d 592 (Ohio 2013); rehearing denied, 999 N.E.2d 698 (Ohio 2013); cert. granted, 573 U.S. 991 (2014).
- Subsequent: None

Holding
- The use at trial of out of court statements made by a child did not violate the Confrontation Clause, when the child did not testify, because the statements were not made with the primary purpose of creating evidence.

Court membership
- Chief Justice John Roberts Associate Justices Antonin Scalia · Anthony Kennedy; Clarence Thomas · Ruth Bader Ginsburg; Stephen Breyer · Samuel Alito; Sonia Sotomayor · Elena Kagan

Case opinions
- Majority: Alito, joined by Roberts, Kennedy, Breyer, Sotomayor, Kagan
- Concurrence: Scalia, joined by Ginsburg
- Concurrence: Thomas

Laws applied
- U.S. Const. amend. VI

Ohio v. Clark, 576 U.S. 237 (2015), is United States Supreme Court case opinion that narrowed the standard set in Crawford v. Washington for determining whether hearsay statements in criminal cases are permitted under the Confrontation Clause of the Sixth Amendment. The United States Supreme Court unanimously reversed the Supreme Court of Ohio on June 18, 2015. The Court held that the out-of-court statements were admissible because the primary purpose was not to create evidence. Citing a prior related case, Michigan v. Bryant, the Court formulated this test as one asking "whether a statement was given with the 'primary purpose of creating an out-of-court substitute for trial testimony.'"

== See also ==
- List of United States Supreme Court cases
- List of United States Supreme Court cases, volume 576
- Lists of United States Supreme Court cases by volume
- List of United States Supreme Court cases by the Roberts Court
