= Equal Employment Opportunity Commission v. Abercrombie & Fitch Stores =

- Supreme Court of the United States

Argued February 25, 2015 Decided June 1, 2015
- Full case name: Equal Employment Opportunity Commission v. Abercrombie & Fitch Stores, Inc.
- Docket no.: 14-86
- Citations: 575 U.S. 768 (more) 135 S. Ct. 2028; 192 L. Ed. 2d 35

Case history
- Prior: 798 F. Supp. 2d 1272 (N.D. Okla. 2011); reversed, 731 F.3d 1106 (10th Cir. 2013); cert. granted, 135 S. Ct. 44 (2014).

Holding
- To prevail in a Title VII disparate-treatment claim, an applicant need show only that their need for an accommodation was a motivating factor in the employer's decision, not that the employer had knowledge of their need.

Court membership
- Chief Justice John Roberts Associate Justices Antonin Scalia · Anthony Kennedy; Clarence Thomas · Ruth Bader Ginsburg; Stephen Breyer · Samuel Alito; Sonia Sotomayor · Elena Kagan

Case opinions
- Majority: Scalia, joined by Roberts, Kennedy, Ginsburg, Breyer, Sotomayor, Kagan
- Concurrence: Alito (in judgment)
- Concur/dissent: Thomas

Laws applied
- Title VII of the Civil Rights Act of 1964

Equal Employment Opportunity Commission v. Abercrombie & Fitch Stores, 575 U.S. 768 (2015), was a United States Supreme Court case regarding a Muslim American woman, Samantha Elauf, who was refused a job at Abercrombie & Fitch in 2008 because she wore a headscarf, which conflicted with the company's dress code. The Supreme Court of the United States ruled 8–1 in Elauf's favor on June 1, 2015.

== Background ==
In 2008, Elauf, then 17 years old, applied for a job at an Abercrombie & Fitch store in Tulsa, Oklahoma. During her interview with the company, she was wearing a hijab (headscarf), but did not say why. The woman interviewing her, Heather Cooke, was initially impressed with Elauf, but also concerned about her headscarf. Cooke had told the manager of the store that she thought Elauf was wearing the scarf for religious reasons, but the manager responded that employees were not allowed to wear hats at work, and so declined to hire her.

In 2009, the Equal Employment Opportunity Commission sued Abercrombie & Fitch on Elauf's behalf. This led to a lawsuit in a federal district court that resulted in Elauf receiving $20,000 in damages. However, this decision was later reversed by the 10th U.S. Circuit Court of Appeals, which ruled in favor of Abercrombie & Fitch on the basis that Elauf did not provide the company with information about her need for an accommodation.

== Opinion of the Court ==
On June 1, 2015, the Supreme Court ruled 8–1 in favor of Elauf. In an opinion by Associate Justice Antonin Scalia, the Court held that Elauf did not have to explicitly request an accommodation to obtain protection from Title VII of the Civil Rights Act of 1964, which prohibits religious discrimination in hiring.

Justice Samuel Alito wrote an opinion concurring in the judgment, stating that evidence of Abercrombie's knowledge of Elauf's religious practice was sufficient grounds to rule against Abercrombie. Justice Clarence Thomas concurred in part and dissented in part. Thomas agreed with the majority's interpretation that Title VII protects against "intentional discrimination" against a particular religious group, but felt that Abercrombie did not really engage in that here because their dress code was a religion-neutral policy that affected all potential applicants. This ruling revived the lawsuit Elauf had filed against the company.
