= Michigan v. EPA =

Michigan v. Environmental Protection Agency
- Supreme Court of the United States

Argued March 25, 2015 Decided June 29, 2015
- Full case name: Michigan, et al., Petitioners v. Environmental Protection Agency, et al. (No. 14-46); Utility Air Regulatory Group, Petitioner v. Environmental Protection Agency, et al. (No. 14-47); National Mining Association, Petitioner v. Environmental Protection Agency, et al. (No. 14-49)
- Docket no.: 14-46
- Citations: 576 U.S. 743 (more) 135 S. Ct. 2699; 192 L. Ed. 2d 674
- Argument: Oral argument
- Opinion announcement: Opinion announcement

Holding
- The Environmental Protection Agency must consider costs when it makes a "finding" that it is "necessary and appropriate" to issue a regulation (in this case, for power plants under the Clean Air Act).

Court membership
- Chief Justice John Roberts Associate Justices Antonin Scalia · Anthony Kennedy; Clarence Thomas · Ruth Bader Ginsburg; Stephen Breyer · Samuel Alito; Sonia Sotomayor · Elena Kagan

Case opinions
- Majority: Scalia, joined by Roberts, Kennedy, Thomas, Alito
- Concurrence: Thomas
- Dissent: Kagan, joined by Ginsburg, Breyer, Sotomayor

Laws applied
- Clean Air Act

Michigan v. Environmental Protection Agency, 576 U.S. 743 (2015), is a landmark United States Supreme Court case in which the Court analyzed whether the Environmental Protection Agency must consider costs when deciding to regulate, rather than later in the process of issuing the regulation.

Writing for a 5–4 majority, Justice Antonin Scalia held that the EPA must consider costs and that it interpreted the Clean Air Act unreasonably when it determined that it did not need to consider costs when it issued a "finding" that it was "necessary and appropriate" to regulate. Critics of the Environmental Protection Agency praised the Court's decision, while other commentators criticized Justice Scalia's decision to ignore health impacts in his opinion.

== Background ==
=== National Emissions Standards for Hazardous Air Pollutants Program ===
In 1990, Congress amended the Clean Air Act to create new regulations for over 180 different kinds of "hazardous air pollutants" emitted from stationary sources.

One of the programs created by the 1990 amendments was the National Emissions Standards for Hazardous Air Pollutants Program, which regulated pollution from "major sources" of air pollution. (Note: Under the Clean Air Act, a "major source" is defined as any source that "emits more than 10 tons of a single pollutant or more than 25 tons of a combination of pollutants per year") At the same time, Congress developed a procedure to determine the applicability of the Hazardous Air Pollutants Program to power plants that generated electricity from fossil fuels.

These procedures directed the Environmental Protection Agency ("EPA") to study the effects of emissions of hazardous pollutants from these power plants on public health, and to regulate power plants if "regulation is appropriate and necessary after considering the results of the study."

When regulating sources, the Clean Air Act states that the EPA must enforce minimum emissions regulations (known as "floor standards") and to consider costs, among other factors, when implementing more stringent emissions standards (known as "beyond-the-floor standards"). (Note: According to the Clean Air Act, the EPA "calibrates the floor standards to reflect the emissions limitations already achieved by the best-performing 12% of sources within the category or subcategory.") The EPA later interpreted the Clean Air Act to mean that "power plants become subject to regulation on the same terms as ordinary major and area sources"

=== EPA action and subsequent suit ===
The EPA completed the required study in 1998 and concluded that regulation of coal and oil-fired power plants was "appropriate and necessary."

In 2012, the Agency reaffirmed the "appropriate and necessary" finding and promulgated floor standards, finding that "mercury and other hazardous air pollutants posed risks to human health and the environment." Although the EPA estimated that regulations would cost power plants $9.6 billion per year, the EPA concluded that "costs should not be considered" when determining whether power plants should be regulated. (Note: Although the EPA "could not fully quantify the benefits of reducing power plants’ emissions of hazardous air pollutants, the Agency "estimated that these benefits were worth $4 to $6 million per year" in related ancillary benefits worth "$37 to $90 billion per year")

A group of non-profit organizations, corporations, and 23 states filed suit to challenge the EPA's refusal to consider costs when regulating power plants, but the United States Circuit Court for District of Columbia upheld the Agency's decision to not consider costs. In 2014, the Supreme Court of the United States granted certiorari to resolve the question of whether the EPA must consider costs when regulating power plants under the Clean Air Act.

== Opinion of the Court ==
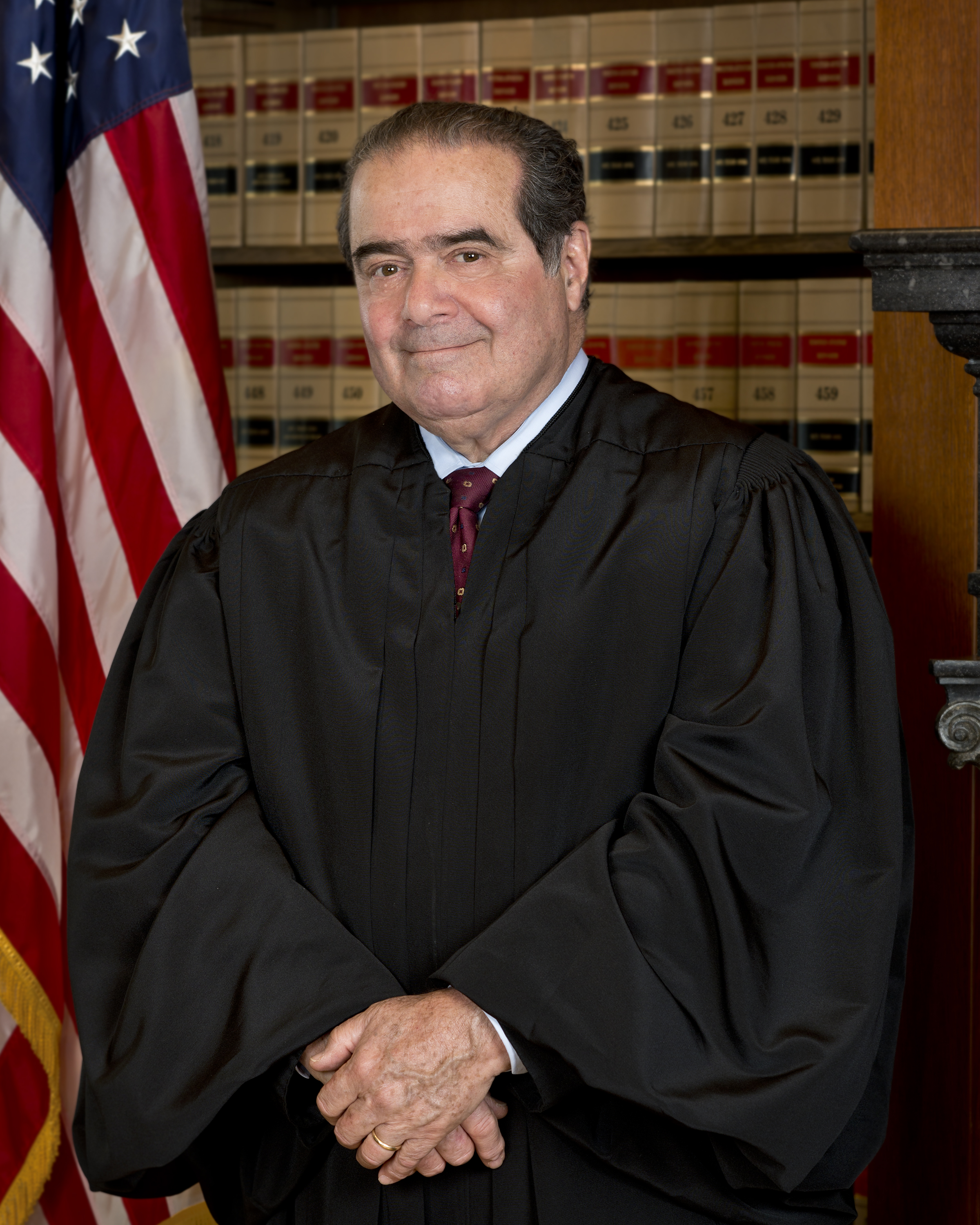
One commentator noted that Justice Antonin Scalia's majority opinion "exposes a divide on the Court not over environmental policy, but over the future of the administrative state."

Writing for a 5–4 majority, Justice Antonin Scalia held that the EPA interpreted the Clean Air Act unreasonably when it decided that it should not consider costs when regulating power plants. Justice Scalia analyzed the EPA's interpretation of the Clean Air Act under Chevron Deference, and concluded that the Agency "strayed far beyond [the] bounds" of "reasonable interpretation" when it determined that it could ignore costs. Looking at the language of the Clean Air Act, Justice Scalia concluded that when "[r]ead naturally in the present context, the phrase 'appropriate and necessary' requires at least some attention to cost." Additionally, Justice Scalia wrote that it is irrational and inappropriate "to impose billions of dollars in economic costs in return for a few dollars in health or environmental benefits." Consequently, Justice Scalia ruled that the EPA "must consider cost — including, most importantly, cost of compliance — before deciding whether regulation is appropriate and necessary."

=== Concurring and dissenting opinions ===
Justice Clarence Thomas wrote a separate concurring opinion urging the Court to re-evaluate the extent to which it defers to agency interpretations of statutes. He also wrote, "we should be alarmed that [the EPA] felt sufficiently emboldened by those precedents to make the bid for deference that it did here."

Justice Elena Kagan wrote a dissenting opinion in which she argued that the EPA did, in fact, consider costs and benefits when implementing regulations, which include "$80 billion" in quantifiable benefits and "as many as 11,000 fewer premature deaths annually, along with a far greater number of avoided illnesses." Additionally, Justice Kagan concluded that the EPA acted "well within its delegated authority" when it implemented regulations for power plants.

== Commentary and analysis ==
Commentators have observed that critics of the EPA "heralded" the Court's decision. However, some commentators have criticized Justice Scalia's decision to not consider health benefits in his opinion; one analyst wrote, "hundreds of thousands of people might have lived longer if regulations on mercury and other coal pollutants had not been tied up in court battles." Some commentators also suggested the Court's ruling may ultimately force other agencies to consider costs when promulgating and implementing regulations. Analysts also noted that the Courts decision "may well leave the Obama climate agenda in tatters."

=== Responses to the ruling ===
An EPA spokesperson said "the agency intended to move forward with the rule."

Patrick Parenteau, a specialist of environmental law at Vermont Law School, said that the Agency "has already done a detailed cost benefit analysis justifying the rule", and other scholars expressed doubt that the program would come to an end. However, other scholars suggested the EPA will likely revise their regulations in response to the Court's decision. Republican House Majority Leader Kevin McCarthy praised the Court's decision for "vindicat[ing] the House’s legislative actions to rein in bureaucratic overreach and institute some common sense in rule making."

Power plants have largely complied with the regulation while the United States Circuit Court for the District of Columbia considered the case on remand.

=== Impacts ===
Some commentators have suggested that Michigan v. EPA may foreshadow a retreat from the Court's prior administrative law jurisprudence, known as the Chevron deference, which generally gave deference to an agency's reasonable interpretation of an ambiguous statute. Additionally, one analyst identified Justice Clarence Thomas' concurring opinion as one of six opinions from the term in which he called for the Court to "systematically rethink administrative law on originalist grounds." Justice Thomas' doctrinal shift was described as the "beginning of Justice Thomas's originalist turn in administrative law", where he questions whether the Court's "delegation jurisprudence has strayed too far from our Founders' understanding of separation of powers." The court effectively rejected the Chevron deference in Loper Bright Enterprises v. Raimondo (2024), instead defaulting to the weaker Skidmore deference.

Michigan also influenced the Supreme Court's actions in West Virginia v. EPA, challenging the EPA's Clean Power Plan. Before a ruling was made by the federal circuit court, the Supreme Court intervened to stay enforcement of the EPA's rule. Memos obtained by The New York Times showed that Roberts had considered that in failing to stay the EPA mercury rule in Michigan, the rule came into force and required companies to spend funds to become compliant, and by the time the Supreme Court ruled in Michigan and overturned the rule, the costs were irreversible. As such, Roberts recommended to the other justices to stay the EPA's rule in West Virginia to prevent this same irreversible change from occurring. The New York Times considered this the first use of the shadow docket, as well as helping to form the basis of the major questions doctrine.

== See also ==
- List of United States Supreme Court cases, volume 576
- List of United States Supreme Court cases
