= Heien v. North Carolina =

- Supreme Court of the United States

Argued October 6, 2014 Decided December 15, 2014
- Full case name: Nicholas Brady Heien v. North Carolina
- Docket no.: 13-604
- Citations: 574 U.S. 54 (more) 135 S. Ct. 530; 190 L. Ed. 2d 475
- Argument: Oral argument
- Opinion announcement: Opinion announcement

Case history
- Prior: On writ on certiorari to the North Carolina Supreme Court; State of North Carolina v. Nicholas Brady Heien, 749 S.E.2d 278

Holding
- A police officer who stops a car based on a reasonable though mistaken understanding of the law does not violate the Fourth Amendment to the United States Constitution

Court membership
- Chief Justice John Roberts Associate Justices Antonin Scalia · Anthony Kennedy; Clarence Thomas · Ruth Bader Ginsburg; Stephen Breyer · Samuel Alito; Sonia Sotomayor · Elena Kagan

Case opinions
- Majority: Roberts, joined by Scalia, Kennedy, Thomas, Ginsburg, Breyer, Alito, Kagan
- Concurrence: Kagan, joined by Ginsburg
- Dissent: Sotomayor

Laws applied
- U.S. Const. amend. IV

Heien v. North Carolina, 574 U.S. 54 (2014), was a decision by the United States Supreme Court, ruling that a police officer's reasonable mistake of law can provide the individualized suspicion required by the Fourth Amendment to the United States Constitution to justify a traffic stop. The Court delivered its ruling on December 15, 2014.

== Background ==
On April 29, 2009, Maynor Javier Vasquez and Nicholas Heien were traveling along Interstate 77 in North Carolina. Vasquez was driving Heien's car, and Heien was sleeping in the back seat.

While watching for "criminal indicators of drivers [and] passengers", Sergeant Matt Darisse observed Vasquez drive by and thought he appeared "nervous". Sergeant Darisse then began following Vasquez. Vasquez eventually slowed his car when approaching a slower-moving vehicle, and Sergeant Darisse observed the car's right rear brake light had not turned on. Sergeant Darisse believed that it was a violation of North Carolina traffic law to drive a vehicle with a broken brake light, so he activated his blue lights and stopped Vasquez (observing that as he did so, the right brake light "flickered on"). Sergeant Darisse informed Vasquez and Heien that he had stopped them for a broken brake light.

During the stop, Sergeant Darisse began to suspect the vehicle might contain contraband. His suspicion increased when Vasquez and Heien claimed, in separate questioning, that they were traveling to different ultimate destinations. Sergeant Darisse then asked Vasquez if he could search the vehicle. Vasquez said he should ask Heien, who said he "d[id]n't really care". The ensuing search found cocaine.

=== In lower courts ===
Vasquez pleaded guilty to attempted cocaine trafficking. Heien filed a motion to suppress the results of the search to prevent their use in court, which the trial court denied. Heien then pleaded guilty to two counts of trafficking, while reserving his right to appeal the denial of his motion to suppress.

On appeal the North Carolina Court of Appeals reversed. After careful analysis of the North Carolina statute governing brake lights, the Court of Appeals concluded that it required only one working "stop lamp". Heien's left brake light was functional, so his right brake light's dysfunction did not constitute a violation. It also concluded that separate statutory language requiring all "originally equipped rear lamps [be] in good working order" did not apply to stop lamps. The Court of Appeals then concluded that the stop violated the Fourth Amendment, explaining that "an officer's mistaken belief that a defendant has committed a traffic violation is not an objectively reasonable justification for a traffic stop". The Court of Appeals then held that evidence from the search had to be suppressed under the exclusionary rule. (While federal courts and some state courts recognized a good-faith exception to the rule for officers acting in good faith, the North Carolina Supreme Court had previously explicitly declined to recognize it.)

North Carolina appealed the decision to the North Carolina Supreme Court, challenging only the conclusion that a mistaken belief that a traffic violation had occurred provided no "objectively reasonable justification" for a traffic stop. (North Carolina did not challenge the Court of Appeals's interpretation of the traffic statutes.) After surveying the answers to this question provided by other circuit and state courts, the North Carolina Supreme Court concluded that the Eighth Circuit's answer – that an officer may make a mistake of law and yet still act reasonably in making a stop based solely upon that mistake – was correct, declining to adopt eight other federal circuit courts' answer. It then concluded that Sergeant Darisse's mistake of law was objectively reasonable and that he had reasonable suspicion to stop Heien's vehicle.

Heien petitioned the Supreme Court for a writ of certiorari. On April 21, 2014, the Supreme Court agreed to hear the case.

== Supreme Court ==
The Court published its opinion on December 15, 2014, affirming the lower court by an 8–1 vote. Chief Justice Roberts authored the majority opinion, with Justice Kagan filing a concurring opinion in which Justice Ginsburg joined, and Justice Sotomayor filing a dissenting opinion. The majority held that a police officer's reasonable mistake of law can indeed provide the individualized suspicion required by the Fourth Amendment to justify a traffic stop based upon that understanding. In her concurring opinion, Kagan wrote that the full text of North Carolina's law "poses a quite difficult question of interpretation, and Sergeant Darisse's judgment, although overturned, had much to recommend it". In her dissent, Sotomayor argued that the reasonableness of a search or seizure should instead be determined by evaluating "an officer's understanding of the facts against the actual state of the law".

== See also ==
- List of United States Supreme Court cases
- List of United States Supreme Court cases, volume 574
