= Baker Botts L.L.P. v. ASARCO LLC =

- Supreme Court of the United States

Decided February 25, 2015
- Full case name: Baker Botts L.L.P. v. ASARCO LLC
- Citations: 576 U.S. 121 (more)

Holding
- Section 330(a)(1) of the Bankruptcy Code does not permit bankruptcy courts to award attorney's fees for work performed while defending fee applications.

Court membership
- Chief Justice John Roberts Associate Justices Antonin Scalia · Anthony Kennedy; Clarence Thomas · Ruth Bader Ginsburg; Stephen Breyer · Samuel Alito; Sonia Sotomayor · Elena Kagan

Case opinions
- Majority: Thomas, joined by Roberts, Scalia, Kennedy, Alito
- Concurrence: Sotomayor (in part)
- Dissent: Breyer, joined by Ginsberg, Kagan

Laws applied
- 11 U.S.C. §330(a)(1)

Baker Botts L.L.P. v. ASARCO LLC, 576 U.S. 121 (2015), was a United States Supreme Court case in which the Court held that Section 330(a)(1) of the Bankruptcy Code does not permit bankruptcy courts to award attorney's fees for work performed while defending fee applications.
