= Armstrong v. Exceptional Child Center, Inc. =

- Supreme Court of the United States

Decided March 31, 2015
- Full case name: Armstrong v. Exceptional Child Center, Inc.
- Citations: 575 U.S. 320 (more)

Holding
- The Supremacy Clause does not confer a private right of action.

Court membership
- Chief Justice John Roberts Associate Justices Antonin Scalia · Anthony Kennedy; Clarence Thomas · Ruth Bader Ginsburg; Stephen Breyer · Samuel Alito; Sonia Sotomayor · Elena Kagan

Case opinions
- Majority: Scalia (Parts I, II, III), joined by Roberts, Thomas, Breyer, Alito
- Plurality: Scalia (Part IV), joined by Roberts, Thomas, Alito
- Concurrence: Breyer (in part)
- Dissent: Sotomayor, joined by Kennedy, Ginsburg, Kagan

Armstrong v. Exceptional Child Center, Inc., 575 U.S. 320 (2015), was a United States Supreme Court case in which the court held that the Supremacy Clause does not confer a private right of action.

== Background ==
Providers of "habilitation services" under Idaho's Medicaid plan are reimbursed by the Idaho Department of Health and Welfare. Section 30(A) of the Medicaid Act requires Idaho's plan to "assure that payments are consistent with efficiency, economy, and quality of care" while "safeguard[ing] against unnecessary utilization of... care and services." Exceptional Child Center, the providers of habilitation services, sued a group of Idaho Health and Welfare Department officials including Armstrong, claiming that Idaho reimbursed them at rates lower than Section 30(A) permits, and seeking to enjoin petitioners to increase these rates. The federal district court entered summary judgment for the providers. The Ninth Circuit Court of Appeals affirmed, concluding that the Supremacy Clause gave the providers an implied right of action, and that they could sue under this implied right of action to seek an injunction requiring Idaho to comply with Section 30(a).

== Opinion of the court ==
The Supreme Court issued an opinion on March 31, 2015.
