= Yates v. United States (2015) =

- Supreme Court of the United States

Argued November 5, 2014 Decided February 25, 2015
- Full case name: John L. Yates, Petitioner v. United States
- Docket no.: 13-7451
- Citations: 574 U.S. 528 (more) 135 S. Ct. 1074; 191 L. Ed. 2d 64
- Argument: Oral argument
- Decision: Opinion

Case history
- Prior: United States v. Yates, 733 F.3d 1059 (11th Cir. 2013)

Holding
- For purposes of 18 U.S.C. § 1519, a "tangible object" is one used to preserve or record information and does not include, in this case, fish.

Court membership
- Chief Justice John Roberts Associate Justices Antonin Scalia · Anthony Kennedy; Clarence Thomas · Ruth Bader Ginsburg; Stephen Breyer · Samuel Alito; Sonia Sotomayor · Elena Kagan

Case opinions
- Plurality: Ginsburg, joined by Roberts, Breyer, Sotomayor
- Concurrence: Alito (in judgment)
- Dissent: Kagan, joined by Scalia, Kennedy, Thomas

Laws applied
- 18 U.S.C. § 1519; Sarbanes-Oxley Act of 2002

Yates v. United States, 574 U.S. 528 (2015), was a United States Supreme Court case in which the Court construed 18 U.S.C. § 1519, a provision added to the federal criminal code by the Sarbanes-Oxley Act, to criminalize the destruction or concealment of "any record, document, or tangible object" to obstruct a federal investigation. By a 5-to-4 vote, the Court stated that the term "tangible object" as used in this section means an object used to record or preserve information, and that this did not include fish.

== Background ==
Petitioner John L. Yates was a commercial fisherman operating out of Cortez, Florida. In 2007, a federal agent conducted an offshore inspection and found that the ship's catch had 72 undersized red grouper, in violation of United States federal conservation regulations. The federal agent instructed Yates to keep the undersized fish segregated in wooden crates to be measured ashore upon the vessel’s return. Four days later, the agent remeasured the fish and found that the undersized grouper had been replaced with larger ones. Upon questioning, a crew member admitted that Yates instructed his crew to throw the undersized fish overboard. Three years later, he was charged with violating 18 United States Code §1519.

This provision, originating from the Sarbanes-Oxley Act of 2002, states that a person may be fined or imprisoned for up to 20 years if the person "knowingly alters, destroys, mutilates, conceals, covers up, falsifies, or makes a false entry in any record, document, or tangible object with the intent to impede, obstruct, or influence" a federal investigation.

At trial, Yates sought an acquittal for the §1519 charge, arguing that fish were not tangible objects related to record-keeping. The District Court denied the acquittal motion, and Yates was found guilty by a jury of violating §1519 and sentenced to 30 days' imprisonment. The United States Court of Appeals for the Eleventh Circuit affirmed the conviction, holding that fish have a physical form and are therefore a tangible object under a dictionary definition.

Yates' attorney, now-federal judge John Badalamenti, petitioned for a writ of certiorari, which the Supreme Court granted.

== Opinion of the Court ==
Associate Justice Ruth Bader Ginsburg authored the plurality opinion, joined by Chief Justice John Roberts and Justices Stephen Breyer and Sonia Sotomayor, holding that "within §1519's compass," a tangible object is "one used to record or preserve information." Among other things, the plurality relied upon traditional canons of statutory construction including the canons noscitur a sociis ("a word is known by the company it keeps") and ejusdem generis ("general words following a list of specific words should usually be read in light of those specific words"), as well as the section's enactment as part of a statute dealing with financial fraud and its location within title 18.

Associate Justice Samuel Alito filed a separate opinion concurring in the judgment.

=== Dissent ===
Associate Justice Elena Kagan, joined by Justices Antonin Scalia, Anthony Kennedy, and Clarence Thomas, dissented. Justice Kagan concluded that a tangible object is "any object capable of being touched." Citing the United States Code and other U.S. laws, Kagan argued that tangible object "invariably covers physical objects of all kinds" and that the surrounding language of §1519 makes it clear that Congress "meant the term to have a wide range."

The dissenting opinion suggests that the plurality opinion acknowledges that a tangible object is "a discrete thing that possesses physical form." Kagan continues this line of argument by holding that a fish "is, of course, a discrete thing that possesses physical form," citing Dr. Seuss's book One Fish Two Fish Red Fish Blue Fish (1960) as general evidence. Kagan's view is that under the "ordinary meaning of the term," a tangible object in §1519 covers fish (including undersized red grouper).

== See also ==
- List of United States Supreme Court cases
- List of United States Supreme Court cases, volume 574
