= Oneok, Inc. v. Learjet, Inc. =

- Supreme Court of the United States

Decided April 21, 2015
- Full case name: Oneok, Inc. v. Learjet, Inc.
- Citations: 575 U.S. 373 (more)

Holding
- The Natural Gas Act does not preempt state-law antitrust claims against entities controlling natural-gas pipelines because the act does not occupy the field of controlling retail prices and curbing other unfair business practices.

Court membership
- Chief Justice John Roberts Associate Justices Antonin Scalia · Anthony Kennedy; Clarence Thomas · Ruth Bader Ginsburg; Stephen Breyer · Samuel Alito; Sonia Sotomayor · Elena Kagan

Case opinions
- Majority: Breyer
- Concurrence: Thomas (in part, in judgment)
- Dissent: Scalia, joined by Roberts

Laws applied
- Natural Gas Act

Oneok, Inc. v. Learjet, Inc., 575 U.S. 373 (2015), was a United States Supreme Court case in which the court held that the Natural Gas Act does not preempt state-law antitrust claims against entities controlling natural-gas pipelines because the act does not occupy the field of controlling retail prices and curbing other unfair business practices.

== Background ==
A group of manufacturers, hospitals, and other institutional buyers of natural gas directly from interstate pipelines—including Learjet—sued interstate pipelines—including Oneok. The lawsuit claimed that the pipelines had engaged in behavior that violated state antitrust laws. In particular, the buyers alleged that the pipelines reported false information to the natural-gas indices on which the buyers' natural-gas contracts were based. The indices affected not only retail natural-gas prices, but also wholesale natural-gas prices.

After removing the cases to federal court, the pipelines sought summary judgment on the ground that the Natural Gas Act preempted the state-law claims. That act gives the Federal Energy Regulatory Commission (FERC) the authority to determine whether rates charged by natural-gas companies or practices affecting such rates are unreasonable. However, it also limits FERC's jurisdiction to the transportation of natural gas in interstate commerce, the sale in interstate commerce of natural gas for resale, and natural-gas companies engaged in such transportation or sale. The act leaves regulation of other portions of the industry—such as retail sales—to the states.

The federal district court granted the pipelines' motion for summary judgment, reasoning that because the challenged business practices directly affected wholesale as well as retail prices, they were preempted by the act. The Ninth Circuit Court of Appeals reversed. While acknowledging that the pipelines' index manipulation increased wholesale prices as well as retail prices, it held that the state-law claims were not preempted because they were aimed at obtaining damages only for excessively high retail prices.

== Opinion of the court ==
The Supreme Court issued an opinion on April 21, 2015. The decision did not address conflict preemption.
