= Kingsley v. Hendrickson =

- Supreme Court of the United States

Argued April 27, 2015 Decided June 22, 2015
- Full case name: Michael B. Kingsley, Petitioner v. Stan Hendrickson, et al.
- Docket no.: 14-6368
- Citations: 576 U.S. 389 (more) 135 S. Ct. 2466; 192 L. Ed. 2d 416
- Related cases: Bell v. Wolfish
- Argument: Oral argument
- Opinion announcement: Opinion announcement

Case history
- Prior: Kingsley v. Josvai, 10-cv-832-bbc (W.D. Wis 2011); Kingsley v. Hendrickson, 744 F.3d 443 (7th Cir. 2014); cert. granted, 135 S. Ct. 1039 (2015).
- Subsequent: On remand, 801 F.3d 828 (7th Cir. 2015).

Holding
- A pretrial detainee's claim of the use of excessive force by a police officer must prove only that the force was objectively unreasonable, not necessarily prove that the officer thought the force was excessive.

Court membership
- Chief Justice John Roberts Associate Justices Antonin Scalia · Anthony Kennedy; Clarence Thomas · Ruth Bader Ginsburg; Stephen Breyer · Samuel Alito; Sonia Sotomayor · Elena Kagan

Case opinions
- Majority: Breyer, joined by Kennedy, Ginsburg, Sotomayor, Kagan
- Dissent: Scalia, joined by Roberts, Thomas
- Dissent: Alito

Laws applied
- U.S. Const. amend. XIV

Kingsley v. Hendrickson, 576 U.S. 389 (2015), is a United States Supreme Court case in which the Court held in a 5–4 decision that a pretrial detainee must prove only that force used by police is excessive according to an objective standard, not that a police officer was subjectively aware that the force used was unreasonable.

== Background ==
=== Trial and jury instruction ===
Michael Kingsley was being held in detention in a Monroe County jail in Sparta, Wisconsin in 2010, awaiting trial on drug charges. Kingsley was repeatedly ordered by officers to remove a piece of paper he had taped to the overhead light of his cell. So as to remove the paper, Kingsley was ordered to be temporarily moved to a receiving cell. Refusing to comply with officers' commands to stand against the door of his cell to be handcuffed, Kingsley was forcibly removed from the cell by four officers, one of whom was the defendant, Sergeant Stan Hendrickson, and moved to a receiving cell. All parties agreed that in the receiving cell, Sergeant Hendrickson placed his knee in Kingsley's back and Deputy Sheriff Fritz Degner eventually applied a Taser to his back.

However, the officers testified that Kingsley resisted their attempted removal of his handcuffs. Kingsley testified that he had not resisted their attempt and alleged that after being placed in the receiving cell, officers had slammed his head into a concrete bunk, which the officers denied. After being tasered, Kingsley was left handcuffed in the cell for around 15 minutes, when the officers removed his handcuffs.

Kingsley brought a civil action suit, Kingsley v. Josvai, against Hendrickson and Degner in the U.S. District Court for the Western District of Wisconsin, alleging a use of excessive force by the officers in violation of the Due Process Clause of the Fourteenth Amendment. Judge Barbara Brandriff Crabb denied the officers' motion for a summary judgment and the case moved to trial. Judge Crabb instructed the jury before deliberation that:

"In deciding whether one or more defendants used 'unreasonable' force against plaintiff, you must consider whether it was unreasonable from the perspective of a reasonable officer facing the same circumstances that defendants faced. You must make this decision based on what defendants knew at the time of the incident, not based on what you know now."

The jury found in favor of the officers.

=== Appeal of decision ===
Kingsley appealed to the U.S. Court of Appeals for the Seventh Circuit, arguing that the jury should have been instructed that a claim of the use of excessive force against a pretrial detainee should be judged not from the perspective of a reasonable officer, but from an objective standard. The Court of Appeals rejected Kingsley's argument, stating that the law required assessment of the officers' state of mind as by "subjective inquiry."

The United States Supreme Court granted certiorari in light of the lower court's decision that provoked of a circuit split.

== Judgment of the Court ==
In a 5–4 decision, the Supreme Court ruled that an objective standard must be used in judging whether an officer applied excessive force, reversing the Seventh Circuit Court of Appeals. Justice Breyer, joined by Justices Kennedy, Ginsburg, Sotomayor, and Kagan wrote for the majority, stating that a pretrial detainee is protected from "excessive force that amounts to punishment," even when, according to Bell v. Wolfish, the punishment is only "rationally related to a legitimate nonpunitive governmental purpose," rather than possessing an "express intent to punish." Therefore, in applying Bell, the plaintiff need not prove an intent to punish. As such, the instruction of the jury defining excessive force as "force applied recklessly" unacceptably requires proving a subjective state of mind of the officer. The Court rejected the respondents' arguments based on the Eighth Amendment's Cruel and Unusual Punishment Clause as applying only to convicted prisoners, not pretrial detainees. The Supreme Court reversed the decision of the Court of Appeals for the Seventh Circuit and remanded the case.

Justice Scalia was joined by Chief Justice Roberts and Justice Thomas in dissent. He wrote that harm inflicted on a pretrial detainee in this manner is not "imposed for the purpose of punishment" and so does not violate the Fourteenth Amendment.

Justice Alito dissented, stating that the case should have been dismissed as improvidently granted as there remains an unsettled question of whether a "pretrial detainee can bring a Fourth Amendment claim based on the use of excessive force by a detention facility employee."

== See also ==
- List of United States Supreme Court cases, volume 576
- Due Process Clause
