= Brumfield v. Cain =

- Supreme Court of the United States

Argued March 30, 2015 Decided June 18, 2015
- Full case name: Kevan Brumfield v. Burl Cain, Warden
- Docket no.: 13-1433
- Citations: 576 U.S. 305 (more) 135 S. Ct. 2269; 192 L. Ed. 2d 356; 2015 WL 2473376
- Argument: Oral argument
- Opinion announcement: Opinion announcement

Case history
- Prior: Writ of habeas corpus granted, 854 F. Supp. 2d 366 (M.D. La. 2012); reversed, 744 F.3d 918 (5th Cir. 2014); cert. granted, 135 S. Ct. 752 (2014).
- Subsequent: On remand, 808 F.3d 1041 (5th Cir. 2015); cert. denied, 136 S. Ct. 2411 (2016).

Holding
- Because Brumfield satisfied §2254(d)(2)’s requirements, he was entitled to have his Atkins claim considered on the merits in federal court.

Court membership
- Chief Justice John Roberts Associate Justices Antonin Scalia · Anthony Kennedy; Clarence Thomas · Ruth Bader Ginsburg; Stephen Breyer · Samuel Alito; Sonia Sotomayor · Elena Kagan

Case opinions
- Majority: Sotomayor, joined by Kennedy, Ginsburg, Breyer, Kagan
- Dissent: Thomas, joined by Roberts, Scalia, Alito (all but Part I–C)
- Dissent: Alito, joined by Roberts

Laws applied
- U.S. Const. amend. VIII; 28 U.S.C. § 2254(d)

Brumfield v. Cain, 576 U.S. 305 (2015), was a United States Supreme Court case in which the Court held that because Brumfield satisfied 28 U.S.C. § 2254(d)(2)’s requirements, he was entitled to have his Atkins v. Virginia claim considered on the merits in federal court.

== Background ==
Kevan Brumfield (born January 7, 1973) was sentenced to death for the January 7, 1993 murder of off-duty Baton Rouge police officer Betty Smothers. Brumfield and his accomplice, Henri Broadway (born September 7, 1970), shot and killed Officer Smothers while she was escorting the manager of a grocery store to the bank. Smothers was the mother of Warrick Dunn, who later became a running back for the Tampa Bay Buccaneers and the Atlanta Falcons.

Because Brumfield had been sentenced to death before Atkins v. Virginia, Louisiana courts had to determine how to implement the decision in cases involving earlier convictions. In a 2002 decision, the Louisiana Supreme Court set out the procedures for adjudicating claims of intellectual disability, drawing in part on the tenth edition of the American Association on Mental Retardation's Mental Retardation: Definition, Classification, and Systems of Supports and the fourth edition of the Diagnostic and Statistical Manual of Mental Disorders. The court did not make an evidentiary hearing automatic for defendants sentenced to death. Instead, defendants had to identify objective evidence raising the issue of intellectual disability.

Brumfield subsequently sought such a hearing, relying on evidence presented during the sentencing phase of his trial. The state trial court dismissed the petition without holding an evidentiary hearing or authorizing funds for further investigation.

== Opinion of the Court ==
Justice Sonia Sotomayor delivered the opinion of the Court. She stated that the state's denial of Brumfield's request was based on an "unreasonable determination of the facts" in regards to his mental ability. In addition, the state disregarded Brumfield's adaptive skills, or rather the adaptive impairments that prevented Brumfield from being able to process information. By a 5–4 vote, the opinion of the lower court was vacated and the cause was remanded.

Justice Clarence Thomas filed a dissent, arguing that since the majority still agreed with the factual record that supported the state court's decision, they cannot rule that the decision was "unreasonable" just because they would have reached a different conclusion. Thomas also added a picture of Smothers in her police uniform in the appendix of his dissent.

Justice Samuel Alito joined Justice Thomas' dissent in part, and then filed a second dissent to simply state that Thomas' inclusion of Warrick Dunn's life story as a contrast to Brumfield's, while inspiring, is not an essential part of the legal analysis.

== Subsequent developments ==
On July 20, 2016, Brumfield was resentenced to life in prison after he was ruled intellectually disabled and therefore ineligible for execution. Broadway remains on death row for his involvement in the murder, although it was Brumfield who actually fired the fatal shots which killed Smothers, Broadway had been the one to wound the grocery store manager. The getaway driver, West Paul, was sentenced to twenty-five years for his role in the murder. Paul was returned to jail in 2017 after he was booked on charges related to shoplifting. Prior to his return to jail he had only recently been released for his part in the murder of Smothers.

== See also ==
- Warrick Dunn
- List of United States Supreme Court cases, volume 576
- List of United States Supreme Court decisions on capital punishment
