= Holt v. Hobbs =

- Supreme Court of the United States

Argued October 7, 2014 Decided January 20, 2015
- Full case name: Gregory Houston Holt, A/K/A Abdul Maalik Muhammad, Petitioner v. Ray Hobbs, Director, Arkansas Department of Correction, et al., Respondents
- Docket no.: 13-6827
- Citations: 574 U.S. 352 (more) 135 S. Ct. 853; 190 L. Ed. 2d 747
- Argument: Oral argument

Case history
- Prior: 509 F. App'x 561 (8th Cir. 2012) (per curiam); cert. granted, 571 U. S. 1236 (2014).

Holding
- An Arkansas prison policy which prohibited a Muslim prisoner from growing a short beard in accordance with his religious beliefs violated the Religious Land Use and Institutionalized Persons Act.

Court membership
- Chief Justice John Roberts Associate Justices Antonin Scalia · Anthony Kennedy; Clarence Thomas · Ruth Bader Ginsburg; Stephen Breyer · Samuel Alito; Sonia Sotomayor · Elena Kagan

Case opinions
- Majority: Alito, joined by unanimous
- Concurrence: Ginsburg, joined by Sotomayor
- Concurrence: Sotomayor

Laws applied
- 42 U.S.C. § 2000cc et seq.

Holt v. Hobbs, 574 U.S. 352 (2015), was a United States Supreme Court case in which the Court unanimously ruled that an Arkansas prison policy which prohibited a Muslim prisoner from growing a short beard in accordance with his religious beliefs violated the Religious Land Use and Institutionalized Persons Act (RLUIPA).

== Background ==
Gregory Holt (also known as Abdul Maalik Muhammad) was a prisoner in the Arkansas Department of Corrections. Holt was also a Muslim who believed, based on hadith, that his faith obliged him to leave his beard entirely uncut. However, Arkansas policy prohibited inmates to grow any beards (except to a length of a quarter inch when medically required).

Holt requested an exemption from the no-beards policy through the prison grievance process. Based upon a case ordering California officials to allow Muslim prisoners to grow a half-inch beard, Holt requested permission to grow a half-inch beard only, as a "compromise". His request was rejected.

Holt then filed a motion in court to require Arkansas allow him to grow a half-inch beard, arguing that he deserved an exception under the RLUIPA. He argued pro se that he was entitled to an exemption because Arkansas's policy was not, as required under RLUIPA, the "least restrictive means" for Arkansas to further its interests.

The magistrate initially recommended the motion be denied, but the District Court temporarily granted his request and sent the matter back to the magistrate for a hearing. At the hearing, Holt testified that it was impossible to hide anything in his beard. Two prison officials testified in response that inmates could hide contraband in half-inch beards, that an escaped prisoner with a beard could change his appearance by shaving his beard, and that it would be difficult to consistently measure half-inch beards. The magistrate ultimately deferred to the judgment of the prison officials, relying on Eighth Circuit precedent, and recommended that Holt's motion be denied. The District Court adopted the magistrate's recommendations, and the Eighth Circuit affirmed.

Holt then filed a pro se petition for a writ of certiorari and a request to proceed in forma pauperis. On March 3, 2014, the Supreme Court agreed to hear the case.

== Supreme Court decision ==
The majority opinion written by Justice Alito said that RLUIPA does not require a prison to grant religious exemptions simply because a prisoner asks or because other prisons do. However, Arkansas officials offered no evidence that a short beard presented security risks or could serve as a hiding place for contraband, as the officials argued. Arkansas had not overcome the high hurdles set by the law in Burwell v. Hobby Lobby Stores, Inc: that policymakers may not burden a person's exercise of religion unless they can show a compelling governmental interest and that the policy was the least-restrictive means of achieving that goal.

In a concurrence, Justice Ginsburg, contrasting the case with Burwell v. Hobby Lobby, said accommodating Holt's request "would not detrimentally affect others who do not share petitioner's belief." In a separate concurrence, Justice Sotomayor disagreed with the majority's application of RLUIPA, but did agree that Arkansas officials did not adequately respond to Holt's request to keep a beard.

== See also ==
- List of United States Supreme Court cases
- List of United States Supreme Court cases, volume 574
