= B&B Hardware, Inc. v. Hargis Industries, Inc. =

- Supreme Court of the United States

Decided December 2, 2014
- Full case name: B&B Hardware, Inc. v. Hargis Industries, Inc.
- Citations: 575 U.S. 138 (more)

Holding
- Trademark Trial and Appeal Board adjudications of trademark infringement can preclude issues for district courts.

Court membership
- Chief Justice John Roberts Associate Justices Antonin Scalia · Anthony Kennedy; Clarence Thomas · Ruth Bader Ginsburg; Stephen Breyer · Samuel Alito; Sonia Sotomayor · Elena Kagan

Case opinions
- Majority: Alito
- Concurrence: Ginsburg
- Dissent: Thomas, joined by Scalia

B&B Hardware, Inc. v. Hargis Industries, Inc., 575 U.S. 138 (2014), was a United States Supreme Court case in which the court held that Trademark Trial and Appeal Board (TTAB) adjudications of trademark infringement can preclude issues for district courts.

== Background ==
The parties in the case were engaged in the business of manufacturing metal fasteners. In 1993, the petitioner, B&B registered a trademark for "SEALTIGHT" for its line of "self-sealing nuts, bolts, screws, rivets and washers" used in the aerospace industry. In 1996, Hargis filed to register a mark for "SEALTITE" for its sale and marketing of "self-piercing and self-drilling metal screws for use in the manufacture of metal and post-frame buildings." B&B opposed Hargis' filing on the grounds that the proposed mark would be confusingly similar to their own mark.

In 2002, the TTAB sided with B&B, finding that the SEALTITE mark was likely to cause confusion. Concurrently with the proceedings in the TTAB, B&B had sued Hargis in federal district court for trademark for infringement. They argued "that Hargis could not contest likelihood of confusion because of the preclusive effect of the TTAB decision." The district court did not agree, and thereafter a jury found that there was no likelihood of confusion and rendered a verdict in favor of Hargis.

B&B appealed to the United States Court of Appeals for the Eighth Circuit. The Eighth Circuit affirmed the decision of the lower court and B&B appealed to the Supreme Court.

== Opinion of the Court ==
In the majority opinion, Justice Alito rejected Hargis' argument that the Supreme Court should abandon the general rule that issue preclusion applies to proceedings before administrative agencies. There was no constitutional problem, Alito wrote, because "he Seventh Amendment does not strip competent tribunals of the power to issue judgments with preclusive effect." His opinion similarly dismissed the argument that there would be a violation of Article III.
