= Wellness International Network, Ltd. v. Sharif =

- Supreme Court of the United States

Decided May 26, 2015
- Full case name: Wellness International Network, Ltd. v. Sharif
- Citations: 575 U.S. 665 (more)

Holding
- Bankruptcy courts may adjudicate Stern claims with the parties' knowing and voluntary consent.

Court membership
- Chief Justice John Roberts Associate Justices Antonin Scalia · Anthony Kennedy; Clarence Thomas · Ruth Bader Ginsburg; Stephen Breyer · Samuel Alito; Sonia Sotomayor · Elena Kagan

Case opinions
- Majority: Sotomayor, joined by Kennedy, Ginsburg, Breyer, Kagan, Alito (in part)
- Concurrence: Alito (in part)
- Dissent: Roberts, joined by Scalia; Thomas (Part I only)
- Dissent: Thomas

Laws applied
- U.S. Const. art. III

Wellness International Network, Ltd. v. Sharif, 575 U.S. 665 (2015), was a United States Supreme Court case in which the court held that bankruptcy courts may adjudicate Stern claims with the parties' knowing and voluntary consent.

== Background ==
Richard Sharif tried to discharge a debt he owed to Wellness International Network, Ltd. and its owners (collectively Wellness) in his Chapter 7 bankruptcy. Wellness sought, among other things, a declaratory judgment from the Bankruptcy Court, contending that a trust that Sharif claimed to administer was in fact Sharif's alter-ego. Wellness asserted that its assets were his personal property and part of his bankruptcy estate. The Bankruptcy Court eventually entered a default judgment against Sharif.

While Sharif's appeal was pending in federal district court, but before briefing concluded, the Supreme Court held in Stern v. Marshall that Article III of the United States Constitution forbids bankruptcy courts to enter a final judgment on claims that seek only to "augment" the bankruptcy estate and would otherwise "exis[t] without regard to any bankruptcy proceeding." After briefing closed, Sharif sought permission to file a supplemental brief raising a Stern objection. The district court denied the motion, finding it untimely, and affirmed the Bankruptcy Court's judgment. Upon considering Sharif's appeal, the Seventh Circuit Court of Appeals determined that Sharif's Stern objection could not be waived because it implicated structural interests and reversed on the alter-ego claim, holding that the Bankruptcy Court lacked constitutional authority to enter final judgment on that claim.
