= T-Mobile South, LLC v. City of Roswell =

- Supreme Court of the United States

Decided January 14, 2015
- Full case name: T-Mobile South, LLC v. City of Roswell
- Citations: 574 U.S. 293 (more)

Holding
- The Telecommunications Act of 1996 requires a locality that denies an application to build cell phone tower to state its reasons for denial with sufficient clarity in a written record issued essentially contemporaneously with the denial.

Court membership
- Chief Justice John Roberts Associate Justices Antonin Scalia · Anthony Kennedy; Clarence Thomas · Ruth Bader Ginsburg; Stephen Breyer · Samuel Alito; Sonia Sotomayor · Elena Kagan

Case opinions
- Majority: Sotomayor
- Dissent: Roberts, joined by Ginsberg; Thomas (Part I only)
- Dissent: Thomas

Laws applied
- Telecommunications Act of 1996

T-Mobile South, LLC v. City of Roswell, 574 U.S. 293 (2015), was a United States Supreme Court case in which the court held that the Telecommunications Act of 1996 requires a locality that denies an application to build cell-phone tower to state its reasons for denial with sufficient clarity in a written record issued essentially contemporaneously with the denial.

== Background ==
Roswell, Georgia's city council (Council) held a public hearing to consider an application by T-Mobile South, LLC, to build a cell-phone tower on residential property. During the hearing, several Council members expressed concerns about the tower's impact on the area. The hearing ended with the Council unanimously passing a motion to deny the application. Two days later, the City's Planning and Zoning Division informed petitioner by letter that the application had been denied and that minutes from the hearing would be made available. The detailed minutes were published 26 days later.

T-Mobile filed suit, alleging that the Council's denial was not supported by substantial evidence in the record. The federal District Court agreed, concluding that the City, by failing to issue a written decision stating its reasons for denying the application, had violated the Telecommunications Act of 1996, which provides that a locality's denial "shall be in writing and supported by substantial evidence contained in a written record." The Eleventh Circuit Court of Appeals, following its precedent, found that the act's requirements were satisfied here because petitioner had received a denial letter and possessed a transcript of the hearing that it arranged to have recorded.

== Opinion of the court ==
The Supreme Court issued an opinion on January 14, 2015.
