= Perez v. Mortgage Bankers Ass'n =

Perez v. Mortgage Bankers Association
- Supreme Court of the United States

Argued December 1, 2014 Decided March 9, 2015
- Full case name: Thomas E. Perez, Secretary of Labor, et al. v. Mortgage Bankers Association, et al. Jerome Nickols, et al. v. Mortgage Bankers Association
- Docket nos.: 13-1041; 13-1052
- Citations: 575 U.S. 92 (more) 135 S. Ct. 1199; 191 L. Ed. 2d 186

Case history
- Prior: Mortg. Bankers Ass'n v. Harris, 720 F.3d 966, 405 U.S. App. D.C. 429 (D.C. Cir. 2013)

Holding
- Notice-and-comment procedures are not required when agencies enact interpretive rules, and they should not be required to make subsequent interpretations.

Court membership
- Chief Justice John Roberts Associate Justices Antonin Scalia · Anthony Kennedy; Clarence Thomas · Ruth Bader Ginsburg; Stephen Breyer · Samuel Alito; Sonia Sotomayor · Elena Kagan

Case opinions
- Majority: Sotomayor, joined by Roberts, Kennedy, Ginsburg, Breyer, Kagan; Alito (except Part III–B)
- Concurrence: Alito (in part)
- Concurrence: Scalia (in judgment)
- Concurrence: Thomas (in judgment)

Laws applied
- Administrative Procedure Act

Perez v. Mortgage Bankers Association, 575 U.S. 92 (2015), was a United States Supreme Court case in which the Court held that the D.C. Circuit's Paralyzed Veterans doctrine is contrary to a clear reading of the Administrative Procedure Act and "improperly imposes on agencies an obligation beyond the Act's maximum procedural requirements."

== Opinion of the Court ==
Associate Justice Sonia Sotomayor authored the opinion of the Court.

Associate Justices Samuel Alito, Antonin Scalia, and Clarence Thomas authored concurring opinions.

== See also ==
- List of United States Supreme Court cases
- List of United States Supreme Court cases, volume 575
