= Kansas v. Nebraska =

- Supreme Court of the United States

Decided February 24, 2015
- Full case name: Kansas v. Nebraska
- Citations: 574 U.S. 445 (more)

Holding
- When a state knowingly fails to comply with an interstate compact, the Supreme Court may order that state to disgorge its profits from the violation or pay damages. If there is no danger of the violation happening again, no injunctive relief is necessary.

Court membership
- Chief Justice John Roberts Associate Justices Antonin Scalia · Anthony Kennedy; Clarence Thomas · Ruth Bader Ginsburg; Stephen Breyer · Samuel Alito; Sonia Sotomayor · Elena Kagan

Case opinions
- Majority: Kagan
- Concur/dissent: Roberts
- Concur/dissent: Scalia
- Concur/dissent: Thomas, joined by Scalia, Alito; Roberts (Part III)

Kansas v. Nebraska, 574 U.S. 445 (2015), was a United States Supreme Court case in which the court held that, when a state knowingly fails to comply with an interstate compact, the Supreme Court may order that state to disgorge its profits from the violation or pay damages. If there is no danger of the violation happening again, no injunctive relief is necessary.

== Background ==
In 1943, Congress approved the Republican River Compact, an interstate compact between Kansas, Nebraska, and Colorado to apportion the "virgin water originating in" the Republican River Basin. In 1998, Kansas filed an original action in the United States Supreme Court contending that Nebraska's increased groundwater pumping was subject to regulation by the Compact to the extent that it depleted stream flow in the Basin. The court agreed. Ensuing negotiations resulted in the 2002 Final Settlement Stipulation (Settlement), which established mechanisms to accurately measure water and promote compliance with the Compact. The Settlement identified the Accounting Procedures, a technical appendix, as the tool by which the States would measure stream flow depletion, and thus consumption, due to groundwater pumping. The Settlement also reaffirmed that "imported water"—that is, water brought into the Basin by human activity—would not count toward a State's consumption. Again, the Accounting Procedures were to measure, so as to exclude, that water flow.

In 2007, following the first post-Settlement accounting period, Kansas petitioned this Court for monetary and injunctive relief, claiming that Nebraska had substantially exceeded its water allocation. Nebraska responded that the Accounting Procedures improperly charged the State for using imported water and requested that the Accounting Procedures be modified accordingly. The Court appointed a Special Master. His report concluded that Nebraska "knowingly failed" to comply with the Compact, recommended that Nebraska disgorge a portion of its gains in addition to paying damages for Kansas's loss, and recommended denying Kansas's request for an injunction. In addition, the report recommended reforming the Accounting Procedures. The parties filed exceptions.

== Opinion of the court ==
The Supreme Court issued an opinion on February 24, 2015.

Despite being the most frequent author of Supreme Court opinions citing the American Law Institute's Restatements of the Law between the 2013 to 2015 terms, Justice Scalia's partially concurring and dissenting opinion heavily criticized the Restatement (Third) of Restitution as not authoritative for this case. Seemingly ignoring his recommendation here against citing newer Restatement volumes because they supposedly strayed from an original mission to describe the law, Scalia subsequently cited the newer Restatement (Second) of the Foreign Relations Law of the United States.

== Subsequent developments ==
The case returned to a Special Master, and the Supreme Court entered another judgment in the case on March 9, 2015.
