= Williams-Yulee v. Florida Bar =

- Supreme Court of the United States

Argued January 20, 2015 Decided April 29, 2015
- Full case name: Lanell Williams-Yulee, Petitioner v. The Florida Bar
- Docket no.: 13-1499
- Citations: 575 U.S. 433 (more) 135 S. Ct. 1656; 191 L. Ed. 2d 570; 83 U.S.L.W. 4269; 25 Fla. L. Weekly Fed. S 213; 2015 WL 1913912; 2015 U.S. LEXIS 2983
- Argument: Oral argument
- Opinion announcement: Opinion announcement

Case history
- Prior: On writ of certiorari to the Supreme Court of Florida; Fla. Bar v. Williams-Yulee, 138 So. 3d 379 (Fla. 2014)

Holding
- The First Amendment does not prohibit States from barring judges and judicial candidates from personally soliciting funds for their election campaigns, provided the restriction on speech is narrowly tailored to serve a compelling interest. Supreme Court of Florida affirmed.

Court membership
- Chief Justice John Roberts Associate Justices Antonin Scalia · Anthony Kennedy; Clarence Thomas · Ruth Bader Ginsburg; Stephen Breyer · Samuel Alito; Sonia Sotomayor · Elena Kagan

Case opinions
- Majority: Roberts (except as to Part II), joined by Ginsburg, Breyer, Sotomayor, Kagan
- Plurality: Roberts (Part II), joined by Breyer, Sotomayor, Kagan
- Concurrence: Breyer
- Concurrence: Ginsburg (in part and in judgment), joined by Breyer (Part II)
- Dissent: Scalia, joined by Thomas
- Dissent: Kennedy
- Dissent: Alito

Laws applied
- U.S. Const. amend. I, Florida Code of Judicial Conduct Canon 7C(1)

Williams-Yulee v. Florida Bar, 575 U.S. 433 (2015), was a United States Supreme Court case in which the court held that the First Amendment did not prohibit states from barring judges and judicial candidates from personally soliciting funds for their election campaigns since that specific restriction on candidate's speech was deemed to be narrowly tailored to serve the compelling interest of keeping the judiciary impartial. It is an instance of a government regulation passing strict scrutiny.

At issue in the case was a Florida law which barred judges from personally soliciting campaign funds. However, judges could still set up a committee in order to raise campaign funds. Williams-Yulee was a judicial candidate in Hillsborough County, Florida, who sent out a soliciting letter for campaign contributions. She also posted the letter to her website. Williams-Yulee lost her campaign to the incumbent judge. The Florida Bar filed a complaint against her for violating the law shortly afterwards.

The effects of the ruling has been a point of discussion among academics. For instance, Josh Wheeler writing for SCOTUSBlog raised concerns about greater restrictions on judicial speech and the weakening of the strict scrutiny standard.
