= 2014 term opinions of the Supreme Court of the United States =

October 2014 to October 2015 opinions

The 2014 term of the Supreme Court of the United States began October 6, 2014, and concluded October 4, 2015. The table illustrates which opinion was filed by each justice in each case and which justices joined each opinion. This term was considered the most Liberal term since The Warren Court in the late 1960s

== Table key ==
Delivered the court's opinion

Joined the court's opinion

Filed a concurrence

Joined a concurrence

Filed a dissent

Joined a dissent

Filed a concurrence/dissent

Joined a concurrence/dissent

Did not participate in the decision
- Decisions that do not note an argument date were decided without oral argument. Decisions that do not note a justice delivering the court's opinion are per curiam.
- Multiple concurrences and dissents within a case are numbered, with joining votes numbered accordingly. Justices frequently join multiple opinions in a single case; each vote is subdivided accordingly.
- An asterisk ( * ) in the court's opinion denotes that it was only a majority in part or a plurality. An asterisk in a joining vote denotes that the justice joined it only in part.
- A dash ( - ) denotes that the justice voted without filing or joining an opinion.

== 2014 term opinions ==
#	Case name and citation	Argued	Decided	Roberts	Scalia	Kennedy	Thomas	Ginsburg	Breyer	Alito	Sotomayor	Kagan
1	Lopez v. Smith, 574 U.S. 1		October 6, 2014									
2	Johnson v. City of Shelby, 574 U.S. 10		November 10, 2014									
3	Carroll v. Carman, 574 U.S. 13		November 10, 2014									
4	Glebe v. Frost, 574 U.S. 21		November 17, 2014									
5	Integrity Staffing Solutions, Inc. v. Busk, 574 U.S. 27	October 8, 2014	December 9, 2014									
6	Warger v. Shauers, 574 U.S. 40	October 8, 2014	December 9, 2014									
7	Heien v. North Carolina, 574 U.S. 54	October 6, 2014	December 15, 2014									
8	Dart Cherokee Basin Operating Co. v. Owens, 574 U.S. 81	October 7, 2014	December 15, 2014		1	1	1* / 2					1
9	Jesinoski v. Countrywide Home Loans, Inc., 574 U.S. 259	November 4, 2014	January 13, 2015									
10	Whitfield v. United States, 574 U.S. 265	December 2, 2014	January 13, 2015									
11	Jennings v. Stephens, 574 U.S. 271	October 15, 2014	January 14, 2015									
12	T-Mobile South, LLC v. City of Roswell, 574 U.S. 293	November 10, 2014	January 14, 2015	1			1* / 2	1				
13	Teva Pharmaceuticals USA, Inc. v. Sandoz, Inc., 574 U.S. 318	October 15, 2014	January 20, 2015									
14	Holt v. Hobbs, 574 U.S. 352	October 7, 2014	January 20, 2015					1			1 / 2	
15	Christeson v. Roper, 574 U.S. 373		January 20, 2015									
16	Department of Homeland Security v. MacLean, 574 U.S. 383	November 4, 2014	January 21, 2015									
17	Gelboim v. Bank of America Corp., 574 U.S. 405	December 9, 2014	January 21, 2015									
18	Hana Financial, Inc. v. Hana Bank, 574 U.S. 418	December 3, 2014	January 21, 2015									
19	M&G Polymers USA, LLC v. Tackett, 574 U.S. 427	November 10, 2014	January 26, 2015									
20	Kansas v. Nebraska, 574 U.S. 445	October 14, 2014	February 24, 2015	* / 1 / 3*	2 / 3		3			3		
21	North Carolina Bd. of Dental Examiners v. FTC, 574 U.S. 494	October 14, 2014	February 25, 2015									
22	Yates v. United States, 574 U.S. 528	November 5, 2014	February 25, 2015					*				
23	Direct Marketing Assn. v. Brohl, 575 U.S. 1	December 8, 2014	March 3, 2015			1		2	2		2*	
24	Alabama Dept. of Revenue v. CSX Transp., Inc., 575 U.S. 21	December 9, 2014	March 4, 2015									
25	Dept. of Transportation v. Assoc. of American Railroads, 575 U.S. 43	December 8, 2014	March 9, 2015				1			2		
26	Perez v. Mortgage Bankers Assn., 575 U.S. 92	December 1, 2014	March 9, 2015		1		2			* / 3		
27	B&B Hardware, Inc. v. Hargis Industries, Inc., 575 U.S. 138	December 2, 2014	March 24, 2015									
28	Omnicare v. Laborers Dist. Council Const. Ind. Pension Fund, 575 U.S. 175	November 3, 2014	March 24, 2015		1		2					
29	Young v. United Parcel Service, Inc., 575 U.S. 206	December 3, 2014	March 25, 2015		1	1 / 2	1					
30	Alabama Legislative Black Caucus v. Alabama, 575 U.S. 254	November 12, 2014	March 25, 2015	1	1		1 / 2			1		
31	Grady v. North Carolina, 575 U.S. 306		March 30, 2015									
32	Woods v. Donald, 575 U.S. 312		March 30, 2015									
33	Armstrong v. Exceptional Child Center, Inc., 575 U.S. 320	January 20, 2015	March 31, 2015		*				*			
34	Rodriguez v. United States, 575 U.S. 348	January 21, 2015	April 21, 2015			1 / 2*	2			2 / 3		
35	Oneok, Inc. v. Learjet, Inc., 575 U.S. 373	January 12, 2015	April 21, 2015				*					
36	United States v. Kwai Fun Wong, 575 U.S. 402	December 10, 2014	April 22, 2015									
37	Williams-Yulee v. Florida Bar, 575 U.S. 433	January 20, 2015	April 29, 2015	*	1	2	1	* / 1	1* / 2	3		
38	Mach Mining, LLC v. EEOC, 575 U.S. 480	January 13, 2015	April 29, 2015									
39	Bullard v. Blue Hills Bank, 575 U.S. 496	April 1, 2015	May 4, 2015									
40	Harris v. Viegelahn, 575 U.S. 510	April 1, 2015	May 18, 2015									
41	Tibble v. Edison Int'l, 575 U.S. 523	February 24, 2015	May 18, 2015									
42	Coleman v. Tollefson, 575 U.S. 532	February 23, 2015	May 18, 2015									
43	Comptroller of Treasury of Md. v. Wynne, 575 U.S. 542	November 12, 2014	May 18, 2015		1 / 2* / 3		1* / 2	3				3
44	City and County of San Francisco v. Sheehan, 575 U.S. 600	March 23, 2015	May 18, 2015									
45	Henderson v. United States, 575 U.S. 622	February 24, 2015	May 18, 2015									
46	Commil USA, LLC v. Cisco Systems, Inc., 575 U.S. 632	March 31, 2015	May 26, 2015				*					
47	Kellogg Brown & Root Services, Inc. v. United States ex rel. Carter, 575 U.S. 650	January 13, 2015	May 26, 2015									
48	Wellness Int'l Network, Ltd. v. Sharif, 575 U.S. 665	January 14, 2015	May 26, 2015	1	1		1* / 2			*		
49	Elonis v. United States, 575 U.S. 723	December 1, 2014	June 1, 2015									
50	EEOC v. Abercrombie & Fitch Stores, Inc., 575 U.S. 768	February 25, 2015	June 1, 2015									
51	Bank of America, N. A. v. Caulkett, 575 U.S. 790	March 24, 2015	June 1, 2015			*			*		*	
52	Mellouli v. Lynch, 575 U.S. 798	January 14, 2015	June 1, 2015									
53	Taylor v. Barkes, 575 U.S. 822		June 1, 2015									
54	Zivotofsky v. Kerry, 576 U.S. 1	November 3, 2014	June 8, 2015	1 / 2	2					1 / 2		
55	Kerry v. Din, 576 U.S. 86	February 23, 2015	June 15, 2015		*							
56	Baker Botts L.L.P. v. ASARCO LLC, 576 U.S. 121	February 25, 2015	June 15, 2015								*	
57	Reyes Mata v. Lynch, 576 U.S. 143	April 29, 2015	June 15, 2015									
58	Reed v. Town of Gilbert, 576 U.S. 155	January 12, 2015	June 18, 2015			2		3	1 / 3	2	2	3
59	McFadden v. United States, 576 U.S. 186	April 21, 2015	June 18, 2015									
60	Walker v. Texas Div., Sons of Confederate Veterans, Inc., 576 U.S. 200	March 23, 2015	June 18, 2015									
61	Ohio v. Clark, 576 U.S. 237	March 2, 2015	June 18, 2015		1		2	1				
62	Davis v. Ayala, 576 U.S. 257	March 3, 2015	June 18, 2015			1	2					
63	Brumfield v. Cain, 576 U.S. 305	March 30, 2015	June 18, 2015	1* / 2	1*		1			1* / 2		
64	Horne v. Department of Agriculture, 576 U.S. 350	April 22, 2015	June 22, 2015					*	*			*
65	Kingsley v. Hendrickson, 576 U.S. 389	April 27, 2015	June 22, 2015	1	1		1			2		
66	Los Angeles v. Patel, 576 U.S. 409	March 3, 2015	June 22, 2015	1	1		1 / 2			2		
67	Kimble v. Marvel Entertainment, LLC, 576 U.S. 446	March 31, 2015	June 22, 2015									
68	King v. Burwell, 576 U.S. 473	March 4, 2015	June 25, 2015									
69	Texas Dept. of Housing and Community Affairs v. Inclusive Communities Project, Inc., 576 U.S. 519	January 21, 2015	June 25, 2015	2	2		1 / 2			2		
70	Johnson v. United States, 576 U.S. 591	April 20, 2015	June 26, 2015			1	2					
71	Obergefell v. Hodges, 576 U.S. 644	April 28, 2015	June 26, 2015	1	1 / 2 / 3 / 4		1 / 2 / 3 / 4			4		
72	Michigan v. EPA, 576 U.S. 743	March 25, 2015	June 29, 2015									
73	Arizona State Legislature v. Arizona Independent Redistricting Comm'n, 576 U.S. 787	March 2, 2015	June 29, 2015	1	1 / 2 / 3		1 / 2 / 3			1		
74	Glossip v. Gross, 576 U.S. 863	April 29, 2015	June 29, 2015		1 / 2		1 / 2	1 / 2	1 / 2		2	2
#	Case name and citation	Argued	Decided	Roberts	Scalia	Kennedy	Thomas	Ginsburg	Breyer	Alito	Sotomayor	Kagan

== 2014 term membership and statistics ==
This was the tenth term of Chief Justice Roberts's tenure and the fifth and last full term with the same membership.

Justice		Appointment history		Agreement with judgment		Opinions filed				
Seniority	Name	President	Date confirmed	%	#					Total
Chief Justice	John Roberts	George W. Bush	September 29, 2005	78.4%	58/74	7	1	1	5	14
Associate Justice	Antonin Scalia	Ronald Reagan	September 26, 1986	68.9%	51/74	9	4	2	13	28
Associate Justice	Anthony Kennedy	Ronald Reagan	February 18, 1988	87.8%	65/74	6	4	0	3	13
Associate Justice	Clarence Thomas	George H. W. Bush	October 23, 1991	59.5%	44/74	7	10	3	17	37
Associate Justice	Ruth Bader Ginsburg	Bill Clinton	August 10, 1993	86.5%	64/74	7	5	0	1	13
Associate Justice	Stephen Breyer	Bill Clinton	August 3, 1994	91.7%	66/72	8	4	1	3	16
Associate Justice	Samuel Alito	George W. Bush	January 31, 2006	70.3%	52/74	8	8	1	13	30
Associate Justice	Sonia Sotomayor	Barack Obama	August 6, 2009	89.2%	66/74	7	3	0	6	16
Associate Justice	Elena Kagan	Barack Obama	August 7, 2010	85.1%	63/74	7	2	0	2	11
Notes on statistics: Opinion counts only include the bench opinions listed above; opinions relating to orders or in-chambers opinions are not included.; Agreement with the Court's judgment does not guarantee agreement with the reasoning expressed in its opinion. A justice is not considered in agreement if they dissented even in part. Agreement percentages are based only on the listed cases in which a justice participated and are rounded to the nearest one-tenth of one percentage point.						Totals				
Notes on statistics: Opinion counts only include the bench opinions listed above; opinions relating to orders or in-chambers opinions are not included.; Agreement with the Court's judgment does not guarantee agreement with the reasoning expressed in its opinion. A justice is not considered in agreement if they dissented even in part. Agreement percentages are based only on the listed cases in which a justice participated and are rounded to the nearest one-tenth of one percentage point.						66	41	8	63	178
