= 2014 term United States Supreme Court opinions of Anthony Kennedy =

The 2014 term of the Supreme Court of the United States began October 6, 2014, and concluded October 4, 2015. This was the twenty-eighth term of Associate Justice Anthony Kennedy's tenure on the Court.
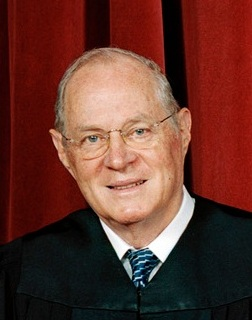

Anthony Kennedy 2014 term statistics

6	Majority or plurality	4	Concurrence	0	Other
3	Dissent	0	Concurrence/dissent	Total =	13
Bench opinions = 13		Opinions relating to orders = 0		In-chambers opinions = 0
Unanimous opinions: 0		Most joined by: Ginsburg, Sotomayor, Kagan (6)		Least joined by: Thomas (1 in part)

Type	Case	Citation	Issues	Joined by	Other opinions
	North Carolina Bd. of Dental Examiners v. FTC	574 U.S. ___ (2015)	Sherman Antitrust Act • state-action antitrust immunity	Roberts, Ginsburg, Breyer, Sotomayor, Kagan	Alito
	Direct Marketing Assn. v. Brohl	575 U.S. ___ (2015)	Tax Injunction Act • state collection of online sales tax • online retailer reporting requirements		Thomas; Ginsburg
	Department of Transportation v. Association of American Railroads	575 U.S. ___ (2015)	status of Amtrak as governmental entity	Roberts, Scalia, Ginsburg, Breyer, Alito, Sotomayor, Kagan	Thomas; Alito
	Young v. United Parcel Service, Inc.	575 U.S. ___ (2015)	Pregnancy Discrimination Act • disparate treatment claim		Breyer; Alito; Scalia
	Rodriguez v. United States	575 U.S. ___ (2015)	Fourth Amendment • traffic stop • dog sniff of car for drugs • reasonable suspicion		Ginsburg; Thomas; Alito
	Williams-Yulee v. Florida Bar	575 U.S. ___ (2015)	First Amendment • freedom of speech • ban on personal solicitation of campaign funds by judicial candidates		Roberts; Ginsburg; Breyer; Scalia; Alito
	Commil USA, LLC v. Cisco Systems, Inc.	575 U.S. ___ (2015)	patent law • induced infringement • belief in patent invalidity as defense	Ginsburg, Alito, Sotomayor, Kagan; Thomas (in part)	Scalia
	Zivotofsky v. Kerry	576 U.S. ___ (2015)	diplomatic recognition • separation of powers • Article Two • U.S. position on status of Jerusalem • Foreign Relations Authorization Act, Fiscal Year 2003 • passport designation of births in Jerusalem	Ginsburg, Breyer, Sotomayor, Kagan	Breyer; Thomas; Roberts; Scalia
	Kerry v. Din	576 U.S. ___ (2015)	Immigration and Nationality Act • exclusion of alien for terrorist activities • denial of spouse's visa • Due Process Clause	Alito	Scalia; Breyer
	Davis v. Ayala	576 U.S. ___ (2015)	solitary confinement		Alito; Thomas; Sotomayor
	Texas Dept. of Housing and Community Affairs v. Inclusive Communities Project, Inc.	576 U.S. ___ (2015)	Fair Housing Act • state allocation of federal low-income housing tax credits • disparate impact	Ginsburg, Breyer, Sotomayor, Kagan	Thomas; Alito
	Johnson v. United States	576 U.S. ___ (2015)	Armed Career Criminal Act • residual clause • Fifth Amendment • Due Process Clause • void for vagueness		Scalia; Thomas; Alito
	Obergefell v. Hodges	576 U.S. ___ (2015)	same-sex marriage • Fourteenth Amendment • Due Process Clause • Equal Protection Clause	Ginsburg, Breyer, Sotomayor, Kagan	Roberts; Scalia; Thomas; Alito
