= Kannon Shanmugam =

American attorney (born 1972)

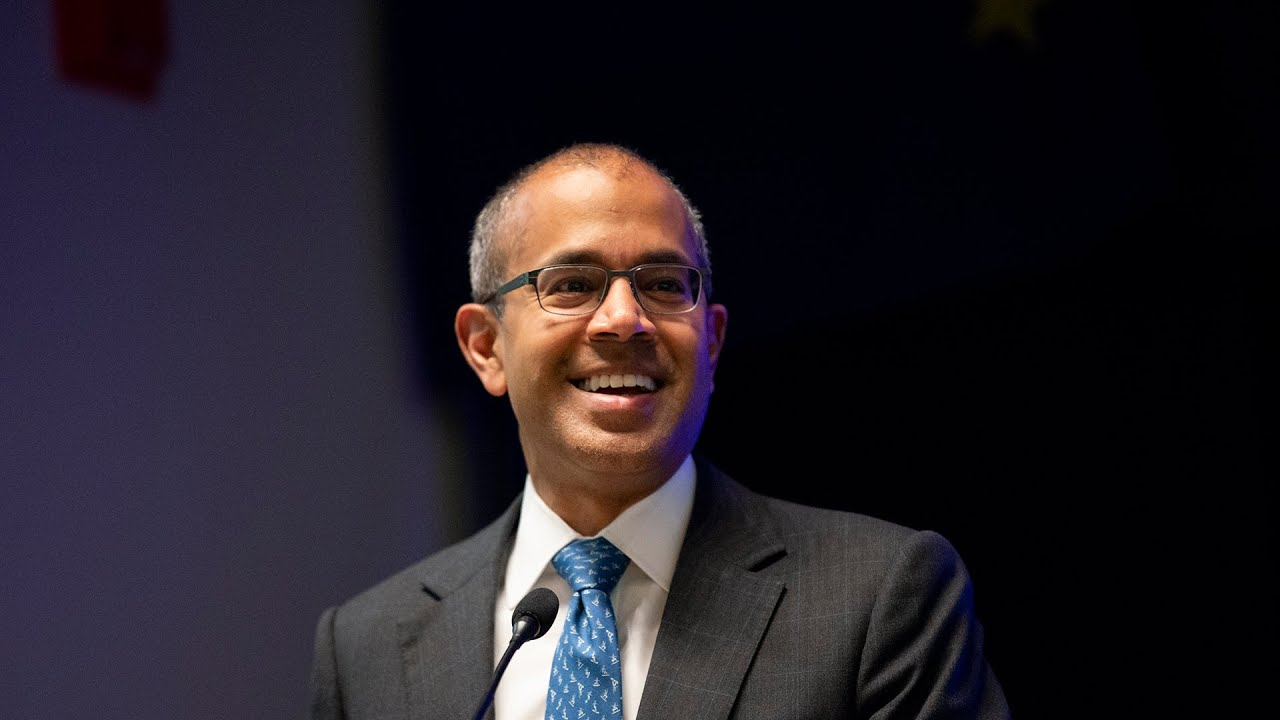
- Shanmugam at the Ninth Circuit Judicial Conference in 2022
- Born: Kannon Kumar Shanmugam; November 15, 1972 (age 53); Lawrence, Kansas, U.S.
- Education: Harvard University (BA, JD); Keble College, Oxford (MLitt)
- Political party: Republican
- Spouse: Victoria Shanmugam (m. 2003)

Kannon Kumar Shanmugam (born November 15, 1972) is an American lawyer known for his advocacy at the Supreme Court of the United States. As of October 2026, he has argued before the Supreme Court 41 times. Shanmugam is a partner at the law firm Davis Polk & Wardwell, where he is the head of the firm’s Supreme Court and appellate litigation practice.

Shanmugam joined Davis Polk in April 2026 after moving from Paul, Weiss, Rifkind, Wharton & Garrison, where he was co-chair of the firm's litigation department, chair of the firm's Washington, D.C. office, and chair of its Supreme Court and appellate practice group. He was previously a partner at Williams & Connolly. He also served as an Assistant to the Solicitor General of the United States. He began his legal career as an associate at the law firm of Kirkland & Ellis.

== Early life and education ==
Shanmugam was born on November 15, 1972, in Lawrence, Kansas. Both his parents had immigrated to the United States from India in the late 1960s. His father, Kumarasamy "Sam" Shanmugam, was a professor of electrical engineering at the University of Kansas for more than 30 years.

Shanmugam graduated from Lawrence High School as co-valedictorian in 1989 at age 16. He then went to Harvard University, where he was editor-in-chief of The Harvard Independent. He graduated in 1993 with a Bachelor of Arts, summa cum laude, in classics. He won a Marshall Scholarship and spent the next two years in England doing graduate study in classics at Keble College, Oxford, receiving a Master of Letters degree in 1995. Shanmugam then returned to the United States to attend Harvard Law School, where he was an executive editor of the Harvard Law Review and argued the case for the winning side in the Ames Moot Court Competition. He graduated in 1998 with a Juris Doctor, magna cum laude.

== Career ==
After law school, Shanmugam was a law clerk to judge J. Michael Luttig of the U.S. Court of Appeals for the Fourth Circuit from 1998 to 1999 and to Supreme Court justice Antonin Scalia from 1999 to 2000.

Shanmugam then entered private practice as an associate at the law firm of Kirkland & Ellis, where he worked with noted lawyer and judge Kenneth Starr. In 2004, Shanmugam became an assistant to the U.S. Solicitor General, where he worked for four years and argued eight cases before the Supreme Court. In 2008, he joined the law firm of Williams & Connolly, where he built the firm's Supreme Court and appellate practice. He was the only lawyer to have joined the firm as a lateral partner in 32 years. In 2019, Shanmugam moved to the law firm of Paul, Weiss, Rifkind, Wharton & Garrison to become the managing partner of the firm's Washington, D.C. office, and chair of its newly established Supreme Court and appellate practice.

Shanmugam has served as co-chair of the American Bar Association's Appellate Practice Committee and is also a past president of the Edward Coke Appellate Inn of Court. He is the only practicing American attorney who is an honorary bencher of the Inner Temple, one of the four English Inns of Court. He taught a course on Supreme Court advocacy as an adjunct professor of law at the Georgetown University Law Center, and served on the board of trustees of Thurgood Marshall Academy. He is a longtime member of the Federalist Society.

On May 29, 2025, Harvard University announced that Shanmugam had been elected to the Harvard Corporation.

== Supreme Court cases argued ==
Shanmugam has argued 41 cases before the Supreme Court. Most notably, in 2020, he argued on behalf of Seila Law in the landmark case Seila Law LLC v. Consumer Financial Protection Bureau, which held that the structure of the Consumer Financial Protection Bureau was unconstitutional. He is the lead counsel for the defendants in Suncor Energy (U.S.A.) Inc. v. County Commissioners of Boulder County, the currently pending Supreme Court case on whether state and local governments can sue fossil fuel companies under state law for damages from the effects of global climate change.

Cases Shanmugam has argued before the Supreme Court include:

- Suncor Energy (U.S.A.) Inc. v. County Commissioners of Boulder County (2026)
- Cisco Systems, Inc. v. Doe (2025)
- Facebook v. Amalgamated Bank (2024)
- Connelly v. United States (2023)
- Warner Chappell Music, Inc. v. Nealy (2023)
- Samia v. United States (2022)
- City of Austin, Texas v. Reagan National Advertising of Texas Inc. (2021)
- Cummings v. Premier Rehab Keller, P.L.L.C. (2021)
- Oklahoma v. Castro-Huerta (2021)
- Borden v. United States (2020)
- BP P.L.C. v. Mayor and City Council of Baltimore (2020)
- Goldman Sachs Group Inc. v. Arkansas Teacher Retirement System (2020)
- Henry Schein Inc. v. Archer and White Sales Inc. (2020)
- Seila Law LLC v. Consumer Financial Protection Bureau (2019)
- Helsinn Healthcare S.A. v. Teva Pharmaceuticals USA Inc. (2018)
- Henry Schein Inc. v. Archer and White Sales Inc. (2018)
- Obduskey v. McCarthy & Holthus LLP (2018)
- Republic of Sudan v. Harrison (2018)
- Dahda v. United States (2017)
- Digital Realty Trust, Inc. v. Somers (2017)
- WesternGeco LLC v. ION Geophysical Corp. (2017)
- Henson v. Santander Consumer USA, Inc. (2016)
- Midland Funding v. Johnson (2016)
- Dietz v. Bouldin (2015)
- Coleman v. Tollefson (2014)
- Omnicare, Inc. v. Laborers District Council Construction Industry Pension Fund (2014)
- Warger v. Shauers (2014)
- Clark v. Rameker (2013)
- Bailey v. United States (2012)
- Maryland v. King (2012)
- Smith v. Cain (2011)
- Merck & Co. v. Reynolds (2009)
- Hawaii v. Office of Hawaiian Affairs (2008)
- Ali v. Federal Bureau of Prisons (2007)
- Riley v. Kennedy (2007)
- United States v. Rodriquez (2007)
- Tellabs, Inc. v. Makor Issues & Rights, Ltd. (2006)
- Weyerhaeuser Co. v. Ross-Simmons Hardwood Lumber Co. (2006)
- Hill v. McDonough (2005)
- Oregon v. Guzek (2005)
- Muehler v. Mena (2004)

== Personal life ==
Shanmugam is married to Dr. Victoria Shanmugam, the director of the Office of Autoimmune Disease Research at the National Institutes of Health. They met in the quadrangle at Keble College, Oxford, when Shanmugam was studying there as a Marshall Scholar. They have three sons, Thomas, William, and Henry.

== See also ==
- List of law clerks for the ninth seat of the Supreme Court of the United States
