= List of United States Supreme Court cases, volume 575 =

This is a list of all the United States Supreme Court cases from volume 575 of the United States Reports:

Case name	Citation	Date decided
Direct Marketing Ass'n v. Brohl	575 U.S. 1	March 3, 2015
The Tax Injunction Act applies only to the assessment, levy, or collection of taxes, so it does not remove federal courts' jurisdiction to enjoin the enforcement of a tax law's notice and reporting requirements, which is a separate phase in the taxation process.
Ala. Dept. of Revenue v. CSX Transp., Inc.	575 U.S. 21	March 4, 2015
In determining sales tax discrimination, courts must view the state's tax scheme as a whole rather than just the challenged provision.
Dept. of Transp. v. Ass'n of Am. R.R.	575 U.S. 43	March 9, 2015
For purposes of determining the validity of the metrics and standards, Amtrak is a governmental entity.
Perez v. Mortgage Bankers Ass'n	575 U.S. 92	March 9, 2015
Notice-and-comment procedures are not required when agencies enact interpretive rules, and they should not be required to make subsequent interpretations.
Kansas v. Nebraska	575 U.S. 134	March 9, 2015
Follow-up actions on Kansas v. Nebraska, 574 U.S. 445 (2015).
B&B Hardware, Inc. v. Hargis Industries, Inc.	575 U.S. 138	March 24, 2015
Trademark Trial and Appeal Board adjudications of trademark infringement can preclude issues for district courts.
Omnicare, Inc. v. Laborers District Council Construction Industry Pension Fund	575 U.S. 175	March 24, 2015
Under the Securities Act of 1933, the issuer of a security is not liable for a statement of opinion simply because the stated opinion ultimately proves incorrect. On the other hand, the issuer is liable for the omissions of material facts from a stated opinion where those facts conflict with what a reasonable investor would take from the statement.
Young v. United Parcel Service, Inc.	575 U.S. 206	March 25, 2015
To bring a disparate treatment claim under the Pregnancy Discrimination Act, a pregnant employee must show that the employer refused to provide accommodations and that the employer later provided accommodations to other employees with similar restrictions.
Ala. Legislative Black Caucus v. Alabama	575 U.S. 254	March 25, 2015
The district court committed various legal errors, including the analysis of the racial gerrymandering claim as referring to the State "as a whole," rather than district-by-district.
Grady v. North Carolina	575 U.S. 306	March 30, 2015
North Carolina's nonconsensual satellite-based monitoring program, which it had ordered a recidivist sex offender to submit to for the rest of his life, constituted a search under the Fourth Amendment. The state's characterization of the monitoring program as civil was irrelevant, and that the program collected information was clear from the basic function of monitoring and the language of the authorizing statute. The lower court was directed to determine upon remand whether it constituted an unreasonable search.
Woods v. Donald	575 U.S. 312	March 30, 2015
Under United States v. Cronic, a defendant's Sixth Amendment rights are presumed to have been violated if they are denied counsel assistance during a critical stage of his trial. The lower court erred in granting federal habeas relief because Cronic and other established laws and cases by the Court have not yet specifically addressed the situation presented here: counsel is absent during testimony that only deals with the actions of the other co-defendants.
Armstrong v. Exceptional Child Center, Inc.	575 U.S. 320	March 31, 2015
The Supremacy Clause does not confer a private right of action.
Rodriguez v. United States	575 U.S. 348	April 21, 2015
Absent reasonable suspicion, officers may not extend the length of a traffic stop to conduct a dog sniff
Oneok, Inc. v. Learjet, Inc.	575 U.S. 373	April 21, 2015
The Natural Gas Act does not preempt state-law antitrust claims against entities controlling natural-gas pipelines because the act does not occupy the field of controlling retail prices and curbing other unfair business practices.
United States v. Kwai Fun Wong	575 U.S. 402	April 22, 2015
The statutes of limitations within the Federal Tort Claims Act are subject to equitable tolling because they have not been expressly tagged by Congress as jurisdictional.
Williams-Yulee v. Florida Bar	575 U.S. 433	April 29, 2015
The First Amendment does not prohibit States from barring judges and judicial candidates from personally soliciting funds for their election campaigns, provided the restriction on speech is narrowly tailored to serve a compelling interest. Supreme Court of Florida affirmed.
Mach Mining, LLC v. EEOC	575 U.S. 480	April 29, 2015
The EEOC can submit a sworn affidavit to show that it has completed the required conciliation process before suing for employment discrimination. An employer can challenge this affidavit with concrete evidence that the EEOC did not engage in conciliation in good faith, and a court can review that factual dispute.
Bullard v. Blue Hills Bank	575 U.S. 496	May 4, 2015
An order from a bankruptcy court denying a debtor's confirmation of a proposed repayment cannot be immediately appealed, as it is not a final order.
Harris v. Viegelahn	575 U.S. 498	May 18, 2015
A debtor who converts to Chapter 7 bankruptcy is entitled to return of any post-petition wages not yet distributed by the Chapter 13 trustee.
Tibble v. Edison International	575 U.S. 523	May 18, 2015
Because a fiduciary normally has a continuing duty to monitor investments and remove imprudent ones, a plaintiff may allege that a fiduciary breached a duty of prudence by failing to properly monitor investments and remove imprudent ones. Such a claim is timely as long it is filed within six years of the alleged breach of continuing duty.
Coleman v. Tollefson	575 U.S. 532	May 18, 2015
28 U.S.C. § 1915(g) prevents incarcerated people from proceeding in forma pauperis if three previous lawsuits have been dismissed on the grounds that it is frivolous, malicious, or fails to state a claim upon which relief may be granted, even if an appeal is pending for one of those suits.
Comptroller of the Treasury v. Wynne	575 U.S. 542	May 18, 2015
A state income-tax scheme that taxes residents for in-state and out-of-state income violates the Dormant Commerce Clause when it does not provide residents with full credit for the income taxes they pay to other states.
City of San Francisco v. Sheehan	575 U.S. 600	May 18, 2015
Police officers who entered the home of a mentally-ill woman and shot her were entitled to qualified immunity because there was no clearly established law requiring them to accommodate mental illness.
Henderson v. United States	575 U.S. 622	May 18, 2015
A court-ordered transfer of a felon’s lawfully owned firearms from Government custody to a third party is not barred by §922(g) if the court is satisfied that the recipient will not give the felon control over the firearms, so that he could either use them or direct their use.
Commil USA, LLC v. Cisco Systems, Inc.	575 U.S. 632	May 26, 2015
(1) A claim of induced infringement requires a showing that the defendant knew that it is engaging in infringing conduct. (2) A defendant's belief that a patent is invalid is not a defense to a claim of induced infringement.
Kellogg Brown & Root Services, Inc. v. United States ex rel. Carter	575 U.S. 650	May 26, 2015
The Wartime Suspension of Limitations Act only applies to criminal offenses.
Wellness Int'l Network, Ltd. v. Sharif	575 U.S. 665	May 26, 2015
Bankruptcy courts may adjudicate Stern claims with the parties' knowing and voluntary consent.
Elonis v. United States	575 U.S. 723	June 1, 2015
A court's instruction that requires only negligence with respect to the communication of a threat is not sufficient to support a conviction under 18 U.S.C. § 875(c). Third Circuit reversed and remanded.
EEOC v. Abercrombie & Fitch Stores, Inc.	575 U.S. 768	June 1, 2015
To prevail in a Title VII disparate-treatment claim, an applicant need show only that their need for an accommodation was a motivating factor in the employer's decision, not that the employer had knowledge of their need.
Bank of America, N. A. v. Caulkett	575 U.S. 790	June 1, 2015
Section 506(d) of the Bankruptcy Code does not allow a Chapter 7 debtor to void a junior mortgage on the debtor's property when the amount of the debt secured by the senior mortgage on that property exceeds the property's current market value.
Mellouli v. Lynch	575 U.S. 798	June 1, 2015
The court held that a drug conviction under state law triggers deportation only if the crime falls within a category of deportable offenses defined by federal law.
Taylor v. Barkes	575 U.S. 822	June 1, 2015
There is no Supreme Court precedent under the Eighth Amendment that clearly establishes the right to adequate suicide prevention protocols for the incarcerated. The lower court instead determined that there was such a right based on its own precedent from only a single case, which would not have put anyone on notice of any possible constitutional violation.
