= Suncor Energy (U.S.A.) Inc. v. County Commissioners of Boulder County =

- Supreme Court of the United States

Argued October 5, 2026
- Full case name: Suncor Energy (U.S.A.) Inc., et al., Petitioners v. County Commissioners of Boulder County, et al.
- Docket no.: 25-170

Questions presented
- 1. Whether federal law precludes state-law claims seeking relief for injuries allegedly caused by the effects of interstate and international greenhouse-gas emissions on the global climate.; 2. Whether this Court has statutory and Article III jurisdiction to hear this case.

Court membership
- Chief Justice John Roberts Associate Justices Clarence Thomas · Samuel Alito; Sonia Sotomayor · Elena Kagan; Neil Gorsuch · Brett Kavanaugh; Amy Coney Barrett · Ketanji Brown Jackson

Suncor Energy (U.S.A.) Inc. v. County Commissioners of Boulder County, No. 25-170, is a pending United States Supreme Court case. The court is to consider whether federal law displaces or precludes state-law climate tort claims arising from global greenhouse gas emissions.

== Background ==
Greenhouse gases, including carbon dioxide and methane, are widely understood by scientists to contribute to changes in the Earth’s climate by trapping heat in the atmosphere. Scientific and policy discussions have linked increased atmospheric concentrations of these gases to observed trends such as rising global temperatures, sea-level rise, and changes in weather patterns.

Beginning in the late 2010s, several state and local governments in the United States filed civil actions against fossil fuel companies seeking damages or equitable relief for alleged harms associated with climate change. These lawsuits have generally been brought under state tort law, including claims such as public nuisance, private nuisance, trespass, and failure to warn. Plaintiffs have alleged that the production and sale of fossil fuels contributed to greenhouse-gas emissions and resulting environmental and economic impacts.

Defendants have argued that such claims are governed by federal law due to the interstate and international nature of greenhouse-gas emissions, and that state-law causes of action are therefore precluded or displaced. They have also raised defenses based on federal preemption and the asserted involvement of foreign policy and national energy policy considerations.

== Lower court history ==
On April 17, 2018, the city of Boulder, Colorado and Boulder County, Colorado (wherein the city of Boulder is situated) brought suit in Colorado state district court against Suncor Energy and Exxon Mobil Corporation, fossil fuel corporations. Plaintiffs asserted state-law claims for public nuisance; private nuisance; trespass; unjust enrichment; violation of the Colorado Consumer Protection Act; and civil conspiracy. Each claim was premised on the theory that the corporations had sold fossil fuels, and knowing that doing so would harm Colorado.

Defendants successfully sought to remove the case to federal court. However, the federal district court later remanded the case back to Colorado state court. The United States Court of Appeals for the Tenth Circuit initially affirmed. Later, the Supreme Court vacated the Tenth Circuit's opinion for further consideration in light of a case that arose in a similar posture, BP p.l.c. v. Mayor and City Council of Baltimore (2021). The Tenth Circuit again affirmed the federal district court's remand of the case back to state court. On June 8, 2022, the defendant corporations filed a petition for a writ of certiorari seeking review of the lower courts' removal decisions. On April 24, 2023, the Supreme Court denied review.

Back in state court, defendants moved to dismiss the suit, arguing that plaintiffs' claims were preempted by federal law. On June 21, 2024, the Colorado district court denied this motion. Exxon Mobil, followed by Suncor, petitioned the Colorado Supreme Court for an interlocutory appeal. Following briefing and oral argument, the Colorado Supreme Court affirmed the lower court's preemption order in a 5–2 vote.

== Supreme Court ==
On August 8, 2025, Suncor and Exxon Mobil petitioned the Supreme Court for a writ of certiorari. On February 23, 2026, the Supreme Court granted review. Additionally, the Court posed a question to the parties of whether it had statutory or constitutional authority to hear the case. The case was argued on October 5, 2026, the first to be argued in the Supreme Court's October 2026 Term. The case was argued by Kannon K. Shanmugam for Petitioners and Kevin K. Russell for Respondents. Sarah M. Harris, Principal Deputy Solicitor General of the United States argued on behalf of the federal government, supporting Petitioners. All members of the Boulder County Board of Commissioners were in attendance, alongside the general counsels for Suncor and Exxon Mobil.

Justice Samuel Alito recused himself from the case. He had previously recused himself from cases involving oil and gas companies which has stock holdings. In a later interview, Alito stated he felt it was "prudent" to recuse himself from the case despite receiving legal advice from attorneys for the Supreme Court that recusal was not required.
