= Henderson v. United States =

Henderson v. United States may refer to the following legal cases:

- Henderson v. United States (1950), on racial discrimination in railcars
- Henderson v. United States (1967), on strip-searches at border crossings
- Henderson v. United States (1986)
- Henderson v. United States (2013)
- Henderson v. United States (2015), on a felon transferring a firearm
