= Lebron v. National Railroad Passenger Corp. =

Lebron v. National Railroad Passenger Corporation
- Supreme Court of the United States

Argued November 7, 1994 Decided February 21, 1995
- Full case name: Michael A. Lebron, Petitioner v. National Railroad Passenger Corporation
- Citations: 513 U.S. 374 (more) 115 S. Ct. 961; 130 L. Ed. 2d 902; 1995 U.S. LEXIS 909; 63 U.S.L.W. 4109; 95 Cal. Daily Op. Service 1228; 95 Daily Journal DAR 2219; 8 Fla. L. Weekly Fed. S 564

Case history
- Prior: On writ of cert. to the United States Court of Appeals for the Second Circuit

Holding
- Amtrak is a government actor for the purposes of the First Amendment and is subject to its provisions.

Court membership
- Chief Justice William Rehnquist Associate Justices John P. Stevens · Sandra Day O'Connor; Antonin Scalia · Anthony Kennedy; David Souter · Clarence Thomas; Ruth Bader Ginsburg · Stephen Breyer

Case opinions
- Majority: Scalia, joined by Rehnquist, Stevens, Kennedy, Souter, Thomas, Ginsburg, Breyer
- Dissent: O'Connor

Laws applied
- U.S. Const. Amend. I

Lebron v. National Railroad Passenger Corporation, 513 U.S. 374 (1995), is a United States Supreme Court case in which the Court held that Amtrak is a government agency and is thus subject to the First Amendment. The Court issued its decision in a 8–1 vote, with seven justices joining the majority opinion authored by Antonin Scalia. The lone dissent came from Justice Sandra Day O'Connor.

== Background ==
Michael A. Lebron, an artist known for creating political billboard displays, rented a large billboard in Amtrak's Penn Station. The advertisement was highly critical of the Coors Brewing Company for their support of the Contras in Nicaragua. The railroad turned down the ad because it was political, and they said they have a general policy against political advertisements, although the particular point of view was not an issue.

The District Court ruled that Amtrak, because of its close ties to the federal government, was a government actor for First Amendment purposes, and that its rejection of the display was unconstitutional. The Court of Appeals for the Second Circuit reversed, noting that Amtrak was, by the terms of the legislation that created it, not a government entity, and concluding that the government was not so involved with Amtrak that the latter's decisions could be considered federal action.

== Supreme Court ==
Justice Antonin Scalia delivered the opinion for the majority. Justice Sandra Day O'Connor dissented.

=== Decision ===
The Supreme Court first considers a complex line of jurisprudence concerning the circumstances under which the actions of a private entity may be attributed to the state for constitutional purposes, citing precedents such as Burton v. Wilmington Parking Authority. It notes the inconsistency in this area of law, as observed in Justice O'Connor's dissent in Edmonson v. Leesville Concrete Co.. The Court suggests, however, that it may not need to navigate these nuances in the present case because the petitioner, Lebron, advances a more straightforward contention: that Amtrak is not a private entity whose actions are occasionally deemed governmental, but is itself "Government itself."

Before assessing the merits of this argument, the Court addresses a procedural question: whether it is proper to consider Lebron's claim of Amtrak's governmental status at all, given that he did not raise it in the District Court or the Court of Appeals. In those forums, Lebron expressly disavowed this position. It was only after the Supreme Court granted certiorari that Lebron, in his merits brief, explicitly presented the alternative argument that Amtrak constituted a federal entity.

The Court resolves this procedural issue by the traditional rule articulated in cases like Yee v. City of Escondido: once a federal claim is properly presented, a party is not confined to the precise arguments made below but may advance any argument in support of that claim. The Court concludes that Lebron's contention about Amtrak's status is not a new claim—his consistent claim has been that Amtrak violated his First Amendment rights—but rather a new legal argument in support of that existing claim.

Amtrak was created by a special act of Congress specifically to achieve federal policy objectives under the direction and control of Presidential appointees. Based on its origins, structure, and purpose, the Court found that the public and private entities functioned together to the point where Amtrak was covered by the First Amendment.

Later, in Department of Transportation v. Association of American Railroads, the court held that Amtrak is a governmental entity for purposes of determining the validity of the metrics and standards.

=== Dissent ===
Justice Sandra Day O'Connor dissented, arguing that the Court should not have decided whether Amtrak was a government entity because Lebron had disclaimed that position in the lower courts. She also found no evidence that the federal government had influenced Amtrak's decision to reject the advertisement and would have affirmed the lower court's ruling.
