= Hana Financial, Inc. v. Hana Bank =

- Supreme Court of the United States

Decided January 21, 2015
- Full case name: Hana Financial, Inc. v. Hana Bank
- Citations: 574 U.S. 418 (more)

Holding
- Whether two trademarks may be tacked for purposes of determining priority is a question for the jury.

Court membership
- Chief Justice John Roberts Associate Justices Antonin Scalia · Anthony Kennedy; Clarence Thomas · Ruth Bader Ginsburg; Stephen Breyer · Samuel Alito; Sonia Sotomayor · Elena Kagan

Case opinion
- Majority: Sotomayor, joined by unanimous

Hana Financial, Inc. v. Hana Bank, 574 U.S. 418 (2015), was a United States Supreme Court case in which the court held that whether two trademarks may be tacked for purposes of determining priority is a question for the jury.

== Background ==
Hana Financial, Inc. and Hana Bank both provided financial services to individuals in the United States. When Hana Financial sued Hana Bank for trademark infringement, Hana Bank invoked in defense the tacking doctrine, under which courts have provided that a trademark user may make certain modifications to its mark over time while, in limited circumstances, retaining its priority position. Hana Financial's claim was tried before a jury, and the federal District Court adopted in substantial part the jury instruction on tacking proposed by Hana Financial. The jury returned a verdict in Hana Bank's favor. Affirming, the Ninth Circuit Court of Appeals explained that the tacking inquiry was an exceptionally limited and highly fact-sensitive matter reserved for juries, not judges.

== Opinion of the court ==
The Supreme Court issued an opinion on January 21, 2015.

== See also ==
- Teva Pharmaceuticals USA, Inc. v. Sandoz, Inc.
