= Gelboim v. Bank of America Corp. =

- Supreme Court of the United States

Decided January 21, 2015
- Full case name: Gelboim, et al. v. Bank of America Corporation, et al.
- Citations: 574 U.S. 405 (more)

Holding
- When multiple claims are consolidated into one proceeding, the dismissal of one of the claims is a final decision that may be appealed without waiting for final decisions on all claims.

Court membership
- Chief Justice John Roberts Associate Justices Antonin Scalia · Anthony Kennedy; Clarence Thomas · Ruth Bader Ginsburg; Stephen Breyer · Samuel Alito; Sonia Sotomayor · Elena Kagan

Case opinion
- Majority: Ginsburg, joined by unanimous

Gelboim v. Bank of America Corp., 574 U.S. 405 (2015), was a United States Supreme Court case in which the court held that when multiple claims are consolidated into one proceeding, the dismissal of one of the claims is a final decision that may be appealed without waiting for final decisions on all claims.

== Background ==
28 U. S. C. §1291 gives the United States courts of appeals jurisdiction over appeals from "all final decisions of the district courts of the United States," and its core application is to rulings that terminate an action. Federal Rule of Civil Procedure 54(b) permits district courts to authorize immediate appeal of dispositive rulings on separate claims in a civil action raising multiple claims. And 28 U. S. C. §1407 authorizes the Judicial Panel on Multidistrict Litigation (JPML) to transfer civil actions "involving one or more common questions of fact... to any district for coordinated or consolidated pretrial proceedings" in order to "promote the just and efficient conduct of such actions."

The London InterBank Offered Rate (LIBOR) is a reference point in determining interest rates for financial instruments in the United States and globally. The JPML established a multidistrict litigation (LIBOR MDL) for cases involving allegations that defendant-banks understated their borrowing costs, thereby depressing LIBOR and enabling the banks to pay lower interest rates on financial instruments sold to investors. Over 60 actions were consolidated for pretrial proceedings in the United States District Court for the Southern District of New York, including a class action filed by Ellen Gelboim and Linda Zacher, who raised the single claim that several banks, acting in concert, had violated federal antitrust law. Determining that no plaintiff could assert a cognizable antitrust injury, the District Court granted the banks' motion to dismiss all antitrust claims, including the Gelboim–Zacher complaint's sole claim. The District Court thus dismissed the Gelboim–Zacher complaint, denied leave to amend, and dismissed the case in its entirety.

Other cases made part of the LIBOR MDL, however, presented discrete claims which remained before the District Court. Assuming that the Gelboim–Zacher plaintiffs were entitled to an immediate appeal of right under §1291, the District Court granted Rule 54(b) certifications authorizing the plaintiffs in some of the multiple-claim actions to appeal the dismissal of their antitrust claims while their other claims remained pending in the District Court. On its own initiative, the Second Circuit dismissed the Gelboim–Zacher appeal because the order appealed from did not dispose of all of the claims in the consolidated action. The District Court thereafter withdrew its Rule 54(b) certifications.

== Opinion of the court ==
The Supreme Court issued an opinion on January 21, 2015.
