= City and County of San Francisco v. Sheehan =

- Supreme Court of the United States

Argued March 23, 2015 Decided May 18, 2015
- Full case name: City and County of San Francisco v. Sheehan
- Citations: 575 U.S. 600 (more)

Holding
- Police officers who entered the home of a mentally-ill woman and shot her were entitled to qualified immunity because there was no clearly established law requiring them to accommodate mental illness.

Court membership
- Chief Justice John Roberts Associate Justices Antonin Scalia · Anthony Kennedy; Clarence Thomas · Ruth Bader Ginsburg; Stephen Breyer · Samuel Alito; Sonia Sotomayor · Elena Kagan

Case opinions
- Majority: Alito, joined by Roberts, Kennedy, Thomas, Ginsburg, Sotomayor
- Concur/dissent: Scalia, joined by Kagan
- Breyer took no part in the consideration or decision of the case.

City and County of San Francisco v. Sheehan, 575 U.S. 600 (2015), was a United States Supreme Court case in which the court held that police officers who entered the home of a mentally-ill woman and shot her were entitled to qualified immunity because there was no clearly established law requiring them to accommodate mental illness.

Of two questions asked, the first was dismissed as improvidently granted.
