= Mach Mining, LLC v. EEOC =

Mach Mining, LLC v. Equal Employment Opportunity Commission
- Supreme Court of the United States

Decided April 29, 2015
- Full case name: Mach Mining, LLC v. Equal Employment Opportunity Commission
- Citations: 575 U.S. 480 (more)

Holding
- The EEOC can submit a sworn affidavit to show that it has completed the required conciliation process before suing for employment discrimination. An employer can challenge this affidavit with concrete evidence that the EEOC did not engage in conciliation in good faith, and a court can review that factual dispute.

Court membership
- Chief Justice John Roberts Associate Justices Antonin Scalia · Anthony Kennedy; Clarence Thomas · Ruth Bader Ginsburg; Stephen Breyer · Samuel Alito; Sonia Sotomayor · Elena Kagan

Case opinion
- Majority: Kagan, joined by unanimous

Mach Mining, LLC v. Equal Employment Opportunity Commission, 575 U.S. 480 (2015), was a United States Supreme Court case in which the court held that the Equal Employment Opportunity Commission can submit a sworn affidavit to show that it has completed the required conciliation process before suing for employment discrimination. An employer can challenge this affidavit with concrete evidence that the EEOC did not engage in conciliation in good faith, and a court can review that factual dispute.

== Background ==
Before suing an employer for employment discrimination under Title VII of the Civil Rights Act of 1964, the Equal Employment Opportunity Commission (EEOC or Commission) must first "endeavor to eliminate [the] alleged unlawful employment practice by informal methods of conference, conciliation, and persuasion." Once the Commission determines that conciliation has failed, it may file suit in federal court. However, "[n]othing said or done during" conciliation may be "used as evidence in a subsequent proceeding without written consent of the persons concerned."

After investigating a sex discrimination charge against Mach Mining, LLC, the EEOC determined that reasonable cause existed to believe that the company had engaged in unlawful hiring practices. The Commission sent a letter inviting Mach Mining and the complainant to participate in informal conciliation proceedings and notifying them that a representative would be contacting them to begin the process. About a year later, the Commission sent Mach Mining another letter stating that it had determined that conciliation efforts had been unsuccessful. The Commission then sued Mach Mining in federal court. In its answer, Mach Mining alleged that the Commission had not attempted to conciliate in good faith. The Commission countered that its conciliation efforts were not subject to judicial review and that, regardless, the two letters it sent to Mach Mining provided adequate proof that it had fulfilled its statutory duty.

The federal district court agreed that it could review the adequacy of the Commission's efforts, but granted the Commission leave to immediately appeal. The Seventh Circuit Court of Appeals reversed, holding that the Commission's statutory conciliation obligation was unreviewable.

== Opinion of the court ==
The Supreme Court issued an opinion on April 29, 2015.
