= 2014 term per curiam opinions of the Supreme Court of the United States =

The Supreme Court of the United States handed down eight per curiam opinions during its 2014 term, which began October 6, 2014 and concluded October 4, 2015.

Because per curiam decisions are issued from the Court as an institution, these opinions all lack the attribution of authorship or joining votes to specific justices. All justices on the Court at the time the decision was handed down are assumed to have participated and concurred unless otherwise noted.

== Court membership ==
Chief Justice: John Roberts

Associate Justices: Antonin Scalia, Anthony Kennedy, Clarence Thomas, Ruth Bader Ginsburg, Stephen Breyer, Samuel Alito, Sonia Sotomayor, Elena Kagan

== Lopez v. Smith ==
- Full caption: Raul Lopez, Warden v. Martin Vernis Smith
- Citations: 574 U.S. 1
- Prior history: Petition granted, C.D. Cal.; aff'd, 731 F. 3d 859 (9th Cir. 2013)
- Laws applied: U.S. const. amend. VI, XIV; 8 U.S.C. § 2254(d) (Antiterrorism and Effective Death Penalty Act of 1996)
- Full text of the opinion: official slip opinion · FindLaw

574 U.S. 1
Decided October 6, 2014.
Ninth Circuit reversed and remanded.

Under the Antiterrorism and Effective Death Penalty Act of 1996, if a state prisoner claims that a state court misapplied federal law, a federal court of appeals may only grant habeas relief if the state court's decision was "contrary to, or involved an unreasonable application of, clearly established Federal law, as determined by the Supreme Court", not as determined by that federal court's own precedent.

== Johnson v. City of Shelby ==
- Full caption: Tracey L. Johnson, et al. v. City of Shelby, Mississippi
- Citations: 574 U.S. 10
- Prior history: Summary judgment granted, No. 2:10-cv-00036, N.D. Miss., Mar. 28, 2012; aff'd, 743 F. 3d 59 (5th Cir. 2013)
- Laws applied: Fed. R. Civ. P. 8(a)(2); 42 U.S.C. § 1983
- Full text of the opinion: official slip opinion · Justia

574 U.S. 10
Decided November 10, 2014.
Fifth Circuit reversed and remanded.

The lower court erred when it granted summary judgment against the plaintiffs for their failure to invoke 42 U.S.C. §1983 in their complaint. A complaint must only contain "a short and plain statement of the claim showing that the pleader is entitled to relief," and cannot be dismissed for an "imperfect statement of the legal theory supporting the claim asserted." There is also no heightened pleading standard for claims brought under section 1983 that would require that statute to be expressly invoked.

== Carroll v. Carman ==
- Full caption: Jeremy Carroll v. Andrew Carman, et ux.
- Citations: 574 U.S. 13
- Prior history: Judgment for defendants, No. 3:10-cv-01013, M.D. Penn., Apr. 10, 2013; rev'd in part, 749 F. 3d 192 (3d Cir. 2014)
- Laws applied: U.S. Const. amend. IV; 42 U.S.C. § 1983
- Full text of the opinion: official slip opinion · Cornell

574 U.S. 13
Decided November 10, 2014.
Third Circuit reversed and remanded.

It is not clearly established constitutional law that a police officer must begin at a residence's front door to employ the "knock and talk" exception to the warrant requirement. The lower court therefore erred in ruling that the defendants were not entitled to qualified immunity, in a lawsuit alleging they unlawfully entered the plaintiffs' property in violation of the Fourth Amendment by going into their backyard and onto their deck without a warrant.

== Glebe v. Frost ==
- Full caption: Patrick Glebe, Superintendent, Stafford Creek Corrections Center v. Joshua James Frost
- Citations: 574 U.S. 21
- Prior history: Magistrate report and recommendation that petition be denied, Frost v. Van Boening, No. C09-725-TSZ-BAT, 2010 WL 5775657 (W.D. Wash. Oct. 5, 2010); report and recommendation adopted, No. C09-725-TSZ, 2011 WL 486198 (W.D. Wash. Feb. 4, 2011); aff'd, 692 F. 3d 924 (9th Cir. 2012); rev'd, en banc, 757 F. 3d 910 (9th Cir. 2014)
- Laws applied: U.S. Const. amends. VI, XIV, 8 U.S.C. § 2254(d) (Antiterrorism and Effective Death Penalty Act of 1996)
- Full text of the opinion: official slip opinion · FindLaw

574 U.S. 21
Decided November 17, 2014.
Ninth Circuit reversed and remanded.

Under the Antiterrorism and Effective Death Penalty Act of 1996, a Court of Appeals may only grant habeas corpus if a state's Supreme Court decision was "contrary to, or involved an unreasonable application of clearly established federal law as determined by the Supreme Court of the United States" or was "based on an unreasonable determination of the facts in light of the evidence presented in the State court proceeding". The Ninth Circuit instead erred in granting relief by misapplying Herring v. United States, which involved a complete denial of a summation instead of, as in this case, a limitation on it.

== Christeson v. Roper ==
- Full caption: Mark A. Christeson v. Don Roper, Warden
- Citations: 574 U.S. 373
- Prior history: Motion for substitution of counsel denied, No. 04–CV–08004 (W.D. Mo., Oct. 22, 2014); summarily affirmed, No. 14-3389 (8th Cir., Oct. 24, 2014); execution stayed, 574 U.S. 968 (2014)
- Laws applied: 28 U.S.C. § 2244 (Antiterrorism and Effective Death Penalty Act of 1996); 18 U.S.C. § 3599
- Full text of the opinion: official slip opinion · FindLaw

574 U.S. 373
Decided January 20, 2015.
Eighth Circuit reversed and remanded.

The lower courts erred in denying the petitioner's request for substitution of counsel, by not applying the "interests of justice" standards set forth in Martel v. Clair. The petitioner Mark Christeson was convicted by a jury in 1999 of three counts of capital murder and sentenced to death. The Supreme Court of Missouri then affirmed that ruling in 2004, which meant that he needed to submit any federal habeas petition by April 10, 2005. However, his court appointed attorneys did not meet with him until well after that deadline, and thus filed a petition that was later rejected for being untimely. Seven years later, the appointed counsel contacted two new attorneys to help handle Christeson's case. Knowing that filing a motion to reopen the case would have to be based on the original counsel's malfeasance for untimely filing the original habeas petition (thus resulting in a conflict of interest because the original counsel would have to submit their own misconduct), the new attorneys moved for substitution of counsel. The lower courts denied this request on grounds that the new counsel was from out of state and that the original attorneys had not abandoned their client. The Court however ruled that the substitution of counsel should have been permitted under Martel because of the original attorneys' apparent conflict of interest.

Alito filed a dissent, joined by Thomas, arguing that the one-year deadline for the habeas corpus petition may only be unenforceable under a few extraordinary situations, and the attorney error made in this case should not be one of them. Alito also wanted the Court to review the question of the petitioner's entitlement to the non-enforcement of the deadline, rather than only address the counsel substitution issue.

== Grady v. North Carolina ==
- Full caption: Torrey Dale Grady v. North Carolina
- Citations: 575 U.S. 306
- Prior history: Defendant ordered to submit to monitoring program, No. 06-CRS-52283, N.C. Sup. Ct., New Hanover Cty., May 14, 2013; aff'd, No. 13-958, 2014 N.C. App. LEXIS 467 (N.C. Ct. App. May 6, 2014); appeal dismissed, review denied, 762 S.E. 2d 460 (N.C. 2014)
- Laws applied: U.S. Const. amend. IV; N. C. Gen. Stat. Ann. § 14–208.40 (2013)
- Full text of the opinion: official slip opinion · FindLaw · Oyez

575 U.S. 306
Decided March 30, 2015.
Supreme Court of North Carolina vacated and remanded.

The Court ruled that North Carolina's nonconsensual satellite-based monitoring program, which it had ordered a recidivist sex offender to submit to for the rest of his life, constituted a search under the Fourth Amendment. The state's characterization of the monitoring program as civil was irrelevant, and that the program collected information was clear from the basic function of monitoring and the language of the authorizing statute. The lower court was directed to determine upon remand whether it constituted an unreasonable search.

== Woods v. Donald ==
- Full caption: Jeffrey Woods, Warden v. Cory Donald
- Citations: 575 U.S. 312
- Prior history: Petition granted, sub nom. Donald v. Rapelje, 2012 WL 6047130 (E.D. Mich., Dec. 5, 2012); aff'd, 580 Fed. Appx. 277 (6th Cir. 2014)
- Laws applied: U.S. Const. amend. VI
- Full text of the opinion: official slip opinion · Justia

575 U.S. 312
Decided March 30, 2015.
Sixth Circuit reversed and remanded.

Under United States v. Cronic, a defendant's Sixth Amendment rights are presumed to have been violated if he is denied counsel assistance during a critical stage of his trial. The lower court errored in granting federal habeas relief because Cronic and other established laws and cases by the Court have not yet specifically addressed the situation presented here: counsel is absent during testimony that only deals with the actions of the other co-defendants.

== Taylor v. Barkes ==
- Full caption: Stanley Taylor, et al. v. Karen Barkes, et al.
- Citations: 575 U.S. 822
- Prior history: Defendants' motion for summary judgment denied, sub nom. Barkes v. First Correctional Medical, Inc., 2012 WL 2914915 (D Del. July 17, 2012); aff'd, 766 F. 3d 307 (3d Cir. 2014)
- Laws applied: U.S. Const. amend. VIII; 42 U.S.C. § 1983
- Full text of the opinion: official slip opinion · Cornell

575 U.S. 822
Decided June 1, 2015.
Third Circuit reversed.

The Court held that there was no Supreme Court precedent under the Eighth Amendment that clearly establishes the right to adequate suicide prevention protocols for the incarcerated. The lower court instead determined that there was such a right based on its own precedent from only a single case, which would not have put anyone on notice of any possible constitutional violation.

== See also ==
- List of United States Supreme Court cases, volume 574
- List of United States Supreme Court cases, volume 575
