= Mellouli v. Lynch =

- Supreme Court of the United States

Argued January 14, 2015 Decided June 1, 2015
- Full case name: Moones Mellouli, Petitioner v. Loretta Lynch, Attorney General
- Docket no.: 13-1034
- Citations: 575 U.S. 798 (more)

Case history
- Prior: United States Court of Appeals for the Eighth Circuit

Holding
- The court held that a drug conviction under state law triggers deportation only if the crime falls within a category of deportable offenses defined by federal law.

Court membership
- Chief Justice John Roberts Associate Justices Antonin Scalia · Anthony Kennedy; Clarence Thomas · Ruth Bader Ginsburg; Stephen Breyer · Samuel Alito; Sonia Sotomayor · Elena Kagan

Case opinions
- Majority: Ginsburg, joined by Roberts, Scalia, Kennedy, Breyer, Sotomayor, Kagan
- Dissent: Thomas, joined by Alito

Laws applied
- Immigration and Nationality Act; Controlled Substances Act

Mellouli v. Lynch, 575 U.S. 798 (2015) is a Supreme Court of the United States ruling which reversed the United States Court of Appeals for the Eighth Circuit on the matter of whether Tunisian national Moones Mellouli should be deported after being convicted for driving under the influence.

== Background ==
Mellouli was detained after police "discovered four tablets of Adderall in his sock". He was originally charged with trafficking a controlled substance in a jail, however, he later pleaded guilty to the lesser charge of possessing drug paraphernalia in violation of Kansas state law.

The United States government attempted to deport Mellouli under the Immigration and Nationality Act, which contains a provision that aliens "relating to a controlled substance", are deportable.

== Case history ==
Both in immigration court and when in front of the Board of Immigration Appeals, Mellouli argued that as his conviction did not specify a controlled substance in the Controlled Substances Act, he cannot be deported. These judicial bodies rejected that argument, stating the specific substance is irrelevant to whether Mellouli can be deported.

The Eight Circuit appellate court ruled that the BIA judgement was "reasonable" given the language of the statute.

== Ruling ==
The case was originally brought against Attorney General Eric Holder; however, Loretta Lynch had taken over the Department of Justice at the time of the ruling, hence the case is cited as Mellouli v. Lynch. The Justice Department was represented by Rachel Kovner.

Justice Ruth Bader Ginsburg gave the majority opinion, arguing that as the conviction for possession of drug paraphernalia under Kansas state law did not require proof Mellouli that his offence 'related to' a federal controlled substance, he could not be deported.

Justice Thomas and Justice Alito dissented.
