= Bullard v. Blue Hills Bank =

- Supreme Court of the United States

Argued 1 April, 2015 Decided 4 May, 2015
- Full case name: Bullard v. Hyde Park Savings Bank
- Docket no.: 14-116
- Citations: 575 U.S. 496 (more) 135 S. Ct. 1686; 191 L. Ed. 2d 621

Case history
- Prior: In re Bullard, 475 B.R. 304 (Bankr. D. Mass. 2012); affirmed, 494 B.R. 92 (B.A.P. 1st Cir. 2013); appeal dismissed, 752 F.3d 483 (1st Cir. 2014); cert. granted, 135 S. Ct. 781 (2014).

Holding
- An order from a bankruptcy court denying a debtor's confirmation of a proposed repayment cannot be immediately appealed, as it is not a final order.

Court membership
- Chief Justice John Roberts Associate Justices Antonin Scalia · Anthony Kennedy; Clarence Thomas · Ruth Bader Ginsburg; Stephen Breyer · Samuel Alito; Sonia Sotomayor · Elena Kagan

Case opinion
- Majority: Roberts, joined by unanimous

Bullard v. Blue Hills Bank, 575 U.S. 496 (2015), was a United States Supreme Court case in which the court held that an order from a bankruptcy court denying a debtor's confirmation of a proposed repayment cannot be immediately appealed, as it is not a final order. The decision, in favor of Blue Hills Bank, was unanimous.
