= Tibble v. Edison International =

- Supreme Court of the United States

Argued February 24, 2015 Decided May 18, 2015
- Full case name: Glenn Tibble, et al, Petitioners v. Edison International, et al.
- Docket no.: 13–550
- Citations: 575 U.S. 523 (more) 135 S. Ct. 1823; 191 L. Ed. 2d 795

Holding
- Because a fiduciary normally has a continuing duty to monitor investments and remove imprudent ones, a plaintiff may allege that a fiduciary breached a duty of prudence by failing to properly monitor investments and remove imprudent ones. Such a claim is timely as long it is filed within six years of the alleged breach of continuing duty.

Court membership
- Chief Justice John Roberts Associate Justices Antonin Scalia · Anthony Kennedy; Clarence Thomas · Ruth Bader Ginsburg; Stephen Breyer · Samuel Alito; Sonia Sotomayor · Elena Kagan

Case opinion
- Majority: Breyer, joined by unanimous

Laws applied
- Employee Retirement Income Security Act

Tibble v. Edison International, 575 U.S. 523 (2015), was a United States Supreme Court case in which the Court held that "because a fiduciary normally has a continuing duty to monitor investments and remove imprudent ones, a plaintiff may allege that a fiduciary breached a duty of prudence by failing to properly monitor investments and remove imprudent ones. Such a claim is timely as long it is filed within six years of the alleged breach of continuing duty."

== Opinion of the Court ==
Associate Justice Stephen Breyer authored the unanimous opinion of the Court.
