= Bank of America, N.A. v. Caulkett =

- Supreme Court of the United States

Argued March 24, 2015 Decided June 1, 2015
- Full case name: Bank of America, N.A., Petitioner v. David B. Caulkett
- Docket no.: 13-1421
- Citations: 575 U.S. 790 (more) 135 S. Ct. 1995; 192 L. Ed. 2d 52
- Argument: Oral argument
- Opinion announcement: Opinion announcement

Case history
- Prior: Bank of Am., N.A. v. Caulkett, No. 6:14-cv-78-ORL-31, 2014 WL 7175386 (M.D. Fla. Feb. 14, 2014); affirmed sub nom., In re Caulkett, 566 F. App'x 879 (11th Cir. 2014); cert. granted, Bank of Am., N.A. v. Caulkett, 135 S. Ct. 674 (2014).; Bank of America, N.A. v. Toledo-Cardona, 556 F. App'x 911 (11th Cir. 2014); cert. granted, 135 S. Ct. 677 (2014)

Holding
- Section 506(d) of the Bankruptcy Code does not allow a Chapter 7 debtor to void a junior mortgage on the debtor's property when the amount of the debt secured by the senior mortgage on that property exceeds the property's current market value.

Court membership
- Chief Justice John Roberts Associate Justices Antonin Scalia · Anthony Kennedy; Clarence Thomas · Ruth Bader Ginsburg; Stephen Breyer · Samuel Alito; Sonia Sotomayor · Elena Kagan

Case opinion
- Majority: Thomas, joined by Roberts, Scalia, Ginsburg, Alito, Kagan; Kennedy, Breyer, Sotomayor (except footnote)

Laws applied
- 11 U.S.C. § 506

Bank of America, N.A. v. Caulkett, 575 U.S. 790 (2015), is a bankruptcy law case decided by the Supreme Court of the United States on June 1, 2015. In Caulkett, the Court held that 11 U.S.C. § 506(d) does not permit a Chapter 7 debtor to void a junior mortgage on the debtor's property (Note: Here, "the debtor's property" is a non-technical usage; to be technically precise, "the debtor's property" should be replaced with "the bankruptcy estate's property." See 11 U.S.C. § 541(a)(1). In this article, insofar as "the debtor's property" conveys the same meaning as "the bankruptcy estate's property," the former is used in the interest of general readability.) when the amount of the debt secured by the senior mortgage on that property exceeds the property's current market value.

== Background ==
=== Allowed secured claims in bankruptcy ===
==== Statutory provisions ====
Section 506(d) of the Bankruptcy Code provides, as a general rule, "[t]o the extent that a lien secures a claim against the debtor that is not an allowed secured claim, such lien is void." As used in the Bankruptcy Code, the term "claim" includes any "right to payment," and the term "lien" means a "charge against or interest in property to secure payment of a debt or performance of an obligation." A claim is "allowed" if proof of the claim is filed under 11 U.S.C. § 501, and the claim is not objected to by a party in interest.

As to what constitutes a "secured" claim, § 506(a) provides the following: Where a creditor's allowed claim is "secured by a lien on property in which the [bankruptcy] estate has an interest," that allowed claim "is a secured claim to the extent of the value of such creditor's interest in the estate's interest in such property ... and is an unsecured claim to the extent that the value of such creditor's interest ... is less than the amount of such allowed claim." In § 506(a), a creditor-lienor's "interest" in the estate's interest in certain collateral property means that creditor's lien on that property. As a functional matter, the value of a creditor-lienor's lien generally depends on four factors:

1. the "purpose of the valuation and ... the proposed disposition or use of [the collateral] property." (Note: Courts have developed several different valuation standards, e.g., "fair market value", or "going concern value." The purpose of a particular valuation will determine the particular valuation standard used.)
2. the value of the collateral property (and the estate's interest therein)
3. the amount of the creditor-lienor's allowed claim
4. the priority of the creditor-lienor's lien in relation to other interests in the collateral property. (Note: "Ordinarily, a prior lien gives a prior legal right that is entitled to prior satisfaction out of the subject it binds[.]" 51 Am. Jur. 2d Liens § 70 (2016).)

Section 506(a) thus distinguishes between "secured claims" and "unsecured" claims based on the numeric relation between (A) the value of a creditor-lienor's interest in the estate's interest in the collateral property; and (B) the amount of that creditor-lienor's allowed claim. In common bankruptcy parlance, this same numeric relation is used to denominate a creditor-lienor's allowed claim as "oversecured," "fully secured," or "undersecured." In a given case, the particular denomination used depends on the particular nature of that numeric relation.

===== Oversecured claim =====
A creditor-lienor's allowed claim is "oversecured" to the extent that the value of that creditor's interest in the estate's interest in the collateral property exceeds the amount of that creditor's allowed claim.

===== Fully secured claim =====
A creditor-lienor's allowed claim is "fully secured" where the value of that creditor's interest in the estate's interest in the collateral property equals the amount of that creditor's allowed claim.

===== Undersecured claim =====
A creditor-lienor's allowed claim is "undersecured" to the extent that the value of that creditor's interest in the estate's interest in the collateral property is less than the amount of that creditor's allowed claim, but greater than zero.

==== Dewsnup v. Timm ====
Dewsnup v. Timm, 502 U.S. 410 (1992), presented the Supreme Court with its first occasion to interpret 11 U.S.C. § 506(d). Specifically, Dewsnup presented the question whether § 506(d) allows a Chapter 7 debtor to avoid an undersecured creditor's lien on the debtor's realty to the extent that the amount of the claim secured by that lien exceeds the collateral realty's fair market value. In Dewsnup, the Chapter 7 debtor's $120,000 debt to a creditor was secured by lien on certain of the debtor's realty, the fair market value of which was $39,000. The debtor, invoking § 506(d), sought to void that lien to the extent that the creditor-lienor's $120,000 claim exceeded the collateral realty's $39,000 fair market value, thereby "stripping down" the creditor's lien to the value of the collateral realty.

The Dewsnup Court held that § 506(d) does not permit a Chapter 7 debtor to "strip down" an undersecured creditor's lien on the debtor's realty to the fair market value of the collateral realty. The Court concluded that the phrase "allowed secured claim" in § 506(d) meant an "allowed claim" of a creditor secured by a lien; that is, the phrase "allowed secured claim" did not have the same meaning in § 506(d) as in § 506(a)(1). (Note: The Dewsnup Court's interpretation of § 506(d) in this manner has provoked extensive, often scathing criticism. See, e.g., Dewsnup, 502 U.S. at 435 (Scalia, J., dissenting) (castigating the Dewsnup majority for "disregarding well-established and oft-repeated principles of statutory construction."); Lawrence Ponoroff & F. Stephen Knippenberg, The Immovable Object Versus the Irresistible Force: Rethinking the Relationship Between Secured Credit and Bankruptcy Policy, 95 Mich. L.Rev. 2234 (1997) ("The Immovable Object"); Barry E. Adler, Creditor Rights After Johnson and Dewsnup, 10 Bankr. Dev. J. 1, 10-12 (1993) ("Creditor Rights") (remarking that Court's decision in Dewsnup "torture[s] the English language"); Mary Josephine Newborn, Undersecured Creditors in Bankruptcy: Dewsnup, Nobelman, and the Decline of Priority, 25 Ariz. St. L.J. 547 (1993) ("Decline of Priority"); Howard, Dewsnupping, passim.) In so concluding, the Court acknowledged the apparent logical infirmity in its construction of § 506(d), but observed that it was not "writing on a clean slate." As support for that proposition, the Court cited "the pre-Code rule that liens pass through bankruptcy unaffected." (Note: Various commentators have questioned the soundness of the Court's statements with respect to "the pre-Code rule that liens pass through bankruptcy unaffected." Dewsnup, 502 U.S. at 417. See, e.g., Howard, Dewsnupping, at 526. Howard writes: The statement that "[a]part from reorganization proceedings ... no provision of the pre-Code statute permitted involuntary reduction of the amount of a creditor's lien for any reason other than payment on the debt" … reveals the Court's ignorance of the history of bankruptcy's treatment of liens. […] [I]t is also inaccurate to baldly assert that liens pass through bankruptcy unaffected. A more accurate statement is that liens pass through bankruptcy unaffected only if none of bankruptcy's powers to affect liens have been brought to bear. Id. Cf. Matter of Penrod, 50 F.3d 459, 463 (7th Cir. 1995) ("[Liens pass through bankruptcy unaffected]—unless they are brought into the bankruptcy proceeding and dealt with there.").) Because the Court found "ambiguity" in the text of § 506(d), the Court was "not convinced that Congress intended to depart from" that rule. (Note: Various commentators have challenged the soundness of the Dewsnup Court's "congressional intent" justification regarding its construction of § 506(d). See, e.g., Carlson, Bifurcation of Undersecured Claims, at 17-18 ("[T]he [Bankruptcy] Code indeed was intended to 'suffer a sea-change/Into something rich and strange.'" (quoting William Shakespeare, The Tempest, act 1, sc. 2, lines 401-02 (Riverside ed., Houghton Mifflin Co. 1974))); Newborn, Decline of Priority, at 581. Newborn writes: Essentially, the problems with the Dewsnup Court's analysis of history stems from the Court's failure to appreciate the Code's intended shift on the nature of security in bankruptcy. […] In drafting the Code, Congress made a choice to move bankruptcy toward a priority notion of security and away from an in rem notion. […] Secured creditors had a claim only on particular assets to the extent of the value of the property. Beyond this claim, secured creditors possessed only a right to be paid ahead of unsecured creditors. Id.) Thus, the Court's conclusion: the phrase "allowed secured claim" in § 506(d) means an "allowed claim" of a creditor secured by a lien.

The Court's decision in Dewsnup was poorly received and has been subject to extensive criticism "from its inception." For example, Justice Scalia's dissent in Dewsnup castigated the majority for "disregarding well-established and oft-repeated principles of statutory construction" and engaging in "'one-subsection-at-a-time' interpretation." And in Bank of America National Trust & Savings Ass'n v. 203 North LaSalle Street Partnership, 526 U.S. 434 (1999), Justice Thomas criticized Dewsnup for "enshroud[ing] both the Courts of Appeals ... and Bankruptcy Courts" in "methodological confusion." However, "[r]ight or wrong, the Dewsnuppian departure from the statute's plain language is the law."

=== Caulkett background ===
==== Facts ====
The debtor, David B. Caulkett, had two mortgage liens on his house in Melbourne, Florida; Bank of America held the junior mortgage lien. In 2013, Caulkett filed a bankruptcy petition under Chapter 7 in the U.S. Bankruptcy Court for the Middle District of Florida; at that time, the amount of the senior mortgage debt was greater than the fair market value of Caulkett's house.

==== Proceedings below ====
After filing in Chapter 7, Caulkett moved to void Bank of America's junior mortgage lien under § 506(d). The Bankruptcy Court granted Caulkett's motion, and Bank of America appealed. Both the District Court and the Eleventh Circuit affirmed the Bankruptcy Court's order. Thereafter, Bank of America filed a petition for a writ of certiorari in the Supreme Court, which the Court granted on November 17, 2014.

==== Question presented ====
Caulkett presented the question whether a Chapter 7 debtor may void a junior mortgage on the debtor's property under § 506(d) when the amount of the debt secured by the senior mortgage on that property exceeds the property's current value.

== Opinion of the Court ==
In Caulkett, the Court unanimously held that § 506(d) does not allow a Chapter 7 debtor to void a junior mortgage on the debtor's property when the amount of the debt secured by the senior mortgage on that property exceeds the property's current market value. The Court-based this holding on its prior decision in Dewsnup, reasoning as follows:

- Dewsnup held that the phrase "allowed secured claim" in § 506(d) means an "allowed claim" of a creditor secured by a lien on property.
- Bank of America's claim against Caulkett was "allowed" under § 502.
- Bank of America's allowed claim was secured by a lien on property; Bank of America held the junior mortgage on Caulkett's house.
- Thus, Bank of America's junior mortgage lien on Caulkett's house could not be voided under § 506(d).

Although the Court expressly acknowledged the logical infirmity in Dewsnup's reasoning, it declined to overrule Dewsnup; noting that Caulkett had not asked the Court to do so. Having declined to overrule Dewsnup, the Court concluded that Dewsnup dictated only one result: Section 506(d) does not allow a Chapter 7 debtor to void a junior mortgage on the debtor's property when the amount of the debt secured by the senior mortgage on that property exceeds the property's current market value.

== Commentary and analysis ==
Commentators on the Caulkett decision have at turns expressed bewilderment that the Caulkett Court declined to overrule Dewsnup and wariness as to heralding the long-term reign of Dewsnup and Caulkett. For example, one commentator has described it as "strange" that the Caulkett Court "went out of [its] way to criticize Dewsnup", yet declined to take the further step of overruling it. And another has remarked, more generally, that "Caulkett has kept spectators baffled as to why it did not overrule Dewsnup". At the same time, in light of the Caulkett Court's criticism of Dewsnup, other commentators have also questioned the long-term stability of Dewsnup's reign and thus—by extension—the future of Caulkett itself. Yet for the time being, Dewsnup and Caulkett are the law.

== Notes and references ==
All citations herein are written in Bluebook style.
