= List of United States Supreme Court cases, volume 574 =

This is a list of all the United States Supreme Court cases from volume 574 of the United States Reports:

Case name	Citation	Date decided
Lopez v. Smith	574 U.S. 1	October 6, 2014
Under the Antiterrorism and Effective Death Penalty Act of 1996, if a state prisoner claims that a state court misapplied federal law, a federal court of appeals may only grant habeas relief if the state court's decision was "contrary to, or involved an unreasonable application of, clearly established Federal law, as determined by the Supreme Court", not as determined by that federal court's own precedent.
Johnson v. City of Shelby	574 U.S. 10	November 10, 2014
The lower court erred when it granted summary judgment against the plaintiffs for their failure to invoke 42 U.S.C. §1983 in their complaint. A complaint must only contain "a short and plain statement of the claim showing that the pleader is entitled to relief," and cannot be dismissed for an "imperfect statement of the legal theory supporting the claim asserted." There is also no heightened pleading standard for claims brought under section 1983 that would require that statute to be expressly invoked.
Carroll v. Carman	574 U.S. 13	November 10, 2014
It is not clearly established constitutional law that a police officer must begin at a residence's front door to employ the "knock and talk" exception to the warrant requirement. The lower court therefore erred in ruling that the defendants were not entitled to qualified immunity, in a lawsuit alleging they unlawfully entered the plaintiffs' property in violation of the Fourth Amendment by going into their backyard and onto their deck without a warrant.
Glebe v. Frost	574 U.S. 21	November 17, 2014
Under the Antiterrorism and Effective Death Penalty Act of 1996, a Court of Appeals may only grant habeas corpus if a state's Supreme Court decision was "contrary to, or involved an unreasonable application of clearly established federal law as determined by the Supreme Court of the United States" or was "based on an unreasonable determination of the facts in light of the evidence presented in the State court proceeding". The Ninth Circuit instead erred in granting relief by misapplying Herring v. United States, which involved a complete denial of a summation instead of, as in this case, a limitation on it.
Integrity Staffing Solutions, Inc. v. Busk	574 U.S. 27	December 9, 2014
Activities that are not integral and indispensable to the principal activities of a job are not compensable under the Fair Labor Standards Act.
Warger v. Shauers	574 U.S. 40	December 9, 2014
Jurors may not testify about what occurred during jury deliberations, even to expose other jurors who were dishonest during voir dire.
Heien v. North Carolina	574 U.S. 54	December 15, 2014
A police officer who stops a car based on a reasonable though mistaken understanding of the law does not violate the Fourth Amendment to the United States Constitution
Dart Cherokee Basin Operating Co. v. Owens	574 U.S. 81	December 15, 2014
A defendant's notice of removal need not include evidence of the amount in controversy, unless the plaintiff or the court challenges the defendant's allegations.
United States v. California	574 U.S. 105	December 15, 2014
A supplemental decree in The Tidelands Case.
Jesinoski v. Countrywide Home Loans, Inc.	574 U.S. 259	January 13, 2015
The Truth in Lending Act does not require borrowers to file a lawsuit to effectuate rescission.
Whitfield v. United States	574 U.S. 265	January 13, 2015
The forced accompaniment statute described under 18 U.S.C. §2113(e) does not only apply to cases where the victim was forced to accompany the robber (or attempted robber) over a "substantial" distance.
Jennings v. Stephens	574 U.S. 271	January 14, 2015
In a federal habeas proceeding, a criminal defendant may argue a defense of the district court's judgment on alternative grounds without first taking a cross-appeal or obtaining a certificate of appealability unless doing so would enlarge the defendant's rights under the district court's judgment.
T-Mobile South, LLC v. City of Roswell	574 U.S. 293	January 14, 2015
The Telecommunications Act of 1996 requires a locality that denies an application to build cell phone tower to state its reasons for denial with sufficient clarity in a written record issued essentially contemporaneously with the denial.
Teva Pharmaceuticals USA, Inc. v. Sandoz, Inc.	574 U.S. 318	January 20, 2015
When reviewing a district court’s resolution of subsidiary factual matters made in the course of its construction of a patent claim, the Federal Circuit must apply a "clear error," not a de novo, standard of review.
Holt v. Hobbs	574 U.S. 352	January 20, 2015
An Arkansas prison policy which prohibited a Muslim prisoner from growing a short beard in accordance with his religious beliefs violated the Religious Land Use and Institutionalized Persons Act.
Christeson v. Roper	574 U.S. 373	January 20, 2015
The lower courts erred in denying the petitioner's request for substitution of counsel, by not applying the "interests of justice" standards set forth in Martel v. Clair. The Court however ruled that the substitution of counsel should have been permitted under Martel because of the original attorneys' apparent conflict of interest.
Dept. of Homeland Security v. MacLean	574 U.S. 383	January 21, 2015
A whistleblower disclosure that is specifically prohibited by a rule or regulation is permitted because the disclosure is not "specifically prohibited by law" within the meaning of the statute protecting whistleblowers.
Gelboim v. Bank of Am. Corp.	574 U.S. 405	January 21, 2015
When multiple claims are consolidated into one proceeding, the dismissal of one of the claims is a final decision that may be appealed without waiting for final decisions on all claims.
Hana Financial, Inc. v. Hana Bank	574 U.S. 418	January 21, 2015
Whether two trademarks may be "tacked" (that is, when a new mark takes on the priority position of an older mark) is a jury question.
M&G Polymers USA, LLC v. Tackett	574 U.S. 427	January 26, 2015
The interpretation of collective bargaining agreements must follow ordinary contract principles when that interpretation does not conflict with federal labor policy.
Kansas v. Nebraska	574 U.S. 445	February 24, 2015
When a state knowingly fails to comply with an interstate compact, the Supreme Court may order that state to disgorge its profits from the violation or pay damages. If there is no danger of the violation happening again, no injunctive relief is necessary.
N.C. State Board of Dental Examiners v. FTC	574 U.S. 494	February 25, 2015
If a controlling number of an agency's decisionmakers are active market participants in the occupation the agency regulates, the agency can invoke state-action antitrust immunity only if it was subject to active supervision by the State.
Yates v. United States	574 U.S. 528	February 25, 2015
For purposes of 18 U.S.C. § 1519, a "tangible object" is one used to preserve or record information and does not include, in this case, fish.
