= Comptroller of the Treasury of Maryland v. Wynne =

- Supreme Court of the United States

Argued November 12, 2014 Decided May 18, 2015
- Full case name: Comptroller of the Treasury of Maryland v. Brian Wynne et ux.
- Docket no.: 13-485
- Citations: 575 U.S. 542 (more) 135 S. Ct. 1787; 191 L. Ed. 2d 813

Case history
- Prior: 431 Md. 147, 64 A.3d 453 (2013); cert. granted, 572 U.S. 1134 (2014).

Holding
- A state income-tax scheme that taxes residents for in-state and out-of-state income violates the Dormant Commerce Clause when it does not provide residents with full credit for the income taxes they pay to other states.

Court membership
- Chief Justice John Roberts Associate Justices Antonin Scalia · Anthony Kennedy; Clarence Thomas · Ruth Bader Ginsburg; Stephen Breyer · Samuel Alito; Sonia Sotomayor · Elena Kagan

Case opinions
- Majority: Alito, joined by Roberts, Kennedy, Breyer, Sotomayor
- Dissent: Scalia, joined by Thomas (Parts I and II)
- Dissent: Thomas, joined by Scalia (except first paragraph)
- Dissent: Ginsburg, joined by Scalia, Kagan

Laws applied
- U.S. Const. art. I, § 8, cl. 3

Comptroller of the Treasury of Maryland v. Wynne, 575 U.S. 542 (2015), is a 2015 U.S. Supreme Court case in which the court held that a state income-tax scheme that taxes residents for in-state and out-of-state income violates the Dormant Commerce Clause when it does not provide residents with full credit for the income taxes they pay to other states.

== Background ==
=== Dormant Commerce Clause ===
The Commerce Clause provides:

[The Congress shall have Power] To regulate Commerce with foreign Nations, and among the several States, and with the Indian Tribes;

— Article I, §8, clause 3

Although the text of the clause appears to be a simple grant of power to Congress, the Supreme Court has long held that the clause was intended to include a negative command prohibiting state taxation that discriminates against interstate commerce even if Congress has not acted. The doctrine, known as the Dormant Commerce Clause (or the "Negative Commerce Clause" by its detractors), "strikes at one of the chief evils that led to the adoption of the Constitution, namely, state tariffs and other laws that burdened interstate commerce."

=== Case background ===
Like most other U.S. states, Maryland imposes a tax on the income residents earn both in Maryland and out-of-state as well as on the income earned within Maryland by non-residents. The Maryland income tax consists of both a "state" income tax and a "county" income tax, both of which are collected by the state's comptroller of the treasury. Residents who earn income outside of Maryland may receive a credit against the state, but not the county income tax for income taxes paid on that income to other states. Nonresidents who earn income in Maryland must pay the state income tax and, in lieu of the county income tax, a "special nonresident tax" that was set at a rate "equal to the lowest county income tax rate set by any Maryland county."

In 2006, Maryland residents Brian and Karen Wynne, a married couple, earned income from other states through an S corporation, which filed state income tax returns in 39 states. An S Corporation passes income through to its shareholders for income tax purposes; in contrast, C corporations are considered separate entities from their shareholders for income tax purposes. On their 2006 tax return, the Wynnes claimed an income tax credit against both their state and county income taxes. The office of the Comptroller of the Treasury allowed the credit against the state, but not the county, income tax and, accordingly, assessed a deficiency. The Hearings and Appeals Section of the Comptroller's Office and, on appeal, the Maryland Tax Court both upheld the assessment. The Circuit Court for Howard County reversed, finding that the county income tax system violated the Commerce Clause. The Maryland Court of Appeals, the state's highest court, upheld the Circuit Court's ruling that Maryland's income tax scheme violated the Commerce Clause, finding that the tax scheme violated the fair apportionment and nondiscrimination prongs of the four-prong test enunciated by the Supreme Court in Complete Auto Transit, Inc. v. Brady.

The State of Maryland filed a petition for certiorari to the United States Supreme Court, which asked for the views of the Solicitor General of the United States. Solicitor General Donald B. Verrilli Jr. filed a brief recommending that the Supreme Court take the case and reverse the judgement of the Maryland state courts. On May 27, 2014, the Supreme Court announced that they would take the case. Oral arguments were heard on November 12 and the court's opinion was released on May 18, 2015.

== Opinion of the Court ==
=== Majority opinion ===
Justice Alito wrote the majority opinion, in which Chief Justice Roberts, Justice Kennedy, Justice Breyer, and Justice Sotomayor joined.

The majority upheld the Maryland Court of Appeals' ruling on the grounds of stare decisis, stating that "our existing dormant Commerce Clause cases all but dictate the result reached in this case." Three previous cases were "particularly instructive" in deciding the case; the cases all involved taxes on gross receipts that the Supreme Court struck down for posing the risk of multiple taxation. The majority rejected arguments that those cases involved gross receipts rather than net income and corporations rather than individuals. The majority also rejected the Comptroller's argument that individuals should be distinguished from corporations for the purposes of this case because individuals can vote to change the discriminatory tax scheme. In the majority's view, "the notion that the victims of such discrimination have a complete remedy at the polls is fanciful" and that "it is even more farfetched to suggest that natural persons with out-of-state income are better able to influence state lawmakers than large corporations headquartered in the State." They also found "no merit" in the Comptroller's argument that the statute is constitutional because it was not intended to discriminate against interstate commerce because the Commerce Clause "regulates effects, not motives, and it does not require courts to inquire into voters' or legislators' reasons for enacting a law that has a discriminatory effect." The majority also criticized the primary dissent's arguments—that the Dormant Commerce Clause does not limit the States' sovereign power to tax income of their residents, wherever earned—as "confus[ing] what a State may do without violating the Due Process Clause of the Fourteenth Amendment with what it may do without violating the Commerce Clause."

The majority proceeded to explain the history and merits of the "internal consistency test." The test considers the hypothetical situation in which every state adopted the tax structure in question and then asks whether interstate commerce would be at a disadvantage to intrastate commerce. The majority applied the internal consistency test to the hypothetical situation, paralleling Maryland's tax scheme, in which every state imposed a 1.25% income tax on residents' income earned within the state, a 1.25% income tax on residents' income earned in other states, and a 1.25% income tax on income earned by nonresidents within the state. In this case, intrastate income would only be taxed once at 1.25% but interstate income would always be taxed by both states involved (1.25% by the state of residence and 1.25% in the state where the income was earned). The majority, quoting West Lynn Creamery, Inc. v. Healy, thus found that "Maryland's tax scheme is inherently discriminatory and operates as a tariff...which is fatal because tariffs are '[t]he paradigmatic example of a law discriminating against interstate commerce.'"

== Subsequent developments ==
=== Maryland tax refunds ===
Following the ruling, Maryland offered refunds to Maryland residents who had paid the local income tax without a credit for income taxes paid to other states. Local governments in Maryland had prepared for the prospect of having to issue refunds before the Supreme Court issued its decision. The local governments were estimated to owe $200 million in refunds to 55,000 taxpayers, with $115 million (including interest) owed by Montgomery County alone. The state government planned to pay the refunds, then recover the refunded money from local governments by reducing future tax revenue distributions. Due to the statute of limitations, the refund was available to all taxpayers affected by the Wynne decision for 2011, 2012, 2013, and 2014; refunds for tax years as early as 2006 were available for some taxpayers who had filed a timely amended return.

In September 2015, Maryland governor Larry Hogan launched a campaign to raise awareness of the availability of tax refunds. Hogan, who assumed office in January 2015 after the Supreme Court had heard oral arguments in the case, relished that he had "the pleasure of sending refund checks." The Comptroller of the Treasury of Maryland, Peter Franchot, said he had an obligation to defend Maryland's tax scheme, but that he "always kind of secretly agreed with them."

=== Iowa tax refunds ===
Iowa's personal income tax scheme did not offer a credit for out-of-state taxes against an income tax surcharge for local school districts. After the Wynne decision, the state determined that this was unconstitutional and began to offer refunds for 2012, 2013, and 2014. The state estimated that if every eligible taxpayer filed to claim a refund the total amount would be $3 million annually for 2012, 2013, and 2014. The state would pay for the refunds from its general revenue fund, but local school districts would have to raise tax rates to cover the lost revenue in future tax years.
