= Omnicare, Inc. v. Laborers District Council Construction Industry Pension Fund =

- Supreme Court of the United States

Decided March 24, 2015
- Full case name: Omnicare, Inc. v. Laborers District Council Construction Industry Pension Fund
- Citations: 575 U.S. 175 (more)

Holding
- Under the Securities Act of 1933, the issuer of a security is not liable for a statement of opinion simply because the stated opinion ultimately proves incorrect. On the other hand, the issuer is liable for the omissions of material facts from a stated opinion where those facts conflict with what a reasonable investor would take from the statement.

Court membership
- Chief Justice John Roberts Associate Justices Antonin Scalia · Anthony Kennedy; Clarence Thomas · Ruth Bader Ginsburg; Stephen Breyer · Samuel Alito; Sonia Sotomayor · Elena Kagan

Case opinions
- Majority: Kagan, joined by unanimous
- Concurrence: Thomas

Omnicare, Inc. v. Laborers District Council Construction Industry Pension Fund, 575 U.S. 175 (2015), was a United States Supreme Court case in which the court held that, under the Securities Act of 1933, the issuer of a security is not liable for a statement of opinion simply because the stated opinion ultimately proves incorrect. On the other hand, the issuer is liable for the omissions of material facts from a stated opinion where those facts conflict with what a reasonable investor would take from the statement.

== Background ==
The Securities Act of 1933 requires that a company wishing to issue securities must first file a registration statement containing specified information about the issuing company and the securities offered. The registration statement may also include other representations of fact or opinion. To protect investors and promote compliance with these disclosure requirements, Section 11 of the act creates two ways to hold issuers liable for a registration statement's contents: A purchaser of securities may sue an issuer if the registration statement either "contain[s] an untrue statement of a material fact" or "omit[s] to state a material fact... necessary to make the statements therein not misleading." In either case, the buyer need not prove that the issuer acted with any intent to deceive or defraud.

Omnicare, a pharmacy-services company, filed a registration statement in connection with a public offering of common stock. In addition to the required disclosures, the registration statement contained two statements expressing the company's opinion that it was in compliance with federal and state laws. After the federal government filed suit against Omnicare for allegedly receiving kickbacks from pharmaceutical manufacturers, respondents, pension funds that purchased Omnicare stock (hereinafter Funds), sued Omnicare under Section 11. They claimed that Omnicare's legal-compliance statements constituted "untrue statement[s] of... material fact" and that Omnicare "omitted to state [material] facts necessary" to make those statements not misleading.

The federal district court granted Omnicare's motion to dismiss. Because the Funds had not alleged that Omnicare's officers knew they were violating the law, the court found that the Funds had failed to state a Section 11 claim. The Sixth Circuit Court of Appeals reversed. Acknowledging that the statements at issue expressed opinions, the court held that no showing of subjective disbelief was required. In the court's view, the Funds' allegations that Omnicare's legal-compliance opinions were objectively false sufficed to support their claim.

== Opinion of the court ==
The Supreme Court issued an opinion on March 24, 2015.
