= Kellogg Brown & Root Services, Inc. v. United States ex rel. Carter =

- Supreme Court of the United States

Argued January 13, 2015 Decided May 26, 2015
- Full case name: Kellogg Brown & Root Services, Inc. v. United States ex rel. Carter
- Docket no.: 12-1497
- Citations: 575 U.S. 650 (more) 135 S. Ct. 1970; 191 L. Ed. 2d 899
- Opinion announcement: Opinion announcement

Case history
- Prior: United States ex rel. Carter v. Halliburton Co., 710 F.3d 171 (4th Cir. 2013); cert. granted, 573 U. S. 957 (2014).

Holding
- The Wartime Suspension of Limitations Act only applies to criminal offenses.

Court membership
- Chief Justice John Roberts Associate Justices Antonin Scalia · Anthony Kennedy; Clarence Thomas · Ruth Bader Ginsburg; Stephen Breyer · Samuel Alito; Sonia Sotomayor · Elena Kagan

Case opinion
- Majority: Alito, joined by unanimous

Kellogg Brown & Root Services, Inc. v. United States ex rel. Carter, 575 U.S. 650 (2015), was a United States Supreme Court involving KBR and a former KRB contractor, Benjamin Carter. In a unanimous opinion written by Associate Justice Samuel Alito, the Court held that Wartime Suspension of Limitations Act only applies to criminal offenses. The Court also held that qui tam lawsuits filed under the False Claims Act are no longer considered "pending" after they have been dismissed.

== See also ==
- List of United States Supreme Court cases
- Lists of United States Supreme Court cases by volume
- List of United States Supreme Court cases by the Roberts Court
