= United States v. Kwai Fun Wong =

- Supreme Court of the United States

Argued December 10, 2014 Decided April 22, 2015
- Full case name: United States v. Kwai Fun Wong
- Citations: 575 U.S. 402 (more)

Holding
- The statutes of limitations within the Federal Tort Claims Act are subject to equitable tolling because they have not been expressly tagged by Congress as jurisdictional.

Court membership
- Chief Justice John Roberts Associate Justices Antonin Scalia · Anthony Kennedy; Clarence Thomas · Ruth Bader Ginsburg; Stephen Breyer · Samuel Alito; Sonia Sotomayor · Elena Kagan

Case opinions
- Majority: Kagan, joined by Kennedy, Ginsburg, Breyer, Sotomayor
- Dissent: Alito, joined by Roberts, Scalia, Thomas

United States v. Kwai Fun Wong, 575 U.S. 402 (2015), was a United States Supreme Court case in which the court held that the statutes of limitations within the Federal Tort Claims Act are subject to equitable tolling because they have not been expressly tagged by Congress as jurisdictional.

== Background ==
The Federal Tort Claims Act (FTCA) provides that a tort claim against the United States "shall be forever barred" unless the claimant meets two deadlines. First, a claim must be presented to the appropriate federal agency for administrative review "within two years after [the] claim accrues." Second, if the agency denies the claim, the claimant may file suit in federal court "within six months" of the agency's denial.

Kwai Fun Wong and Marlene June, respondents in Nos. 13–1074 and 13-1075, respectively, each missed one of those deadlines. Wong failed to file her FTCA claim in federal court within six months, but argued that that was only because the federal district court had not permitted her to file that claim until after the period expired. June failed to present her FTCA claim to a federal agency within two years, but argued that her untimely filing should be excused because the government had, in her view, concealed facts vital to her claim. In each case, the district court dismissed the FTCA claim for failure to satisfy the statutes of limitations, holding that, despite any justification for delay, those time bars are jurisdictional and not subject to equitable tolling. The Ninth Circuit Court of Appeals reversed in both cases, concluding that the statutes of limitations may be equitably tolled.

== Opinion of the court ==
The Supreme Court issued an opinion on April 22, 2015. In a 5/4 split opinion delivered by Justice Kagan, the court ruled that the presumption of equitable tolling is available in federal suits. That presumption can be rebutted with evidence, and Congress can legislate that the time limit be jurisdictional, but in the case of the FTCA no such limitation was clearly made. Justice Alito authored a dissenting opinion.
