= Alabama Department of Revenue v. CSX Transportation, Inc. =

- Supreme Court of the United States

Argued December 9, 2014 Decided March 4, 2015
- Full case name: Alabama Department of Revenue, et al., Petitioners v. CSX Transportation, Inc.
- Docket no.: 13-553
- Citations: 575 U.S. 21 (more) 135 S. Ct. 1136; 191 L. Ed. 2d 113

Case history
- Prior: CSX Transp., Inc. v. Ala. Dep't of Revenue, 892 F. Supp. 2d 1300 (N.D. Ala. 2012); reversed, 720 F.3d 863 (11th Cir. 2013); cert. granted, 134 S. Ct. 2900 (2014).

Holding
- In determining sales tax discrimination, courts must view the state's tax scheme as a whole rather than just the challenged provision.

Court membership
- Chief Justice John Roberts Associate Justices Antonin Scalia · Anthony Kennedy; Clarence Thomas · Ruth Bader Ginsburg; Stephen Breyer · Samuel Alito; Sonia Sotomayor · Elena Kagan

Case opinions
- Majority: Scalia, joined by Roberts, Kennedy, Breyer, Alito, Sotomayor, Kagan
- Dissent: Thomas, joined by Ginsburg

Laws applied
- Railroad Revitalization and Regulation Reform Act of 1976

Alabama Department of Revenue v. CSX Transportation, Inc., 575 U.S. 21 (2015), was a United States Supreme Court case in which the Court ruled that railroads like CSX can compare their tax treatment to competing transportation companies under federal law. The Court sent the case back to a lower court to determine whether Alabama’s tax differences were justified.

The Court held that "the Eleventh Circuit properly concluded that CSX's competitors are an appropriate comparison class for the Railroad Revitalization and Regulation Reform Act of 1976's subsection (b)(4) claim." The Act prohibits states from imposing "another tax that discriminates against a rail carrier" and the Court found that the Eleventh Circuit "erred in refusing to consider whether Alabama could justify its decision to exempt motor carriers from its sales and use taxes through its decision to subject motor carriers to a fuel excise tax."

== Opinion of the Court ==
Associate Justice Antonin Scalia authored the Court's 7–2 decision.
