= Harris v. Viegelahn =

- Supreme Court of the United States

Argued April 1, 2015 Decided May 18, 2015
- Full case name: Charles E. Harris, III, Petitioner v. Mary K. Viegelahn, Chapter 13 Trustee
- Docket no.: 14-400
- Citations: 575 U.S. 498 (more) 135 S. Ct. 1829; 191 L. Ed. 2d 783

Case history
- Prior: In re Harris, 491 B.R. 866 (W.D. Tex. 2013); reversed, 757 F.3d 468 (5th Cir. 2014); cert. granted, 135 S. Ct. 782 (2014).
- Subsequent: On remand, 608 F. App'x 252 (5th Cir. 2015)

Holding
- A debtor who converts to Chapter 7 bankruptcy is entitled to return of any post-petition wages not yet distributed by the Chapter 13 trustee.

Court membership
- Chief Justice John Roberts Associate Justices Antonin Scalia · Anthony Kennedy; Clarence Thomas · Ruth Bader Ginsburg; Stephen Breyer · Samuel Alito; Sonia Sotomayor · Elena Kagan

Case opinion
- Majority: Ginsburg, joined by unanimous

Harris v. Viegelahn, 575 U.S. 498 (2015), was a United States Supreme Court case in which the Court clarified procedures for disposing wages after a debtor files for bankruptcy. In a unanimous opinion written by Justice Ruth Bader Ginsburg, the Court held that if a debtor earns money after filing Chapter 13 bankruptcy proceedings, and converts to Chapter 7 bankruptcy before the money is sent to creditors, the debtor is permitted to keep those funds.

== Opinion of the Court ==
Associate Justice Ruth Bader Ginsburg authored the unanimous opinion of the Court, which reversed the opinion of the United States Court of Appeals for the Fifth Circuit and remanded the case to that court for further proceedings.
