= Young v. United Parcel Service =

- Supreme Court of the United States

Argued December 3, 2014 Decided March 25, 2015
- Full case name: Peggy Young, Petitioner v. United Parcel Service, Inc.
- Docket no.: 12-1226
- Citations: 575 U.S. 206 (more) 135 S. Ct. 1338; 191 L. Ed. 2d 279

Case history
- Prior: 784 F.3d 192 (4th Cir. 2013)

Holding
- To bring a disparate treatment claim under the Pregnancy Discrimination Act, a pregnant employee must show that the employer refused to provide accommodations and that the employer later provided accommodations to other employees with similar restrictions.

Court membership
- Chief Justice John Roberts Associate Justices Antonin Scalia · Anthony Kennedy; Clarence Thomas · Ruth Bader Ginsburg; Stephen Breyer · Samuel Alito; Sonia Sotomayor · Elena Kagan

Case opinions
- Majority: Breyer, joined by Roberts, Ginsburg, Sotomayor, Kagan
- Concurrence: Alito (in judgment)
- Dissent: Scalia, joined by Kennedy, Thomas
- Dissent: Kennedy

Laws applied
- Pregnancy Discrimination Act; Americans with Disabilities Act of 1990

Young v. United Parcel Service, 575 U.S. 206 (2015), is a United States Supreme Court case that the Court evaluated the requirements for bringing a disparate treatment claim under the Pregnancy Discrimination Act. In a 6–3 decision, the Court held that to bring such a claim, a pregnant employee must show that their employer refused to provide accommodations and that the employer later provided accommodations to other employees with similar restrictions. The Court then remanded the case to the United States Court of Appeals for the Fourth Circuit to determine whether the employer engaged in discrimination under this new test.

== Background ==
=== Pregnancy Discrimination Act ===
In 1978, the United States Congress passed the Pregnancy Discrimination Act, amending Title VII of the Civil Rights Act of 1964 to "prohibit sex discrimination on the basis of pregnancy," as a direct response to the Court's ruling in General Electric Company v. Gilbert. The Act mandates that employers must treat “women affected by pregnancy . . . the same for all employment-related purposes . . . as other persons not so affected but similar in their ability or inability to work.” However, the Act provides exceptions for a "legitimate, nondiscriminatory, nonpretextual justification for these differences in treatment."

=== Initial lawsuit ===
In 2006, Peggy Young was working as a delivery driver for United Parcel Service when she requested time off in order to undergo in vitro fertilization. After becoming pregnant, Young's doctors advised her that "she should not lift more than 20 pounds during the first 20 weeks of her pregnancy or more than 10 pounds thereafter." United Parcel Service (UPS) requires that delivery drivers be able to lift parcels up to 70 pounds (150 pounds with assistance). Young informed UPS that she could not work while under a lifting restriction and stayed home without pay during most of the time she was pregnant. Because of her time away from work, Young lost her employee medical coverage. She then filed suit in federal court, claiming that "UPS acted unlawfully in refusing to accommodate her pregnancy-related lifting restriction."

== Decision ==
Justice Stephen Breyer's majority opinion stated that the key inquiry was "whether the nature of the employer’s policy and the way in which it burdens pregnant women shows that the employer has engaged in intentional discrimination." He provided a balancing test for determining whether employers engaged in intentional discrimination under the terms of the Act. The test provided, "A worker making a claim that her company intentionally treated her differently due to her pregnancy must show that she sought an accommodation, her company refused and then granted accommodations to others suffering from similar restrictions. The company, in turn, can try to show that its reasons were legitimate — but not because it is more expensive or less convenient to add pregnant women to the categories of workers who are accommodated." To determine whether UPS engaged in discrimination under the terms of the new test, the Court remanded the case to the United States Court of Appeals for the Fourth Circuit for further proceedings.

In a concurring opinion, Justice Samuel Alito stated that the wording of one of the clauses of the Act "adds a further requirement of equal treatment irrespective of intent." Therefore, he argued that pregnant employees must also be compared with other employees performing similar jobs with similar abilities.

In dissent, Justice Antonin Scalia argued that the primary intent of the Act was to clarify that pregnancy discrimination falls under the general definition of sex discrimination and that the majority opinion is instead basically crafting a new law.

Justice Anthony Kennedy wrote a separate dissent, stating that the majority interpreted the Act in a way that conflates "disparate impact" with "disparate treatment" and would result in confusion in litigating pregnancy discrimination cases.

== See also ==
- List of United States Supreme Court cases
- List of United States Supreme Court cases, volume 575
