= Department of Transportation v. Association of American Railroads =

- Supreme Court of the United States

Argued December 8, 2014 Decided March 9, 2015
- Full case name: Department of Transportation, et al., Petitioners v. Association of American Railroads
- Docket no.: 13-1080
- Citations: 575 U.S. 43 (more) 135 S. Ct. 1225; 191 L. Ed. 2d 153

Case history
- Prior: Summary judgment granted for defendants. Associationn of American Railroads v. Department of Transportation, 865 F.Supp.2d 22 (D.D.C. 2012).; Reversed. Associationn of American Railroads v. United States Department of Transportation, 721 F.3d 666 (D.C. Cir. 2013).; Rehearing en banc denied. No. 12-5204 (D.C. Cir. 2013).; Cert. granted. Department of Transportation v. Association of American Railroads, 573 U.S. 930 (2014).
- Subsequent: Reversed. Association of American Railroads v. Department of Transportation, 821 F.3d 19 (D.C. Cir. 2016).; Rehearing en banc denied. Association of American Railroads v. Department of Transportation, No. 12-5204 (D.C. Cir. 2016).; Judgment entered for plaintiffs. Association of American Railroads v. United States Department of Transportation, No. 11-cv-1499 (D.D.C. 2017).; Reversed. Association of American Railroads v. United States Department of Transportation, 896 F.3d 539 (D.C. Cir. 2018).; Rehearing en banc denied. Association of American Railroads v. United States Department of Transportation, No. 17-5123 (D.C. Cir. 2018).; Cert. denied. Association of American Railroads v. Department of Transportation, 587 U.S. ___ (2019).

Questions presented
- Whether Section 207 of the Passenger Rail Investment and Improvement Act of 2008 effects an unconstitutional delegation of legislative power to a private entity.

Holding
- For purposes of determining the validity of the metrics and standards, Amtrak is a governmental entity.

Court membership
- Chief Justice John Roberts Associate Justices Antonin Scalia · Anthony Kennedy; Clarence Thomas · Ruth Bader Ginsburg; Stephen Breyer · Samuel Alito; Sonia Sotomayor · Elena Kagan

Case opinions
- Majority: Kennedy, joined by Roberts, Scalia, Ginsburg, Breyer, Alito, Sotomayor, Kagan
- Concurrence: Alito
- Concurrence: Thomas (in judgment)

Department of Transportation v. Association of American Railroads, 575 U.S. 43 (2015), was a United States Supreme Court case in which the Court held "for purposes of determining the validity of the metrics and standards, Amtrak is a governmental entity."

== Opinion of the Court ==
Associate Justice Anthony Kennedy authored the Opinion of the Court, remanding the case back to the United States Court of Appeals for the District of Columbia Circuit.

Associate Justice Samuel Alito authored a concurring opinion, while Associate Justice Clarence Thomas authored an opinion concurring in the judgment.

Thomas's opinion focuses on the separation of executive and legislative powers.

Today, the Court has abandoned all pretense of enforcing a qualitative distinction between legislative and executive power. To the extent that the 'intelligible principle' test was ever an adequate means of enforcing that distinction, it has been decoupled from the historical understanding of the legislative and executive powers and thus does not keep executive "lawmaking" within the bounds of inherent executive discretion.

He goes on to state that "Section 207 therefore violates the Constitution. Article I, §1, vests the legislative power in Congress, and Amtrak is not Congress. The procedures that §207 sets forth for enacting the metrics and standards also do not comply with bicameralism and presentment. Art. I, §7. For these reasons, the metrics and standards promulgated under this provision are invalid."

== See also ==
- List of United States Supreme Court cases
- List of United States Supreme Court cases, volume 575
- Lebron v. National Railroad Passenger Corp.
