= Coleman v. Tollefson =

- Supreme Court of the United States

Argued February 23, 2015 Decided May 18, 2015
- Full case name: Andre Lee Coleman, aka Andre Lee Coleman-Bey, Petitioner v. Todd Tollefson et al.
- Docket no.: 13-1333
- Citations: 575 U.S. 532 (more) 135 S. Ct. 1759; 191 L. Ed. 2d 803
- Opinion announcement: Opinion announcement

Case history
- Prior: 733 F.3d 175 (6th Cir. 2013); cert. granted, 135 S. Ct. 43 (2014).

Holding
- 28 U.S.C. § 1915(g) prevents prisoners from proceeding in forma pauperis if three previous lawsuits have been dismissed on the grounds that it is frivolous, malicious, or fails to state a claim upon which relief may be granted, even if an appeal is pending for one of those suits.

Court membership
- Chief Justice John Roberts Associate Justices Antonin Scalia · Anthony Kennedy; Clarence Thomas · Ruth Bader Ginsburg; Stephen Breyer · Samuel Alito; Sonia Sotomayor · Elena Kagan

Case opinion
- Majority: Breyer, joined by unanimous

Laws applied
- 28 U.S.C. § 1915

Coleman v. Tollefson, 575 U.S. 532 (2015), is a United States Supreme Court case dealing with a prisoner's inability to file lawsuits in forma pauperis after filing 3 lawsuits which are dismissed because they are "frivolous, malicious, or [fail] to state a claim upon which relief may be granted."

== Background ==
28 U.S.C. § 1915 allows federal litigants who are too poor to pay court fees to proceed in forma pauperis, allowing them to file without prepaying court costs. § 1915(g) provides an exception for prisoners who have "on 3 or more occasions, while incarcerated..., brought an action or appeal in a court of the United States that was dismissed on the grounds that it is frivolous, malicious, or fails to state a claim upon which relief may be granted." Coleman was a prisoner who had 3 actions dismissed by a Federal Court on those grounds, and while his appeal of the third was pending, filed four new federal lawsuits. Coleman's motion to proceed in forma pauperis was denied on the basis of §1915(g), and Coleman appealed on the basis that the third dismissal did not count because his appeal of it was pending. The decision to deny Coleman's in forma pauperis motion was affirmed by the District Court, and the Sixth Circuit. Coleman appealed to the United States Supreme Court, who granted certiorari, referring to Henslee v. Keller, which lists (and agrees with) seven other circuit courts who disagreed with the Sixth Circuit.

== Opinion of the Court ==
The Supreme Court affirmed the Sixth Circuit's decision, stating that a dismissal counts "even if the dismissal is the subject of an appeal". The court acknowledged the risk that a prisoner might be wronged deprived of in forma pauperis status for lawsuits filed after a third dismissal but before reversal of said dismissal on appeal. However, the court considers this risk minor because the Solicitor General could only find two cases where a Court of Appeals reversed a prisoner's third dismissal by a District Court. Coleman also presents the hypothetical situation where in forma pauperis status is denied for an appeal of the third dismissal because of the third dismissal, stating that such a situation would be unfair. Although the Solicitor General (arguing on behalf of the government) agreed with Coleman regarding this point, the Supreme Court declined to decide on the point, stating that if "the situation Coleman hypothesizes does arise, the courts can consider the problem in context."
