= Kerry v. Din =

- Supreme Court of the United States

Argued February 23, 2015 Decided June 15, 2015
- Full case name: John F. Kerry, Secretary of State, et al., Petitioners v. Fauzia Din
- Docket no.: 13-1402
- Citations: 576 U.S. 86 (more) 135 S. Ct. 2128; 192 L. Ed. 2d 183
- Argument: Oral argument
- Opinion announcement: Opinion announcement

Case history
- Prior: Motion to dismiss granted, Din v. Clinton, No. 3:10-cv-00533, 2010 WL 2560492 (N.D. Cal. Jun. 22, 2010); reversed, Din v. Kerry, 718 F.3d 856 (9th Cir. 2013); cert. granted, 135 S. Ct. 44 (2014).

Holding
- Consular agents did not violate procedural due process when they did not disclose reasons for denying a visa application.

Court membership
- Chief Justice John Roberts Associate Justices Antonin Scalia · Anthony Kennedy; Clarence Thomas · Ruth Bader Ginsburg; Stephen Breyer · Samuel Alito; Sonia Sotomayor · Elena Kagan

Case opinions
- Plurality: Scalia, joined by Roberts, Thomas
- Concurrence: Kennedy (in judgment), joined by Alito
- Dissent: Breyer, joined by Ginsburg, Sotomayor, Kagan

Laws applied
- U.S. Const. amend. V

Kerry v. Din, 576 U.S. 86 (2015), was a United States Supreme Court case in which the Court analyzed whether there is a constitutional right to live in the United States with one's spouse and whether procedural due process requires consular officials to give notice of reasons for denying a visa application. In Justice Anthony Kennedy's concurring opinion, the controlling opinion in this case, he wrote that notice requirements “[do] not apply when, as in this case, a visa application is denied due to terrorism or national security concerns.” Because the consular officials satisfied notice requirements, there was no need for the Court to address the constitutional question about the right to live with one's spouse.

Writing for a plurality of the Court, (Note: In plurality opinions, a majority of Justices agree upon the proper disposition of the case, but “no single rationale explaining the result enjoys the assent of five justices.” When analyzing a plurality opinion, “the holding of the Court may be viewed as that position taken by those Members who concurred in the judgments on the narrowest grounds . . . .”) Justice Antonin Scalia wrote that there is no constitutional right to live with one’s spouse, and because Din was not denied “life, liberty, or property,” she was not entitled to due process. Justice Stephen Breyer wrote a dissenting opinion in which he argued that Din was denied liberty without due process of law, and that there is a fundamental right for spouses to “live together and to raise a family,” which enjoys basic due process protections. In the weeks following the announcement of the Court's decision, some analysts suggested the Justices' opinions in Kerry v. Din would foreshadow the outcome in Obergefell v. Hodges.

== Background ==
=== Immigration and Nationality Act visa requirements ===
The Immigration and Nationality Act prohibits non-citizens from entering the United States without a visa. The Act allows individuals classified as "immediate relatives" of those living in the United States to apply for a visa at a United States Embassy or consular office. However, non-citizen "immediate relatives" are ineligible for admission into the United States if they provide "material support to a terrorist organization" or serve "as a terrorist organization’s representative."

=== Kanishka Berashk's visa application ===
Fauzia Din arrived to the United States from Afghanistan as a refugee in the year 2000, and she became a naturalized citizen in 2007. In 2006, she married Kanishka Berashk, who was a former civil servant in Afghanistan during the Taliban regime. Din filed paperwork to classify Berashk as an "immediate relative," and Berashk filed a visa application to gain entry to the United States. The United States Embassy in Islamabad, Pakistan reviewed Berashk's application and conducted an interview but ultimately denied his visa application. A consular official informed Berashk he was ineligible for entry under the portion of the Immigration and Nationality Act that precludes admission for individuals with connections to terrorist organizations, but the official provided no further explanation for this determination.

=== Initial legal challenges ===
Because Berashk was an unadmitted, non-resident alien, he had no right of entry into the United States and could not challenge his denial of his visa application. Consequently, Din filed suit in United States District Court, where she claimed the government denied her due process of law by depriving her of her "constitutional right to live in the United States with her spouse" and for denying her husband's visa application without adequate explanation. The District Court rejected Din's claims, but the Ninth Circuit Court of Appeals reversed, concluding that Din had "a protected liberty interest in marriage that entitled [her] to review of the denial of [her] spouse’s visa." The United States appealed, and the Supreme Court granted certiorari on October 2, 2014.

== Judgment of the Court ==
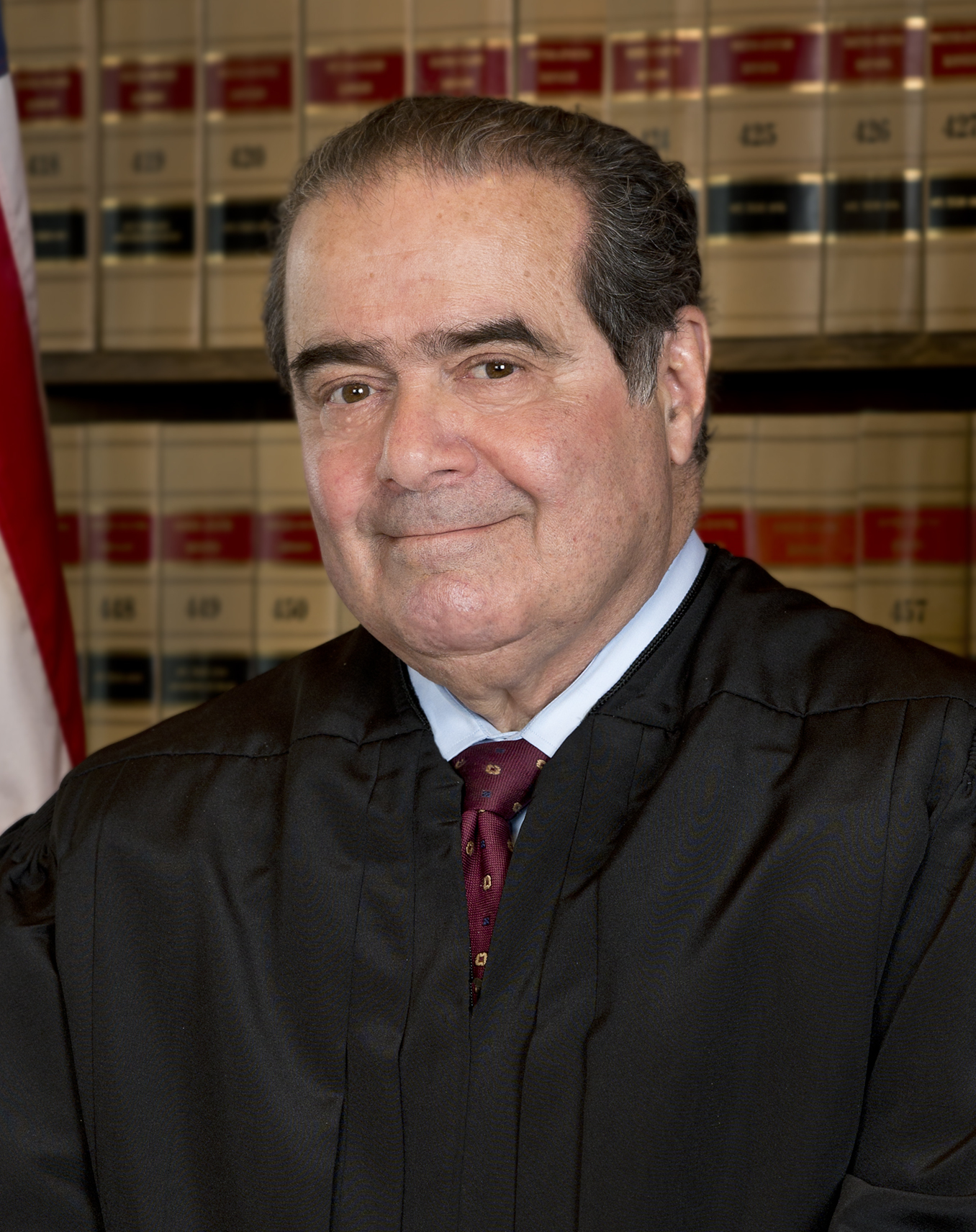
Justice Scalia, author of the plurality opinion

In his plurality opinion, Justice Antonin Scalia wrote that there is no constitutional right to live in the United States with one's spouse. He argued that under the Fifth Amendment's due process clause, citizens are only entitled to redress if they are denied "life, liberty, or property." Because visa applications have not historically been understood as "life, liberty, or property," the denial of a visa application does not implicate Fifth Amendment due process protections. Additionally, Justice Scalia rejected the argument that the denial of the visa application implicated a fundamental liberty interest. Although Justice Scalia conceded that Loving v. Virginia and its progeny “invok[e] a fundamental right to marriage,” the parties “implicitly concede that no such right has been infringed in this case.”

=== Justice Kennedy's concurring opinion ===
In Justice Anthony Kennedy's opinion concurring in the judgment, he argued that the Court need not rule upon whether Din has a right to live with her spouse. Even if the Court assumed that Din did have a fundamental liberty interest in living with her spouse, "the notice she received regarding her husband’s visa denial satisfied due process." Justice Kennedy concluded that notice requirements “[do] not apply when, as in this case, a visa application is denied due to terrorism or national security concerns.”

=== Justice Breyer's dissenting opinion ===
Justice Stephen Breyer wrote a dissent in which he argued that consular officials had denied Din due process by preventing her from living with her husband. He wrote that the Supreme Court "has long recognized, the institution of marriage, which encompasses the right of spouses to live together and to raise a family, is central to human life, requires and enjoys community support, and plays a central role in most individuals’ 'orderly pursuit of happiness.'" Additionally, Justice Breyer argued that the notice provided to Berashk was inadequate, and was the equivalent of "telling a criminal defendant only that he is accused of 'breaking the law.'"

== Commentary and analysis ==
=== Reaction to the Court's decision ===
In the weeks following the Court's decision, some analysts criticized the Court's ruling for focusing too much attention on "social norms" and not enough attention on the realities of the immigrant experience. The Los Angeles Times' editorial board criticized the Court for allowing consular officials to deny a visa "simply by asserting a vague connection to terrorism." Others noted that the lack of a majority opinion meant that the case would likely have little precedential value in the future. Because Justice Kennedy was the only Justice to not author a majority opinion from the February sitting, some commentators believed that he was initially assigned the role of writing an opinion for the majority of the Court, but three justices defected sometime after the assignment was made. In June 2015, Nina Totenberg reported that Din was in the process of submitting further character evidence about her husband to the State Department so that officials can re-evaluate Berashk's visa application.

=== Speculation about Obergefell v. Hodges ===
In light of the case's extensive discussion about fundamental rights associated with marriage, analysts suggested the Justices' views in Kerry v. Din would foreshadow the outcome of Court's upcoming decision in Obergefell v. Hodges. Some commentators even described the opinion as a "proxy war" for the debate in Obergefell. Other commentators opined that Justice Kennedy's narrow concurrence in Kerry v. Din was evidence he would ultimately write the majority opinion in Obergefell. When the Court ultimately released its decision in Obergefell, Justice Kennedy was the author of the majority's opinion, while Chief Justice Roberts, Justice Alito, Justice Scalia, and Justice Thomas all wrote dissenting opinions.

== Subsequent developments ==
In Department of State v. Muñoz (2024), the Supreme Court considered the same legal question again – this time with a majority adopting the rationale of the plurality opinion in Kerry v. Din. In an opinion by Justice Amy Coney Barrett, the Court held that a "citizen does not have a fundamental liberty interest in her noncitizen spouse being admitted to the country."

== See also ==
- List of United States Supreme Court cases, volume 576
- List of United States Supreme Court cases
- Fifth Amendment to the United States Constitution
- Loving v. Virginia (1967)
