= BP p.l.c. v. Mayor and City Council of Baltimore =

- Supreme Court of the United States

Argued January 19, 2021 Decided May 17, 2021
- Full case name: BP p.l.c., et al. v. Mayor and City Council of Baltimore
- Docket no.: 19-1189
- Citations: 593 U.S. ___ (more) 141 S. Ct. 1532; 209 L. Ed. 2d 631

Case history
- Prior: Motion to remand granted, Mayor & City Council of Baltimore v. BP P.L.C., 388 F. Supp. 3d 538 (D. Md. 2019); Affirmed, 952 F.3d 452 (4th Cir. 2020); Cert. granted, 141 S. Ct. 222 (2020)
- Subsequent: District court order affirmed again on remand, Mayor & City Council of Baltimore v. BP P.L.C., 31 F.4th 178 (4th Cir. 2022)

Holding
- The Fourth Circuit erred in holding that it lacked jurisdiction to consider all of the defendants’ grounds for removal under §1447(d).

Court membership
- Chief Justice John Roberts Associate Justices Clarence Thomas · Stephen Breyer; Samuel Alito · Sonia Sotomayor; Elena Kagan · Neil Gorsuch; Brett Kavanaugh · Amy Coney Barrett

Case opinions
- Majority: Gorsuch, joined by Roberts, Thomas, Breyer, Kagan, Kavanaugh, Barrett
- Dissent: Sotomayor
- Alito took no part in the consideration or decision of the case.

Laws applied
- Removal Clarification Act

BP p.l.c. v. Mayor and City Council of Baltimore, 593 U.S. ___ (2021), was a case in the United States Supreme Court dealing with matters of jurisdiction of various climate change lawsuits in the United States judicial system.

== Background ==
Around 2017, multiple cities in the United States began filing lawsuits against oil & gas companies, asserting their worldwide activities in mining and production of petroleum products were responsible for climate change effects in their cities and states. The lawsuits broadly sought financial compensation from these companies under their individual state laws to recuperate for costs in fighting changes that arose from climate change, such as offsetting the effects of rising sea levels. Some of the early cases, such as those filed in California and New York City, were first filed in the federal court system; these cases were dismissed early as at the federal level, case law persists that federal laws like the Clear Air Act superseded state laws, and it would be up to the legislative and executive branches to take action against the oil companies under these laws, rather than state and local government.

The city of Baltimore, Maryland, filed its suit against 26 oil companies in July 2018, asserting that these companies contributed to 15 percent of the carbon dioxide emissions between 1965 and 2015 that led to the world's climate change that was threatening its shorelines. Instead of in federal court, the city filed it within the Maryland state courts, which legal experts believed was a viable alternative to the federal court, and would likely be more favorable to the city. This was not the only such climate change lawsuit filed at the state level against the oil companies, and as with these other suits, the defendants requested change of venue to the federal courts under the federal-officer removal statute under the Removal Clarification Act at 28 U.S.C. § 1441, since they operated closely with the federal government. The case was moved to United States District Court for the District of Maryland.

The city subsequently challenged the removal by citing the lack of subject-matter jurisdiction that the federal court had over state laws, which Judge Ellen Hollander agreed to, ordering the case back to the state court. As the standard for removal puts the onus on the party seeking removal, Judge Hollander rejected the reasons given by the oil companies for keeping the case at the federal level. The defendants appealed to the Fourth Circuit on Hollander's order, but the Fourth Circuit upheld it, ruling that the federal-officer exemption did not apply to the companies despite their close-workings with the federal government.

== Supreme Court ==
The Fourth Circuit's decision furthered a circuit split with how appellate courts can review challenges to the federal-officer removal statute. The Fourth Circuit's decision was shared by seven other circuits in which the appellate court can only look at the circumstances on the removal jurisdiction, while the Seventh Circuit had recently joined the opinion of the Fourth and Fifth Circuit's view in which appellate courts can review other relevant matters to the case to make their determination. The oil companies had argued that if their case was handled under the Seventh Circuit, they would have been able to maintain the federal jurisdiction based on the argument that federal laws supersede state laws.

The oil companies petitioned to the Supreme Court to resolve the circuit split with regards to the federal-officer removal statute. The Court certified the petition in October 2020. Justice Samuel Alito, who owns stock in several of the oil companies, had recused himself from the case. Justice Amy Coney Barrett, whose father had worked for the Shell Oil Company, one of the defendants in Baltimore's case, was asked to recuse herself from the case by several amicus brief submitters, as she had previously recused herself from similar cases involving Shell during her tenure at the Seventh Circuit, but she did not do so for this case.

Oral arguments were heard on January 19, 2021.

The Court issued its decision on May 17, 2021. In a 7–1 ruling, the Court vacated the Fourth Circuit's decision and remanded the case for further review. The majority opinion was written by Justice Neil Gorsuch and joined by all but Justice Sonia Sotomayor (and the aforementioned recused Justice Alito). The majority agreed with BP and other petitioning companies that the Fourth Circuit erred in considering all factors for review to deny the change of jurisdiction requested by the city, thus vacating their decision but otherwise not ruling on the merits of Baltimore's complaints related to the petitioners. Gorsuch in his option stated that the law in question "provides that ‘[a]n order remanding a case to the State court from which it was removed is not reviewable on appeal or otherwise, except that an order remanding a case to the State court from which it was removed pursuant to section 1442 or 1443 of this title shall be reviewable by appeal or otherwise.'" As the law itself was vague, Gorsuch continued that "In the end, all of the parties’ fencing about language Congress didn’t use persuades us of only one thing — that we are best served by focusing on the language it did employ."

Sotomayor wrote the dissent, stating her concern that the decision "will reward defendants for raising strained theories of removal".

By May 24, 2021, the Court subsequently granted review of three other similar cases in which a city or state had successfully changed jurisdiction in an environmental lawsuit, vacating the Circuit court rulings that allowed these changes to proceed on the basis of the BP opinion, and remanding these cases for further review.

== Supreme Court of Maryland ==
In March 2026, the Supreme Court of Maryland dismissed the case.
