= Henderson v. United States (2015) =

- Supreme Court of the United States

Argued February 24, 2015 Decided May 18, 2015
- Full case name: Tony Henderson v. United States
- Docket no.: 13-1487
- Citations: 575 U.S. 622 (more) 135 S. Ct. 1780; 191 L. Ed. 2d 874

Case history
- Prior: No. 3:06–cr–2011, 2012 WL 11922151 (M.D. Fla. Aug. 9, 2012); 555 F. App'x 851 (11th Cir. 2014) (per curiam); cert. granted, 135 S. Ct. 402 (2014).
- Subsequent: 795 F.3d 1254 (11th Cir. 2015) (per curiam).

Holding
- A court-ordered transfer of a felon’s lawfully owned firearms from Government custody to a third party is not barred by §922(g) if the court is satisfied that the recipient will not give the felon control over the firearms, so that he could either use them or direct their use.

Court membership
- Chief Justice John Roberts Associate Justices Antonin Scalia · Anthony Kennedy; Clarence Thomas · Ruth Bader Ginsburg; Stephen Breyer · Samuel Alito; Sonia Sotomayor · Elena Kagan

Case opinion
- Majority: Kagan, joined by unanimous

Laws applied
- 18 U.S.C. § 922(g)

Henderson v. United States, 575 U.S. 622 (2015), was a United States Supreme Court case in which the Court held a court-ordered transfer of a felon's lawfully owned firearms from government custody to a third party is not barred by §922(g) if the court is satisfied that the recipient will not give the felon control over the firearms, so that he could either use them or direct their use.

== Background ==
Former United States Border Patrol agent Tony Henderson was arrested for distributing marijuana and as a condition of bail had to turn his nineteen firearms over to the federal government. After Henderson was convicted and could no longer legally possess firearms, he sought to have the government release them to a friend whom he was selling the weapons to, or in lieu of that, his wife, so she could make the transfer. The government refused, stating that this gave Henderson constructive possession and violated the law.

Henderson then asked for the District Court to order the release of the firearms and it denied his motion. The Eleventh Circuit affirmed, and Henderson appealed it to the Supreme Court.

== Opinion of the Court ==
Justice Elena Kagan delivered the opinion for a unanimous court. Kagan noted that federal courts have equitable authority to order a federal law enforcement agency to return property belonging to the owner or the owner's designee. She then noted that § 922(g) did not prohibit a felon from transferring a firearm and that this was separate from possessing the firearm. A court may seek assurances that the transferee will not allow the felon to regain possession of the firearms, but may not generally prohibit the owner from transferring the weapons to another person.
