= Teva Pharmaceuticals USA, Inc. v. Sandoz, Inc. =

- Supreme Court of the United States

Argued October 15, 2014 Decided January 20, 2015
- Full case name: Teva Pharmaceuticals USA, Inc. v. Sandoz, Inc.
- Docket no.: 13-854
- Citations: 574 U.S. 318 (more) 135 S. Ct. 831; 190 L. Ed. 2d 719; 2014 U.S. LEXIS 4897; 83 U.S.L.W. 4055; 113 U.S.P.Q.2d 1269

Case history
- Prior: 810 F. Supp. 2d 578 (S.D.N.Y. 2011); 876 F. Supp. 2d 295 (S.D.N.Y. 2012); affirmed in part, reversed in part, and remanded, 723 F.3d 1363 (Fed. Cir. 2013); stay denied, 572 U.S. 1301 (2014); cert. granted, 572 U.S. 1033 (2014)
- Subsequent: On remand, 789 F.3d 1335 (Fed. Cir. 2015)

Holding
- When reviewing a district court’s resolution of subsidiary factual matters made in the course of its construction of a patent claim, the Federal Circuit must apply a "clear error," not a de novo, standard of review.

Court membership
- Chief Justice John Roberts Associate Justices Antonin Scalia · Anthony Kennedy; Clarence Thomas · Ruth Bader Ginsburg; Stephen Breyer · Samuel Alito; Sonia Sotomayor · Elena Kagan

Case opinions
- Majority: Breyer, joined by Roberts, Scalia, Kennedy, Ginsburg, Sotomayor, Kagan
- Dissent: Thomas, joined by Alito

Laws applied
- F.R.C.P. 52(a)(6)

Teva Pharmaceuticals USA, Inc. v. Sandoz, Inc., 574 U.S. 318 (2015), is a patent case of the Supreme Court of the United States regarding the Copaxone patent. The Court held that, when reviewing a district court's resolution of subsidiary factual matters made in the course of its construction of a patent claim, the Federal Circuit must apply a "clear error," not a de novo, standard of review.

== Facts and procedural history ==
The case originated in the Southern District of New York, where Sandoz sued to invalidate Teva's patent on a drug for the treatment of multiple sclerosis. In the Markman hearing, Sandoz argued that a claim was fatally indefinite for failing to identify which of three possible meanings a particular claim term, related to the molecular weight of a component of the drug, should be interpreted to have. The district court judge held that the claim term was definite, and that a "person of ordinary skill in the art" would interpret the term "molecular weight" to mean the "peak average molecular weight", that is, the weight of the molecule most prevalent in the mixture. In doing so, the judge relied in part on expert witness testimony.

Sandoz appealed to the Federal Circuit, which reviewed the claim under a 'de novo' standard, decided that the claim term was fatally indefinite, and hence that the patent was invalid.

Teva appealed to the US Supreme Court and won.
