= Commil USA, LLC v. Cisco Systems, Inc. =

- Supreme Court of the United States

Argued March 31, 2015 Decided May 26, 2015
- Full case name: Commil USA, LLC v. Cisco Systems, Inc.
- Docket no.: 13-896
- Citations: 575 U.S. 632 (more) 135 S.Ct. 1920 (2015)
- Argument: Oral argument

Holding
- (1) A claim of induced infringement requires a showing that the defendant knew that it is engaging in infringing conduct. (2) A defendant's belief that a patent is invalid is not a defense to a claim of induced infringement.

Court membership
- Chief Justice John Roberts Associate Justices Antonin Scalia · Anthony Kennedy; Clarence Thomas · Ruth Bader Ginsburg; Stephen Breyer · Samuel Alito; Sonia Sotomayor · Elena Kagan

Case opinions
- Majority: Kennedy, joined by Thomas, Ginsburg, Alito, Sotomayor, Kagan
- Dissent: Scalia, joined by Roberts
- Breyer took no part in the consideration or decision of the case.

Laws applied
- 35 U.S.C. § 271

Commil USA, LLC v. Cisco Systems, Inc., 135 S.Ct. 1920 (2015), was a 2015 decision by the United States Supreme Court pertaining to the standard for induced patent infringement. Writing for a 6–2 majority, Justice Anthony Kennedy held that (1) a claim of induced infringement requires a showing that the defendant knew that it is engaging in infringing conduct and (2) a defendant's belief that a patent is invalid is not a defense to a claim of induced infringement. Justice Antonin Scalia dissented from the second point, arguing that, in his view, a good faith belief in a patent's invalidity should constitute a defense to a charge of induced infringement.

== Background ==
In 2002, the United States Patent and Trademark Office awarded U.S. Patent No. 6,430,395 ("the '395 patent") to Commil. The '395 patent claims as its invention an improved short-range wireless network that allows mobile devices to more quickly and efficiently move between various nodes in a network.

In 2007, Commil sued Cisco Systems in the United States District Court for the Eastern District of Texas alleging infringement of the '395 patent by Cisco's wireless access points and controllers. In 2010, the case was tried to a jury who found that Cisco did not induce others to infringe the '395 patent. The district court overturned this verdict due to certain improper comments made by Cisco's counsel during the trial and ordered a second jury trial. At the second trial, Cisco attempted to argue that it did not induce infringement of the '395 patent because it held a good faith belief that the '395 patent was invalid. However, the district court did not allow Cisco to make this argued and refused to provide Cisco's requested instruction to the jury. The jury at the second trial subsequently found that Cisco had, in fact, induced infringement of the '395 patent and ordered it to pay $63.8 million in damages.

Cisco appealed this verdict to the United States Court of Appeals for the Federal Circuit, arguing, among other things, that the district court was incorrect to refuse to instruct the jury on Cisco's good faith belief that the '395 patent was invalid. The Federal Circuit agreed with Cisco and reversed the jury verdict against it. Judge Pauline Newman of the Federal Circuit however criticized this ruling and argued that a good faith belief as to the invalidity of a patent was not a defense to induced infringement. Both parties subsequently appealed the Federal Circuit's opinion to the Supreme Court for further review.

== Supreme Court opinion ==
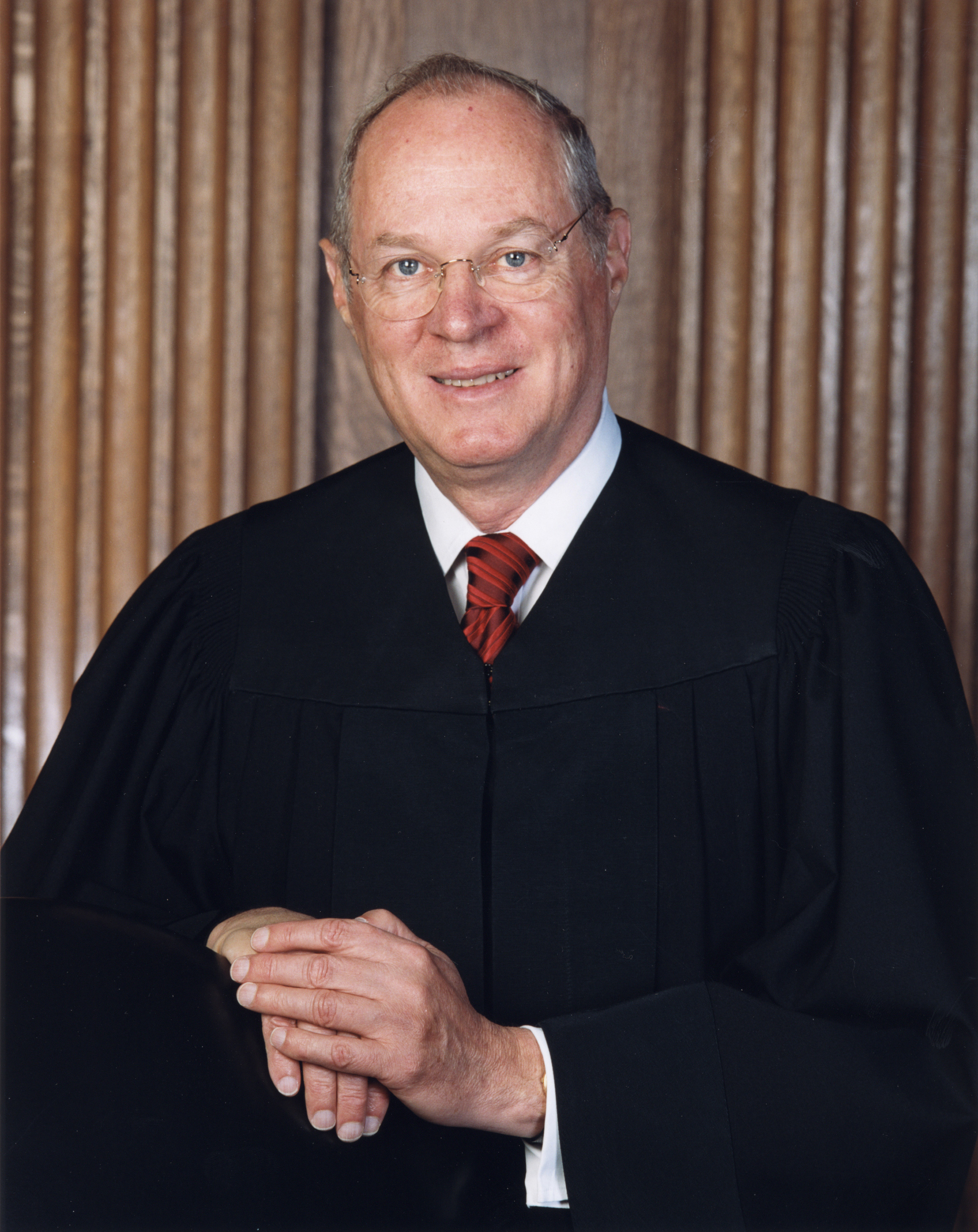
Justice Kennedy delivered the majority opinion for the Court.

The Supreme Court heard oral argument on March 31, 2015, and issued its opinion on May 26, 2015. Justice Kennedy, writing for a 6–2 majority, addressed two issues in the Court's opinion.

First, the Court clarified and reiterated its holding in Global-Tech v. SEB that, in making a claim for induced infringement, a plaintiff must show that the defendant knew, not only of the patent itself, but also knew that its actions constituted infringement of that patent. Second, the Court considered Cisco's claim that it held a good faith belief that the '395 patent was invalid and found that this assertion, even if true, did not constitute a defense to a claim of induced infringement. The Court's conclusion focused heavily on the distinction between infringement and invalidity, with Justice Kennedy noting that, while invalidity may be a defense to liability in a patent case, it is not separately a defense to a finding of infringement. The Court further considered that, under 35 U.S.C. § 282, a patent is presumed valid such that allowing a good faith belief of invalidity to act as a defense would undermine that presumption. Finally, the Court noted that to rule otherwise would encourage litigants to develop post-hac, litigation-driven invalidity theories solely to escape a finding of induced infringement. Finally, the Court, in a somewhat unusual fashion, devotes a final section of the opinion to a discussion of non-practicing entities, such as patent trolls, and notes that precluding this defense does not provide plaintiffs with free license to accuse companies of induced infringement and that defendants have many avenues with which to attack the validity of patents.

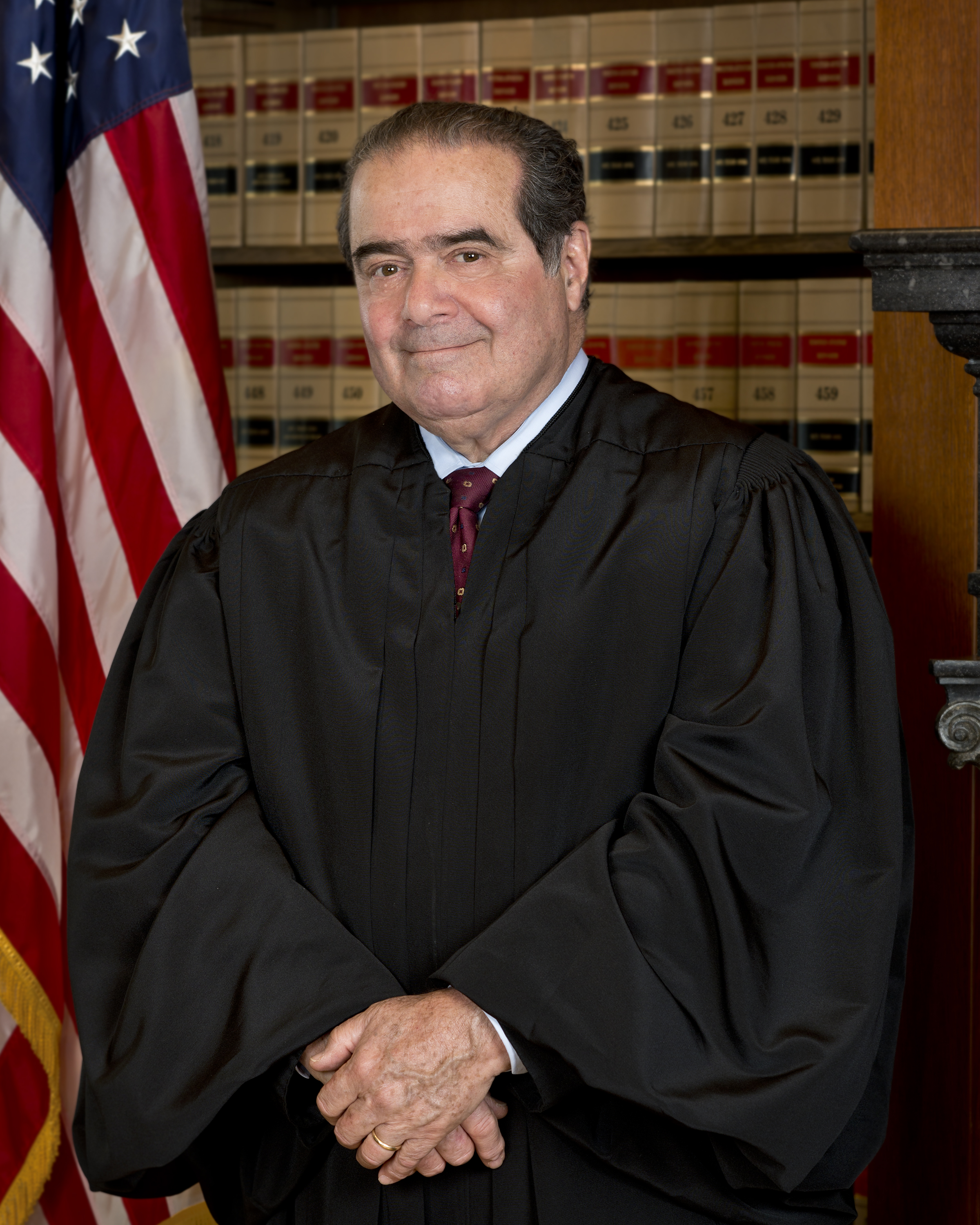
Justice Scalia, joined by Chief Justice Roberts, delivered a dissenting opinion.

Justice Scalia, joined by Chief Justice John Roberts, dissented from the Court's ruling. While Justice Roberts agreed with the Court's conclusion that inducement requires both knowledge of the patent and of the alleged infringement of that patent, he disagreed with the majority's holding that a good faith belief of invalidity could not act as a defense to a charge of inducement. While Justice Scalia acknowledged that infringement and invalidity are legally distinct concepts, he also noted that, as a practical matter, it was impossible to infringe an invalid patent.

== Reactions to the Supreme Court's decision ==
In the wake of the Supreme Court's decision, legal commentators believed that the decision would have a significant impact on how companies evaluated allegations of patent infringement. Ronald Mann of SCOTUSblog expressed surprise at the Court's ruling, noting that Commil had "managed to pull off a hard trick" by "getting a majority of the Justices to ignore the explicit language of an opinion so recent that all of those who signed it are still on the Court." As Mann saw it, the Court's ruling in Global-Tech v. SEB had implicitly suggested that a good faith belief of invalidity could serve as a defense such that the Court's new decision was a surprising reversal for defendants. Gene Quinn of IP Watchdog remarked that the decision was a "reasonable" one while criticizing several factual errors in the Court's opinion as demonstrating "how little the Supreme Court actually knows about patent law." Other commentators noted that the Court's ruling would likely reduce the number of pre-litigation opinion letters related to invalidity and that companies seeking to minimize infringement claims would be more likely to seek opinions regarding non-infringement.

== Subsequent proceedings ==
Following the Supreme Court's decision, the case was remanded to the Federal Circuit for consideration of how the case should proceed. On remand, the Federal Circuit held that neither Cisco nor its customers infringed the '395 patent and that judgment should be entered in Cisco's favor, thus wiping out the $63.8 million verdict entered by the jury.
