= United States v. Wrightwood Dairy Co. =

- Supreme Court of the United States

Argued January 14, 1942 Decided February 2, 1942
- Full case name: United States v. Wrightwood Dairy Co.
- Citations: 315 U.S. 110 (more) 62 S. Ct. 523; 86 L. Ed. 726; 1942 U.S. LEXIS 1164

Holding
- The Commerce Clause allows Congress to regulate the prices of intrastate goods if their sales would otherwise adversely affect a federal interstate price regulation

Court membership
- Chief Justice Harlan F. Stone Associate Justices Owen Roberts · Hugo Black; Stanley F. Reed · Felix Frankfurter; William O. Douglas · Frank Murphy; James F. Byrnes · Robert H. Jackson

Case opinion
- Majority: Stone, joined by a unanimous court
- Roberts took no part in the consideration or decision of the case.

Laws applied
- Commerce Clause; Agricultural Marketing Agreement Act of 1937

United States v. Wrightwood Dairy Co., 315 U.S. 110 (1942), was a major decision of the US Supreme Court upholding the Agricultural Marketing Agreement Act of 1937 as a valid use of Congress' authority under the Commerce Clause of the United States Constitution.

== Background ==
During the Great Depression, the federal government passed the Agricultural Marketing Agreement Act of 1937, which allowed the US Department of Agriculture (USDA) to issue marketing orders and agreements. Among other functions, these orders could set price floors requiring dairy milk processing companies to pay a government-designated minimum price to the farms producing raw milk.

The Wrightwood Dairy Company purchased raw milk from farms in the state of Illinois on a daily basis, transporting the milk for processing in its plant in Chicago, Illinois. The processed milk was only sold to customers within Illinois. However, the federal government claimed that Wrightwood Dairy was acting in competition to interstate businesses and should therefore be subject to its marketing orders and agreements. If allowed to continue purchasing raw milk from Illinois farms at less than the USDA's price floor, Wrightwood Dairy would be capable of selling its processed milk at prices lower than its competitors engaged in interstate business, thereby threatening the regulatory scheme.

In the 1939 case United States v. Rock Royal Co-op, the Supreme Court had included milk processed and sold entirely within the state of New York within the federal government's purview because the company used a mixture of raw milk from farms within and outside the state of New York.

== Supreme Court ruling ==
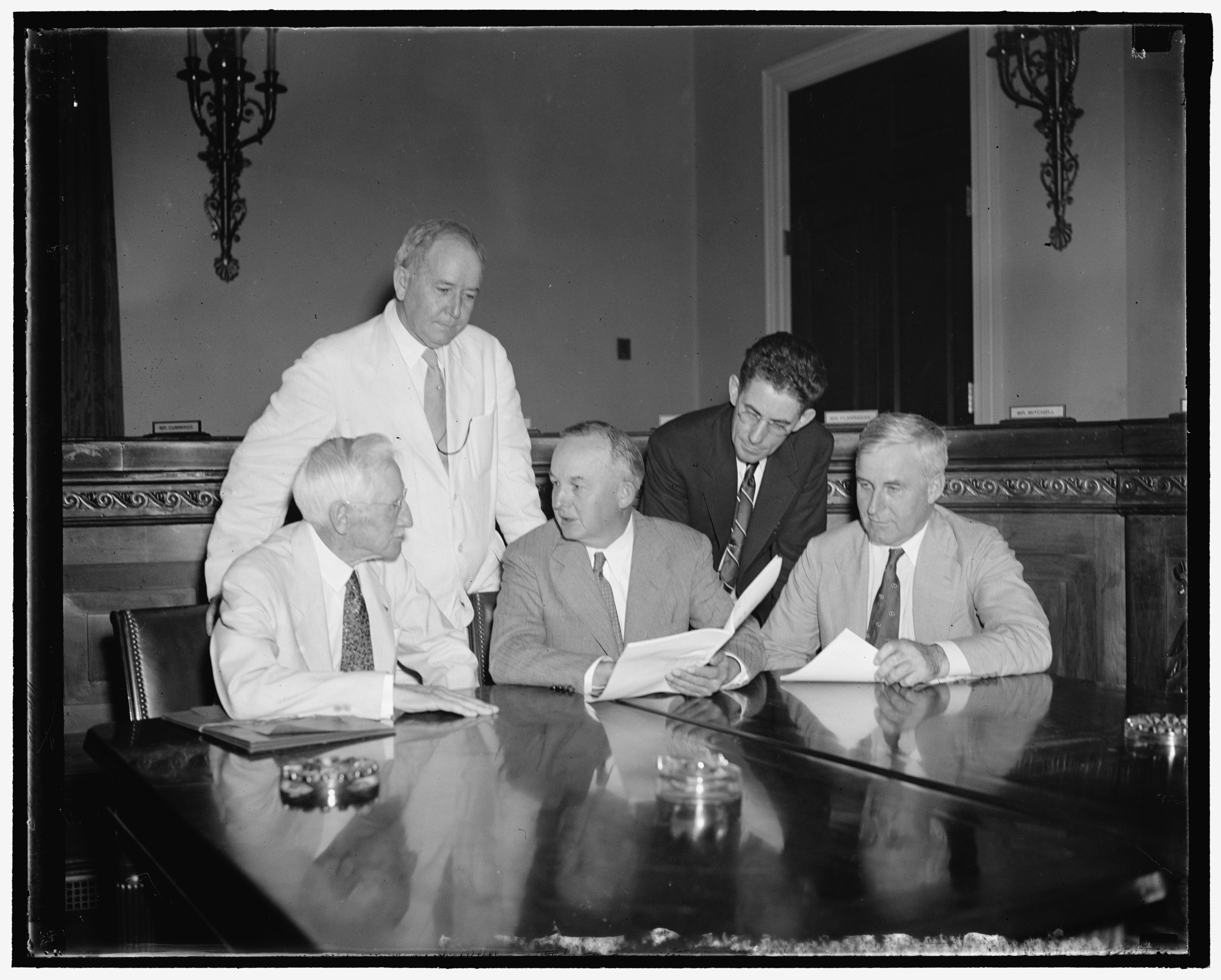
In 1937, the US House Committee on Agriculture passed the Agricultural Marketing Agreement Act to provide price regulations sought by agricultural lobbying groups.

In a unanimous ruling written by Chief Justice Harlan F. Stone, the Supreme Court ruled that Congress' authority to regulate interstate commerce under the Constitution's Commerce Clause allows it to regulate the prices of intrastate goods if their sales would otherwise adversely affect a federal interstate price regulation.

Wrightwood Dairy highlighted that whereas the 1933 Agricultural Adjustment Act regulated agricultural commodities "in the current of or in competition with [...] interstate or foreign commerce," the Agricultural Marketing Agreement Act of 1937 regulated "only such handling of such agricultural commodity, or product thereof, as is in the current of interstate or foreign commerce, or which directly burdens [...] such commodity or product thereof." However, the Supreme Court found that Congress only altered its phrasing to comply with the 1935 verdict in A.L.A. Schechter Poultry Corp. v. United States, which barred federal regulation on aspects of intrastate commerce that only indirectly affected interstate commerce.

The decision reversed the prior holdings of the US District Court for the Northern District of Illinois and Court of Appeals for the Seventh Circuit, remanding the case for further proceedings. The Michigan Law Review interpreted this decision as effectively reversing the Supreme Court's 1941 ruling in Federal Trade Commission v. Bunte Brothers, Inc., which had narrowly interpreted the Federal Trade Commission Act of 1914 as limiting the Federal Trade Commission's regulatory oversight to interstate businesses.

== See also ==
- Houston East & West Texas Railway Co. v. United States (Shreveport Rate Case)
- Commerce Clause
- List of United States Supreme Court cases, volume 315
