= Twenty-seventh Amendment to the United States Constitution =

1992 amendment delaying congressional salary changes

The Twenty-seventh Amendment (Amendment XXVII, also known as the Congressional Pay Amendment or the Congressional Compensation Act of 1789) to the United States Constitution states that any law that increases or decreases the salary of members of Congress may take effect only after the next election of the House of Representatives has occurred. It is the most recently adopted amendment but was one of the first proposed.

The 1st Congress submitted the amendment to the states for ratification on September 25, 1789, along with 11 other proposed amendments (Articles I–XII). The last ten Articles were ratified in 1791 to become the Bill of Rights, but the first two, the Twenty-seventh Amendment and the proposed Congressional Apportionment Amendment, were not ratified by enough states to come into force with them.

The proposed congressional pay amendment was largely forgotten until 1982, when Gregory Watson, a 19-year-old student at the University of Texas at Austin, wrote a paper for a government class in which he claimed that the amendment could still be ratified. He later launched a nationwide campaign to complete its ratification. The amendment eventually became part of the United States Constitution, effective May 5, 1992.

The idea behind this amendment is to reduce corruption in the legislative branch by requiring an election before a congressperson's salary increase takes effect. The public can thus remove members of Congress from office before their salaries increase. It is unclear whether the amendment has produced any change in congressional behavior. An unintended consequence of the amendment is that, unlike executive branch employees or Congressional staff, all members of Congress continue to get paid during a shutdown. The interpretation of a cease in pay for cease of work as a decrease in salary, which is prohibited by the amendment, has not been ruled upon.

== Text ==
No law, varying the compensation for the services of the Senators and Representatives, shall take effect, until an election of Representatives shall have intervened.

The Twenty-seventh Amendment from the hand-written copy of the proposed Bill of Rights, 1789

== Historical background ==
Several states raised the issue of Congressional salaries as they debated whether to ratify the Constitution.

North Carolina's ratifying convention proposed several amendments to the Constitution, including the following: "The laws ascertaining the compensation of senators and representatives, for their services, shall be postponed in their operation until after the election of representatives immediately succeeding the passing thereof; that excepted which shall first be passed on the subject." Virginia's ratifying convention recommended an identical amendment.

New York's declaration of ratification was accompanied by a similar amendment proposal: "That the Compensation for the Senators and Representatives be ascertained by standing law; and that no alteration of the existing rate of Compensation shall operate for the Benefit of the Representatives, until after a subsequent Election shall have been had."

=== Proposal by Congress ===
This amendment was one of several proposed amendments to the Constitution that Representative James Madison of Virginia introduced in the House of Representatives on June 8, 1789. Madison's original intent was that it be added to the end of Article I, Section 6, Clause 1 of the Constitution ("The Senators and Representatives shall receive a Compensation for their Services, to be ascertained by Law, and paid out of the Treasury of the United States"). This and Madison's other proposals were referred to a committee consisting of one representative from each state. After emerging from committee, the full House debated the issue and, on August 24, 1789, passed it and 16 other articles of amendment. Next, the proposals went to the Senate, which made 26 substantive alterations. On September 9, 1789, the Senate approved a culled and consolidated package of 12 articles of amendment.

On September 21, 1789, a House–Senate conference committee convened to resolve numerous differences between the House and Senate Bill of Rights proposals. On September 24, 1789, the committee issued its report, which finalized 12 proposed amendments for the House and Senate to consider. The House agreed to the conference report that day, and the Senate concurred the next day.

What would become the Twenty-seventh Amendment was listed second among the 12 proposals sent on September 25, 1789, to the states for their consideration. Ten of these, numbers 3–12, were ratified 27 months later and are known as the Bill of Rights. The remaining proposal, the Congressional Apportionment Amendment, has not been ratified by enough states to become part of the Constitution.

The article on Congressional compensation was initially ratified by seven states through 1792 (including Kentucky), but was not ratified by another state for eighty years. The Ohio General Assembly ratified it on May 6, 1873, in protest of an unpopular Congressional pay raise. A century later, on March 6, 1978, the Wyoming Legislature also ratified the article.

=== Revival of interest ===
External videos
- Q&A interview with Gregory Watson, July 15, 2018, C-SPAN

This proposed amendment was largely forgotten until Gregory Watson, an undergraduate student at the University of Texas at Austin, wrote a paper on the subject in 1982 for a political science course. In the paper, Watson argued that the amendment was still "live" and could be ratified. Watson received a "C" grade for his paper from one of the course's teaching assistants. Watson appealed the grade to the course instructor, Sharon Waite, who declined to overrule the teaching assistant. Waite has said, "I kind of glanced at it, but I didn't see anything that was particularly outstanding about it and I thought the C was probably fine". Watson responded by starting a new push for ratification with a letter-writing campaign to state legislatures.

In Dillon v. Gloss, the Supreme Court wrote, "ratification [of a proposed constitutional amendment] must be within some reasonable time after the proposal", and suggested that it was "quite untenable" to view proposed amendments from 1789, 1810, and 1861 as still pending. But in Coleman v. Miller, the court ruled that the validity of state ratifications of a constitutional amendment is a political matter, and thus not properly assigned to the judiciary. It also held that for a political question, it was up to Congress to determine whether an amendment with no time limit for ratification is still viable after a long time, based on "the political, social and economic conditions which have prevailed during the period since the submission of the amendment".

Watson used $6,000 of his own money to sponsor his nationwide effort. When Watson began his campaign in early 1982, he was aware of ratification by only six states, and erroneously believed that Virginia's 1791 approval was the last action a state had taken. He discovered in 1983 that Ohio had approved the amendment in 1873 as a means of protest against the Salary Grab Act and learned in 1984 that Wyoming had done the same in 1978, as a protest against a 1977 congressional pay raise. Watson also did not know until 1997, well after the amendment's adoption, that Kentucky had ratified the amendment in 1792. Neither did Kentucky lawmakers themselves – in Watson's desire for a 50-state sweep, the Kentucky General Assembly post-ratified the amendment in 1996 (Senate Joint Resolution No. 50), at Watson's request, likewise unaware that the task had already been attended to 204 years earlier.

In April 1983, Maine became the first state to ratify the amendment as a result of Watson's campaign, followed by Colorado in April 1984. Numerous state legislatures followed suit, with some reaffirming the amendment despite having affirmed it centuries ago. Michigan and New Jersey rushed to be the 38th state to ratify the amendment, but Michigan was faster, ratifying the amendment on May 7, 1992, resulting in the certification of the amendment. New Jersey ratified the amendment regardless, overturning its rejection of the amendment centuries earlier.

In 2016, Zach Elkins, a professor in the University of Texas at Austin Department of Government, became interested in Watson's story and began to document its origins. He tracked down Sharon Waite, who had left academia in the 1980s to work on her family's citrus farm. Elkins suggested to Waite that they change Watson's grade. In 2017, Elkins submitted a grade change form with Waite's signature and a grade change to A+. In an interview, Waite said, "Goodness, he certainly proved he knew how to work the Constitution and what it meant and how to be politically active, [...] So, yes, I think he deserves an A after that effort – A-plus!" A+ is not a valid grade at UT, so Watson's grade may have been changed to an A, though Elkins urged the registrar to leave it as the only A+ ever recorded at the University of Texas. In the same year, the Texas Legislature passed a congratulatory resolution in response to Watson's successful grade change and his overall political participation.

== Ratification by the states ==
Ratified amendment, 1789–1792 Ratified amendment, 1873–1978 Ratified amendment, 1983–1991 Ratified amendment, May 1992^{1} Ratified post-enactment, 1992–present Ratified twice (NC: 1789 and 1989; KY: 1792 and 1996) Have not ratified amendment^{1}The Archivist did not certify the amendment until May 18, 1992, with 40 states listed as ratifying the amendment. Kentucky's then-unknown 1792 ratification would have made it 41 states that had ratified at the time of certification, three more than the 38 required for a three-quarters majority.

The following states ratified the Twenty-seventh Amendment:

1. Maryland – December 19, 1789
2. North Carolina – December 22, 1789 (Reaffirmed on July 4, 1989)
3. South Carolina – January 19, 1790
4. Delaware – January 28, 1790
5. Vermont – November 3, 1791
6. Virginia – December 15, 1791
7. Kentucky – June 27, 1792 (Reaffirmed on March 21, 1996)
8. Ohio – May 6, 1873
9. Wyoming – March 6, 1978
10. Maine – April 27, 1983
11. Colorado – April 22, 1984
12. South Dakota – February 21, 1985
13. New Hampshire – March 7, 1985 (After rejection on January 26, 1790)
14. Arizona – April 3, 1985
15. Tennessee – May 28, 1985
16. Oklahoma – July 1, 1985
17. New Mexico – February 14, 1986
18. Indiana – February 24, 1986
19. Utah – February 25, 1986
20. Arkansas – March 13, 1987
21. Montana – March 17, 1987
22. Connecticut – May 13, 1987
23. Wisconsin – July 15, 1987
24. Georgia – February 2, 1988
25. West Virginia – March 10, 1988
26. Louisiana – July 7, 1988
27. Iowa – February 9, 1989
28. Idaho – March 23, 1989
29. Nevada – April 26, 1989
30. Alaska – May 6, 1989
31. Oregon – May 19, 1989
32. Minnesota – May 22, 1989
33. Texas – May 25, 1989
34. Kansas – April 5, 1990
35. Florida – May 31, 1990
36. North Dakota – March 25, 1991
37. Missouri – May 5, 1992
38. Alabama – May 5, 1992
39. Michigan – May 7, 1992

On May 18, 1992, the Archivist of the United States, Don W. Wilson, certified that the amendment's ratification had been completed. Michigan's May 7, 1992, ratification was believed to be the 38th state, but it later came to light that the Kentucky General Assembly had ratified the amendment during that state's initial month of statehood, making Alabama (which acted after Missouri on May 5, 1992) the state to finalize the amendment's addition to the Constitution.

The amendment was subsequently ratified by:

40. New Jersey – May 7, 1992 (After rejection on November 20, 1789)
41. Illinois – May 12, 1992
42. California – June 26, 1992
43. Rhode Island – June 10, 1993 (After rejection on June 7, 1790)
44. Hawaii – April 29, 1994
45. Washington – April 6, 1995
46. Nebraska – April 1, 2016

Four states have not ratified the Twenty-seventh Amendment: Massachusetts, Mississippi, New York, and Pennsylvania.

=== Affirmation of ratification ===
On May 19, 1992, the Twenty-seventh Amendment's certificate of ratification, signed by the Archivist of the United States, Don W. Wilson, on May 18, 1992, was printed and published in the Federal Register.

In certifying that the amendment had been duly ratified, the Archivist of the United States had acted under statutory authority granted to his office by the Congress under 1 U.S.C. § 106b, which states:

Whenever official notice is received at the National Archives and Records Administration that any amendment proposed to the Constitution of the United States has been adopted, according to the provisions of the Constitution, the Archivist of the United States shall forthwith cause the amendment to be published, with his certificate, specifying the States by which the same may have been adopted, and that the same has become valid, to all intents and purposes, as a part of the Constitution of the United States.

The response in Congress was sharp. Senator Robert Byrd of West Virginia scolded Wilson for certifying the amendment without congressional approval. Although Byrd supported congressional acceptance of the amendment, he contended that Wilson had deviated from "historic tradition" by not waiting for Congress to consider the ratification's validity, given the extremely long time since the amendment had been proposed. Speaker of the House Tom Foley and others called for a legal challenge to the ratification.

On May 20, 1992, under the authority recognized in Coleman, and in keeping with the precedent established by the ratification of the Fourteenth Amendment, each house of the 102nd Congress passed its own version of a concurrent resolution agreeing that the amendment was validly ratified, despite the more than 202 years the task took. The Senate's approval of the resolution was unanimous (99 to 0) and the House vote was 414 to 3.

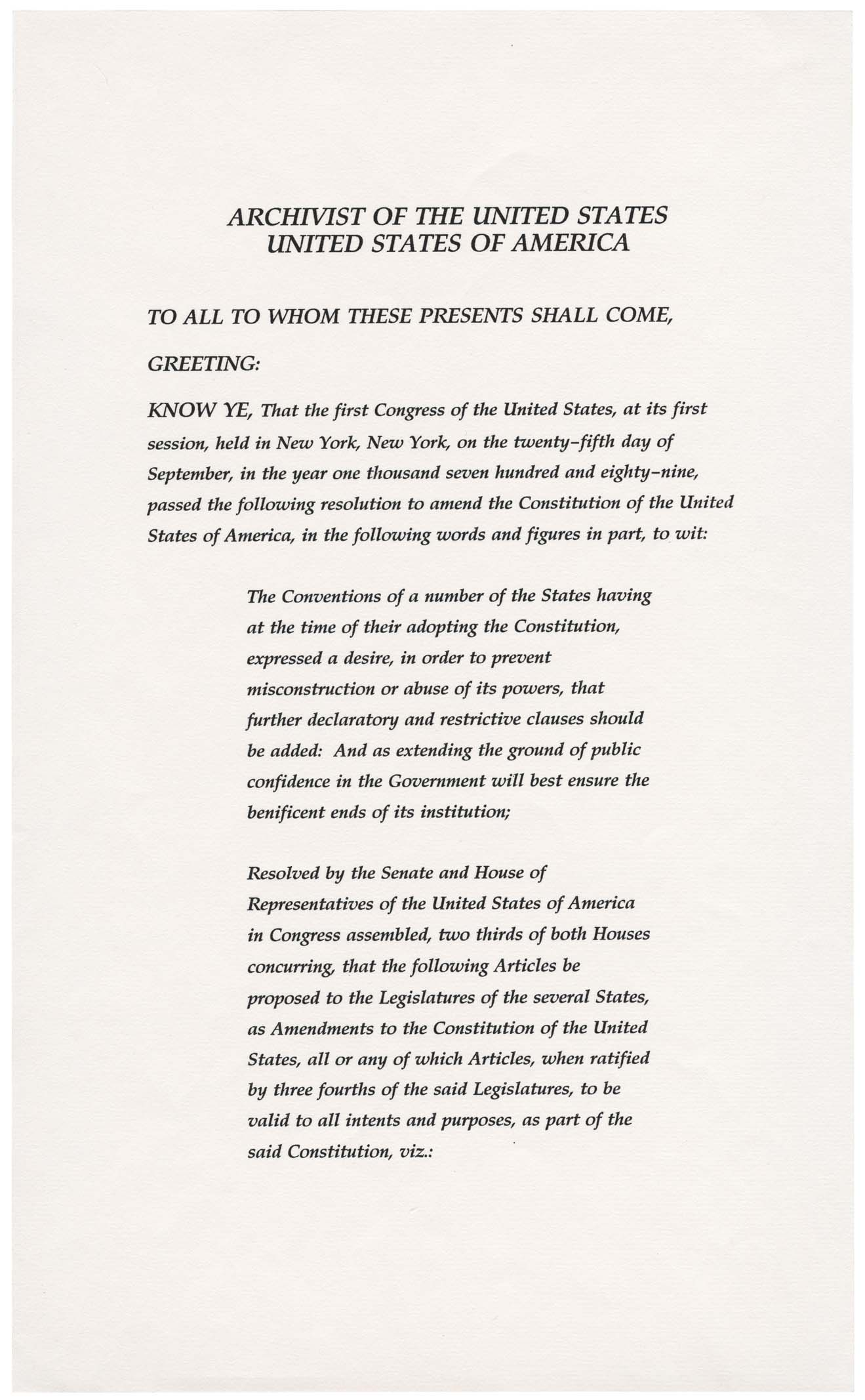
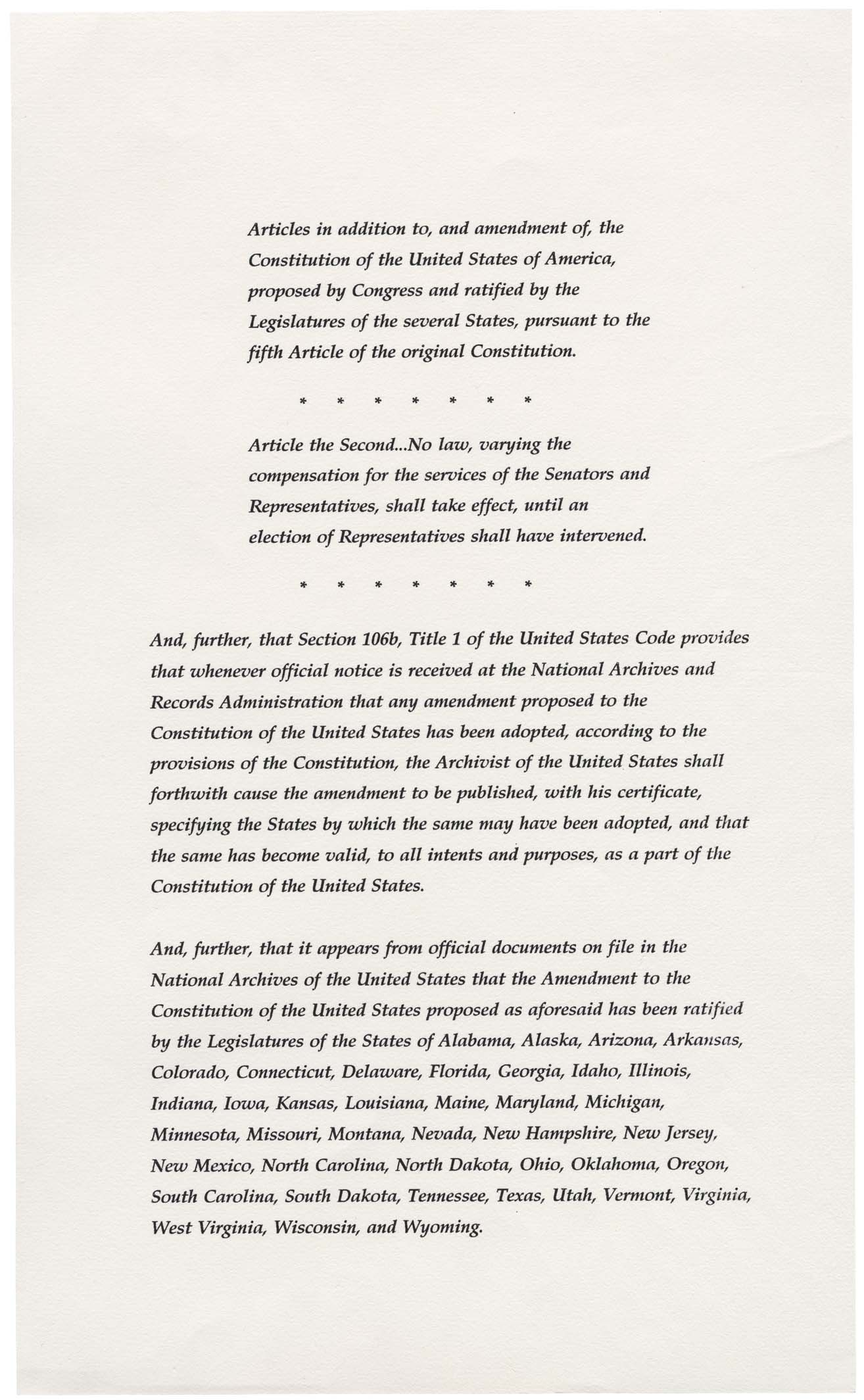
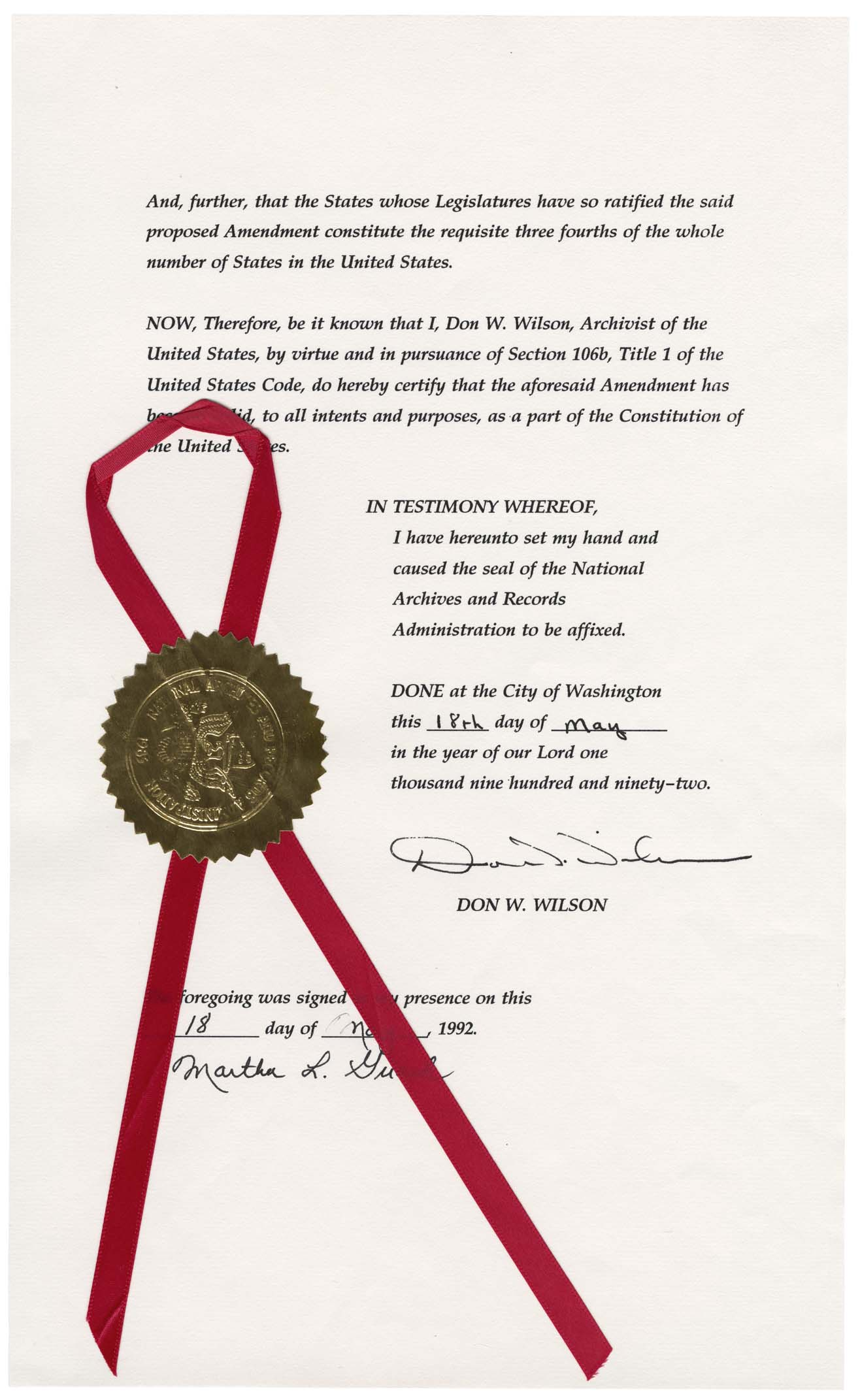
The Twenty-seventh Amendment's certification, National Archives

== Legal issues ==
=== Cost-of-living adjustments ===
Congressional cost-of-living adjustments (COLA) have been upheld against legal challenges based on this amendment. In Boehner v. Anderson, the United States Court of Appeals for the District of Columbia Circuit ruled that the first COLA was in accord with the amendment because it took effect after the election that followed its vote. The court declined to rule on the constitutionality of COLAs in general. In Schaffer v. Clinton, the United States Court of Appeals for the Tenth Circuit ruled (explicitly disagreeing with Boehner) that receiving such a COLA does not grant members of the Congress standing in federal court to challenge it; the Supreme Court did not hear either case, and so has never ruled on this amendment's effect on COLAs. In May 2026, Federal Claims Judge Eric G. Bruggink ruled the amendment "applies to laws decreasing Congressional compensation" and COLAs.

=== No Budget, No Pay Act ===
The No Budget, No Pay Act was proposed in 2012 and again in 2013 to prevent lawmakers from being paid during a government shutdown. The bill received limited bipartisan support, but concerns were raised that it violated the twenty-seventh amendment saying that Congress may not "vary" the compensation of its members until the next election. The bill did not pass and the Supreme Court has not addressed its constitutionality.

== See also ==
- List of amendments to the Constitution of the United States
- List of proposed amendments to the Constitution of the United States
- United States Bill of Rights
