= Fluid differential =

In United States federal milk marketing orders, the fluid differential (or Class I differential) is the amount added to the base price of milk to determine a region’s minimum price for milk used for fluid (drinking) purposes.
