= Agricultural Marketing Agreement Act of 1937 =

- Long title: An Act to reenact and amend provisions of the Agricultural Adjustment Act, as amended, relating to marketing agreements and orders.
- Enacted by: the 75th United States Congress
- Effective: June 3, 1937

Citations
- Public law: Pub. L. 75–137
- Statutes at Large: 50 Stat. 246

Codification
- Titles amended: 7 U.S.C.: Agriculture

Legislative history
- Signed into law by President Franklin D. Roosevelt on June 3, 1937

United States Supreme Court cases
- United States v. Wrightwood Dairy Co., 315 U.S. 110 (1942); Horne v. Department of Agriculture, 576 U.S. 351 (2015)

The Agricultural Marketing Agreement Act of 1937 provides authority for federal marketing orders, and also reaffirmed the marketing agreements provisions of the Agricultural Adjustment Act of 1933.

Under the authority of this permanent law and subsequent amendments, marketing orders have been established for milk as well as numerous fruits, vegetables, and specialty crops.

The Agricultural Marketing Agreement of 1937 created the Raisin Administrative Committee, which was the subject of the 2013 and 2015 Supreme Court case Horne v. Department of Agriculture.

== See also ==
- Marketing agreements
- Marketing orders and agreements
- Agricultural Adjustment Act of 1938
- Agricultural Marketing Service
