= Flow to market =

US agricultural concept

In United States agriculture, flow to market is a quantity provision in a fruit or vegetable marketing order that does not change the total quantity that can be marketed during a season, but rather controls the rate or time period that quantities can be shipped to markets by means of shipping holidays and prorates.
