= Perkins v. Elg =

- Supreme Court of the United States

Argued February 3, 1939 Decided May 29, 1939
- Full case name: Perkins v. Elg
- Citations: 307 U.S. 325 (more) 59 S. Ct. 884; 83 L. Ed. 1320; 1939 U.S. LEXIS 514

Case history
- Prior: 99 F.2d 408 (D.C. Cir. 1938); cert. granted, 305 U.S. 591 (1938).

Holding
- A child born in the United States to naturalized parents and raised abroad retains U.S. citizenship until the age of majority, and at that point continues to retain U.S. citizenship if he or she elects to retain it, and elects to return to the United States and assume the duties of a U.S. citizen.

Court membership
- Chief Justice Charles E. Hughes Associate Justices James C. McReynolds · Pierce Butler; Harlan F. Stone · Owen Roberts; Hugo Black · Stanley F. Reed; Felix Frankfurter · William O. Douglas

Case opinion
- Majority: Hughes, joined by Butler, Stone, Roberts, Black, Reed, Frankfurter, McReynolds
- Douglas took no part in the consideration or decision of the case.

Laws applied
- Civil Rights Act of 1866, Naturalization Convention and Protocol of 1869

Perkins v. Elg, 307 U.S. 325 (1939), was a decision by the Supreme Court of the United States that a child born in the United States to naturalized parents on U.S. soil is a natural born citizen and that the child's natural born citizenship is not lost if the child is taken to and raised in the country of the parents' origin, provided that upon attaining the age of majority, the child elects to retain U.S. citizenship "and to return to the United States to assume its duties."

== Background ==
Marie Elizabeth Elg was born in the Brooklyn section of New York City in 1907 to two Swedish parents who had arrived in the United States some time prior to 1906; her father was naturalized in 1906. In 1911, her mother took the four-year-old to Sweden; her father went to Sweden in 1922, and in 1934 made a statement before an American consul in Sweden that he had "voluntarily expatriated himself for the reason that he did not desire to retain the status of an American citizen and wished to preserve his allegiance to Sweden."

In 1929, within eight months of attaining the age of majority, Marie Elg obtained an American passport through the American consul in Sweden, and returned to the United States. In 1935 she was notified by the U.S. Department of Labor that she was an illegal alien and was threatened with deportation.

Elg sued to establish that she was a citizen of the United States and not subject to deportation. Frances Perkins was listed as the nominal plaintiff in the case, being the Secretary of Labor during the administration of Franklin D. Roosevelt, when the case was appealed to the Supreme Court.

== Decision ==
Chief Justice Hughes wrote for the Court:

- Elg became a citizen of the United States upon her birth in New York; the Civil Rights Act of 1866 had specifically addressed the issue of a child born in the United States to alien parents;
- When a citizen of the United States who is a minor has parents who renounce their American citizenship, the minor does not lose his American citizenship as a result, "provided that, on attaining majority he elects to retain that citizenship and to return to the United States to assume its duties";
- Some provisions of the Naturalization Convention and Protocol of 1869 between the U.S. and Sweden, which provided for the loss of U.S. citizenship by any United States citizen who chose to "expatriate" — to become a naturalized citizen of another country, live there, and lose their United States citizenship — did not apply to minors, as the minor's move out of the United States was not to be considered a voluntary act;
- The acquisition of "derivative Swedish citizenship" by a minor likewise does not force the minor to lose his American citizenship.

The Court's first holding, that Elg was a citizen upon birth within the United States, was a reaffirmation of United States v. Wong Kim Ark (1898).

The case was argued for the United States by Robert H. Jackson, who later became a Supreme Court justice. This was the only Supreme Court case that Jackson lost in his two years as Solicitor General.

The case was called in 1960 a "landmark decision on expatriation".

== See also ==
- Sweden v. Yamaguchi: A court case involving Sweden and American-occupied Japan
- List of United States Supreme Court cases, volume 307
