= National Raisin Reserve =

U.S. raisin reserve, 1949–2015

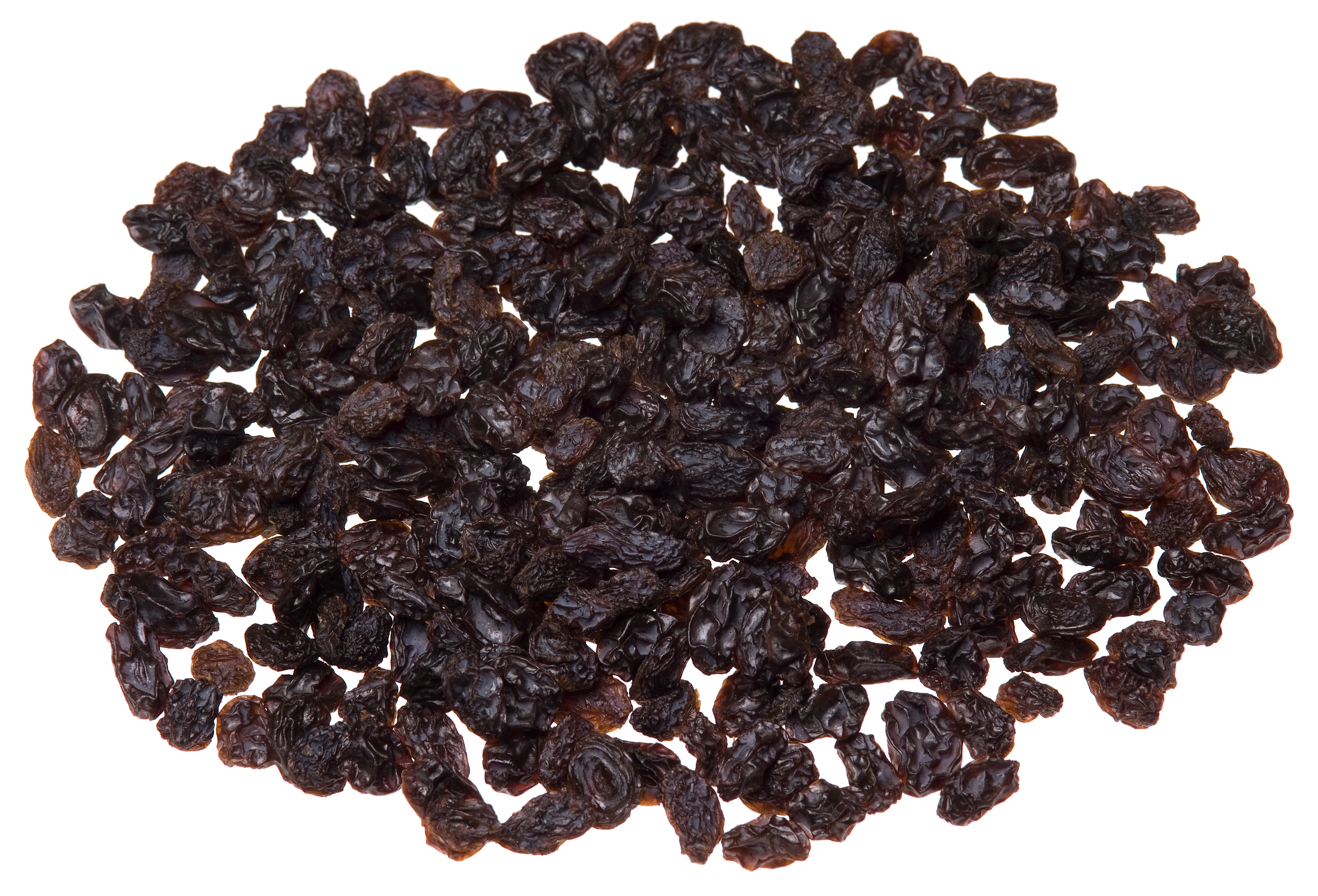

The National Raisin Reserve was a raisin reserve of the United States. It was created after World War II by the government in order to control raisin prices. The reserve was run by the Raisin Administrative Committee. It was enforced by means of a "marketing order". In 2015, the United States Supreme Court ruled in Horne v. Department of Agriculture that the confiscation of a portion of a farmer's crops without market price compensation was unconstitutional and ended the reserve.

== History ==
The reserve was founded in 1949 as a means to prevent the crash of raisin prices in post-World War II America. Because there was less demand from the federal government for raisins, there was suddenly a glut of raisins on the market. As a result, prices began to go down. In 1949, Marketing Order 989 was passed which created the reserve and the Raisin Administrative Committee, which was responsible for running the reserve. Once established, the reserve functioned as a government-mandated cartel, artificially limiting the raisin supply in order to drive up prices, for the collective benefit of raisin growers.

American raisins, once seized, were sent to various warehouses across California, to be stored until sold to foreign nations, fed to cattle or schoolchildren, or disposed of in any other way to get them off the market that year.

The Raisin Administrative Committee was based in Fresno, California, and was overseen by the United States Department of Agriculture. The committee was made up of industry representatives, who would decide each year on the size of the reserve and what to do with the stockpiled supply. The profits from the sale of the reserved raisins (taken from growers often for no payment) were used to pay the expenses of the committee or pay farmers for their seized produce. In one recent year, $65,483,211 was seized; it was all spent, with nothing left over for farmers.

Regarding the National Raisin Reserve, Daniel Sumner, director of the University of California’s Agricultural Issues Center stated "It’s a cartel. Let’s use the power of the government to operate a cartel...", "Congress had given the USDA the authority to operate reserves during the New Deal: Other reserves existed for almonds, walnuts, tart cherries and other products."

In 2013, Florida Congressman Trey Radel introduced a bill that would repeal Marketing Order 989. The bill was introduced but not enacted.

== Supreme Court case ==
The reserve gained prominence in 2013 when Marvin Horne challenged the legitimacy of the reserve in Horne v. Department of Agriculture. Horne's takings claim made its way all the way to the United States Supreme Court, which reversed and remanded the determination of the U.S. Court of Appeals for the Ninth Circuit that it had no jurisdiction. On remand, the Ninth Circuit found that the reserve's requirements did not constitute a taking. In April 2015, the case was argued again before the Supreme Court, which decided in June 2015, by a majority of 5–4, that the confiscation of a portion of a farmer's crops without market price compensation was unconstitutional. The Court found no reason to remand the case, stating "[t]his case, in litigation for more than a decade, has gone on long enough." This ended the raisin reserve.

== Other reserves ==
In addition to the National Raisin Reserve, during the New Deal other reserves existed for almonds, walnuts, tart cherries and other products. Enacted during the Great Depression, the New Deal reserves were a result of the government's attempt to keep prices viable for farmers to grow the fruit and make a suitable profit. Most of these no longer exist.

== See also ==
- Agricultural Marketing Agreement Act of 1937
- Marketing orders and agreements
- Price controls
