= Horne v. Department of Agriculture =

Horne v. Department of Agriculture I
- Supreme Court of the United States

Argued March 20, 2013 Decided June 10, 2013
- Full case name: Marvin D. Horne, et al. v. Department of Agriculture
- Docket no.: 12-123
- Citations: 569 U.S. 513 (more) 133 S. Ct. 2053; 186 L. Ed. 2d 69; 2013 U.S. LEXIS 4357; 81 U.S.L.W. 4367 (2013)
- Argument: Oral argument
- Opinion announcement: Opinion announcement

Case history
- Prior: Summary judgment for defendants, No. 1:08-cv-01549, 2009 WL 4895362, 2009 U.S. Dist. LEXIS 115464 (E.D. Cal. Dec. 11, 2009), aff'd, lack of jurisdiction found, 673 F.3d 1071 (9th Cir. 2012).
- Subsequent: No takings, 750 F.3d 1128 (9th Cir. 2014), rev'd, 576 U.S. 351 (2015) ("Horne II")

Holding
- A farmer who is deemed to have violated an agricultural marketing order and seeks to argue that a fine assessed against them for this violation is an unconstitutional taking can bring the takings claim in a regular federal district court before paying the fine and is not required to bring that claim in the Court of Federal Claims.

Court membership
- Chief Justice John Roberts Associate Justices Antonin Scalia · Anthony Kennedy; Clarence Thomas · Ruth Bader Ginsburg; Stephen Breyer · Samuel Alito; Sonia Sotomayor · Elena Kagan

Case opinion
- Majority: Thomas, joined by unanimous

Laws applied
- U.S. Const. amend. V.; Agricultural Marketing Agreement Act of 1937; Tucker Act

Horne v. Department of Agriculture II
- Supreme Court of the United States

Argued April 22, 2015 Decided June 22, 2015
- Full case name: Marvin D. Horne, et al. v. Department of Agriculture
- Docket no.: 14-275
- Citations: 576 U.S. 351 (more) 135 S. Ct. 2419; 192 L. Ed. 2d 388; 83 U.S.L.W. 4503
- Argument: Oral argument
- Opinion announcement: Opinion announcement
- Decision: Opinion

Holding
- The Fifth Amendment requires that the Government pay just compensation when it takes personal property, just as when it takes real property

Court membership
- Chief Justice John Roberts Associate Justices Antonin Scalia · Anthony Kennedy; Clarence Thomas · Ruth Bader Ginsburg; Stephen Breyer · Samuel Alito; Sonia Sotomayor · Elena Kagan

Case opinions
- Majority: Roberts, joined by Scalia, Kennedy, Thomas, Alito; Ginsburg, Breyer, Kagan (Parts I and II)
- Concurrence: Thomas
- Concur/dissent: Breyer, joined by Ginsburg, Kagan
- Dissent: Sotomayor

Laws applied
- U.S. Const. amend. V.; Agricultural Marketing Agreement Act of 1937; Tucker Act

Horne v. Department of Agriculture, 569 U.S. 513 (2013) ("Horne I"); 576 U.S. 351 (2015) ("Horne II"), is a case in which the United States Supreme Court issued two decisions regarding the Takings Clause of the Fifth Amendment to the United States Constitution. The case arose out of a dispute involving the National Raisin Reserve, when a farmer challenged a rule that required farmers to keep a portion of their crops off the market. In Horne I, the Court held that the plaintiff had standing to sue for violation of the United States Constitution’s Takings Clause. In Horne II, the Court held that the National Raisin Reserve was an unconstitutional violation of the Takings Clause.

== Background ==
=== National Raisin Reserve ===
During the Great Depression, raisin prices dropped over 80%. Congress reacted by passing the Agricultural Marketing Agreement Act of 1937 (AMAA). The AMAA allowed the United States Department of Agriculture (USDA) to issue marketing orders and agreements holding a portion of harvests in reserve so as to inflate prices. Authority to determine the annual portion of "reserve tonnage" raisins that were held by the government and the "free tonnage" raisins that owners may sell on the open market was delegated by the USDA to the Raisin Administrative Committee, a body composed of raisin industry representatives appointed by the Secretary of Agriculture. The raisin reserve regularly collected as much as half of raisins grown, with the raisin reserve being over 30% of total raisins for five out of the ten years between 1997 and 2006. The Raisin Committee then sold the reserve raisins on noncompetitive markets for a variety of public purposes, such as increasing exports, rewarding favored foreign governments, feeding schoolchildren, or even giving them back to growers if the latter agreed to cut back their production. Sale proceeds that remained after funding Raisin Committee operations and subsidizing exporters were returned to the owner of the raisins. That amount was sometimes zero.

=== Initial dispute with Raisin Administrative Committee ===
Marvin Horne, a raisin grower operating outside Kerman, California, did not want to give any of his raisins to the Raisin Committee. Because the raisin reserve was not collected from growers but from raisin handlers who sold raisins directly to buyers, Horne restructured his farm to act as both a grower and a handler. He then contended that the reserve requirement no longer applied to him. However, the Raisin Committee disagreed. When the Committee sent its trucks to collect Horne's raisins, Horne refused to allow them onto his property. The Committee then fined Horne $680,000, the value of the raisins plus a penalty. Horne then filed suit in federal court, complaining that the raisin reserve violated the U.S. Constitution. Unconvinced, United States District Court for the Eastern District of California Judge Lawrence Joseph O'Neill granted summary judgment to the USDA. Horne appealed, but a panel of the Ninth Circuit Court of Appeals affirmed, finding that the district court did not even have jurisdiction to hear the constitutional claim. Horne petitioned the United States Supreme Court for a writ of certiorari, which was granted. Former Tenth Circuit Court of Appeals judge and Stanford Law School professor Michael McConnell argued before the Court on behalf of Horne.

== Horne I ==
In a unanimous opinion written by Justice Clarence Thomas, the Court held that the Ninth Circuit had jurisdiction to consider Horne's case. The Court first ruled that Horne's attempt to avoid the AMAA by restructuring his farm as a combined raisin grower and handler was ineffective. However, because the law applied to Horne, his challenge to the raisin reserve was ripe. Justice Thomas also concluded that the Tucker Act did not require Horne to sue in the Court of Federal Claims because the AMAA had a comprehensive regulatory scheme. Consequently, Justice Thomas held that the case should be remanded to the Ninth Circuit to consider the merits of Horne's takings claim.

== Horne II ==
On remand, the same panel of the Ninth Circuit found that there had been no taking because the Takings Clause protects personal property, like raisins, less than real property. Again, Horne petitioned for a writ of certiorari and, again, the petition was granted. Stanford Law School professor Michael McConnell returned to argue the case for Horne, while Deputy U.S. Solicitor General Edwin Kneedler argued for the Government.

=== Roberts' majority opinion ===
Writing for a majority of the Court, Chief Justice John Roberts held that the Fifth Amendment requires the government and its agencies to pay just compensation when they take personal property from citizens. Roberts began his analysis by tracing the history of personal property from the protection of farmers’ grain in the 1215 Magna Carta, to the 1641 Massachusetts Body of Liberties, to a 1778 editorial by John Jay. Roberts concluded that personal property has not been given any less protection than real property for at least 800 years and that the physical appropriation of property gives rise to a per se taking. Applying this rule, Roberts held that the raisin reserve requirement constituted a physical taking because the government would physically seize the growers’ raisins. Roberts also held that the payout from raisin reserve sales did not change the takings analysis because courts only consider potential remaining uses of property when evaluating regulatory takings, not physical takings.

Roberts rejected Justice Sonia Sotomayor’s contention that the raisin reserve requirement was a mere condition on the privilege of being in the raisin market. Rather, Roberts held that selling produce "is not a special government benefit that the Government may hold hostage." To support this assertion, Roberts cited a footnote in Loretto v. Teleprompter Manhattan CATV Corp. (1982), which theorized that forfeiting rent payments would not be considered a mere condition on the privilege of being a landlord. Roberts also refused to apply the Tucker Act because that question was already resolved in Horne I. Finally, Roberts refused to remand the case back to a lower court to decide the amount of compensation to which Horne would be entitled because just compensation for a physical takings is the market value of the property taken, and the Government had already calculated that value when it fined Horne.

=== Thomas' concurring opinion ===
Justice Clarence Thomas wrote a separate concurring opinion in which he noted that he still thought Kelo v. City of New London (2005) was wrongly decided and that the reserve raisins probably were not validly taken for a public use. He therefore argued that remand would be "fruitless" because just compensation is only calculated for valid takings.

=== Breyer's concurring and dissenting opinion ===
Justice Stephen Breyer, along with Justices Ruth Bader Ginsburg and Elena Kagan, joined the portion of the majority's opinion that held the raisin reserve requirement constituted a physical taking. However, Breyer argued the case should be remanded to calculate just compensation. Breyer argued that the value of the fine may not be an appropriate method of valuing the raisins, because there can be no takings if the benefit Horne received from the price inflation was more valuable than the cost of the seized raisins. Furthermore, Breyer argued that if Horne received a net benefit from the marketing order, then he could not be excused from paying the fine for violating the order.

=== Sotomayor's dissenting opinion ===
Justice Sonia Sotomayor wrote a dissenting opinion in which she argued that the seizure of Horne's raisins did not constitute a taking. The ad hoc inquiry that governs regulatory takings, she argued, is only subject to stricter review in the "three narrow categories" of zoning permit exactions, deprivations of all economically beneficial use, and permanent physical occupations. Sotomayor claimed that there can only be a physical taking if the owner is absolutely dispossessed of all of her ownership interest. She stated that requiring raisin growers to physically give their crop to the government reserve might be "downright silly", but that it is not absolute dispossession because the government may later decide to pay out some of the reserve raisin sales to the growers. She also contended that the raisin reserve was not a taking because selling raisins is a government benefit. While she "could not agree more" with the Court that raisins "are not dangerous pesticides; they are a healthy snack", she still argued that even without safety concerns, the privilege of selling raisins are a government benefit subject to government conditions.

== See also ==
- List of United States Supreme Court cases, volume 569
- List of United States Supreme Court cases, volume 576
