= Hague v. Committee for Industrial Organization =

- Supreme Court of the United States

Argued February 27–28, 1939 Decided June 5, 1939
- Full case name: Frank Hague, Mayor, et al. v. Committee for Industrial Organization, et al.
- Citations: 307 U.S. 496 (more) 59 S. Ct. 954; 83 L. Ed. 1423; 1939 U.S. LEXIS 1067; 1 Lab. Cas. (CCH) ¶ 17,048; 4 L.R.R.M. 501

Case history
- Prior: Judgment for plaintiffs, permanent injunction granted, Committee for Industrial Organization v. Hague, 25 F. Supp. 127 (D.N.J. 1938); modified and affirmed, Hague v. Committee for Industrial Organization, 101 F.2d 774 (3d Cir. 1939); certiorari granted, 306 U.S. 624 (1939).

Holding
- Jersey City's ordinances that prohibit holding political meetings without a permit and distributing handbills are unconstitutional.

Court membership
- Chief Justice Charles E. Hughes Associate Justices James C. McReynolds · Pierce Butler; Harlan F. Stone · Owen Roberts; Hugo Black · Stanley F. Reed; Felix Frankfurter · William O. Douglas

Case opinions
- Plurality: Roberts, joined by Black; Hughes (in part)
- Concurrence: Stone, joined by Reed; Hughes (in part)
- Concurrence: Hughes
- Dissent: McReynolds
- Dissent: Butler
- Frankfurter and Douglas took no part in the consideration or decision of the case.

Laws applied
- U.S. Const. amend. XIV

Hague v. Committee for Industrial Organization, 307 U.S. 496 (1939), is a US labor law case decided by the United States Supreme Court.

== Facts ==
In Jersey City, New Jersey, Mayor Frank Hague had in 1937 used a city ordinance to prevent labor meetings in public places and stop the distribution of literature pertaining to the Committee for Industrial Organization's cause. He referred to the CIO as "communist."

== Judgment ==
District and circuit courts ruled in favor of the CIO, which brought the suit against the mayor for these actions and which was represented by Morris L. Ernst, Spaulding Frazer, Lee Pressman and Benjamin Kaplan. Hague appealed to the Supreme Court which ruled against him and held that Hague's ban on political meetings violated the First Amendment right to freedom of assembly, and so the ordinances were void.

This case brought forth the public forum to the Supreme Court, and is used as a tool for many other cases dealing with First Amendment Rights/ public forum issues. It took a long time after the 14th Amendment was adopted (1866) and ratified (1868) before the Supreme Court began to use it to assert individual rights against State and local Governments; which amplified the right to peacefully assemble and fight for freedom of speech.

Justice Roberts wrote in a concurring opinion that “[w]herever the title of streets and parks may rest, they have immemorially been held in trust for the use of the public and, time out of mind, have been used for purposes of assembly, communicating thoughts between citizens, and discussing public questions. Such use of the streets and public places has, from ancient times, been a part of the privileges, immunities, rights, and liberties of citizens.”

== See also ==
- US labor law
- History of labor law in the United States
- List of United States Supreme Court cases, volume 307
