= List of United States Supreme Court cases, volume 307 =

Supreme Court of the United States
- Interactive map of Supreme Court of the United States
- 38°53′26″N 77°00′16″W
- Established: March 4, 1789; 237 years ago
- Location: Washington, D.C.
- Coordinates: 38°53′26″N 77°00′16″W
- Composition method: Presidential nomination with Senate confirmation
- Authorised by: Constitution of the United States, Art. III, § 1
- Judge term length: life tenure, subject to impeachment and removal
- Number of positions: 9 (by statute)
- Website: supremecourt.gov

This is a list of cases reported in volume 307 of United States Reports, decided by the Supreme Court of the United States in 1939.

== Justices of the Supreme Court at the time of volume 307 U.S. ==
The Supreme Court is established by Article III, Section 1 of the Constitution of the United States, which says: "The judicial Power of the United States, shall be vested in one supreme Court . . .". The size of the Court is not specified; the Constitution leaves it to Congress to set the number of justices. Under the Judiciary Act of 1789 Congress originally fixed the number of justices at six (one chief justice and five associate justices). Since 1789 Congress has varied the size of the Court from six to seven, nine, ten, and back to nine justices (always including one chief justice).

When the cases in volume 307 were decided the Court comprised the following members:

Portrait	Justice	Office	Home State	Succeeded	Date confirmed by the Senate (Vote)	Tenure on Supreme Court
	Charles Evans Hughes	Chief Justice	New York	William Howard Taft	February 13, 1930 (52–26)	February 24, 1930 – June 30, 1941 (Retired)
	James Clark McReynolds	Associate Justice	Tennessee	Horace Harmon Lurton	August 29, 1914 (44–6)	October 12, 1914 – January 31, 1941 (Retired)
	Pierce Butler	Associate Justice	Minnesota	William R. Day	December 21, 1922 (61–8)	January 2, 1923 – November 16, 1939 (Died)
	Harlan F. Stone	Associate Justice	New York	Joseph McKenna	February 5, 1925 (71–6)	March 2, 1925 – July 2, 1941 (Continued as chief justice)
	Owen Roberts	Associate Justice	Pennsylvania	Edward Terry Sanford	May 20, 1930 (Acclamation)	June 2, 1930 – July 31, 1945 (Resigned)
	Hugo Black	Associate Justice	Alabama	Willis Van Devanter	August 17, 1937 (63–16)	August 19, 1937 – September 17, 1971 (Retired)
	Stanley Forman Reed	Associate Justice	Kentucky	George Sutherland	January 25, 1938 (Acclamation)	January 31, 1938 – February 25, 1957 (Retired)
	Felix Frankfurter	Associate Justice	Massachusetts	Benjamin Nathan Cardozo	January 17, 1939 (Acclamation)	January 30, 1939 – August 28, 1962 (Retired)
	William O. Douglas	Associate Justice	Connecticut	Louis Brandeis	April 4, 1939 (62–4)	April 17, 1939 – November 12, 1975 (Retired)

== Notable Cases in 307 U.S. ==
=== United States v. Miller ===
United States v. Miller, 307 U.S. 174 (1939), is a significant Supreme Court decision involving a Second Amendment to the United States Constitution challenge to the National Firearms Act of 1934 (NFA). The case is often cited in the ongoing American gun politics debate, as both sides claim that it supports their position.

=== Lane v. Wilson ===
In Lane v. Wilson, 307 U.S. 268 (1939), the Supreme Court ruled that a 12-day, one-time voter registration window was discriminatory for black citizens and repugnant to the Fifteenth Amendment.

=== Perkins, Secretary of Labor v. Elg ===
Perkins, Secretary of Labor v. Elg, 307 U.S. 325 (1939), is a decision by the Supreme Court that a child born in the United States to naturalized parents is a natural-born citizen, and that the child's U.S. citizenship is not lost if the child is taken to and raised in the country of the parents' origin, provided that upon attaining the age of majority, the young person elects to retain U.S. citizenship "and to return to the United States to assume its duties."

=== Coleman v. Miller, Secretary of the Senate of Kansas ===
Coleman v. Miller, Secretary of the Senate of Kansas, 307 U.S. 433 (1939), is a landmark decision of the Supreme Court, which clarified that if the Congress of the United States—when proposing for ratification an amendment to the United States Constitution, pursuant to Article V —chooses not to set a deadline by which the state legislatures of three-fourths of the states or, if prescribed by Congress state ratifying conventions in three-fourths of the states, must act upon the proposed amendment, then the proposed amendment remains pending business before the state legislatures (or ratifying conventions). The case centered on the Child Labor Amendment, which was proposed for ratification by Congress in 1924. In light of the precedent established by this ruling, three proposed constitutional amendments, in addition to the Child Labor Amendment, are considered still to be pending before the state legislatures, since Congress did not specify a ratification deadline: the Congressional Apportionment Amendment since 1789; the Titles of Nobility Amendment since 1810; and the Corwin Amendment since 1861.

== Federal court system ==
Under the Judiciary Act of 1789 the federal court structure at the time comprised District Courts, which had general trial jurisdiction; Circuit Courts, which had mixed trial and appellate (from the US District Courts) jurisdiction; and the United States Supreme Court, which had appellate jurisdiction over the federal District and Circuit courts—and for certain issues over state courts. The Supreme Court also had limited original jurisdiction (i.e., in which cases could be filed directly with the Supreme Court without first having been heard by a lower federal or state court). There were one or more federal District Courts and/or Circuit Courts in each state, territory, or other geographical region.

The Judiciary Act of 1891 created the United States Courts of Appeals and reassigned the jurisdiction of most routine appeals from the district and circuit courts to these appellate courts. The Act created nine new courts that were originally known as the "United States Circuit Courts of Appeals." The new courts had jurisdiction over most appeals of lower court decisions. The Supreme Court could review either legal issues that a court of appeals certified or decisions of court of appeals by writ of certiorari. On January 1, 1912, the effective date of the Judicial Code of 1911, the old Circuit Courts were abolished, with their remaining trial court jurisdiction transferred to the U.S. District Courts.

== List of cases in volume 307 U.S. ==
Case name	Citation	Opinion of the Court	Vote	Concurring opinion or statement	Dissenting opinion or statement	Procedural jurisdiction	Result
Chippewa Indians of Minnesota v. United States	307 U.S. 1 (1939)	Roberts	8-0[a]	none	none	appeal from the United States Court of Claims (Ct. Cl.)	affirmed
Electric Storage Battery Company v. Shimadzu	307 U.S. 5 (1939)	Roberts	8-0[a]	none	none	certiorari to the United States Court of Appeals for the Third Circuit (3d Cir.)	reversed
Kessler v. Strecker	307 U.S. 22 (1939)	Roberts	6-2[a]	none	McReynolds (opinion; joined by Butler)	certiorari to the United States Court of Appeals for the Fifth Circuit (5th Cir.)	affirmed
Mulford v. Smith	307 U.S. 38 (1939)	Roberts	6-2[a]	none	Butler (opinion; with which McReynolds concurred)	appeal from the United States District Court for the Middle District of Georgia (M.D. Ga.)	affirmed
United States Trust Company v. Helvering, Commissioner of Internal Revenue	307 U.S. 57 (1939)	Black	8-0[a]	none	none	certiorari to the United States Court of Appeals for the Second Circuit (2d Cir.)	affirmed
McCrone v. United States	307 U.S. 61 (1939)	Black	8-0[a]	none	none	certiorari to the United States Court of Appeals for the Ninth Circuit (9th Cir.)	affirmed
Gibbs, Attorney General of Florida v. Buck	307 U.S. 66 (1939)	Reed	6-1[a][b]	none	Black (opinion)	appeal from the United States District Court for the Northern District of Florida (N.D. Fla.)	affirmed
Buck v. Gallagher, State Treasurer of Washington	307 U.S. 95 (1939)	Reed	6-1[a][b]	none	Black (without opinion)	appeal from the United States District Court for the Western District of Washington (W.D. Wash.)	reversed
Driscoll and Others, Constituting the Pennsylvania Public Utility Commission v. Edison Light and Power Company	307 U.S. 104 (1939)	Reed	8-0[a]	Frankfurter (opinion; with which Black concurred)	none	appeal from the United States District Court for the Eastern District of Pennsylvania (E.D. Pa.)	reversed
Rochester Telephone Corporation v. United States	307 U.S. 125 (1939)	Frankfurter	8-0[a]	McReynolds (without opinion); Butler (opinion; with which McReynolds concurred)	none	appeal from the United States District Court for the Western District of New York (W.D.N.Y.)	affirmed
United States v. Maher, doing business as Interstate Busses	307 U.S. 148 (1939)	Frankfurter	8-0[a]	none	none	appeal from the United States District Court for the District of Oregon (D. Or.)	reversed
Federal Power Commission v. Pacific Power and Light Company	307 U.S. 156 (1939)	Frankfurter	8-0[a]	none	none	certiorari to the United States Court of Appeals for the Ninth Circuit (9th Cir.)	affirmed
Sprague v. Ticonic National Bank	307 U.S. 161 (1939)	Frankfurter	8-0[a]	McReynolds and Butler (without opinions)	none	certiorari to the United States Court of Appeals for the First Circuit (1st Cir.)	reversed
William Jameson and Company v. Morgenthau, Secretary of the Treasury	307 U.S. 171 (1939)	per curiam	9-0	none	none	appeal from the United States District Court for the District of Columbia (D.D.C. )	vacated
United States v. Miller	307 U.S. 174 (1939)	McReynolds	8-0[a]	none	none	appeal from the United States District Court for the Western District of Arkansas (W.D. Ark.)	reversed
United States v. Morgan	307 U.S. 183 (1939)	Stone	5-3[c]	none	Butler (opinion; joined by McReynolds and Roberts)	appeal from the United States District Court for the Western District of Missouri (W.D. Mo.)	reversed
United States v. Marxen	307 U.S. 200 (1939)	Reed	7-0[a][d]	none	none	certified question from the United States Court of Appeals for the Ninth Circuit (9th Cir.)	certified question answered
Rorick v. Everglades Drainage District	307 U.S. 208 (1939)	Frankfurter	8-0[a]	none	none	appeal from the United States District Court for the Northern District of Florida (N.D. Fla.)	vacated
United States v. Powers	307 U.S. 214 (1939)	Douglas	9-0	none	none	appeal from the United States District Court for the Southern District of Texas (S.D. Tex.)	reversed
United States v. One 1936 Model Ford V-8 Deluxe Coach	307 U.S. 219 (1939)	McReynolds	4-3[e][f]	none	Douglas (opinion; joined by Black and Frankfurter)	certiorari to the United States Court of Appeals for the Fourth Circuit (4th Cir.)	affirmed
Electric Fittings Corporation v. Thomas and Betts Company	307 U.S. 241 (1939)	Roberts	9-0	none	none	certiorari to the United States Court of Appeals for the Second Circuit (2d Cir.)	reversed
Maytag Company v. Hurley Machine Company	307 U.S. 243 (1939)	Roberts	9-0	none	none	certiorari to the United States Court of Appeals for the Second Circuit (2d Cir.)	affirmed (two cases); reversed (one case)
Guaranty Trust Company v. Henwood	307 U.S. 247 (1939)	Black	5-4	none	Stone (opinion; with which Hughes, MccReynolds, and Butler concurred)	certiorari to the United States Court of Appeals for the Eighth Circuit (8th Cir.)	affirmed
Bethlehem Steel Company v. Zurich General Accident and Liability Insurance Company	307 U.S. 265 (1939)	Black	5-4	none	Hughes, McReynolds, Butler, and Stone (joint short statement)	certiorari to the New York Supreme Court (N.Y. Sup. Ct.)	reversed
Lane v. Wilson	307 U.S. 268 (1939)	Frankfurter	6-2[a]	none	McReynolds and Butler (without opinions)	certiorari to the United States Court of Appeals for the Tenth Circuit (10th Cir.)	reversed
O'Malley, Collector of Internal Revenue v. Woodrough	307 U.S. 277 (1939)	Frankfurter	7-1[g]	none	Butler (opinion)	appeal from the United States District Court for the District of Nebraska (D. Neb.)	reversed
Rorick v. Devon Syndicate, Ltd.	307 U.S. 299 (1939)	Douglas	9-0	none	none	certiorari to the United States Court of Appeals for the Sixth Circuit (6th Cir.)	reversed
Newark Fire Insurance Company v. State Board of Tax Appeals of New Jersey	307 U.S. 313 (1939)	plurality opinions	8-1	Reed (opinion; with which Hughes, Butler, and Roberts concurred); Frankfurter (opinion; with which Stone, Black, and Douglas concurred)	McReynolds (without opinion)	appeal from the New Jersey Court of Errors and Appeals (N.J.)	affirmed
Perkins, Secretary of Labor v. Elg	307 U.S. 325 (1939)	Hughes	8-0[a]	none	none	certiorari to the United States Court of Appeals for the District of Columbia (D.C. Cir.)	affirmed as modified
Toledo Pressed Steel Company v. Standard Parts, Inc.	307 U.S. 350 (1939)	Butler	8-0[a]	none	none	certiorari to the United States Court of Appeals for the Sixth Circuit (6th Cir.)	affirmed (two cases); reversed (one case)
Curry, State Tax Commissioner of Alabama v. McCanless, Commissioner of Finance and Taxation of Tennessee	307 U.S. 357 (1939)	Stone	5-4	Reed (short statement)	Butler (opinion; joined by Hughes, McReynolds, and Roberts)	appeal from the Tennessee Supreme Court (Tenn.)	reversed
Graves and Others, Commissioners Constituting the State Tax Commission of New York v. Elliott	307 U.S. 383 (1939)	Stone	5-4	none	Hughes (opinion; with which McReynolds, Butler, and Roberts concurred)	certiorari to the New York Surrogate's Court of New York County (N.Y. Cnty. Sur. Ct.)	reversed
Southern Pacific Company v. United States	307 U.S. 393 (1939)	Reed	5-3[a]	none	Butler (opinion; joined by McReynolds and Roberts)	certiorari to the United States Court of Claims (Ct. Cl.)	affirmed
Coleman v. Miller, Secretary of the Senate of Kansas	307 U.S. 433 (1939)	Hughes	7-2	Black (opinion; joined by Roberts, Frankfurter, and Douglas); Frankfurter (opinion)	Butler (opinion; joined by McReynolds)	certiorari to the Kansas Supreme Court (Kan.)	affirmed
Chandler, Governor of Kentucky v. Wise	307 U.S. 474 (1939)	Hughes	7-2	Black and Douglas (joint short statement)	McReynolds and Butler (joint short statement)	certiorari to the Kentucky Court of Appeals (Ky.)	dismissed
Baldwin v. Scott County Milling Company	307 U.S. 478 (1939)	Butler	9-0	none	none	certiorari to the Missouri Supreme Court (Mo.)	reversed
American Toll Bridge Company v. Railroad Commission of California	307 U.S. 486 (1939)	Butler	9-0	Black, Frankfurter, and Douglas (without opinions)	none	appeal from the California Supreme Court (Cal.)	affirmed
Hague v. Committee for Industrial Organization	307 U.S. 496 (1939)	plurality opinions	5-2[a][b]	Roberts (opinion; with which Black concurred); Stone (opinion; with which Reed concurred); Hughes (short statement)	McReynolds (short statement); Butler (short statement)	certiorari to the United States Court of Appeals for the Third Circuit (3d Cir.)	affirmed as modified
United States v. Rock Royal Co-op	307 U.S. 533 (1939)	Reed	5-4	Black and Douglas (joint short statement)	McReynolds and Butler (joint opinion); Roberts (opinion; joined by Hughes, McReynolds, and Butler)	appeal from the United States District Court for the Northern District of New York (N.D.N.Y.)	mixed outcomes
H.P. Hood and Sons, Inc. v. United States	307 U.S. 588 (1939)	Reed	6–3	none	Roberts (opinion; joined by McReynolds and Butler)	certiorari to the United States Court of Appeals for the First Circuit (1st Cir.)	affirmed

[a] Douglas took no part in the case
[b] Frankfurter took no part in the case
[c] Reed took no part in the case
[d] Hughes took no part in the case
[e] Butler took no part in the case
[f] Stone took no part in the case
[g] McReynolds took no part in the case
