= Grade A milk =

American food consumption standard

Sunset Hill Farm Milk Cap from Valparaiso, Indiana advertising its product as Grade A

In the United States, Grade A milk, also called fluid grade milk, refers to milk produced under sufficiently sanitary conditions to qualify for fluid (beverage) consumption. Only Grade A milk is regulated under federal milk marketing orders. Grade B milk (also referred to as manufacturing grade milk) does not meet fluid grade standards and can only be used in cheese, butter and nonfat dry milk. More than 40% of all milk produced nationally is Grade A, and much of the Grade A milk supply is used in manufactured dairy products.
