= No Budget, No Pay Act =

Proposed legislation of the 112th United States Congress

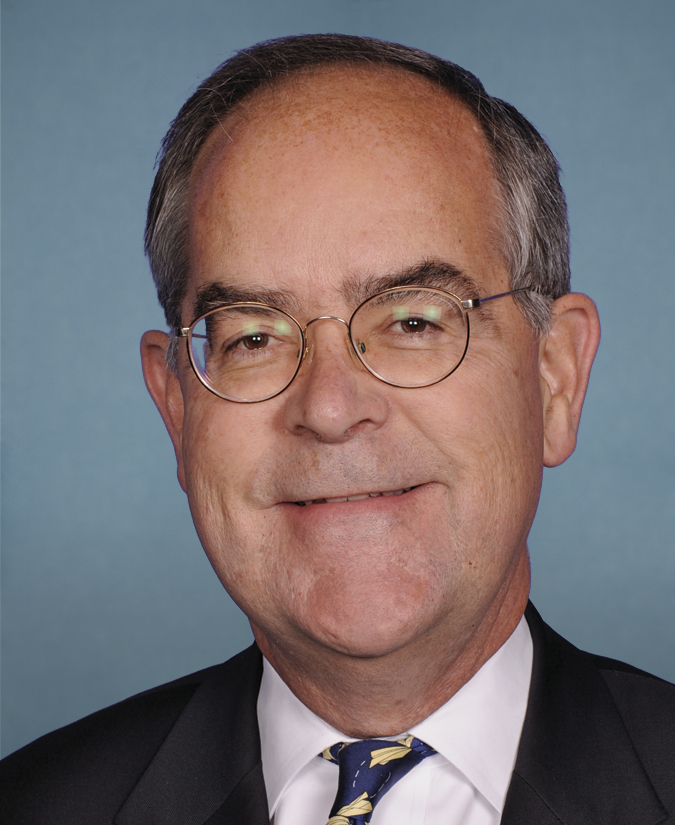
- Jim Cooper, author of the bill

The No Budget, No Pay Act was legislation proposed in the United States Congress providing that members of Congress would receive no salary unless Congress passed a budget by October 1, 2012.

Representative Jim Cooper, a Democrat from Tennessee, introduced this bill in the United States House of Representatives.

== Purpose ==
Even though before 2025, Congress has passed single year budgets since 2009 (Pub. L. 112–10 (text) (PDF), Pub. L. 112–55 (text) (PDF), Pub. L. 112–74 (text) (PDF), Pub. L. 112–77 (text) (PDF)), Congress has not passed a multi-year budget since 2009. The main idea behind this bill is that in order for congressmen to reach across the aisle and compromise they must have their pay taken away.

The annual salary of a member of Congress is $174,000.

Reid Ribble, a Republican congressman from Wisconsin, said "You have to take away the one thing every member of Congress really wants, and that's their paycheck at the end of every month. You take it away until they get their job done and I think you would see miraculously bipartisan work to get something done."

Jim Cooper, the lead sponsor and author of the bill, said "If we can show a greater number of co-sponsors leadership will have to pay attention. It's no secret this is not popular with leadership. But they want to be popular with members... Any other job in the world, you don't do your job you don't get paid. Congress shouldn't be any different."

== Support and opposition ==
The bill received limited bipartisan support, and garnered 48 supporters, although it was seen as unlikely to be voted on due to the division of Congress.

Likewise, the bill received some bipartisan opposition from members of Congress who argue that it may violate the 27th Amendment to the United States Constitution, which states "No law, varying the compensation for the services of the Senators and Representatives, shall take effect until an election of Representatives shall have intervened."

== See also ==
- No Budget, No Pay Act of 2013
- No Budget, No Pay Act of 2025
