= Lane v. Wilson =

- Supreme Court of the United States

Argued March 3, 1939 Decided May 22, 1939
- Full case name: Lane v. Wilson et al.
- Citations: 307 U.S. 268 (more) 59 S. Ct. 872; 83 L. Ed. 1281

Case history
- Prior: 98 F.2d 980 (10th Cir. 1938); cert. granted, 305 U.S. 591 (1938).

Court membership
- Chief Justice Charles E. Hughes Associate Justices James C. McReynolds · Pierce Butler; Harlan F. Stone · Owen Roberts; Hugo Black · Stanley F. Reed; Felix Frankfurter · William O. Douglas

Case opinions
- Majority: Frankfurter, joined by Hughes, Stone, Roberts, Black, Reed
- Dissent: McReynolds, Butler
- Douglas took no part in the consideration or decision of the case.

Lane v. Wilson, 307 U.S. 268 (1939), was a United States Supreme Court case that found a 12-day one-time voter registration window to be discriminatory for black citizens who were excluded from voting prior and repugnant to the Fifteenth Amendment. It eliminated the power of county registrars illegally excluding black citizens.

== Background ==
In 1915, the Supreme Court of the United States held in Guinn v. United States that a grandfather clause to Oklahoma's literacy test for voting was unconstitutional, violating the Fifteenth Amendment. In response, the Oklahoma legislature passed a law giving citizens of the state a 12-day period, from April 30 to May 11, 1916, in which they were allowed to register to vote. Individuals who were eligible but missed that registration period would be barred permanently from voting. But, a grandfather clause exempting citizens who had voted in 1914, that is, before Guinn, largely exempted white voters from the provisions of the narrow registration window. In practice, the registration period worked against black citizens.

I. W. Lane, a citizen of the "All-Black" settlement of Redbird, Oklahoma, was refused a voter registration by the county elections clerk and sued for $5,000 in damages. The district court found against him on partially technical grounds, and the Tenth Circuit Court of Appeals upheld the ruling of the district court. Lane appealed to the US Supreme Court.

== Decision and impact ==
Justice Frankfurter delivered the ruling of the court, which held that Oklahoma's registration window and grandfather clause violated the Fifteenth Amendment to the United States Constitution. Frankfurter found that although whites who had chosen not to vote before 1915 were also theoretically disenfranchised by the law, it had a disproportionate effect on Black voters who had been largely unable to vote before 1915.

According to Michael Klarman, the decision had little practical impact, as most Oklahoma election clerks had simply ignored the law on the registration window and permitted black suffrage after the 1915 ruling. No legal incidents are known to have occurred after the Lane ruling.

== See also ==
- List of United States Supreme Court cases
