= Buck v. Gallagher =

- Supreme Court of the United States

Argued January 10, 1939 Decided April 17, 1939
- Full case name: Buck v. Gallagher
- Citations: 307 U.S. 95 (more) 59 S. Ct. 740; 83 L. Ed. 1128

Holding
- 1) ASCAP members have a common and undivided interest in the right to license in association through the Society free of the state statute. 2) The lower court should have allowed ASCAP members the opportunity to price the cost of complying with the statute and the value of the copyrights affected by it.

Court membership
- Chief Justice Charles E. Hughes Associate Justices James C. McReynolds · Pierce Butler; Harlan F. Stone · Owen Roberts; Hugo Black · Stanley F. Reed; Felix Frankfurter · William O. Douglas

Case opinions
- Majority: Reed
- Dissent: Black

Buck v. Gallagher, 307 U.S. 95 (1939), was a United States Supreme Court case in which the Court had two main holdings. First, American Society of Composers, Authors and Publishers (ASCAP) members have a common and undivided interest in the right to license in association through the Society free of the state statute. Second, the lower court should have allowed ASCAP members the opportunity to price the cost of complying with the statute and the value of the copyrights affected by it.
