= Basing point =

A basing point is a geographical site used to establish minimum fluid milk prices for federal milk marketing orders. Generally, minimum fluid farm milk prices increase according to the distance from the basing point. When federal milk marketing orders began in the 1930s, Eau Claire, Wisconsin was viewed as the principal surplus milk production region in the nation and hence served as the basing point for most milk priced under federal milk marketing orders. Generally, the further a region is from the Upper Midwest, the higher that region's minimum price for fluid farm milk. Some have argued that there currently are other surplus production regions in the country (e.g., in the northeast and southwest) which should serve as basing points. An attempt by USDA to establish a pricing structure using multiple basing points was thwarted by legislation in 1999.
