= Marketing agreements =

Orders authorised by Agricultural Marketing Agreement Act

In United States agricultural policy, marketing agreements (and marketing orders) are authorized by the Agricultural Marketing Agreement Act of 1937 (50 Stat. 246), as amended). They may be designed to:

1. maintain the high quality of produce that is on the market;
2. standardize packages and containers;
3. regulate the flow of product to market;
4. establish reserve pools for storable commodities; and
5. authorize production research, marketing research and development, and advertising.

In contrast to marketing orders, agreements are enforceable only against those handlers who enter into the agreement. Federal oversight is provided by the Agricultural Marketing Service.

== See also ==
- Marketing orders and agreements
