= Salary Grab Act =

1873 American federal law

- Other short titles: Legislative, Executive, and Judicial Appropriations Act of 1873 · Act of March 3, 1873
- Long title: An Act making appropriations for the legislative, executive, and judicial expenses of the Government for the year ending June thirtieth, eighteen hundred and seventy-four, and for other purposes.
- Nicknames: The Salary Grab
- Enacted by: the 42nd United States Congress
- Effective: March 3, 1873

Citations
- Public law: Chapter 226
- Statutes at Large: 17 Stat. 485

Legislative history
- Introduced in the House as H.R. 2991 by R‑OH James A. Garfieldth on December 1872; Committee consideration by House Committee on Appropriations; Passed the House on January 1873 (Voice vote); Passed the Senate on February 1873 (Voice vote); Reported by the joint conference committee on February–March 1873; agreed to by the House on March 3, 1873 (102–95 (agreed to conference report)) and by the Senate on March 3, 1873 (36–27 (agreed to conference report)); Signed into law by President Ulysses S. Grant on March 3, 1873

Major amendments
- Repealed on January 20, 1874 (18 Stat. 4)

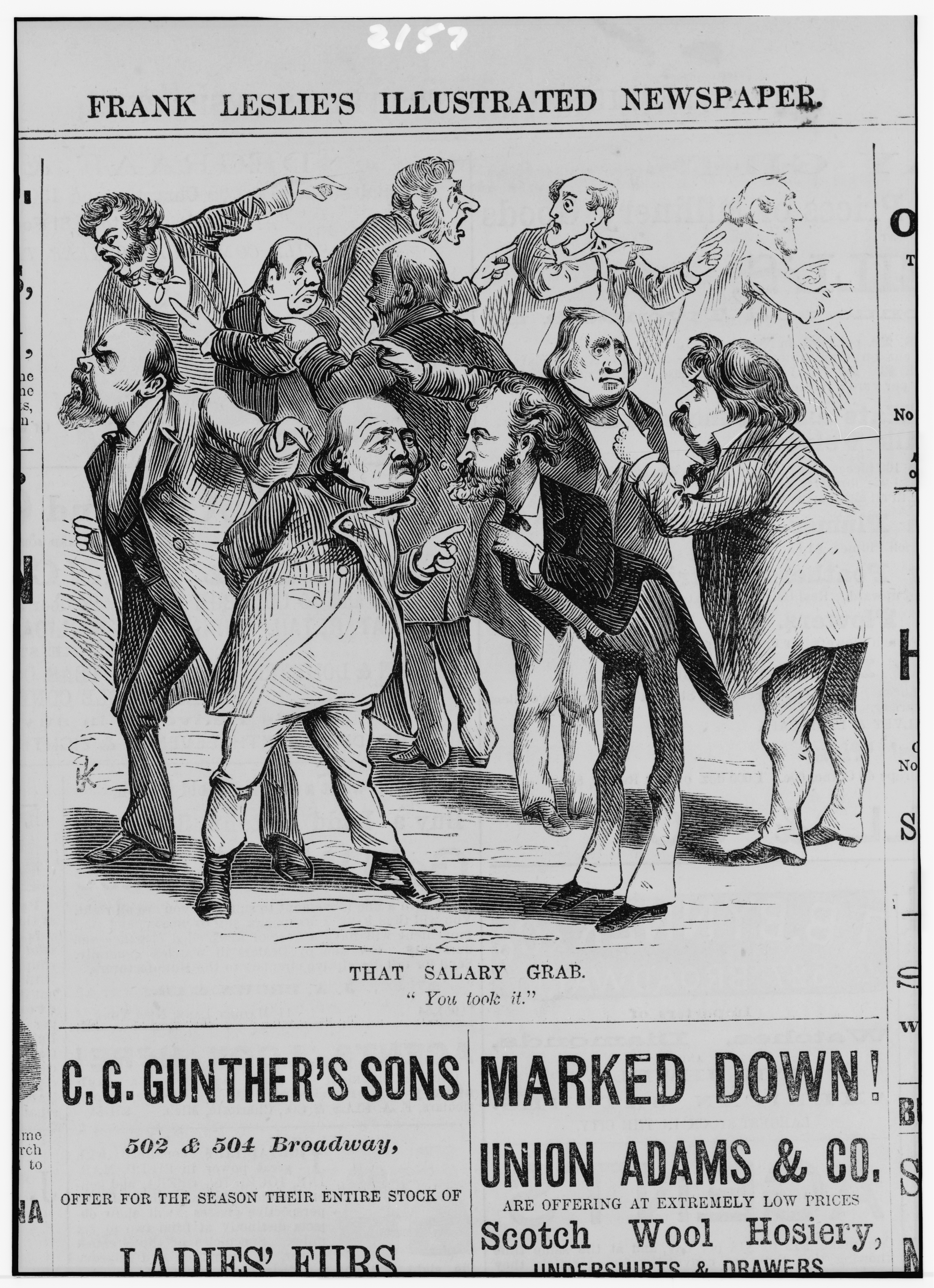
Politicians accusing each other for taking the Salary Grab. The caption reads: That salary grab—"You took it". Frank Leslie's Illustrated Newspaper, 27 December 1873

The Salary Grab Act, officially known as the Legislative, Executive, and Judicial Expenses Appropriation Act, was passed by the United States Congress on March 3, 1873, and sparked a firestorm of controversy among members of the government, the general public, and the press. President Ulysses S. Grant signed the act the day before his inauguration for a second term to double the salary of the president and those of Supreme Court Justices.

The proposal for a salary increase was fueled by what was considered low pay for members in government, while the salary for the president was the same as it had been for George Washington. The bill subsequently included a 50 percent salary increase for the president and for members of Congress, retroactive to the beginning of their term, which was the most highly contested provision in the bill. Public outcry led Congress to rescind the congressional salary increase. As a protest against the act, the Ohio General Assembly ratified what later became the Twenty-seventh Amendment. The controversy surrounding the bill was one of the contributing factors to the Republicans losing many seats in the 1874–75 United States House of Representatives elections, resulting in a Democratic majority in the United States House of Representatives which began one of the most competitive two-party periods in American history.

== Background ==
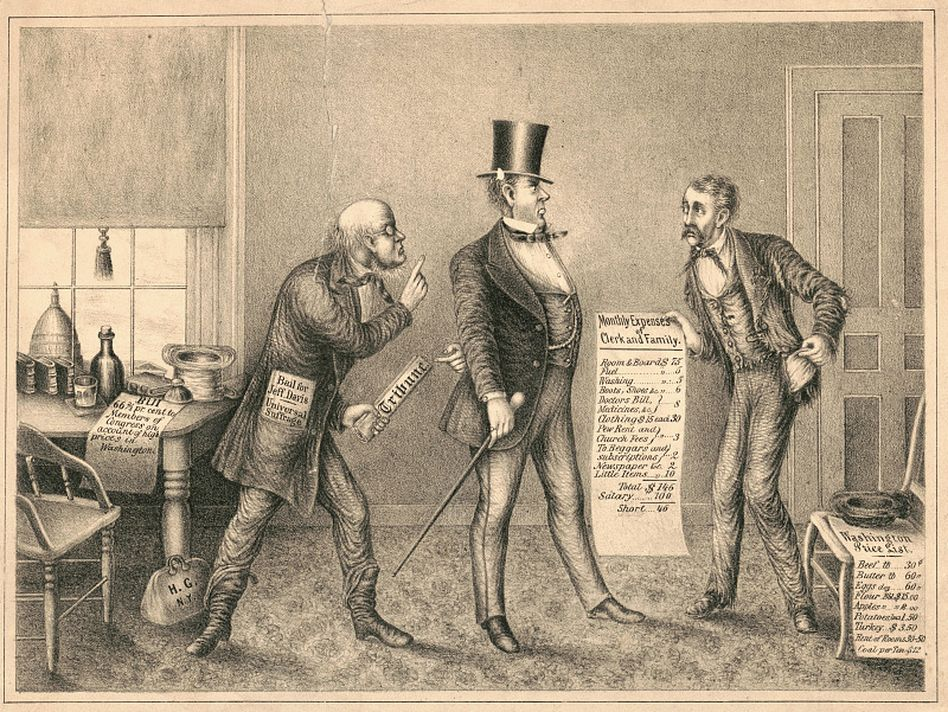
Salary Grab Act cartoon, featuring Horace Greeley at left (Note: The image depicts a well-dressed man at center, looking down on an impoverished man holding an itemized list labeled "Monthly Expenses Clerk and Family" which shows that the man comes up $46.00 short each month, next to him on a chair is another itemized list labeled "Washington Price List" outlining the costs of various food items, lodging, and fuel. At left, Horace Greeley, who died several months before the "Salary Grab Act" came up in Congress, stands with his right hand raised and appears to be admonishing the man at center, holding a copy of the New-York Tribune in his left hand and papers in his coat pocket state "Bail for Jeff Davis—Universal Suffrage". At far left is a "Bill" on a table which reads, "66 2/3 pr. cent to Members of Congress on account of high prices in Washington". The U.S. Capitol building can be seen through a window.)

Before legislation for an across the board increase in pay for government officials, officials in and out of government had complained that their salaries were insufficient to meet the expenses involved with their office and the high costs of living in Washington, D.C. The president's salary, at $25,000 a year, had not increased since George Washington was president, while the purchasing power of the dollar had decreased. Congressional salaries had not been increased since 1852. While the government provided a house and a domestic staff for the president, Grant, like all presidents before him, paid for his own living expenses.

Before passage of the act, salaries for members of Congress and Cabinet members were $5,000 and $8,000 respectively, significantly more than the wages for the average American. Members of Congress were also supposed to pay for their own residences while in Washington, where rents had increased as much as 25% since the Civil War. When President Grant abolished the franking privilege, a considerable yearly sum for government officials who frequently corresponded, their expenses increased further. Professional needs also prompted the effort to increase salaries for government officials. Members of Congress were not provided by the government with a professional staff. Thus any member who employed administrators or personal clerks had to pay them directly out of his own pocket. Any member who was not financially well-off and needed clerical assistance was faced with a financial hardship, as Washington was a very expensive place in which to live. To meet the cost of living many government officials were forced to take on other forms of employment on the side, often resuming their former professions, usually between Congressional sessions.

=== Emergence of the salary act ===
The idea of increasing the salaries for government officials with legislation that became known as the "Salary Grab" was conceived in the final days of the 42nd Congress, during the normal course of congressional business, and was first introduced on February 7, 1873, in the House Judiciary Committee, chaired by Benjamin Butler, a Stalwart Republican (Note: The Stalwarts had close ties to the Grant administration. Best known among the Stalwarts were Butler, Carpenter, and Roscoe Conkling. Their principle rivals were the so called "Half Breeds", moderate Republicans led by James Blaine.) from Massachusetts. The so-called "Salary Grab Act" first attracted attention on February 7, 1873, put forth by Butler, from Massachusetts, who on that day stated that he had been directed by the Committee on the Judiciary to submit a bill lending itself to the subject of salaries in the executive, legislative and judicial branches of government, along with a report in writing from Butler, who stated, "I desire to say that the report is not drawn by myself, but I present it by order of the committee, and I concur in its statements." The bill was received and read aloud twice, and submitted. On February 10, Butler moved that the Committee on Appropriations be directed to include the salary increase in the Miscellaneous Appropriation Bill, for the committee's consideration. Butler also moved for a suspension of the rules in order to allow that this motion be entertained by the committee.

The amendment specified that the annual salary for Presidents, which at the time had remained unchanged since the presidency of George Washington, would double to $50,000, while the annual salaries of Supreme Court Justices and Cabinet members would increase to $10,000, and the annual salaries of civil servants would also increase. Moreover, members of Congress would receive a pay increase from $5,000 to $7,500 annually. The congressional increase would be retroactive to the beginning of the 42nd Congress, almost two full years earlier. This meant that all members of Congress would receive a lump sum payment of roughly $4,000 for "services rendered" when the session came to a close. The House, on 24 February 1873, assembled to conduct the routine procedure of working out a legislative appropriations bill.

Both Houses acted immediately and passed the conference bill; the House by a 102–95 vote, and the Senate by a 36–27 vote, whereafter President Grant signed the bill into law on March 3, 1873, the final day of the 42nd Congress. In little time the proposed salary increase in congressional salaries became a controversial issue in all branches of government as well as with much of the general public and the press. (Note: Press coverage: "The National Republican Convention". The Democratic Press. Ravenna, Ohio. 4 September 1873. p. 2 – via Newspapers.com.; "Congressional Pay Raises". The Evening Sun. Baltimore, Maryland. 12 June 1945. p. 12 – via Newspapers.com.; "Notes and Comments". Argus and Patriot. Montpelier, Vermont. 11 December 1873. p. 7 – via Newspapers.com.; "The Party of Frauds". The American Citizen. Canton, Mississippi. 20 September 1873. p. 1 – via Newspapers.com.; "'Grabs' and 'Steals'". The Daily Evening Express. Lancaster, Pennsylvania. 7 May 1873. p. 7 – via Newspapers.com.; "The Salary Grab". The Clarion-Ledger. Jackson, Mississippi. 24 July 1873. p. 1 – via Newspapers.com.; "Grant's 'Salary Grab' Act". The Journal and Tribune. Knoxville, Tennessee. 13 January 1907. p. 28 – via Newspapers.com.; "Political Scandals Which Brought Ruin". The Journal and Tribune. Knoxville, Tennessee. 13 January 1907. p. 7 – via Newspapers.com.; "The Last Salary Grab". The New York Times. 10 November 1901. p. 22 – via Newspapers.com.) The newspapers immediately characterized the pay raise as the "Salary Grab Act", associated its promotion to the recent Crédit Mobilier scandal, and accused the governing Republican majority in Congress of perpetuating an atmosphere of corruption. Most of the criticism, especially from liberal reformers, was aimed at Republicans. Along with the Crédit Mobilier scandal, the so-called Salary Grab Act or "Salary steal" fueled a widespread notion that the party in power was hopelessly corrupt. However, the connection of the Liberals with the "salary grab" was easily open to criticism. Four Liberal senators and one representative supported the salary increases, and never returned their back pay.

Elihu Washburne, Minister to France, who was a Republican himself and former ally of Grant, writing from Paris, characterized Congress as "simply a gang of thieves...what a pity the President did not veto the salary steal". President Grant reasoned that blocking the bill would have rendered all three branches of government underfunded, requiring the new 43rd Congress to conduct a special session to start the process all over again. Due to the large public outcry, and in an attempt to deflect criticism, a few of the Senators and Representatives returned their bonuses to the United States government Treasury Department, while others donated it to colleges or charities. However, the criticism persisted, and the Republicans lost ninety-six seats in the House, including Butler. The huge loss resulted in the Democratic party returning to prominence for the first time since before the Civil War. As a result, the 1874 election initiated one of the most competitive two-party periods in American history, lasting more than twenty years. During the opening of the next Congress, January 20, 1874, House members repealed the Appropriation Act, sustaining only the salary increases for the President and Supreme Court Justices, while all others abandoned any hope of a continuing salary increase.

== See also ==
- Presidency of Ulysses S. Grant
- Twenty-seventh Amendment to the United States Constitution

== Bibliography ==
- Brands, H. W. (2012). The Man Who Saved the Union: Ulysses S. Grant in War and Peace. New York: Doubleday. ISBN 978-0-385-53241-9.
- Calhoun, Charles W. (2017). The Presidency of Ulysses S. Grant. Lawrence: University Press of Kansas. ISBN 978-0-7006-2484-3.
- Dean, John W. (7 September 2002). "The Telling Tale of the Twenty-Seventh Amendment: A Sleeping Amendment Concerning Congressional Compensation Is Later Revived". FindLaw.
- Jenkins, Jeffery A.; Alston, Lee J.; Nonnenmacher, Tomas (September 2006). "Who Should Govern Congress? The Salary Grab of 1873 and the Coalition of Reform". The Journal of Economic History. 66 (3). Cambridge University Press: 674–706. JSTOR 3874856.
- McPherson, Hon. Edward, LL.D. (1874). Hand-Book of Politics for 1874. University of Michigan.
- Robinson, William Stevens (1873). Salary Grab Act. Boston: Lee and Shepard, Publishers.
- Ross, Earle Dudley (1919). The Liberal Republican Movement. New York: Cornell University; The Rumford Press.
- Smith, Jean Edward (2001). Grant. New York: Simon & Schuster. ISBN 0-684-84927-5.
- Theriault, Sean M. (2005). The Power of the People: Congressional Competition, Public Attention, and Voter Retribution. Ohio State University Press. ISBN 978-0-8142-0992-9.
