= Gibbs v. Buck =

- Supreme Court of the United States

Decided April 17, 1939
- Full case name: Gibbs v. Buck
- Citations: 307 U.S. 66 (more) 59 S. Ct. 725; 83 L. Ed. 1111

Holding
- 1) An association of copyright holders, ASCAP, may sum their collective costs to meet the damages threshold for federal jurisdiction. 2) A motion to dismiss allegations that raise "grave doubts about the constitutionality" of legislation should be denied.

Court membership
- Chief Justice Charles E. Hughes Associate Justices James C. McReynolds · Pierce Butler; Harlan F. Stone · Owen Roberts; Hugo Black · Stanley F. Reed; Felix Frankfurter · William O. Douglas

Case opinions
- Majority: Reed, joined by Hughes, McReynolds, Butler, Stone, Roberts, Frankfurter, Douglas
- Dissent: Black

Gibbs v. Buck, 307 U.S. 66 (1939), was a United States Supreme Court case in which the Court had two main holdings. First, an association of copyright holders, ASCAP, may sum their collective costs to meet the damages threshold for federal jurisdiction. Second, a motion to dismiss allegations that raise "grave doubts about the constitutionality" of legislation should be denied.
