= Coleman v. Miller =

- Supreme Court of the United States

Argued October 10, 1938 Reargued April 17–April 18, 1939 Decided June 5, 1939
- Full case name: Coleman, et al. v. Miller, Secretary of the Senate of State of Kansas, et al.
- Citations: 307 U.S. 433 (more) 59 S. Ct. 972; 83 L. Ed. 1385; 1939 U.S. LEXIS 1066; 1 Lab. Cas. (CCH) ¶ 17,046; 122 A.L.R. 695

Case history
- Prior: Cert. to the Supreme Court of Kansas

Holding
- A proposed amendment to the Federal Constitution is considered pending before the states indefinitely unless Congress establishes a deadline by which the states must act. Further, Congress—not the courts—is responsible for deciding whether an amendment has been validly ratified.

Court membership
- Chief Justice Charles E. Hughes Associate Justices James C. McReynolds · Pierce Butler; Harlan F. Stone · Owen Roberts; Hugo Black · Stanley F. Reed; Felix Frankfurter · William O. Douglas

Case opinions
- Majority: Hughes, joined by Stone, Roberts, Black, Reed, Frankfurter, Douglas
- Concurrence: Black, joined by Roberts, Frankfurter, Douglas
- Dissent: Butler, joined by McReynolds
- Statement: Frankfurter

Laws applied
- U.S. Const. Art. V
- This case overturned a previous ruling or rulings
- Dillon v. Gloss (1921) (in part)

Coleman v. Miller, 307 U.S. 433 (1939), is a landmark decision of the United States Supreme Court which clarified that when proposing for the ratification of an amendment to the United States Constitution, pursuant to Article V thereof, if the Congress of the United States chooses not to set a deadline by which the proposed amendment must be acted upon by the requisite three-fourths of state legislatures or state ratifying conventions, then the proposed amendment remains pending business before the state legislatures (or ratifying conventions). The case centered on the Child Labor Amendment, which was proposed for ratification by Congress in 1924.

== Background ==
The practice of limiting the time available to the states to ratify proposed amendments began in 1917 with the Eighteenth Amendment. All amendments proposed since then, with the exception of the Nineteenth Amendment and the Child Labor Amendment, have included a deadline, either in the body of the proposed amendment, or in the joint resolution transmitting it to the states. In its decision the Court concluded that Congress was quite aware in 1924 that—had it desired to do so—it could have imposed a deadline upon the Child Labor Amendment and Congress simply chose not to.

== Decision ==
According to Coleman, it is none other than the Congress itself—if and when the Congress should later be presented with valid ratifications from the required number of states—which has the discretion to arbitrate the question of whether too much time has elapsed between Congress' initial proposal of that amendment and the most recent state ratification thereof assuming that, as a consequence of that most recent ratification, the legislatures of (or conventions conducted within) at least three-fourths of the states have ratified that amendment at one time or another.

The Coleman ruling—which modified the high Court's earlier 1921 dictum in Dillon v. Gloss—held that the question of timeliness of ratification is a political and non-justiciable one, leaving the issue to the discretion of Congress. Thus it would appear that the length of time elapsing between proposal and ratification is irrelevant to the validity of the amendment. Based upon the Court's reasoning in Coleman, the Archivist of the United States proclaimed the Twenty-seventh Amendment as having been ratified when it surpassed the "three fourths of the several states" threshold for becoming a part of the Constitution. Declared ratified on May 7, 1992, it had been submitted to the states for ratification on September 25, 1789, an unprecedented time period of 202 years, 7 months and 12 days.

== Impact ==
The Coleman decision has been described as reinforcing the political question doctrine which is sometimes espoused by Federal courts in cases wherein the court deems the matter at hand to be properly assigned to the discretion of the legislative branch of the Federal government. In light of the precedent established by this case, three proposed constitutional amendments, in addition to the Child Labor Amendment, are considered to be still pending before the state legislatures (the Congressional Apportionment Amendment since 1789; the Titles of Nobility Amendment since 1810; and the Corwin Amendment since 1861), as Congress did not specify a ratification deadline when proposing them to the states.

== See also ==
- List of United States Supreme Court cases, volume 307
