= List of United States Supreme Court cases, volume 315 =

This is a list of all the United States Supreme Court cases from volume 315 of the United States Reports:

Case name	Citation	Date decided
Duncan v. Thompson	315 U.S. 1	1942
Ex parte Texas	315 U.S. 8	1942
Alton Railroad Company v. United States	315 U.S. 15	1942
Taylor v. Georgia	315 U.S. 25	1942
White v. Winchester Country Club	315 U.S. 32	1942
Merion Cricket Club v. United States	315 U.S. 42	1942
United States v. Joliet and C. Railroad Company	315 U.S. 44	1942
United States v. N.E. Rosenblum Truck Lines, Inc.	315 U.S. 50	1942
Lubetich v. United States	315 U.S. 57	1942
Glasser v. United States	315 U.S. 60	1942
Halliday v. United States	315 U.S. 94	1942
Southport Petroleum Company v. National Labor Relations Board	315 U.S. 100	1942
United States v. Wrightwood Dairy Co.	315 U.S. 110	1942
Exhibit Supply Company v. Ace Patents Corporation	315 U.S. 126	1942
Wright v. Logan	315 U.S. 139	1942
Columbia River Packers Association, Inc. v. Hinton	315 U.S. 143	1942
Cloverleaf Butter Company v. Patterson	315 U.S. 148	1942
Helvering v. Alabama Asphaltic Limestone Company	315 U.S. 179	1942
Palm Springs Holding Corporation v. Internal Revenue Service	315 U.S. 185	1942
Bondholders Comm. v. Internal Revenue Service	315 U.S. 189	1942
Helvering v. Southwestern Consolidated Corporation	315 U.S. 194	1942
United States v. Pink	315 U.S. 203	1942
Young v. United States	315 U.S. 257	1942
Great Northern Railroad Company v. United States	315 U.S. 262	1942
MacGregor v. State Mutual Life Assurance Company	315 U.S. 280	1942
National Labor Relations Board v. Automatic Maintenance Machine Company	315 U.S. 282	1942
Stewart v. Southern Railroad Company	315 U.S. 283	1942
United States v. Bethlehem Steel Corporation	315 U.S. 289	1942
Riley v. New York Trust Company	315 U.S. 343	1942
Cudahy Packing Company v. Holland	315 U.S. 357	1942
Interstate Commerce Commission v. Railway Labor Executives Association	315 U.S. 373	1942
Purcell v. United States	315 U.S. 381	1942
Williams v. Jacksonville Terminal Company	315 U.S. 386	1942
Hysler v. Florida	315 U.S. 411	1942
Hotel and Restaurant Employees v. Wisconsin Employee Relations Board	315 U.S. 437	1942
Thomson v. Gaskill	315 U.S. 442	1942
D'Oench Duhme and Company v. Federal Deposit Insurance Corporation	315 U.S. 447	1942
United States v. Carolina Freight Carriers Corporation	315 U.S. 475	1942
Howard Hall Company v. United States	315 U.S. 495	1942
Butler Brothers v. McColgan	315 U.S. 501	1942
United States v. New York	315 U.S. 510	1942
United States v. Teamsters	315 U.S. 521	1942
Pearce v. Internal Revenue Service	315 U.S. 543	1942
Stonite Products Company v. Melvin Lloyd Company	315 U.S. 561	1942
Chaplinsky v. New Hampshire	315 U.S. 568	1942
Federal Power Commission v. Natural Gas Pipeline Company	315 U.S. 575	1942
Puerto Rico v. Russell and Company	315 U.S. 610	1942
Spreckels v. Internal Revenue Service	315 U.S. 626	1942
Crancer v. Lowden	315 U.S. 631	1942
Puerto Rico v. Rubert Hermanos, Inc.	315 U.S. 637	1942
Memphis Natural Gas Company v. Beeler	315 U.S. 649	1942
Graves v. Schmidlapp	315 U.S. 657	1942
Pecheur Lozenge Company v. National Candy Company	315 U.S. 666	1942
United States Industrial Chemicals, Inc. v. Carbide and Carbon Chemical Corporation	315 U.S. 668	1942
Tulee v. Washington	315 U.S. 681	1942
National Labor Relations Board v. Electric Vacuum Cleaner Company	315 U.S. 685	1942
Miles v. Illinois Central Railroad Company	315 U.S. 698	1942
Carpenters v. Ritter's Cafe	315 U.S. 722	1942
Electrical Workers v. Wisconsin Employee Relations Board	315 U.S. 740	1942
Jacob v. City of New York	315 U.S. 752	1942
Muncie Gear Works, Inc. v. Outboard Marine and Manufacturing Company	315 U.S. 759	1942
Bakery Drivers v. Wohl	315 U.S. 769	1942
