= Orderly marketing arrangement =

An orderly marketing arrangement is a non-legal treaty agreed upon by the national government stating that a sovereign state must refrain from exporting goods to a targeted negotiating sovereign state. These agreements relate directly to voluntary export restraints, safeguard and escape clause policies. Orderly marketing arrangements are predominantly bilateral arrangements between the governments of two countries, and any change to the agreement must be approved by both parties.

== Characteristics ==
Orderly Marketing Arrangements deal directly with political tensions in importing countries with an elevating abundance of imports. A disruption in the competitive production of imports may occur when there is a sudden increase in a specific import going into a country. This would cause undesirable economic problems for the factors of production involved, therefore an orderly marketing arrangement may be implemented to deal with the spike in imports. Orderly marketing arrangements help protect against more permanent protectionist measures such as import quotas and Tariffs. These agreements are also restrictive and commonly affect prices, international relations and free trade. Protectionist strategies implemented under orderly marketing arrangements include import quotas, export-supply management, and the monitoring of trade flows. The use of orderly marketing arrangements generally span one to five years, although they may be continually extended to a length of ten years or more.

Orderly marketing arrangements also focus on the difference between binding arrangements and non-binding arrangements. Orderly marketing arrangements are included under voluntary restraint agreements; however voluntary restraint agreements may also pertain to trade agreements made between industries and governments. The Consumers Union distinguishes binding from non-binding as government to industry arrangements and government to government arrangements. The effect on domestic and international law differs depending on binding and non-binding agreements . An agreement could cause problems with domestic law but not international law or vice versa. There has been an increase in the desire of orderly marketing arrangements due to the rising pressures from the ever-changing patterns of imports and world trade, this led to orderly marketing arrangements becoming a tool for policy. If agreements are not negotiated, a more unilateral trade policy may be applied by the importing country.

Voluntary restraint agreements and orderly marketing arrangements are considered grey area measures and have been banned by the World Trade Organization since 1995. All grey area measures active at that time were terminated by 1999.

== Former orderly marketing agreements ==
The United States alone has applied orderly marketing arrangements to the import of textiles, steel, automobiles, electronics and shoes. At the end of the 1960s and early 1970s there was a marketing arrangement implemented in the steel Industry. This arrangement occurred when the United States government engaged steel industries particularly from Japan and Europe. This presented the idea of self-restraints on steel products coming into the US market. During this time, there was a letter send by steel industries from Japan and Europe to the US which presented the action plan. The Consumers Union of Kissinger states that the arrangement was not a formal operation, and was more informal than most marketing agreements. Due to this, Orderly Marketing Arrangements are strictly government to government and formal arrangements where voluntary restraint agreements are less formal. Voluntary restraint agreements are not legally binding and are used by the exporting country to avoid bigger trade problems.

== See also ==
- Escape clause
- Import
- Industry
- Protectionism
- Safeguard
- Tariff
- Voluntary export restraints
- World Trade Organization
