= United States v. Rock Royal Co-op =

- Supreme Court of the United States

Decided June 5, 1939
- Full case name: United States v. Rock Royal Co-op
- Citations: 307 U.S. 533 (more)

Holding
- The Commerce Clause allows federal regulation of milk processed and sold entirely within the state of New York because the company used a mixture of raw milk from farms within and outside the state of New York.

Court membership
- Chief Justice Charles E. Hughes Associate Justices James C. McReynolds · Pierce Butler; Harlan F. Stone · Owen Roberts; Hugo Black · Stanley F. Reed; Felix Frankfurter · William O. Douglas

Case opinions
- Majority: Reed
- Concur/dissent: Black, joined by Douglas
- Dissent: McReynolds, joined by Butler
- Dissent: Roberts

Laws applied
- Commerce Clause

United States v. Rock Royal Co-op, 307 U.S. 533 (1939), was a United States Supreme Court case in which the Court held that the Commerce Clause allows federal regulation of milk processed and sold entirely within the state of New York because the company used a mixture of raw milk from farms within and outside the state of New York.

== Significance ==
This case demonstrates the far-reaching nature of the Commerce Clause, which essentially allows Congress authority over interstate commerce that "does not differ in character or extent from that retained by the States over intrastate commerce."
