= Shipping holiday =

In United States agriculture, a shipping holiday is a fruit and vegetable marketing order feature that prohibits the commercial shipping of the regulated commodity during periods following certain holidays when demand is historically low, such as the several days after Thanksgiving and Christmas.
