= Marketing orders and agreements =

Marketing orders and agreements in United States agricultural policy allow producers to promote orderly marketing through collectively influencing the supply, demand, or price of a particular commodity. Research and promotion can be financed with pooled funds.

Marketing orders are binding on all handlers of the commodity within the geographic area of regulation once it is approved by a required number of producers (usually two-thirds). An order may limit the quantity of goods marketed, or establish the grade, size, maturity, quality, or prices of the goods. The Agricultural Marketing Service of the United States Department of Agriculture (USDA) uses marketing orders to regulate the sale of dairy products and fruits and vegetables. An order can be terminated when a majority of all producers favor its termination or when the USDA determines that the order no longer serves its intended purpose. Marketing agreements may contain more diversified provisions, but are enforceable only against those handlers who enter into the agreement.

They are authorized by the Agricultural Marketing Agreement Act of 1937 (AMAA), as amended. The AMAA was a piece of New Deal era legislation implemented for price stability and essential marketing functions in response to economic pressure faced by small farmers in the 1920s.

== Milk ==
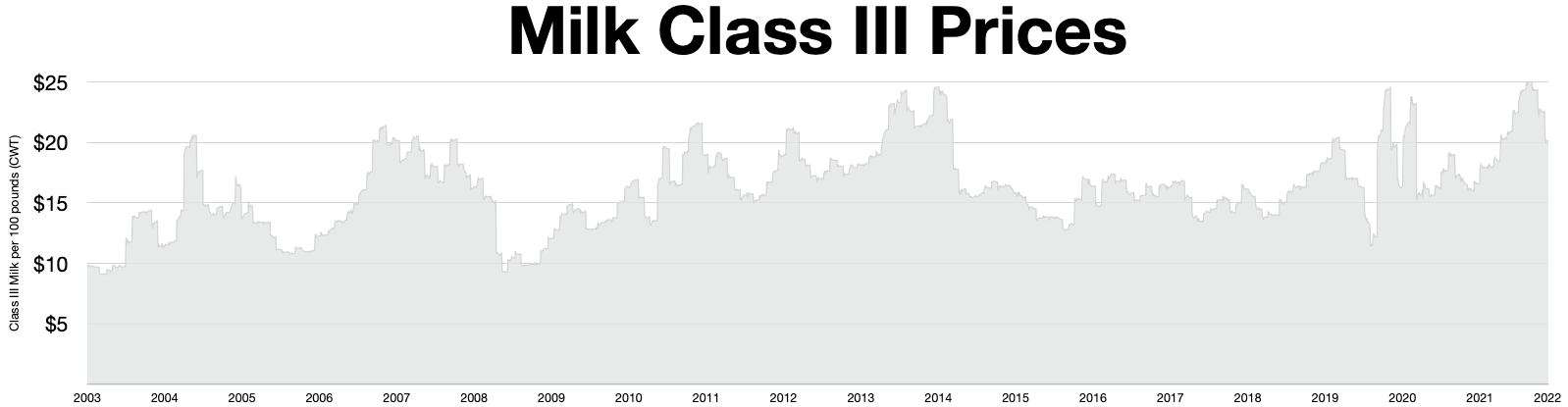
Milk class III price

Federal milk marketing orders regulate handlers that sell milk or milk products within an order region by requiring them to pay not less than an established minimum price for the Grade A milk they purchase from dairy producers, depending on how the milk is used. This classified pricing system requires handlers to pay a higher price for milk used for fluid consumption (Class I) than for milk used in manufactured dairy products such as yogurt, ice cream, cheese, butter and nonfat dry milk (Class II, Class III and Class IV products). The Federal Milk Marketing Order (FMMO) does not include certain states, such as Idaho.

Federal milk marketing orders were first instituted in the 1930s to promote orderly marketing conditions by, among other things, applying a uniform system of classified pricing throughout the farm milk market. The 1996 Farm Bill required the USDA to consolidate the number of federal milk marketing orders and to revise the method by which minimum class prices are determined. The USDA implemented these changes in 2000. There are now 10 milk marketing orders, down from 31 when the law was enacted.

== Raisins ==
The National Raisin Reserve was a raisin reserve of the United States. It was created after World War II by the government in order to control raisin prices. The reserve was run by the Raisin Administrative Committee. It was the subject of the 2013 and 2015 Supreme Court case Horne v. Department of Agriculture which found it an unconstitutional taking and ended it.

== See also ==
- Flow to market
- Marketing agreements
- Orderly marketing
- Shipping holiday
- Title 7 of the Code of Federal Regulations
- Basing point
