= Dillon v. Gloss =

- Supreme Court of the United States

Argued March 22, 1921 Decided May 16, 1921
- Full case name: Dillon v. Gloss, Deputy Collector
- Citations: 256 U.S. 368 (more) 41 S. Ct. 510; 65 L. Ed. 994; 1921 U.S. LEXIS 1612

Case history
- Prior: 262 Fed. 563

Holding
- 1. Congress may, if it chooses to, fix a reasonable time for ratification of a constitutional amendment, and a period of seven years is reasonable.; 2. A Constitutional amendment becomes a part of the Constitution upon being ratified by three-fourths of the states; thus, the Eighteenth Amendment became a part of the Constitution on January 16, 1919, and the federal legislation enacted to carry out its intent entered into force on January 16, 1920.

Court membership
- Chief Justice Edward D. White Associate Justices Joseph McKenna · Oliver W. Holmes Jr. William R. Day · Willis Van Devanter; Mahlon Pitney · James C. McReynolds; Louis Brandeis · John H. Clarke

Case opinion
- Majority: Van Devanter, joined by unanimous

Laws applied
- Article V of the Constitution
- Overruled by
- Coleman v. Miller (1939) (in part)

Dillon v. Gloss, 256 U.S. 368 (1921), was a case in which the Supreme Court of the United States held that Congress, when proposing a constitutional amendment under the authority given to it by Article V of the Constitution, may fix a definite period for its ratification, and further, that a seven-year period, such as that fixed by Congress in the resolution proposing the Eighteenth Amendment, is reasonable.

Additionally, the Court, upon taking judicial notice that the Eighteenth Amendment became a part of the Constitution on January 16, 1919, when its ratification in the state legislatures was consummated, held that the National Prohibition Act, known informally as the Volstead Act, entered into force on January 16, 1920.

== Background ==
Dillon had been arrested pursuant to the National Prohibition Act, title 2, § 3, and was in custody under § 26. He was denied his petition for a writ of habeas corpus, and appealed the denial. Dillon claimed that the Eighteenth Amendment, which Title 2 of the act was adopted to enforce, was invalid, because the Congress, in declaring that it should be inoperative unless ratified within seven years, had acted outside its constitutional authority; and, secondly, that, in any event, the law he was charged with violating, and under which he was arrested, had not gone into effect at the time of the asserted violation nor at the time of his arrest on January 17, 1920.

== Syllabus ==
1. Article V of the Constitution implies that amendments submitted thereunder must be ratified, if at all, within some reasonable time after their proposal. This was modified in 1939 by Coleman v. Miller, which ruled that proposed amendments with no specified expiration pend ratification before the States indefinitely.
2. Under Article V, Congress, in proposing an amendment, may fix a reasonable time for its ratification.
3. The period of seven years, fixed by Congress in the resolution proposing the Eighteenth Amendment was reasonable.
4. The Eighteenth Amendment became a part of the Constitution on January 16, 1919, when, as the Court notices judicially, its ratification in the state legislatures was consummated, not on January 29, 1919, when the ratification was proclaimed by the Secretary of State.
5. As the Eighteenth Amendment, by its own terms, was to go into effect one year after being ratified, §§ 3 and 26, Title II, of the National Prohibition Act, which, by § 21, Title III, were to be in force from and after the effective date of the Amendment, were in force on January 16, 1920. P. 256 U. S. 376.

The lower court's ruling was upheld.

== See also ==
- Coleman v. Miller
