= United States v. Graham =

- Court: United States District Court for the District of Maryland
- Full case name: United States of America v. Aaron Graham, and Eric Jordan
- Decided: March 1, 2012
- Docket nos.: 1:11-cr-00094
- Citation: 846 F. Supp. 2d 384 (D. Md. 2012)

Court membership
- Judge sitting: Richard D. Bennett

Keywords
- U.S. Const. Amend. IV, Stored Communications Act

United States v. Graham, 846 F. Supp. 2d 384 (D. Md. 2012), was a Maryland District Court case in which the Court held that historical cell site location data is not protected by the Fourth Amendment. Reacting to the precedent established by the recent Supreme Court case United States v. Jones in conjunction with the application of the third party doctrine, Judge Richard D. Bennett found that "information voluntarily disclosed to a third party ceases to enjoy Fourth Amendment protection" because that information no longer belongs to the consumer, but rather to the telecommunications company that handles the transmissions records. The historical cell site location data is then not subject to the privacy protections afforded by the Fourth Amendment standard of probable cause, but rather to the Stored Communications Act, which governs the voluntary or compelled disclosure of stored electronic communications records.

A three judge panel of the 4th U.S. Circuit Court of Appeals overturned the district court on the Fourth Amendment issue in August 2015, but the full court en banc upheld the district court in May 2016. Its validity has grave doubt after the Supreme Court of the United States decided Carpenter v. United States in 2018.

== Background ==
With the increase in usage of cellular phones by the public, the government turned to the exploitation of cellular phone technology to track the movements of suspects. This phenomenon led to suits by defendants who claimed that use of such technology to track their movements amounted to an invasion of their privacy.

The courts were divided over whether such tracking amounted to intruding in a person's personal sphere. Some courts decided that such tracking to obtain cell site location data implicated the Fourth Amendment, and applied the 'probable cause' standard stipulated under the Fourth Amendment to such cases- In re Application of the United States [809 F. Supp. 2d 113 (E.D.N.Y. 2011)], In re Application of the United States [747 F. Supp. 2d 827 (S.D. Tex. 2010)]. These courts however also clarified that the Fourth Amendment is not implicated if the request for acquisition of cell site location information is for a short period of time.

Other cases were decided in favor of applying the 'specific and articulable facts' standard under the Stored Communications Act since the courts believed that such acquisition of historical cell site location data did not implicate the Fourth Amendment- United States v. Dye (N.D. Ohio Apr. 27, 2011), United States v. Velasquez (N.D. Cal Oct, 22, 2010), In re Application of the United States for Historical Cell Site Data, 724 F.3d 600 (5th Cir. 2013).

== Facts ==
The Defendants, Aaron Graham and Eric Jordan, were charged for a series of armed robberies of commercial entities including a Burger King restaurant and a McDonald's restaurant in Baltimore, Maryland on February 5, 2011. Ten minutes after the McDonald's robbery, the defendants were found and arrested by the police and, upon request, provided their cell phone numbers to the officers at the scene. Two cell phones were recovered from the Defendant's car, which matched the numbers that the Defendants had provided earlier. Before Baltimore Detective Christopher Woerner searched the contents of the phones, he requested search warrants for the devices from the Circuit Court.

On March 25, 2011, Magistrate Judge Susan K. Gauvey granted the government's request to order Sprint/Nextel, Inc. to "disclose to the government 'the identification and address of cellular towers (cell site locations) related to the use of' the Defendants' cellular telephones" pursuant to the Stored Communications Act. The order requested the disclosure of geographic data for August 10–15, 2010; September 18–20, 2010; January 21–23, 2011; and February 4–5, 2011 dates important for linking the defendants to the robberies. Gauvey determined that the goal of linking the suspects to the robberies fit the standard of the government offering "specific and articulable facts." On July 15, 2011, the government was granted a second order from Magistrate Judge Paul W. Grimm for the cell site location for the period of July 1, 2010 through February 6, 2011. Spring/Nextel, Inc. provided the data to the government pursuant to this order.

On December 8, 2011, Judge Bennett of the District Court held a hearing to determine if the Cellular Phone Data and Historical Cell Site Location Data should be granted the motion to suppress at the Defendant's request.

== Court Proceedings ==
=== Defendants' Claims ===
The Defendants argued that the historical cell site location data acquired without a warrant was in violation of the Fourth Amendment because the "length of time and extent of the cellular phone monitoring intruded on the Defendants' expectation of privacy." The Defendants claimed that the data granted to the government allowed the "government to paint an intimate picture of the Defendants' whereabouts over an extensive period of time". They contended that the implications of this technology allow the government to retroactively surveil a suspect through a device he carries with him twenty-four hours a day, even to constitutionally protected places such as the home.

=== Plaintiff's Claims ===
In response to the Defendants' claims, the government argued that they lacked standing because Defendant Jordan used a fictitious name and address when subscribing to the phone service and this demonstrated a lack of privacy interest in the location records. The government also contended that the records were the proprietary business records of the cell phone carriers and that the Defendants voluntarily gave their records to the cellular service company. The government analogized the cell site location data to the pen register and used the third-party doctrine established by the Supreme Court case Smith v. Maryland to argue that the defendants had voluntarily given their information to the third party which did not implicate the Fourth Amendment based on precedent.

The government also contended that the Stored Communications Act's "lower 'specific and articulable facts' standard provides adequate privacy protections... and notwithstanding recent cases [United States v. Antoine Jones], the majority of courts have concluded that "the government's acquisition of cell site location data without a warrant does not violate the Fourth Amendment". Lastly, the government argued that, if the Court were to conclude that the acquisition of the cell site location data was unconstitutional, the appropriate remedy would not be suppression of the evidence.

== Opinion of the Court ==
=== 'Specific and Articulable Facts' Standard ===
The court reiterated that the 'specific and articulable facts' standard stipulated in the Stored Communications Act, is lower than the threshold requirement established by the 'probable cause' standard under the Fourth Amendment. The 'specific and articulable facts' standard is defined in section 2703(d) of the Act. It states that the governmental entity seeking the information must offer specific and articulable facts that "there are reasonable grounds to believe that the contents of a wire or electronic communication, or the records or other information sought, are relevant and material to an ongoing criminal investigation."

=== Expectation of Privacy ===
Regarding the government's argument about the defendant's lack of standing because of the fictitious name he used, the Court considered the issue combined with the legitimacy of the expectation of privacy in the historical cell site location data. The court cited Katz v. United States, wherein it was stated that any object that a person knowingly exposes to the public, cannot rightfully be claimed as the subject of a Fourth Amendment protection. However, anything that a person strives to protect as private, even if such object is situated in an area accessible to the public, may fall under the purview of the Fourth Amendment.

In Katz v. United States, Justice Harlan evolved a two-prong test to determine when an object may be the subject of a Fourth Amendment protection. He stated that protection may be extended to those areas where a person has a subjective expectation of privacy, and that expectation is also objectively reasonable. Justice Rehnquist reiterated this principle in Rakas v. Illinois, when he stated that a 'legitimate expectation of privacy' cannot be confined to a mere subjective expectation of something being kept private. He stated that a legitimate expectation of privacy "must have a source outside of the Fourth Amendment, either by reference to concepts of real or personal property or to understandings that are recognized and permitted by society."

The court in this case declined to consider the issue of the defendants' 'standing' separately from the issue of the legitimate expectation of privacy in the historical cell site location data. The court pronounced that the real and substantial issue to be decided in the case was whether the defendants had a legitimate expectation of privacy in the historical cell site location data or not.

=== Third Party Doctrine ===
In Katz v. United States, the Supreme Court held that the "Fourth Amendment protects people, not places. What a person knowingly exposes to the public...is not subject of Fourth Amendment protection." First the Court cited Smith v. Maryland where the Supreme Court held that "a person has no legitimate expectation of privacy in information he voluntarily turns over to third parties," and that the users of third party services are aware that they are conveying their information to the companies in order for the service to work. Using the reasoning of United States v. Miller, the Court determined that historical cell site location records were not the Defendant's private papers, but were the business records of the cellular providers. Coupling this logic with the Fourth Circuit's in United States v. Bynum, which "concluded that because Bynum voluntarily conveyed his location to his internet company, he enjoyed no reasonable expectation of privacy in that information," the Court determined that the third-party doctrine was applicable to historical cell site location information and that the Fourth Amendment was therefore not implicated.

=== Mosaic Theory ===
Next, the Court considered the question of time - if there was an exception to the third-party doctrine if the records requested were "cumulative." Judge Bennett cited multiple past orders in various districts which held that there was no Fourth Amendment violation if the request was for a concrete and short period of time. Citing the mosaic theory of the Fourth Amendment created in United States v. Maynard (the D.C. Circuit case leading to the Supreme Court United States v. Antoine Jones case), the court found that "individual investigatory steps taken by law enforcement do not amount to a Fourth Amendment violation, but when viewed in the aggregate...infringe on a person's reasonable expectations of privacy." However, Judge Bennett disagreed with this reasoning and stated that Congress expressly intended to require only "specific and articulable facts" in its enactment of the Stored Communications Act for the precise purpose that individuals do not have a legitimate expectation of privacy in information conveyed to third parties. Therefore, citing the majority opinion in U.S. v. Jones, Judge Bennett reasoned that if technology is altered in the future to intrude on the reasonable expectation of privacy, the legislature would be the body best fit to address this issue.

=== Differences from United States v. Jones ===
Because the Jones case set the Supreme Court precedent for surveillance by the government using certain electronic devices to be violations of the Fourth Amendment, Judge Bennett elucidated the distinctions between U.S. v. Jones and the case at hand. A GPS device was the issue in Jones, and Judge Bennett noted that unlike GPS information, historical cell site location data is only retroactive, not prospective - it does not give the government the ability to track the precise movements of the suspect in real time. The next difference between the two and from Smith v. Maryland that Judge Bennett noted was that historical cell site location can "only reveal which cellular towers were used to route a particular call" and therefore can only give a general location where a cell phone was used and only where the closest cellular tower was. Also, Judge Bennett separates the cases because the GPS surveillance was conducted without a valid warrant in Jones, but in this case, the Stored Communications Act had the standard of "specific and articulable facts," which enabled the judicial branch to prevent and remedy executive overreaching.

Lastly, Judge Bennett specified that the majority opinion in Jones ultimately did not consider whether the "search" in the case violated the individual's reasonable expectation of privacy and therefore, until a higher court analyzes this question or Congress comes up with a solution other than the Stored Communications Act, Judges must apply the facts of the case to the law as is currently interpreted.

=== Appropriate Remedy ===
Because the officers pursuing the historical cell site location data relied in good faith on the Stored Communications Act and the orders issued by the Magistrate Judges, the exclusionary rule does not apply as per Illinois v. Krull. There was no challenge to whether the Stored Communication Act applied to this case. Therefore, the data would still be admissible in the trial as evidence and suppression would not be an appropriate remedy.

=== Holding ===
The court held that the Fourth Amendment is not implicated in the acquisition of historical cell site location data because of the application of the third party doctrine. The court stated that such information is created and kept by third parties as part of their ordinary course of business. Judge Bennett concluded that the Defendants' Fourth Amendment rights were not violated when the government, according to the standards of the Stored Communications Act, acquired their historical cell site location data. The Defendants' Motion to Suppress Evidence of historical cell site data was therefore denied.

== Court of Appeals ==
In August 2015, a three-judge panel of the 4th U.S. Circuit Court of Appeals voted 2-1 to overturn the district court ruling that Fourth Amendment rights were not violated. "We conclude that the government's warrantless procurement of the CSLI [cell site location information] was an unreasonable search in violation of Appellants' Fourth Amendment rights. Nevertheless, because the government relied in good faith on court orders issued in accordance with Title II of the Electronic Communications Privacy Act, or the Stored Communications Act ("SCA"), we hold the court's admission of the challenged evidence must be sustained." The government asked the court to rehear the case en banc. Oral arguments in the appeal were heard March 23, 2016.

In May 2016, the full 4th U.S. Circuit Court of Appeals in Richmond, Virginia, voted 12-3 that the government can get the information without a warrant under a decades-old legal theory that it had already been disclosed to a third party, in this case a telephone company.

== Further Comments ==
Some commentators have expressed the opinion that the decision does not postulate a general rule with respect to surveillance measures through new technology. They have reflected the view that in drawing a difference between prospective and historical data, Judge Bennett may have rendered a narrow decision, which is particular to historical data.

In a subsequent case decided September 23, 2014, Judge Bennett noted that "United States v. Graham is currently on appeal to the Fourth Circuit and has been pending before that Court for nearly two years."

== See also ==
- Fourth Amendment to the United States Constitution
- Reasonable expectation of privacy
- Privacy laws of the United States
- Electronic Communications Privacy Act
- Carpenter v. United States
