= Digital Search and Seizure =

Digital Search and Seizure refers to the ability of the United States Government to obtain and read an individual's private digital correspondence and material under The Fourth Amendment of the United States Constitution.

== Reasonable Expectation of Privacy ==
The Fourth Amendment of the United States Constitution protects against unreasonable search and seizure. Originally, remote surveillance of a person's communications, such as a telephone call, was not considered search and seizure without an "actual physical invasion" of a defendant's property. However, that standard was changed by the Supreme Court in 1967 in Katz v. United States when The Court considered a case where police bugged a phone booth and listened to defendant's phone call. Instead of the Fourth Amendment protecting private spaces defined by physical boundaries, The Court defined private spaces as where there is a "reasonable expectation of privacy." Since Katz, additional case law has defined the scope of "reasonable expectation of privacy" to include cellphones and location data gathered by cellphones.

== Reasonable Expectation of Privacy on the Internet ==
To keep up with the application of the Fourth Amendment to the internet, law enforcement is taught to consider a computer or cellphone as a closed container like a file cabinet, which are protected under the Fourth Amendment. If someone gives away their computer they lose Fourth Amendment protection; unless they retain control over the computer, such as temporarily leaving it with a friend for safekeeping.

While caselaw can establish specific examples of when there is a reasonable expectation of privacy, the nature of the internet makes the application of the Fourth Amendment complicated. First, when there is a reasonable expectation of privacy is difficult to determine because internet users constantly disclose information to third parties, such as Internet Service Providers, as part of the regular functioning of the internet. Second, ISPs are required to turn over records by a court order such as a subpoena. Subpoenas do not have the same threshold of probable cause as required by search warrants under the Fourth Amendment. Lastly, ISPs are generally private entities, therefore they can voluntarily search their users records and voluntarily turn them over to the government without violating the Fourth Amendment.

== Legal Protections ==
However, there are federal laws that apply Fourth Amendment principles to the internet age. One such law is the Stored Communications Act which protects against search and seizure of digital information stored in memory. A search warrant is required to obtain the contents of an unread electronic communication that has been in storage for 180 days or less. A search warrant, a subpoena with notice, or court order meeting certain specifications is required to obtain the contents of an unread electronic communication in storage for more than 180 days, or a read electronic communication.

Additionally, a network provider may not voluntarily disclose the content of an electronic communication except when: (1) disclosure is to the intended recipient or (2) someone who needs the information to send the data to the intended recipient, (3) the originator gives consent, (4) the provider needs to protect its interests (i.e. in case of a data breach), (5) the content contains child pornography, (6) the provider accidentally discovers evidence to a crime, (7) there is a serious emergency, or (8) otherwise provided by law. There are no federal regulations governing electronic search and seizure, but the FCC requires international common carriers to make their communications with parties in the United States in a form that subjects them to the Stored Communications Act, the Wiretap Act, and the Pen Register and Trap and Trace Statute.
