= United States v. Davis (2014) =

U.S. federal criminal case

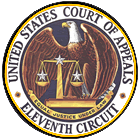
- Court: United States Court of Appeals for the Eleventh Circuit
- Full case name: United States v. Quartavious Davis
- Decided: May 5, 2015
- Citation: No. 12-12928; 785 F.3d 498 (11th Cir. 2015)

Case history
- Prior history: Mot. to suppress denied, D.C. Docket No. 1:10-cr-20896-JAL-2; Affirmed, 754 F.3d 1205 (11th Cir.); rehearing en banc granted, opinion vacated, 573 F. App'x 925 (11th Cir. 2014)
- Appealed from: United States District Court for the Southern District of Florida
- Subsequent history: Cert. denied, Supreme Court

United States v. Quartavious Davis is a United States federal legal case that challenged the use in a criminal trial of location data obtained without a search warrant from MetroPCS, a cell phone service provider. Mobile phone tracking data had helped place the defendant in this case at the scene of several crimes, for which he was convicted. The defendant appealed to the Eleventh Circuit Court of Appeals, which found the warrantless data collection had violated his constitutional rights under the Fourth Amendment to the United States Constitution, but declined to order a new trial because the evidence was collected in good faith. The Eleventh Circuit has since vacated this decision pending a rehearing by the Eleventh Circuit en banc. United States v. Davis, 573 Fed. Appx. 925 (11th Cir. 2014). On 5 May 2015, the en banc order upheld the use of the information. On 9th Nov 2015, the Supreme Court of the United States declined to hear this case on appeal.

Quartavious Davis, on trial with five co-defendants, was convicted on several counts of Hobbs Act robbery, conspiracy, and knowing possession of a firearm in furtherance of a crime of violence and sentenced to over 161 years in prison. He appealed on several grounds, principally arguing that the court admitted stored cell site location information obtained without a warrant, in violation of his Fourth Amendment rights. The government had obtained the data under a provision of the Stored Communications Act that only requires showing "that there are reasonable grounds to believe that the... records or other information sought, are relevant and material to an ongoing criminal investigation." (18 U.S.C. § 2703(d)). That provision does not require showing probable cause, which would have been needed for a warrant.

== Eleventh Circuit ruling ==
The Circuit Court largely relied on precedent set in Smith v. Maryland and U.S. v. Miller, which established the Third Party Doctrine.

By relying on this precedent, the court said that Davis had no reasonable expectation of privacy in his Cell Site Location Data, as it did not meet the two questions put forth in Katz to establish reasonable expectation. First, has the individual manifested a subjective expectation of privacy in the object of the challenged search? Second, is society willing to recognize that expectation as reasonable?

18 U.S.C. § 2703(d) Contains a provision that allows for the collection of data like that used in this case via a special court order, often referred to as a "D-order". These orders allow for the collection of more data than a subpoena would, but less than a warrant. As a tradeoff, these "D-orders" require less than probable cause to obtain.

Because of its perceived similarity to Miller and Smith, the court declared, "Based on the SCA and governing Supreme Court precedent, we too conclude the government's obtaining a § 2703(d) court order for the production of MetroPCS's business records did not violate the Fourth Amendment" and "Davis can assert neither ownership nor possession of the third-party's business records he sought to suppress".

== Background ==
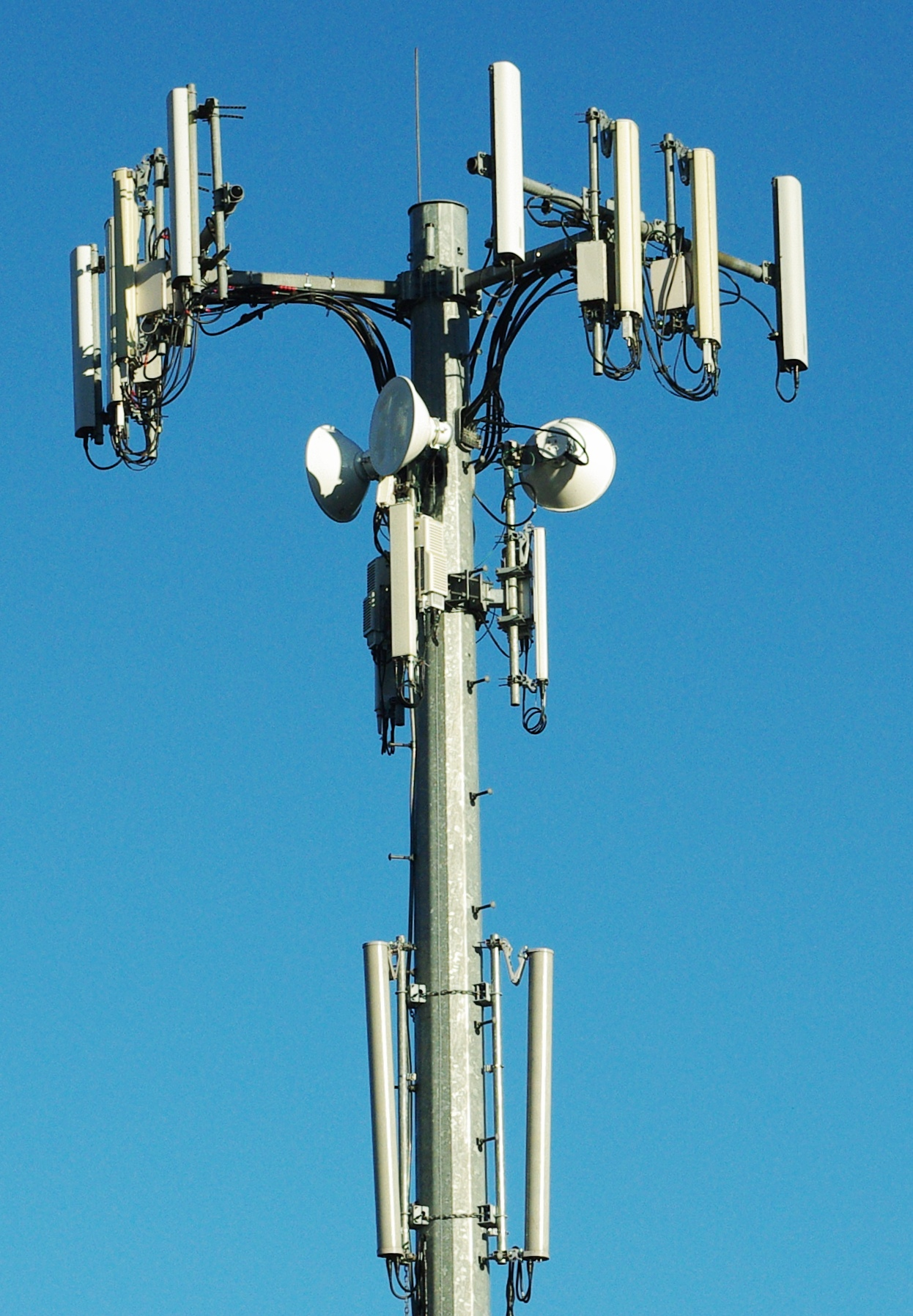
Typical cell site antennas

Cellular telephones make optimal use of limited radio spectrum and their short transmission range, due to low power, by always connecting to a radio antenna at a nearby facility, known as a cell site. These facilities are typically on a tower or tall building and the cellular service provider places many such cell sites in an urban area to cover the needs of its customers. As a cell phone caller moves, their connection is automatically handed-off to another cell site that is close by, as needed. Even when a call is not in progress, each cell phone reports changes in location to allow incoming calls to be routed to it. Service providers record each site a user connects with, along with the time of connection. This information can be used to track a cell phone user's movements throughout the day.^{[p.18]}

The government attempted to distinguish cell phone tracking by pointing out that it has long been established that telephone users do not have an expectation of privacy in the numbers they call. The 11th Circuit noted that while phone users realize they are giving the phone company the number of the person that they are calling, they are not generally aware that they are being tracked. In support it cited an argument made by the prosecutor to the jury that the defendants "probably had no idea that by bringing their cell phones with them to these robberies, they were allowing [their cell service provider] and now all of you to follow their movements on the days and at the times of the robberies [...]"^{[p. 22]}

The 11th Circuit held "that cell site location information is within the subscriber's reasonable expectation of privacy. The obtaining of that data without a warrant is a Fourth Amendment violation." Despite finding that the evidence was obtained in an unconstitutional manner, the court denied "appellant's motion to exclude the fruits of that electronic search and seizure under the 'good faith' exception to the exclusionary rule recognized in United States v. Leon," noting that the data was obtained under a court order, though not a warrant.^{[p. 23 ff.]}

== See also ==
- Carpenter v. United States – Supreme Court ruling that the Government's acquisition of a weeks worth of cell-site records is a Fourth Amendment search.
- Riley v. California - subsequent Supreme Court ruling that warrantless search and seizure of the digital contents of a cell phone during an arrest is unconstitutional
