= United States v. Gratkowski =

United States court case

- Court: United States Court of Appeals for the Fifth Circuit
- Full case name: United States of America v. Richard Nikolai Gratkowski
- Docket nos.: 19-50492
- Citation: 964 F.3d 307 (5th Cir. 2020)

Holding
- Much like bank records, the privacy of Bitcoin transactions should be judged by the third party doctrine.

Court membership
- Judges sitting: Carl E. Stewart, James L. Dennis, and Catharina Haynes

Laws applied
- Fourth Amendment of the Constitution of the United States; Bank Secrecy Act; Child Pornography Prevention Act of 1996 (18 U.S. Code § 2252A)

Keywords
- Fourth Amendment, Bitcoin, Coinbase, Child pornography, Right to privacy

United States v. Gratkowski, (Note: Text of U.S. Court of Appeals for the Fifth Circuit, United States of America v. Richard Nikolai Gratkowski, 964 Federal Reporter 307 (2020) is available from: Justia) 964 F.3d 307 (5th Cir. 2020), was a case in the United States Court of Appeals for the Fifth Circuit involving the Fourth Amendment implications of Bitcoin transactions.

The case centered around Richard Nikolai Gratkowski, who was charged with one count of receiving child pornography and one count of accessing websites with intent to view child pornography. The evidence against Gratkowski was obtained through a search warrant that was based on information gleaned from an analysis of Bitcoin transactions on the blockchain and customer data from the virtual currency exchange Coinbase.

Gratkowski was the first time the question of blockchain data privacy rights came before a federal court.

== Background ==
In 2016, Gratkowski was implicated in a Project Safe Childhood federal investigation involving the receipt of child pornography via a website on the Tor network. Federal agents discovered that the user had paid for access to the illicit material with Bitcoin. They obtained information about the Bitcoin transactions from the blockchain, which led them to Coinbase, who, after being served with a grand jury subpoena, identified former U.S. Immigration and Customs Enforcement Homeland Security Investigations agent Richard Nikolai Gratkowski as the source of the funds.

== Procedural history ==
Gratkowski was charged in the United States District Court for the Western District of Texas for violating the Child Pornography Prevention Act of 1996 (18 U.S. Code § 2252A). He moved to suppress the evidence, arguing that the government's investigation violated his Fourth Amendment rights. The district court denied the motion, ruling that there is no reasonable expectation of privacy in Bitcoin transaction records.

After accepting a plea agreement in which he reserved the right to appeal the Fourth Amendment issue, and being sentenced to a seventy-month prison term, Gratkowski appealed to the United States Court of Appeals for the Fifth Circuit.

== Ruling ==
The Fifth Circuit analyzed whether Bitcoin transaction records are protected by the Fourth Amendment. The court likened Bitcoin transactions to bank records, which are not protected by the Fourth Amendment under the third-party doctrine. This doctrine holds that a person has no legitimate expectation of privacy in information voluntarily disclosed to third parties. The court ruled that Gratkowski voluntarily disclosed information about his Bitcoin transactions to third parties (i.e., all users globally of the Bitcoin network and Coinbase), and therefore he had no reasonable expectation of privacy in this information. Affirming the district court's denial of Gratkowski's motion to suppress the evidence, the court ruled that there is no reasonable expectation of privacy in Bitcoin transaction records on the blockchain or held by a third-party exchange like Coinbase, thus such records are not protected by the Fourth Amendment.

The case was decided by a panel consisting of Circuit Judges Carl E. Stewart, James L. Dennis, and Catharina Haynes, with Judge Haynes delivering the opinion of the court.

== See also ==
- Carpenter v. United States (2018)
- Kyllo v. United States (2001)
- Smith v. Maryland (1979)
- United States v. Miller (1976)
