= Stingray use in United States law enforcement =

Investigative technique used in the U.S.

The use of stingrays by United States law enforcement is an investigative technique used by both federal and local law enforcement in the United States to obtain information from cell phones by mimicking a cell phone tower. The devices which accomplish this are generically known as IMSI-catchers, but are commonly called stingrays, a brand sold by the Harris Corporation.

== History ==
The United States Federal government has had access to stingray-type technology since at least 1995. The Baltimore Police Department began using the devices in 2007. The New York City Police Department has used the devices since 2008.

Initially, the use of stingray phone trackers was a secret, due to a number of non-disclosure agreements between individual police departments and the Federal Bureau of Investigation. According to the American Civil Liberties Union, the FBI entered into agreements with at least 48 police departments in the United States. In these agreements, the FBI allowed police departments to use the stingrays, while requiring police departments provide no information to either the public or the courts regarding the devices' operation or existence.

In December 2012, the Electronic Privacy Information Center released documents which show the United States Department of Justice discussing the use of cell phone tracking equipment, including addressing unlawful interference concerns. More info on stingrays was obtained in March 2013, when the American Civil Liberties Union released documents it obtained via a Freedom of Information Act request. Stingray devices have been used in a variety of criminal investigations, from murder and kidnapping to misdemeanor theft.

The way law enforcement use stingrays has been criticized by a number of civil liberties groups, who have filed lawsuits against current practices.

Baltimore, Maryland has a much higher use of stingrays compared to other large cities, like Boston, New York City and San Diego. According to a member of the Baltimore Police Department, the agency used stingrays 4,300 times between 2007 and 2015.

== Legal issues ==
=== Federal government ===
The official position of the US Federal government is that the use of stingrays does not require a probable cause warrant, because they claim stingrays are a kind of pen register tap, which does not require a warrant, as decided in Smith v. Maryland. The government notes that they do not intercept the actual conversation, only tracking identity of the phone and its location. The devices do have the technical capability to record the content of calls, so the government requires these content-intercepting functions to be disabled in normal use. In September 2015, the US Justice Department issued new guidelines requiring federal agents to obtain warrants before using stingray devices, except in exigent circumstances.

=== State governments ===
In 2015, the Commonwealth of Virginia passed a law requiring the use of a warrant when using a stingray, and Washington state passed a similar law. In addition, California, Minnesota and Utah have also passed laws requiring warrants for stingray use.

== Legal cases ==
In 2011, in the case of Daniel David Rigmaiden in the U.S. District Court of Arizona, the chief of the FBI Tracking Technology Unit wrote an affidavit defending the use of an unspecified pen register device. Information about the model or function was purposefully withheld, citing FBI policy; the letter assured the court that the device was legally compliant. A widely cited story released by the Wall Street Journal described the device as a "stingray", along with basic information about how it worked. Much of the info on stingray devices was provided by Rigmaiden himself, who looked for how authorities had discovered he was committing tax fraud.

In January 2016, in the case of United States v. Patrick, the Seventh Circuit Court of Appeals, upheld the warrantless use of a stingray to locate the suspect.

On March 30, 2016, the Maryland Court of Special Appeals ruled in Maryland v. Andrews that a warrant is required for using a stingray. This led to the suppression of evidence for alleged attempted murder by Andrews.

On April 25, 2016, the Baltimore City Circuit Court suppressed evidence collected using a stingray in the trial of alleged murder suspect Robert Copes. The police had obtained authorization to use a pen register, but the court ruled that it was insufficient and they needed a probable cause warrant.

On July 12, 2016, the U.S. District Court of Southern New York ruled in United States v. Lambis that using a stingray constitutes a search that requires a warrant and suppressed the evidence gathered from its use.

On August 16, 2016, a complaint was filed to the Federal Communications Commission by the Center for Media Justice, Color of Change, and Open Technology Institute regarding the use of stingrays by the Baltimore Police Department. The complaint alleged that the department had been operating stingrays without proper licensing and asked the FCC to intervene. The complaint further claimed that use of the device, which can disrupt cell networks, disproportionately affected African-American neighborhoods in Baltimore. The stingray had been used by Baltimore police thousands of times during investigations ranging from theft to violent crimes.

On August 24, 2017, the U.S. District Court of Northern California ruled in United States v. Ellis that the use of a stingray constituted a search that requires a warrant, but did not suppress the evidence based on exigent circumstances and good faith exception.

On September 21, 2017, the D.C. Court of Appeals ruled in Prince Jones v. United States that using a stingray requires a warrant.

On November 3, 2017, the New York Supreme Court in Brooklyn ruled in People v. Gordon that using a stingray constitutes a search, thus requiring a warrant separate from a pen register/trap and trace order.

On July 18, 2018, the U.S. District Court of Northern California ruled in United States v. Artis that the evidence obtained from a stingray device must be suppressed due to deficiencies in the warrants obtained by the Federal agents.

On September 5, 2018, the Florida Fourth District Court of Appeal issued two rulings. In the first, Florida v. Sylvestre, it affirmed the lower court's suppression of evidence obtained from the warrantless use of a stingray because it is unconstitutional. In the second case, Ferrari v. Florida, it reversed the lower court's refusal to suppress evidence obtained from warrantless cell-site location information.

On October 1, 2020, the Solano County Superior Court tentatively ruled in Oakland Privacy, et al. v. City of Vallejo that the city and its law enforcement could not use stingray or any "cellular communications technology," because it bypassed city government code that requires public discussion, voting, and a city council ordinance or resolution on such technology usage and related privacy policy. The city had allowed its police department to create privacy policy on the use of stingray.

== See also ==
- United States v. Davis (2014)
