= In re Application of the United States for Historical Cell Site Data =

- Court: United States Court of Appeals for the Fifth Circuit
- Decided: July 30, 2013
- Citation: 724 F.3d 600

Holding
- Court orders under the Stored Communications Act compelling cell phone service providers to disclose historical cell site location information are not per se unconstitutional.

Court membership
- Judges sitting: Thomas Morrow Reavley, James L. Dennis, Edith Brown Clement

Case opinions
- Majority: Edith Brown Clement, joined by Thomas Morrow Reavley
- Dissent: James L. Dennis

Laws applied
- Stored Communications Act (18 U.S.C. § 2703(d)), Fourth Amendment to the United States Constitution

In re Application of the United States for Historical Cell Site Data, 724 F.3d 600 (5th Cir. 2013), was a case in which the United States Court of Appeals for the Fifth Circuit held that the government can access cell site records without a warrant. Specifically, the court held that court orders under the Stored Communications Act compelling cell phone providers to disclose historical cell site information are not per se unconstitutional.

Section 2703(d) of the Stored Communications Act allows law enforcement agents to obtain court orders for cell site information without a warrant. Privacy advocates argued that the Act was unconstitutional because it violated callers' reasonable expectation of privacy under the Fourth Amendment. The court held that cell site information is a "business record" that callers voluntarily convey to their phone service providers. Since information voluntarily conveyed to third parties receives weaker protection under the Fourth Amendment (the third-party doctrine), the court held that section 2703(d) of the Stored Communications Act is not per se unconstitutional.

The New York Times called the case "a significant victory for law enforcement." The Electronic Frontier Foundation wrote that the opinion was based on a "misguided belief that a user understands and voluntarily chooses to reveal their location to the cell phone provider and ultimately the government through the user's own free will."

== Background ==
=== Facts ===
In early October 2010, law enforcement agents in Texas applied for three court orders under section 2703(d) of the Stored Communications Act, seeking to compel cell phone service providers to disclose cell site information for three phones for the past 60 days. According to the district court:

Among other things, each application sought "records or other information pertaining to subscriber(s) or customer(s), including historical cell site information and call detail records (including any two-way radio feature mode) for the sixty (60) days prior to the date the Order is signed by the Court (but not including the contents of communications)." Each application identically defined the requested information as "the antenna tower and sector to which the cell phone sends its signal," specifically including "the cellsite/sector(s) used by the mobile telephone to obtain service for a call or when in an idle state." In other words, the Government seeks continuous location data to track the target phone over a two-month period, whether the phone was in active use or not.

=== Procedural history ===
Magistrate Judge Stephen William Smith of United States District Court for the Southern District of Texas issued an opinion on October 29, 2010 denying the government's applications on the grounds that such a disclosure violates the Fourth Amendment.

The district court adopted the magistrate judge's decision in a single-page ruling on November 11, 2011, stating "the standard under the Stored Communications Act, 18 U.S.C. §2703(d), is below that required by the Constitution".

The United States Court of Appeals for the Fifth Circuit reversed the district court in an opinion issued on July 30, 2013.

=== District court opinion ===
The district court held that compelled disclosure of cell site information violates the Fourth Amendment.

The opinion began by noting that the court has typically granted similar government requests for historical cell site information. "However," the court noted, "recent months have brought to light important developments in both technology and caselaw raising serious constitutional doubts about such rulings." In particular, the court pointed to United States v. Maynard, which held that constitutionally unprotected location data can receive protection when aggregated over time. The court also cited an opinion from the United States Court of Appeals for the Third Circuit directing a lower court to determine whether cell site records could encroach upon citizens' reasonable expectations of privacy.

Next, the opinion surveyed recent developments in cell phone technology. It noted that in 2010, when the opinion was published, there were over 251,000 cell sites in the U.S., compared to just 913 in 1986, the year the Stored Communications Act became law. The court pointed out that "knowing the base station (or sector ID) is tantamount to knowing the user's location to within a relatively small geographic area." The court found that the differences in accuracy between GPS location data and cell site data are "increasingly obsolete, and will soon be effectively meaningless."

The court reached three legal conclusions. First, it held that cell site information reveals non-public information about constitutionally protected spaces. Specifically, it held that cell site information could reveal whether an item or a person was in an individual's home at a particular time, which the Supreme Court held in United States v. Karo to be protected under the Fourth Amendment.

Second, it held that Fourth Amendment protections apply to cell site information because it can reveal sensitive personal information over time. The court based this ruling on United States v. Maynard, in which the United States Court of Appeals for the District of Columbia Circuit held that "[p]rolonged surveillance reveals types of information not revealed by short-term surveillance, such as what a person does repeatedly, what he does not do, and what he does ensemble." (The Supreme Court later affirmed Maynard on narrower grounds in United States v. Jones, 565 U.S. 400 (2012).)

Third, it held that users do not voluntarily convey cell site information to their mobile providers. The government argued that cell site information is not entitled to Fourth Amendment protections, citing Supreme Court cases holding that law enforcement does not need a warrant to access information voluntarily disclosed to third parties. The court disagreed, holding that cell phone users' disclosure of location information is "unknowing" and "inadvertent."

== Fifth Circuit opinion ==
The United States Court of Appeals for the Fifth Circuit reversed the district court, holding that cell site information is not constitutionally protected because callers voluntarily convey the data to their mobile providers.

First, the court addressed whether the magistrate judge had discretion to require the government to seek a warrant. The ACLU (in an amicus brief filed jointly with the EFF) argued that Section 2703(d) of the Stored Communications Act gives magistrate judges the authority to require the government to obtain a warrant to obtain historical cell site information. Section 2703(d) states than an order "shall issue only if the governmental entity offers specific and articulable facts showing that there are reasonable grounds to believe that the contents of a wire or electronic communication, or the records or other information sought, are relevant and material to an ongoing criminal investigation." Relying on a Third Circuit opinion reaching the same conclusion, the ACLU argued that the phrase "only if" created a necessary but not a sufficient condition for the court to issue an order. In other words, if the government shows "specific and articulable facts," a judge may issue an order, but she may also decide to require a warrant.

However, the Fifth Circuit here disagreed with the ACLU's reading of the statute. Under the court's interpretation, the word "shall" is "the language of command." The court held that "the 'shall issue' term directs the court to issue the order if all the necessary conditions in the statute are met" (emphasis added). Thus a magistrate judge must issue an order for cell site information if the government meets the "specific and articulable facts" standard. "If these three conditions are met," the Fifth Circuit held, "the court does not have the discretion to refuse to grant the order."

Moreover, the court held even if the ACLU's argument were correct, the issue of magistrate judges' discretion "would be beside the point here." The lower court held that "all § 2703(d) orders for cell site information were unconstitutional". Thus the court here was forced to confront whether 2703(d) orders are constitutional.

The ACLU's argument focused on the potential of cell site data to reveal sensitive information about a person's location. It argued that cell site data information can track people while they are inside their homes, which the Supreme Court has held to be a constitutionally protected space. It also cited five justices' concurring opinions in United States v. Jones, which suggested that higher constitutional protections might apply to location information aggregated over time.

In contrast, the government's argument focused on who is gathering the data. It argued that the government itself does not collect cell site location data. Rather, cell phone users generate this data in the course of doing business with their phone service providers. Several Supreme Court opinions have established that the Fourth Amendment does not protect so-called "business records." Since the information is not constitutionally protected, the government argued that it does not need a warrant to compel phone companies to turn over the data to investigators.

The court held that "cell site information is clearly a business record." The data is the result of a business transaction between the caller and the phone company. The ACLU nonetheless argued that callers do not voluntarily convey location information. The government disagreed, arguing that phone users are aware that location information may be transmitted to their phone company when they place calls. The court agreed with the government:

Because a cell phone user makes a choice to get a phone, to select a particular service provider, and to make a call, and because he knows that the call conveys cell site information, the provider retains this information, and the provider will turn it over to the police if they have a court order, he voluntarily conveys his cell site data each time he makes a call.

In conclusion, the court held that "Section 2703(d) orders to obtain historical cell site information for specified cell phones at the points at which the user places and terminates a call are not categorically unconstitutional. It did not rule on other forms of mobile location tracking, like GPS tracking or the collection of data from all phones using a given cell tower.

== Subsequent developments ==
The Massachusetts Supreme Judicial Court disagreed with the Fifth Circuit's ruling in this case. In Commonwealth v. Augustine, the court concluded "that although the CSLI [Cell Site Location Information] at issue here is a business record of the defendant's cellular service provider, he had a reasonable expectation of privacy in it," and therefore the government must seek a warrant to obtain long term cell site data. The court recognized that "GPS data and historical CSLI are linked at a fundamental level", as they both implicate a person's reasonable expectation of privacy in the same manner, by tracking the person's movements. The court decided that tracking a person's location in the urban Boston area for two weeks was "more than sufficient to intrude upon the defendant's expectation of privacy safeguarded by art." The court did not consider what the time boundaries are for such an order to not implicate a person's reasonable privacy interest.

== See also ==
- Carpenter v. United States – Supreme Court ruling that the Government's acquisition of a week's worth of cell-site records is a Fourth Amendment search.
