= Chatrie v. United States =

- Supreme Court of the United States

Argued April 27, 2026 Decided June 29, 2026
- Full case name: Okello T. Chatrie, Petitioner v. United States
- Docket no.: 25-112
- Citations: 609 U.S. 605 (more) 146 S.Ct. 2193
- Argument: Oral argument
- Decision: Opinion

Case history
- Prior: Motion to suppress denied. United States v. Chatrie, 590 F. Supp. 3d 901 (E.D. Va. 2022).; Affirmed. United States v. Chatrie, 107 F. 4th 319 (4th Cir. 2024).; Affirmed on rehearing. United States v. Chatrie, 136 F. 4th 100 (4th Cir. 2025) (en banc).; Cert. granted. 607 U.S. ___ (2026).

Questions presented
- 1. Whether the execution of the geofence warrant violated the Fourth Amendment.; 2. Whether the exclusionary rule should apply to the evidence derived from the geofence warrant.

Holding
- Police officers conducted a Fourth Amendment search when they acquired Chatrie’s location data from Google because an individual has a reasonable expectation of privacy in his cell-phone location information.

Court membership
- Chief Justice John Roberts Associate Justices Clarence Thomas · Samuel Alito; Sonia Sotomayor · Elena Kagan; Neil Gorsuch · Brett Kavanaugh; Amy Coney Barrett · Ketanji Brown Jackson

Case opinions
- Majority: Kagan, joined by Roberts, Sotomayor, Kavanaugh, Jackson
- Concurrence: Jackson, joined by Sotomayor
- Concurrence: Gorsuch (in judgment)
- Dissent: Alito, joined by Thomas, Barrett
- Dissent: Barrett

Laws applied
- U.S. Const. amend. IV

Chatrie v. United States, 609 U.S. 605 (2026), is a United States Supreme Court case holding that a geofence warrant is a search subject to warrant procedures of the Fourth Amendment to the United States Constitution. Chatrie reaffirmed and expanded the Court's holding in the landmark 2018 case Carpenter v. United States, which held that government entities violate the Fourth Amendment when accessing historical location data for cellular phone records without a proper search warrant.

== Background ==
=== Geofence warrants ===
A geofence warrant is a law enforcement technique used to identify all cell phones present within a physical area at a particular time, and is a form of reverse search. The warrant makes use of technology companies' practice of collecting granular user location information. The law enforcement agency seeking the warrant directs it toward a technology company, and identifies a geofence (a virtual "fence" around a geographic location) along with a specific period of time to be searched.

=== Third-party doctrine ===
Before the 2018 Supreme Court ruling in Carpenter v. United States, telecommunications data held by a service provider was not protected by the Fourth Amendment's warrant requirements under a legal theory known as the third-party doctrine. Carpenter created a narrow exception to the third-party doctrine for cell site location information (CSLI), a particular type of location data collected by wireless carriers when a phone connects to a cell tower. While CSLI can provide precise location information in places with many nearby cellular towers, geofence data is generally far more precise. CSLI can show where a cell phone is physically present within a range as small as one-eighth of a mile, whereas geofence data can pinpoint a phone's location with just twenty meters. Unlike CSLI, geofence data uses GPS pings, as well as Wi-Fi and Bluetooth connections. Hence, the courts tried to determine if the third-party doctrine applied to the more precise data at issue in the Chatrie case.

== Case history ==
On May 20, 2019, a bank was robbed in Midlothian, Virginia. Over the coming weeks, the investigation stalled. On June 14, local law enforcement applied for and received a geofence warrant issued to Google. The warrant requested information on cellular devices within a geofence area targeted at the bank and within a 150-meter radius. The area encompassed was large enough to collect information from a nearby church. The police's geofence warrant requested two hours of location history information.

The police and Google followed a three-step process to determine the extent of data to be collected. First, the warrant requested anonymized information on all user accounts within the geofence between 4:20pm and 5:20pm on the day of the robbery. Second, after reviewing such information, law enforcement would attempt to narrow down their list of possible suspects. They would then return to Google and seek all information on users from the narrowed list, between 3:50pm and 5:50pm (for an additional 30 minutes on each end of the original time period) regardless of whether they were inside or outside of the geofence area. Finally, after reviewing the second batch of information, law enforcement would again narrow the list of persons of interest and return to Google, at which point the remaining accounts would be linked to identifiable users. Google provided the names, phone numbers, and email addresses of all users identified in the final step of the warrant procedure. Okello Chatrie was among the three final users, and was determined to be a suspect in the bank robbery.

== Lower court rulings ==
=== District court ruling ===
Chatrie was indicted in the United States District Court for the Eastern District of Virginia on robbery and firearms charges. He moved to suppress the results of the geofence warrant, but this request was denied by the court after extensive fact-finding. Despite finding both that a search occurred and that the warrant violated the particularity and probable cause requirements of the Fourth Amendment, the court found that the evidence was nevertheless admissible under the good-faith exception to the exclusionary rule, meaning that the police acted reasonably given the uncertainties raised by the newest types of surveillance technologies. Chatrie entered a conditional guilty plea for the criminal charges against him, reserving the right to appeal the denial of his motion to suppress the evidence. Chatrie subsequently exercised that right and appealed his conviction at the Fourth Circuit Court of Appeals.

=== Appeals court ruling ===
The Fourth Circuit affirmed Chatrie's conviction, on the grounds that he did not have a reasonable expectation of privacy towards his cellular location data because he had used Google services voluntarily. That determination was in turn supported by the 1979 Supreme Court precedent Smith v. Maryland. In a dissenting opinion, Judge James Andrew Wynn concluded that the government violated Chatrie's reasonable expectation of privacy under the more recent Carpenter precedent, which addressed more intrusive and precise technologies.

Chatrie requested an en banc rehearing before all 15 members of the Fourth Circuit. The panel upheld Chatrie's criminal conviction and again denied his request to suppress the geofence data, as had been done in the original Fourth Circuit ruling and in the district court ruling. However, the en banc ruling revealed a significant amount of disagreement among the panel of judges. First, Chief Judge Albert Diaz offered no opinion of any kind. The remaining 14 judges split 7-7 on whether obtaining geofence data collection qualifies as a search per the requirements of the Fourth Amendment.

Seven judges concluded, in an opinion written by Judge Julius N. Richardson, that no Fourth Amendment search occurred because Chatrie lacked a "reasonable expectation of privacy in two hours' worth of Location History data voluntarily exposed to Google." Seven other judges, in an opinion written by Judge Wynn, concluded that a Fourth Amendment search had occurred, reasoning that the government had "invaded [Chatrie's] reasonable expectation of privacy" in accessing his data, an expectation that the third-party doctrine was “wholly inadequate” to address. Within the latter group of judges, five opined further that the police's original warrant request was not supported by probable cause, though only one of those, Judge Roger Gregory, called for the evidence against Chatrie to be suppressed.

Chatrie appealed the Fourth Circuit decision to the United States Supreme Court.

== Supreme Court ruling ==
On July 28, 2025, Chatrie petitioned the Supreme Court for a writ of certiorari. On January 16, 2026, the court granted review, but determined that it would only address the matter of reasonable expectation of privacy in geofence data, and would not address the exclusionary rule on whether the criminal evidence against Chatrie should be suppressed. Oral arguments were heard on April 27, 2026. The case was argued by Adam Unikowsky on behalf of Chatrie and Eric Feigin on behalf of the United States.

On June 29, 2026, in an opinion written by Justice Elena Kagan, the Supreme Court held 6-3 that the police conducted a Fourth Amendment search when they obtained Chatrie's location information from Google because individuals have reasonable expectations of privacy in their cell phone location information. The court did not hold that geofence warrants are unconstitutional, but did hold that a search occurs when law enforcement accesses location data from an individual's cell phone. Because such access constitutes a search, the Fourth Amendment requires law enforcement to demonstrate probable cause and consider reasonable expectations of privacy prior to demanding such data from technology companies, regardless of the duration of information sought.

Thus, the Supreme Court vacated Chatrie's criminal conviction, and remanded the case back to the Fourth Circuit to determine if the case against Chatrie could continue, if questions about the good-faith exception and the exclusionary rule could be resolved.

Justices Sonia Sotomayor and Ketanji Brown Jackson concurred in the judgment, but added that they would have declared the geofence warrant at issue to be invalid because it failed to meet the particularity and probable cause requirements for search warrants.

=== Dissenting opinions ===
Justice Samuel Alito issued a dissent, opining that per precedent, Chatrie had surrendered his cellular information voluntarily by using Google's network services, and a police search of that information was reasonable under the requirements of the Fourth Amendment. Alito also argued that the Chatrie ruling added uncertainty to what he believed was the precise data-specific procedure that had been mapped out in the Carpenter ruling in 2018. Alito further objected on procedural grounds, arguing that the Supreme Court should not have taken the case because the ultimate outcome of Chatrie's criminal case was unlikely to change given the good-faith exception toward Fourth Amendment procedures that were unclear at the time of the warrant request. Justice Amy Coney Barrett also issued a short dissenting opinion stating her agreement with Alito.

== Impact and subsequent developments ==
Legal commentators largely praised the Supreme Court's Chatrie ruling for addressing the privacy intrusions of the latest surveillance technologies, but also noted that the ruling would create uncertainty for any future dispute in which yet another new technology may be at issue. Commentators noted that the ruling revamped to fight over digital privacy by focusing on current technologies rather than old procedural precedents, but concluded the ruling also enabled use of the good-faith exception if future police determine that procedures for each new technology are unclear. The American Civil Liberties Union praised the ruling for addressing "overbroad" surveillance which should enable pro-privacy arguments against future technologies.

Surveillance law expert Christopher Slobogin praised the ruling for weakening the third-party doctrine, which is still supported by precedents dating back to the 1970s when far less intrusive telecommunications technologies were extant. Matthew Tokson of the University of Utah praised the Supreme Court for instituting a technology-based technique for determining the extent of digital privacy, while rejecting older conceptions based on previous precedents. Constitutional law expert Orin S. Kerr called the Chatrie ruling a "blockbuster" that adopts a new course for Fourth Amendment disputes on both precise types of network information and on the larger issue of personal privacy rights for corporate-held information.
