= Third-party doctrine =

Limit to right to privacy in U.S.

The third-party doctrine is a United States legal doctrine that holds that people who voluntarily give information to third parties, such as banks and phone companies, generally have "no reasonable expectation of privacy" in that information. This precedent, established in Supreme Court cases in the 1970s, allows the U.S. government to obtain information from third parties without a legal warrant and without otherwise complying with the Fourth Amendment prohibition against search and seizure without probable cause and a judicial search warrant. However, there are several subsequent court cases and laws that limit application of the third-party doctrine, including to electronic communications and location data.

== Chronology ==
Followed by the states in 1791, the Fourth Amendment to the United States Constitution was enacted in 1792, holding:

The right of the people to be secure in their persons, houses, papers, and effects, against unreasonable searches and seizures, shall not be violated, and no Warrants shall issue, but upon probable cause, supported by Oath or affirmation, and particularly describing the place to be searched, and the persons or things to be seized.

In Katz v. United States (1967), the United States Supreme Court established its reasonable expectation of privacy test, which drastically expanded the scope of what was protected by the Fourth Amendment to include "what [a person] seeks to preserve as private, even in an area accessible to the public."

In response to Katz v. United States (1967) and Berger v. New York (1967), the United States Congress enacted the Omnibus Crime Control and Safe Streets Act of 1968, of which Title III is known as the "Wiretap Act." Title III was Congress' attempt to extend Fourth Amendment-like protections to telephonic and other wired forms of communication.

In 1976 (United States v. Miller) and 1979 (Smith v. Maryland), the Court affirmed that "a person has no legitimate expectation of privacy in information he voluntarily turns over to third parties."

In 1986, the United States Congress updated the Omnibus Crime Control and Safe Streets Act of 1968 by enacting the Electronic Communications Privacy Act which included an updated "Wiretap Act" and also extended Fourth Amendment-like protections to electronic communications in Title II of the Electronic Communications Privacy Act, known as the Stored Communications Act.

A 2012 Maryland District Court court case (United States v. Graham) held that historical cell site location data is not protected by the Fourth Amendment.

In the same year, Associate Justice Sonia Sotomayor, writing a concurrence in a case (United States v. Jones) involving the police placing a GPS tracker on a suspect without a warrant, noted that

More fundamentally, it may be necessary to reconsider the premise that an individual has no reasonable expectation of privacy in information voluntarily disclosed to third parties. This approach is ill suited to the digital age, in which people reveal a great deal of information about themselves to third parties in the course of carrying out mundane tasks.

In Carpenter v. United States (2018), the Supreme Court ruled warrants are needed for gathering cell phone tracking information, remarking that cell phones are almost a “feature of human anatomy”, “when the Government tracks the location of a cell phone it achieves near perfect surveillance, as if it had attached an ankle monitor to the phone's user”. and that

[cell-site location information] provides officers with “an all-encompassing record of the holder's whereabouts” and “provides an intimate window into a person's life, revealing not only [an individual's] particular movements, but through them [their] familial, political, professional, religious, and sexual associations.”

In 2019, Utah passed the Electronic Information or Data Privacy Act which requires a warrant for accessing Utah residents' private information stored with third parties.

In June 2020, the Fifth Circuit found in United States v. Gratkowski that transaction data with exchanges of virtual currency such as Bitcoin, are akin to bank records and not subject to Fourth Amendment protections.

In August 2024, the Fifth Circuit found in United States v. Smith that location history shared with Google was akin to cell-site location information at issue in Carpenter v. United States, and so a warrant based on probable cause and particularized suspicion is required for law enforcement to obtain location history from Google. The geofence warrant used by law enforcement in that case was, the Fifth Circuit held, inadequate. The court went on, however, to apply the good faith exception to the exclusionary rule, upholding the trial court's use of the evidence obtained in the convictions of the defendants.

In 2026, the Supreme Court limited the application of the doctrine to digital location data as well. Chatrie v. United States held that law enforcement conducts a Fourth Amendment search when it compels Google to provide a user's historical location information, even though the data is held by a third-party techonology company. In the majority opinion, Justice Elena Kagan reasoned that Google Location History reveals sensitive details about a person and is not "voluntarily" shared in the sense contemplated by the traditional third-party doctrine.

== See also ==
- Financial privacy laws in the United States
- Privacy and the US government
- Privacy laws of the United States
- Secrecy of correspondence
