= United States v. Councilman =

Criminal case

- Court: United States Court of Appeals for the First Circuit
- Full case name: United States of America v. Bradford C. Councilman
- Argued: December 3, 2003
- Decided: June 29, 2004
- Citations: Panel opinion: 373 F.3d 197; En banc opinion: 418 F.3d 67

Case history
- Prior history: 245 F. Supp. 2d 319 (D. Mass. 2003)

Court membership
- Judges sitting: Panel: Juan R. Torruella, Conrad K. Cyr, Kermit Lipez; En banc: Michael Boudin, Torruella, Bruce M. Selya, Cyr, Sandra Lynch, Lipez, Jeffrey R. Howard

Case opinions
- Majority: Panel: Torruella, joined by Cyr
- Majority: En banc: Lipez, joined by Boudin, Selya, Lynch, Howard
- Dissent: Panel: Lipez
- Dissent: En banc: Torruella, joined by Cyr

Laws applied
- Electronic Communications Privacy Act

United States v. Councilman, 373 F.3d 197 (1st Cir. 2004), reversed en banc, 418 F.3d 67 (1st Cir. 2005), was a criminal case involving interception of e-mail while in temporary storage en route to its final destination. Earlier rulings in the case had raised concerns about the privacy of e-mail and the effectiveness of the Electronic Communications Privacy Act of 1986 (ECPA).

== Indictment ==
Defendant Bradford C. Councilman was Vice President of Interloc, Inc., which ran an online rare and out-of-print book listing service. As part of its service, Interloc gave book dealer customers an e-mail address at the domain "interloc.com" and acted as the e-mail provider. Councilman managed the e-mail service and the dealer subscription list.

On July 11, 2001, a grand jury returned a two-count indictment against Councilman. Count One charged him under 18 U.S.C. § 371, the general federal criminal conspiracy statute, and for conspiracy to violate the Wiretap Act, 18 U.S.C. § 2511. According to the indictment, in January 1998, Councilman directed Interloc employees to intercept and copy all incoming communications to subscriber dealers from Amazon.com, an Internet retailer that sells books and other products. The alleged object of the conspiracy was to exploit the content of e-mail from Amazon.com to dealers in order to develop a list of books, learn about competitors, and attain a commercial advantage for Interloc and its parent company.

== Dismissal and reinstatement ==
Councilman moved to dismiss the indictment for failure to state an offense under the Wiretap Act, arguing that the intercepted e-mail messages were in "electronic storage," as defined in 18 U.S.C. § 2510(17), and therefore were not, as a matter of law, subject to the prohibition on "intercept[ing] . . . electronic communication[s]," 18 U.S.C. § 2511(1)(a). The district court granted Councilman's motion, and a divided three-judge panel of the First Circuit Court of Appeals affirmed. However, the First Circuit then reviewed the decision en banc and reversed.

The court held: "Although the text of the statute does not specify whether the term "electronic communication" includes communications in electronic storage, the legislative history of the ECPA indicates that Congress intended the term to be defined broadly. Furthermore, that history confirms that Congress did not intend, by including electronic storage within the definition of wire communications, to thereby exclude electronic storage from the definition of electronic communications."

== Final Disposition ==
In February 2007, Councilman was acquitted of all charges, the Associated Press reported. The case against him was based on claims by two Interloc employees that he had instructed them to keep copies of the mail. Councilman denied those claims, a detail not previously noted in press reports. In 2007 a Massachusetts jury agreed that the employees' claims were not credible, that Councilman had not instructed them, and dismissed the case.

== See also ==
- Stengart v. Loving Care Agency
