= Omnibus Crime Control and Safe Streets Act of 1968 =

US federal legislation

- Long title: An Act to assist State and local governments in reducing the incidence of crime, to increase the effectiveness, fairness, and coordination of law enforcement and criminal justice systems at all levels of government, and for other purposes.
- Nicknames: Law Enforcement and Criminal Justice Assistance Act of 1967
- Enacted by: the 90th United States Congress
- Effective: June 19, 1968

Citations
- Public law: 90-351
- Statutes at Large: 82 Stat. 197

Codification
- Titles amended: 34 U.S.C.: Crime Control and Law Enforcement
- U.S.C. sections created: 34 U.S.C. § 10101 et seq.

Legislative history
- Introduced in the House as H.R. 5037 by Emanuel Celler (D–NY) on July 17, 1967; Committee consideration by House Judiciary, Senate Judiciary; Passed the House on August 8, 1967 (378–23); Passed the Senate on May 23, 1968 (72–4, in lieu of S. 917) with amendment; House agreed to Senate amendment on June 6, 1968 (369–17); Signed into law by President Lyndon B. Johnson on June 19, 1968

United States Supreme Court cases
- Scarborough v. United States, 431 U.S. 563 (1977)

The Omnibus Crime Control and Safe Streets Act of 1968 (Pub. L. 90–351, 82 Stat. 197, enacted June 19, 1968, codified at 34 U.S.C. § 10101 et seq.) was legislation passed by the Congress of the United States and signed into law by President Lyndon B. Johnson that established the Law Enforcement Assistance Administration (LEAA). Title III of the Act set rules for obtaining wiretap orders in the United States. The act was a major accomplishment of Johnson's war on crime.

== Grants ==
The LEAA, which was superseded by the Office of Justice Programs, provided federal grant funding for criminology and criminal justice research, much of which focused on social aspects of crime. Research grants were also provided to develop alternative sanctions for punishment of young offenders. Block grants were provided to the states, with $100 million in funding. Within that amount, $50 million was earmarked for assistance to local law enforcement agencies, which included funds to deal with riot control and organized crime.

== Handguns ==
The Omnibus Crime Bill also prohibited interstate trade in handguns and increased the minimum age to 21 for buying handguns. This legislation was soon followed by the Gun Control Act of 1968, which set forth additional gun control restrictions.

On May 10, 2023, Senior District Judge Robert E. Payne of the Eastern District of Virginia declared the minimum age for handgun purchases to be unconstitutional.

On December 1, 2023, District Judge Thomas Kleeh of the Northern District of West Virginia also declared the minimum age requirement unconstitutional.

== Wiretaps ==
The wiretapping section of the bill was passed in part as a response to the U.S. Supreme Court decisions Berger v. New York, 388 U.S. 41 (1967) and Katz v. United States, 389 U.S. 347 (1967), which both limited the power of the government to obtain information from citizens without their consent, based on the protections under the Fourth Amendment to the U.S. Constitution. In the Katz decision, the Court "extended the Fourth Amendment protection from unreasonable search and seizure to protect individuals with a 'reasonable expectation of privacy.'"

Section 2511(3) of the Crime Control Bill specifies that nothing in the act or the Federal Communications Act of 1934 shall limit the constitutional power of the President "to take such measures as he deems necessary":

- "to protect the nation against actual or potential attack or other hostile acts of a foreign power, to obtain foreign intelligence information deemed essential to the security of the United States or to protect national security information against foreign intelligence activities"
- "to protect the United States against the overthrow of the Government by force or other unlawful means, or against any other clear and present danger to the structure or existence of the Government"

The section also limits use in evidence only where the interception was reasonable and prohibits disclosure except for purpose.

In 1975, the United States Senate Select Committee to Study Governmental Operations with Respect to Intelligence Activities, (known as the "Church Committee") was established to investigate abuses by the Central Intelligence Agency (CIA), National Security Agency (NSA), Federal Bureau of Investigation (FBI), and the Internal Revenue Service (IRS). In 1975 and 1976, the Church Committee published 14 reports on various U.S. intelligence agencies' operations, and a report on the FBI's COINTELPRO program stated that "the Fourth Amendment did apply to searches and seizures of conversations and protected all conversations of an individual as to which he had a reasonable expectation of privacy...At no time, however, were the Justice Department's standards and procedures ever applied to NSA's electronic monitoring system and its 'watch listing' of American citizens. From the early 1960s until 1973, NSA compiled a list of individuals and organizations, including 1200 American citizens and domestic groups, whose communications were segregated from the mass of communications intercepted by the Agency, transcribed, and frequently disseminated to other agencies for intelligence purposes".

Academic Colin Agur argues that the act "disappoints" from the perspective of Brandeisian legal philosophy, in regards to individual privacy, because it assumes that law enforcement agencies have a right to electronic surveillance, instead of "giving unambiguous priority to individual privacy."

=== Employee privacy ===
The Act prohibits "employers from listening to the private telephone conversations of employees or disclosing the contents of these conversations." Employers can ban personal phone calls and can monitor calls for compliance provided they stop listening as soon as a personal conversation begins. Violations carry fines up to $10,000. The Electronic Communications Privacy Act of 1986 expanded these protections to electronic and cell phone communication. See also Employee monitoring and Workplace privacy.

== FBI expansion ==
The bill increased the FBI budget by 10% to fund police training at the FBI National Academy. Much of this training was for riot control, a popular political issue at the time.

== Miranda warning ==
In 1966, the U.S. Supreme Court decision in Miranda v. Arizona (384 U.S. 436) created the requirement that a citizen must be informed of their legal rights upon their arrest and before they are interrogated, which came to be known as Miranda warnings. Responding to various complaints that such warnings allowed too many criminals go free, Congress, in provisions codified under 18 U.S.C. § 3501 with a clear intent to reverse the effect of the court ruling, included a provision in the Crime Control Act directing federal trial judges to admit statements of criminal defendants if they were made voluntarily, without regard to whether he had received the Miranda warnings.

The stated criteria for voluntary statements depended on such things as:

(1) the time between arrest and arraignment;
(2) whether the defendant knew the crime for which he had been arrested;
(3) whether he had been told that he did not have to talk to the police and that any statement could be used against him;
(4) whether the defendant knew prior to questioning that he had the right to the assistance of counsel; and,
(5) whether he actually had the assistance of counsel during questioning.

It also provided that the "presence or absence of any of" the factors "need not be conclusive on the issue of voluntariness of the confession." (As a federal statute, it applied only to criminal proceedings either under federal laws, or in the District of Columbia.)

That provision was disallowed in 1968 by a federal appeals court decision that was not appealed, and it escaped Supreme Court review until 32 years after passage, in Dickerson v. United States (2000). A lower court of the Fourth Circuit had reasoned that Miranda was not a constitutional requirement, that Congress could therefore overrule it by legislation, and that the provision in the Omnibus Crime Control Act had supplanted the requirement that police give Miranda warnings. The Supreme Court overturned the Fourth Circuit decision, reaffirming the ruling of Miranda v. Arizona as the primary guideline for the admissibility of statements made during custodial interrogation, and stating that Congress does not have the legislative power to supersede Miranda v. Arizona.

== See also ==
- Gun law in the United States
- Warrantless wiretaps
