= Carpenter v. United States =

- Supreme Court of the United States

Argued November 29, 2017 Decided June 22, 2018
- Full case name: Timothy Ivory Carpenter v. United States of America
- Docket no.: 16-402
- Citations: 585 U.S. 296 (more) 138 S. Ct. 2206; 201 L. Ed. 2d 507
- Argument: Oral argument
- Opinion announcement: Opinion announcement
- Decision: Opinion

Case history
- Prior: United States v. Carpenter, No. 2:12-cr-20218 (E.D. Mich. 2013). Affirmed, United States v. Carpenter, 819 F.3d 880 (6th Cir. 2016). Cert. granted, 581 U.S. 1017 (2017).
- Subsequent: Affirmed, 926 F.3d 313 (6th Cir. 2019). Remanded for resentencing, 788 Fed. Appx. 364 (6th Cir. 2019). Affirmed, No. 22-1198 (6th Cir. 2023). Rehearing en banc denied (6th Cir. 2023). Cert. denied (2024).

Questions presented
- Whether the warrantless seizure and search of historical cell phone records revealing the location and movements of a cell phone user over the course of 127 days is permitted by the Fourth Amendment.

Holding
- Government acquisition of cell-site records is a search under the Fourth Amendment, and, thus requires a warrant.

Court membership
- Chief Justice John Roberts Associate Justices Anthony Kennedy · Clarence Thomas; Ruth Bader Ginsburg · Stephen Breyer; Samuel Alito · Sonia Sotomayor; Elena Kagan · Neil Gorsuch

Case opinions
- Majority: Roberts, joined by Ginsburg, Breyer, Sotomayor, Kagan
- Dissent: Kennedy, joined by Thomas, Alito
- Dissent: Thomas
- Dissent: Alito, joined by Thomas
- Dissent: Gorsuch

Laws applied
- U.S. Const. amend. IV

Carpenter v. United States, 585 U.S. 296 (2018), is a landmark United States Supreme Court case concerning the privacy of historical cell site location information (CSLI). The Court held that government entities violate the Fourth Amendment to the United States Constitution when accessing historical CSLI records containing the physical locations of cellphones without a search warrant.

Prior to Carpenter, government entities could obtain cellphone location records from service providers by claiming the information was required as part of an investigation, without a warrant, but the ruling changed this procedure. Recognizing the influence of new consumer communications devices in the 2010s, the Court expanded its conceptions of constitutional rights toward the privacy of this type of data. However, the Court emphasized that the Carpenter ruling was narrowly restricted to the precise types of information and search procedures that were relevant to this case.

== Background ==
=== Cell site location information (CSLI) ===
Cellular telephone service providers are able to find the location of cell phones through either Global Positioning System (GPS) data or cell site location information (CSLI), in the process of connecting calls and data transmissions. CSLI is captured by nearby cell towers, and this information is used to triangulate the location of phones. Service providers capture and store this data for business purposes, such as troubleshooting, maximizing network efficiencies, and determining whether to charge customers roaming fees for particular calls.

The data can also illustrate the historical movements of a cellphone. Thus, anyone with access to this data has the ability to know where the phone has been and what other cell phones were in the same area at a given time. When users travel with their cellphones, this data can theoretically illustrate every place a person has traveled, and possibly the locations of other people encountered via their corresponding data.

=== Third-party doctrine ===
Prior to Carpenter, the Supreme Court consistently held that a person had no reasonable expectation of privacy in regard to information voluntarily turned over to third-parties such as telephone companies, and therefore a search warrant is not required when government officials seek this information. This legal theory is known as the third-party doctrine, established by the Supreme Court in Smith v. Maryland (1979), in which the Court determined that government officials can obtain a list of phone numbers dialed from a suspect's phone.

By the 2010s, cellphones and particularly smartphones had become important tools for nearly every person in the United States. Many applications, such as GPS navigation and location tools, require a phone to send and receive information constantly, including the exact location of the phone, often without intent on the part of its owner. As technology advanced in the 2010s, the Supreme Court began to modify its precedents on government searches of personal communications devices, given new consumer behaviors that may transcend the third-party doctrine.

== Case history ==
Between December 2010 and March 2011, several individuals in the Detroit, Michigan area conspired and participated in armed robberies at RadioShack and T-Mobile stores across the region. In April 2011, four of the robbers were captured and arrested. The petitioner, Timothy Carpenter, was not among the initial group of arrestees. One of those arrested confessed and turned over his phone so that FBI agents could review the calls made from his phone around the time of the robberies. The agents obtained a search warrant to inspect the information in that arrestee's phone, in order to find additional contacts of the arrestee and compile more evidence about the crime ring.

From the historical cell site records on the arrestee's phone, the agents confirmed that Timothy Carpenter was also part of the crime ring, and proceeded to compile information about the location of his phone over 127 days. In turn, this information revealed that Carpenter had been within a two-mile radius of four robberies at the times they were perpetrated. This evidence was used to support Carpenter's arrest. At criminal court, Carpenter was found guilty of several counts of aiding and abetting robberies that affected interstate commerce, and another count of using a firearm during a violent crime. He was sentenced to 116 years in prison.

=== Circuit court ruling ===
Carpenter appealed his conviction and sentencing to the United States Court of Appeals for the Sixth Circuit, arguing that the CSLI evidence used against him should be suppressed because the police had not obtained a warrant pertaining to his CSLI records before searching through them. In 2015, the Circuit Court upheld Carpenter's conviction. This ruling was largely based on the Smith v. Maryland precedent, stating that Carpenter used cellular telephone networks voluntarily, and per the third-party doctrine he had no reasonable expectation that the data should be private. Thus, review of that information by the police did not constitute a "search" and did not require a warrant under the Fourth Amendment.

Carpenter appealed this ruling to the U.S. Supreme Court, which granted certiorari in 2016.

== Supreme Court ruling ==
Oral arguments
Recording of oral arguments before the Supreme Court.

Twenty amicus curiae briefs were filed by interested organizations, scholars, and corporations for Carpenter's case. Some considered the case to be the most important Fourth Amendment dispute to come before the Supreme Court in a generation. The Court issued its decision on June 22, 2018, with the majority opinion written by Chief Justice John Roberts.

The Court's ruling recognized that the Carpenter case revealed a contradiction between two lines of Supreme Court rulings on the matter of police searches of personal communications information. In United States v. Jones (2012) the Court had ruled that GPS tracking could constitute a search under the Fourth Amendment as a violation of a person's reasonable expectation of privacy. Meanwhile, the Court had held in Smith v. Maryland (1979) that the third-party doctrine absolved the government from warrant requirements when searching through telephone records.

Ultimately, in Carpenter the court determined that the third-party doctrine could not be extended to historical cell site location information (CSLI). Instead, the Court compared "detailed, encyclopedic, and effortlessly compiled" CSLI records to the GPS information at issue in United States v. Jones, recognizing that both forms of data accord the government the ability to track individuals' past movements. Furthermore, the Court noted that CSLI could pose even greater privacy risks than GPS data, as the prevalence of cellphones could accord the government "near perfect surveillance" of an individual's movements. Accordingly, the Court ruled that, under the Fourth Amendment, the government must obtain a search warrant in order to access historical CSLI records.

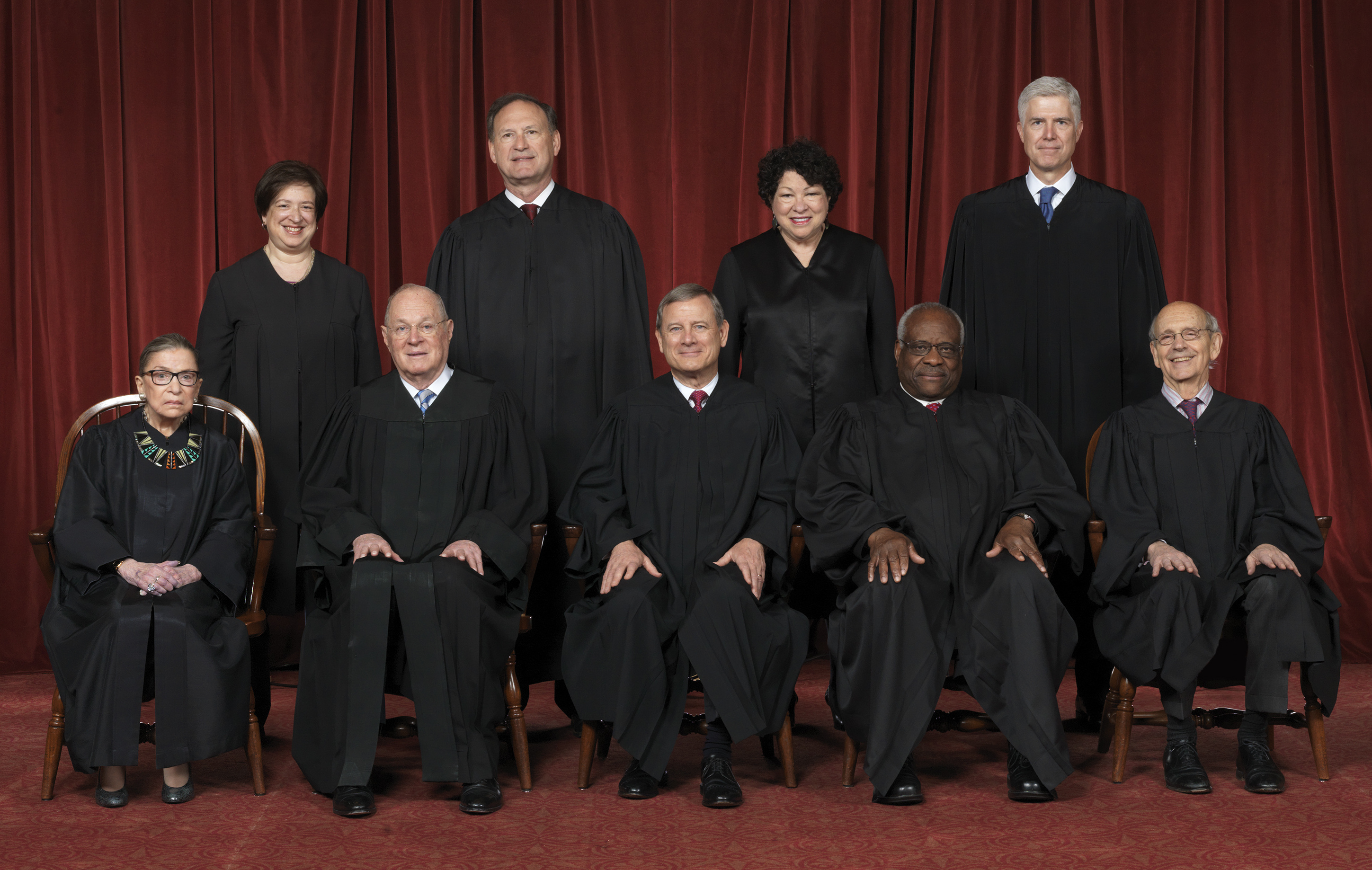
The Supreme Court Justices presiding over the Carpenter case. Front row (left to right): Ruth Bader Ginsburg, Anthony Kennedy, John Roberts (Chief Justice), Clarence Thomas, and Stephen Breyer. Back row (left to right): Elena Kagan, Samuel Alito, Sonia Sotomayor, and Neil Gorsuch.

Roberts argued that technology "has afforded law enforcement a powerful new tool to carry out its important responsibilities. At the same time, this tool risks Government encroachment of the sort the Framers [of the U.S. Constitution], after consulting the lessons of history, drafted the Fourth Amendment to prevent." As stated in the opinion, "Unlike the nosy neighbor who keeps an eye on comings and goings, they [new technologies] are ever alert, and their memory is nearly infallible. There is a world of difference between the limited types of personal information addressed in Smith [...] and the exhaustive chronicle of location information casually collected by wireless carriers today."

However, Roberts stressed that the Carpenter decision was a very narrow one and did not affect other uses of the third-party doctrine, such as searches of banking records. Similarly, he noted that the decision did not prevent the collection of CSLI without a warrant in cases of emergency or for issues of national security.

=== Dissenting opinions ===
Justice Anthony Kennedy, in a dissenting opinion joined by Justices Clarence Thomas and Samuel Alito, cautioned against the limitations on law enforcement inherent in the majority opinion. According to Kennedy, the ruling "places undue restrictions on the lawful and necessary enforcement powers exercised not only by the Federal Government, but also by law enforcement in every State and locality throughout the Nation. Adherence to this Court's longstanding precedents and analytic framework would have been the proper and prudent way to resolve this case."

In another dissent, Alito wrote: "I fear that today's decision will do far more harm than good. The Court's reasoning fractures two fundamental pillars of Fourth Amendment law, and in doing so, it guarantees a blizzard of litigation while threatening many legitimate and valuable investigative practices upon which law enforcement has rightfully come to rely."

In his own dissenting opinion, Justice Neil Gorsuch argued that the Fourth Amendment had lost its original meaning based on property rights, stating that it "grants you the right to invoke its guarantees whenever one of your protected things (your person, your house, your papers, or your effects) is unreasonably searched or seized. Period." Gorsuch further recommended that the third-party doctrine, as well as Katz v. United States, be overturned as inconsistent with the original meaning and application of the Fourth Amendment. On the facts of the case, Gorsuch stressed that CSLI data is personal property, and its storage by telephone companies should be immaterial as the company is serving, in effect, as a bailee.

In yet another dissenting opinion, Thomas argued that what mattered was not if there was a search, but rather whose property was searched. Thomas argued that the Fourth Amendment guarantees each person to be secure from unreasonable searches of their own property. He argued that the cell phone records are the property of the phone service provider, as Carpenter did not keep or maintain the records, nor could he destroy them. Therefore, Carpenter could not bring suit under a Fourth Amendment violation, since it was not his property that was searched. Additionally, Thomas criticized the Katz framework that was used in the majority decision as well as many other surveillance-related cases before the Supreme Court. Thomas said that the Katz test had "no basis in the text or history of the Fourth Amendment. And, it invites courts to make judgements about policy, not law." Thomas also opined that "The Fourth Amendment, as relevant here, protects '[t]he right of people to be secure in their persons, houses, papers, and effects, against unreasonable searches.' By defining 'search' to mean 'any violation of reasonable expectations of privacy,' the Katz test misconstrues virtually every one of those words." Thomas concluded by saying the Katz test is a failed experiment, and that the court should reconsider it.

== Impact and subsequent developments ==
After the Supreme Court ruling, Carpenter's criminal conviction was remanded to the Sixth Circuit to determine if it could stand without the CSLI data that required a warrant per the Supreme Court. Carpenter's lawyers argued that the data should have been subject to the exclusionary rule and thrown out as material collected without a proper warrant under the Supreme Court's ruling. However, the Circuit Court judges concluded that the FBI was acting in good faith with respect to collecting the data based on the law at the time the crimes were committed. This type of good faith exemption is permitted per another Supreme Court precedent, Davis v. United States (2011). The evidence was allowed to stand, and the Sixth Circuit again upheld Carpenter's criminal conviction and prison sentence. His arguments concerning sentencing procedures under the recently enacted First Step Act were rejected.

The Supreme Court's ruling in Carpenter was narrow and did not otherwise change the third-party doctrine related to other business records that might incidentally reveal location information, nor did it overrule prior decisions concerning conventional surveillance techniques and tools such as security cameras. The Court did not extend its ruling to other matters related to cellphones not presented in Carpenter, including real-time CSLI or "tower dumps" (the downloading of information about all the devices that were connected to a particular cell site during a particular interval). The opinion also did not consider other data collection goals involving foreign affairs or national security.

== See also ==
- Chatrie v. United States (2026)
- Geofence
