= United States v. Miller (1976) =

- Supreme Court of the United States

Argued January 12, 1976 Decided April 21, 1976
- Full case name: United States v. Miller
- Citations: 425 U.S. 435 (more) 96 S. Ct. 1619; 48 L. Ed. 2d 71

Case history
- Prior: 500 F.2d 751 (5th Cir. 1974); rehearing en banc denied, 508 F.2d 588 (5th Cir. 1975); cert. denied, 421 U.S. 1010 (1975).

Holding
- Bank records are not subject to protection under the Fourth Amendment to the United States Constitution.

Court membership
- Chief Justice Warren E. Burger Associate Justices William J. Brennan Jr. · Potter Stewart; Byron White · Thurgood Marshall; Harry Blackmun · Lewis F. Powell Jr. William Rehnquist · John P. Stevens

Case opinions
- Majority: Powell, joined by Burger, Stewart, White, Blackmun, Rehnquist, Stevens
- Dissent: Brennan
- Dissent: Marshall

United States v. Miller, 425 U.S. 435 (1976), was a United States Supreme Court case that held that bank records are not subject to protection under the Fourth Amendment to the United States Constitution. The case, along with Smith v. Maryland, established the principle of the third-party doctrine in relation to privacy rights.

== Background ==
In 1973, sheriffs for Houston County, Georgia discovered an undocumented whiskey distillery, first by seizing a truck with distillery equipment and arresting its drivers, and later investigating a warehouse fire in the town of Kathleen and discovering distillery equipment there. They identified the warehouse property leaser as Mitch Miller of Georgia. The Alcohol, Tobacco and Firearms Bureau (ATF) of the United States Treasury Department, investigating the case, requested that local banks, holding Miller's accounts, provide all paperwork of his bank transactions to date via a grand jury subpoena duces tecum, rather than a warrant; the banks complied without notifying Miller. The financial records supported evidence that Miller had rented the truck, radio equipment, and sheet metal to support the distillery, and he and four others were charged with conspiracy (by selling tax-free whiskey), possession of distilled spirits, and possession of an unregistered still.

The trial was held at the United States District Court for the Middle District of Georgia. During the defense, Miller attempted to prevent the bank records from being submitted as evidence, claiming these were illegally obtained, as such records should be protected from illegal search and seizure under the Fourth Amendment. The District Court rejected Miller's arguments, and resulted in a conviction with a sentence of three years in prison for Miller. Miller argued on the use of bank records as evidence to the Fifth Circuit Court of Appeals, which reversed the District Court's findings. Miller had attempted to argue that the Bank Secrecy Act, which required banks to make microfilm copies of all checks they processed, was unconstitutional, the Fifth Circuit recognized that the Supreme Court had validated the Act's constitutionality through California Bankers Ass'n v. Shultz, but this did not allow for the types of actions that the ATF used. The Fifth Circuit cited Boyd v. United States for the proposition that "a compulsory production of a man's private papers to establish a criminal charge against him...is within the scope of the Fourth Amendment". The court ruled that the Bank Secrecy Act did not overrule Fourth Amendment protections, and overturned the District Court's ruling.

== Supreme Court ==
The government petitioned the Supreme Court to hear their appeal, asking whether the privacy rights of the Fourth Amendment covered the method that the ATF had acquired the bank records. Oral arguments were presented on January 12, 1976, with a decision issued on April 21, 1976.

The majority decision was given by Justice Lewis Powell, with all but Justices Brennan and Marshall joining, reversing the Fifth Circuit's decision. Powell determined that the bank records were not the private papers of Miller, but instead owned by the banks as part of its necessary business operations. Reiterating points made in California Bankers Ass'n v. Shultz, Powell stated that there is no expectation of privacy that a customer of a bank has when they do business through the bank, as checks, deposit slips and other paperwork are elements of commercial transactions. The Supreme Court remanded Miller's case back to the Fifth Circuit.

Justice William J. Brennan Jr. dissented, identifying that a similar case, Burrows v. Superior Court, had been decided in the California Supreme Court that ruled that bank records were protected under the Fourth Amendment, in a manner consistent with California Bankers Ass'n v. Shultz, which the Court could have used for this case. Justice Thurgood Marshall also dissented, reiterating his dissent from California Bankers Ass'n that he believed the Bank Secrecy Act was unconstitutional and would lead to violation of Fourth Amendment rights.

== Impact ==
United States v. Miller, along with Smith v. Maryland, which dealt with the privacy of telephone records, established the concept of a third-party doctrine that has been used by the courts to determine to what extent Fourth Amendment protection expectation of privacy covers. This doctrine generally finds that information that a person provides voluntarily to a third-party no longer is covered by expectation of privacy, and the government can obtain such information without a warrant.

== See also ==
- Right to Financial Privacy Act of 1978
