= Smith v. Maryland =

- Supreme Court of the United States

Argued March 28, 1979 Decided June 20, 1979
- Full case name: Michael Lee Smith v. Maryland
- Citations: 442 U.S. 735 (more) 99 S. Ct. 2577; 61 L. Ed. 2d 220; 1979 U.S. LEXIS 134

Case history
- Prior: Smith v. State, 283 Md. 156, 389 A.2d 858 (1978); cert. granted, 439 U.S. 1001 (1978).

Holding
- The installation and use of a pen register is not a "search" within the meaning of the Fourth Amendment, and hence no warrant is required.

Court membership
- Chief Justice Warren E. Burger Associate Justices William J. Brennan Jr. · Potter Stewart; Byron White · Thurgood Marshall; Harry Blackmun · Lewis F. Powell Jr. William Rehnquist · John P. Stevens

Case opinions
- Majority: Blackmun, joined by Burger, White, Rehnquist, Stevens
- Dissent: Stewart, joined by Brennan
- Dissent: Marshall, joined by Brennan
- Powell took no part in the consideration or decision of the case.

Smith v. Maryland, 442 U.S. 735 (1979), is a Supreme Court case holding that the installation and use of a pen register by the police to obtain information on a suspect's telephone calls was not a "search" within the meaning of the Fourth Amendment to the United States Constitution, and hence no search warrant was required. In the majority opinion, Justice Harry Blackmun rejected the idea that the installation and use of a pen register constitutes a violation of the suspect's reasonable expectation of privacy since the telephone numbers would be available to and recorded by the phone company anyway.

The Smith ruling was the Supreme Court's first significant articulation of the third-party doctrine in which government investigators may be permitted to search a person's private information by obtaining it not from the person directly, but from a business or other party with which the person has traded such information voluntarily.

== Background ==
The law surrounding police searches of a suspect's telephone information dates back to 1928. That year, the Supreme Court ruled in Olmstead v. United States that wiretapping of private phone calls does not require a warrant under the Fourth Amendment because the intrusion does not take place within a private home. That ruling was overturned in 1967 in Katz v. United States, in which the Supreme Court held that the Fourth Amendment applied not just to places but to a person's private life, thus making a warrant required for many more types of police searches.

Smith v. Maryland originated in 1976, when police in Baltimore, Maryland suspected Michael Lee Smith of robbing a woman and then continuing to harass her via telephone. Police sought evidence that Smith had called the victim's phone number, and approached the local telephone company about installing a pen register at the company's central office to record the numbers that Smith had called from his home phone. The pen register data revealed that Smith had indeed called the victim, and this data was used to support his arrest and conviction.

Smith appealed his conviction in Maryland court, arguing that police collection of information about his telephone calls was a search that required a warrant under the Fourth Amendment. His constitutional argument was rejected and his criminal conviction stood. Smith appealed to the U.S. Supreme Court, which granted certiorari.

== Opinion of the court ==
The Supreme Court, in a majority opinion written by Justice Harry Blackmun, held that police use of a pen register to collect information on telephone usage is not a search because the "petitioner voluntarily conveyed numerical information to the telephone company." Since Smith "disclosed" the dialed numbers to the telephone company so that they could connect his calls, he could not reasonably expect that the numbers he dialed were private.

Per the third-party doctrine, the court determined that a customer on a public telephone network uses the service voluntarily and must accept that the network provider knows and records the numbers called in order to connect calls and charge accordingly. Thus, the voluntary network customer must also accept that other parties, including the police, can review that usage information and there is no realistic expectation of privacy for that data. Therefore, the police are not required to obtain a warrant to collect that information.

=== Dissenting opinions ===
In a dissenting opinion, Justice Potter Stewart argued that, like the contents of a conversation, the record of numbers dialed from a private telephone should be constitutionally protected because the phone numbers that someone calls can provide a portrait of their personal life and therefore should be subjected to constitutional protections. According to Stewart, even though a pen register does not record the content of a phone call, "The numbers dialed from a private telephone—although certainly more prosaic than the conversation itself—are not without 'content'."

In another dissenting opinion, Justice Thurgood Marshall expressed his disagreement with the majority's interpretation of the third-party doctrine, stating: "The use of pen registers, I believe, constitutes such an extensive intrusion. [...] The prospect of unregulated governmental monitoring will undoubtedly prove disturbing even to those with nothing illicit to hide. Many individuals, including members of unpopular political organizations or journalists with confidential sources, may legitimately wish to avoid disclosure of their personal contacts."

== Impact and legacy ==
The Smith decision solidified the third-party doctrine, making it easier for government investigators to surveil information that the users of telecommunications networks voluntarily share with network providers. The Smith decision also added to the definition of types of communication that may or may not fall within the reasonable expectation of privacy in light of new developments in telecommunications service.

However, the ruling concerned landline telephone technologies that were prevalent in 1979. Regardless, the precedent is still being used decades later to justify government surveillance of more advanced Internet communications platforms that collect much more personal information, including the content of messages, and are not necessarily used "voluntarily". This has led to some criticism of the use of the Smith precedent by the National Security Agency (NSA) and law enforcement entities to justify modern electronic surveillance. This conundrum has led one federal judge to call for the Smith precedent to be reevaluated or eliminated in light of more recent technological developments, though other judges have accepted its use in court disputes surrounding surveillance by the NSA. This has resulted in some calls to reassess both the third-party doctrine and the continued efficacy of the Smith precedent in light of modern telecommunications technologies and the personal information they collect.

== See also ==
- List of United States Supreme Court cases, volume 442
