= Reasonable expectation of privacy =

U.S. legal test regarding privacy

In United States constitutional law, reasonable expectation of privacy is a legal test which is crucial in defining the scope of the applicability of the privacy protections of the Fourth Amendment to the U.S. Constitution. It is related to, but is not the same as, a right to privacy, a much broader concept which is found in many legal systems (see privacy law). Overall, reasonable expectations of privacy can be subjective or objective.

== Overview ==
There are two types of reasonable expectations of privacy:

- Subjective expectation of privacy: a certain individual's opinion that a certain location or situation is private which varies greatly from person to person
- Objective expectation of privacy: legitimate and generally recognized by society and perhaps protected by law.

Places where individuals expect privacy include residences, hotel rooms, or public places that have been provided by businesses or the public sector to ensure privacy, including public restrooms, private portions of jailhouses, or phone booths. This expectation extends against both physical and digital intrusions, and even cell tower geolocation data is protected.

In general, one cannot have a reasonable expectation of privacy for things put into a public space. There are no privacy rights in garbage left for collection in a public place. Other examples include: pen registers that record the numbers dialed from particular telephones; conversations with others, though there could be a Sixth Amendment violation if the police send an individual to question a defendant who has already been formally charged; a person's physical characteristics, such as voice or handwriting; what is observed pursuant to aerial surveillance that is conducted in public navigable airspace not using equipment that unreasonably enhances the surveying government official's vision; anything in open fields (e.g., a barn); smells that can be detected by the use of a drug-sniffing dog during a routine traffic stop, even if the government official did not have probable cause or reasonable suspicion to suspect that drugs were present in the defendant's vehicle; and paint scrapings on the outside of a vehicle.

While a person may have a subjective expectation of privacy in their car, it is not always an objective one, unlike a person's home. Reasonable expectations of home privacy extend to thermal imaging.

The reasonable expectation of privacy concept also applies civilly whereas the unreasonable violation of which may result in mental distress rather than incarceration. Civil privacy expects against: (1) intrusion upon seclusion or solitude, or into private affairs; (2) public disclosure of embarrassing private facts; (3) publicity which places a person in a false light in the public eye; and (4) appropriation of name or likeness.

== Privacy and search ==
The reasonable expectation of privacy is crucial in distinguishing a legitimate, reasonable police search and seizure from an unreasonable one.

A "search" occurs for purposes of the Fourth Amendment when the Government violates a person's "reasonable expectation of privacy". In Katz v. United States, 389 U.S. 347 (1967) Justice Harlan issued a concurring opinion articulating the two-prong test later adopted by the U.S. Supreme Court as the test for determining whether a police or government search is subject to the limitations of the Fourth Amendment:

- Governmental action must contravene an individual's actual, subjective expectation of privacy
- Expectation of privacy must be reasonable, in the sense that society in general would recognize it as such

To meet the first part of the test, the person from whom the information was obtained must demonstrate that they, in fact, had an actual, subjective expectation that the evidence obtained would not be available to the public. In other words, the person asserting that a search was conducted must show that they kept the evidence in a manner designed to ensure its privacy.

The first part of the test is related to the notion "in plain view". If a person did not undertake reasonable efforts to conceal something from a casual observer (as opposed to a snoop), then no subjective expectation of privacy is assumed.

The second part of the test is analyzed objectively: would society at large deem a person's expectation of privacy to be reasonable? If it is plain that a person did not keep the evidence at issue in a private place, then no search is required to uncover the evidence. For example, there is generally no search when police officers look through garbage because a reasonable person would not expect that items placed in the garbage would necessarily remain private. An individual has no legitimate expectation of privacy in information provided to third parties (third-party doctrine). In Smith v. Maryland, 442 U.S. 735 (1979), the Supreme Court held individuals have no "legitimate expectation of privacy" regarding the telephone numbers they dial because they knowingly give that information to telephone companies when they dial a number. Therefore, there is no search where officers monitor what phone numbers an individual dials, although the Congress has enacted laws that restrict such monitoring. The Supreme Court has also ruled that there is no objectively reasonable expectation of privacy (and thus no search) when officers hovering in a helicopter 400 feet above a suspect's house conduct surveillance. The U.S. Court of Appeals for the Sixth Circuit held in 2010 that users did have a reasonable expectation of privacy in the contents of their e-mail in United States v. Warshak, although no other court of appeals has followed suit.

== In cyberspace ==
Most Internet users expect some extent of privacy protection from the law while they are online. However, scholars argue that lack of understanding of the Internet as either a public or private space leads to issues in defining expectations of the law. The Fourth Amendment may not protect informational privacy. Relevant exceptions to the Fourth Amendment's warrant requirement include "1) when consent to search has been given (Schneckloth v. Bustamonte, 1973), (2) when the information has been disclosed to a third party (United States v. Miller, 1976), and (3) when the information is in plain view of an officer (Horton v. California, 1990)".

There is a reasonable expectation of privacy for the contents of a cellphone. Cellphones receive Fourth Amendment protection because they no longer contain just phone logs and address books; they contain a person's most sensitive information that they believe will be kept private. The reasonable expectation of privacy has been extended to include the totality of a person's movements captured by tracking their cellphone. Generally, a person loses the expectation of privacy when they disclose information to a third party, including circumstances involving telecommunications. However, the Supreme Court has extended Fourth Amendment protections to the CSLI data generated by a cellphone tracking a user's movements because the disclosure is not voluntary, phone companies keep the records for years, and the invasive nature of the scope of information that can be gathered by tracking a person's movement for extended periods of time.

== Court cases ==
In Florida v. Jardines on March 26, 2013, the U.S. Supreme Court ruled that police violated the Fourth Amendment rights of a homeowner when they led a drug-sniffing dog to the front door of a house suspected of being used to grow marijuana.

In a 5-to-4 decision, the court said that police conducted a "search" when they entered the property and took the dog to the house's front porch. Since the officers had not first obtained a warrant beforehand, their search was unconstitutional, the court said. The court said the police officers violated a basic rule of the Fourth Amendment by physically intruding into the area surrounding a private home for investigative purposes without securing a warrant.

"When it comes to the Fourth Amendment, the home is first among equals," Justice Scalia wrote. "At the amendment's very core stands the right of a man to retreat into his own home and there be free from unreasonable government intrusion." Scalia added: "This right would be of little practical value if the state's agents could stand in a home's porch or side garden and trawl for evidence with impunity."

This case may provide some argument or protection in the area of reasonable expectation of privacy in one's home and curtilage given the rapid advancement of drone technology, particularly given law enforcements' stated intent to deploy these technologies. This question may well turn on the court's interpretation of the "naked eye" test (described in the earlier Ciraolo case) in relation to the "enhanced view" test. It would seem enhanced view(s) are achievable through the use of drone technology. See also: Kyllo v. United States, 533 U.S. 27 (2001) (precludes enhanced views from outside a home without a warrant, using thermal imaging).

In Missouri v. McNeely on April 17, 2013, the U.S. Supreme Court ruled that police must generally obtain a warrant before subjecting a drunken-driving suspect to a blood test. The vote was 8-to-1, with Justice Clarence Thomas the lone dissenter.

In Katz v. United States on October 17, 1967, Justice Harlan created the Reasonable Expectation of Privacy Test in his concurring opinion. The two-part test consists of:

1. The individual has exhibited an actual (subjective) expectation of privacy
2. The expectation is one that society is prepared to recognize as reasonable

== In marketing ==
Privacy has also been talked about in the context of business actions, consumer reaction, and regulatory efforts from both consumers and marketers' interaction. Milne and Shalini (2010) presented the question of how both of these groups start and upkeep privacy boundaries. Information about the relationship between consumers and marketers has been defined by this fine line of what is the privacy a customer is willing to provide to the marketer. Milne and Shalini (2010) used information gathered in a national online survey to compare three different groups of customers. They asked these groups questions around the limits of using information technology such as the use of cookies, biometrics, loyalty cards, radio frequency identification, text messaging, pop-up advertisements, telemarketing, and spam. The authors use these same surveys with groups of marketing managers and database vendors. This survey study presented results that provided discussion as there was a discrepancy in the answers from the customers and the marketers/vendors. The customers' expectations around privacy were different from those of a marketer/vendor. The difference in their answers prompted the Milne and Shalini (2010) to advise for attention to this issue and asked for public policy to take notice of these findings.
