= Katz v. United States =

- Supreme Court of the United States

Argued October 17, 1967 Decided December 18, 1967
- Full case name: Charles Katz v. United States
- Citations: 389 U.S. 347 (more) 88 S. Ct. 507; 19 L. Ed. 2d 576; 1967 U.S. LEXIS 2

Case history
- Prior: 369 F.2d 130 (9th Cir. 1966); cert. granted, 386 U.S. 954 (1967).

Holding
- The Fourth Amendment's protection from unreasonable search and seizure extends to any area where a person has a "reasonable expectation of privacy."

Court membership
- Chief Justice Earl Warren Associate Justices Hugo Black · William O. Douglas; John M. Harlan II · William J. Brennan Jr. Potter Stewart · Byron White; Abe Fortas · Thurgood Marshall

Case opinions
- Majority: Stewart, joined by Warren, Douglas, Harlan, Brennan, White, Fortas
- Concurrence: Douglas, joined by Brennan
- Concurrence: Harlan
- Concurrence: White
- Dissent: Black
- Marshall took no part in the consideration or decision of the case.

Laws applied
- U.S. Const. amend. IV
- This case overturned a previous ruling or rulings
- Olmstead v. United States (1928)

Katz v. United States, 389 U.S. 347 (1967), is a landmark decision of the U.S. Supreme Court in which the Court redefined what constitutes a "search" or "seizure" with regard to the Fourth Amendment to the U.S. Constitution. The ruling expanded the Fourth Amendment's protections from an individual's "persons, houses, papers, and effects," as specified in the Constitution's text, to include any areas where a person has a "reasonable expectation of privacy." The reasonable expectation of privacy standard, now known as the Katz test, was formulated in a concurring opinion by Justice John Marshall Harlan II.

The Katz test has since been used in numerous cases, particularly because of technological advances that create new questions about privacy norms and government surveillance of personal data.

== Background ==
Charles Katz was a sports bettor who by the mid-1960s had become "probably the preeminent college basketball handicapper in America". In 1965, Katz regularly used a public telephone booth near his apartment on Sunset Boulevard in Los Angeles to communicate his gambling handicaps to bookmakers in Boston and Miami. Unbeknownst to him, the FBI had begun investigating his gambling activities and was recording his conversations via a covert listening device attached to the outside of the phone booth. After recording many of his phone calls, FBI agents arrested Katz and charged him with eight counts of knowingly transmitting wagering information by telephone between U.S. states, which is a federal crime under Section 18 of the United States Code, particularly a law on the transmission of wagering information.

Katz was tried in the U.S. District Court for the Southern District of California. (Note: The Southern District was split in 1966, and today the case would fall under the United States District Court for the Central District of California.) Katz moved to suppress the FBI's recordings, arguing that because the agents did not have a search warrant allowing them to place their listening device, the recordings had been made in violation of the Fourth Amendment and should be inadmissible in court per the exclusionary rule. The judge denied Katz's motion and held that the recordings were admissible as evidence, and Katz was convicted based on them.

Katz appealed his conviction to the U.S. Court of Appeals for the Ninth Circuit. In 1966, the Ninth Circuit affirmed Katz's conviction, ruling that because the FBI's eavesdropping device did not physically penetrate the telephone booth's wall, no Fourth Amendment search occurred, and so the FBI did not need a warrant to place the device. Katz then appealed to the Supreme Court, which granted certiorari.

== Opinion of the court ==
On December 18, 1967, the Supreme Court issued a 7–1 (Note: Newly appointed justice Thurgood Marshall recused himself from the case to avoid a conflict of interest. Marshall had been the U.S. Solicitor General up until two weeks before oral arguments, and he had helped write the U.S. government's brief in the case.) decision in favor of Katz that invalidated the FBI's wiretap evidence and overturned Katz's criminal conviction.

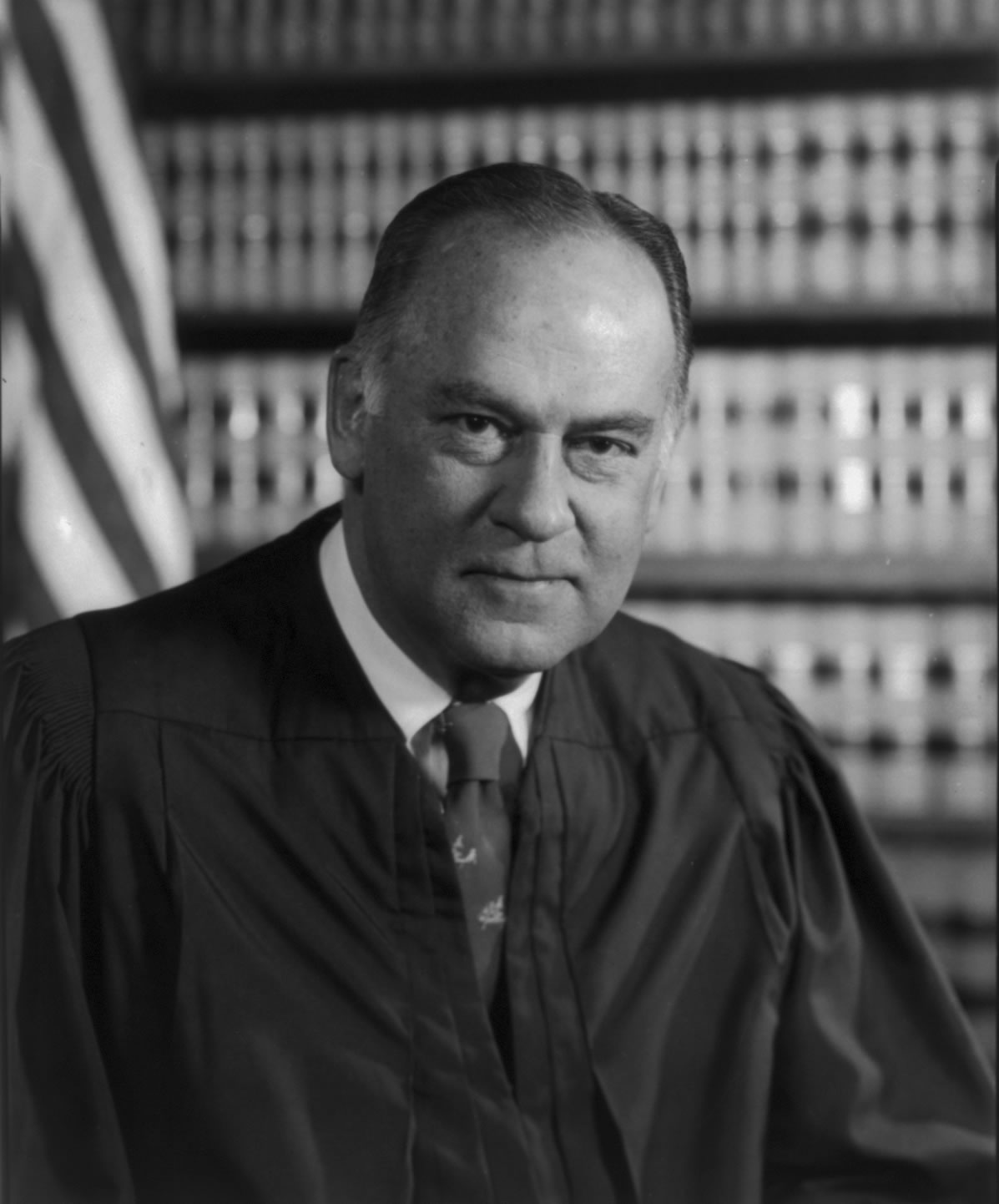
Justice Potter Stewart, who authored the Court's opinion in Katz

The majority opinion was written by Justice Potter Stewart. The Court began by dismissing the parties' characterization of the case in terms of a traditional trespass-based analysis that hinged on, first, whether the public telephone booth Katz had used was a "constitutionally protected area" where he had a "right of privacy"; and second, on whether the FBI had "physically penetrated" the protected area and thus violated the Fourth Amendment. Instead, the Court viewed the situation through the lens of how Katz's use of the phone booth would be perceived by himself and then objectively by others. In an oft-cited passage, Stewart wrote:

The petitioner [Katz] has strenuously argued that the booth was a "constitutionally protected area." The Government has maintained with equal vigor that it was not. But this effort to decide whether or not a given "area," viewed in the abstract, is "constitutionally protected" deflects attention from the problem presented by this case. For the Fourth Amendment protects people, not places. What a person knowingly exposes to the public, even in his own home or office, is not a subject of Fourth Amendment protection. But what he seeks to preserve as private, even in an area accessible to the public, may be constitutionally protected.

— Katz, 389 U.S. at 352 (footnotes and citations omitted).

The Supreme Court then surveyed the history of American jurisprudence on governmental searches and seizures. It described how American courts had traditionally analyzed Fourth Amendment searches by comparing them to the long-established doctrine of trespass. In their legal briefs, the parties had focused on the 1928 precedent Olmstead v. United States, in which the Court ruled that surveillance by wiretap without any trespass did not constitute a "search" for Fourth Amendment purposes. However, the Court stated that in later cases it had begun recognizing that the Fourth Amendment applied to recorded speech obtained without any physical trespassing, and that the law had evolved. Stewart wrote:

We conclude that the underpinnings of Olmstead [and similar cases] have been so eroded by our subsequent decisions that the "trespass" doctrine there enunciated can no longer be regarded as controlling. The Government's activities in electronically listening to and recording the petitioner's words violated the privacy on which he justifiably relied while using the telephone booth and thus constituted a "search and seizure" within the meaning of the Fourth Amendment.

— Katz, 389 U.S. at 353.

Stewart then concluded the Court's opinion by ruling that even though the FBI knew there was a "strong probability" that Katz was breaking the law when using the phone booth, their use of the wiretap was an unconstitutional search because they did not obtain a warrant before placing the listening device. This overturned Katz's criminal conviction as a constitutional violation.

=== Harlan's concurrence ===
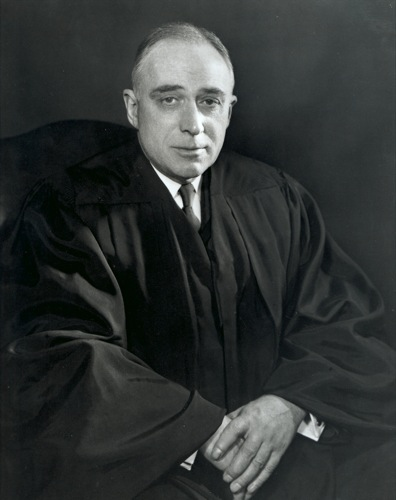
Justice John Marshall Harlan II, whose concurring opinion created the two-part "Katz test" that is regularly applied in Fourth Amendment cases

Justice John Marshall Harlan II's concurring opinion in Katz has become more influential than the majority opinion. The concurrence introduced a two-part test that has come to be known as the Katz test.

Harlan began his opinion by noting that he was writing separately to elaborate on the meaning of Stewart's majority opinion. Harlan explained that he interpreted Stewart's statements that "the Fourth Amendment protects people, not places" and "what a person knowingly exposes to the public [...] is not a subject of Fourth Amendment protection" to mean that the Fourth Amendment is activated any time a person has a reasonable expectation of privacy in the eyes of society at large. He summarized his view of the law as comprising a two-part test:

My understanding of the rule that has emerged from prior decisions is that there is a twofold requirement, first that a person have exhibited an actual (subjective) expectation of privacy and, second, that the expectation be one that society is prepared to recognize as "reasonable." Thus a man's home is, for most purposes, a place where he expects privacy, but objects, activities, or statements that he exposes to the "plain view" of outsiders are not "protected" because no intention to keep them to himself has been exhibited. On the other hand, conversations in the open would not be protected against being overheard, for the expectation of privacy under the circumstances would be unreasonable.

— Katz, 389 U.S. at 361 (Harlan, J., concurring).

The Supreme Court adopted Harlan's two-part test as a formulation of the Fourth Amendment search analysis for most subsequent cases involving governmental searches that generated constitutional challenges.

=== Black's dissent ===
Justice Hugo Black was the only dissenter in the decision. He argued that the Fourth Amendment was only meant to protect "things" from physical search and seizure, and was not meant to protect personal privacy. Additionally, Black argued that the modern act of wiretapping was analogous to the act of eavesdropping, which was common even when the Bill of Rights was drafted. Black concluded that if the drafters of the Fourth Amendment had meant for it to protect against eavesdropping they would have included the proper language.

== Impact and legacy ==
The Supreme Court's decision in Katz significantly expanded the scope of the Fourth Amendment's protections, and represented an unprecedented shift in American search and seizure jurisprudence. Many law enforcement practices that previously were not "within the view" of the Fourth Amendment—such as wiretaps on public phone wires—were now covered by the Fourth Amendment and cannot be conducted without first obtaining a search warrant. The Katz precedent continues to be consulted regularly to interpret disputes over modern electronic surveillance by the National Security Agency and law enforcement entities, though with some concerns that the Katz test is becoming outdated due to modern surveillance technologies.

However, Katz also created significantly more uncertainty surrounding the application of the Fourth Amendment. The Katz test of an objective "reasonable expectation of privacy," which has been widely adopted by U.S. courts, has proven much more difficult to apply than the traditional analysis of whether a physical intrusion into "persons, houses, papers, and effects" occurred. In a 2007 Stanford Law Review article, legal scholar Orin Kerr described the scholarly consensus that the Katz test has been a failure:

According to the Supreme Court, the Fourth Amendment regulates government conduct that violates an individual's reasonable expectation of privacy. But no one seems to know what makes an expectation of privacy constitutionally "reasonable."... Although four decades have passed since Justice Harlan introduced the test in his concurrence in Katz v. United States, the meaning of the phrase "reasonable expectation of privacy" remains remarkably opaque.... The consensus among scholars is that the Supreme Court's "reasonable expectation of privacy" cases are a failure.

Other legal scholars have praised Katz as "the king of surveillance cases" due to Stewart's holding that "the Fourth Amendment protects people, not places." They also state that this case stood as a "bulwark against wiretaps and other emerging forms of surveillance."

== See also ==
- List of United States Supreme Court cases, volume 389
