= Title II of the Patriot Act =

Title of the USA PATRIOT Act

The USA PATRIOT Act was passed by the United States Congress in 2001 as a response to the September 11, 2001 attacks. It has ten titles, each containing numerous sections. Title II: Enhanced Surveillance Procedures granted increased powers of surveillance to various government agencies and bodies. This title has 25 sections, with one of the sections (section 224) containing a sunset clause which sets an expiration date, December 31, 2005, for most of the title's provisions. This was extended twice: on December 22, 2005 the sunset clause expiration date was extended to February 3, 2006 and on February 2 of the same year it was again extended, this time to March 10.

Title II contains many of the most contentious provisions of the act. Supporters of the Patriot Act claim that these provisions are necessary in fighting the war on terrorism, while its detractors argue that many of the sections of Title II infringe upon Constitutionally protected individual and civil rights.

The sections of Title II amend the Foreign Intelligence Surveillance Act of 1978 and its provisions in 18 U.S.C., dealing with "Crimes and Criminal Procedure". It also amends the Electronic Communications Privacy Act of 1986. In general, the Title expands federal agencies' powers in intercepting, sharing, and using private telecommunications, especially electronic communications, along with a focus on criminal investigations by updating the rules that govern computer crime investigations. It also sets out procedures and limitations for individuals who feel their rights have been violated to seek redress, including against the United States government. However, it also includes a section that deals with trade sanctions against countries whose government supports terrorism, which is not directly related to surveillance issues.

== Overview ==
Title II covers all aspects of the surveillance of suspected terrorists, those suspected of engaging in computer fraud or abuse, and agents of a foreign power who are engaged in clandestine activities (in other words, spying). In particular, the title allows government agencies to gather "foreign intelligence information" from both US and non-US citizens, which is defined in section 203 of the title. Section 218 changed the requirements to obtain a FISA surveillance to include that a "significant purpose'' of the surveillance is to "obtain foreign intelligence information" where formerly it was required to be "the primary purpose." The change in definition was meant to remove a legal "wall" between criminal investigations and surveillance for the purposes of gathering foreign intelligence, which hampered investigations when criminal and foreign surveillance overlapped. However, that this wall even existed was found by the Foreign Intelligence Surveillance Court of Review to have actually been a long-held misinterpretation by government agencies. Section 203 also gave authorities the ability to share information gathered before a federal grand jury with other agencies.

Though not related to surveillance, the title also covers trade sanctions against the Taliban — a group which was determined by the Secretary of State to have repeatedly provided support for acts of international terrorism – and the export of agricultural commodities, medicine, or medical devices is now pursuant to one-year licenses issued and reviewed by the United States Government. It also excluded export of agricultural commodities, medicine, or medical devices to the Government of Syria and to the Government of North Korea.

=== Scope of allowed surveillance ===
The title allows surveillance to intercept communications via pen register or trap and trace devices. It does not allow these surveillance measures to be used in violation of the First Amendment rights of U.S. citizens. To assist in an investigation undertaken to protect against international terrorism or clandestine intelligence activities, the title allows for the seizure of communications records (section 215) and any records of session times, durations of electronic communication as well as any identifying numbers or addresses of the equipment that was being used (section 210). Such orders may be granted ex parte, and once they are granted – in order to not jeopardize the investigation – the order may not disclose the reasons behind why the order was granted. Section 209 made it easier for authorities to gain access to voicemail as they no longer must apply for a wiretap order, and instead just apply for a normal search warrant.

All orders granted under section 215 must be disclosed to the Permanent Select Committee on Intelligence of the House of Representatives and the Select Committee on Intelligence of the Senate. Every six months, the Attorney General must also provide a report to the Committees on the Judiciary of the House of Representatives and the Senate which details the total number of applications made for orders approving requests for the production of tangible things and the total number of such orders either granted, modified, or denied.

Under section 211, the United States Code was amended to allow the government to have access to the records of cable customers, with the notable exclusion of access to records revealing cable subscriber selection of video programming from a cable operator.

=== Disclosure ===
Section 212 stopped a communications provider from disclosing the contents of communications with another party. However, if the provider "reasonably" (not defined) believes that an emergency involving immediate danger of death or serious physical injury to any person is imminent, then the communications provider can now disclose this information without fear of liability. The provider may also disclose communications at the request of a government agency, if the customer allows it to be disclosed, or in cases where they must do so to protect their rights or property. Section 212 was later repealed by the Homeland Security Act of 2002 and was replaced with a new and permanent emergency disclosure provision.

=== Surveillance orders ===
In order for surveillance to be carried out, the United States Attorney General or his subordinates (so designated under section 201) may authorize a federal judge to grant a surveillance order to the FBI or other Federal agency. Each of the orders granted must be reviewed by one of 11 district court judges, of which at any one time three must live within 20 miles of the District of Columbia (see section 208).

Title II amended the U.S. Code to allow a magistrate judge to issue a warrant outside of their district for any orders that relate to terrorism (section 219). Section 220 of the title also gave a Federal court judge the power to issue nationwide service of search warrants for electronic surveillance.

Under FISA, any agency may require a common carrier, landlord, custodian, or other person provide them with all information, facilities, or technical assistance necessary to accomplish ongoing electronic surveillance. They must also protect the secrecy of and cause as little disruption to the ongoing surveillance effort as possible. This was further tightened in section 206. Section 222 further limited the sort of assistance an agency may require, and provided for compensation of any person who rendered surveillance assistance to the government agency. Section 225 allows for legal immunity to any provider of a wire or electronic communication service, landlord, custodian, or other person that provides any information, facilities, or technical assistance in accordance with a court order or request for emergency assistance.

=== Liability due to unauthorized surveillance ===
Section 223 allows any party who has had their rights violated due to the illegal interception of communications to take civil action against any party who undertook the illegal surveillance.

=== Sunset ===
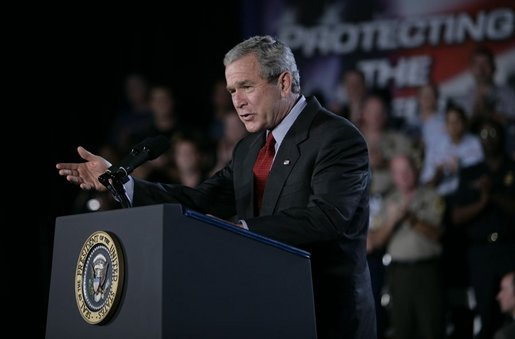
President George W. Bush addresses an audience Wednesday, July 20, 2005 at the Port of Baltimore in Baltimore, Md., encouraging the renewal of provisions of the Patriot Act.

Section 224 (Sunset) is a sunset clause. Title II and the amendments made by the title originally would have ceased to have effect on December 31, 2005, with the exception of the below sections. However, on December 22, 2005, the sunset clause expiration date was extended to February 3, 2006, and then on February 2, 2006 it was further extended to March 2010. Of the fourteen permanent sections, eleven belong to Title II.

Permanent Title II Sections
Section	Section title
203(a)	Authority to share criminal investigation information: Authority to share Grand Jury information
203(c)	Authority to share criminal investigation information: Procedures
205	Employment of translators by the Federal Bureau of Investigation
208	Designation of judges
210	Scope of subpoenas for records of electronic communications
211	Clarification of scope
213	Authority for delaying notice of the execution of a warrant
216	Modification of authorities relating to use of pen registers and trap and trace devices
219	Single-jurisdiction search warrants for terrorism
221	Trade sanctions
222	Assistance to law enforcement agencies

Further, any particular foreign intelligence investigations that are ongoing will continue to be run under the expired sections. Sections 215–unrestricted seizures allowed, including that of medical records, for example–and 206 ("roving wiretaps") have sunsets on different dates, as does Section 702. The time when one will next be reviewed is due to happen in December, 2023.

== Commentary ==
Various organizations have commented on Title II. Some of the most significant commentary has come from the Electronic Privacy Information Center (EPIC), the Electronic Frontier Foundation (EFF), the American Bar Association (ABA), the American Civil Liberties Union (ACLU) and from the United States government.

=== American Bar Association ===
The ABA passed resolutions that asked the U.S. government "to conduct a thorough review of the implementation of the powers granted to the Executive Branch under the [USA PATRIOT] Act before considering legislation that would extend or further expand such powers ...." and "to conduct regular and timely oversight including public hearings ... to ensure that government investigations undertaken pursuant to the Foreign Intelligence Surveillance Act ... do not violate the First, Fourth, and Fifth Amendments of the Constitution ...." They also set up a website, Patriot Debates to discuss issues in relation to the USA PATRIOT Act. Various people debated specific sections of Title II in great depth on the site.

==== Section 203 ====
Kate Martin, the director of the Center for National Security Studies, argued that section 203 and 905 should be modified as she maintains the Act fails to discriminate between information gathered between terrorist and non-terrorist investigations. She believes that the Act should be modified to include some privacy safeguards: before information is gathered she believes that the court should approve the information transfer to make sure that it is necessary for ongoing activities by the agencies involved; that information shared should be limited to information relevant to investigations into terrorism; that only those people who have access to such information should actually need it to do their jobs (currently those who are not directly related to the investigation can gain access to the information); and information gathered should be marked as confidential and measures put into place to stop the inappropriate dissemination of such information. Her views were opposed by Viet Dinh, who believed that such alterations would hinder terrorism investigations.

==== Section 206 ====
James X. Dempsey argued that Section 206, which allows for roving surveillance under FISA, was reasonable considering that investigators already had the ability to perform roving surveillance in criminal cases. However, he says that "as with so many provisions of the PATRIOT Act, the concern with Section 206 is not with the authority itself [but] rather, the issue is the lack of adequate checks and balances". Dempsey believes that the section lacks two important safeguards that are present in the corresponding legislation for criminal investigations: 1) that agents actually ascertain the location of the suspect before turning on their recording devices, and 2) that "some additional changes to FISA adopted outside of the normal process in the Intelligence Authorization Act a few months after the PATRIOT Act had the probably unintended effect of seeming to authorize "John Doe" roving taps – that is, FISA orders that identify neither the target nor the location of the interception.". Dempsey also believes that the law should be changed so that those under surveillance via FISA should also be notified after surveillance has ceased, so that those wrongly targeted and placed under surveillance can challenge the government's actions. However, Paul Rosenzweig disagreed with Dempsey's premise that "relaxation of the particularity requirement is constitutionally suspect" and believed that it colored his argument that section 206 should be modified. Rosenzweig believes that the addition of an ascertainment requirement and the requirement that the identification of individuals should be more specific "seem unnecessary and unwise" — in Rosenzweig's view it would unnecessarily burden the ability of law enforcement and intelligence agents to perform surveillance on terrorist suspects.

==== Section 209, 212 and 220 ====
Dempsey also argued that section 209, which deals with the seizure of voicemails through the use of a normal search warrant, unnecessarily overlooked the importance of notice under the Fourth Amendment and under a Title III wiretap. He believes that there is no way to seek redress under the new provisions, as those who have an ordinary search warrant against them may never find out that their voicemail has been seized. On the now repealed section 212 and the similar current provision in the Homeland Security Act, which allows for the emergency disclosure of electronic communications under certain circumstances, he believes it leaves the law open for abuse as an agency may "cut corners" by informing an ISP about a potential emergency, leading to the ISP then making emergency disclosures based on this information. Dempsey suggests several modifications to implement checks and balances into the section: make after-the-act judicial review mandatory, with the suppression of evidence which is not deemed to be properly justified; the mandatory disclosure to the person whose privacy has been invaded that their information has been provided to the government; and to "make it illegal for a government official to intentionally or recklessly mislead a service provider as to the existence of an emergency". Dempsey also believes that section 220, which allows for the nationwide service of search warrants for electronic evidence, made it "more difficult for a distant service provider to appear before the issuing court and object to legal or procedural defects". A solution suggested by Dempsey to this problem would be to allow a warrant to be challenged in the district it was served as well as in the district it was issued.

Orin S. Kerr also agreed with James Dempsey that the sections were uncontroversial, but argued they should be kept. Kerr believes that "for the most part, Jim Dempsey's proposals for reform would impose greater privacy restrictions for online investigations than equivalent offline investigations". He believes that Dempsey's proposal to require after-the-act judicial review for exigent circumstances has no parallel in the Fourth Amendment; that allowing recipients of orders to challenge orders within the recipients own district would not follow "the traditional rule that any challenge (itself an extremely rare event) must be filed in the issuing district"; and that disclosure to the person whose electronic voicemail has been seized also has no such parallel in the Fourth Amendment, as while notice must be given to a home owner whose house is being searched this is not done to allow a challenge to the order but rather shows them that due legal process is being followed and that the search is not being conducted by a rogue agent – Kerr believes that "current law appears to satisfy this policy concern by providing notice to the ISP".

==== Section 213 ====
Heather Mac Donald argued that section 213, which provides for the so-called "sneak and peek" provisions of the Patriot Act, is necessary because the temporary delay in notification of a search order stops terrorists from tipping off their counterparts that they are being investigated. She claims that the section allows the government to conduct secret searches without notification from such organizations as the ACLU and the Century Foundation are wrong, and listed several arguments that she believed are easily discredited. She called them: "Conceal Legal Precedent", "Hide the Judge", "Amend the Statute", and "Reject Secrecy". James X. Dempsey countered that section 213 was a "perfect example of a good idea gone too far" and argued that secrecy was already dealt when FISA was amended in 1994 to allow the government to carry out secret searches. Dempsey objects to the fact that section 213 as enacted is not limited to terrorism cases. Dempsey believes that the section confuses the law and was hastily cobbled together – his primary example is the reference to the definition of "adverse result", which he argues was unrelated with regards to the Patriot Act's purposes. He believes the definition is too broad and "offer little guidance to judges and will bring about no national uniformity in sneak and peek cases." He also believes that "reasonable period" is too vague and that it leaves judges with no uniform standard, and may leave courts outside the Ninth and Second Circuit the ability to make up their own rules. He also wonders why if sneak and peak orders are a "time-honored tool" used by courts for decades, then why it was necessary for the Justice Department to push to make section 213 applicable in all cases that such a measure is used. The answer Dempsey posits is that they were on shaky constitutional ground and that they were "trying to bolster it with Congressional action – even action by a Congress that thought it was voting on an anti-terrorism bill, not a general crimes bill." Dempsey's reasons for believing that they were on shaky ground was because although the 1986 United States v. Freitas, 800 F.2d 1451 (9th Cir.), and 1990, United States v. Villegas, 899 F.2d 1324 (2d Cir.) circuit opinions were premised on the assumption that notice was not an element of the Fourth Amendment, Wilson v. Arkansas, 514 U.S. 927 (1995) Justice Thomas of the Supreme Court found that notice is part of the Fourth Amendment. In order to fix what he believes to be serious flaws in section 213, Dempsey proposes several changes be made to the section: the requirement for reasonable cause to be found by a judge be changed to be probable cause; that the section should not apply to every case of delayed notification and that Congress should require that any delay in notification not extend for more than seven days without additional judicial authorization.

==== Section 214 and 215 ====
Andrew C. McCarthy believed that sections 214 (deals with Pen Register and Trap and Trace Authority under FISA) and 215 (expanded what records could be accessed under FISA) should be retained. He argues that the Federal Rules of Criminal Procedure, Rule 17(c), authorizes the compulsory production of "any books, papers, documents, data, or other objects" to criminal investigators by mere subpoena, and so section 215 merely brought FISA into line with current criminal law. He also states that the records included in section 215 are records held by third parties, and therefore are exempt from a citizen's reasonable expectations of privacy. In light of this, McCarthy believes that there are three main reasons why the access to library records is not a problem: firstly he believes that the government has always had the authority to compel the reading of records by subpoena and there has been "no empirical indication of systematic prying into private choices – else we'd surely have heard from the robustly organized librarians"; secondly he believes that in the current information age that there is just too much information for inappropriate access to such records; and thirdly he believes that an a priori ban on the investigative access to the reading of records would be both unprecedented and wrong. He points out that "literature evidence was a staple of terrorism prosecutions throughout the 1990s" and that the reading of records has already led to convictions of terrorists.

Though the government must only specify that the records concerned are sought for an authorized investigation instead of providing "specific and articulable facts" to perform surveillance on an agent of a foreign power, he points out that it prohibits investigations that violate first amendment rights of citizens, which he says is not specified in the corresponding criminal procedures. He says that the FISC is not meant to apply searching judicial review of surveillance orders as the role of the judiciary is to make sure the executive branch is not abusing its powers and "by requiring the FBI to make solemn representations to the court, and mandating that the Attorney General report semi-annually on this provision's implementation, Section 215 provides suitable metrics for oversight and, if necessary, reform". However, McCarthy does believe that section 215 "should be amended to clarify that order recipients may move the FISA court to quash or narrow production", however he says that the US DOJ has already decided that this is implicit in the section so it is probably unnecessary. He believes that further amendment is unnecessary and unwise.

On section 214, McCarthy believes that the pre-Patriot Act version of FISA, which required government agencies to "certify that the monitored communications would likely be those either of an international terrorist or spy involved in a violation of U.S. criminal law, or of an agent of a foreign power involved in terrorism or espionage" was "an unnecessary and imprudently high hurdle" as pen registers and wiretaps do not violate the Fourth Amendment. Therefore, he argues, "there is no constitutional reason to require investigators to seek court authorization for them at all". Thus McCarthy says, the amendments to FISA made by section 214 are "both modest and eminently reasonable".

Peter P. Swire was much more skeptical about section 214 and 215 than McCarthy. He explains that FISA originally did not apply to business records and was only designed for surveillance, and after the Oklahoma and World Trade Center bombing it was amended to apply to travel documents only. It was section 215 that made broad changes to allow access to business records. He also explains that the legal standing changed in such a way that a FISA order to access business records to could apply to anyone, and if necessary the government could ask for access to whole databases. He argues that "FISA orders can now apply to anyone, not only the target of the investigation" and that it is no longer necessary for FISA orders to be targeted against a foreign power or agents of a foreign power, but can now be used to gain records of those who have nothing to do with a foreign power. He says that there are only weak constraints to base the order on an authorized investigation and that surveillance must not be based entirely on First Amendment activities.

Swire pointed out that business records obtained under FISA are different from those obtained under similar criminal legislation, in that gag orders may not be applied to criminal investigations. He also argues that the US DOJ's assertion that they can gain access to documents held by a third party because these documents are not protected by the Fourth Amendment is flawed because "it mistakenly asserts that something that is constitutional is also desirable policy". He points out that "to see this mistake, consider that a 90 percent income tax is almost certainly constitutional, but few people think it therefore would be a wise policy" . In this light he argues that a better policy for sensitive library documents is to have significant oversight from the courts.

==== Section 218 ====
Andrew C. McCarthy argued that section 218, which changed FISA from stating that the purpose of foreign surveillance was to gather intelligence information to be the significant purpose of intelligence information gathering, should be kept even though it is already clear that this is what is meant under FISA in any case. He explains that FISA was misinterpreted to have "primary purpose" tests for surveillance for nearly a quarter-century, and that in April 2002 the Foreign Intelligence Surveillance Court of Review found that,

it is quite puzzling that the Justice Department, at some point during the 1980s, began to read the statute as limiting the Department's ability to obtain FISA orders if it intended to prosecute the targeted agents–even for foreign intelligence crimes... the definition of foreign intelligence information includes evidence of crimes such as espionage, sabotage or terrorism. Indeed, it is virtually impossible to read the 1978 FISA to exclude from its purpose the prosecution of foreign intelligence crimes, most importantly because, as we have noted, the definition of an agent of a foreign power–if he or she is a U.S. person–is grounded on criminal conduct.

Similarly, McCarthy argues that the separation of foreign intelligence and criminal investigation is a false dichotomy, in that "the existence of a crime or national security threat is an objective reality, entirely independent of the investigators' subjective mindsets about why they are investigating". He believes that it is wrong "to suspect systematically dishonest resort to FISA [, as] FISA applications require a specialized and rigorous internal approval process before presentation to the court. Assuming arguendo an agent willing to act corruptly, it would be far easier and less detectable to fabricate the evidence necessary to get an ordinary criminal wiretap than to fabricate a national security reason to use FISA". McCarthy believes that over time, the U.S. Justice Department misinterpreted FISA to believe that criminal investigations could not be undertaken under FISA, but "began construing the certification not as a mere announcement of purpose but as something more restrictive: a substantive limitation on the use of FISA evidence in criminal cases". McCarthy then explains that the Foreign Intelligence Surveillance Court of Review found that ""clearly did not preclude or limit the government's use ... of foreign intelligence information, which included evidence of certain kinds of criminal activity, in a criminal prosecution." McCarthy then notes the practical consequences of the U.S. DoJ's misinterpretation of FISA:

The best known pernicious consequence of all this occurred in August 2001. Relying on the wall, FBI headquarters declined to allow criminal investigators to assist an intelligence investigation seeking to locate probable terrorists Khalid al-Midhar and Nawaf al-Hazmi. A few weeks later, on 9/11, the pair helped hijack Flight 77 and pilot it into the Pentagon.

In light of these matters, McCarthy believes that although section 218 is not legally necessary it should remain anyway, to clarify clearly what the Act says and remove any misunderstanding as to what is meant in FISA, and he believes that the section should not sunset.

David D. Cole argued that the changes to the law were unnecessary, and accused the proponents of the USA PATRIOT Act of "[being] equally guilty of propagating competing myths in this debate, nowhere more so than with respect to Section 218 and the "wall." He agrees that the wall was not required by FISA, and maintains that section 218 was not sufficient to reduce barriers between information sharing amongst agencies – this, he says, was and remains a bureaucratic issue and not a statutory one. He blames the CIA not trusting the FBI, and believes that pre-Patriot Act FISA was not the cause of problems of communications between the two agencies. Cole's argument is that the primary purpose test applied to acquiring foreign intelligence information when undertaking surveillance was "simply sought to reduce the risk that FISA, which permits searches on less than criminal probable cause, would become an end run around the constitutional requirement of criminal probable cause for searches conducted for criminal law purposes" and that although a secondary criminal purpose may later arise, the agency firstly must primarily gain the order to gain foreign intelligence information. He also dismissed the claims that before section 218 was enacted possible terrorist prosecution was not possible, citing the prosecution of Sami Al-Arian by the U.S. DOJ, which used FISA wiretaps undertaken before the Patriot Act was enacted, which fell under the pre-Patriot FISA law. He also attacks suggestions that when an investigation turned from foreign intelligence to a primarily criminal investigation then a wiretap would need to be taken down, instead positing that once it became criminal "government agents would simply have to satisfy the standards applicable to criminal investigations – namely, by showing that they had probable cause that the tap would reveal evidence of criminal conduct... [and t]he tap or the search would then continue".

Cole believes that the FISA is based on an untested (by the U.S. Supreme Court) assumption that FISA searches can be performed under a lower showing of suspicion than would be mandated for criminal searches. He believes that the term "foreign power" is broad enough to "[encompass] any political organization comprised of a majority of non-citizens", and though they must show reasonable evidence of a crime when targeting a U.S. citizen, the agency must only show evidence that a foreign person is an agent of a foreign power. He states that FISA was based on an "administrative search" exception to the Fourth Amendment, which relaxed the probable cause requirement for searches "where the search serves some special need beyond criminal law enforcement". However, Cole believes that the administrative search exception does not apply to criminal law enforcement, therefore when an investigation turns into a primarily criminal investigation the traditional standards of criminal probable cause would then apply. The crux of Cole's argument is that,

[b]y abandoning that distinction and allowing searches on less than probable cause where the government is primarily seeking criminal prosecution, Section 218 raises a serious constitutional question. Thus, Section 218 was not only unnecessary to bring down the wall, but may render FISA unconstitutional.

Cole believes that section 218 makes it more likely "that information obtained through FISA wiretaps and searches will be used against defendants in criminal cases", and suggests that criminal defendants or their cleared counsel should be able to review "the initial application for the FISA wiretap or search when contesting the admissibility of evidence obtained through a FISA search" using "[a]n amendment requiring disclosure of FISA applications where evidence is sought to be used in a criminal trial would encourage adherence to the law by putting federal officials on notice that at some point the legality of the FISA warrant would be subjected to adversarial testing". Confidentiality could be kept by limiting access to the information to cleared council or by applying the restrictions of the Classified Information Procedures Act.

McCarthy totally disagreed with everything Cole said, stating that "It is apt that Professor David Cole begins the title of his response 'Imaginary Walls[.]' His submission is largely imaginary, creating rather than relating 'myths' about the structural impediments to good intelligence that plagued the pre-9/11 world." He believes that Cole's whole argument is pinned to the belief that FISA in unconstitutional, something McCarthy totally disagreed with. In McCarthy's mind, Cole's objection to FISA is that he believes, incorrectly, that under the Fourth Amendment searches are "inappropriate absent probable cause of a crime". He argues that Cole is wrong when he states that FISA requires a lower standard of suspicion to authorize searches, but rather it requires a different standard than is required of criminal searches. McCarthy says Cole's "suggestion that a 'foreign power' under FISA could be any 'political organization' comprised predominantly of non-citizens is overwrought", and that only those organizations proven to be engaged in clandestine operations will be targeted. He also says that Cole is wrong in that under FISA government searches and surveillance were never restricted to searches whose primary purpose was intelligence gathering, and therefore section 218 is not constitutionally suspect. McCarthy says that though the enforcing of a wall between criminal and foreign investigations under FISA was a misunderstanding by the U.S. DOJ, the reality was that the misunderstanding of the Act did not mean that structural restrictions were not established. He ends by stating that "[n]o one claims the wall tainted the propriety of intelligence gathering. It blocked sharing of the intelligence gathered. That is the bureaucratic monstrosity dismantled by Section 218... Without that clarification of law, the disastrous primary purpose doctrine would be undisturbed, the unnecessary wall would still be in place, dots would remain unconnected, prosecutions like al-Arian would not have occurred, and the United States would be at considerably greater risk."

In his final response, Cole defended himself, stating that his argument about the constitutionality of section 218 was because it "deprives FISA of its constitutional justification" — previously, he says, FISA searches were justified without reasonable cause justifications because they fell under an "administrative search" exception in the constitution. However, Cole says that the Supreme Court has held that this "does not apply where the government's purpose is criminal law enforcement". Now that the Patriot Act makes foreign intelligence gathering the significant and not sole reason for FISA searches, allowing for criminal searches under FISA, Cole believes that such searches would then by on constitutionally shaky ground. Cole argues that McCarthy's argument is based on a false premise: that section 218 is constitutional because, in McCarthy's words, "[it] mandat[es] that intelligence gathering be "a primary purpose," [and] constrains the government in a way that neither the Fourth Amendment nor FISA does". Cole disputes this, and says that "the very purpose of Section 218 was to eliminate the 'primary purpose' requirement". Cole also believes that McCarthy is wrong when he asserts that FISA targets only those "foreign powers" engaged in intelligence gathering, sabotage or international terrorism (McCarthy cited 50 U.S.C. § 1801(b)(2)(A), (C)). Cole cites 50 U.S.C. § 1801(a)(5), where FISA defines a "foreign power" as "a foreign-based political organization, not substantially composed of United States persons." and defines an "agent" of a foreign power to be those who are "an officer or employee of a foreign power." This, he says, is too broad, giving the example where a "British citizen working here as an employee of Amnesty International is an 'agent of a foreign power.'". Cole finally points out that McCarthy does not address his suggestion that "[FISA] should be amended to permit defendants in those prosecutions access to the FISA applications to challenge the warrant's validity".

=== Electronic Privacy Information Center ===
EPIC has criticized numerous sections of the title. The main thrust of their argument is that the Act does not provide a system of checks and balances to safeguard civil liberties in the face of significantly increase powers of surveillance and investigative powers for law enforcement agencies in the United States. They criticize:

- Section 203, which gives authorities the ability to share information regarding criminal activity. They specifically believe that the section will not limit disclosure to information relating to investigations of terrorist activities, mainly because the term "foreign intelligence information" is too vague.
- Section 206, a section that allows for "roving surveillance" of a target whose actions may have the effect of thwarting the identification of a particular person, is criticized for being too broad in scope and that the privacy of citizens is eroded. They are in particular concerned about those who use the Internet through public facilities such as libraries, university computer labs and cybercafes, as the FBI may monitor any facility that the target may be using, and do not have to specify which facility they are monitoring. They believe that this violates the Fourth Amendment, which specifies that search warrants must specify the place being searched.
- Section 213 (the "sneak and peek" section), which allows a court to delay the notification of a search warrant. EPIC claims that delayed notifications were only done in a limited number of cases prior to the Patriot Act and that "[applying] this extraordinary authority to all searches constitutes a radical departure from Fourth Amendment standards and could result in routine surreptitious entries by law enforcement agents."
- Section 214, which deals with pen register and trap and trace authorities, as they believe that the section takes away the "statutory requirement that the government prove the surveillance target is "an agent of a 'foreign power'" and as such "the amendment significantly eviscerates the constitutional rationale for the relatively lax requirements that apply to foreign intelligence surveillance... The removal of the 'foreign power' predicate for pen register/trap and trace surveillance upsets that delicate balance.".
- Section 216, which deals with the authority to issue pen registers and trace devices and contend that "the statutory definitions are vague with respect to the types of information that can be captured and are subject to broad interpretations". They are not impressed with the section's specific exclusion of the contents of such communications, because this is defined in 18 U.S.C. § 2510(8) as "[including] any information concerning the substance, purport, or meaning of that communication". They say that it "does not adequately take into account the unique nature of information captured electronically, which contains data far more revealing than phone numbers, such as URLs generated while using the Web (which often contain a great deal of information that cannot in any way be analogized to a telephone number)". They also say that "availability of nationwide orders for the interception and collection of electronic evidence would remove an important legal safeguard by making it more difficult for a distant service provider to appear before the issuing court and object to legal or procedural defects". Section 220, which deals with nationwide service of search warrants for electronic evidence, is similarly criticized.
- Section 217, which deals with the interception of computer trespasser communications, has "little, if anything, to do with legitimate investigations of terrorism".
- Section 218, where it is now the "significant purpose" of national security and defense based surveillance to gather foreign intelligence information, they criticized the wording of "Significant" as undefined and vague, and believe that this "could lead to inconsistent determinations and potential overuse of the FISA standards."

EPIC also singled out Section 205, which allows the director of the FBI to employ translators, and section 208, which increases the number of Federal judges that can review surveillance orders from seven to eleven as "commendable in their efforts to aid the government in preventing terrorist acts while maintaining a system checking intrusion onto citizens' civil liberties".

=== American Civil Liberties Union ===
The ACLU, an advocate of both free speech and also personal privacy has objected strongly to the Patriot Act, claiming it is flawed and violates a number of personal freedoms. "There are significant flaws in the Patriot Act, flaws that threaten your fundamental freedoms by giving the government the power to access to your medical records, tax records, information about the books you buy or borrow without probable cause, and the power to break into your home and conduct secret searches without telling you for weeks, months, or indefinitely."

Though the ACLU does not largely name specific sections, generally speaking they:

- Oppose the increased ability of the government to gather records held by a third party about a U.S. citizen's activities (they refer to Section 215). They say that the government has been given too much unchecked power. They believe that the government no longer has to show evidence that the subjects of search orders are an agent of a foreign power, that the FBI does not have to show probable cause to gain access to private information, that judicial oversight of the new powers given to agencies by the Patriot Act is almost non-existent, that surveillance orders can be based in part on a person's First Amendment activities and that when orders are given they are done ex parte and in camera.
- Believe the Act unconstitutionally amends the Federal Rules of Criminal Procedure to allow the government to conduct searches without notifying the subjects, at least until long after the search has been executed (cf. section 213)
- Believe that under the Patriot Act, the FBI can secretly conduct a physical search or wiretap on U.S. citizens to obtain evidence of crime without proving probable cause, as the Fourth Amendment explicitly requires. (cf. section 216)
- Oppose the expansion of pen register laws (cf. section 216). They believe that the Wiretap Act specifically details the use of pen registers with regards to telephone wiretaps, and was never meant for more modern communication, such as surveillance of websurfing. They oppose roving surveillance (cf section 206) and the nationwide authorisation of surveillance (cf. section 220) "because a judge cannot meaningfully monitor the extent to which his or her order is being used".

=== Electronic Frontier Foundation ===
The EFF has been scathing in its criticism of the Patriot Act. They have stated that "while containing some sections that seem appropriate—providing for victims of the September 11 attacks, increasing translation facilities and increasing forensic cybercrime capabilities—it seems clear that the vast majority of the sections included were not carefully studied by Congress, nor was sufficient time taken to debate it or to hear testimony from experts outside of law enforcement in the fields where it makes major changes" and that "[many provisions] are aimed at nonviolent, domestic crime... [and] although many of the provisions facially appear aimed at terrorism, the Government made no showing that the reasons they failed to detect the planning of the recent attacks or any other terrorist attacks were the civil liberties compromised with the passage of PATRIOT." They have also criticized the addition of computer crimes to the list of acts deemed to be terrorist related.

The EFF have criticized:

- Section 201, in combination with section 805 which deals with the material support of terrorism. The EFF believes that U.S. citizens should be allowed to support an organization deemed as terrorist, if only to support them in non-terrorist activities. One example they cite of potential problems with section 805 is that citizens would not have been able to support the African National Congress (ANC) during apartheid, as they believe they would be classed as a terrorist organization. Further examples are of a humanitarian social worker being unable to train Hamas members how to care for civilian children orphaned in the conflict between Israelis and Palestinians or a lawyer could not teach IRA members about international law, or peace workers offering training in effective peace negotiations or how to petition the United Nations regarding human rights abuses. The EFF, however, does not oppose section 201 on its own and believes that the section that should be repealed is section 805.
- Section 202 and section 217, which both deal with the approval of intercept orders for the investigation of computer crimes. The EFF believes that this section should sunset because the Congress passed the section without having to "cite even a single instance in which a computer-crime investigation—much less a terrorism investigation—had been hindered due to lack of surveillance authority."
- Section 204, which amended FISA to allow the acquisition of foreign intelligence information from non-U.S. source via a variety of measures, has been criticized as removing safeguards against unchecked surveillance. The EFF has stated that "Congress forgot to clarify that the US could also ignore pen-trap laws when the information is gathered outside the country". They hold that it shows that "204 really clarified was just how bad the rest of the law was even before the USA PATRIOT Act passed, and how government surveillance of international communications is dangerously unregulated", and cite ECHELON as an example of a system out of control. Section 204 modified 18 U.S.C. § 2511(2)(f) to include chapter 206 of the US Code (which deals with the regulation of pen registers and trap and trace devices) and includes electronic devices in the list of devices that agencies can intercept communications. The section in contention states that:
  Nothing contained in this chapter or chapter 121 [regulations that determines when and where stored communications and transactions can be accessed] or 206 of this title, or section 705 of the Communications Act of 1934 [disallows anyone who receives, assists with receiving, transmits, or assists in transmitting any interstate or foreign communication by wire or radio from divulging or publishing the contents of such communications, "except through authorized channels of transmission or reception"] shall be deemed to affect the acquisition by the United States Government of foreign intelligence information from international or foreign communications, or foreign intelligence activities conducted in accordance with otherwise applicable Federal law involving a foreign electronic communications system, utilizing a means other than electronic surveillance as defined in section 101 of the Foreign Intelligence Surveillance Act of 1978, and procedures in this chapter or chapter 121 and the Foreign Intelligence Surveillance Act of 1978 shall be the exclusive means by which electronic surveillance, as defined in section 101 of such Act, and the interception of domestic wire, oral, and electronic communications may be conducted.

The EFF believe that the Patriot Act should be repealed to fix what they say are abuses in the system. They believe that "strong public opposition to Section 204's expansion of international surveillance authority could send a message to Congress that the rest of the law needs fixing."

- Section 206, which allows for the roving surveillance of targets, and allows a government agency to require full assistance to perform such surveillance. The EFF objects to the law because they believe it "gives the FBI a 'blank check' to violate the communications privacy of countless innocent Americans". They believe that because there is a lower legal standard for FISA wiretaps it will lead to abuses of the fourth amendment rights of U.S. citizens. The EFF states that "the FBI can wiretap every single phone line, mobile communications device or Internet connection that a suspect might be using, without ever having to identify the suspect by name... for up to a year." The section in question, 205, amended 50 U.S.C. § 1805(c)(2)(B) by inserting 'or in circumstances where the Court finds that the actions of the target of the application may have the effect of thwarting the identification of a specified person, such other persons,' after 'specified person'. It now reads:
  [An order approving an electronic surveillance under this section shall direct] that, upon the request of the applicant, a specified communication or other common carrier, landlord, custodian, or other specified person, or in circumstances where the Court finds that the actions of the target of the application may have the effect of thwarting the identification of a specified person, such other persons, furnish the applicant forthwith all information, facilities, or technical assistance necessary to accomplish the electronic surveillance in such a manner as will protect its secrecy and produce a minimum of interference with the services that such carrier, landlord, custodian, or other person is providing that target of electronic surveillance

Section 207 is the section that allows for extensions of up to a year for surveillance of agents of a foreign power (and not U.S. citizens).

- Section 207 extended the duration of surveillance orders against agents of a foreign power from 45 days to 90 days, and physical search orders to up to 120 days, with court extensions for up to a period of one year. The EFF believe that criminal wiretaps were generous enough already, and there was no need to increase the duration of surveillance. They also believe that there is a lower legal standard for probable cause for FISA based surveillance orders and that the section dangerously removes safeguards against the abuse of such orders. However, the extensions to the duration of FISA surveillance orders detailed in section 207 only applies to orders taken out against foreign agents, and not to U.S. citizens. The EFF believes that:

PATRIOT 207's extension of the FISA time limits is an unnecessary expansion of power with only one clear "benefit": it reduces the amount of paperwork the FBI has to do in order to maintain continuous surveillance. However, that paperwork is far from busy work—it's a procedural check on government surveillance required by the Constitution. Needlessly reducing such checks on secret police power doesn't make us safer from terrorism. Instead, it makes us less safe from government abuse of that power.

- Section 209, which removed the need for the government to apply for a Title III wiretap order to open voicemail. The EFF points out that to gain access to voicemail an order will now be based on the Electronic Communications Privacy Act (ECPA), which they say gives much less "protection from government spying". They state the following:
  - Before PATRIOT, the FBI could gain access to your voice mail only by showing facts to a judge that demonstrate "probable cause" to believe that you are committing a crime. Now it need only demonstrate "reasonable grounds" for the search to get a court order—or, if it uses a subpoena, mere "relevance" to an investigation.
  - Before PATRIOT, the FBI eventually had to notify you if it listened to your voice mail messages. Now if they use a search warrant, the only way you'll find out is if the FBI uses your voice mail against you in court.
  - Before PATRIOT, the FBI could listen to your voice mail only if you were suspected of one of a limited number of serious crimes. Now it can gain access to your voice mail messages for any kind of criminal investigation whatsoever.
  - Before PATRIOT, if the FBI listened to your voice mail illegally, it couldn't use the messages as evidence against you—this is the so-called exclusionary rule. But the ECPA has no such rule, so even if the FBI gains access to your voice mail in violation of the statute, it can freely use it as evidence against you.
  In stripping these key privacy protections from your voice mail, PATRIOT is in possible violation of the Fourth Amendment to the U.S. Constitution.
- Section 212, which allows the emergency disclosure of electronic communications to protect life and limb, because they believe that an ISP or phone company should not be able hand over an individual's private records and messages, without their consent or knowledge, to any law enforcement agent on the belief that there would be immediate danger of death or serious physical injury required it to do so. They further protest section 225 of the Homeland Security Act of 2002 (otherwise known as the Cyber Security Enhancement Act of 2002, which repealed and replaced section 212 of the Patriot Act), as they believe that this expands the Patriot Act's section 212.
- Section 214, which amended the parts of FISA that deal with pen registers and trap and trace devices, because they believe that originally under FISA, court orders brought before the court were limited to the investigation of foreign threats to national security. They believe that the amendment broadens this to include U.S. citizens and "there's no way for citizens to know how often FISA pen-traps are authorized, whether and to what extent they're being used to spy on Internet communications, or how the court interprets the distinction between communications content and non-content when it comes to Internet communications." They also criticize the amendment for being too vague in specifying what can and can't be trapped (trap and trace and pen registers are only meant to determine data about the nature of communications, not the contents of the communications themselves).
- Section 215, possibly one of the most controversial sections of the Patriot Act because it expands the ability of a government agency to gain access to records and other items under FISA—though investigations must not be performed on U.S. citizens who are carrying out activities protected by the First Amendment to the Constitution of the United States. The EFF believe that it allows the U.S. government to violate the 4th amendment rights of U.S. citizens to privacy, without even having to show probable cause that the records are needed in the investigation. They have stated that:
  ...under Section 215 the FBI can investigate United States persons (citizens and legal residents) based at least in part on their exercise of First Amendment rights, and can investigate non-U.S. persons based solely on their free speech activities or religious practices. You could be investigated based on the political or religious meetings you attend, the websites you visit or even the books that you read. As a result, Americans may be chilled from exercising these Constitutional rights. Already, attendance at and donations to mosques have dropped significantly, as many Muslims reasonably fear that they will be targeted for investigation based solely on their religious beliefs.

The EFF also objects to the fact that a FISA surveillance order leaves a U.S. citizen with no means to go to court and challenge its legality.

- Section 220, which gives the power to Federal courts to issue nationwide service of search warrants for electronic surveillance. The EFF believe that it should not have been included into the Patriot Act as it deals with criminal cases as well as dealing with terrorism, something they believe that should not have been specified in the Act, "despite the fact that PATRIOT was sold to the American public as a necessary anti-terrorism measure." They believe that agencies will be able to "'shop' for judges that have demonstrated a strong bias toward law enforcement with regard to search warrants, using only those judges least likely to say no—even if the warrant doesn't satisfy the strict requirements of the Fourth Amendment to the Constitution", and that it reduces the likelihood that smaller ISPs or phone companies will try to protect the privacy of their clients by challenging the warrant in court – their reasoning is that "a small San Francisco ISP served with such a warrant is unlikely to have the resources to appear before the New York court that issued it." They believe that this is bad because only the communications provider will be able to challenge the warrant as only they will know about it—many warrants are issued ex parte, which means that the party it is made out against will not need to be present when the order is issued.
- Section 223, which allows for civil liability against those who make unauthorized disclosures of communication. According to the EFF they originally praised this section, however they now believe that it is "a legislative trojan horse [and] the few checks and balances that 223 obviously added to the law blinded us to the ones it subtly removed." The EFF's reasoning is as follows:
  - You can no longer sue the government for "intentional" violations of the law, like you can sue everyone else. Instead, the violation has to be "willful," a much higher standard.
  - Before, you could get a trial in front of a jury if you sued the government. Now, suits against the government are heard only by a judge.
  - Unlike with any other defendant, if you want to sue the federal government for illegal wiretapping you have to first go through an administrative procedure with the agency that did the wiretapping. That means, essentially, that you have to politely complain to the illegal wiretappers and tip them off to your legal strategy, and then wait for a while as they decide whether to do anything about it before you can sue them in court.
  - Before PATRIOT, in addition to being able to sue for money damages, you could sue for declaratory relief from a judge. For example, an Internet service provider could ask the court to declare that a particular type of wiretapping that the government wants to do on its network is illegal. One could also sue for an injunction from the court, ordering that any illegal wiretapping stop. PATRIOT section 223 significantly reduced a judge's ability to remedy unlawful surveillance, making it so you can only sue the government for money damages. This means, for example, that no one could sue the government to stop an ongoing illegal wiretap. At best, one could sue for the government to pay damages while the illegal tap continued!
- Section 225, which gives legal immunity to those who assist the government in undertaking surveillance that is in accordance with a court order or request for emergency assistance. The EFF believe that with "the lack of any procedure to challenge a FISA order, the never-ending gag order that forever bans you from telling anyone, the secret court that won't listen to your arguments—it's just another incentive for ISPs and phone companies to bend to the demands of the Justice Department or the FISA Court, even when the demand is legally questionable."

=== American Library Association ===
The American Library Association strongly objects to section 215. In a resolution passed on June 29, 2005 they stated that "Section 215 of the USA PATRIOT Act allows the government to secretly request and obtain library records for large numbers of individuals without any reason to believe they are involved in illegal activity". They resolved:

- to urge the Senate, in the FY 2006 Senate Commerce-Justice-State appropriations bill, to bar the use of appropriated funds by the Justice Department to search library and bookstore records under Section 215 of the USA PATRIOT Act;
- to urge the United States Congress to pass legislation that restores the privacy rights of library users;
- to oppose any initiatives on the part of the United States government to constrain the free expression of ideas or to inhibit the use of libraries as represented in the USA PATRIOT Act expansion bill, which they believe to be marked-up in secret by the Senate Select Committee on Intelligence;
- to urge librarians and other library workers, trustees and advocates throughout the country to continue their efforts to educate their users on the impact of Sections 215 and 505 of the USA PATRIOT Act on libraries.

Their stance did not go without criticism. One prominent critic of the ALA's stance was the Manhattan Institute's Heather Mac Donald, who stated in an article for the City Journal that "[t]he furor over section 215 is a case study in Patriot Act fear-mongering."

=== United States Government ===
In response to its many critics, and in response to the many criticisms of the Patriot Act, the U.S. government set up a website, lifeandliberty.gov, devoted to responding to criticism. This website no longer exists; however, when it did, they devoted a page to what they believed to be myths perpetuated by the ACLU and stated that "Congress simply took existing legal principles and retrofitted them to preserve the lives and liberty of the American people from the challenges posed by a global terrorist network." They defended:

- Section 203, which allowed Federal authorities to share information brought before a grand jury. They believe that the ability to share such information allows investigators to "connect the dots". They give the example of how a federal grand jury indicted Sami al-Arian for allegedly being the U.S. leader of the Palestinian Islamic Jihad, which they state to be "one of the world's most violent terrorist outfits"
- Section 206, the roving surveillance authority, stating that it was enacted because "international terrorists are sophisticated and trained to thwart surveillance by rapidly changing locations and communication devices such as cell phones, the Act authorized agents to seek court permission to use the same techniques in national security investigations to track terrorists"
- Section 213, the ability to delay search warrant notifications. Specifically, they state that "in some cases if criminals are tipped off too early to an investigation, they might flee, destroy evidence, intimidate or kill witnesses, cut off contact with associates, or take other action to evade arrest", and say that they have "been used for decades, have proven crucial in drug and organized crime cases, and have been upheld by courts as fully constitutional."
- Section 215, which gave the government increased powers to gain access to records to assist in terrorist investigations. They justify the increased powers because they say that examining business records is a crucial part of investigating terrorist cases and that "law enforcement authorities have always been able to obtain business records in criminal cases through grand jury subpoenas, and continue to do so in national security cases where appropriate." They use the specific example of the 1990 Zodiac gunman Heriberto Seda, where they state that authorities used library records to a Scottish occult poet, and wanted to learn who had checked the poet's books out of the library.
- Section 219, which gives single-jurisdiction of search warrants for terrorism. According to the government "modern terrorism investigations often span a number of districts, and officers therefore had to obtain multiple warrants in multiple jurisdictions, creating unnecessary delays", and they believe that investigations have been streamlined by this section.
