= Patriot Debates =

The American Bar Association passed resolutions on the USA PATRIOT Act that asked the U.S. Government "to conduct a thorough review of the implementation of the powers granted to the Executive Branch under the Act before considering legislation that would extend or further expand such powers ...." and "to conduct regular and timely oversight including public hearings ... to ensure that government investigations undertaken pursuant to the Foreign Intelligence Surveillance Act ... do not violate the First, Fourth, and Fifth Amendments of the Constitution ...." They also set up a website to discuss issues in relation to the Act, and thus the Patriot Debates were born, where various people debated specific sections.

== Title II ==
=== Section 203 ===
Kate Martin argued that section 203 and 905 should be modified. She believes that

While effective counterterrorism requires that agencies share relevant information, congressional efforts have uniformly failed to address the real difficulties in such sharing: How to determine what information is useful for counterterrorism; how to determine what information would be useful if shared; how to identify whom it would be useful to share it with; and how to ensure that useful and relevant information is timely recognized and acted upon. To the contrary, the legislative approach – which can fairly be summarized as share everything with everyone – can be counted on to obscure and make more difficult the real challenge of information sharing.

She believes that there was no existing "wall" that separated information sharing between agencies, and believes that the problem with information sharing was that the FBI didn't know the information that was available to the CIA, and vice versa. She further criticised section 905, which required the sharing of all information that would jeopardize an ongoing law enforcement investigation or impair other significant law enforcement interests. Her criticism was that, "over the objections of civil liberties groups and some Democratic senators", the Act fails to discriminate between information gathered between terrorist and non-terrorist investigations. Therefore, she argues, no safeguards or standards are in place in the Patriot Act that apply to the use of such information.

Martin believes that the Act should be modified to include some privacy safeguards: before information is gathered she believes that the court should approve the information transfer to make sure that it is necessary for ongoing activities by the agencies involved; that information shared should be limited to information relevant to investigations into terrorism; that only those people who have access to such information should actually need it to do their jobs (currently those who are not directly related to the investigation can gain access to the information); and information gathered should be marked as confidential and measures put into place to stop the inappropriate dissemination of such information.

Viet Dinh disagreed with Martin's analysis. He gave the example of the Lackawanna Six, a group of six al Qaeda operatives who operated in Lackawanna, New York. Both the FBI and CIA investigated them when they determined that they had travelled to Afghanistan to train for terrorist activities. According to Dinh, "the two squads operated independently in the following months, often prohibited from even standing in the same room during briefings to discuss their respective cases. Thus, investigators on both sides were unable to obtain a complete picture of either the terrorist or the criminal activity." However, after section 203 came into effect, they were able to communicate together effectively and as a result, five of the six suspects pleaded guilty to providing material support to al Qaeda, and the sixth pleaded guilty to conducting transactions unlawfully with al Qaeda. He also disagrees with Martin's assertion that information should be gated through a judge before being communicated to other agencies, stating that "if a federal prosecutor learned during grand jury testimony that terrorists were planning to detonate a bomb in Manhattan in the next 30 minutes, Federal Rule of Criminal Procedure 6(e) prevented him from immediately notifying national security officials not directly participating in the investigation." Dinh believes that Congress had to balance the rights of citizens to privacy with the threat of a terrorist attack and that appropriate safeguards were implemented — whenever grand jury information is shared, the government is required to notify the supervising court and identify the departments that received it. He also explains that section 203 of the Act expressly limits disclosure to foreign intelligence information, which is limited to threats from abroad, and disputes the assertion that all information is required to be shared between agencies.

However, Martin responded that the information sharing between agencies in regards to the Lakwana Six investigation was not impeded before the introduction of section 203, and that instead it was the agencies' misreading of FISA. She also states that his "hypothetical grand jury testimony about a bomb in New York was anticipated by the Clinton Justice Department, whose Office of Legal Counsel opined in 1993 and 1997 that under then existing law, prosecutors would be free to disclose such information to national security officials even without prior judicial approval", She further reiterated that there is no reason why modest privacy safeguards should not be put into place.

In his final response, Dinh wrote that,

Ms. Martin's response underestimates the tools necessary to prevent and detect complex webs of terrorist activity. In particular, her contention that all shared information should be first established as terrorism-related information underscores the very crux of the problem—the full relevance of information is often only apparent after information is shared between criminal and intelligence investigations. You cannot connect the dots before all the dots are even on the drawing board.

He concedes that while FISA allowed for information sharing, it was such a convoluted process that "agents frequently hesitated from working openly with other government entities", and that section 203 has greatly expedited the information sharing between agencies.

=== Section 206 ===
James X. Dempsey argued that Section 206, which allows for roving surveillance under FISA, was reasonable considering that investigators already had the ability to perform roving surveillance in criminal cases. However, he says that "as with so many provisions of the PATRIOT Act, the concern with Section 206 is not with the authority itself [but] rather, the issue is the lack of adequate checks and balances". Dempsey believes that the section lacks two important safeguards that are present in the corresponding legislation for criminal investigations: 1) that agents actually ascertain the location of the suspect before turning on their recording devices, and 2) that "some additional changes to FISA adopted outside of the normal process in the Intelligence Authorization Act a few months after the PATRIOT Act had the probably unintended effect of seeming to authorize "John Doe" roving taps – that is, FISA orders that identify neither the target nor the location of the interception.".

He believes that an ascertainment requirement should be added to the FISA roving tap authority in 50 U.S.C. § 1805(c) to require that "in cases where the facility or place at which the surveillance is to be directed is not known at the time the order is issued, the surveillance be conducted only when the presence of the target at a particular facility or place has been ascertained by the person conducting the surveillance.", which is part of the SAFE Act.

Dempsey also believes as a result of changes made "outside the scope" of the FY 2002 intelligence authorization bill conference that changes made to 50 U.S.C. § 1805(c)(1)(A), "seems to allow applications and orders that specify neither the person nor the location to be tapped" under FISA. Of this he says:

This is unprecedented, probably unintended, and probably unconstitutional. It permits the FISA court to issue a wiretap order authorizing the FBI to listen in on a telephone or e-mail conversation of a person not named in the order, at any telephone or computer the unnamed person might use.

He believes that it should be corrected to state that either the target or place be specified in the surveillance order. This would close off the loophole that neither the target or place be specified in the surveillance order, as is currently specified in FISA. Dempsey criticises as vague the approach taken by John Ashcroft, who Dempsey cites as saying, in a letter to Orrin Hatch, that a description must be added to the surveillance order. Dempsey finds this vague as the term "description" is not defined in FISA and could allow the U.S. Department of Justice to use a description of a "20- to 35-year-old Arab male", which could potentially specify thousands of U.S. citizens.

Dempsey also believes that the law should be changed so that those under surveillance via FISA should also be notified after surveillance has ceased, so that those wrongly targeted and placed under surveillance can challenge the government's actions.

Paul Rosenzweig disagreed with Dempsey's premise that "relaxation of the particularity requirement is constitutionally suspect" and believed that it colored his argument that section 206 should be modified. Rosenzweig believes that the addition of an ascertainment requirement and the requirement that the identification of individuals should be more specific "seem unnecessary and unwise". He believes that the proposed ascertainment requirement would unnecessarily burden the ability of law enforcement and intelligence agents to perform surveillance on terrorist suspects. He believes that while opponents of section 206 focus on those who are innocent and yet who are the target of surveillance, this needs to be balanced with the view of those who are "concerned that during the delay while an ascertainment is being made, or in circumstances where an ascertainment is uncertain, vital terrorism intelligence will be lost". He believes that "while the balance struck by the ascertainment requirement may make sense in the traditional criminal context, it makes less sense in the context of terrorism investigations", arguing that there are already existing safeguards in place: an authorisation may only be done on those where there is probable cause that they are "a foreign power or an agent of a foreign power" and that there is probable cause that the facilities or places where surveillance is taking place is being used by a foreign power or an agent of a foreign power. He also says that "these requirements are subject to both administrative and judicial scrutiny prior to authorization". Rosenzweig further objects to the proposed ascertainment requirement because he believes that "it imposes a narrow law enforcement paradigm on the efforts to combat terrorism", a paradigm that he believes does not make sense in investigations of international terrorism, particularly in light of the September 11 terrorist attacks on the World Trade Center.

Rosenzweig believes that the proposal to make it mandatory to name specific individuals in a surveillance order, or if this is not possible then having the surveillance order name the location or place that is to be under surveillance would give rise to situations that "in certain circumstances, intelligence agents might be unable to secure a warrant to conduct electronic surveillance because of the indefiniteness of their information." Rosenzweig stated that adding a requirement to specify a location that roving surveillance will be undertaken is a non sequitur. His reasoning is that the whole point of roving surveillance is that agencies cannot know for certain in what location surveillance will be undertaken and besides which the targets of surveillance will often try to thwart surveillance through such means as using "throw away" mobile phones, and other such measures. He also argues that terrorists are more slippery than even drug dealers, often taking on the identity of other real-world individuals, and thus intelligence agencies will only have an alias or aliases — or in some cases on a physical description or even just a pattern of behaviour — of a terrorist. He believes that the requirement to precisely identify the individual limits the effectiveness of roving surveillance when used in a terrorism investigation.

The final plank in Rosenzweig's counter-argument is that even under the scrutiny of the courts, Congress and the Department of Justice no abuses have been detected under section 206, and that "even [the Patriot Act's] most ardent critics must admit that they are basing their legislative proposals on the fear of potential abuse rather than reality of actual abuse."

Dempsey responded by arguing that Rosensweig confuses "the principles applicable at the trial stage of a criminal case with the much looser rules applicable at the investigative stage" when he argued that criminal standards do not apply to terrorism investigations. He argues that he is not saying that such criminal standards should be applied to terrorism investigations, but that instead criminal and terrorism investigations must be firmly based on the constitutional requirement of particularity in surveillance orders. He further reiterated his belief in the ascertainment requirement, that "the purpose of roving taps is to follow the bad guy, so unless the bad guy is being followed, the roving tap cannot and should not be activated." He says that Rosensweig "presents a false choice between fighting terrorism, on the one hand, and preserving the civil liberties of innocent people on the other" and that checks and balances are there not only to protect government interference with the innocent, but also to force them focus on the reasons behind their surveillance, which he argues strengthens their ability to do their job instead of hindering them. Dempsey further stated that Rosenzweig did not really articulate why the ascertainment requirement would be particularly onerous to intelligence agencies and that "without additional safeguards, Section 206 roving tap orders are little different from the "general warrants" that the Fourth Amendment prohibits."

Rosenzweig's final answer was to challenge Dempsey's assertion that he had argued a false choice between fighting terrorism and the protection of civil liberties, instead stating that "the right answer is to seek to maximize both values to the extent it is possible". He argues that the ascertainment requirement in criminal law is defined in 18 U.S.C. § 2518(12) and is limited to oral communication, and does not apply to the interception of wire or electronic communications. Thus, he argues, the addition of an ascertainment requirement to electronic surveillance would be the addition of a completely new interpretation of the requirement and would actual hinder criminal and terrorism investigations. He further argues that the existing safeguards of minimisation — limiting what can be done under surveillance while surveillance is ongoing — is far better than a safeguard based on ascertainment, which relies on suppositions regarding future events. He believes that the "uncertainty of ascertainment will cause hesitancy in the initiation of an interception [and] through the gap created by that hesitancy will flow terrorist communications".

=== Sections 209, 212, and 220 ===
James X. Dempsey believed that even minor titles such as section 209 — which deals with the seizure of voicemails through the use of a normal search warrant —, section 212, which allows for the emergency disclosure of electronic communications under certain circumstances — and section 220 — which allows for the nationwide service of search warrants for electronic evidence — were evidence of a steady "[expansion of] government power without corresponding improvements in the checks and balances applicable to those powers".

Dempsey disagreed with section 209, which made it no longer necessary for agencies to seize stored voicemail from a Title III wiretap order, because while he agree that it made the rules technology neutral (stored data does not require such an order) it unnecessarily overlooked the importance of notice under the Fourth Amendment and under Title III. He believes that there is no way to seek redress under the new provisions, as those who have an ordinary search warrant against them may never find out that their voicemail has been seized. He also argues that while Title III protections was to make up for the lack of notice, such notice need not be delayed when seizing voicemail as "the evidence is already created". Dempsey ultimately believes that "rather than allowing growing amounts of personal information to fall outside the traditional protections of the Fourth Amendment, it is time to revisit the rules for networked storage (whether of voice or data) and bring them more in line with traditional Fourth Amendment principles, by requiring contemporaneous notice as the norm and covering both newer records and older records (again, whether voice or data) under the same probable cause standard".

He argues that the now repealed section 212 and the similar current provision in the Homeland Security Act is not on the face of it unreasonable. However, he argues that while a service provider may deem that a particular communication is dangerous, they may deem this information to be dangerous when alerted to it by agencies. Thus, agencies could alert a service provider to a dangerous situation, and then the service provider would then invoke the provisions of the relevant act to provide the government agency about the communication. He believes this gives a means of agencies "cutting corners" and that "placing the reasonable belief on the part of the service provider diffuses responsibility: the stored records provisions to which this exception was added has no suppression rule for evidence improperly obtained, and it does not appear that the civil action and administrative discipline provisions of 18 U.S.C. § 2707 would apply to agents who even intentionally mislead a service provider about the existence of an emergency". Dempsey suggests several modifications to implement checks and balances into the section: make after-the-act judicial review mandatory, with the suppression of evidence which is not deemed to be properly justified; the mandatory disclosure to the person whose privacy has been invaded that their information has been provided to the government; and to "make it illegal for a government official to intentionally or recklessly mislead a service provider as to the existence of an emergency".

Dempsey agreed with EPIC's view of section 220, in that it would make it "more difficult for a distant service provider to appear before the issuing court and object to legal or procedural defects". He believes that one possible solution to this problem is to allow a warrant to be challenged in the district it was served as well as in the district it was issued. He also believes that judges should have a clear understanding of what is being sought and that "judges need to understand computer systems in order to fully enforce the specificity requirement of the Fourth Amendment in the digital context" and that "while notice under 18 U.S.C. § 2705(b) can be prohibited, judges should be hesitant to deny notice to the person to whom the records pertain, since the subscriber is really in the best position to raise legitimate concerns."

Orin S. Kerr also agreed with James Dempsey that the sections were uncontroversial, and he also argued they should be kept. He explains that Internet communications are not dealt with in the Fourth Amendment, which offers no protection to information disclosed to third parties "and gives those third parties unlimited power to search through documents in their possession and disclose the results to law enforcement." This gap, Kerr argues, triggered a need for Congressional regulation which was satisfied in 1986 by the passing of the Electronic Communications Privacy Act (ECPA) which placed limitations on information that may be voluntarily disclosed by ISPs, and on information that an ISP may be compelled to give to investigators. He says that "the basic goal of the statute is to create Fourth Amendment-like protections for Internet communications" and that sections 209, 212 and 220 are all amendments to the ECPA. However, Kerr argues that while the ECPA was a necessary piece of legislation, Congress overlooked three key things. One is exigent circumstances for the obtaining of records (he argues that the Fourth Amendment had such an exception for physical search and seizures). The second thing was that Title III provided a high level of protection for stored voicemail, but almost no privacy protection for opened voicemail; consequently "if the government knew that there was one copy of an unopened private message in a person's bedroom and another copy on their remotely stored voicemail, it was illegal for the FBI to simply obtain the voicemail; the law actually compelled the police to invade the home and rifle through peoples' bedrooms so as not to disturb the more private voicemail", and that the law made it extremely difficult for law enforcement agencies to gain access to such stored voicemail. Thirdly, Congress introduced "needless delay" when they disallowed federal investigators from obtaining orders to compel information in one district and have them served on third parties in other districts - before section 220 was introduced Kerr gives the example of a New York-based investigator having to travel to California to compel an ISP to disclose information about a New York-based defendant. Kerr argues that sections 209, 202 and 220 correct such defects in the ECPA and that "in all three cases, the Patriot Act attempts to bring the statutory surveillance law into alignment with the Fourth Amendment."

Kerr believes that "for the most part, Jim Dempsey's proposals for reform would impose greater privacy restrictions for online investigations than equivalent offline investigations". He believes that Dempsey's proposal to require after-the-act judicial review for exigent circumstances has no parallel in the Fourth Amendment; that allowing recipients of orders to challenge orders within the recipients own district would not follow "the traditional rule that any challenge (itself an extremely rare event) must be filed in the issuing district"; and that disclosure to the person whose electronic voicemail has been seized also has no such parallel in the Fourth Amendment, as while notice must be given to a home owner whose house is being searched this is not done to allow a challenge to the order but rather shows them that due legal process is being followed and that the search is not being conducted by a rogue agent — Kerr believes that "current law appears to satisfy this policy concern by providing notice to the ISP".

Kerr ends his response by writing:

This does not mean I necessarily disagree with Dempsey's proposals. I am interested in hearing more about some of them, and less enthusiastic about others. But I see Dempsey's proposals as parallel to the debate over Sections 209, 212, and 220, rather than as a direct challenge to those sections. All three provisions are balanced and appropriate efforts to match statutory laws to the Fourth Amendment. Whatever other proposals Congress wishes to consider beyond them, it should begin by reaffirming these uncontroversial sections of the Patriot Act.

In response, Dempsey agreed that Congress needed to respond to the Supreme Court's finding, made over 30 years ago, that the Constitution affords no privacy protection to personal information disclosed to third parties, but that their "dispute is over what further changes are necessary to respond to the flow of information out of the home and onto the Internet." He held to his original arguments about the sections and further reiterated that the "traditional" (his quotes) Fourth Amendment protection is notice that the government is seeking information about a citizen, and that the amendments to the ECPA do not provide enough transparency that such information is being sought from third parties. Kerr agreed with much of what Dempsey's analysis of what the problem is, but that his "own view is that [they] can be best addressed in two ways: first, by adding a statutory suppression remedy to the Internet surveillance laws; and second, by bolstering some of the privacy protections for accessed communications under the Stored Communications Act" Kerr believes that the right of government to access information about a person without notifying that person has not been a requirement for criminal investigations, and that "under current law, Internet users also have a narrow right to notice when the government seeks to obtain content records from an ISP with less than probable cause". He ended the debate by saying

Should this narrow right be expanded to include other kinds of government access to information stored by Internet service providers? Perhaps, perhaps not. The traditional rule against notice reflects a legitimate government interest: notice tips off the suspect as to the details of the investigation, and that notice can thwart the investigation. Notice can also add a paperwork requirement that ranges from minimal to substantial. At the same time, notice can provide a target with the information needed to challenge the government's procedure. My instinct is that the interest served by the notice requirement is best met instead by a statutory suppression remedy: a suppression remedy would require notice after criminal charges are brought, and permit defendants to challenge the government's procedure at that point. But if Congress does not wish to add a suppression remedy, greater notice requirements at the time of government access to information should be considered.

=== Section 213 ===
Heather Mac Donald argues that section 213, which provides for the so-called "sneak and peek" provisions of the Patriot Act, is necessary because the temporary delay in notification of a search order stops terrorists from tipping off their counterparts that they are being investigated. She says that claims that the section allows the government to conduct secret searches without notification from such organisations as the ACLU and the Century Foundation are wrong, and that "discredit the following strategies [(see below)] here and you have the key for discrediting the entire anti-Patriot propaganda machine" (headings are from Mac Donald):

- Conceal Legal Precedent: she says that delayed notification is not a new idea, and that to say otherwise "is a rank fabrication". She believes that the lack of uniformity in delayed notification laws slowed down investigations and that section 213 "codified existing case law under a single national standard to streamline detective work" and that it "did not create new authority regarding searches"
- Hide the Judge: she says that delayed notifications must be done with judicial approval but that she cannot find "any acknowledgement of these constitutional checks in the Patriot Act diatribes"
- Amend the Statute: she believes that "Anti-Patriot lore has it that section 213 allows the government to permanently conceal a search", which is not the case as section 213 specifically requires notice after a "reasonable" period of time
- Reject Secrecy: she believes that those "on the left and right who believe that the American people have no greater enemy than their own government", whom she implies believe in full transparency and no secrecy, are not able to answer how this protects the United States against terrorist attack and that "opponents of the Patriot Act have never explained how they think the government can track down the web of Islamist activity in public".

James X. Dempsey countered that section 213 was a "perfect example of a good idea gone too far". He argues that secrecy was already dealt when FISA was amended in 1994 to allow the government to carry out secret searches. He objects to the fact that section 213 as enacted is not limited to terrorism cases, and believes that,

...it would astound most Americans that government agents could enter their homes while they are asleep or their places of business while they are away and carry out a secret search or seizure and not tell them until weeks or months later. It would especially astound them that this authority is available for all federal offenses, ranging from weapons of mass destruction investigations to student loan cases. That is what Section 213 of the PATRIOT Act authorizes. Indeed, the Justice Department has admitted that it has used Section 213 sneak and peek authority in non-violent cases having nothing to do with terrorism. These include, according to the Justice Department's October 24, 2003 letter to Senator Stevens, an investigation of judicial corruption, where agents carried out a sneak and peek search of a judge's chambers, a fraudulent checks case, and a health care fraud investigation, which involved a sneak and peek of a home nursing care business.

Dempsey believes that the section confuses the law and was hastily cobbled together — his primary example is the reference to the definition of "adverse result", which he argues was unrelated with regards to the Patriot Act's purposes. He believes the definition is too broad and "offer little guidance to judges and will bring about no national uniformity in sneak and peek cases." He also believes that "reasonable period" is too vague and that it leaves judges with no uniform standard, and may leave courts outside the Ninth and Second Circuit the ability to make up their own rules. He also wonders why if sneak and peak orders are a "time-honored tool" used by courts for decades, then why it was necessary for the Justice Department to push to make section 213 applicable in all cases that such a measure is used. The answer Dempsey posits is that they were on shaky constitutional ground and that they were "trying to bolster it with Congressional action – even action by a Congress that thought it was voting on an anti-terrorism bill, not a general crimes bill." Dempsey's reasons for believing that they were on shaky ground was because although the 1986 United States v. Freitas, 800 F.2d 1451 (9th Cir.), and 1990, United States v. Villegas, 899 F.2d 1324 (2d Cir.) circuit opinions were premised on the assumption that notice was not an element of the Fourth Amendment, Wilson v. Arkansas, 514 U.S. 927 (1995) Justice Thomas of the Supreme Court found that notice is part of the Fourth Amendment.

In order to fix what he believes to be serious flaws in section 213, Dempsey proposes several changes be made to the section: the requirement for reasonable cause to be found by a judge be changed to be probable cause; that the section should not apply to every case of delayed notification; that Congress should require that any delay in notification not extend for more than seven days without additional judicial authorization; and that Congress should require that any delay in notification not extend for more than seven days without additional judicial authorization.

Mac Donald disagreed with everything that Dempsey said, stating that "Mr. Dempsey's response conforms flawlessly to the anti-Patriot act template. He relies on the two central tropes: Conceal Legal Precedent and Hide the Judge." She believes that Dempsey was saying that section 213 is a radical new power, where she says that it is not and is in fact a codification of federal precedents and she says have been authorised for decades. She says that "if such a law enforcement power is "astounding", Mr. Dempsey should have challenged those precedents long ago", and noted that "as an initial matter" Dempsey did not note that "agents can delay notice only after convincing a judge that notice would have an "adverse result", such as harm to an individual or witness intimidation." She also believes that it is irrelevant that section 213 is not just confined to terrorism, as the precedents that it codified were not confined to terrorism either. She further argues that it is perfectly reasonable to allow judges to make up their own rules when it comes to deciding what a "reasonable delay" is, and that Wilson v. Arkansas does not pose a threat to delayed notification of warrants, holding that the requirement of a probable cause standard for the judicial finding of an "adverse result" was already rejected in Richards v. Wisconsin, 520 U.S. 385 (1997). She further states that:

Mr. Dempsey thinks that "seriously jeopardizing" an investigation is not a valid reason to delay notice. This position offends common sense and is contrary to the law. U.S. v. John, 508 F.2d 1134 (8th Cir. 1975); cert. denied, 421 U.S. 962 (1975), found that ensuring the continued effectiveness of a criminal investigation satisfied the "good cause" requirement for delaying notice of a Title III wiretap under 18 U.S.C. § 2518(d).

Dempsey completely disagreed with Mac Donald's arguments, stating that "far from wanting to 'hide the judge,' supporters of a more balanced approach want to give judges clearer authority to approve secret searches when necessary while ensuring that the exception does not swallow the rule." He also pointed out that in Wilson v. Arkansas and Richards v. Wisconsin "the Court allowed an exception to [the prior notification of a search warrant], upon "reasonable suspicion," by allowing police to provide notice as they were entering when they faced a life-threatening situation or the destruction of evidence". He believes that "if 'reasonable suspicion' is the standard for delaying notice by minutes, probable cause should be the standard when notice is delayed for days or weeks."

Dempsey ended his comments by saying,

As noted, the Justice Department has reported to Congress on its use of Section 213. Codifying this practice would allow Congress and the public to assess in years to come if the standard is too strict or too liberal. The fact that a defender of the PATRIOT Act would oppose routine reporting on how it is working shows the unreasonableness of the "don't change a comma" position.

=== Sections 214 and 215 ===
Andrew C. McCarthy believed that sections 214 (deals with Pen Register and Trap and Trace Authority under FISA) and 215 (expanded what records could be accessed under FISA) should be retained. He argues that Federal Rule of Investigation 17(c) authorised the compulsory production of "any books, papers, documents, data, or other objects" to criminal investigators by mere subpoena, and so section 215 merely brought FISA into line with current criminal law. He also states that the records included in section 215 are records held by third parties, and therefore are exempt from a citizen's reasonable expectations of privacy. In light of this, McCarthy believes that there are three main reasons why the access to library records is not a problem: firstly he believes that the government has always had the authority to compel the reading of records by subpoena and there has been "no empirical indication of systematic prying into private choices – else we'd surely have heard from the robustly organized librarians"; secondly he believes that in the current information age that there is just too much information for inappropriate access to such records; and thirdly he believes that an a priori ban on the investigative access to the reading of records would be both unprecedented and wrong. He points out that "literature evidence was a staple of terrorism prosecutions throughout the 1990s" and that the reading of records has already led to convictions of terrorists.

McArthy also addresses the change to FISA surveillance orders; where before the government was required to provide "specific and articulable facts" to perform surveillance on an agent of a foreign power, now they must only specify that the records concerned are sought for an authorized investigation. However, he points out that it prohibits investigations that violate first amendment rights of citizens, which he says is not specified in the corresponding criminal procedures. McCarthy supports the changes made in section 215, but believes that emphasising that the order is court approved is not terribly productive as such an assertion implies "searching judicial review": if the government provides correct representation to the court then the court may not deny the order. He explains that this is not a problem, as the role of the judiciary is to "protect established constitutional interests, not create new ones as a means to micromanage investigations" and that "the order issues on the court's power, but it is not the judiciary's place to question bona fides of a co-equal branch carrying out its own constitutional function". The reason the judiciary authorises such orders is to make sure the executive branch is not abusing its powers and "by requiring the FBI to make solemn representations to the court, and mandating that the Attorney General report semi-annually on this provision's implementation, Section 215 provides suitable metrics for oversight and, if necessary, reform". Further, McCarthy argues that there are times when the FBI does not have any evidence to concretely prove that a person is involved in terrorism, but there are times when they have reason to believe that the individual or group are planning on or actually committing acts of terrorism — he cites the example of the FBI's investigation into Zacharias Moussaoui before the September 11 terrorist attacks; Moussaoui's flight school behavior aroused suspicion but there was no specific evidence to link him to terrorist activity.

McCarthy does believe that section 215 "should be amended to clarify that order recipients may move the FISA court to quash or narrow production", however he says that the US DOJ has already decided that this is implicit in the section so it is probably unnecessary. He believes that further amendment is unnecessary and unwise, as "raising the access bar would simply encourage government to proceed by grand jury subpoena or national security letter – guaranteeing less judicial participation, more difficult congressional oversight, and the inefficiency of quash litigation in district courts throughout the country, rather than in the FISA court".

On section 214, McCarthy believes that the pre-Patriot Act version of FISA, which required government agencies to "certify that the monitored communications would likely be those either of an international terrorist or spy involved in a violation of U.S. criminal law, or of an agent of a foreign power involved in terrorism or espionage" was "an unnecessary and imprudently high hurdle" as pen registers and wiretaps do not violate the Fourth Amendment. Therefore, he argues, "there is no constitutional reason to require investigators to seek court authorization for them at all". Thus McCarthy says, the amendments to FISA made by section 214 are "both modest and eminently reasonable".

Peter P. Swire was much more skeptical about section 214 and 215 than McCarthy. He explains that FISA originally did not apply to business records and was only designed for surveillance, and after the Oklahoma and World Trade Center bombings it was amended to apply to travel documents only. It was section 215 that made broad changes to allow access to business records. He also explains that the legal standing changed in such a way that a FISA order to access business records to could apply to anyone, and if necessary the government could ask for access to whole databases. He argues that "FISA orders can now apply to anyone, not only the target of the investigation" and that it is no longer necessary for FISA orders to be targeted against a foreign power or agents of a foreign power, but can now be used to gain records of those who have nothing to do with a foreign power. He says that there are only weak constraints to base the order on an authorised investigation and that surveillance must not be based entirely on First Amendment activities.

Swire pointed out that business records obtained under FISA are different from those obtained under similar criminal legislation, in that gag orders may not be applied to criminal investigations. He also argues that the US DOJ's assertion that they can gain access to documents held by a third party because these documents are not protected by the Fourth Amendment is flawed because "it mistakenly asserts that something that is constitutional is also desirable policy". He points out that "to see this mistake, consider that a 90 percent income tax is almost certainly constitutional, but few people think it therefore would be a wise policy" . In this light he argues that a better policy for sensitive library documents is to have significant oversight from the courts.

In response to McCarthy's comment that "one must address the theater over library records, risibly evoking visions of DOJ Thought Police monitoring, and thus chilling, the reading preferences of Americans", Swire counters that "the debate about access to library records has been important as a symbol of possible over-reaching in government surveillance, much as the Patriot Act itself has become a symbol of that concern". He points out that FISA was a response to the abuses of the Nixon government after the Watergate scandal and "revelations about systematic surveillance of journalists and of political opponents of the government" and that "standard First Amendment jurisprudence recognizes the chilling effect on expression and political activity that can result from such surveillance." He highlights Attorney General Ashcroft's statements in 2003 that section 215 had not been used to gain access to library records shows that the broad new provisions of section 215 are not necessary and that this section needs to sunset. However, failing this, he believes that different types of records could be handled differently, with library records carved out of the Act, and that "there could be deference to the medical, financial, and other privacy laws on the books".

Swire also objected to the gag order provision of section 215, reasoning that a gag order is necessary for wiretaps as without secrecy the effectiveness is greatly diminished, while a record search is not diminished if secrecy is kept. He believes that the ability to speak to the press is an important First Amendment right which the gag rule takes away. He believes that the new, broader search powers of FISA combined with an inability to tell others that the order is being carried out removes an effective check against abuse of power: publicity. Swire recommends that the gag order be removed, but failing this it should be time limited and eventually revealed, and perhaps make the fact of a search announceable, but disallow the naming of the suspect.

On section 214, he simply states that "In 2000, the House Judiciary Committee voted overwhelmingly to raise the standard for a pen register order from "any authorized investigation" to "specific and articulable facts." The issue for both criminal and FISA pen register orders is whether the Committee got it right at that time – whether the standard for such orders is simply too low."

In response, McCarthy gave three reasons why he believes Swires was wrong. He believes that Swires gave "short shrift to the national security threat", and as national security is the highest public interest he believes that "it makes no sense to give individual interests primacy over the public's need to have foreign enemies thoroughly checked", something he believes overrules concerns about the gag rule of section 215 as he believes that "a public safety threat, however, requires reasonable balance between the public interest in disclosure and the reality that disclosure makes our enemies, to be blunt, more efficient at killing us". He does not believe that prosecution is an adequate measure as he believes that terrorist organisations should be stopped before they strike, not after. Secondly, McCarthy argues that government officials should not be hampered in their jobs, because "when government's hands are tied out of a hyper-fear of corrupt behavior, the only hands being tied belong to the honest people — the occasional rogue will be a rogue no matter what the rules are"; he also believes that there is not enough time or resources for Watergate-style abuses, he says "the executive branch knows that history as does the congress [and m]indful of it, they perform and oversee." Finally, McCarthy believes that the proposed changes by Swires would "merely chase investigations into the criminal justice system where none of the oversight mechanisms inherent in Section 215 exist". He ends his argument by stating that:

Assuming arguendo that Justice Department practice could temper this limitless authority, the fact is that terrorist conspiracies (al Qaeda, Hezbollah, etc.) are ongoing. Crimes are being committed, the criminal statutes are tremendously broad, and there simply is no matter remotely touching on terrorism that a grand jury is barred from investigating.

In his final response, Swires summed up the debate as he saw it and ended by stating that "I try in my writings never to be alarmist. That said, the current gag rule is wildly outside of the American tradition and should be amended."

=== Sections 218 ===
Andrew C. McCarthy argued that section 218, which changed FISA from stating that the purpose of foreign surveillance was to gather intelligence information to be the significant purpose of intelligence information gathering, should be kept even though it is already clear that this is what is meant under FISA in any case. He explains that FISA was misinterpreted to have "primary purpose" tests for surveillance for nearly a quarter-century, and that in April 2002 the Foreign Intelligence Surveillance Court of Review found that,

it is quite puzzling that the Justice Department, at some point during the 1980s, began to read the statute as limiting the Department's ability to obtain FISA orders if it intended to prosecute the targeted agents–even for foreign intelligence crimes... the definition of foreign intelligence information includes evidence of crimes such as espionage, sabotage or terrorism. Indeed, it is virtually impossible to read the 1978 FISA to exclude from its purpose the prosecution of foreign intelligence crimes, most importantly because, as we have noted, the definition of an agent of a foreign power–if he or she is a U.S. person–is grounded on criminal conduct.

Similarly, McCarthy argues that the separation of foreign intelligence and criminal investigation is a false dichotomy, in that "the existence of a crime or national security threat is an objective reality, entirely independent of the investigators' subjective mindsets about why they are investigating". He believes that it is wrong "to suspect systematically dishonest resort to FISA [, as] FISA applications require a specialized and rigorous internal approval process before presentation to the court. Assuming arguendo an agent willing to act corruptly, it would be far easier and less detectable to fabricate the evidence necessary to get an ordinary criminal wiretap than to fabricate a national security reason to use FISA". McCarthy believes that over time, the U.S. Justice Department misinterpreted FISA to believe that criminal investigations could not be undertaken under FISA, but "began construing the certification not as a mere announcement of purpose but as something more restrictive: a substantive limitation on the use of FISA evidence in criminal cases". McCarthy then explains that the Foreign Intelligence Surveillance Court of Review found that ""clearly did not preclude or limit the government's use ... of foreign intelligence information, which included evidence of certain kinds of criminal activity, in a criminal prosecution." McCarthy then notes the practical consequences of the U.S. DoJ's misinterpretation of FISA:

The best known pernicious consequence of all this occurred in August 2001. Relying on the wall, FBI headquarters declined to allow criminal investigators to assist an intelligence investigation seeking to locate probable terrorists Khalid al-Midhar and Nawaf al-Hazmi. A few weeks later, on 9/11, the pair helped hijack Flight 77 and pilot it into the Pentagon.

In light of these matters, McCarthy believes that although section 218 is not legally necessary it should remain anyway, to clarify clearly what the Act says and remove any misunderstanding as to what is meant in FISA, and he believes that the section should not sunset.

David D. Cole argued that the changes to the law were unnecessary, and accused the proponents of the USA PATRIOT Act of "[being] equally guilty of propagating competing myths in this debate, nowhere more so than with respect to Section 218 and the "wall." He agrees that the wall was not required by FISA, and maintains that section 218 was not sufficient to reduce barriers between information sharing amongst agencies — this, he says, was and remains a bureaucratic issue and not a statutory one. He blames the CIA not trusting the FBI, and believes that pre-Patriot Act FISA was not the cause of problems of communications between the two agencies. Cole's argument is that the primary purpose test applied to acquiring foreign intelligence information when undertaking surveillance was "simply sought to reduce the risk that FISA, which permits searches on less than criminal probable cause, would become an end run around the constitutional requirement of criminal probable cause for searches conducted for criminal law purposes" and that although a secondary criminal purpose may later arise, the agency firstly must primarily gain the order to gain foreign intelligence information. He also dismissed the claims that before section 218 was enacted possible terrorist prosecution was not possible, citing the prosecution of Sami Al-Arian by the U.S. DOJ, which used FISA wiretaps undertaken before the Patriot Act was enacted, which fell under the pre-Patriot FISA law. He also attacks suggestions that when an investigation turned from foreign intelligence to a primarily criminal investigation then a wiretap would need to be taken down, instead positing that once it became criminal "government agents would simply have to satisfy the standards applicable to criminal investigations – namely, by showing that they had probable cause that the tap would reveal evidence of criminal conduct... [and t]he tap or the search would then continue".

Cole believes that the FISA is based on an untested (by the U.S. Supreme Court) assumption that FISA searches can be performed under a lower showing of suspicion than would be mandated for criminal searches. He believes that the term "foreign power" is broad enough to "[encompass] any political organization comprised of a majority of noncitizens", and though they must show reasonable evidence of a crime when targeting a U.S. citizen, the agency must only show evidence that a foreign person is an agent of a foreign power. He states that FISA was based on an "administrative search" exception to the Fourth Amendment, which relaxed the probable cause requirement for searches "where the search serves some special need beyond criminal law enforcement". However, Cole believes that the administrative search exception does not apply to criminal law enforcement, therefore when an investigation turns into a primarily criminal investigation the traditional standards of criminal probable cause would then apply. The crux of Cole's argument is that,

[b]y abandoning that distinction and allowing searches on less than probable cause where the government is primarily seeking criminal prosecution, Section 218 raises a serious constitutional question. Thus, Section 218 was not only unnecessary to bring down the wall, but may render FISA unconstitutional.

Cole believes that section 218 makes it more likely "that information obtained through FISA wiretaps and searches will be used against defendants in criminal cases", and suggests that criminal defendants or their cleared counsel should be able to review "the initial application for the FISA wiretap or search when contesting the admissibility of evidence obtained through a FISA search" using "[a]n amendment requiring disclosure of FISA applications where evidence is sought to be used in a criminal trial would encourage adherence to the law by putting federal officials on notice that at some point the legality of the FISA warrant would be subjected to adversarial testing". Confidentiality could be kept by limiting access to the information to cleared council or by applying the restrictions of the Classified Information Procedures Act.

McCarthy totally disagreed with everything Cole said, stating that "It is apt that Professor David Cole begins the title of his response 'Imaginary Walls[.]' His submission is largely imaginary, creating rather than relating 'myths' about the structural impediments to good intelligence that plagued the pre-9/11 world." He believes that Cole's whole argument is pinned to the belief that FISA in unconstitutional, something McCarthy totally disagreed with. In McCarthy's mind, Cole's objection to FISA is that he believes, incorrectly, that under the Fourth Amendment searches are "inappropriate absent probable cause of a crime". He argues that Cole is wrong when he states that FISA requires a lower standard of suspicion to authorise searches, but rather it requires a different standard than is required of criminal searches. McCarthy says Cole's "suggestion that a 'foreign power' under FISA could be any 'political organization' comprised predominantly of non-citizens is overwrought", and that only those organisations proven to be engaged in clandestine operations will be targeted. He also says that Cole is wrong in that under FISA government searches and surveillance were never restricted to searches whose primary purpose was intelligence gathering, and therefore section 218 is not constitutionally suspect. McCarthy says that though the enforcing of a wall between criminal and foreign investigations under FISA was a misunderstanding by the U.S. DOJ, the reality was that the misunderstanding of the Act did not mean that structural restrictions were not established. He ends by stating that "[n]o one claims the wall tainted the propriety of intelligence gathering. It blocked sharing of the intelligence gathered. That is the bureaucratic monstrosity dismantled by Section 218... Without that clarification of law, the disastrous primary purpose doctrine would be undisturbed, the unnecessary wall would still be in place, dots would remain unconnected, prosecutions like al-Arian would not have occurred, and the United States would be at considerably greater risk."

In his final response, Cole defended himself, stating that his argument about the constitutionality of section 218 was because it "deprives FISA of its constitutional justification" — previously, he says, FISA searches were justified without reasonable cause justifications because they fell under an "administrative search" exception in the constitution. However, Cole says that the Supreme Court has held that this "does not apply where the government's purpose is criminal law enforcement". Now that the Patriot Act makes foreign intelligence gathering the significant and not sole reason for FISA searches, allowing for criminal searches under FISA, Cole believes that such searches would then by on constitutionally shaky ground. Cole argues that McCarthy's argument is based on a false premise: that section 218 is constitutional because, in McCarthy's words, "[it] mandat[es] that intelligence gathering be "a primary purpose", [and] constrains the government in a way that neither the Fourth Amendment nor FISA does". Cole disputes this, and says that "the very purpose of Section 218 was to eliminate the 'primary purpose' requirement". Cole also believes that McCarthy is wrong when he asserts that FISA targets only those "foreign powers" engaged in intelligence gathering, sabotage or international terrorism (McCarthy cited 50 U.S.C. § 1801(b)(2)(A), (C)). Cole cites 50 U.S.C. § 1801(a)(5), where FISA defines a "foreign power" as "a foreign-based political organization, not substantially composed of United States persons." and defines an "agent" of a foreign power to be those who are "an officer or employee of a foreign power." This, he says, is too broad, giving the example where a "British citizen working here as an employee of Amnesty International is an 'agent of a foreign power.'". Cole finally points out that McCarthy does not address his suggestion that "[FISA] should be amended to permit defendants in those prosecutions access to the FISA applications to challenge the warrant's validity".
