= Section summary of Title II of the Patriot Act =

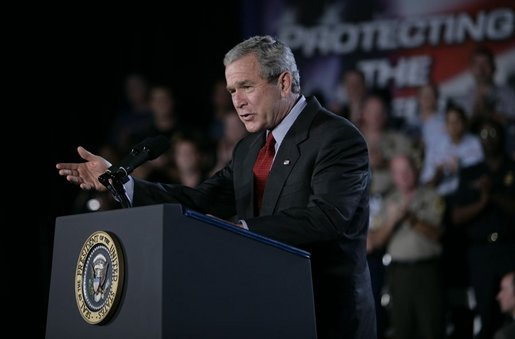
President George W. Bush gestures as he addresses an audience Wednesday, July 20, 2005 at the Port of Baltimore in Baltimore, Md., encouraging the renewal of provisions of the Patriot Act.

The following is a section summary of the USA PATRIOT Act, Title II. The USA PATRIOT Act was passed by the United States Congress in 2001 as a response to the September 11, 2001 attacks. Title II: Enhanced Surveillance Procedures gave increased powers of surveillance to various government agencies and bodies. This title has 25 sections, with one of the sections (section 224) containing a sunset clause which sets an expiration date, of 31 December 2005, for most of the title's provisions. On 22 December 2005, the sunset clause expiration date was extended to 3 February 2006.

Title II contains many of the most contentious provisions of the act. Supporters of the Patriot Act claim that these provisions are necessary in fighting the war on terrorism, while its detractors argue that many of the sections of Title II infringe upon individual and civil rights.

The sections of Title II amend the Foreign Intelligence Surveillance Act of 1978 and its provisions in 18 U.S.C., dealing with "Crimes and Criminal Procedure". It also amends the Electronic Communications Privacy Act of 1986. In general, the Title expands federal agencies' powers in intercepting, sharing, and using private telecommunications, especially electronic communications, along with a focus on criminal investigations by updating the rules that govern computer crime investigations. It also sets out procedures and limitations for individuals who feel their rights have been violated to seek redress, including against the United States government. However, it also includes a section that deals with trade sanctions against countries whose government supports terrorism, which is not directly related to surveillance issues.

== Sections 201 & 202: Intercepting communications ==
Two sections deal with the interception of communications by the United States government.

Section 201 is titled Authority to intercept wire, oral, and electronic communications relating to terrorism. This section amended 18 U.S.C. § 2516 (Authorization for interception of wire, oral, or electronic communications) of the United States Code. This section allows (under certain specific conditions) the United States Attorney General (or some of his subordinates) to authorize a Federal judge to make an order authorizing or approving the interception of wire or oral communications by the Federal Bureau of Investigation (FBI), or another relevant U.S. Federal agency.

The Attorney General's subordinates who can use Section 201 are: the Deputy Attorney General, the Associate Attorney General, any Assistant Attorney General, any acting Assistant Attorney General, any Deputy Assistant Attorney General or acting Deputy Assistant Attorney General in the Criminal Division who is specially designated by the Attorney General.

The amendment added a further condition which allowed an interception order to be carried out. The interception order may now be made if a criminal violation is made with respect to terrorism (defined by 18 U.S.C. § 2332):

- the use of weapons of mass destruction (defined by 18 U.S.C. § 2332a), or
- providing financial aid to facilitate acts of terrorism (defined by 18 U.S.C. § 2332d), or
- providing material support to terrorists (defined by 18 U.S.C. § 2339A), or
- Providing material support or resources to designated foreign terrorist groups (defined by 18 U.S.C. § 2339B).

Note: the legislation states that title 18, section 2516(1), paragraph (p) of the United States Code was redesignated (moved) to become paragraph (q). This paragraph had been previously redesignated by two other pieces of legislation: the Antiterrorism and Effective Death Penalty Act of 1996 and by the Illegal Immigration Reform and Immigrant Responsibility Act of 1996 (see section 201(3)).

Section 202 is titled Authority to intercept wire, oral, and electronic communications relating to computer fraud and abuse offenses, and amended the United States Code to include computer fraud and abuse in the list of reasons why an interception order may be granted.

== Section 203: Authority to share criminal investigative information ==
Section 203 (Authority to share criminal investigation information) modified the Federal Rules of Criminal Procedure with respect to disclosure of information before the grand jury (Rule 6(e)). Section 203(a) allowed the disclosure of matters in deliberation by the grand jury, which are normally otherwise prohibited, if:

- a court orders it (before or during a judicial proceeding),
- a court finds that there are grounds for a motion to dismiss an indictment because of matters before the Grand Jury,
- if the matters in deliberation are made by an attorney for the government to another Federal grand jury,
- an attorney for the government requests that matters before the grand jury may reveal a violation of State criminal law,
- the matters involve foreign intelligence or counterintelligence or foreign intelligence information. Foreign intelligence and counterintelligence was defined in section 3 of the National Security Act of 1947, and "foreign intelligence information" was further defined in the amendment as information about:
  1. an actual or potential attack or other grave hostile acts of a foreign power or an agent of a foreign power;
  2. sabotage or international terrorism by a foreign power or an agent of a foreign power; or
  3. clandestine intelligence activities by an intelligence service or network of a foreign power or by an agent of foreign power; or
  4. information about a foreign power or foreign territory that relates to the national defense or the security of the United States or the conduct of the foreign affairs of the United States.'.
  5. information about non-U.S. and U.S. citizens

203(a) gave the court the power to order a time within which information may be disclosed, and specified when a government agency may use information disclosed about a foreign power. The rules of criminal procedure now state that "within a reasonable time after such disclosure, an attorney for the government shall file under seal a notice with the court stating the fact that such information was disclosed and the departments, agencies, or entities to which the disclosure was made."

Section 203(b) modified 18 U.S.C. § 2517, which details who is allowed to learn the results of a communications interception, to allow any investigative or law enforcement officer, or attorney for the Government to divulge foreign intelligence, counterintelligence or foreign intelligence information to a variety of Federal officials. Specifically, any official who has obtained knowledge of the contents of any wire, oral, or electronic communication, or evidence derived from this could divulge this information to any Federal law enforcement, intelligence, protective, immigration, national defense, or national security official. The definition of "foreign intelligence" was the same as section 203(a), with the same ability to define "foreign intelligence" to be intelligence of a non-U.S. and U.S. citizen. The information received must only be used as necessary in the conduct of the official's official duties.

The definition of "foreign intelligence information" is defined again in Section 203(d).

Section 203(c) specified that the Attorney General must establish procedures for the disclosure of information due to 18 U.S.C. § 2517 (see above), for those people who are defined as U.S. citizens.

== Section 204: Limitations on communication interceptions ==
Section 204 (Clarification of intelligence exceptions from limitations on interception and disclosure of wire, oral, and electronic communication) removed restrictions from the acquisition of foreign intelligence information from international or foreign communications. It was also clarified that the Foreign Intelligence Surveillance Act of 1978 should not only be the sole means of electronic surveillance for just oral and wire intercepts, but should also include electronic communication.

== Section 205: Employment of translators by the FBI ==
Under section 205 (Employment of translators by the Federal Bureau of Investigation), the Director of the Federal Bureau of Investigation is now allowed to employ translators to support counterterrorism investigations and operations without regard to applicable Federal personnel requirements and limitations. However, he must report to the House Judiciary Committee and Senate Judiciary Committee the number of translators employed and any legal reasons why he cannot employ translators from federal, state, or local agencies.

== Section 206: Roving surveillance authority ==
The Foreign Intelligence Surveillance Act of 1978 allows an applicant access to all information, facilities, or technical assistance necessary to perform electronic surveillance on a particular target. The assistance given must protect the secrecy of and cause as little disruption to the ongoing surveillance effort as possible. The direction could be made at the request of the applicant of the surveillance order, by a common carrier, landlord, custodian or other specified person. Section 206 (Roving surveillance authority under the Foreign Intelligence Surveillance Act of 1978) amended this to add:

or in circumstances where the Court finds that the actions of the target of the application may have the effect of thwarting the identification of a particular person.

This allows intelligence agencies to undertake "roving" surveillance: they do not have to specify the exact facility or location where their surveillance will be done. Roving surveillance was already specified for criminal investigations under 18 U.S.C. § 2518(11), and section 206 brought the ability of intelligence agencies to undertake such roving surveillance into line with such criminal investigations. However, the section was not without controversy, as James X. Dempsey, the Executive Director of the Center for Democracy & Technology, argued that a few months after the Patriot Act was passed the Intelligence Authorization Act was also passed that had the unintended effect of seeming to authorize "John Doe" roving taps — FISA orders that identify neither the target nor the location of the interception (see The Patriot Debates, James X. Dempsey debates Paul Rosenzweig on section 206).

== Section 207: Duration of FISA surveillance on agents of a foreign power ==
Previously FISA only defined the duration of a surveillance order against a foreign power (defined in 50 U.S.C. § 1805(e)(1)) . This was amended by section 207 (Duration of FISA surveillance of non-United States persons who are agents of a foreign power) to allow surveillance of agents of a foreign power (as defined in section 50 U.S.C. § 1801(b)(1)(A)) for a maximum of 90 days. Section 304(d)(1) was also amended to extend orders for physical searches from 45 days to 90 days, and orders for physical searches against agents of a foreign power are allowed for a maximum of 120 days. The act also clarified that extensions for surveillance could be granted for a maximum of a year against agents of a foreign power.

== Section 208: Designation of judges ==
Section 103(A) of FISA was amended by Section 208 (Designation of judges) of the Patriot Act to increase the number of federal district court judges who must now review surveillance orders from seven to 11. Of these, three of the judges must live within 20 miles (32 km) of the District of Columbia.

== Section 209: Seizure of voice-mail messages pursuant to warrants ==
Section 209 (Seizure of voice-mail messages pursuant to warrants) removed the text "any electronic storage of such communication" from title 18, section 2510 of the United States Code. Before this was struck from the Code, the U.S. government needed to apply for a title III wiretap order before they could open voice-mails; however, now the government only need apply for an ordinary search. Section 2703, which specifies when a "provider of electronic communication services" must disclose the contents of stored communications, was also amended to allow such a provider to be compelled to disclose the contents via a search warrant, and not a wiretap order. According to Vermont senator Patrick Leahy, this was done to "harmonizing the rules applicable to stored voice and non-voice (e.g., e-mail) communications".

== Section 210 & 211: Scope of subpoenas for records of electronic communications ==
The U.S. Code specifies when the U.S. government may require a provider of an electronic communication service to hand over communication records. It specifies what that provider must disclose to the government, and was amended by section 210 (Scope of subpoenas for records of electronic communications) to include records of session times and durations of electronic communication as well as any identifying numbers or addresses of the equipment that was being used, even if this may only be temporary. For instance, this would include temporarily assigned IP addresses, such as those established by DHCP.

Section 211 (Clarification of scope) further clarified the scope of such orders. 47 U.S.C. § 551 (Section 631 of the Communications Act of 1934) deals with the privacy granted to users of cable TV. The code was amended to allow the government to have access to the records of cable customers, with the notable exclusion of records revealing cable subscriber selection of video programming from a cable operator.

== Section 212: Emergency disclosure of electronic communications ==
Section 212 (Emergency disclosure of electronic communications to protect life and limb) amended the US Code to stop a communications provider from providing communication records (not necessarily relating to the content itself) about a customer's communications to others. However, should the provider reasonably believe that an emergency involving immediate danger of death or serious physical injury to any person then the communications provider can now disclose this information. The act did not make clear what "reasonably" meant.

A communications provider could also disclose communications records if:

- a court orders the disclosure of communications at the request of a government agency (18 U.S.C. § 2703)
- the customer allows the information to be disclosed
- if the service provider believes that they must do so to protect their rights or property.

This section was repealed by the Homeland Security Act of 2002 — this act also created the Homeland Security Department — and was replaced with a new and permanent emergency disclosure provision.

== Section 213: Delayed search warrant notification ==
Section 213 (Authority for delaying notice of the execution of a warrant) amended the US Code to allow the notification of search warrants to be delayed. This section has been commonly referred to as the "sneak and peek" section, a phrase originating from the FBI and not, as commonly believed, from opponents of the Patriot Act. The U.S. government may now legally search and seize property that constitutes evidence of a United States criminal offense without immediately telling the owner. The court may only order the delayed notification if they have reason to believe it would hurt an investigation — delayed notifications were already defined in 18 U.S.C. § 2705 — or, if a search warrant specified that the subject of the warrant must be notified "within a reasonable period of its execution," then it allows the court to extend the period before the notification is given, though the government must show "good cause". If the search warrant prohibited the seizure of property or communications, then the search warrant could then be delayed.

Before the Patriot Act was enacted, there were three cases before the United States district courts: United States v. Freitas, 800 F.2d 1451 (9th Cir. 1986); United States v. Villegas, 899 F.2d 1324 (2d Cir. 1990); and United States v. Simons, 206 F.3d 392 (4th Cir. 2000). Each determined that, under certain circumstances, it was not unconstitutional to delay the notification of search warrants.

== Section 214: Pen register and trap and trace authority ==
FISA was amended by section 214 (Pen register and trap and trace authority under FISA) to clarify that pen register and trap and trace surveillance can be authorised to allow government agencies to gather foreign intelligence information. Where the law only allowed them to gather surveillance if there was evidence of international terrorism, it now gives the courts the power to grant trap and traces against:

- non-U.S. citizens.
- those suspected of being involved with international terrorism,
- those undertaking clandestine intelligence activities

Any investigation against U.S. citizens must not violate the First Amendment to the United States Constitution.

== Section 215: Access to records and other items under FISA ==
=== Nickname and connection to libraries ===
This section is commonly referred to as the "library records provision" or the “library provision”. The text does not explicitly mention libraries. It focuses on “tangible things (including books, records, papers, documents, and other items)”.

Within a week of 9/11, the FBI subpoenaed the suspects’ library records in South Florida. In early October, a precursor to the Patriot Act was passed, with a proposed amendment specifically attempting to limit access to library records being killed. The American Library Association spoke out against Section 215 prior to its being passed.

The phrase “library provision” appeared in print about a month after the bill passed, and “library records provision” appeared the following summer, both with a connection to actual libraries, though a 2011 LA Times article alternately claims that Section 215 is “often called the ‘library provision’ because of the wide range of personal material that can be investigated.”

In 2003, John Ashcroft announced that the FBI had yet to use its Patriot Act authority to investigate library records, a claim restated in March 2005. in July 2005, a librarian received a records request with a gag order, though the Washington Post notes that “Such letters existed before the Patriot Act and did not derive from Section 215. But their use was expanded by the law."

=== Contents, controversy, and expiration ===
FISA was modified by section 215 (Access to records and other items under the Foreign Intelligence Surveillance Act) of the Act to allow the Director of the FBI (or an official designated by the Director, so long as that official's rank is no lower than Assistant Special Agent in Charge) to apply for an order to produce materials that assist in an investigation undertaken to protect against international terrorism or clandestine intelligence activities. The Act gives an example to clarify what it means by "tangible things": it includes "books, records, papers, documents, and other items".

It is specified that any such investigation must be conducted in accordance with guidelines laid out in Executive Order 12333 (which pertains to United States intelligence activities). Investigations must also not be performed on U.S. citizens who are carrying out activities protected by the First Amendment to the Constitution of the United States.

Any order that is granted must be given by a FISA court judge or by a magistrate judge who is publicly designated by the Chief Justice of the United States to allow such an order to be given. Any application must prove that it is being conducted without violating the First Amendment rights of any U.S. citizens. The application can only be used to obtain foreign intelligence information not concerning a U.S. citizen or to protect against international terrorism or clandestine intelligence activities.

This section of the USA PATRIOT Act is controversial because the order may be granted ex parte, and once it is granted—in order to avoid jeopardizing the investigation—the order may not disclose the reasons behind why the order was granted.

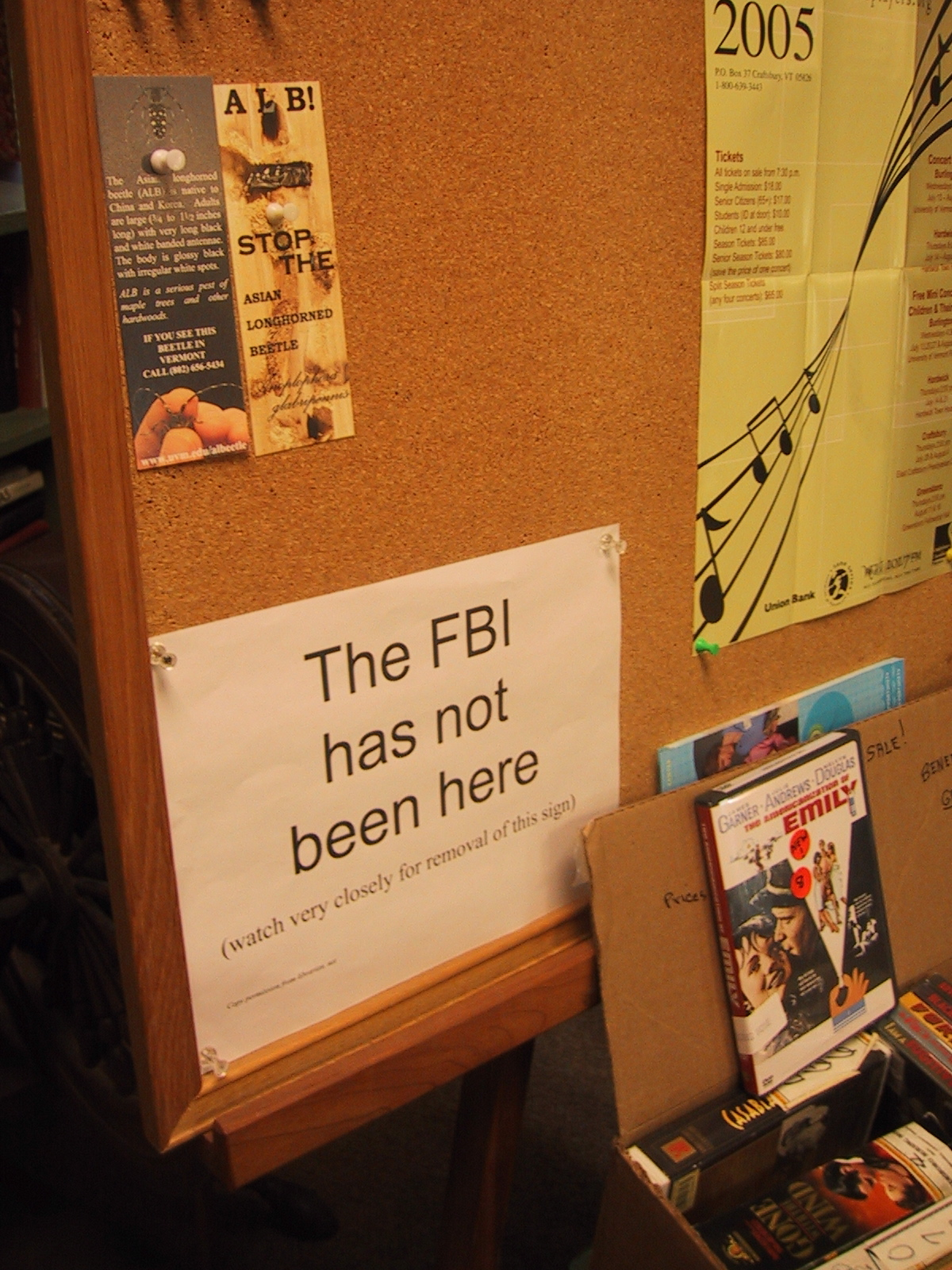
A "warrant canary" on display at a public library in Vermont in 2005.

The section carries a gag order stating that "No person shall disclose to any other person (other than those persons necessary to produce the tangible things under this section) that the Federal Bureau of Investigation has sought or obtained tangible things under this section". Senator Rand Paul stated that the non-disclosure is imposed for one year, though this is not explicitly mentioned in the section.

In order to protect anyone who complies with the order, FISA now prevents any person who complies with the order in "good faith" from being liable for producing any tangible goods required by the court order. The production of tangible items is not deemed to constitute a waiver of any privilege in any other proceeding or context.

As a safeguard, section 502 of FISA compels the Attorney General to inform the Permanent Select Committee on Intelligence of the House of Representatives and the Select Committee on Intelligence of the Senate of all such orders granted. In a semi-annual basis, the Attorney General must also provide a report to the Committee on the Judiciary of the House of Representatives and the Senate which details the total number of applications over the previous 6 months made for orders approving requests for the production of tangible things and the total number of such orders either granted, modified, or denied.

This section was reauthorized in 2011 for four years.

During a House Judiciary hearing on domestic spying on July 17, 2013 John C. Inglis, the deputy director of the surveillance agency, told a member of the House judiciary committee that NSA analysts can perform "a second or third hop query" through its collections of telephone data and internet records in order to find connections to terrorist organizations. "Hops" refers to a technical term indicating connections between people. A three-hop query means that the NSA can look at data not only from a suspected terrorist, but from everyone that suspect communicated with, and then from everyone those people communicated with, and then from everyone all of those people communicated with. NSA officials had said previously that data mining was limited to two hops, but Inglis suggested that the Foreign Intelligence Surveillance Court has allowed for data analysis extending "two or three hops".

However, in 2015, the Second Circuit appeals court ruled in ACLU v. Clapper that Section 215 of the Patriot Act did not authorize the bulk collection of phone metadata, which judge Gerard E. Lynch called a "staggering" amount of information.

On May 20, 2015, Paul spoke for ten and a half hours in opposition to the reauthorization of Section 215 of the Patriot Act.

At midnight on May 31, 2015, Section 215 expired. With the passage of the USA Freedom Act on June 2, 2015 the expired parts of law, including Section 215, were reported broadly as restored and renewed through 2019. But, the USA Freedom Act did not explicitly state that it was restoring the expired provisions of Section 215. Since such renewal language is nowhere to be found, the law amended the version of the Foreign Intelligence Surveillance Act that existed on October 25, 2001, prior to changes brought by the USA Patriot Act, rendering much of the amendment language incoherent. How this legislative issue will be fixed is not clear. The attempted amendments to Section 215 were intended to stop the NSA from continuing its mass phone data collection program. Instead, phone companies will retain the data and the NSA can obtain information about targeted individuals with permission from a federal court.

== Section 216: Authority to issue pen registers and trap and trace devices ==
Section 216 (Modification of authorities relating to use of pen registers and trap and trace devices) deals with three specific areas with regards to pen registers and trap and trace devices: general limitations to the use of such devices, how an order allowing the use of such devices must be made, and the definition of such devices.

=== Limitations ===
18 U.S.C. § 3121 details the exceptions related to the general prohibition on pen register and trap and trace devices. Along with gathering information for dialup communications, it allows for gathering routing and other addressing information. It is specifically limited to this information: the Act does not allow such surveillance to capture the actual information that is contained in the communication being monitored. However, organisations such as the EFF have pointed out that certain types of information that can be captured, such as URLs, can have content embedded in them. They object to the application of trap and trace and pen register devices to newer technology using a standard designed for telephones.

=== Making and carrying out orders ===
It also details that an order may be applied for ex parte (without the party it is made against present, which in itself is not unusual for search warrants), and allows the agency who applied for the order to compel any relevant person or entity providing wire or electronic communication service to assist with the surveillance. If the party whom the order is made against so requests, the attorney for the Government, law enforcement or investigative officer that is serving the order must provide written or electronic certification that the order applies to the targeted individual.

If a pen register or trap and trace device is used on a packet-switched data network, then the agency doing surveillance must keep a detailed log containing:

1. any officer or officers who installed the device and any officer or officers who accessed the device to obtain information from the network;
2. the date and time the device was installed, the date and time the device was uninstalled, and the date, time, and duration of each time the device is accessed to obtain information;
3. the configuration of the device at the time of its installation and any subsequent modification made to the device; and
4. any information which has been collected by the device

This information must be generated for the entire time the device is active, and must be provided ex parte and under seal to the court which entered the ex parte order authorizing the installation and use of the device. This must be done within 30 days after termination of the order.

Orders must now include the following information:

- the identifying number of the device under surveillance
- the location of the telephone line or other facility to which the pen register or trap and trace device is to be attached or applied
- if a trap and trace device is installed, the geographic limits of the order must be specified

This section amended the non-disclosure requirements of 18 U.S.C. § 3123(d)(2) by expanding to include those whose facilities are used to establish the trap and trace or pen register or to those people who assist with applying the surveillance order who must not disclose that surveillance is being undertaken. Before this it had only applied to the person owning or leasing the line.

=== Definitions ===
The following terms were redefined in the US Code's chapter 206 (which solely deals with pen registers and trap and trace devices):

- Court of competent jurisdiction: defined in 18 U.S.C. § 3127(2), subparagraph A was stricken and replaced to redefine the court to be any United States district court (including a magistrate judge of such a court) or any United States court of appeals having jurisdiction over the offense being investigated (title 18 also allows State courts that have been given authority by their State to use pen register and trap and trace devices)
- Pen register: defined in 18 U.S.C. § 3127(3), the definition of such a device was expanded to include a device that captures dialing, routing, addressing, or signaling information from an electronics communication device. It limited the usage of such devices to exclude the capturing of any of the contents of communications being monitored. 18 U.S.C. § 3124(b) was also similarly amended.
- Trap and trace device: defined in 18 U.S.C. § 3127(4), the definition was similarly expanded to include the dialing, routing, addressing, or signaling information from an electronics communication device. However, a trap and trace device can now also be a "process", not just a device.
- Contents: 18 U.S.C. § 3127(1) clarifies the term "contents" (as referred to in the definition of trap and trace devices and pen registers) to conform to the definition as defined in 18 U.S.C. § 2510(8), which when used with respect to any wire, oral, or electronic communication, includes any information concerning the substance, purport, or meaning of that communication.

== Section 217: Interception of computer trespasser communications ==
Section 217 (Interception of computer trespasser communications) firstly defines the following terms:

- Protected computer: this is defined in 18 U.S.C. § 1030(e)(2)(A), and is any computer that is used by a financial institution or the United States Government or one which is used in interstate or foreign commerce or communication, including a computer located outside the United States that is used in a manner that affects interstate or foreign commerce or communication of the United States.
- Computer trespasser: this is defined in 18 U.S.C. § 2510(21) and references to this phrase means
  1. a person who accesses a protected computer without authorization and thus has no reasonable expectation of privacy in any communication transmitted to, through, or from the protected computer; and
  2. does not include a person known by the owner or operator of the protected computer to have an existing contractual relationship with the owner or operator of the protected computer for access to all or part of the protected computer

Amendments were made to 18 U.S.C. § 2511(2) to make it lawful to allow a person to intercept the communications of a computer trespasser if

1. the owner or operator of the protected computer authorizes the interception of the computer trespasser's communications on the protected computer,
2. the person is lawfully engaged in an investigation,
3. the person has reasonable grounds to believe that the contents of the computer trespasser's communications will be relevant to their investigation, and
4. any communication captured can only relate to those transmitted to or from the computer trespasser.

== Section 218: Foreign intelligence information ==
Section 218 (Foreign intelligence information) amended 50 U.S.C. § 1804(a)(6)(B) and 50 U.S.C. § 1823(a)(6)(B) (both FISA sections 104(a) (7)(B) and section 303(a)(7)(B), respectively) to change "the purpose" of surveillance orders under FISA to gain access to foreign intelligence to "significant purpose". Mary DeRosa, in The Patriot Debates, explained that the reason behind this was to remove a legal "wall" which arose when criminal and foreign intelligence overlapped. This was because the U.S. Department of Justice interpreted "the purpose" of surveillance was restricted to collecting information for foreign intelligence, which DeRosa says "was designed to ensure that prosecutors and criminal investigators did not use FISA to circumvent the more rigorous warrant requirements for criminal cases". However, she also says that it is debatable whether this legal tightening of the definition was even necessary, stating that "the Department of Justice argued to the FISA Court of Review in 2002 that the original FISA standard did not require the restrictions that the Department of Justice imposed over the years, and the court appears to have agreed [which] leaves the precise legal effect of a sunset of section 218 somewhat murky."

== Section 219: Single-jurisdiction search warrants for terrorism ==
Section 219 (Single-jurisdiction search warrants for terrorism) amended the Federal Rules of Criminal Procedure to allow a magistrate judge who is involved in an investigation of domestic terrorism or international terrorism the ability to issue a warrant for a person or property within or outside of their district.

== Section 220: Nationwide service of search warrants for electronic evidence ==
Section 220 (Nationwide service of search warrants for electronic evidence) gives the power to Federal courts to issue nationwide service of search warrants for electronic surveillance. However, only courts with jurisdiction over the offense can order such a warrant. This required amending 18 U.S.C. § 2703 and 18 U.S.C. § 2711.

== Section 221: Trade sanctions ==
Section 221 (Trade sanctions) amended the Trade Sanctions Reform and Export Enhancement Act of 2000. This Act prohibits, except under certain specific circumstances, the President from imposing a unilateral agricultural sanction or unilateral medical sanction against a foreign country or foreign entity. The Act holds various exceptions to this prohibition, and the Patriot Act further amended the exceptions to include holding sanctions against countries that design, develop or produce chemical or biological weapons, missiles, or weapons of mass destruction. It also amended the act to include the Taliban as state sponsors of international terrorism. In amending Title IX, section 906 of the Trade sanctions act, the Taliban was determined by the Secretary of State to have repeatedly provided support for acts of international terrorism and the export of agricultural commodities, medicine, or medical devices is now pursuant to one-year licenses issued and reviewed by the United States Government. However, the export of agricultural commodities, medicine, or medical devices to the Government of Syria or to the Government of North Korea were exempt from such a restriction.

The Patriot Act further states that nothing in the Trade Sanctions Act will limit the application of criminal or civil penalties to those who export agricultural commodities, medicine, or medical devices to:

- foreign entities who commit acts of violence to disrupt the Middle East peace process
- those deemed to be part of a Foreign Terrorist Organization under the Antiterrorism and Effective Death Penalty Act of 1996
- foreign entities or individuals deemed to support terrorist activities
- any entity that is involved in drug trafficking
- any foreign entity or individual who is subject to any restriction for involvement in weapons of mass destruction or missile proliferation.

== Section 222: Assistance to law enforcement agencies ==
Section 222 (Assistance to law enforcement agencies) states that nothing in the Patriot Act shall make a communications provider or other individual provide more technical assistance to a law enforcement agency than what is set out in the Act. It also allows for the reasonable compensation of any expenses incurred while assisting with the establishment of pen registers or trap and trace devices.

== Section 223: Civil liability for certain unauthorized disclosures ==
18 U.S.C. § 2520(a) allows any person who has had their rights violated due to the illegal interception of communications to take civil action against the offending party. Section 223 (Civil liability for certain unauthorized disclosures) excluded the United States from such civil action.

If a court or appropriate department or agency determines that the United States or any of its departments or agencies has violated any provision of chapter 119 of the U.S. Code they may request an internal review from that agency or department. If necessary, an employee may then have administrative action taken against them. If the department or agency do not take action, then they must inform the notify the Inspector General who has jurisdiction over the agency or department, and they must give reasons to them why they did not take action.

A citizen's rights will also be found to have been violated if an investigative, law enforcement officer or governmental entity discloses information beyond that allowed in 18 U.S.C. § 2517(a).

=== U.S. Code Title 18, Section 2712 added ===
A totally new section was appended to Title 18, Chapter 121 of the US Code: Section 2712, "Civil actions against the United States". It allows people to take action against the US Government if they feel that they had their rights violated, as defined in chapter 121, chapter 119, or sections 106(a), 305(a), or 405(a) of FISA. The court may assess damages no less than $US10,000 and litigation costs that are reasonably incurred. Those seeking damages must present them to the relevant department or agency as specified in the procedures of the Federal Tort Claims Act.

Actions taken against the United States must be initiated within two years of when the claimant has had a reasonable chance to discover the violation. All cases are presented before a judge, not a jury. However, the court will order a stay of proceedings if they determine that if during the court case civil discovery will hurt the ability of the government to conduct a related investigation or the prosecution of a related criminal case. If the court orders the stay of proceedings they will extend the time period that a claimant has to take action on a reported violation. However, the government may respond to any action against it by submitting evidence ex parte in order to avoid disclosing any matter that may adversely affect a related investigation or a related criminal case. The plaintiff is then given an opportunity to make a submission to the court, not ex parte, and the court may request further information from either party.

If a person wishes to discover or obtain applications or orders or other materials relating to electronic surveillance or to discover, obtain, or suppress evidence or information obtained or derived from electronic surveillance under FISA, then the Attorney General may file an affidavit under oath that disclosure or an adversary hearing would harm the national security of the United States. In these cases, the court may review in camera and ex parte the material relating to the surveillance to make sure that such surveillance was lawfully authorized and conducted. The court may then disclose part of material relating to the surveillance. However, the court is restricted in they may only do this "where such disclosure is necessary to make an accurate determination of the legality of the surveillance". If it then determined that the use of a pen register or trap and trace device was not lawfully authorized or conducted, the result of such surveillance may be suppressed as evidence. However, should the court determine that such surveillance was lawfully authorised and conducted, they may deny the motion of the aggrieved person.

It is further stated that if a court or appropriate department or agency determines that an officer or employee of the United States willfully or intentionally violated any provision of chapter 121 of the U.S. Code they will request an internal review from that agency or department. If necessary, an employee may then have administrative action taken against them. If the department or agency do not take action, then they must inform the notify the Inspector General who has jurisdiction over the agency or department, and they must give reasons to them why they did not take action. (see for a similar part of the Act)

== Section 224: Sunset ==
Section 224 (Sunset) is a sunset clause. Title II and the amendments made by the title originally would have ceased to have effect on December 31, 2005, with the exception of the below sections. However, on December 22, 2005, the sunset clause expiration date was extended to February 3, 2006, and then on February 2, 2006 it was further extended to March 10:

Title II sections that did not expire on March 10, 2006
Section	Section title
203(a)	Authority to share criminal investigation information : Authority to share Grand Jury information
203(c)	Authority to share criminal investigation information : Procedures
205	Employment of translators by the Federal Bureau of Investigation
208	Designation of judges
210	Scope of subpoenas for records of electronic communications
211	Clarification of scope
213	Authority for delaying notice of the execution of a warrant
216	Modification of authorities relating to use of pen registers and trap and trace devices
219	Single-jurisdiction search warrants for terrorism
221	Trade sanctions
222	Assistance to law enforcement agencies

Further, any particular foreign intelligence investigations that are ongoing will continue to be run under the expired sections.

== Section 225: Immunity for compliance with FISA wiretap ==
Section 225 (Immunity for compliance with FISA wiretap) gives legal immunity to any provider of a wire or electronic communication service, landlord, custodian, or other person that provides any information, facilities, or technical assistance in accordance with a court order or request for emergency assistance. This was added to FISA as section 105 (50 U.S.C. § 1805).
