= Title VIII =

Title 8 may refer to:

- Title 8 of the United States Code
- Title 8 of the Code of Federal Regulations
- Title VIII of the Patriot Act
