= Director of National Intelligence Review Group on Intelligence and Communications Technologies =

Review group

Seal of the Office of the Director of National Intelligence

The Director of National Intelligence Review Group on Intelligence and Communications Technologies was a review group formed by the Director of National Intelligence of the United States in light of the global surveillance disclosures of 2013. In December 2013, the five-member group produced a public report.

== Formation ==
On August 12, 2013, President Barack Obama issued a Presidential Memorandum instructing the Director of National Intelligence, James Clapper, to form a "Review Group on Intelligence and Communications Technologies". Obama instructed that "The Review Group will assess whether, in light of advancements in communications technologies, the United States employs its technical collection capabilities in a manner that optimally protects our national security and advances our foreign policy while appropriately accounting for other policy considerations, such as the risk of unauthorized disclosure and our need to maintain the public trust."

The memorandum called for an interim report within 60 days of establishment and a final report by December 15, 2013.

== Membership ==
The group included former counter-terrorism czar Richard A. Clarke, former Acting Central Intelligence Agency director Michael Morell, University of Chicago Law professor Geoffrey Stone, former administrator of the White House Office of Information and Regulatory Affairs Cass Sunstein and Professor and former Chief Counselor for Privacy in the Office of Management and Budget Peter Swire.

== Report ==
The 300-page report, entitled "Liberty and Security in a Changing World", was released on December 12, 2013. It contained over 40 recommendations. Since the report's publications, a number of its 40 recommendations have been adopted into law with the USA FREEDOM Act in particular addressing 7.

=== Reactions ===
The Electronic Frontier Foundation released a statement criticizing the report, saying "we're disappointed that the recommendations suggest a path to continue untargeted spying. Mass surveillance is still heinous, even if private company servers are holding the data instead of government data centers."

The American Civil Liberties Union (ACLU) released a statement welcoming the report, saying "We welcome this report, which advocates for many of the ACLU's positions, including an end to the government's dragnet collection of telephone metadata and its undermining of encryption standards."
