= Peter Swire =

American academic

Peter P. Swire
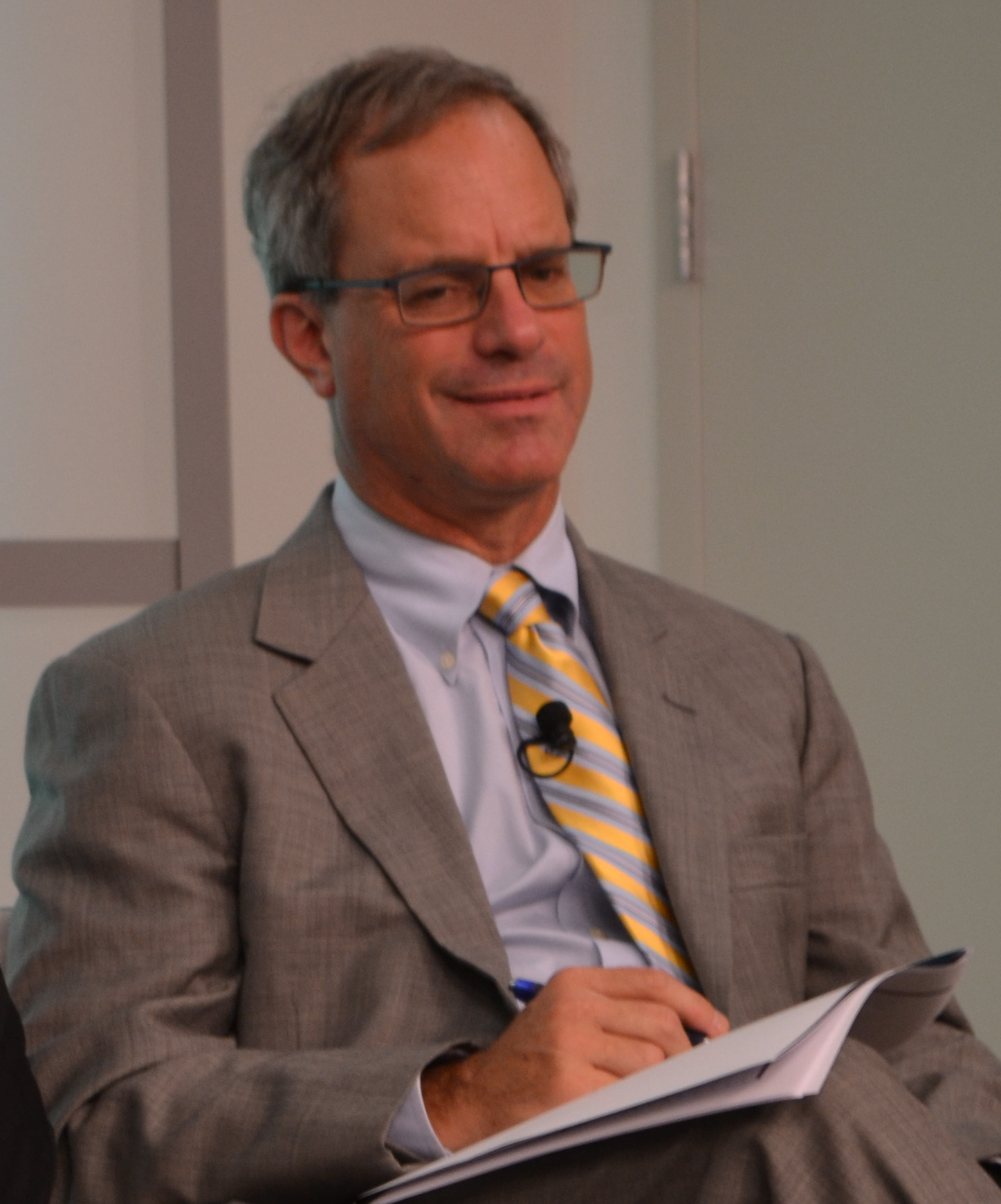
- Peter Swire at 2015 New America event
- Born: May 15, 1958 (age 68)
- Education: Princeton University, Université libre de Bruxelles, Yale Law School
- Occupations: Professor, Scheller College of Business at the Georgia Institute of Technology, Senior Counsel, Alston & Bird
- Spouse: Annie Antón
- Website: www.peterswire.net

Peter P. Swire (born May 15, 1958) is the J.Z. Liang Chair in the School of Cybersecurity and Privacy in the College of Computing at the Georgia Institute of Technology. Swire is also Professor of Law and Ethics in the Scheller College of Business and has an appointment by courtesy with the School of Public Policy. Swire is also a senior fellow at the Future of Privacy Forum.

During the Clinton administration, he became the first person to hold the position of Chief Counselor for Privacy in the Office of Management and Budget. In this role, he coordinated administration policy on privacy and data protection, including interfacing with privacy officials in foreign countries. He may be best known for shaping the Health Insurance Portability and Accountability Act Privacy Rule while serving as the Chief Counselor for Privacy. In November 2012 he was named as co-chair of the Tracking Protection Working Group of the World Wide Web Consortium (W3C), to attempt to mediate a global Do Not Track standard. In August 2013, President Obama named Swire as one of five members of the Director of National Intelligence Review Group on Intelligence and Communications Technologies.

== Education ==
Swire graduated summa cum laude with an A.B. degree from the Woodrow Wilson School of Public and International Affairs at Princeton with a concentration in economics in 1980. Swire also earned a membership in the Phi Beta Kappa society. After earning his undergraduate degree, Swire studied at the Université libre de Bruxelles on a Rotary International Ambassadorial Scholarship. In 1985, Swire graduated from Yale Law School where he was the senior editor of the Yale Law Journal. Upon graduation, Swire clerked for the Honorable Ralph K. Winter Jr. at the United States Court of Appeals for the Second Circuit from 1985 to 1986.

== Career ==
Swire started his professional career as an associate for Powell, Goldstein, Frazer & Murphy in Washington, D.C. In 1990, he began his academic career as an associate professor at the University of Virginia School of Law. Swire began teaching at Ohio State University in 1996, but left the university in April 1999 to become the first Chief Counselor for Privacy in the Office of Budget and Management during the Clinton administration.

As the chief counselor for privacy in the Clinton administration, Swire became known as a behind-the-scenes go-to guy. Swire shepherded the creation of the HIPAA Privacy Rule by working with the Department of Health and Human Services to create a proposed privacy rule. The proposed privacy rule was opened up for public comment and generated over 52,000 comments. The final text of the rule was announced by President Bill Clinton and the Secretary of Health and Human Services, Donna Shalala on December 20, 2000. During his time in the Clinton administration, Swire also chaired a 15-agency White House Working Group on updating wiretap law for the Internet age.

In early 2001, Swire resumed his position at Ohio State, and became director in 2002 of the Washington D.C. Summer Program for the Moritz College of Law. In 2005, Swire was named the C. William O'Neil Professor in Law and Judicial Administration at the Moritz College of Law of Ohio State University. Swire has researched many elements of technology law, including privacy, data brokering, electronic surveillance, and computer security. He is a founding faculty editor of I/S: A Journal of Law and Policy for the Information Society and with Jonathan Zittrain is the editor of Cyberspace Law Abstracts of the Social Science Research Network.

During the Obama-Biden transition, Swire worked on teams for the Federal Trade Commission and Federal Communications Commission, and served as counsel to the New Media Team. In 2009 and 2010, Swire took leave from law teaching to enter the Obama administration, in the National Economic Council. He was special assistant to President Obama for economic policy, working primarily on housing and technology issues.

In November 2012, Swire was named as co-chair of the Tracking Protection Working Group of the World Wide Web Consortium (W3C), to attempt to mediate a global Do Not Track standard. He resigned in August 2013.

In the wake of Edward Snowden's unlawful leaks of documents about international espionage in 2013, Swire was appointed to the Director of National Intelligence Review Group on Intelligence and Communications Technologies by President Obama. The report was subsequently republished by the Princeton University Press.

In Fall 2013, Swire accepted the Nancy J. and Lawrence P. Huang Professor in the Scheller College of Business at the Georgia Institute of Technology. Swire's responsibilities include teaching, research, and service as a part of the Law and Ethics program. In March, 2015, Swire received the International Association of Privacy Professionals Privacy Leadership Award.

In January 2015, law firm Alston & Bird hired Swire as senior counsel in its privacy & data security practice.

In Fall 2017, Swire accepted the Elizabeth & Tommy Holder Chair in the Scheller College of Business at the Georgia Institute of Technology.

In April 2018, Swire was named a 2018 Andrew Carnegie Fellow by the Carnegie Corporation of New York.

In February 2021, Swire was honored by the Future of Privacy Forum (FPF) as a winner of its Privacy Papers for Policymakers award. Swire received this recognition for his co-authored paper entitled "After Schrems II: A Proposal to Meet the Individual Redress Problem."

In March 2025, the International Association of Privacy Professionals (IAPP) recognized Swire as part of its "25 Leaders, 25 Moments at 25 Years" series. Swire was honored as the author of IAPP's first textbook on privacy.

== See also ==
- NSA warrantless surveillance controversy
- Electronic evidence
- Security through obscurity
- I/S: A Journal of Law and Policy for the Information Society
- Patriot Debates
- USA PATRIOT Act, Title II
