= Kate Martin (jurist) =

American legal scholar

Kate Martin is the director of the Center for National Security Studies. She is an expert in national security and civil liberties issues, including government secrecy, intelligence, terrorism, and enemy combatant detentions. She was formerly a lecturer at Georgetown University Law School, and has also worked in the position of general counsel to the National Security Archive, a research library located at George Washington University. She is currently a member of the Constitution Project's bipartisan Liberty and Security Committee.

From: USA PATRIOT Act, Title II Section 203 Kate Martin, the director of the Center for National Security Studies, argued that section 203 and 905 should be modified as she maintains the Act fails to discriminate between information gathered between terrorist and non-terrorist investigations. She believes that the Act should be modified to include some privacy safeguards: before information is gathered she believes that the court should approve the information transfer to make sure that it is necessary for ongoing activities by the agencies involved; that information shared should be limited to information relevant to investigations into terrorism; that only those people who have access to such information should actually need it to do their jobs (currently those who are not directly related to the investigation can gain access to the information); and information gathered should be marked as confidential and measures put into place to stop the inappropriate dissemination of such information.[1] Her views were opposed by Viet Dinh, who believed that such alterations would hinder terrorism investigations.
