= Trap and trace device =

Phone call routing process

A trap and trace device captures incoming phone calls to a particular number, similar to a how a pen register captures outgoing phone calls.

== Description ==
Title 18 of the United States Code defines a trap and trace device as follows:

The term "trap and trace device" means a device or process which captures the incoming electronic or other impulses which identify the originating number or other dialing, routing, addressing, and signaling information reasonably likely to identify the source of a wire or electronic communication, provided, however, that such information shall not include the contents of any communication

A trap and trace device shows what numbers had called a specific telephone—‌i.e., all incoming phone numbers. A pen register rather would show what numbers a phone had called—‌i.e., all outgoing phone numbers. The two terms are often used in concert, especially in the context of Internet communications. They are often jointly referred to as "Pen Register or Trap and Trace devices" to reflect the fact that the same program will probably do both functions in the modern era, and the distinction is not that important. The term "pen register" is often used to describe both pen registers and trap and trace devices.

== Relevance to USA PATRIOT Act ==
Uses of trap and trace devices are a sunset provision of the USA PATRIOT Act. Prior to the enactment of the USA PATRIOT Act, the Foreign Intelligence Surveillance Act was exempt from laws regarding the acquisition of "dialing, routing, addressing, or signaling information, ... provided, however, that such information shall not include the contents of any communication." Along with giving the government easier access to communications between the sender and receiver, section 214 of PATRIOT ACT eliminated the prerequisite that the government prove that the suspect is, "an agent of foreign power". The use of trap and trace orders are still prohibited for activities that are protected under the First Amendment.

== Notes ==
1. 18 U.S.C. § 3127(4)
