= Title VIII of the Patriot Act =

Section of US anti-terrorism bill

Title VIII: Strengthening the criminal laws against terrorism is the eighth of ten titles which comprise the USA PATRIOT Act, an anti-terrorism bill passed in the United States one month after the September 11, 2001 attacks. Title VIII contains 17 sections and creates definitions of terrorism, and establishes or re-defines rules with which to deal with it.

== Attacks on mass transportation systems ==
The U.S. Code has a number of regulations concerning railroads. Section 801 added a new section that punishes those who

- wreck, demolish, set fire to, or disables a mass transportation vehicle or ferry,
- uses a biological agent or toxin on a train or mass transportation device, without previously obtaining the permission of the mass transportation provider, to cause injury or death,
- places any biological agent or toxin as a weapon near the facilities of a railroad in order to derail, disable, or wreck the transportation mechanisms,
- does something to impair the running of the transportation system, including removing or damaging a train control system, centralized dispatching system, or rail grade crossing warning signal,
- interferes with, disables, or incapacitates any dispatcher, train driver, captain, or person while they are dispatching, operating, or maintaining a mass transportation vehicle or ferry in order to cause harm or death to passengers,
- does something to cause death or serious bodily injury to an employee or passenger of a mass transportation provider, or
- makes false allegations that an attempt or alleged attempt is being undertaken to perform a prohibited activity on a mass transportation system

If such an offense is committed, then the offender is to be fined and/or imprisoned for not more than twenty years. However, if the activity was undertaken while the mass transportation vehicle or ferry was carrying a passenger at the time of the offense, or the offense resulted in the death of any person, then the punishment is a fine and/or life imprisonment.

== Biological weapons ==
Section 817 of the Patriot Act expands the biological weapons statute. 18 U.S.C. § 175 was amended to define the use of a biological agent, toxin, or delivery system as a weapon, other than when it is used for "prophylactic, protective, bona fide research, or other peaceful purposes". The Patriot Act created a penalty of more than 10 years imprisonment, a fine for anyone who cannot prove reasonably that they are using a biological agent, toxin, or delivery system for these purposes, or both. Section 817 also prevents certain people from shipping, transporting or receiving a select biological agent Those who are restricted are those who are under indictment or have been convicted of a crime that is punishable with a jail sentence of over a year, is a fugitive from justice, convicted drug users, illegal aliens, aliens from certain countries that have been deemed to have provided support for acts of international terrorism, and those who are mentally ill and who have been committed to a mental institution. Penalties for those who are prohibited from transporting or receiving selected agents are fines, punishment of not more than 10 years imprisonment, or both.

== Terrorist support ==
A number of measures were undertaken in an attempt to prevent and penalize activities that are deemed to support terrorism. Section 803 of the Patriot Act amends the statute on terrorism to include a new section to prevent the harboring of or concealment of terrorists. This states than any person who "harbors or conceals" someone whom they know or believe to have committed an offense designated under 11 specific other codes will be subject to a fine or imprisonment of up to ten years, or both. These violations may be prosecuted in any Federal judicial district where the offense was committed, or in another Federal district as provided by law.

Section 805 modifies the statute on providing material support to terrorists so that a person being prosecuted "may be prosecuted in any Federal judicial district" where the offense was committed, "or in any other Federal judicial district as provided by law." It also adds four codes to be considered under the title. 18 U.S.C. § 2339A defines "providing material support to terrorists" in subsection (b). Section 805 changes this definition by adding "expert advice or assistance" and "monetary instruments."

Section 807 of the Patriot Act made a technical clarification that nothing in the Trade Sanctions Reform and Export Enhancement Act of 2000 would limit criminal prohibitions against the provision of material support to terrorists and terrorist organizations.

Section 806 of the Patriot Act amends U.S. forfeiture law to allow authorities to seize all foreign and domestic assets from any group or individual that is caught planning to commit acts of terrorism against the U.S. or U.S. citizens. Assets may also be seized if they have been acquired or maintained by an individual or organization for the purposes of further terrorist activities.

== Penalties ==
A number of penalties for terrorism offenses were defined or amended by Title VIII. Section 809 removed the statute of limitations on prosecution for any terrorist offense that led to the death or injury of any person, while section 810 increased the maximum penalty for destroying an energy facility, providing material support to terrorists or terrorist organizations, destroying national-defense materials, sabotaging nuclear facilities or fuel or the damage or destruction an interstate gas or hazardous liquid pipeline facility from not more than 20 years imprisonment to any prison term. Conspiracy provisions were added by section 811 to criminal statutes that cover arson within the special maritime and territorial jurisdiction of the United States, killings in Federal facilities, the destruction of communications lines, stations, or systems, the destruction of property within the special maritime and territorial jurisdiction of the United States, wrecking trains, material support to terrorists, torture, the sabotage of nuclear facilities or fuel, interfering with flight crews, the carrying on of weapons or explosives on an aircraft, and the destruction of interstate gas or hazardous liquid pipeline facility. Furthermore, section 812 of the Patriot Act specifies that there is to be post-release supervision of terrorists for the rest of their lives, if they committed a terrorist act that resulted in, or created a foreseeable risk of, death or serious bodily injury to another person.

== Cyberterrorism and cybersecurity ==
Several aspects of cyberterrorism are dealt with in title VIII. Under section 814 of the Patriot Act, it is clarified that punishments apply to those who either damage or gain unauthorized access to a protected computer and thus cause a person an aggregate loss greater than $5,000; adversely affects someone's medical examination, diagnosis or treatment; causes a person to be injured; causes a threat to public health or safety; or causes damage to a governmental computer that is used as a tool to administer justice, national defense, or national security. It is only through these specific actions that civil action may be taken against an offender. Section 814 also prohibits any extortion via a protected computer, and not just extortion against a "firm, association, educational institution, financial institution, government entity, or other legal entity". Punishments were expanded to include attempted illegal use or access of protected computers. The punishment for attempting to damage protected computers through the use of viruses or other software mechanism is now imprisonment for not more than 10 years, while the punishment for unauthorized access and subsequent damage to a protected computer is now more than five years imprisonment. Should the offense occur a second time, the penalty increases to no more than 20 years imprisonment. The Federal sentencing guidelines were amended to allow any individual convicted of computer fraud and abuse to be subjected to appropriate penalties, without regard to any mandatory minimum term of imprisonment.

Section 816 specifies the development and support of cybersecurity forensic capabilities. It directs the Attorney General to establish regional computer forensic laboratories that have the capability of performing forensic examinations of intercepted computer evidence relating to criminal activity and cyberterrorism, and that have the capability of training and educating Federal, State, and local law enforcement personnel and prosecutors in computer crime, and to "facilitate and promote the sharing of Federal law enforcement expertise and information about the investigation, analysis, and prosecution of computer-related crime with State and local law enforcement personnel and prosecutors, including the use of multijurisdictional task forces". US$50,000,000 was authorized for establishing such labs.

== Records ==
Under section 815 of the Patriot Act, an additional defense was added against civil actions where it is alleged that there were unlawful violations of access to stored communications and the interception of communications. It allows an ISP to show a good faith reliance on requests from a governmental entity that orders them to preserve records and other evidence in its possession pending the issuance of a court order or other process.

== Definitions ==
Title VIII defines or redefines a number of terms. The terms "domestic terrorism" is already defined under 18 U.S.C. § 2331 and this was amended by section 802 of the Patriot Act to include mass destruction as well as assassination or kidnapping as a terrorist activity. The definition encompasses activities that are "dangerous to human life that are a violation of the criminal laws of the United States or of any State" and are intended to "intimidate or coerce a civilian population", "influence the policy of a government by intimidation or coercion" or are undertaken "to affect the conduct of a government by mass destruction, assassination, or kidnapping" while in the jurisdiction of the United States.

When investigating international terrorism, the Attorney General can investigate:

- the willful production of defective national-defense material, national-defense premises, or national-defense utilities,
- the destruction or interference of a submarine mine, torpedo, fortification or harbor-defense system, or violates any Presidential Executive Order governing persons or vessels within the limits of defensive sea areas,18 U.S.C. § 2152
- an assault on the President of the United States, the President-elect, the Vice President or the next in line,
- an assault on a United States Member of Congress or a Member-of-Congress-elect,
- the destruction of an energy facility,
- a raid or predatory attack of any U.S. property
- the conspiracy to damage or destroy specific property situated within a foreign country belonging to a foreign government with which the U.S. is at peace
- the destruction of any building, vehicle, or other personal or real property that is leased or owned by the U.S. government through the use of fire or an explosive,
- threats made to kill or injure another person

A further amendment made the following activities part of the definition of "International terrorism":

- the destruction of aircraft or aircraft facilities
- violence at international airports
- arson within special maritime and territorial jurisdictions
- use of biological weapons
- use of the variola virus
- use of chemical weapons
- the kidnapping or assassination of congressional, cabinet, and Supreme Court members
- the use of nuclear materials in a terrorist act
- participation in nuclear and weapons of mass destruction threats to the U.S.
- the use of plastic explosives
- the arson and bombing of Government property risking or causing death
- the arson and bombing of property used in interstate commerce
- the killing or attempted killing during an attack on a Federal facility with a dangerous weapon
- the conspiracy to murder, kidnap, or maim persons abroad
- unauthorised access to protected computers
- the killing or attempted killing of officers and employees of the U.S.,
- the murder or manslaughter of foreign officials, official guests, or internationally protected persons
- hostage taking
- the depredation of government property or contracts
- the destruction of communication lines, stations, or systems
- injury to buildings or property within special maritime and territorial jurisdiction of the U.S.
- the destruction of an energy facility
- Presidential and Presidential staff assassination and kidnaping
- the wrecking of trains
- terrorist attacks and other acts of violence against mass transportation systems
- the destruction of national defense materials, premises, or utilities
- offenses relating to national defense material, premises, or utilities
- violence against maritime navigation
- violence against maritime fixed platforms
- homicides and other violence against U.S. nationals outside of the U.S.
- the use of weapons of mass destruction
- acts of terrorism transcending national boundaries,
- the bombing of public places and facilities
- the use of anti-aircraft missile systems
- the use of radiological dispersal devices
- harboring terrorists
- providing material support to terrorists
- providing material support to terrorist organizations
- the financing of terrorism, or
- torture
- the sabotage of nuclear facilities or fuel
- airline piracy, assault on a flight crew with a dangerous weapon, endangering human life by using explosive or incendiary devices on aircraft, homicide or attempted homicide on an aircraft
- destruction of interstate gas or hazardous liquid pipeline facility.

Section 813 included acts of terrorism as racketeering activity.

Section 804 amends 18 U.S.C. § 7: Special maritime and territorial jurisdiction of the United States defined. 18 U.S.C. § 7 is a list of things or places that fall within the "special maritime and territorial jurisdiction of the United States" within the usage of Title 18, the title of the U.S.C. that deals with crime. It is amended so that when a crime is committed by or against a U.S. national, "the premises of United States diplomatic, consular, military or other United States Government missions or entities in foreign States" are considered to be part of the aforesaid jurisdiction. This includes "residences in foreign States...irrespective of ownership, used for purposes of those missions or entities or used by United States personnel...." It ends by adding a clause saying that this paragraph does not trump any international agreement that it comes into conflict with, and that it does not apply to members of the Armed forces who commit an offense outside the U.S. that would have resulted in a year or longer imprisonment had it been committed within the U.S.

Under section 814, a number of terms relating to cyberterrorism were redefined. A "protected computer" was expanded to include a "computer located outside the United States that is used in a manner that affects interstate or foreign commerce or communication of the United States", "damage" means any impairment to the integrity or availability of data, a program, a system, or information, "conviction" now includes a conviction under the law of any State for a crime punishable by imprisonment for more than 1 year, where the crime involved the unauthorized access of a protected computer, "loss" means "any reasonable cost to any victim, including the cost of responding to an offense, conducting a damage assessment, and restoring the data, program, system, or information to its condition prior to the offense, and any revenue lost, cost incurred, or other consequential damages incurred because of interruption of service", and "person" means "any individual, firm, corporation, educational institution, financial institution, governmental entity, or legal or other entity."
