= Dow Chemical Co. v. United States =

- Supreme Court of the United States

Argued December 10, 1985 Decided May 19, 1986
- Full case name: Dow Chemical Company v. United States
- Citations: 476 U.S. 227 (more) 106 S. Ct. 1819; 90 L. Ed. 2d 226
- Argument: Oral argument

Case history
- Prior: Summary judgment for plaintiff, 536 F. Supp. 1355 (E.D. Mich. 1982); reversed on appeal, 749 F.2d 307 (6th Cir. 1984); cert. granted, 472 U.S. 1007 (1985).

Holding
- The Fourth Amendment protects against the invasion of areas where intimate activities occur, whereas "the open areas of an industrial complex are more comparable to an 'open field' in which an individual may not legitimately demand privacy."

Court membership
- Chief Justice Warren E. Burger Associate Justices William J. Brennan Jr. · Byron White; Thurgood Marshall · Harry Blackmun; Lewis F. Powell Jr. · William Rehnquist; John P. Stevens · Sandra Day O'Connor

Case opinions
- Majority: Burger, joined by White, Rehnquist, Stevens, O'Connor
- Concur/dissent: Powell (concur Part III, dissent Parts I-II), joined by Brennan, Marshall, Blackmun

Laws applied
- U.S. Const. amend. IV

Dow Chemical Co. v. United States, 476 U.S. 227 (1986), was a United States Supreme Court case decided in 1986 dealing with the right to privacy and advanced technology of aerial surveillance.

== Factual background and decision ==
The EPA used, without a search warrant, a commercial aerial photographer to get photographs of a heavily guarded Dow facility that was, according to the petitioner, protected by the State Trade Secret Law. The decision was as follows:

For purposes of aerial surveillance, the open areas of an industrial complex are more comparable to an "open field" in which an individual may not legitimately demand privacy. In the absence of a "reasonable expectation of privacy" the Fourth Amendment prohibiting unreasonable searches does not apply.

== See also ==
- Aerial surveillance doctrine
- California v. Ciraolo, 476 U.S. 207 (1986)
- California v. Greenwood, 486 U.S. 35 (1988)
- Curtilage
- Expectation of privacy
- Florida v. Riley, 488 U.S. 445 (1989)
- Kyllo v. United States, 533 U.S. 27 (2001)
- Open-fields doctrine
