= Aerial surveillance doctrine =

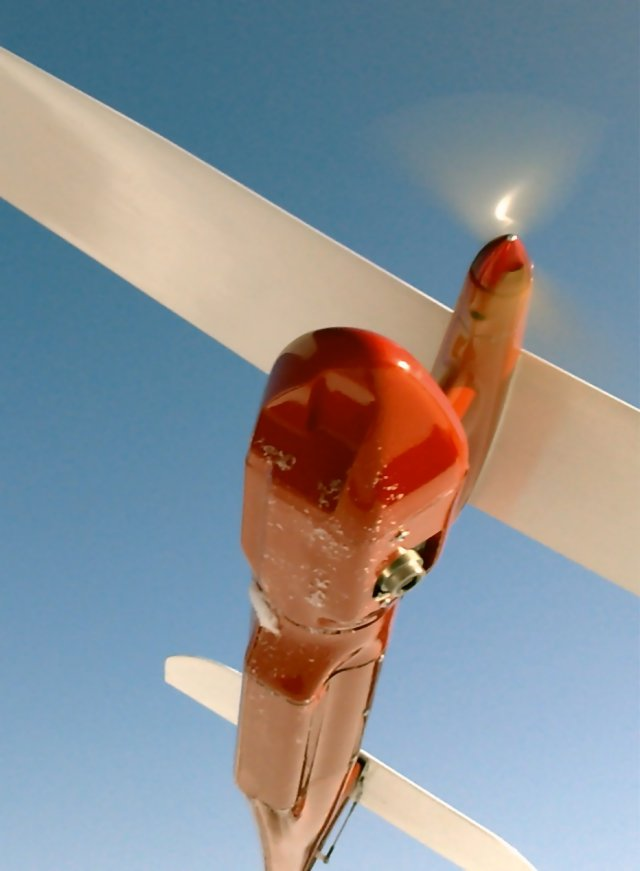
Unmanned aerial vehicle (UAV)

The aerial surveillance doctrine is the legal doctrine in the United States of America that under the Fourth Amendment, aerial surveillance of an individual’s property does not inherently constitute a search for which law enforcement must obtain a warrant. Courts have used several factors–sometimes only one or a few, other times many or all of them–to determine whether the surveillance in question is a search in violation of one’s constitutional rights: the object of the surveillance (whether it is commercial property or an individual’s home or curtilage), the technology employed (whether, on the basis of its capabilities, it simply enables “naked eye” observations or allows the user to acquire otherwise unobtainable information), the duration of the surveillance, scope of aggregated information (whether it is limited or extensive in nature), and the vantage point from which the surveillance is conducted (whether it is from a place that one can reasonably expect to be observed).

== History ==
=== California v. Ciraolo ===
The aerial surveillance doctrine’s place in Fourth Amendment jurisprudence first surfaced in California v. Ciraolo (1986). In this case, the U.S. Supreme Court considered whether law enforcement’s warrantless use of a private plane to observe, from an altitude of 1,000 feet, an individual’s cultivation of marijuana plants in his yard constituted a search under the Fourth Amendment. The Court held that no search occurred, as police officers conducted the surveillance from “public navigable airspace,” not prohibited airspace, and simply “observe[d] plants readily discernible to the naked eye as marijuana.” The Court thus noted that “[a]ny member of the public flying in this airspace who glanced down could have seen everything that these officers observed.” For this reason, the Court opined, the defendant did not have a reasonable expectation of privacy, the controlling Fourth Amendment standard.

The four-member dissent, led by Justice Powell, criticized the majority’s line of reasoning. The Justices wrote that “[t]he risk that a passenger on such a plane might observe private activities, and might connect those activities with particular people, is simply too trivial to protect against.”

=== Dow Chemical Co. v. United States ===
The Court decided its next major aerial surveillance case on the same day as Ciraolo. In Dow Chemical Co. v. United States (1986), the Environmental Protection Agency (EPA) employed a commercial aerial photographer, who used a “standard floor-mounted, precision aerial mapping camera” to take pictures of Dow Chemical’s facility from altitudes of 12,000, 3,000, and 1,200 feet. As in Ciraolo, the Court held that EPA’s aerial photography did not constitute a search under the Fourth Amendment. The Court’s conclusion rested on several grounds: (1) the photographs were “not so revealing of intimate details,” (2) the object of the surveillance–Dow Chemical Co.’s more than 2,000 acre plant–was “not analogous to the ‘curtilage,’” and (3) Dow Chemical Co.’s plant was commercial property, where “the expectation of privacy . . . differs significantly from the sanctity accorded an individual’s home.”

Once again, a four-member dissent by the same dissenting Justices from Ciraolo took issue with the majority opinion. Led by Justice Powell, they argued that because the aerial surveillance “penetrated into a private commercial enclave, an area in which society has recognized that privacy interests legitimately may be claimed” and “captured highly confidential information,” the EPA’s actions constituted a search.

=== Florida v. Riley ===
The third U.S. Supreme Court case that handled aerial surveillance was Florida v. Riley (1989). The facts here closely paralleled those in Ciraolo. After receiving an anonymous tip that the defendant was growing marijuana on his property, law enforcement used a helicopter to conduct aerial surveillance, from a height of 400 feet, of his property. A plurality of four Justices held that Ciraolo controlled this case and found that because police were “free to inspect the [defendant’s] yard from the vantage point of an aircraft flying in the navigable airspace,” no search occurred.

Justice O’Connor wrote a separate concurrence, in which she agreed with the Court’s judgment, but not its rationale. Justice O’Connor opined that the plurality’s approach rested “too heavily on compliance with [Federal Aviation Administration] FAA regulations whose purpose is to promote air safety,” not safeguard constitutional rights. In line with the reasonable expectation of privacy standard from Katz v. United States (1967), she argued that the appropriate question the Court should consider was whether the aerial surveillance was conducted from “an altitude at which members of the public travel with sufficient regularity that [the defendant’s] expectation of privacy . . . was not ‘one that society is prepared to recognize as ‘reasonable.’”

== Evolution of the aerial surveillance doctrine ==
Since Ciraolo, Dow Chemical Co., and Riley, lower federal courts and state courts alike have grappled with the question of under what circumstances aerial surveillance constitutes a search. In cases with similar facts as Ciraolo and Riley, courts have typically held that law enforcement’s conduct did not rise to the level of a search. In 2016, the United States District Court for the Northern District of Alabama held in United States v. Wideman that the “aerial observation of the marijuana plants on [a defendant’s] property was not a search.” Six years later, in State v. Jordan, the Ohio Court of Appeals held that police’s observations of a defendant’s marijuana plants from a helicopter did not violate the Fourth Amendment because he failed to prove that he had a reasonable expectation of privacy.

Cases with more novel circumstances, such as those in which law enforcement employed more advanced technology or surveilled an individual for an extended period of time, have forced courts to interpret and even re-tool the aerial surveillance doctrine.

=== Novel technology and aerial surveillance ===
In Dircks v. Ind. Dep’t of Child Servs., the court considered whether the plaintiffs plausibly alleged a claim that the local fire department’s use of a drone over their home and property violated their reasonable expectation of privacy under the Fourth Amendment. The court determined that Ciraolo, Dow Chemical Co., and Riley were not controlling because the drone observed “each window of Plaintiffs’ residence and outbuildings” and was “outside [law enforcement’s] visual line of sight,” violating both federal and Indiana law. Further distinguishing this case from U.S. Supreme Court precedent was the court’s view that “drones are inherently different in character than helicopters and airplanes,” as “[t]hey can navigate at lower heights and into intimate spaces,” where “individual[s] would reasonably expect privacy.” Because no “bright-line rules about drone use under the Fourth Amendment” existed, the court used a “fact-intensive inquiry” to determine that the plaintiffs sufficiently raised “a Fourth Amendment claim for the drone search.”

=== Extended duration and aerial surveillance ===
In Leaders of a Beautiful Struggle v. Balt. Police Dep’t., the subject of the plaintiffs’ lawsuit was the Baltimore Police Department (BPD)’s use of “aerial technology–planes equipped with high-tech cameras–to surveil Baltimore City.” Though the city’s Aerial Investigation (AIR) program indisputably involved aerial surveillance, the Fourth Circuit opined that the AIR program’s “‘aerial’ nature is only incidental to Plaintiffs’ claims,” and thus Court precedent like Ciraolo did not govern this case. Rather, “[i]t is precedents concerning privacy in ‘physical location and movements’ that control” this case. Relying on recent U.S. Supreme Court cases, namely Carpenter v. United States, the court found that because the “AIR program records the movements of a city," it could "reveal where individuals come and go over an extended period,” allowing “police to deduce from the whole of individuals’ movements.”

What these cases, among others, underscore is that the aerial surveillance doctrine only provides courts with a blueprint–not a clear, unambiguous pathway–to reach a judgment in Fourth Amendment cases. As Leaders of a Beautiful Struggle showcases, the aerial nature of a surveillance program may not matter to a court when determining whether a search occurred. When the aerial nature of the surveillance is critical, as it was in Dircks, U.S. Supreme Court precedent may not be controlling when the aerial technology is unlike the helicopters and airplanes in Ciraolo and its companion cases. Ultimately, there is a confluence of factors that courts consider in their Fourth Amendment inquiries. These factors include everything from the altitude and view of the aerial surveillance technology, speed of the deployed device, nature of the technology, and duration of the surveillance.

== Future implications ==
As aerial surveillance technology grows more sophisticated, courts will be forced to assess if and how Fourth Amendment jurisprudence might evolve. No technology better embodies this challenge than drones, whose “inconspicuous, efficient, and cheap” nature will only encourage their proliferated use. To date, many states have sought to address this challenge through legislation. Thus far, 16 of them have passed laws requiring that law enforcement obtain a search warrant before using drones for surveillance purposes.

== See also ==
- Open-fields doctrine
- Plain view doctrine
- Third-party doctrine
