= California v. Greenwood =

- Supreme Court of the United States

Argued January 11, 1988 Decided May 16, 1988
- Full case name: California v. Billy Greenwood and Dyanne Van Houten
- Citations: 486 U.S. 35 (more) 108 S. Ct. 1625; 100 L. Ed. 2d 30; 56 U.S.L.W. 4409

Case history
- Prior: Drug charges against defendants dismissed by California Superior Court (unpublished). Affirmed, California Court of Appeal, 182 Cal.App.3d 729 (1986). Cert. granted, 483 U.S. 1019 (1987).

Holding
- The Fourth Amendment does not prohibit the warrantless search and seizure of waste left for collection outside the curtilage of a home. California Court of Appeal reversed.

Court membership
- Chief Justice William Rehnquist Associate Justices William J. Brennan Jr. · Byron White; Thurgood Marshall · Harry Blackmun; John P. Stevens · Sandra Day O'Connor; Antonin Scalia · Anthony Kennedy

Case opinions
- Majority: White, joined by Rehnquist, Blackmun, Stevens, O'Connor, Scalia
- Dissent: Brennan, joined by Marshall
- Kennedy took no part in the consideration or decision of the case.

Laws applied
- U.S. Const. amends. IV, XIV; Cal. Const., Art. I, § 28(d)

California v. Greenwood, 486 U.S. 35 (1988), was a case in which the Supreme Court of the United States held that the Fourth Amendment does not prohibit the warrantless search and seizure of garbage left for collection outside the curtilage of a home.

This case has been widely cited as "trashing" the Fourth Amendment with critics stating "the decision fails to recognize any reasonable expectation of privacy in the telling items Americans throw away" and that those who wish to preserve the privacy of their trash must now "resort to other, more expensive, self-help measures such as an investment in a trash compactor or a paper shredder."

== Background ==
In early 1984, Investigator Jenny Stracner of the Laguna Beach Police Department learned from various sources that Billy Greenwood might be selling illegal drugs out of his single-family home. In April, Stracner asked the neighborhood's regular trash collector to pick up the plastic garbage bags that Greenwood left on the curb in front of his house. In the garbage, she found evidence of drug use. She used that information to obtain a warrant to search Greenwood's home. When officers searched the house, they found cocaine and marijuana. Greenwood and Dyanne Van Houten were arrested and released on bail.

In May, another investigator again had the garbage collectors pick up the garbage bag left on the curb. The garbage again contained evidence of drugs, the police obtained another search warrant, and they found more drugs and evidence of drug trafficking in the house.

The California Superior Court dismissed the charges against Greenwood and Van Houten on the ground that unwarranted trash searches violated the U.S. Constitution's Fourth Amendment, as well as the California Constitution. The Court of Appeal affirmed. The Supreme Court of California refused to hear the appeal. The U.S. Supreme Court granted certiorari and reversed the judgment of the California Court of Appeal.

== Opinion of the Court ==
By a 6–2 vote (Justice Kennedy took no part in the case), the Court held that under the Fourth Amendment, no warrant was necessary to search the trash because Greenwood had no reasonable expectation of privacy in it. Although Greenwood had hidden the trash from view by putting it in opaque plastic bags and expected it to be on the street only a short time before it would be taken to the dump, the Court believed it to be "common knowledge" that garbage at the side of the street is "readily accessible to animals, children, scavengers, snoops, and other members of the public." Moreover, Greenwood had left the trash there expressly so that the trash collector, a stranger, could take it. Quoting Katz v. United States, the court concluded that "[w]hat a person knowingly exposes to the public, even in his own home or office, is not a subject of Fourth Amendment protection."

Greenwood argued that the evidence should be excluded under the California Constitution, which the California Supreme Court had interpreted to prohibit warrantless searches of garbage left at the curb (People v. Krivda, 1971). However, the Constitution had been amended in 1982 by the passage of Proposition 8, also known as the "Victims' Bill of Rights". One of its provisions, the Truth-in-Evidence Act, eliminated the exclusionary rule for unconstitutionally obtained evidence. The Court rejected Greenwood's claim that the amendment violated the Due Process Clause. It held that so long as the police conduct did not violate federal law, "California could permissibly conclude that the benefits of excluding relevant evidence of criminal activity do not outweigh the costs."

== Dissent ==
Justice Brennan reasoned that the possibility the police or other "unwelcome meddlers" might rummage through the trash bags "does not negate the expectation of privacy in their contents any more than the possibility of a burglary negates an expectation of privacy in the home." Under United States v. Chadwick, the bags could not have been searched without a search warrant had Greenwood been carrying them in public. Merely leaving them on the curb for the garbage man to collect, Brennan argued, should not be found to remove that expectation of privacy, for "scrutiny of another's trash is contrary to commonly accepted notions of civilized behavior."

== See also ==
- California v. Ciraolo, 476 U.S. 207 (1986)
- Curtilage
- Dow Chemical Co. v. United States, 476 U.S. 227 (1986)
- Expectation of privacy
- Florida v. Riley, 488 U.S. 445 (1989): No warrant needed for observations from public airspace.
- Garbage theft
- Kyllo v. United States, 533 U.S. 27 (2001)
- List of United States Supreme Court cases by the Rehnquist Court
- Open-fields doctrine
- Surreptitious DNA collecting
