= Horton v. California =

- Supreme Court of the United States

Argued February 21, 1990 Decided June 4, 1990
- Full case name: Terry Brice Horton v. California
- Citations: 496 U.S. 128 (more) 110 S. Ct. 2301; 110 L. Ed. 2d 112; 1990 U.S. LEXIS 2937; 58 U.S.L.W. 4694

Case history
- Prior: In re Horton, No. H002749 (Cal. Ct. App. filed Feb. 14, 1983) pet. denied.

Holding
- The Fourth Amendment does not prohibit the warrantless seizure of evidence in plain view even though the discovery of the evidence was not inadvertent. Although inadvertence is a characteristic of most legitimate plain-view seizures, it is not a necessary condition.

Court membership
- Chief Justice William Rehnquist Associate Justices William J. Brennan Jr. · Byron White; Thurgood Marshall · Harry Blackmun; John P. Stevens · Sandra Day O'Connor; Antonin Scalia · Anthony Kennedy

Case opinions
- Majority: Stevens, joined by Rehnquist, White, Blackmun, O'Connor, Scalia, Kennedy
- Dissent: Brennan, joined by Marshall

Laws applied
- U.S. Const. amend. IV

Horton v. California, 496 U.S. 128 (1990), was a United States Supreme Court case in which the Court held that the Fourth Amendment does not prohibit the warrantless seizure of evidence which is in plain view. The discovery of the evidence does not have to be inadvertent, although that is a characteristic of most legitimate plain-view seizures. The opinion clarified the plain view doctrine of the Court's Fourth Amendment analysis.

== Background ==
As he entered his garage Erwin Wallaker was robbed (Note: Wallaker was the treasurer of the San Jose Coin Club) of jewelry and cash by two men, one armed with a machine gun and one with a stun gun. Wallaker recognized one of the robbers' voices as that of Terry Brice Horton. The police submitted a request for a warrant to search Horton's home for both weapons and the proceeds of the robbery, but the magistrate who issued the warrant only authorized a search for the proceeds of the robbery. During the subsequent search, the police found weapons and other items which were not listed on the warrant. (Note: This included an Uzi, a .38-caliber revolver, and stun guns.) None of the stolen property was found.

=== Lower courts ===
Horton was charged with the robbery and moved to suppress the weapons as being illegally seized. The police officer, Sergeant LaRault, testified that he was looking for any evidence that would show that Horton had committed the robbery. The trial court, relying on a California Supreme Court case, North v. Superior Court, (Note: The California Supreme Court in North determined that a U.S. Supreme Court decision on the issue in Coolidge v. New Hampshire was a plurality decision and not binding precedent.) refused to suppress the weapons, and Horton was convicted. The California Court of Appeals affirmed, and the California Supreme Court denied review.

== Opinion of the Court ==
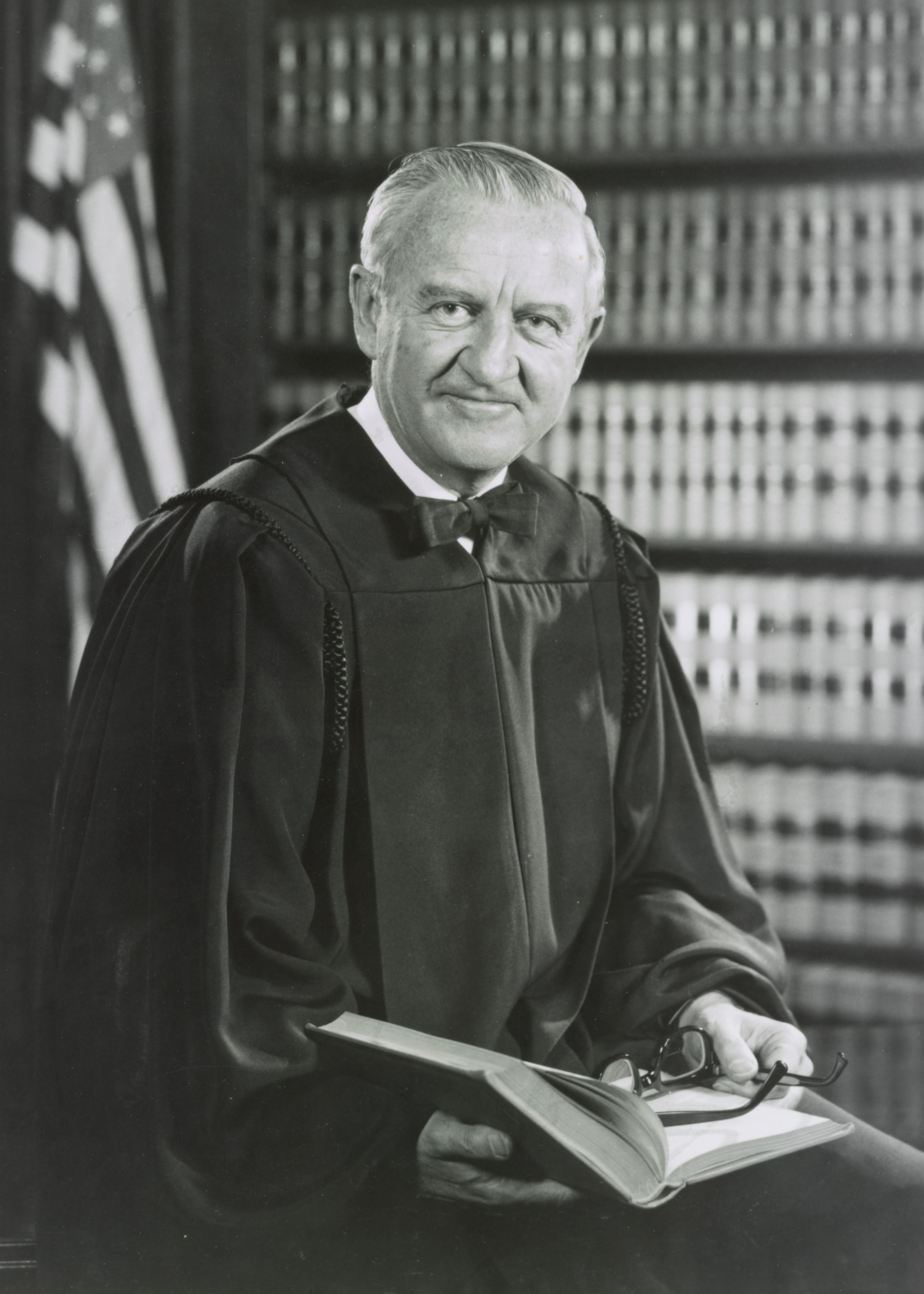
Justice John P. Stevens, author of the majority opinion.

Justice John Paul Stevens delivered the opinion of the Court in a 7–2 vote affirming the judgment of the California Court of Appeals. He first noted that the Fourth Amendment protected property against both search and seizure. In Arizona v. Hicks (1987), the Court had determined that if an object was in "plain view", then it did not involve any expectation of privacy that would prevent it from being "searched" or "seized". The issue here was whether Justice Stewart's opinion in Coolidge v. New Hampshire (1971) required that the plain view be inadvertent, with Justice Stevens noting that it was not binding precedent. First, the nature of the object being evidence must be readily apparent. A requirement for any warrantless seizure is that "the officer be lawfully located in a place from which the object can be plainly seen, but he or she must also have a lawful right of access to the object itself."

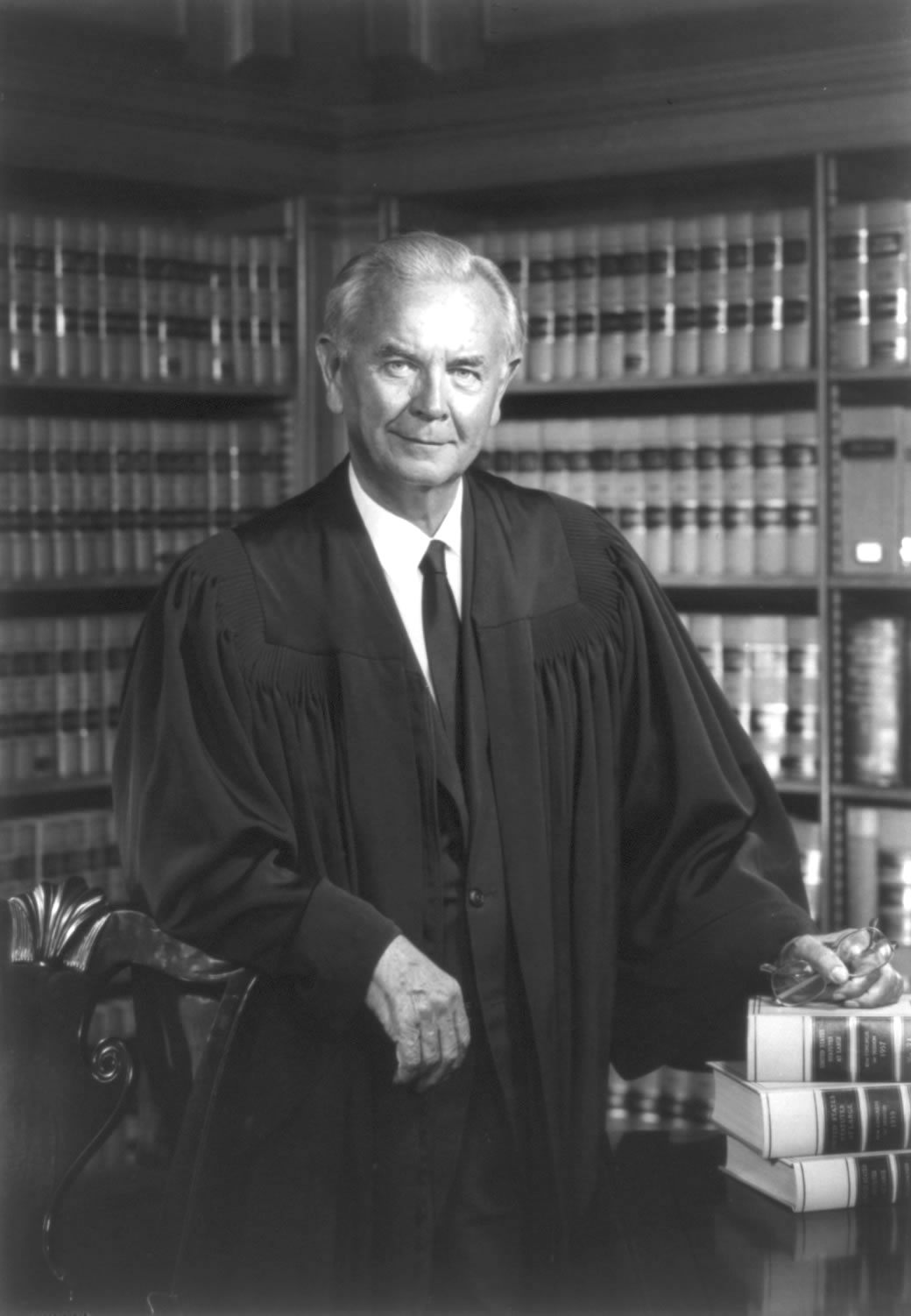
Justice William J. Brennan, Jr., author of the dissenting opinion.

Justice Stevens also looked at the dissent from Coolidge, where Justice White had said:

Let us suppose officers secure a warrant to search a house for a rifle. While staying well within the range of a rifle search, they discover two photographs of the murder victim, both in plain sight in the bedroom. Assume also that the discovery of the one photograph was inadvertent but finding the other was anticipated. The Court would permit the seizure of only one of the photographs. But in terms of the 'minor' peril to Fourth Amendment values there is surely no difference between these two photographs: the interference with possession is the same in each case and the officers' appraisal of the photograph they expected to see is no less reliable than their judgment about the other. And in both situations the actual inconvenience and danger to evidence remain identical if the officers must depart and secure a warrant.

Justice Stevens stated that he preferred an objective test rather than a subjective test, and noted that every place that was searched was authorized to be searched under the warrant.

=== Dissent ===
Justice Brennan, joined by Justice Marshall, dissented from the Court's opinion. He believed that Justice Stewart's opinion in Coolidge was the correct interpretation of the plain view doctrine. (Note: Stewart outlined a three part test, that the "(1) the officers are lawfully in a position to observe the items, (2) the discovery of the items is 'inadvertent,' and (3) it is immediately apparent to the officers that the items are evidence of a crime, contraband, or otherwise subject to seizure.") Brennan noted that a warrantless search was per se unreasonable unless it met a warrant exception. A warrant had to describe, with particularity, the items to be searched for and seized. He believed that unless the discovery of the evidence in plain view was inadvertent, as Justice Stewart had outlined the doctrine in Coolidge, it would excuse officers who do not have a warrant that describes the items to be seized with the required particularity.

Justice Brennan also believed that the majority's opinion only addressed the privacy issue of a person's property, and ignored the possessory issues. He claimed that this could lead to pretext searches, which in his view should be suppressed.

== Subsequent developments ==
=== Expansion of plain view doctrine ===
Scholars immediately commented that the decision might be "one of the most functionally expansive decisions" reached that session.

=== Computer searches ===
The use of the Horton plain view doctrine has had an unintended consequence in searches of electronically stored information (ESI), effectively turning searches of ESI into general searches. (Note: Three federal circuits (1st, 3d, and 4th) allow this type of search. Two circuits (7th and 10th) have required that the discovery of evidence other than that being sought be inadvertent. Finally, the Ninth Circuit required the government to waive use of other evidence in order for a warrant to be issued, although they later relaxed the requirement to a guideline.)
