= California v. Ciraolo =

- Supreme Court of the United States

Argued December 10, 1985 Decided May 19, 1986
- Full case name: California v. Ciraolo
- Citations: 476 U.S. 207 (more) 106 S. Ct. 1809; 90 L. Ed. 2d 210

Case history
- Prior: Pleaded guilty in trial court; reversed by California Court of Appeal

Holding
- The Fourth Amendment was not violated by the naked-eye aerial observation of respondent's backyard.

Court membership
- Chief Justice Warren E. Burger Associate Justices William J. Brennan Jr. · Byron White; Thurgood Marshall · Harry Blackmun; Lewis F. Powell Jr. · William Rehnquist; John P. Stevens · Sandra Day O'Connor

Case opinions
- Majority: Burger, joined by White, Rehnquist, Stevens, O'Connor
- Dissent: Powell, joined by Brennan, Marshall, Blackmun

Laws applied
- U.S. Const. amend. IV

California v. Ciraolo, 476 U.S. 207 (1986), was a decision by the Supreme Court of the United States in which the Court held that aerial observation of a person's backyard by police, even if done without a search warrant, does not violate the Fourth Amendment to the U.S. Constitution.

In the case, police in Santa Clara, California flew a private airplane over the property of Dante Ciraolo and took aerial photographs of his backyard after receiving an anonymous tip that he was growing marijuana plants.

Some legal scholars have called this case "the demise of private property" and that it contradicts prior case law such as Katz v. United States stating that, "Distinguishing ground level observation from aerial observation for purposes of interpreting the Fourth Amendment signals a return to the analysis adhered to in pre-Katz cases, namely a reliance upon the physical position of the observer rather than upon the privacy interests of the observed."

== Background ==
Dante Carlo Ciraolo grew marijuana plants in his backyard, shielded from view by two fences. After receiving an anonymous tip, the Santa Clara police sent officers in a private airplane to fly over and take aerial photographs of his property at an altitude of 1,000 feet. Based on an officer's naked eye observation, a search warrant was granted. After the trial court rejected Ciraolo's motion to suppress the evidence (under the exclusionary rule), he pleaded guilty. The California Court of Appeal reversed the decision, holding that the aerial observation was an intrusion into the curtilage of his home and therefore the Fourth Amendment.

== Opinion of the Court ==
Chief Justice Warren Burger wrote for the 5-4 majority, referring to Katz v. United States. He concluded, “The Fourth Amendment simply does not require the police traveling in the public airways at this altitude to obtain a warrant in order to observe what is visible to the naked eye.”

== Dissenting opinion ==
Justice Powell wrote a dissenting opinion, in which Justices Brennan, Marshall, and Blackmun joined. Also citing Katz, Powell argued that the decision ignored that case's two-part test.

In arguing that Ciraolo did have a reasonable expectation of privacy, Powell notes:

the actual risk to privacy from commercial or pleasure aircraft is virtually nonexistent. Travelers on commercial flights, as well as private planes used for business or personal reason, normally obtain at most a fleeting, anonymous, and nondiscriminating glimpse of the landscape and buildings over which they pass. The risk that a passenger on such a plane might observe private activities, and might connect those activities with particular people, is simply too trivial to protect against.

== See also ==
- List of United States Supreme Court cases, volume 476
- List of United States Supreme Court cases
- Lists of United States Supreme Court cases by volume
- List of United States Supreme Court cases by the Rehnquist Court
- Aerial surveillance doctrine
- California v. Greenwood, 486 U.S. 35 (1988)
- Curtilage
- Dow Chemical Co. v. United States, 476 U.S. 227 (1986)
- Florida v. Riley, 488 U.S. 445 (1989)
- Kyllo v. United States, 533 U.S. 27 (2001)
- Open-fields doctrine
