= Therese Slone-Baker =

U.S. Air Force officer

- Born: October 11, 1917; New York City, New York, United States
- Died: February 10, 2013 (aged 95) San Antonio, Texas, U.S.
- Allegiance: United States
- Branch: United States Army; United States Air Force
- Service years: 1945-46, 1956-72
- Rank: Lieutenant colonel
- Conflicts: World War II

Therese Mary Slone-Baker (née Slone; October 11, 1917 - February 10, 2013) was an officer of the United States Air Force.

== Army service ==
A first-generation American, Slone worked as a secretary, at the Social Security Administration and the United States Maritime Commission, before joining the Women's Army Corps in the waning months of the Second World War. In the Army, under the command of Manton S. Eddy, she developed recruitment plans in conjunction with the American Legion.

== Inter-service years ==
Having mustered out of the Army in 1946 as a technical sergeant, she spent a few unhappy years as a civilian before returning to the military. In 1951, she received a direct commission as a second lieutenant in the United States Air Force.

Between 1953 and 1956, she worked as a civilian at Edwards Air Force Base.

== Air Force service ==
Recalled to active duty in 1956, she began her Air Force career as a recruiter for the Women's Air Force; recruiting on college campuses throughout Texas, Oklahoma, Arkansas, Louisiana, and New Mexico. She also served in post-war Germany and at Lackland Air Force Base.

A captain by 1960, she continued her work in recruitment in Ohio, drawing up new means to attract more recruits.

In June 1966, after an overseas tour at Ramstein Air Base, she was promoted to major.

She retired from the Air Force in 1972, as a lieutenant colonel.

== Later years ==
In August 1975, Slone married Thomas Baker, thus becoming Slone-Baker; in her own words, "I didn't marry until after I retired because my goal was set on furnishing myself security and not relying on anyone else. I'm stubborn that way."

In the 1980s and 1990s, Slone-Baker became active in promoting the remembrance of women veterans in the United States military. In particular, she advocated for the Women in Military Service for America Memorial; by reminding women veterans to register for the memorial. She noted that women were sometimes difficult to track after leaving service because of name changes, due to marriage, so registering themselves was important.

She also served as the president of the Women's Overseas Service League.

Eventually settling in San Antonio, Slone-Baker died there in February 2013.
