= Coolidge v. New Hampshire =

1971 U.S. Supreme Court case on police searches of automobiles

- Supreme Court of the United States

Argued January 12, 1971 Decided June 21, 1971
- Full case name: Edward Coolidge v. New Hampshire
- Citations: 403 U.S. 443 (more) 91 S. Ct. 2022; 29 L. Ed. 2d 564

Case history
- Prior: 109 N.H. 403, 260 A.2d 547 (1969); cert. granted, 399 U.S. 926 (1970).

Holding
- The warrant for the search and seizure of petitioner's automobile did not satisfy the requirements of the Fourth Amendment, because it was not issued by a "neutral and detached magistrate."

Court membership
- Chief Justice Warren E. Burger Associate Justices Hugo Black · William O. Douglas; John M. Harlan II · William J. Brennan Jr. Potter Stewart · Byron White; Thurgood Marshall · Harry Blackmun

Case opinions
- Majority: Stewart (Part III), joined by Burger, Douglas, Harlan, Brennan, Marshall
- Majority: Stewart (Parts I, II-D), joined by Douglas, Harlan, Brennan, Marshall
- Plurality: Stewart (Parts II-A, II-B, II-C), joined by Douglas, Brennan, Marshall
- Concurrence: Harlan
- Concur/dissent: Burger
- Concur/dissent: Black, joined by Burger, Blackmun (as to Parts II and III and a portion of Part I)
- Concur/dissent: White, joined by Burger

Laws applied
- U.S. Const. amend. IV
- Superseded by
- Horton v. California, 496 U.S. 128 (1990).

Coolidge v. New Hampshire, 403 U.S. 443 (1971), was a United States Supreme Court case dealing with the Fourth Amendment and the automobile exception.

The state sought to justify the search of a car owned by Edward Coolidge, suspected of killing 14-year-old Pamela Mason in January 1964, on three theories: automobile exception, search incident to arrest and plain view.

== Facts ==
Pamela Mason, a 14-year-old from Manchester, New Hampshire, placed an advertisement in the window of a local merchant offering her services as a babysitter. On January 13, 1964, Mason entered the car of a man who had called her and had stated his need for a babysitter. Eight days later, Mason was found stabbed and shot to death in a snowbank near Manchester. The state attorney general took charge of police activities relating to the murder. When the police applied for a warrant to search suspect Coolidge's automobile, the attorney general authorized it. Local police had also taken items from Coolidge's home during the course of an interview with his wife. Coolidge was found guilty and sentenced to life imprisonment.

== Opinion of the court ==
In a decision in which a number of justices chose to concur in part and dissent in part, the court held that the searches and seizures of Coolidge's property were unconstitutional. Justice Stewart's opinion held that the warrant authorizing the seizure of Coolidge's automobile was invalid because it was not issued by a "neutral and detached magistrate." Justice Stewart also rejected New Hampshire's arguments in favor of making an exception to the warrant requirement. He held that neither the "incident to arrest" doctrine nor the "plain view" doctrine justified the search, and that an "automobile exception" was inapplicable. The court noted that although the "automobile exception" exists, "the word 'automobile' is not a talisman in whose presence the fourth amendment fades away and disappears...".

== Aftermath ==
Without their crucial evidence, the state negotiated a plea bargain by which Coolidge agreed to plead guilty to a second-degree murder charge with a sentence of 19–25 years.

Coolidge was released from prison in 1982, having obtained parole. He later maintained his innocence in Mason's murder and other murders for which he was suspected.
