= Patricia Denkler =

Former United States Navy aviator (born 1952)

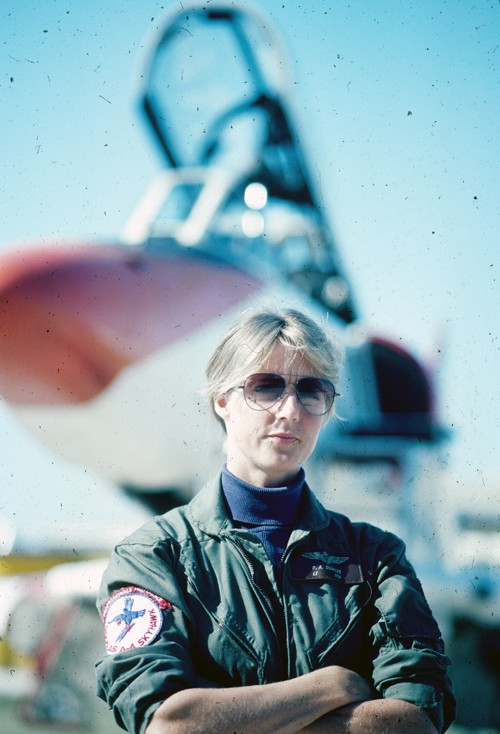
- Born: April 10, 1952 (age 74)
- Education: University of West Florida
- Occupation: United States Navy Aviator
- Employer: Delta Air Lines
- Known for: First Navy woman to be carrier qualified in a jet aircraft

Patricia Anne Denkler (born April 10, 1952) is a former American naval aviator and retired commercial airline pilot. She was the first woman from the United States Navy to become carrier qualified in a jet aircraft.

== Biography ==
Denkler was born in 1952 as the daughter of Shirley Moseley and William Denkler, a United States Navy Commander and combat pilot who flew in both World War II and the Korean War. Patricia Denkler began flying as a private pilot in 1975, flying tailwheel-type aircraft and gaining aerobatics experience in biplanes.

=== Navy aviator ===
In 1977, Patricia Denkler met then Commander John McCain, who encouraged her to apply to the Navy Flight Program. The U.S. Navy only began accepting women pilots in 1973. She applied for Aviation Officer Candidate School and was accepted for the October 1977 class. At that time, approximately fifteen women were selected per year.

After earning her wings in 1979, Denkler was chosen to be a selectively retained graduate. She was recognized as an above average aviator and continued in the flight training program as an instructor after graduation. During her time in the Navy, she became the first female naval aviator to carrier qualify in a jet aircraft. In 1981, she became the first woman to land a jet on an aircraft carrier when she flew a TA-4J aboard the USS Lexington. In 1982, she became the first woman to land a fleet combat aircraft, the A6E Intruder on a carrier. At the time, Denkler said that her flights were kept quiet to avoid controversy.

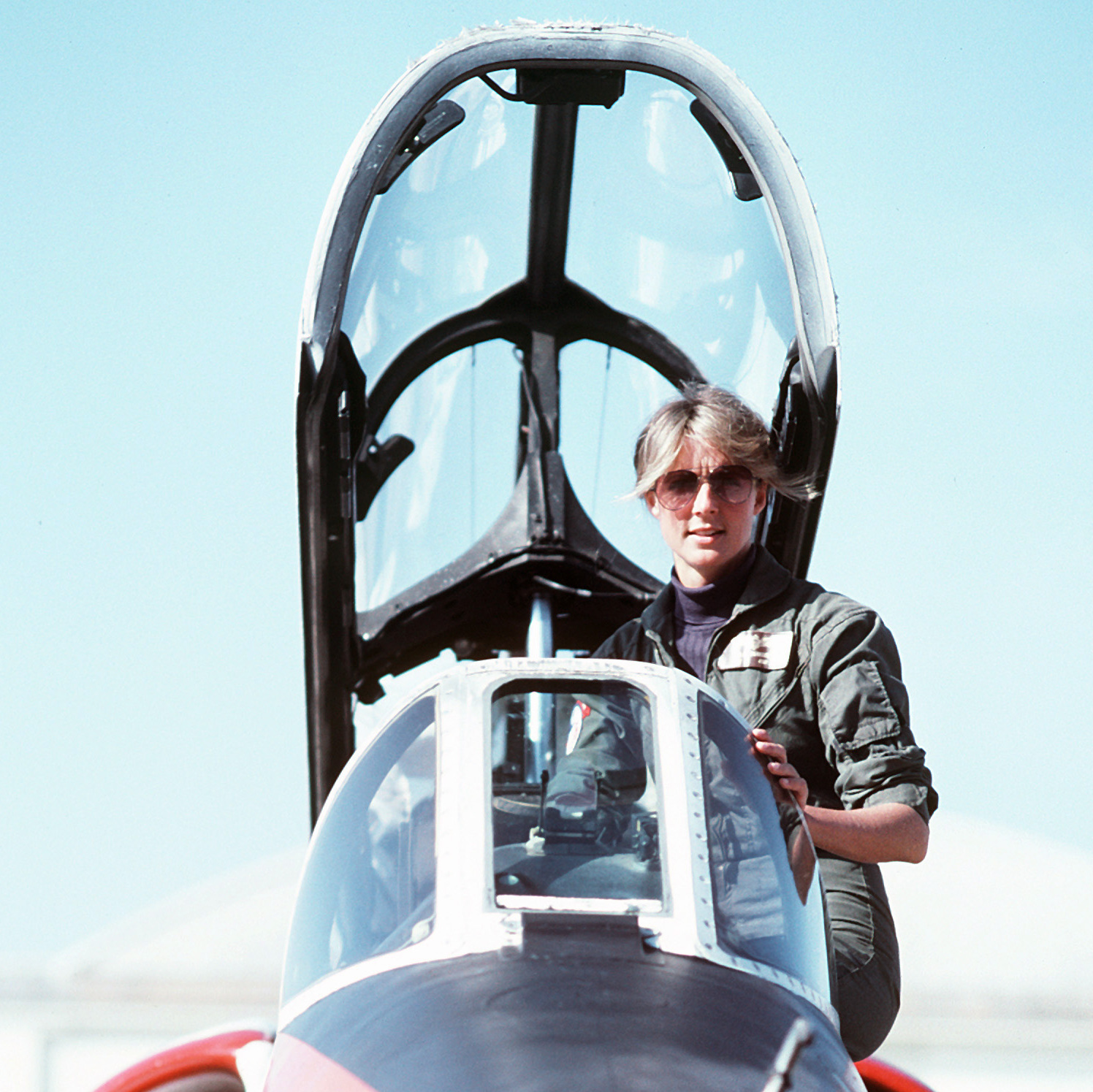
U.S. Navy Lt. Patricia A. Denkler, assigned to Training Squadron 4 (VT-4), performs a preflight check on a Douglas TA-4J Skyhawk aircraft at Naval Air Station Pensacola, Florida (US), in 1982. Denkler became the first U.S. Navy woman to be carrier qualified in a jet aircraft when she landed aboard the aircraft carrier USS Lexington in September 1982.

Denkler's aviation career in the Navy was limited by restrictions that prevented women from flying in combat roles. Afterwards, she said, "It's not right that it is that way, but that's the black-and white reality of life...Things have progressed at a slow rate and a frustrating rate for the individual, but it has continued to progress".

=== Later life ===
In 1985, Denkler transitioned from the Navy to become a pilot at Delta Air Lines, where she was the fourth woman pilot in the company. She would go on to work for Delta for the next 31 years. In 1988, she moved to Beaufort, South Carolina.

== See also ==
- Barbara Allen Rainey, first woman aviator in the United States Navy
- Women in the United States Navy
