= Women in the military in the Americas =

This article is about the role played by women in the military in the Americas, particularly in the United States and Canada from the First World War to modern times.

== Brazil ==
The first participation of a woman in combat occurred in 1823. Maria Quitéria de Jesus fought for the maintenance of the independence of Brazil, and is considered the first woman to enlist in a military unit. However, it was not until 1943, during World War II, that women officially entered the Brazilian Army. They included 73 nurses, 67 of them registered nurses and six air transport specialists. They served in four different hospitals in the US Army. All volunteered for the mission and were the first women to join the active service of the Brazilian armed forces. After the war, as well as the rest of the FEB, the nurses, most have been awarded, they won the official patent and licensed the active military service.

In 1992, the School of Army Administration (Salvador - BA) enrolled the first group of 49 women, by conducting tender. And in 1996, Maria Quitéria de Jesus, the Paladina of Independence, was recognized in the army ranks, as Patron of Table Complementary Brazilian Army officers. The Army established the Military Female Volunteer for Medical, Dental, Pharmaceutical, Veterinary and top-level Nurses (MFDV) in 1996. At that time, they entered the first class of 290 female volunteers to provide military service in healthcare. This merger took place in all twelve military regions of the country.

In 1997 the Military Institute of Engineering—IME (Rio de Janeiro—RJ) enrolled the first group of 10 women students to be included in Table Military Engineers (QEM). In the same year the School of the Army Health—Essex (Rio de Janeiro RJ) enrolled and graduated the first group of medical officers, dentists, pharmaceutical, veterinary and top-level nurses in the framework of the Army Health.

In 1998, the Army established the Stage Technical Service for higher education professionals than healthcare. At that time, he entered the first class of 519 women lawyers, administrators of businesses, accountants, teachers, computer analysts, engineers, architects, journalists, and other areas of human and exact sciences, serving the needs of Official Temporary Technical (OTT) of Institution. In 2001 the Army Health School allowed the enrollment of women to participate in the public tender for the filling of vacancies in the Health Sergeant Course, which started to operate in 2002.

== Canada ==
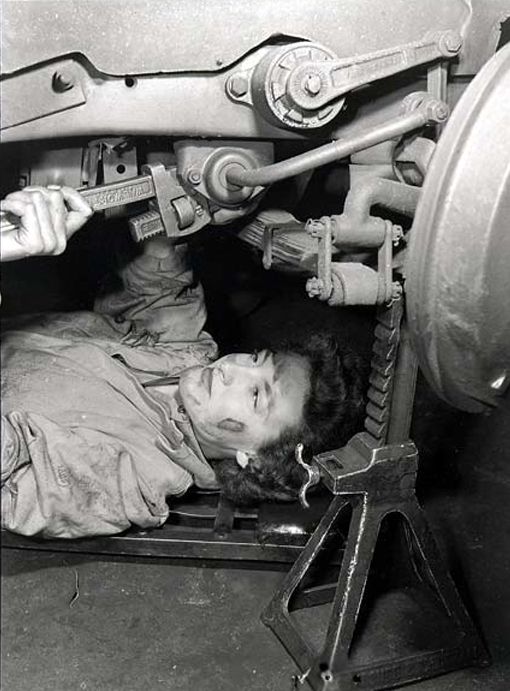
Private Lowry, CWAC, tightening up the springs on the front of her vehicle, Chelsea & Cricklewood Garage, England, 7 July 1944.

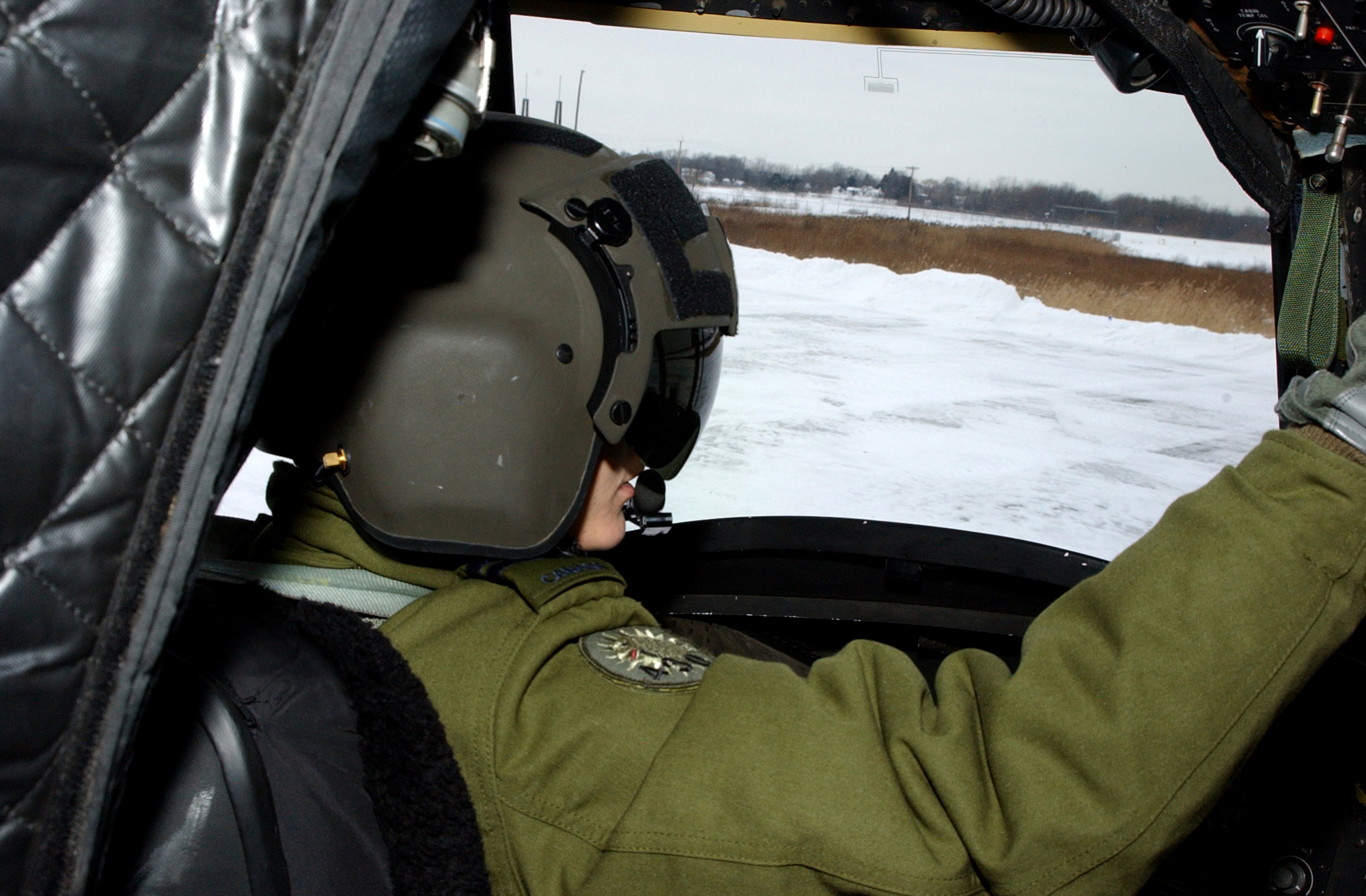
Female Canadian Forces pilot

During the First World War, over 2,300 women served overseas in the Canadian Army Medical Corps. Canadian women were also organized into possible uniformed home guard units, undertaking military training in paramilitary groups. During the Second World War, 5,000 women of the Royal Canadian Army Medical Corps again served overseas, however they were not permitted to serve on combat warships or in combat teams. The Canadian Army Women's Corps was created during the Second World War, as was the Royal Canadian Air Force (Women's Division). As well, 45,000 women served as support staff in every theatre of the conflict, driving heavy equipment, rigging parachutes, and performing clerical work, telephone operation, laundry duties and cooking. Some 5,000 women performed similar occupations during Canada's part in the Korean War of 1950–1953.

In 1965 the Canadian government decided to allow a maximum of 1,500 women to serve directly in all three branches of its armed forces, and the former "women's services" were disbanded. In 1970 the government created a set of rules for the armed forces designed to encourage equal opportunities. These included the standardization of enlistment criteria, equal pay and pensions, and allowing women to enroll in all aspects of the Canadian armed forces and making it possible for women to reach any rank. In 1974 the first woman, Major Wendy Clay, earned her pilot's wings in the newly integrated Canadian Forces, and four years later the first woman qualified for the Canadian skydiving demonstration team, the Skyhawks.

Between 1979 and 1985 the role of women expanded further, with military colleges allowing women to enroll. 1981 saw the first female navigator and helicopter pilot, and in 1982 laws were passed ending all discrimination in employment, and combat related roles in the Canadian armed forces were opened for women, with no restrictions in place, with the exception of the submarine service. In 1986 further laws were created to the same effect. The following years saw Canada's first female infantry soldier, first female gunner, and a female Brigadier-General.

In 1990 the Ministers Advisory Board on Women in the Canadian Forces was created, and in 1994 Wendy Clay was promoted to Major-General. In 2000 Major Micky Colton became the first female to log 5,000 flying hours in a C-130 Hercules. Women were permitted to serve on board Canadian submarines in 2002 with the acquisition of the Victoria-class submarine. Master Seaman Colleen Beattie became the first female submariner in 2003.

Canadian women have also become clearance divers, and commanded large infantry units and Canadian warships.

On May 17, 2006 Captain Nichola Goddard became the first Canadian woman killed in combat during operations in Afghanistan.

== United States ==
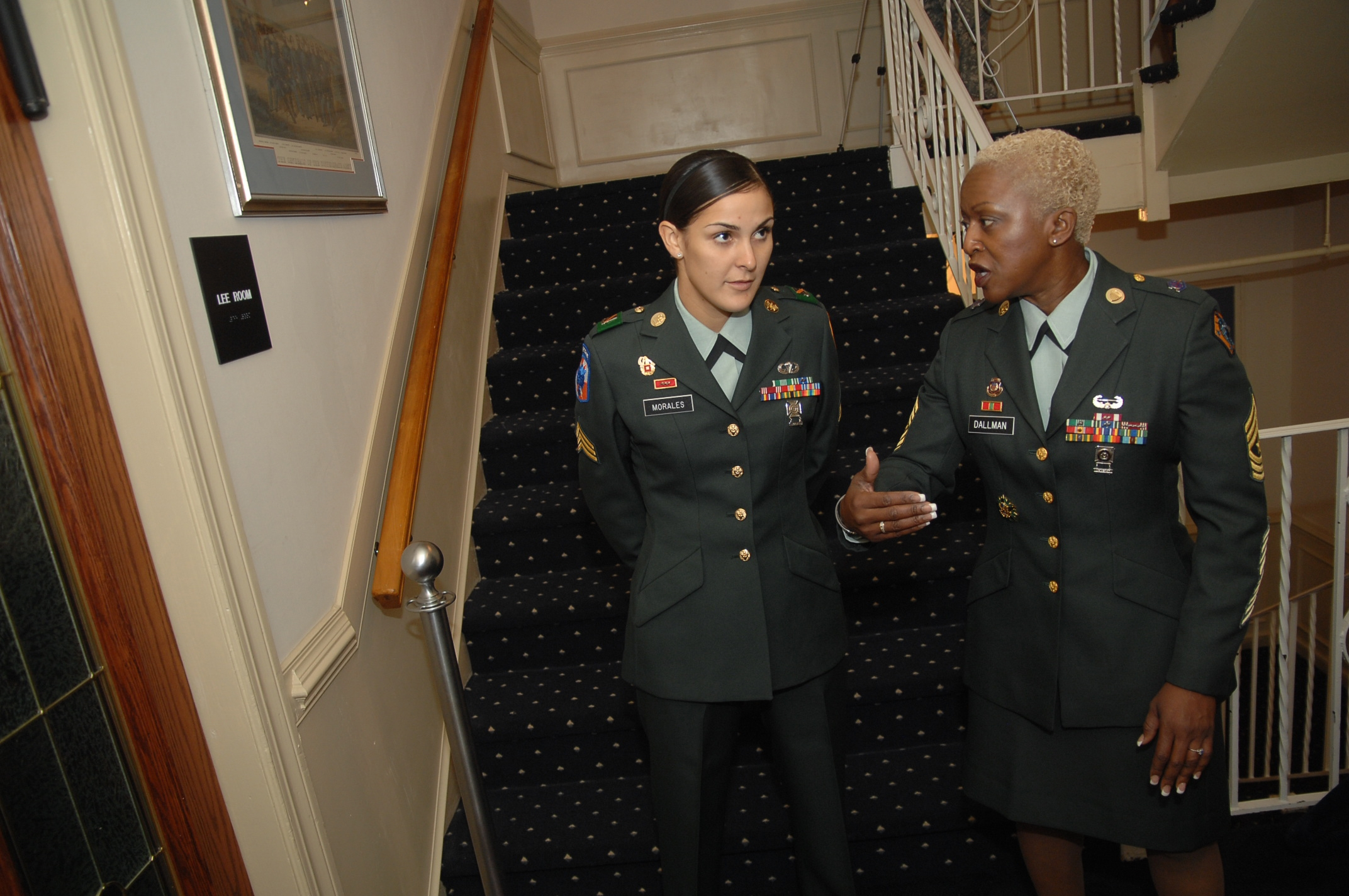
Two female U.S. Army soldiers in September 2008.

A few women fought in the American Army in the American Revolutionary War while disguised as men. Deborah Sampson fought until her sex was discovered and she was discharged, and Sally St. Clare died in the war. Anna Maria Lane joined her husband in the Army, and by the time of the Battle of Germantown, she was wearing men's clothes. According to the Virginia General Assembly, "in the revolutionary war, in the garb, and with the courage of a soldier, [Lane] performed extraordinary military services, and received a severe wound at the battle of Germantown."

The number of women soldiers in the American Civil War is estimated at between 400 and 750, although an accurate count is impossible because the women again had to disguise themselves as men.

The United States established the Army Nurse Corps as a permanent part of the Army in 1901; the Corps was all-female until 1955.

During World War I, 21,498 U.S. Army nurses (American military nurses were all women then) served in military hospitals in the United States and overseas. Many of these women were positioned near to battlefields, and they tended to over a million soldiers who had been wounded or were unwell. 272 U.S. Army nurses died of disease (mainly tuberculosis, influenza, and pneumonia). Eighteen African-American Army nurses served stateside caring for German prisoners of war (POWs) and African-American soldiers. They were assigned to Camp Grant, IL, and Camp Sherman, OH, and lived in segregated quarters. Hello Girls was the colloquial name for American female switchboard operators in World War I, formally known as the Signal Corps Female Telephone Operators Unit. During World War I, these switchboard operators were sworn into the Army Signal Corps. This corps was formed in 1917 from a call by General John J. Pershing to improve the worsening state of communications on the Western front. Applicants for the Signal Corps Female Telephone Operators Unit had to be bilingual in English and French to ensure that orders would be heard by anyone. Over 7,000 women applied, but only 450 women were accepted. Many of these women were former switchboard operators or employees at telecommunications companies. Despite the fact that they wore Army Uniforms and were subject to Army Regulations (and Chief Operator Grace Banker received the Distinguished Service Medal), they were not given honorable discharges but were considered "civilians" employed by the military, because Army Regulations specified the male gender. Not until 1978, the 60th anniversary of the end of World War I, did Congress approve veteran status and honorable discharges for the remaining women who had served in the Signal Corps Female Telephone Operators Unit. The first American women enlisted into the regular armed forces were 13,000 women admitted into active duty in the U.S. Navy during the war. They served stateside in jobs and received the same benefits and responsibilities as men, including identical pay (US$28.75 per month), and were treated as veterans after the war. The U.S. Marine Corps enlisted 305 female Marine Reservists (F) to "free men to fight" by filling positions such as clerks and telephone operators on the home front.

In January 1918, Myrtle Hazard became the first woman to enlist in the Coast Guard. She was the only woman to serve in the Coast Guard during the war and she is the namesake of USCGC Myrtle Hazard. Wartime newspapers erroneously reported that twin sisters Genevieve and Lucille Baker were the first women to serve in the Coast Guard. While they tried to enlist, they were not accepted.

Women who served during WWI were demobilized when hostilities ceased, and aside from the Nurse Corps the uniformed military became once again exclusively male. In 1942, women were brought into the military again, largely following the British model.

The Woman's Army Auxiliary Corps was established in the United States in 1942. However, political pressures stalled attempts to create more roles for women in the American Armed Forces. Women saw combat during World War II, first as nurses in the Pearl Harbor attacks on December 7, 1941. The Woman's Naval Reserve and Marine Corps Women's Reserve were also created during this conflict. In July 1943 a bill was signed removing 'auxiliary' from the Women's Army Auxiliary Corps, making it an official part of the regular army. In 1944 WACs arrived in the Pacific and landed in Normandy on D-Day. During the war, 67 Army nurses and 16 Navy nurses were captured and spent three years as Japanese prisoners of war. There were 350,000 American women who served during World War Two and 16 were killed in action; in total, they gained over 1,500 medals, citations and commendations.

Virginia Hall, serving with the Office of Strategic Services, received the second-highest US combat award, the Distinguished Service Cross, for action behind enemy lines in France. Hall, who had one artificial leg, landed clandestinely in occupied territory aboard a British Motor Torpedo Boat.

After World War Two, demobilization led to the vast majority of serving women being returned to civilian life. Law 625, The Women's Armed Services Act of 1948 was signed by President Truman, allowing women to serve in the armed forces in fully integrated units during peacetime, with only the WAC remaining a separate female unit. During the Korean War of 1950–1953 many women served in the Mobile Army Surgical Hospitals, with women serving in Korea numbering 120,000 during the conflict.

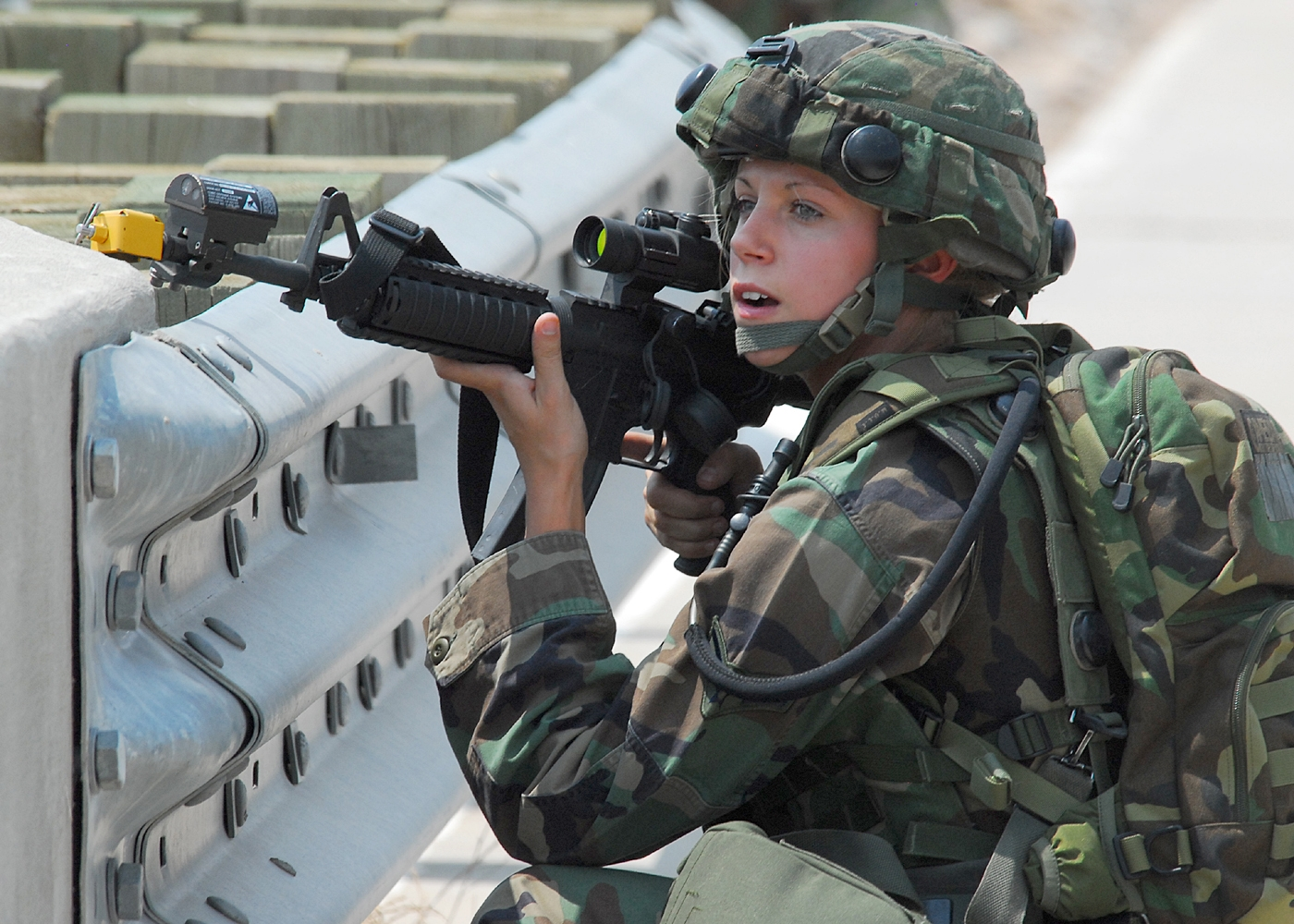
Airman 1st Class, Ashley Gonzalez of the United States Air force.

Records regarding American women serving in the Vietnam War are vague. However, it is recorded that 600 women served in the country as part of the Air Force, along with 500 members of the WAC, and over 6,000 medical personnel and support staff.

The Ordnance Corps began accepting female missile technicians in 1974, and female crewmembers and officers were accepted into Field Artillery missile units.

In 1974, the first six women aviators earned their wings as Navy pilots: Jane Skiles O'Dea, Barbara Allen Rainey, Rosemary Bryant Mariner, Judith Ann Neuffer, Ana Marie Fuqua, and Joellen Drag Oslund. The Congressionally mandated prohibition on women in combat places limitations on the pilots' advancement, but at least two retired as captains.

America's involvement in Grenada in 1983 saw over 200 women serving; however, none of these took part in direct combat. Some women, such as Lt Col Eileen Collins or Lt Celeste Hayes, flew transport aircraft carrying wounded or assault teams, however they were not deemed to have been in direct combat. Several hundred women took part in operations in Panama in 1989, in non-combat roles.

On December 20, 1989, Capt Linda L. Bray, 29, became the first woman to command American soldiers in battle, during the invasion of Panama. She was assigned to lead a force of 30 men and women MPs to capture a kennel holding guard dogs that was defended by elements of the Panamanian Defense force. From a command center about a half-mile from the kennel she ordered her troops to fire warning shots. The Panamanians returned fire until threatened by artillery attack, fleeing into nearby woods. Bray advanced to the kennel to try to stop them, using the cover of a ditch to reach the building. No enemy dead were found, but a cache of weapons was recovered.

The 1991 Gulf War brought greater media attention to the role of women in the American armed forces. A senior woman pilot at the time, Colonel Kelly Hamilton, commented that "[t]he conflict was an awakening for the people in the US. They suddenly realised there were a lot of women in the military." Over 40,000 women served in almost every role the armed forces had to offer. They were not permitted to participate in deliberate ground engagements. Many came under fire, however, and there are many reports of women engaging enemy forces. One example is that of the USS Mount HOOD, AE-29, Pacific Fleet ammunitions carrier in Battle Group Bravo. The Mt. Hood's sister ship, which was all male, was grounded after hitting a mine. The Mt. Hood, regardless of having at least 32 women on board, the first women to board that class of vessel in the USN, filled in. The women aboard the USS Mt. Hood, AE-29, may be the enlisted Navy's very first congressionally recognized females ordered to combat in a Congressionally declared war. That is not to say that they were the first females in combat because, as above illustrates, women have fought the front lines, whether they were afforded official Congressional recognition for their service or not. At any rate, this small ship tackled her duties and from the women leaders aboard came the first African-American female Admiral in the history of the United States Navy, Admiral and second in command of the United States Navy as Vice Chief of Naval Operations: Admiral Michelle Howard.

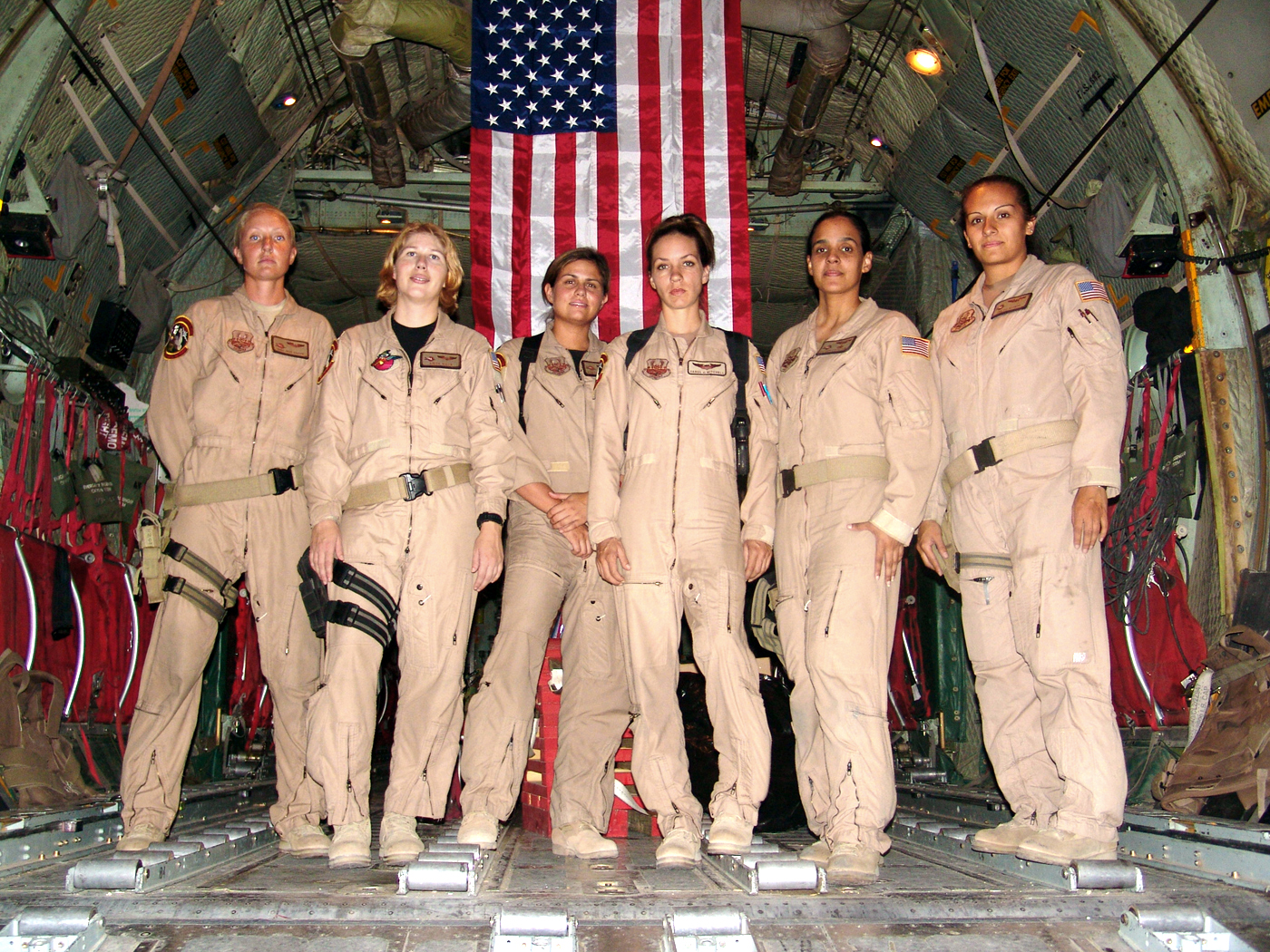
From 2005, the first all female C-130 Hercules crew to serve a combat mission for the U.S. Air Force.

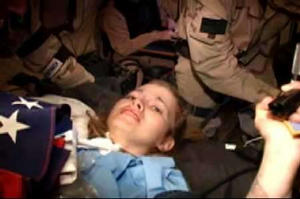
Jessica Lynch after being rescued in 2003

The 1996 case United States v. Virginia, in which the Supreme Court ordered that the Virginia Military Institute allow women to register as cadets, gave women soldiers a weapon against laws which (quoting Justice Ruth Bader Ginsburg) "[deny] to women, simply because they are women, full citizenship stature—equal opportunity to aspire, achieve, participate in and contribute to society."

Women in the U. S. military served in the Iraq War from 2003 until 2011. During the Battle of Nasiriyah in 2003, American soldiers Shoshana Johnson, the first African-American and first Hispanic female prisoner of war, and Jessica Lynch were captured while serving in Iraq. In the same action, Lori Piestewa, a U.S. soldier, died after driving her Humvee through enemy fire in an attempt to escape an ambush, earning a Purple Heart. She had just rescued Jessica Lynch, whose vehicle had crashed. Also in 2003, Major Kim Campbell was awarded the Distinguished Flying Cross for landing her combat damaged A-10 Thunderbolt II with no hydraulic control and only one functional engine after being struck by hostile fire over Baghdad. In 2005, U.S. Army Reservists Lynndie England and Sabrina Harman were convicted by court martial of cruelty and maltreatment of prisoners at Abu Ghraib prison.

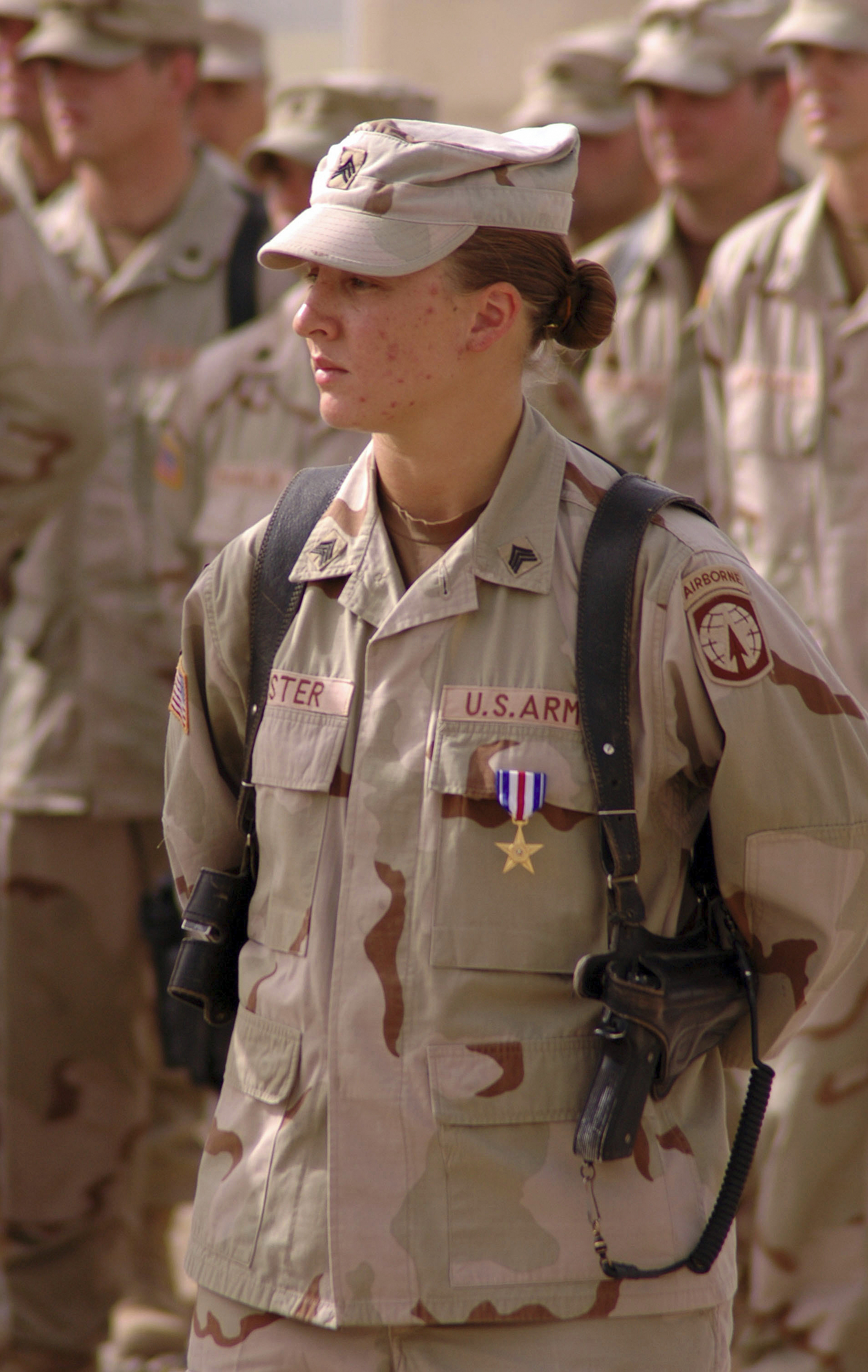
SGT Leigh Ann Hester, awarded the Silver Star for direct combat

In 2005 SGT Leigh Ann Hester became the first woman to receive the Silver Star, the third-highest US decoration for valor, for direct participation in combat. Female medical personnel had been awarded the same medal, but not for actual combat. She was a team leader of Raven 42, a Military Police squad that broke up an ambush in Iraq roughly three to four times its strength. Specialist Ashley Pullen received the Bronze Star. The squad leader, SSG Timothy Nein, had originally received the Silver Star, but his award was later upgraded to the Distinguished Service Cross. SGT Jason Mike, the unit's medic, also received the Silver Star.

In Afghanistan, Monica Lin Brown was presented the Silver Star for shielding wounded soldiers with her body, and then treating life-threatening injuries. As of March 2012, the U.S. military had two women, Ann E. Dunwoody and Janet C. Wolfenbarger, with the rank of four-star general.

In December 2015, Defense Secretary Ash Carter stated that starting in 2016 all combat jobs would open to women. In March 2016, Ash Carter approved final plans from military service branches and the U.S. Special Operations Command to open all combat jobs to women, and authorized the military to begin integrating female combat soldiers "right away."

In 2019 the United States Space Force was established as the sixth armed service branch of the United States, and Nina M. Armagno became the first female general in the United States Space Force in 2020.

Women in the U. S. military served in the Afghanistan War that began in 2001 and ended in 2021, and the American-led combat intervention in Iraq that began in 2014 and ended in 2021.

== See also ==
- Puerto Rican women in the military
- Women in the military
- Women in the military by country
- Women in the military in Europe
- List of women who sparked a revolution
