= Beech Aircraft Corp. v. Rainey =

Beech Aircraft Corporation v. Rainey
- Supreme Court of the United States

Argued October 4, 1988 Decided December 12, 1988
- Full case name: Beech Aircraft Corporation, Petitioner v. John C. Rainey, et al.
- Citations: 488 U.S. 153 (more) 109 S. Ct. 439; 102 L. Ed. 2d 445; 1988 U.S. LEXIS 5631; 57 U.S.L.W. 4043; 26 Fed. R. Evid. Serv. (Callaghan) 257; 1989 AMC 441
- Argument: Oral argument

Case history
- Prior: Cert. to the United States Court of Appeals for the Eleventh Circuit

Holding
- Portions of investigatory reports otherwise admissible under Federal Rule of Evidence 803(8)(C) are not inadmissible merely because they state a conclusion or opinion.

Court membership
- Chief Justice William Rehnquist Associate Justices William J. Brennan Jr. · Byron White; Thurgood Marshall · Harry Blackmun; John P. Stevens · Sandra Day O'Connor; Antonin Scalia · Anthony Kennedy

Case opinions
- Majority: Brennan, joined by White, Marshall, Blackmun, Stevens, Scalia, Kennedy; Rehnquist, O'Connor (parts I, II)
- Concur/dissent: Rehnquist, joined by O'Connor

Beech Aircraft Corporation v. Rainey, 488 U.S. 153 (1988), was a United States Supreme Court case that addressed a longstanding conflict among the Federal Courts of Appeals over whether Federal Rule of Evidence 803(8)(C), which provides an exception to the hearsay rule for public investigatory reports containing "factual findings," extends to conclusions and opinions contained in such reports. The court also considered whether the trial court abused its discretion in refusing to admit, on cross-examination, testimony intended to provide a more complete picture of a document about which the witness had testified on direct.

== Background ==
On July 13, 1982, U.S. Navy Lieutenant Commander Barbara Allen Rainey and her trainee Ensign Donald Bruce Knowlton were practicing touch-and-go landings at Middleton Field near Evergreen, Alabama, when the aircraft banked sharply, lost altitude, and crashed. Rainey and Knowlton were both killed in the crash. Because of the damage to the plane and the lack of any survivors, the cause of the accident could not be determined with certainty.

== Trial ==
The two pilots' surviving spouses, John Rainey and Rondi Knowlton, brought a product liability suit against petitioners Beech Aircraft Corporation, the plane's manufacturer, and Beech Aerospace Services, which serviced the plane under contract with the Navy. The plaintiffs alleged that the crash had been caused by a loss of engine power, known as "rollback," due to some defect in the aircraft's fuel control system. The defendants, on the other hand, advanced the theory of pilot error, suggesting that the plane had stalled during the abrupt avoidance maneuver. Following a 2-week trial, the jury returned a verdict for petitioners.

=== JAG Report ===
One piece of evidence presented by the defense was an investigative report prepared by Lieutenant Commander William Morgan on order of the training squadron's commanding officer and pursuant to authority granted in the Manual of the Judge Advocate General. This "JAG Report," completed during the six weeks following the accident, was organized into sections labeled "finding of fact," "opinions," and "recommendations," and was supported by some 60 attachments. The "finding of fact" included statements like the following:

13. At approximately 1020, while turning crosswind without proper interval, 3E955 crashed, immediately caught fire and burned.

.....

27. At the time of impact, the engine of 3E955 was operating but was operating at reduced power.

Among his "opinions" Lieutenant Commander Morgan stated that due to the deaths of the two pilots and the destruction of the aircraft "it is almost impossible to determine exactly what happened to Navy 3E955 from the time it left the runway on its last touch and go until it impacted the ground." He nonetheless continued with a detailed reconstruction of a possible set of events, based on pilot error, that could have caused the accident. The next two paragraphs stated a caveat and a conclusion:

6. Although the above sequence of events is the most likely to have occurred, it does not change the possibility that a 'rollback' did occur.

7. The most probable cause of the accident was the pilots [sic] failure to maintain proper interval.

The trial judge initially determined, at a pretrial conference, that the JAG Report was sufficiently trustworthy to be admissible, but due to Federal Rule of Evidence 803(8)(C) that it "would be admissible only on its factual findings and would not be admissible insofar as any opinions or conclusions are concerned." The day before trial, however, the court reversed itself and ruled, over the plaintiffs' objection, that some of the conclusions would be admitted.

=== Testimony of John Rainey ===
Five or six months after the accident, plaintiff John Rainey, husband of the deceased pilot and himself a Navy flight instructor, sent a detailed letter to Lieutenant Commander Morgan. Based on Rainey's own investigation, the letter took issue with some of the JAG Report's findings and outlined Rainey's theory that "[t]he most probable primary cause factor of this aircraft mishap is a loss of useful power (or rollback) caused by some form of pneumatic sensing/fuel flow malfunction, probably in the fuel control unit."

At trial Rainey did not testify during his side's case in chief, but he was called by the defense as an adverse witness. On direct examination he was asked about two statements contained in his letter. The first was to the effect that his wife had unsuccessfully attempted to cancel the ill-fated training flight because of a variety of adverse factors including her student's fatigue. The second question concerned a portion of Rainey's hypothesized scenario of the accident:

Didn't you say, sir, that after Mrs. Rainey's airplane rolled wings level, that Lieutenant Colonel Habermacher's plane came into view unexpectedly at its closest point of approach, although sufficient separation still existed between the aircraft. However, the unexpected proximitely [sic] of Colonel Habermacher's plane caused one of the aircrew in Mrs. Rainey's plane to react instinctively and abruptly by initiating a hard right turn away from Colonel Habermacher's airplane?

Rainey admitted having made both statements. On cross-examination, Rainey's counsel asked the following question: "In the same letter to which Mr. Toothman made reference to in his questions, sir, did you also say that the most probably [sic] primary cause of this mishap was rollback?" Before Rainey answered, the court sustained a defense objection on the ground that the question asked for Rainey's opinion. Further questioning along this line was cut off.

== Reversal ==
Rainey appealed the decision based on the violation of Federal Rules of Evidence 803(8)(C), for the inclusion of the JAG Report's factual findings, and 106, for denying Rainey the opportunity to clarify his letter. A panel of the Eleventh Circuit reversed and remanded for a new trial. Considering itself bound by the Fifth Circuit precedent of Smith v. Ithaca Corp., the panel agreed with Rainey's argument that Federal Rule of Evidence 803(8)(C), which excepts investigatory reports from the hearsay rule, did not encompass evaluative conclusions or opinions. Therefore, it held, the "conclusions" contained in the JAG Report should have been excluded. The panel also held, citing Federal Rule of Evidence 106, that it was reversible error for the trial court to have prohibited cross-examination about additional portions of Rainey's letter which would have put in context the admissions elicited from him on direct.

On rehearing en banc, the Court of Appeals divided evenly on the question of Rule 803(8)(C). It therefore held that Smith was controlling and consequently reinstated the panel judgment. On the Rule 106 question, the court unanimously reaffirmed the panel's decision that Rule 106 (or alternatively Rule 801(d)(1)(B)) required reversal. The petitioners then appealed to the Supreme Court.

== Opinion of the Court ==
The Court reversed the judgment of the Court of Appeals on the Rule 803(8)(C) issue. In the Court's holding, the Court stated: "We hold, therefore, that portions of investigatory reports otherwise admissible under Rule 803(8)(C) are not inadmissible merely because they state a conclusion or opinion. As long as the conclusion is based on a factual investigation and satisfies the Rule's trustworthiness requirement, it should be admissible along with other portions of the report." The Court also agreed with the Court of Appeals that the District Court erred, stating "We agree with the unanimous holding of the Court of Appeals en banc that the District Court erred in refusing to permit Rainey to present a more complete picture of what he had written to Morgan. We have no doubt that the jury was given a distorted and prejudicial impression of Rainey's letter."

== See also ==
- List of United States Supreme Court cases, volume 488
- List of United States Supreme Court cases
- Lists of United States Supreme Court cases by volume
- List of United States Supreme Court cases by the Rehnquist Court
