= Arizona v. Youngblood =

- Supreme Court of the United States

Argued October 11, 1988 Decided November 29, 1988
- Full case name: Arizona, Petitioner v. Larry Youngblood
- Citations: 488 U.S. 51 (more) 109 S. Ct. 333; 102 L. Ed. 2d 281; 1988 U.S. LEXIS 5404; 57 U.S.L.W. 4013

Case history
- Prior: Cert. to the Arizona Court of Appeals

Holding
- Unless a criminal defendant can show bad faith on the part of the police, failure to preserve potentially useful evidence does not constitute a denial of due process of law.

Court membership
- Chief Justice William Rehnquist Associate Justices William J. Brennan Jr. · Byron White; Thurgood Marshall · Harry Blackmun; John P. Stevens · Sandra Day O'Connor; Antonin Scalia · Anthony Kennedy

Case opinions
- Majority: Rehnquist, joined by White, O'Connor, Scalia, Kennedy
- Concurrence: Stevens
- Dissent: Blackmun, joined by Brennan, Marshall

Laws applied
- U.S. Const. amend. XIV

Arizona v. Youngblood, 488 U.S. 51 (1988), is a United States Supreme Court case concerning the limits of Constitutional due process in criminal law.

== Background ==
A boy was molested and sodomized. The rape kit was preserved in a refrigerator, but the boy's clothes (containing samples of the assailant's semen) were not preserved in a refrigeration unit. At a later date, criminalists were unable to do testing on the clothing because it had deteriorated as a result of not being refrigerated. The boy picked the defendant out of a photo lineup as his assailant.

Next, the case developed as follows:

At trial, expert witnesses testified that respondent might have been completely exonerated by timely performance of tests on properly preserved semen samples. Respondent was convicted of child molestation, sexual assault, and kidnapping in an Arizona state court. The Arizona Court of Appeals reversed the conviction on the ground that the State had breached a constitutional duty to preserve the semen samples from the victim's body and clothing.

— Arizona v. Youngblood, 488 U.S. 51, 51 (1988).

The defendant claimed that the state disposed of potentially exculpatory evidence by not properly preserving the evidence.

== Opinion of the Court ==
The Supreme Court held that there was no constitutional violation in this case. In the Court's holding, it stated: “[w]e therefore hold that unless a criminal defendant can show bad faith on the part of the police, failure to preserve potentially useful evidence does not constitute a denial of due process of law.” The Court relied on United States v. Marion, 404 U.S. 307 (1971), United States v. Lovasco, 431 U.S. 783 (1977), and other cases for its reasoning.

== Subsequent developments ==
On remand to the Arizona Court of Appeals, the court again reversed on state law grounds.

In 2000, on request from Youngblood's attorneys, the police department tested the degraded evidence using new, sophisticated DNA technology. Those results exonerated Youngblood, and he was released from prison in August 2000, and charges were dismissed.

Shortly thereafter, the DNA profile from the evidence was entered into the national convicted offender databases. In early 2001, officials got a hit, matching the profile of Walter Cruise, who was then serving time in Texas on unrelated charges. In August 2002, Cruise was convicted of the crime and sentenced to twenty-four years in prison.

== See also ==
- Miranda v. Arizona (1966)
- Due Process Clause
- List of United States Supreme Court cases, volume 488
- List of United States Supreme Court cases
- Lists of United States Supreme Court cases by volume
- List of United States Supreme Court cases by the Rehnquist Court
