= People v. Freeman =

Criminal case in California (1987–1988)

- Supreme Court of California

Argued December 10, 1987 Decided August 25, 1988
- Full case name: The People v. Harold Freeman
- Citation(s): 46 Cal. 3d 419; 758 P.2d 1128; 250 Cal. Rptr. 598; 1988 Cal. LEXIS 171; 15 Media L. Rep. 2072

Case history
- Prior history: Defendant convicted, Superior Court, Los Angeles County; conviction affirmed, 233 Cal. Rptr. 510 (Cal. Ct. App. 1987); sentence affirmed, 234 Cal. Rptr. 245 (Cal. Ct. App. 1987); review granted, 734 P.2d 562 (Ca. 1987)
- Subsequent history: California v. Freeman: Stay denied, 488 U.S. 1311 (1989) (O'Connor, J., in chambers); cert. denied, 489 U.S. 1017 (1989)

Holding
- California pandering statute was not intended to cover the hiring of actors who would be engaging in sexually explicit but non-obscene performances. Convictions could only be upheld if the payment to the actors was for the purpose of sexually gratifying the payer or the actors.

Court membership
- Chief Justice: Malcolm Lucas
- Associate Justices: Stanley Mosk, Anthony Kline, Allen Broussard, Edward Panelli, John Arguelles, David Eagleson, Marcus Kaufman

Case opinions
- Majority: Kaufman, joined by Mosk, Broussard, Panelli, Kline
- Concurrence: Lucas, Eagleson

Laws applied
- U.S. Const. amend. I; Cal. Penal Code §§ 266I, 647

People v. Freeman was a criminal prosecution of Harold Freeman, a producer and director of pornographic films, by the U.S. state of California. Freeman was charged in 1987 with pandering—procurement of persons "for the purpose of prostitution"—under section 266i of the Cal. Penal Code for hiring adult actors, which the prosecution characterized as pimping. The prosecution was part of an attempt by California to shut down the pornographic film industry. The prosecution's characterization was ultimately rejected on appeal by the California Supreme Court, effectively legalizing pornographic film production in the state of California. Prior to this decision, pornographic films were of ambiguous legality and were often filmed in secret locations.

Freeman was initially convicted, and lost on appeal to the California Court of Appeal. The trial judge, however, thought jail would be an unreasonably harsh penalty for Freeman's conduct, and sentenced him to probation, despite the fact that this was explicitly contrary to the statute. The State appealed this sentence but lost.

Freeman appealed to the California Supreme Court, which subsequently overturned his conviction, finding that the California pandering statute was not intended to cover the hiring of actors who would be engaging in sexually explicit but non-obscene performances. Freeman could only have been lawfully convicted of pandering if he had paid the actors for the purpose of sexually gratifying himself or the actors. The court relied upon the language of the statute for this interpretation, as well as the need to avoid a conflict with the First Amendment right to free speech. The court viewed Freeman's conviction as "a somewhat transparent attempt at an 'end run' around the First Amendment and the state obscenity laws."

The State of California unsuccessfully tried to have this judgment overturned by the United States Supreme Court. Justice Sandra Day O'Connor denied a stay of the California Supreme Court's judgment. While being critical of its First Amendment reasoning, noting "it must certainly be true that otherwise illegal conduct is not made legal by being filmed", she found it unlikely the petition for certiorari would be granted because the California Supreme Court's ruling was founded on an adequate and independent basis of state law. The full Court subsequently denied the petition for certiorari.

As a result, the making of hardcore pornography was effectively legalized in California.

In 2008, in the case of New Hampshire v. Theriault, the New Hampshire Supreme Court adopted the distinction between pornography production and prostitution in their interpretation of The New Hampshire Constitutions' free speech clause.

== See also ==
- List of United States Supreme Court cases, volume 488
- List of United States Supreme Court cases
- Lists of United States Supreme Court cases by volume
- List of United States Supreme Court cases by the Rehnquist Court
