= Micky Colton =

Major Micky Colton (Ret.) is a retired female Canadian military pilot, FEEL facilitator and author. She joined the military in August 1980, just a few weeks after the Canadian military first started accepting female civilian recruits in their pilot program. Having received her pilot's wings in 1982, she spent most of her time in the military as a Search And Rescue (SAR) Pilot, operating the CC130 Hercules aircraft. In 2000, she became the first female pilot to log 5000 hours on the Hercules, and in 2009 was honoured by being added to the 100 names to commemorate 100 years of flight in Canada gracing the side of a CF18 demonstration hornet. She retired from the military in 2011, was a reservist until 2018 coordinating SAR launches for 424 Squadron, and is now no longer serving.

== Early years ==
Major Colton was born in Kitchener, Ontario in May 1958. As a child and teenager, she had no interest in the military and had aspirations of becoming a veterinarian. However, she developed a love of flying after cashing in coupons for free flying lessons clipped from a magazine. "My boyfriend at the time said, ‘You can’t fly, you’re a girl,’ and I thought, ‘Oh yeah? ’" (Major Colton on the topic of her free lessons). At the time, she had been working as a courier, but got the idea to join the military from a friend. She saw no reason why she would not be allowed to enter the military, and was surprised when the recruitment officer told her excitedly that she was his first ever female pilot recruit.

== Working years ==
Major Colton moved through the officer ranks of the Canadian military, and was promoted to major in 1997. Over the years she has been posted to several Canadian military bases including St. Albert, Alberta where her daughter was born; Winnipeg, Manitoba; Greenwood, Nova Scotia and others. Her final posting was to 8 Wing Trenton in Trenton, Ontario, in 1992 where she remained until retirement. She has spent the majority of her years in the military flying the Hercules in SAR missions, searching middle- and Eastern-Ontario for missing persons, boats, or aircraft. In 2003, she spent 6 months in Eindhoven, the Netherlands, working with Canadian troops deploying in and out of Afghanistan. Through her time in the military, she has been a role model for other women in the air or other armed forces, and has been a part of the Air Force Speakers Bureau, speaking to high schools and women's clubs about her experiences, since 2008.

== Notable accomplishments ==
1980: Joins the third group of Canadian female military pilots-in-training in Canadian history.
1997: Promoted to major.
2000: Becomes the first Canadian Woman to log 5000 hours in the CC130 Hercules.
2006: Logs 6000 hours on the Hercules and has log book signed by Prime Minister Stephen Harper who she was flying to Nunavut when she reached 6000.
2009: Is named as one of the 100 Canadians who have made significant contributions to Canada's aviation history to be painted on the side of the 100 Years Of Flight commemorative CF-18 Hornet.
2011: Retires from the airforce after 32 years of service, 6,936 hours on the CC130 and over 7,100 flying hours total.
2018: Retires from the reserves.
2018: Wins the Northern Lights Aero Foundation (NLAF) Elsie Pioneer Award
2021: Publishes her first book, Riley and the Road Cones.

== Personal life ==
Major Colton is a wife and mother, married to Lt. Colonel (ret.) Chris Colton. She met Chris in 1982 as he was her first flying instructor when she first started pilot training. They married in 1989, and had their first and only child, a daughter, in 1990.
Colton is the owner of Horse Sense Equine Guidance, a FEEL (Facilitated Equine Experiential Learning) facility in Prince Edward County, Ontario.
Colton is an active dressage rider, and rides and trains her bay International Sport Horse, Han Solo, in Silver (provincial) level dressage.
In 2021, Colton became a children's author, launching her first in a series of books about the horses at her farm
