= Florida v. Riley =

- Supreme Court of the United States

Argued October 3, 1988 Decided January 23, 1989
- Full case name: Florida v. Riley
- Citations: 488 U.S. 445 (more) 109 S. Ct. 693; 102 L. Ed. 2d 835; 1989 U.S. LEXIS 580; 57 U.S.L.W. 4126

Case history
- Prior: Defendant's motion to suppress evidence granted by trial court; reversed, State v. Riley, 476 So. 2d 1354 (Fla. Dist. Ct. App. 1985); decision quashed, 511 So. 2d 282 (Fla. 1987); cert. granted, 484 U.S. 1058 (1988).
- Subsequent: Rehearing denied, 490 U.S. 1014 (1989); remanded, 549 So. 2d 673 (Fla. 1989).

Holding
- Helicopter surveillance at an altitude of 400 feet did not constitute a search under the Fourth Amendment. Florida Supreme Court reversed.

Court membership
- Chief Justice William Rehnquist Associate Justices William J. Brennan Jr. · Byron White; Thurgood Marshall · Harry Blackmun; John P. Stevens · Sandra Day O'Connor; Antonin Scalia · Anthony Kennedy

Case opinions
- Plurality: White, joined by Rehnquist, Scalia, Kennedy
- Concurrence: O'Connor (in judgment)
- Dissent: Brennan, joined by Marshall, Stevens
- Dissent: Blackmun

Laws applied
- U.S. Const. amend. IV

Florida v. Riley, 488 U.S. 445 (1989), was a United States Supreme Court decision which held that police officials do not need a warrant to observe an individual's property from public airspace.

== Background ==
The Pasco County Sheriff's Office received a tip that Michael Riley was growing marijuana on his 5 acres (20,000 m^{2}) of rural property. A deputy sheriff subsequently investigated the tip and went to Riley's mobile home. Unable to see inside a greenhouse, which was behind the defendant's mobile home, the deputy circled over the property using a helicopter. The absence of two roof panels allowed the deputy to see, with his naked eye, what appeared to be marijuana growing. A warrant was obtained and marijuana was found inside the greenhouse.

=== Procedural history ===
Riley successfully argued before the trial court that the aerial search violated his reasonable expectation of privacy and Fourth Amendment rights. The Florida Second District Court of Appeal disagreed, siding instead with the state, but the Florida Supreme Court agreed with Riley and overturned the Court of Appeal.

== Supreme Court ==
=== Issue(s) before the Court ===
- "Whether surveillance of the interior of a partially covered greenhouse in a residential backyard from the vantage point of a helicopter located 400 feet (120 m) above the greenhouse constitutes a 'search' for which a warrant is required under the Fourth Amendment and Article I, 12 of the Florida Constitution." — Justice White, quoting the Florida Supreme Court decision

=== Decision and rationale ===
The US Supreme Court reversed the decision of the Florida Supreme Court with a four-vote plurality, arguing that the accused did not have a reasonable expectation that the greenhouse was protected from aerial view, and thus that the helicopter surveillance did not constitute a search under the Fourth Amendment. However, the Court stopped short of allowing all aerial inspections of private property, noting that it was "of obvious importance" that a private citizen could have legally flown in the same airspace:

Any member of the public could legally have been flying over Riley's property in a helicopter at the altitude of 400 feet and could have observed Riley's greenhouse. The police officer did no more.

Also vital to the Court's ruling was that the helicopter did not interfere with the normal use of the property:

As far as this record reveals, no intimate details connected with the use of the home or curtilage were observed, and there was no undue noise, no wind, no dust, or threat of injury. In these circumstances, there was no violation of the Fourth Amendment.

=== Justice O'Connor's concurrence ===
Justice O'Connor felt that the plurality focused too much upon FAA regulations, "whose purpose is to promote air safety, not to protect [Fourth Amendment rights]." She deviated from the plurality opinion in arguing that the frequency of public flight in the airspace was a necessary concern, and that the mere legality of such flights was insufficient to determine whether the defendant had a reasonable expectation of privacy:

[I]t is not conclusive to observe, as the plurality does, that "[a]ny member of the public could legally have been flying over Riley's property in a helicopter at the altitude of 400 feet and could have observed Riley's greenhouse." Nor is it conclusive that police helicopters may often fly at 400 feet. If the public rarely, if ever, travels overhead at such altitudes, the observation cannot be said to be from a vantage point generally used by the public and Riley cannot be said to have "knowingly expose[d]" his greenhouse to public view.

Nevertheless, O'Connor concurred with the plurality opinion because she thought the defendant still needed to show that public use of the relevant airspace was uncommon. The Justice closed by saying flights less than 400 feet (120 m) in altitude "may be sufficiently rare that police surveillance from such altitudes would violate reasonable expectations of privacy."

=== Justice Brennan's dissent ===
Justice Brennan, joined by Marshall and Stevens, strongly believed that the plurality had misstated the issue, agreeing with O'Connor that the frequency of public air travel was a necessary consideration, and that the key issue in the case was whether ordinary citizens were normally in the air above the defendant's home:

The police officer positioned 400 feet above Riley's backyard was not, however, standing on a public road. The vantage point he enjoyed was not one any citizen could readily share. His ability to see over Riley’s fence depended on his use of a very expensive and sophisticated piece of machinery to which few ordinary citizens have access.

However, Brennan disagreed with O'Connor in that he believed the defendant did not necessarily need to show that public flight was rare, but rather that the state needed to show that it was common:

Because the State has greater access to information concerning customary flight patterns and because the coercive power of the State ought not be brought to bear in cases in which it is unclear whether the prosecution is a product of an unconstitutional, warrantless search, the burden of proof properly rests with the State and not with the individual defendant. The State quite clearly has not carried this burden.

=== Justice Blackmun's dissent ===
Justice Blackmun recognized that five of the nine justices (O'Connor and the four dissenters) had agreed that "the reasonableness of Riley's expectation [of privacy] depends, in large measure, on the frequency of non-police helicopter flights at an altitude of 450 feet." Like Brennan, Blackmun noticed that the main disagreement among these five justices was whether the government or the defendant had the burden of proof in establishing whether public flights above Riley's home were common or rare. Blackmun thought it was likely that such flights were quite rare, supporting Riley's case, so the government had to show they occurred with some regularity. He wrote that "burdens of proof relevant to Fourth Amendment issues may be based on a judicial estimate of the probabilities involved."

== See also ==
- List of United States Supreme Court cases, volume 488
- List of United States Supreme Court cases
- Lists of United States Supreme Court cases by volume
- List of United States Supreme Court cases by the Rehnquist Court
- Katz v. United States, 389 U.S. 347 (1967)
- California v. Ciraolo, 476 U.S. 207 (1986)
- California v. Greenwood, 486 U.S. 35 (1988)
- Kyllo v. United States, 533 U.S. 27 (2001)
- Dow Chemical Co. v. United States, 476 U.S. 227 (1986)
- Open-fields doctrine
- Curtilage
