= Minnesota v. Dickerson =

- Supreme Court of the United States

Argued March 3, 1993 Decided June 7, 1993
- Full case name: Minnesota v. Dickerson
- Citations: 508 U.S. 366 (more) 113 S. Ct. 2130; 124 L. Ed. 2d 334; 1993 U.S. LEXIS 4018

Case history
- Prior: State v. Dickerson, 469 N.W.2d 462 (Minn. Ct. App. 1991); affirmed, 481 N.W.2d 840 (Minn. 1992); cert. granted, 506 U.S. 814 (1992).

Holding
- The Fourth Amendment permits the seizure of contraband detected through a police officer's sense of touch during a protective patdown search.

Court membership
- Chief Justice William Rehnquist Associate Justices Byron White · Harry Blackmun; John P. Stevens · Sandra Day O'Connor; Antonin Scalia · Anthony Kennedy; David Souter · Clarence Thomas

Case opinions
- Majority: White, joined by unanimous (Parts I and II); Stevens, O'Connor, Scalia, Kennedy, Souter (Parts III and IV)
- Concurrence: Scalia
- Concur/dissent: Rehnquist, joined by Blackmun, Thomas

Laws applied
- U.S. Const. Amend. IV

Minnesota v. Dickerson, 508 U.S. 366 (1993), was a decision by the Supreme Court of the United States. The Court unanimously held that, when a police officer who is conducting a lawful patdown search for weapons feels something that plainly is contraband, the object may be seized even though it is not a weapon. By a 6-to-3 vote, however, the court held that the officer in this case had gone beyond the limits of a lawful patdown search before he could determine the object was contraband, making the search and the subsequent seizure unlawful under the Fourth Amendment.

Associate Justice Byron White gave the opinion of the court.

== Background ==
The defendant, Timothy Dickerson, was in a known drug area. An officer investigated by ordering a patdown of Dickerson to search for any weapons. During that search, he felt a small lump in his coat. Without further evidence, he reached in and grabbed the lump and found it was cocaine. In lower court, Dickerson moved that the cocaine be suppressed as evidence because the officer violated his right against unreasonable search and seizure under the Fourth Amendment to the United States Constitution, but the trial court overruled this objection, ruling that the frisking and the seizure of the cocaine were justified.

=== Procedural history ===
The Minnesota Court of Appeals reversed the trial court's ruling. The state Supreme Court held that both the stop and the frisk of respondent were valid under Terry v. Ohio, but found the seizure of the cocaine to be unconstitutional. Refusing to enlarge the "plain-view" exception to the Fourth Amendment's warrant requirement, the court appeared to adopt a categorical rule barring the seizure of any contraband detected by an officer through the sense of touch during a patdown search. The court further noted that, even if it recognized such a "plain-feel" exception, the search in this case would not qualify because it went far beyond what is permissible under Terry.

== Supreme Court ==
The U.S. Supreme Court unanimously agreed that the cocaine in this case was inadmissible as evidence even though the Court held that officers were allowed to assume that an object was contraband through touch.

If a police officer lawfully pats down a suspect's outer clothing and feels an object whose contour or mass makes its identity immediately apparent, there has been no invasion of the suspect's privacy beyond that already authorized by the officer's search for weapons; if the object is contraband, its warrantless seizure would be justified by the same practical considerations that inhere in the plain-view context.
