= Arizona v. Hicks =

- Supreme Court of the United States

Argued December 8, 1986 Decided March 3, 1987
- Full case name: State of Arizona v. James Thomas Hicks
- Citations: 480 U.S. 321 (more) 107 S. Ct. 1149; 94 L. Ed. 2d 347

Case history
- Prior: Trial court granted defendant motion to suppress; affirmed by the Arizona Court of Appeals, 707 P.2d 331 (Ariz. Ct. App. 1985); review denied by Arizona Supreme Court; certiorari granted, 475 U.S. 1107 (1986).

Holding
- Police require probable cause to seize items in plain view.

Court membership
- Chief Justice William Rehnquist Associate Justices William J. Brennan Jr. · Byron White; Thurgood Marshall · Harry Blackmun; Lewis F. Powell Jr. · John P. Stevens; Sandra Day O'Connor · Antonin Scalia

Case opinions
- Majority: Scalia, joined by Brennan, White, Marshall, Blackmun, Stevens
- Concurrence: White
- Dissent: Powell, joined by Rehnquist, O'Connor
- Dissent: O'Connor, joined by Rehnquist, Powell

Laws applied
- U.S. Const. amend. IV

Arizona v. Hicks, 480 U.S. 321 (1987), is a decision by the Supreme Court of the United States in which the Court held that the Fourth Amendment to the U.S. Constitution requires the police to have probable cause before they can seize items in plain view.

== Facts ==
On April 18, 1984, a bullet was fired through the floor of James Thomas Hicks' apartment, striking and injuring a man in the apartment below. The police arrived and entered Hicks' apartment to search for the shooter, for other victims, and for weapons. While in Hicks's apartment, one of the officers noticed two sets of expensive-looking stereo equipment, "which seemed out of place in the squalid and otherwise ill-appointed four-room apartment." The officer moved the equipment to record the serial numbers, suspecting that the equipment was stolen, and then reported the serial numbers to police headquarters. The officer was informed that the equipment had been taken in an armed robbery, for which Hicks was later indicted.

The state trial court granted Hicks' motion to suppress the stereo equipment, and the Arizona Court of Appeals affirmed. It was conceded that the police's initial entry into Hicks' apartment was lawful, although it took place without a warrant, because of the emergency created by the shooting. But moving the stereo equipment was an additional search, the appellate court reasoned, which lacked a warrant and was unrelated to the purpose the police were in Hicks' apartment to begin with. The appellate court therefore found that the police's actions violated the Fourth Amendment, and affirmed the trial court's granting of the motion to suppress. The Arizona Supreme Court declined the State's request to review the case, but the U.S. Supreme Court agreed to do so.

== Majority opinion ==
The Fourth Amendment guards against unreasonable "searches" and "seizures." The Court first ruled that when the police officer moved the stereo equipment to record the serial numbers, he conducted a Fourth Amendment "search," unrelated to the initial reason the police were in Hicks's apartment, to search for weapons and the person who fired the bullet through the floor of the apartment.

The Court rejected the "apparent position of the Arizona Court of Appeals that because the officers' action directed to the stereo equipment was unrelated to the justification for their entry into [Hicks's] apartment, it was per se unreasonable." The state was attempting to justify the search under the plain view exception to the warrant requirement. In such cases, the search is by definition unrelated to the initial purpose the police are in the position to view the purported contraband or evidence of criminal activity. The purpose of the plain-view exception to the warrant requirement is rather to spare the police who discover weapons or contraband during the course of an otherwise lawful search the trouble of having to obtain a warrant to seize those weapons or contraband. Warrants are issued only upon a showing of probable cause; thus, probable cause to believe an item in plain view is contraband or evidence of criminal activity must be required to allow the plain-view exception.

There are, of course, other situations in which the police may lawfully seize an object upon less than probable cause, but the state justified the search of the stereo equipment in this case solely on the fact that they were in plain view of the officers who were otherwise lawfully present in Hicks's apartment, and happenstance cannot by itself supplant the requirement of probable cause.

== Dissenting opinions ==
Justice O'Connor disagreed with the majority's characterization of the police actions regarding the stereo equipment as a full-blown search. Rather, she called it a "cursory inspection," and argued that the police could conduct such a cursory inspection on reasonable suspicion that an object is contraband or evidence of criminal activity. A "distinction between searches based on their relative intrusiveness — and its subsequent adoption by a consensus of American courts — is entirely consistent with our Fourth Amendment jurisprudence." In other cases, she argued, the Court had allowed minimally invasive searches under the Fourth Amendment in the face of strong governmental interests. The government had such an interest in this case, because of the "prevalence of mass-produced goods in our national economy" whose only distinguishing characteristic was a serial number.

Justice Powell wondered what the police should have done in the situation they faced. The officer's experience told him the stereo equipment was probably stolen, but lacking probable cause, he could not have obtained a warrant to seize it, and he could not have remained in Hicks's apartment to prevent Hicks from removing the stereo equipment after the other officers finished searching. In the face of the dilemma, Justice Powell worried that the bright-line rule making moving the equipment a "search" requiring probable cause "could deter conscientious police officers from lawfully obtaining evidence necessary to convict guilty persons."

== See also ==
- List of United States Supreme Court cases, volume 480
- List of United States Supreme Court cases
- Lists of United States Supreme Court cases by volume
- List of United States Supreme Court cases by the Rehnquist Court
