= Barbara Allen Rainey =

United States Navy officer (1945–1982)

Barbara Ann Allen (Rainey)
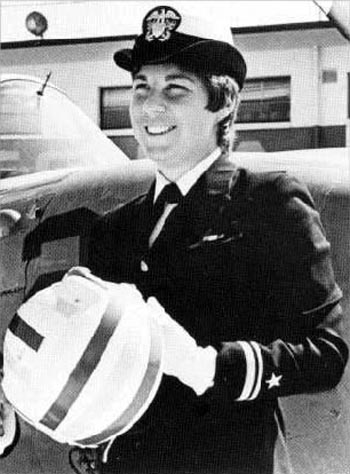
- Rainey as a Lt. Junior Grade
- Born: August 20, 1948; Bethesda, Maryland, US
- Died: July 13, 1982 (aged 33); Evergreen, Alabama, US
- Burial place: Arlington National Cemetery
- Military career
- Allegiance: United States
- Branch: United States Navy
- Service years: 1973–1982
- Rank: Lieutenant commander

Barbara Ann Allen Rainey (August 20, 1948 – July 13, 1982) was one of the first six female pilots in the U.S. armed forces. Rainey received her wings of gold as the first female to be designated a naval aviator in February 1974 and became the first Navy woman to qualify as a jet pilot. She attained the rank of Lieutenant Commander in the United States Navy. She was killed in an aircraft crash in 1982 while performing her duties as a flight instructor.

== Early life and career ==
Allen was born at Bethesda Naval Hospital in Bethesda, Maryland, and was the daughter of a career Naval Officer. She graduated from Lakewood High School in California, where she was an outstanding athlete and a member of the National Honor Society. Consistently on the dean's list at Long Beach City College, California, she later transferred to and graduated from Whittier College in California where she became a member of the Thalian Society. She was commissioned in the United States Navy Reserve in ceremonies at U.S Navy Officer Candidate School in Newport, Rhode Island in December 1970, and was assigned to the Naval Amphibious Base Little Creek, Virginia. She later served on the staff of the Supreme Allied Command, Atlantic in Norfolk, Virginia.

== First female naval aviator ==
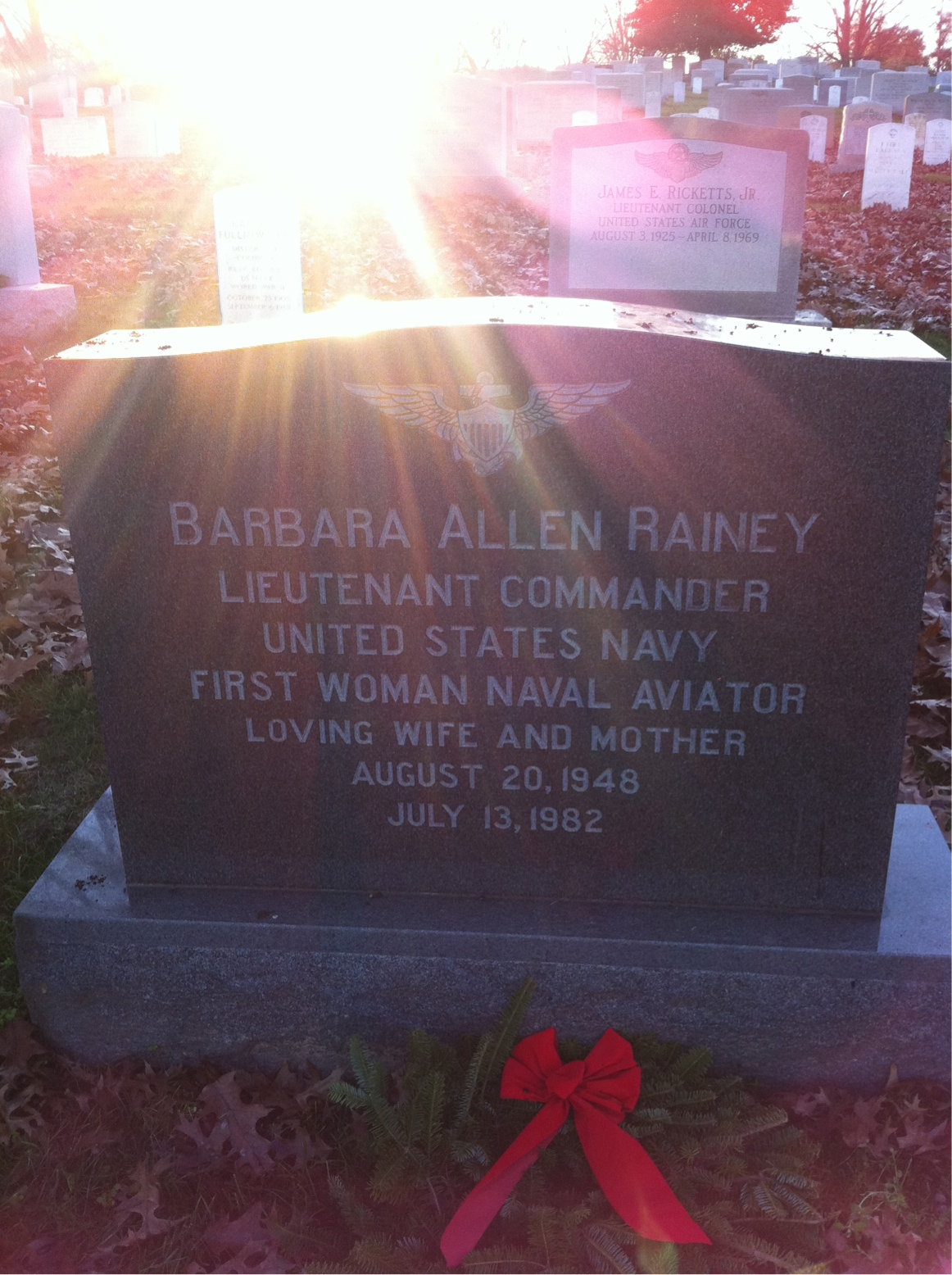
Grave at Arlington National Cemetery

In early 1973, the Secretary of the Navy John W. Warner announced a test program to train female Naval Aviators. Seeking a greater challenge and wanting to follow in the footsteps of her U.S. Marine Corps aviator brother, Bill, Allen applied to the program and was accepted into the U.S. Naval Flight Training School.

Allen and seven other women reported for flight training on March 2, 1973, at Naval Air Station Pensacola, Florida. She was the first of her class to earn her Wings of Gold and was designated the first female naval aviator in history in ceremonies at Naval Air Station Corpus Christi, Texas, on February 22, 1974. She was assigned to fly C-1s in Alameda, California with a transport squadron and became the first jet qualified woman in the U.S. Navy flying the T-39.

Allen married John C. Rainey, whom she had met during her flight training. While pregnant with her first daughter, she transferred to the Naval Reserve in November 1977. She remained active in the Naval Reserves and, while pregnant with her second daughter, qualified to fly the R6D (DC-6).

In 1981, with the Navy experiencing a shortage of flight instructors, she was accepted for recall to active duty as a flight instructor and was assigned to Training Squadron Three (VT-3) based at Naval Air Station Whiting Field flying the T-34C Mentor. On July 13, 1982, Allen, along with trainee, Ensign Donald Bruce Knowlton, was practicing touch-and-go landings at Middleton Field near Evergreen, Conecuh County, Alabama when the aircraft banked sharply, lost altitude, and crashed. Allen and Knowlton were both killed in the crash.

Uncertainty over the cause of the crash led the pilots' surviving spouses to file a product liability suit against Beech Aircraft Corporation, portions of which would eventually be heard by the United States Supreme Court in Beech Aircraft Corp. v. Rainey.

== See also ==
- Naval Aviation
- Patricia Denkler, first USN woman aviator to carrier qualify in a jet aircraft
