= Plain view doctrine =

Legal doctrine for police searches in the United States

In the United States, the plain view doctrine is an exception to the Fourth Amendment's warrant requirement that allows an officer to seize evidence and contraband that are found in plain view during a lawful observation. The doctrine is also regularly used by Transportation Security Administration officers while screening people and property at American airports.

For the plain view doctrine to apply for discoveries, the three-prong Horton test requires that:

1. The officer is lawfully present at the place where the evidence can be plainly viewed
2. The officer has a lawful right of access to the object
3. The incriminating character of the object is immediately apparent

== Development ==
The plain view doctrine was first articulated in the Supreme Court case of Coolidge v. New Hampshire. The original formulation included three factors. First, the officer must be lawfully present when viewing the evidence or contraband. Second, the officer must immediately (without further search) have probable cause to believe that the item is either contraband or evidence of a crime. Third, the observation must have been "inadvertent," not anticipated or intended by the officer before the sighting.

In Horton v. California, the court eliminated the requirement that the discovery of evidence in plain view be inadvertent, which had caused ambiguity. The case involved the plain view seizure of weapons related to a robbery, even though the warrant was signed by a judge who had specifically denied permission to seize weapons as part of the search. The Horton ruling also clarified that the officer must have a "lawful right of access" to the objects to seize them under the plain view doctrine. For example, an officer who sees contraband in plain view in someone's home through the window but is not authorized to enter the home cannot rely on the plain view doctrine to enter the home and seize the contraband.

== Limitations ==
For a law-enforcement officer to legally seize an item, the officer must have probable cause to believe that the item is evidence of a crime or is contraband. The police may not move objects in order to obtain a better view, and the officer may not be in a location unlawfully. These limitations were detailed in the case of Arizona v. Hicks, 480 U.S. 321 (1987).

The plain view doctrine only eliminates the warrant requirement, not the probable cause requirement. Investigators must normally obtain a court-issued warrant before seizing property, by presenting enough evidence to a magistrate judge to meet the probable cause requirement. When using the plain view doctrine, investigators must possess the evidence needed to meet the probable cause requirement, as they are only exempt from the step of obtaining a warrant from a judge.

The doctrine only authorizes the seizure of contraband or evidence; it does not authorize a further search or additional investigation. Therefore, if investigators do not have enough evidence to meet the probable cause requirement, they may not even conduct a relatively nonintrusive search to establish probable cause. The requirement is that the incriminating character of the object must be immediately apparent. In Arizona v. Hicks, police officers were in an apartment investigating a shooting and suspected that a record player in the apartment was stolen. The officers could not see the serial number, which was on the bottom of the record player, so they lifted the player and confirmed that its serial number matched that of one that had been reported stolen. However, the Supreme Court ruled that lifting the record player constituted an additional search (although a relatively nonintrusive one) because the serial number was not in plain view. This meant that the plain view doctrine did not apply, and the officers needed a warrant. The evidence of the stolen record player could not be used against the defendant because of the exclusionary rule, which is the remedy available when evidence is obtained in violation of the Fourth Amendment.

The officer must be lawfully present where he or she sees the item. For example, an officer may not enter a suspect's home without a warrant and rely on the plain view doctrine. However, if an officer is inside a suspect's home under an unrelated warrant, he or she may rely on the plain view doctrine, subject to the doctrine's other requirements. In Arizona v. Hicks, the police officers were in the apartment under another exception to the warrant requirement, exigent circumstances. This qualified as a lawful entry, and the plain view doctrine applied to items that the officers could see in the apartment and readily identify as contraband or evidence without further search.

== Subdoctrines ==
The plain view doctrine has also been expanded to include the subdoctrines of plain feel, plain smell and plain hearing. These doctrines are also limited to seizing an item when its nature as contraband or evidence of a crime is "immediately apparent." In Minnesota v. Dickerson, a police officer felt a lump in a suspect's pocket during a lawful frisk search. He did not immediately have probable cause to believe that it was contraband, but he proceeded to inspect it further by squeezing it, and then had probable cause to believe that it was a piece of crack cocaine. The Supreme Court held that this additional inspection was not covered by the plain view doctrine, and as such, the contraband could not be used against the defendant. However, the court's reasoning extended the plain view doctrine to other senses, such as the sense of touch.

== Application to technology ==
In the case of United States v. Wong, police were searching the defendant's computer for evidence related to a murder when they discovered images of child pornography on the computer. Although the warrant was specific to evidence of the murder, the Ninth Circuit held that the plain view exception allowed them to seize the child pornography, as searching graphics files was valid under the warrant and the files were immediately identifiable as contraband.

However, as with the application of this doctrine elsewhere, the plain view doctrine only justifies a seizure of evidence or contraband that is in plain view, and it does not justify a further search. In United States v. Carey, a detective was searching a computer for evidence of drug trafficking. When he opened an image file that depicted child pornography, he proceeded to search for more images and found a total of 244 images of child pornography on the computer. The Tenth Circuit held that only the first image was covered by the plain view doctrine, and the rest of the images could not be used against the defendant in court.

== See also ==
- Aerial surveillance doctrine
- Exigent circumstances
- Open-fields doctrine
- Consent search
- Arizona v. Gant (2009)
