= Curtilage =

Enclosed area surrounding a house

In common law, the curtilage of a house or dwelling is the land immediately surrounding it, including any closely associated buildings and structures, but excluding any associated "open fields beyond". In feudal times every castle with its dependent buildings was protected by a surrounding wall, and all the land within the wall was termed the curtilage. The term excludes any closely associated buildings, structures, or divisions that contain the separate intimate activities of their own respective occupants, with those occupying residents being persons other than those residents of the house or dwelling of which the building is associated.

In some legal jurisdictions, the curtilage of a dwelling forms an exterior boundary, within which a home owner can have a reasonable expectation of privacy and where "intimate home activities" take place. It is a basic legal concept underlying the concepts of search and seizure, conveyancing of real property, burglary, trespass, self-defense, and land use planning.

In urban properties, the location of the curtilage may be self-evident from the position of fences or walls. For larger, more rural properties, it may be a matter of debate as to where the private area ends and the "open fields" start.

== Etymology ==
The word derives from Middle English: courtelage; Old French: cortillage or cortil (" little court"); cort (court) + -il (diminutive suffix) + -age.

== In United States law ==
=== Common law ===
At common law, which derives from English law, curtilage has been defined as "the open space situated within a common enclosure belonging to a dwelling-house". Black's Law Dictionary of 1891 defined it as:

The enclosed space of ground and buildings immediately surrounding a dwelling-house. In its most comprehensive and proper legal signification, it includes all that space of ground and buildings thereon which is usually enclosed within the general fence immediately surrounding a principal messuage and outbuildings, and yard closely adjoining to a dwelling-house, but it may be large enough for cattle to be levant and couchant therein.

— Black's Law Dictionary

Where American homes are generally less likely than their English counterparts to include fenced or walled enclosures, the courts have not strictly held to such a requirement. In practice, determining the boundaries of curtilage has proven to be imprecise and subject to controversy.

=== Fourth Amendment ===
==== General definition ====
The U.S. Supreme Court has held that for the purposes of the Fourth Amendment, an area immediately surrounding a house or dwelling is curtilage if it harbors the "intimate activity associated with the 'sanctity of a man's home and the privacies of life'".

In United States v. Dunn (1987), the Court provided guidance, saying that, "curtilage questions should be resolved with particular reference to four factors: the proximity of the area claimed to be curtilage to the home, whether the area is included within an enclosure surrounding the home, the nature of the uses to which the area is put, and the steps taken by the resident to protect the area from observation by people passing by."

In Florida v. Jardines (2013), the Court held, in a 5–4 decision by Justice Antonin Scalia, that the curtilage is protected from police dogs sniffing for marijuana:

We therefore regard the area "immediately surrounding and associated with the home"—what our cases call the curtilage—as "part of the home itself for Fourth Amendment purposes." ... That principle has ancient and durable roots. Just as the distinction between the home and the open fields is "as old as the common law," ... so too is the identity of home and what Blackstone called the "curtilage or homestall," for the "house protects and privileges all its branches and appurtenants." ... This area around the home is "intimately linked to the home, both physically and psychologically," and is where "privacy expectations are most heightened."

— Florida v. Jardines (2013), citations placed in the endnote

In Caniglia v. Strom (2021), the Court noted only a "few permissible invasions of the home and its curtilage. Perhaps most familiar, for example, are searches and seizures pursuant to a valid warrant." The court rejected the standalone doctrine that police "caretaking" duties justify warrantless searches and seizures in the home and its curtilage.

===== First factor: distance =====
In Dunn, the Court said that the location of a barn, being 60 yards (55 m) from the home and 50 yards (46 m) outside of the fence which completely encircled the home, suggested that it was outside the home's curtilage.

In Jardines, the Court found that a porch right in front of a private house is part of the curtilage.

===== Second factor: enclosure by fence =====
In Dunn, the Court said that although the area was surrounded by a fence, the home was surrounded by a different fence and that fence was obviously intended to demark a specific area of land immediately adjacent to the house that is readily identifiable as part and parcel of the house.

===== Third factor: nature of use =====
In Dunn, the Court said that law enforcement officials had evidence that the area was not being used for intimate activities of the home, namely that it was being used to store large amounts of phenylacetic acid (used in the illegal manufacture of drugs) and that it had a very, very strong smell.

In Jardines, the Court specifically named a front porch as a prime example of curtilage; even though Girl Scouts or salespersons can knock on the front door, they must leave immediately if there is no answer.

===== Fourth factor: protection from observation =====
In Dunn, the Court said the area was not protected at all from observation by those standing in open fields. Although agents did peer into a barn that was arguably protected by the Fourth Amendment, any such observation from open fields was not protected. (This is the "plain view doctrine", though it is not labeled as such in Dunn.)

In Jardines, the Court noted that, while police can stop a person on an open highway, they are prohibited from peering into the windows of a private home from the front porch, absent probable cause.

=== History ===
The Fourth Amendment protects "persons, houses, papers, and effects". In modern cases, the Supreme Court interprets "a house" to mean "a home and its curtilage". It is not obvious when the Court first equated "house" with "home", though Prigg v. Pennsylvania (1842) seems to assume that "house" means "home".

The first uses of the term "curtilage" by the Supreme Court appeared in the decisions of two unrelated cases from 1864. United States v. Stone (1864), involved a boundary dispute over Fort Leavenworth, as to "what lands properly belonged to this military post, and the proper curtilage necessary for the use and enjoyment of it".

In Sheets v. Selden's Lessee (1864), the Court referred to "a grant of a messuage or a messuage with the appurtenances will carry the dwelling-house and adjoining buildings, and also its orchard, garden, and curtilage".

=== Application ===
The Supreme Court holds that the Fourth Amendment protects homes and their curtilage from unreasonable searches without a warrant. However, curtilage is afforded less protection than a home. Absent "No Trespassing" signs or fences with locked gates, it is considered reasonable for a person (including a police officer) to walk from a public area to the obvious main entrance to the home using the most obvious path in order to "knock and talk" with a resident. But otherwise, government agents need consent, a warrant, or probable cause of exigent circumstances to enter a home's curtilage.

Many state constitutions have clauses similar to the Fourth Amendment of the U.S. Constitution, and many have "castle laws" which use the term "curtilage". Although states are entitled to interpret their definitions different from (and subordinate to) the U.S. Fourth Amendment, they generally interpret "houses" the same way as does the Supreme Court, including its definition of "curtilage".

== In UK listed-building legislation ==
The concept of curtilage is relevant to town and country planning in the United Kingdom, particularly as it relates to listed building legislation. The consideration afforded to a listed building may extend to other structures or landscape within the curtilage of the primary structure, if the item(s) in the curtilage is old enough, and physically attached to the main building or otherwise important to the setting of the structure. Current legislation uses a cut-off date of 1947, so that later additions, while they may be within the curtilage, are not included in the listing designation.

The listing of a building or structure does not define its specific curtilage, and so this can become a matter of interpretation and contention. Various factors need to be taken into account, such as the way that the setting works with the primary object, the ownership of the land, the historic use of the land, and physical or visual boundaries, such as fences, walls and hedges.

Curtilage is frequently undefined until someone wishes to make a change to a structure or landscape in the immediate vicinity of a listed building. Some local planning authorities (such as Bournemouth Borough Council) publish provisional curtilages, to assist property owners; but frequently the curtilage is left undefined until such time as it may be challenged in the planning process or in law.

== See also ==
- California v. Ciraolo
- California v. Greenwood
