= List of United States Supreme Court cases, volume 488 =

This is a list of all the United States Supreme Court cases from volume 488 of the United States Reports:

Case name	Citation	Date decided
Rhodes v. Stewart	488 U.S. 1	1988
The entry of a declaratory judgment in a party's favor does not automatically render that party prevailing. A declaratory judgment, like any other judgment, constitutes relief only if it affects the behavior of the defendant towards the plaintiff.
Pennsylvania v. Bruder	488 U.S. 9	1988
Town of Huntington v. NAACP	488 U.S. 15	1988
Shell Oil Co. v. Iowa Dept. of Revenue	488 U.S. 19	1988
The Outer Continental Shelf Lands Act does not prevent Iowa from including income earned from the sale of oil and gas extracted from the Outer Continental Shelf in its apportionment formula for calculating in-state taxable income.
Lockhart v. Nelson	488 U.S. 33	1988
When a reviewing court determines that a defendant's conviction must be set aside because certain evidence was erroneously admitted against him, and further finds that, once that evidence is discounted, there is insufficient evidence to support the conviction, the Double Jeopardy Clause does not forbid his retrial so long as the sum of the evidence offered by the State and admitted by the trial court—whether erroneously or not—would have been sufficient to sustain a guilty verdict.
Arizona v. Youngblood	488 U.S. 51	1988
Penson v. Ohio	488 U.S. 75	1988
Carlucci v. Doe	488 U.S. 93	1988
Pittston Coal Group v. Sebben	488 U.S. 105	1988
McNamara v. Dept. of Social Servs.	488 U.S. 152	1988
Beech Aircraft Corp. v. Rainey	488 U.S. 153	1988
NCAA v. Tarkanian	488 U.S. 179	1988
Bowen v. Georgetown University Hospital	488 U.S. 204	1988
Harbison-Walker Refractories v. Brieck	488 U.S. 226	1988
Olden v. Kentucky	488 U.S. 227	1988
Owens v. Okure	488 U.S. 235	1989
Goldberg v. Sweet	488 U.S. 252	1989
Perry v. Leeke	488 U.S. 272	1989
Duquesne Light Co. v. Barasch	488 U.S. 299	1989
Reed v. Transp. Union	488 U.S. 319	1989
Allegheny Pittsburgh Coal Co. v. Webster Cnty.	488 U.S. 336	1989
Sheet Metal Workers v. Lynn	488 U.S. 347	1989
Mistretta v. United States	488 U.S. 361	1989
Argentine Republic v. Amerada Hess Shipping Corp.	488 U.S. 428	1989
Florida v. Riley	488 U.S. 445	1989
Richmond v. Croson Co.	488 U.S. 469	1989
United States v. Broce	488 U.S. 563	1989
Oring v. State Bar of Cal.	488 U.S. 590	1989
Dept. of Social Servs. v. Bouknight	488 U.S. 1301	1988
John Doe Agency v. John Doe Corp.	488 U.S. 1306	1989
California v. Freeman	488 U.S. 1311	1989
