= People v. Diaz =

- Supreme Court of California

Argued October 5, 2010 Decided January 3, 2011
- Full case name: The People v. Gregory Diaz
- Citation(s): 51 Cal. 4th 84; 244 P.3d 501; 119 Cal. Rptr. 3d 105; 2011

Case history
- Prior history: Review granted, California Court of Appeals decision unpublished

Holding
- Affirmed the judgment of the Court of Appeals denying motion to suppress evidence obtained without warrant from Diaz's cell phone upon lawful custodial arrest.

Court membership
- Chief Justice: Joyce L. Kennard (Acting)
- Associate Justices: Kathryn Werdegar, Ming Chin, Marvin R. Baxter, Carol Corrigan, Ronald M. George, Carlos R. Moreno

Case opinions
- Majority: Chin, joined by Baxter, Corrigan, George
- Concurrence: Kennard
- Concur/dissent: Werdegar, joined by Moreno

Laws applied
- U.S. Const. Amend. IV
- Overruled by
- Riley v. California, 573 US 373 (2014)

People v. Diaz, 51 Cal. 4th 84, 244 P.3d 501, 119 Cal. Rptr. 3d 105 (Cal. January 3, 2011) was a Supreme Court of California case, which held that police are not required to obtain a warrant to search information contained within a cell phone in a lawful arrest. In a sting operation conducted by local police, the defendant, Gregory Diaz, was arrested for the sale of the illicit drug ecstasy and his cellphone, containing incriminating evidence, was seized and searched without a warrant. In trial court proceedings, Diaz motioned to suppress the information obtained from his cellphone, which was denied on the grounds that the search of his cellphone was incident to a lawful arrest. The California Court of Appeal affirmed the court's decision and was later upheld by the California Supreme Court. In 2014, the United States Supreme Court overruled that position in Riley v. California and held that without a warrant, police may not search the digital information on a cellphone that has been seized incident to arrest.

== Background ==
Around 2:50 p.m. on April 25, 2007, Gregory Diaz was observed participating in an illicit ecstasy transaction with a police informant. Diaz drove to the location of sale that had been agreed upon with the police informant, and the sale took place shortly after the informant had gotten in the back seat of the car that Diaz was driving. Immediately upon the completion of the sale, Deputy Sheriff Victor Fazio, of the Ventura County Sheriff's Department, who was listening in to the transaction through a microphone hidden on the informant, pulled Diaz's car over and arrested him for conspiracy to sell drugs. Six tablets of ecstasy and a small amount of marijuana was found on Diaz's person, as well as his cellphone.

At the sheriff's station, a detective took Diaz's cell phone and handed it over to Fazio, who took it into evidence. At about 4:18 p.m., Fazio interviewed the defendant, who denied the charges against him. After the interview, at about 4:23 p.m., 90 minutes after the seizure of the cellphone, Fazio looked through Diaz's text messages and found a message that read, "6 4 80," which Fazio took to mean "6 pills of ecstasy for $80." Diaz confessed to the crime shortly after he had been shown the text message by Fazio.

== Lower court decision ==
In trial court proceedings, Diaz filed a motion to suppress the evidence found on his cell phone, citing Fourth Amendment protections against unreasonable search and seizure. The trial court denied the motion and cited the fact that "incident to the arrest, search of his person and everything that turned up is really fair game in terms of being evidence of a crime or instrumentality of a crime or whatever the theory might be." Upon denial of suppression, Diaz pleaded guilty to transportation of a controlled substance.

== Decision and rationale ==
The California Supreme Court held that seizure of Diaz's cell phone was lawful because the seizure occurred during a search incident to arrest, an exception to the Fourth Amendment. The court reasoned that the US Supreme Court had established a precedent in several cases in which officers were allowed to seize objects under an arrestee's control and perform searches of those objects without warrant for the purpose of preserving evidence.

In doing so, the court applied the reasoning of United States v. Robinson, which held that the unwarranted search and seizure of a cigarette carton on Robinson's body was valid. The court, with Robinson in mind, contended that an arrest allows a valid search of an arrestee's person and belongings. The court then proceeded to apply United States v. Edwards to hold that the search was valid although it had occurred 90 minutes after the arrest. In Edwards, an arrestee's clothing was seized 10 hours after the arrest to preserve evidence (paint chips) that might be present on the clothes.

The Court then considered United States v. Chadwick, which held that any object associated with an arrestee may be searched incident to arrest, a precedent that supported the claim that the search of Diaz's cellphone was valid incident to his arrest. Under Chadwick, Diaz's cellphone was not only on his person but also then directly associated with him and so a delayed search of the cellphone 90 minutes after the seizure was valid.

Given the three cases, the Supreme Court concluded that the search and seizure of Diaz's cellphone was valid.

== Concurrence and dissent ==
=== Kennard's concurrence ===
Acting Chief Justice Kennard concurred with the court's judgement, with a few exceptions. Kennard noted that in its earlier rulings surrounding the doctrine of search incident to arrest, the Supreme Court probably did not have cellphones in mind because Robinson, Edwards, and Chadwick were decided in an era before mobile communications. However, Kennard then proceeded to contend that it is not the lower court's responsibility to challenge the decisions of the Supreme Court but only to apply its precedents until the Supreme Court decides to revise them, as the Supreme Court warned in Rodriguez de Quijas v. Shearson/American Express Inc.

=== Werdegar's dissent ===
Justice Werdegar focused her dissent on three key arguments: the cellphone was a relatively-new piece of technology, the search of the cellphone occurred some time after it had been confiscated, and the precedents cited by the Court did not apply to the cellphone as a "container."

Werdegar argued when Robinson and Edwards were decided, the Supreme Court did not have enough information about cellphones to establish a precedent for their search. "Containers" mentioned in the cases, such as clothing or a cigarette carton, are not analogous to the cellphone, which can contain wealth of private electronic data. Werdegar was especially concerned that the size of cellphone storage could contain "thousands of images or other digital files."

Werdegar proceeded to reason that the search occurred after the cell phone had already been seized from Diaz and so it was not actually under Diaz's control, effectively negating the preservation of evidence exemption of the Fourth Amendment.

In a more philosophical argument, Werdegar contended that the privacy limitations of search and seizure upon arrest extended only to the arrestee's body, not the intangible data contained within the cellphone, which holds far more information than any container or item that could lawfully be seized. In allowing such broad seizures, Werdegar worried that the ruling would potentially give police a "carte blanche" and the legal right to search and seize any article or object belonging to an arrestee incident to arrest.

=== Court's response to dissent ===
Responding to Werdegar's contention that a cellphone is distinct from a cigarette carton or clothes on an arrestee's body, the Court cited United States v. Ross in which the Supreme Court held that no privacy existed in packages, regardless of their type, shape, or size, during the search of a car. Applied to Diaz, the Court reasoned that a cellphone was no different from any other container on Diaz's person. For the purposes of applying the past precedents of Robinson and Chadwick, the court continued, Diaz's cellphone is a container like any other.

In response to the argument that a cellphone has a much larger storage capacity than any item that Diaz could have carried on his person, the Court asserted that there was no evidence that it had a significant storage capacity. Besides, the Court reasoned, like that the size of an item should not be relevant; otherwise, it would be increasingly difficult for law enforcement to uphold the law when such distinctions in container size could be made.

Considering the dissent's contention that data on the cellphone was theoretically not on Diaz's body, the Court cited Supreme Court precedent that allowed any object found on an arrestee's body to be searched, regardless of externalities. The location of the data was irrelevant insofar as the container was associated with and under Diaz's control.

Lastly, the Court argued that despite the fact that the search occurred 90 minutes after the arrest, after the precedent in Edwards, had established the legitimacy of that particular search.

== Implications ==
Many experts in the field argue that unlike traditional objects that can be lawfully seized, a cellphone contains far more personal data, incriminating or otherwise, and the problem with the Diaz ruling, as stated by Justice Moreno in the dissenting opinion, is that it "goes much further, apparently allowing police carte blanche, with no showing of exigency, to rummage at leisure through the wealth of personal and business information that can be carried on a mobile phone or handheld computer merely because the device was taken from an arrestee's person."

== Aftermath ==
On February 18, 2011, shortly after the Diaz decision, California State Senator Mark Leno introduced SB 914 in the California Legislature to require a warrant to search an arrestee's cellphone. The measure passed both the California Senate and the California Assembly with a bipartisan vote of 31–4 and 28-9, respectively. The bill was vetoed by Governor Jerry Brown on October 9, 2011, which was sustained by the legislature on March 1, 2012.

In a somewhat-similar federal case, United States v. Flores-Lopez, the Seventh Circuit Court of Appeals on February 29, 2012, upheld the warrantless search of a cellphone upon arrest by a reasoning similar to Diaz.

Jay Leiderman, Diaz's attorney who originally filed the motion to suppress at trial, called the court decision "weak" and a "scary one" because it relies on older US Supreme Court cases that have not kept up with today's modern technology in which cellphones and smartphones can hold tens of thousands of pieces of information: "This type of thing opens up the doors for Big Brother to come flying in."

== Overturned ==
On June 25, 2014, the US Supreme Court overturned the decision in Riley v. California. It held that without a warrant, police may not search the digital information on a cellphone that has been seized incident to arrest.

== See also ==
- United States v. Robinson (1973)
- Virginia v. Moore (2008)
- Ontario v. Quon (2010)
- United States v. Jones (2012)
- Information privacy law
