= Traffic stop =

Detention of a driver by police

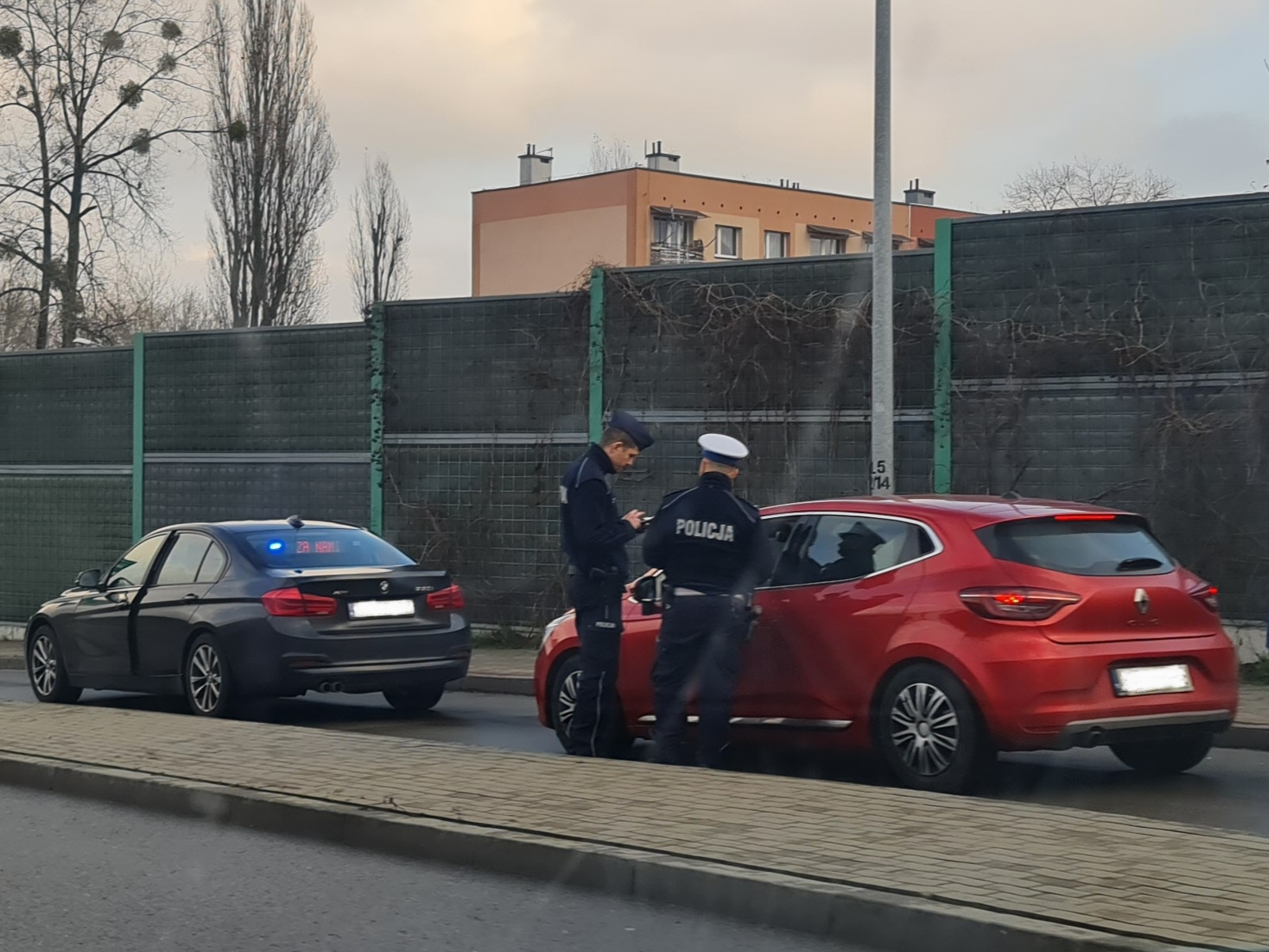
Policja officers conducting a traffic stop in Zabrze, Poland

A traffic stop, colloquially referred to as being pulled over, is a temporary detention of a driver of a vehicle and its occupants by police to investigate a possible crime or minor violation of law.

== United States ==
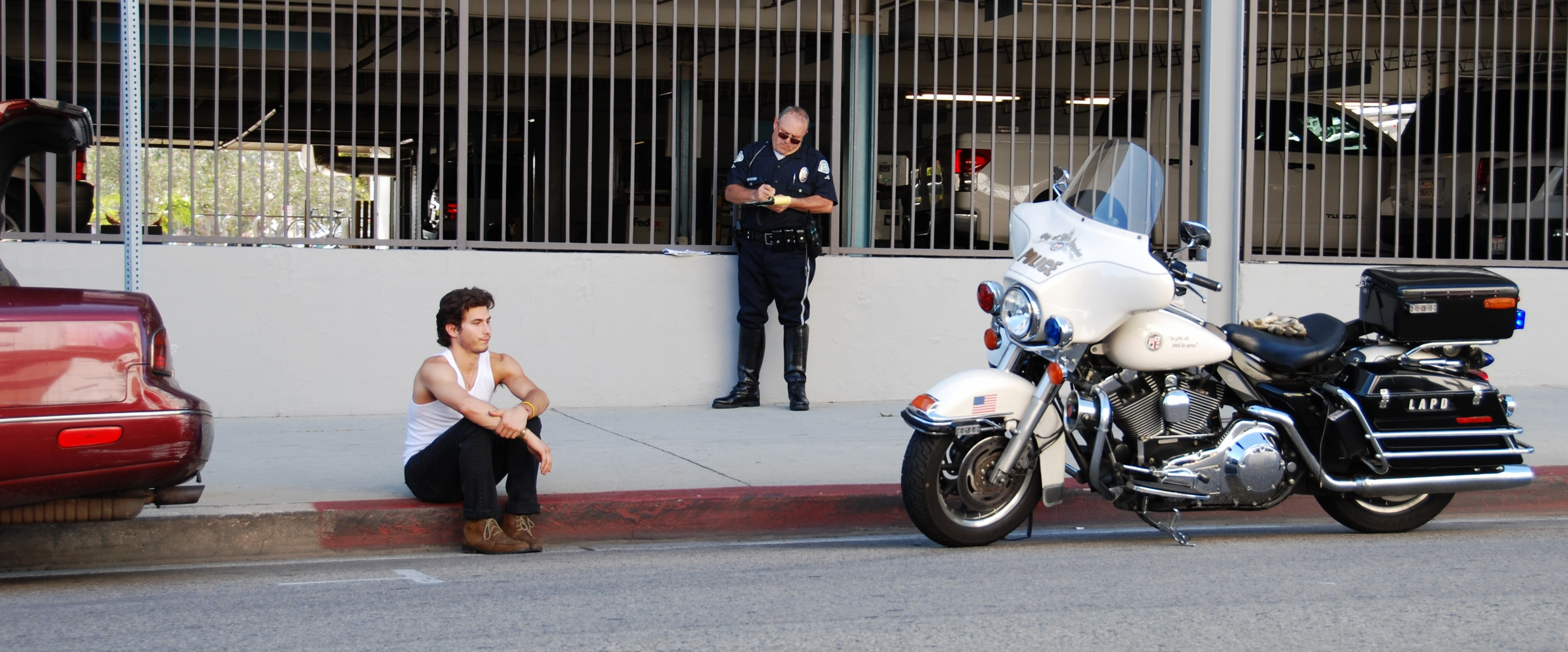
A Los Angeles Police Department motor officer writing a traffic ticket for a motorist

A traffic stop is usually considered to be a Terry stop and, as such, is a seizure by police; the standard set by the United States Supreme Court in Terry v. Ohio regarding temporary detentions requires only reasonable articulable suspicion that a crime has occurred or is about to occur. Traffic stops can be initiated at any time during the detention and arrest process, ranging from stops prior to arrest or issuance of a ticket for violation based on probable cause.

Traffic stops date to the 1920s.

=== Before probable cause ===
Traffic stops may be executed upon reasonable articulable suspicion that a crime has occurred, for example, an observation of a possible equipment violation or a suspicion of driving under the influence (DUI) based on driving behavior. In some jurisdictions, general roadblock checkpoints are applied for random checks of driver. A primary purpose of the traffic stop at this point is frequently to determine if the police have probable cause for arrest. At this stage, the police are not required to issue a Miranda warning, because a traffic stop prior to formal arrest is not considered to be custodial under Miranda, and will often ask questions intended to elicit the suspect to provide answers that may be used as evidence in the event of an arrest.

Non-evidentiary testing falls under this stage because implied consent laws in the US generally do not apply to Preliminary Breath Test (PBT) testing (small handheld devices, as opposed to evidential breath test devices). (For some violations, such as refusals by commercial drivers or by drivers under 21 years of age, some US jurisdictions may impose implied consent consequences for a PBT refusal, but these are generally not considered to be a refusals under the general "implied consent" laws.) Participation in "field sobriety tests" (FSTs or SFSTs) is voluntary in the U.S..

=== Probable cause ===
Probable cause is the arrest stage in which sufficient evidence is available to sustain a warrant for arrest. Probable cause is a stronger standard of evidence than a reasonable suspicion, but weaker than what is required to secure a criminal conviction. In some cases, notably DUI stops, the "sufficient evidence" is used for requiring an evidentiary chemical test (e.g., evidential breathalyzer test) by invoking an implied consent request. While state terminology regarding whether evidentiary testing is an "arrest", such testing is constitutionally a "search incident to arrest".

=== Procedure ===
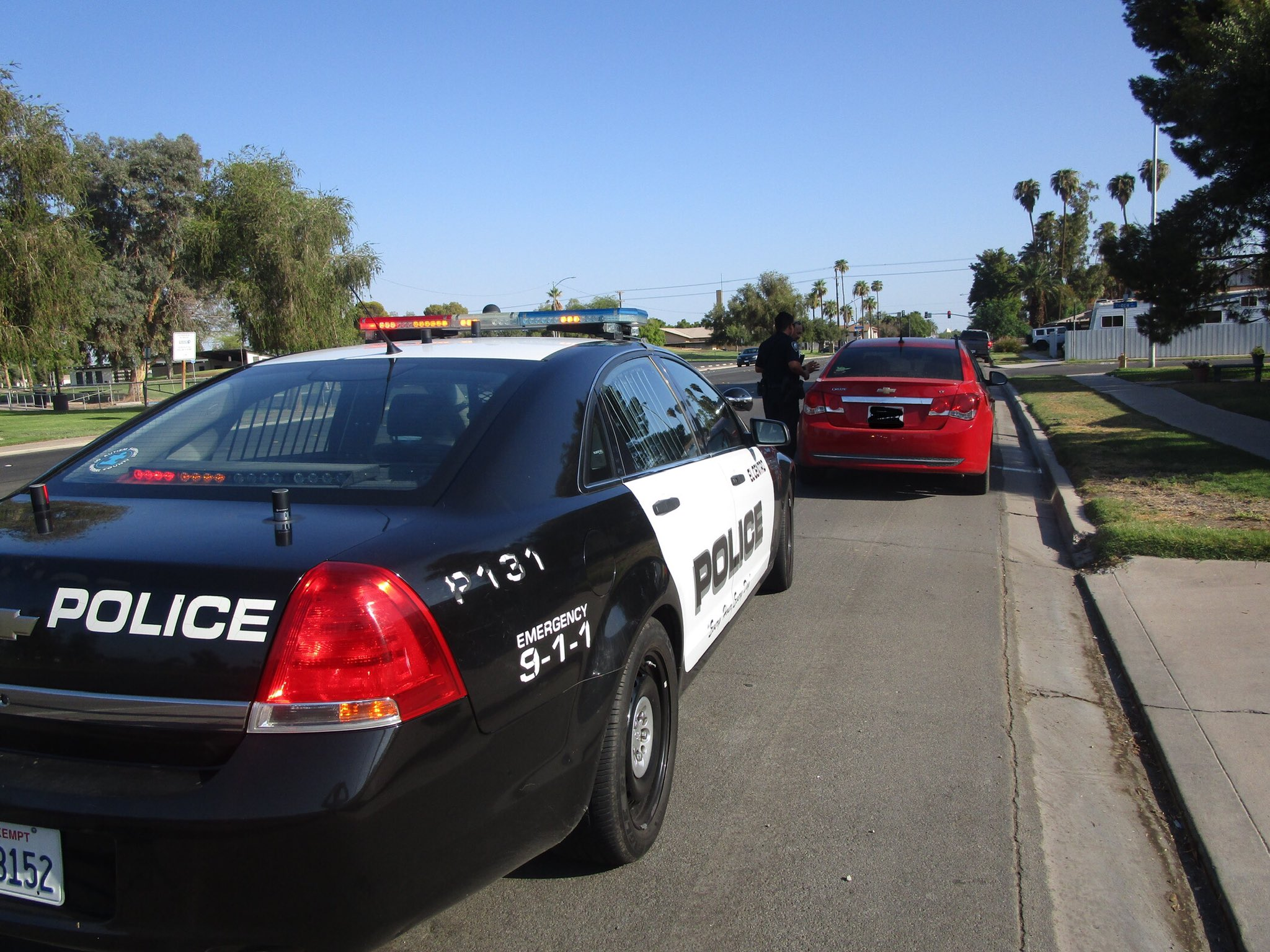
An El Centro Police Department officer conducting a traffic stop

A stop is usually accomplished through a process known as "pulling over" the suspect's vehicle. Police vehicles (except those used by undercover personnel) traditionally have sirens, loudspeakers, and lightbars that rotate or flash. These devices are used by the officer to get the attention of the suspect and to signal that they are expected to move over to the shoulder and stop. Failure to comply could result in citation of failure to yield to an emergency vehicle and possibly raise suspicion that the driver is attempting to flee.

Similar alerting devices are also typically equipped on other emergency vehicles such as fire trucks and ambulances, although police departments often use blue lights to signal drivers to pull over. In all cases, such signals and the laws requiring that other vehicles pull to the shoulder allow the emergency vehicles to pass other traffic safely and efficiently when responding to emergency situations. In the case of a traffic stop, the officer pulls the patrol vehicle behind the subject vehicle as it stops instead of proceeding past as they would during other emergency responses.

Depending upon the severity of the offense which the officer believes to have occurred, the officer may either arrest the suspect, by taking them to jail, or check for any outstanding warrants before issuing a citation also called a notice to appear or summons in some jurisdictions, which is essentially a traffic ticket. In some cases, officers may choose to simply issue a verbal or written warning.

If the driver is not the owner of the car, they are only penalized for the ticket. However, in most cases, the owner of the car that was stopped has increased insurances rates. This is due to a rule put in place to protect insurance companies from fraudulent procedures.

Many states have enacted laws requiring freeway traffic approaching the police vehicle to merge over to the left, leaving an entire lane as a buffer zone for the officer.

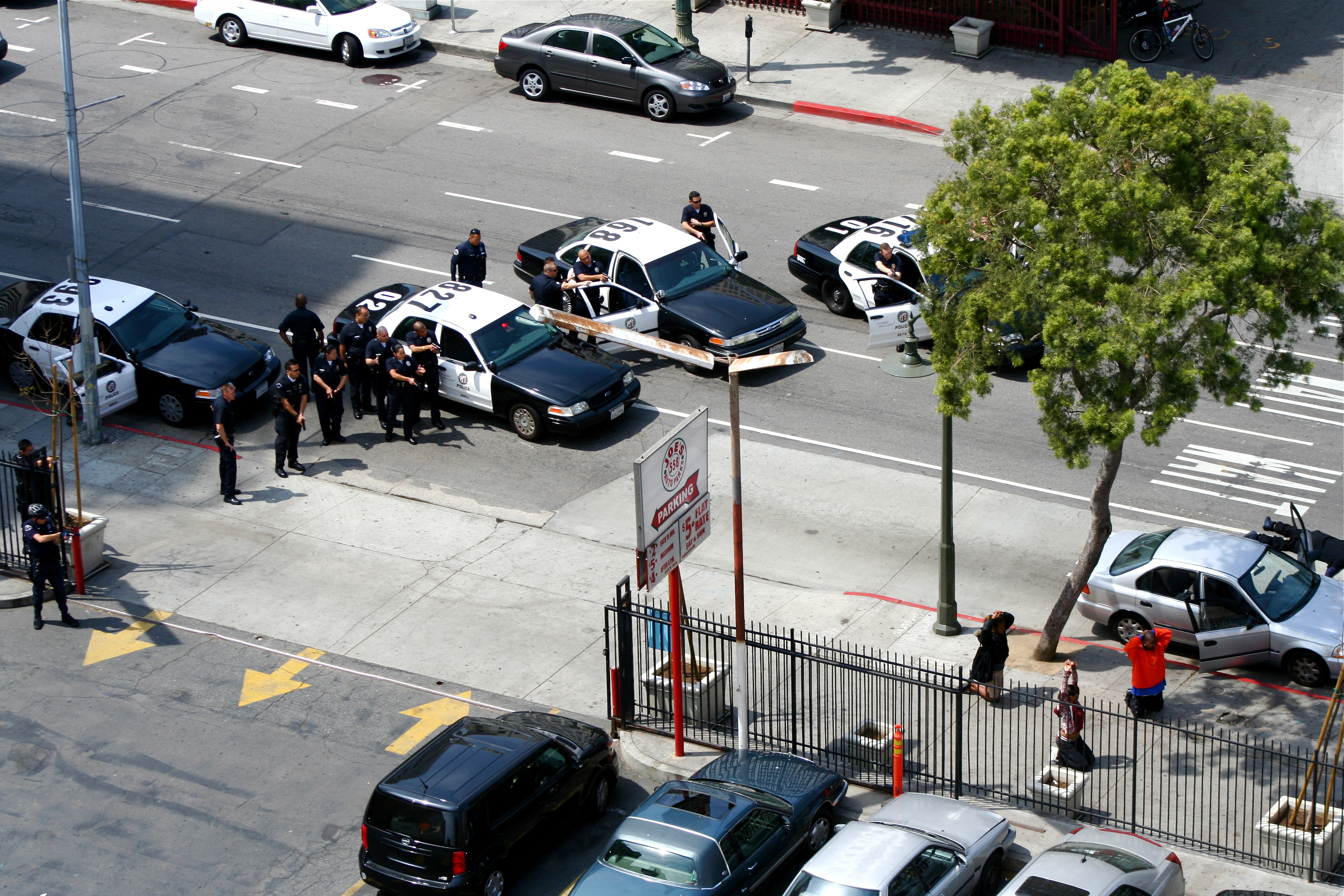
Los Angeles Police Department officers conducting a felony traffic stop

A "felony" or "high-risk" traffic stop occurs when police stop a vehicle which they have strong reason to believe contains a driver or passenger suspected of having committed a serious crime, especially of a nature that would lead the police to believe the suspects may be armed (such as an armed robbery, assault with a weapon, or an outstanding felony warrant for the registered owner). In a high risk stop, officers attempt to provide their own safety by issuing instructions to maintain absolute control over every step of the proceedings.

They will have additional officers on scene for back-up, often waiting for additional officers to join up before initiating the stop. They will typically have their weapons drawn, and stay back from the suspect's vehicle, using their patrol cars for cover. If there is no choice but to make the stop on a busy street, then they will often stop traffic. They will address the driver and any passengers over the PA speaker of the patrol car, typically instructing the driver to turn the engine off, remove the keys from the ignition, and sometimes toss them out the window. They will instruct the occupants, one at a time, to exit the vehicle with empty hands showing, place their hands on top of or behind their heads, walk backwards some distance, and then lie flat on the ground, where they will remain until all occupants have done likewise, at which point officers will move up, apply handcuffs, do a body search and then secure the suspects in the patrol cars. The vehicle is then typically searched for weapons and other evidence in accordance with the arresting department's standard operating procedures ("S.O.P.'s").

The Supreme Court has held that an officer who stops a vehicle as part of a routine traffic stop has the authority to order the driver to exit the vehicle, as well as to order any passengers to exit the vehicle.

=== Federal government ===
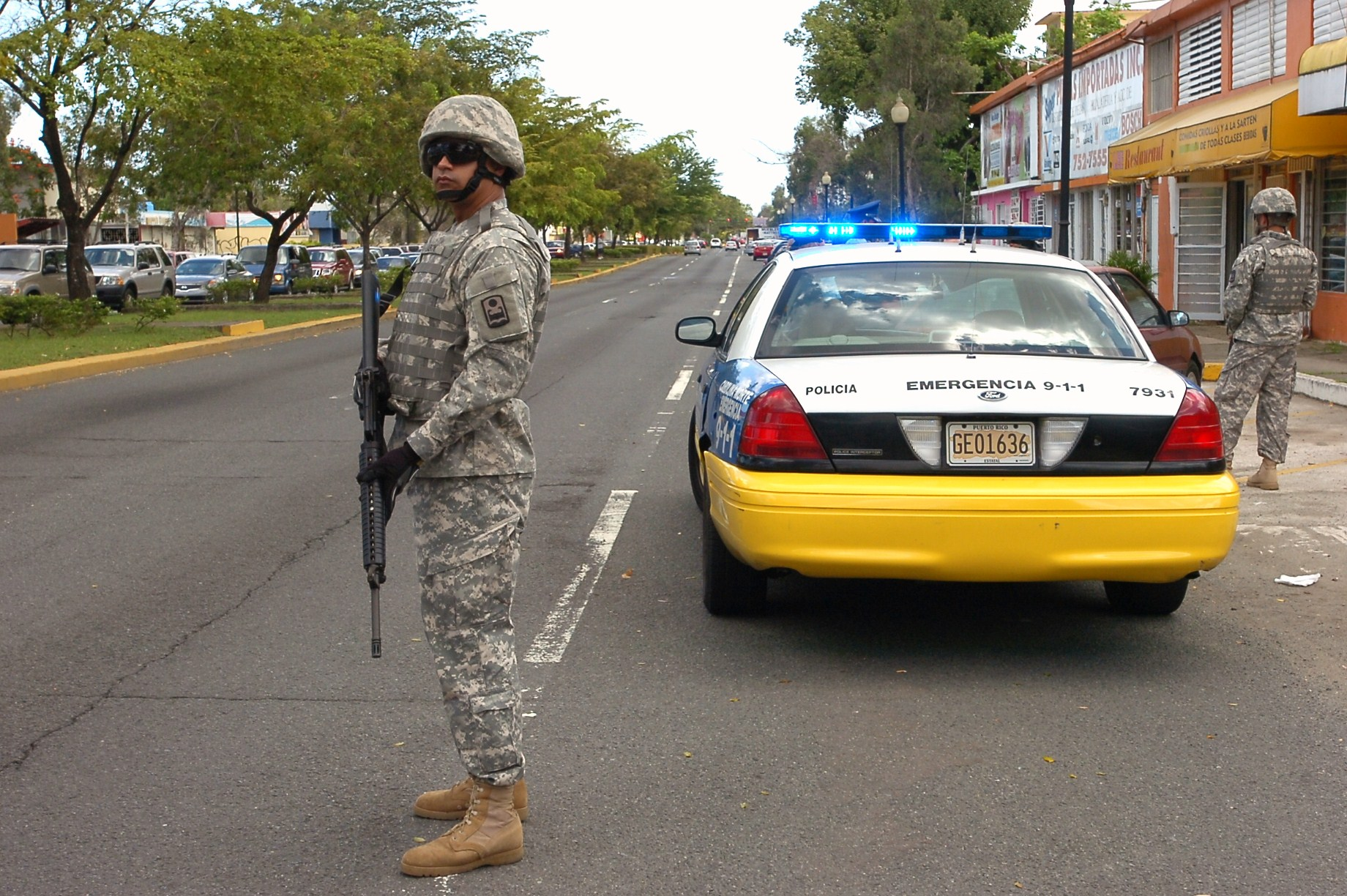
A Puerto Rico National Guard soldier assisting the Puerto Rico Police with a traffic stop, 2010. The National Guard was deployed to assist police while new police recruits were being trained.

The United States federal government has long used local traffic enforcement as a tool to further its goals through providing funding and training. Historically, this goal has been drug interdiction, but this has been expanded to include the war on terror. Currently, the National Highway Traffic Safety Administration (NHTSA) in cooperation with two agencies in the United States Department of Justice (the Bureau of Justice Assistance and the National Institute of Justice) actively promote a program called Data-Driven Approaches to Crime and Traffic Safety (DDACTS) which provides training to local police forces to combine traffic enforcement with fighting crime. In the past, such approaches have been accused of promoting racial profiling.

Federal grants to states often use the number of traffic tickets as a performance measure.

== Controversy ==
=== Reducing minor traffic stops ===
Several states and cities have restricted or discouraged minor traffic stops, such as for broken equipment, to avoid dangerous interactions between drivers and armed law enforcement, which put both police and drivers at risk and lower trust in the police. Nationally, 43% of traffic stops are for speeding, 24% for broken equipment, and 9% for suspected criminal activity. 730 police killings from 2017 to 2022 started with traffic stops. 7% of killings by police started with a traffic stop. Two thirds of killings by police started with no crime or a nonviolent crime.

Jurisdictions in some states can use traffic cameras, and then send tickets in the mail or pull the car over. In Texas, police can send a text message if both driver and police agency sign up for the service. California makes the registered owner liable for injuries and damage, and allows owner’s responsibility citations for equipment violations, so relevant tickets can be mailed to the registered owner. The California Highway Patrol and California Attorney General confirm the citation goes to the owner, for issues under the owner's control. California law makes both driver and owner responsible for equipment violations, but VEH 40001(e) says, except for out-of-state cars, not to cite the driver, so there is little reason for a traffic stop instead of mailing a ticket.

75% of police have not received recent hands-on training in removing a noncompliant person from a vehicle. Noncompliance was most common in cases of alcohol, drugs or illegal activity, and 42% of noncompliance involved disobeying the officer, while 24% involved not answering the officer' questions, a practice recommended by lawyers. Some North Carolina cities encouraged drivers to refuse searches by requiring the officer to get a signed form, which clarified the voluntary nature of searches.

Some departments have quotas for at least a minimum number of traffic stops per officer per month, or supervisor pressure.

Illinois in 2016 found contraband in one stop per 242. In July 2021 a study found that State patrol traffic stops were not associated with reduced motor vehicle crash deaths and suggested other strategies such as motor vehicle modifications, community-based safety initiatives, improved access to health care, or prioritizing trauma care as other reduction efforts. France, England and Wales use traffic stops at a quarter to a third of the US rate.

==== Table of state and local practices ====
Reasons which do not justify a traffic stop
Jurisdiction	State	Lights	Tags & stickers	Blocked view	Other	Pedestrian
Berkeley	CA	Only stop for serious safety issues: unsafe speed, pedestrian right-of-way at crosswalks, failure to yield for turns, red light violations, stop sign violations, seatbelt violations, distracted driving (hands free law), DUI.				
San Francisco City/County (subject to union negotiation)	CA	rear tag light out; taillights out in day; some but not all brake lights out	has rear tag but number not visible; no tag or expired less than 1 year	small items on window or mirror which don't make crash more likely	turn signal under 100' before turn; sleep in vehicle unless asked by another city agency	any pedestrian stop unless immediate crash danger
Los Angeles City	CA	(a) "minor equipment violations or other infractions" unless "officer believes" it "significantly interferes with public safety," or (b) "minor traffic or code violation" except if officer has information about a serious crime too				
Lansing	MI	license plate light out, cracked taillights		dangling ornaments, and window treatments	regulatory violations such as, cracked windshields, loud exhaust	
Brooklyn Center	MN	No immediate end to traffic stops, and issuing citations. Policy "prohibiting custodial arrests or consent searches of persons or vehicles, for any non-moving traffic infraction, non-felony offense, or non-felony warrant, unless otherwise required by law"				
Minneapolis	MN	License plate lights out. For other lights out a stop is allowed to give the driver a coupon to pay for repair	Expired tabs [sic]	Item dangling from the rearview mirror, unless that object impairs the driver’s ability to operate the vehicle safely		
Ramsey County	MN					
Fayetteville	NC					
Mecklenburg County	NC					
All state	OR	1 headlight, taillight or brake light, non-red taillight, license plate light				
Philadelphia, may mail citation or warning.	PA	1 light out	temporary registration visible but wrong place, lack inspection or emission sticker, registration up to 2 months late or loose	item obstructing driver's view	missing bumper	
Pittsburgh	PA	same as Philadelphia, police not following limits				
Memphis	TN	one light out	registration up to 2 months late or not secure, temporary registration shown in wrong place		bumper loose	
All state	VA	unapproved unsafe light, signal or glass, tail lights, license plate lights, brake lights if 1 works, 1 headlight	registration or inspection up to 4 months late	window tints, items blocking driver's view	noisy exhaust, marijuana odor, local vehicle ordinances unless jailable	jaywalking
All state	VT	Reports required by January & October 2023				
Chittenden County	VT					
Seattle	WA					

=== Racial disparities ===
Stanford has compiled data on race of drivers stopped in 200 million traffic stops. Stops are particularly common and harmful for minorities. California's annual report under the Racial and Identity Profiling Act (RIPA) highlights that minorities form a bigger share of traffic stops than their share of the residents in each area.

Several organizations have commented that comparing minority share of traffic stops to resident population is an erroneous approach, and that there are other possible comparisons, including: driving age population, traffic accidents, licensed drivers, traffic violators, arrests, and crime suspects. On average, minorities work more jobs and work from home less than non-minorities, so are on the road more than their share of the residential population. Also, police are called by people in minority neighborhoods more than elsewhere, so police are in a position to see more traffic violations there. The New Mexico Sentencing Commission in 2007 called the use of Census data on residents a "common, but very poor method," and listed other methods. A 2006 report from the US Department of Justice shows the different comparison groups used by studies up to that point. A 2023 study for the Peace Officers Research Association of California (PORAC) listed some of the same alternative comparison groups: licensed drivers, vehicle owners, center city populations, field studies, and traffic violators.

There is another way comparative reports underestimate the number of Black drivers. Typically statistics on residents call them Black only if they are not Hispanic, and are not mixed race. Mixed race and Hispanic residents are counted separately. Police will count people stopped as Black even if they are also Hispanic or are also of another race. (RIPA shows that police rarely classify drivers as multi-racial.) So the comparison of traffic stops underestimates the number of Blacks in the resident population and overestimates Blacks among the people stopped.

A Connecticut investigation found that 26,000 traffic tickets reported by state police did not appear in court records. The researchers hypothesized that state police were trying to look productive. The fake stops were disproportionately white, reducing apparent racial gaps. The police union said data entry errors were the likely cause.

=== Exemptions for police friends, families and contacts ===
Several police unions print cards for members to give to friends, family members, and professional contacts. Officers who make a traffic stop and are shown the card are under pressure to let the holder off with a warning instead of a ticket. The pressure can be from fellow officers and supervisors.

The cards have been issued in New York City, New Jersey, Boston, Los Angeles and Philadelphia. Cards were a "time-honored" tradition in Los Angeles by 1923 despite efforts by the police chief and a city councilman to stop them. The California Highway Patrol gave cards under Chief Cato, appointed in 1931. The cards were widespread in the United States in the 1950s, including by criminals. In 1976 the New Hampshire Governor handed them out to large contributors. The New York City Civilian Complaint Review Board in 2006 ruled the cards are private property and may not be confiscated without cause by police.

Law firms say that showing the card, and especially then asking for lenience, can be illegal if it is considered trying to influence an officer.

The cards have a racial effect, since police are disproportionately white. The cards go to whites disproportionately, including as Christmas gifts, leaving minorities with disproportionate tickets. The racial effect is increased when officers have quotas of tickets to issue, which then go disproportionately to minority citizens who lack a card.

The cards have been used since at least 1936. 20-30 have been given to each police officer each year, and 10-20 to each retired officer, so they have also been available on auction sites for up to $200.

=== Legal basis for stops ===
In the United States, traffic stops have been criticized for their use in police dragnets to check compliance with laws such as those requiring the use of seat belts or those prohibiting driving while impaired. Some people have objected that the tactic violates the United States Constitution; the Fourth Amendment to the Constitution, part of the Bill of Rights, contains a provision against unreasonable search and seizure. However, the United States Supreme Court has ruled that a motor vehicle is subject to a diminished expectation of privacy as compared to a home. Reasons include the fact that motor vehicles are typically driven on public streets, that said vehicles are generally subject to public licensing and registration requirements, and that said vehicles are generally held out to public view in a way different than that of traditional dwellings.

- In Delaware v. Prouse, 440 U.S. 648 (1979), the U.S. Supreme Court ruled that the police stopping vehicles for no reason other than to check the drivers' licenses and registrations was unconstitutional.
- In New York v. Belton, 453 U.S. 454 (1981), the U.S. Supreme Court ruled that when a police officer has made a lawful arrest of a driver, he may search the passenger area of the vehicle without obtaining a warrant. Recent Court decisions have limited the scope of the search even further.
- In Michigan Dept. of State Police v. Sitz, 496 U.S. 444 (1990), the U.S. Supreme Court ruled that the use of sobriety checkpoints is constitutional. Under the Ninth Amendment to the U.S. Constitution, states have the right to reasonably regulate the safety, health, and welfare of their citizens.
- In Illinois v. Caballes, 543 U.S. 405 (2005), the U.S. Supreme Court held that a dog sniff, conducted during a concededly lawful traffic stop that reveals no information other than the location of a substance that no individual has any right to possess, does not violate the Fourth Amendment.
- In Arizona v. Gant, (2008), the U.S. Supreme Court ruled that an officer must demonstrate a threat to their safety or a need to preserve evidence related to the crime of arrest in order to search a vehicle pursuant to an arrest, distinguishing New York v. Belton.
- In Rodriguez v. United States (2015), a case originating in federal court, the Supreme Court declared that the protraction of a traffic stop with the intent to use a sniffer dog to search for evidence for which no reasonable suspicion exists is violative of the Fourth Amendment.

== See also ==
- Traffic ticket
- Traffic police
- Highway patrol
- State police
- Traffic warden
- Consent search
- Car chase
- Motor vehicle exception
