= James Tomkovicz =

American educator and legal scholar (born 1951)

- Born: October 10, 1951 (age 75); Los Angeles, California, U.S.
- Occupations: Lawyer; professor

Academic background
- Education: University of Southern California (BA); University of California, Los Angeles (JD)

Academic work
- Discipline: Law
- Institutions: UCLA School of Law; University of Iowa College of Law; Emory University School of Law

James Joseph "Jim" Tomkovicz (born October 10, 1951 in Los Angeles, California) is an American educator and legal scholar. He was a professor of law at the University of Iowa College of Law from 1982 until 2021, when he retired from Iowa. While at Iowa he was awarded a chaired professorship, being named the Edward F. Howrey Professor of Law. After his four decades at Iowa, he was appointed Dean’s Professor at the Emory University School of Law for two years, an appointment which ended in 2023. Tomkovicz regularly taught Criminal Procedure (both investigation and adjudication), Criminal Law, and Evidence. He authored a number of scholarly works, almost all devoted to constitutional criminal procedure topics. During his career he also authored six amicus curiae briefs in the Supreme Court of the United States in cases raising criminal procedure issues. The cases included Knowles v. Iowa, Florida v. J.L., Maryland v. Blake, Kyllo v. United States, United States v. Patane and Arizona v. Gant. Tomkovicz was on the winning side in 4 of the 5 cases decided by the Justices. One case (Blake) was dismissed by the Court after oral argument.

== Books ==
Tomkovicz is the author of the criminal procedure casebook Criminal Procedure: Constitutional Constraints Upon Investigation and Proof (Carolina Academic Press), now in the ninth edition. He authored two additional books. The Right to the Assistance of Counsel: A Reference Guide to the United States Constitution and Criminal Procedure (Greenwood Press) is a thorough exegesis on criminal defendants’ constitutional entitlement to a lawyer’s aid. "Constitutional Exclusion: The Rules, Rights, and Remedies that Strike the Balance Between Freedom and Order," (Oxford University Press 2010) describes and analyzes the seven distinct constitutional bases for excluding potentially probative evidence of guilt from criminal proceedings.

== Scholarly works ==
Tomkovicz published law review articles in several law reviews during his career, including the University of California-Davis, Hastings, Illinois, Iowa, the Michigan Journal of Law Reform, Mississippi, North Carolina, Ohio State, Washington & Lee, William & Mary, and Yale.

== Criminal code reorganization ==
Tomkovicz was appointed to the "Iowa Criminal Code Reorganization Committee," a group charged by the Iowa legislature with studying and formulating revision of the Iowa Criminal Code. That legislative project, however, was abandoned by the Iowa legislature when control of the governorship changed hands.

== Employment ==
Tomkovicz joined the Iowa faculty in 1982 after serving as a visiting professor at Iowa in the spring of 1981 and an adjunct professor at the UCLA School of Law during the 1981-82 academic year. Prior to that, Tomkovicz was an attorney with the Appellate Section of the Lands Division of the Department of Justice in Washington, D.C. He also served as a law clerk to Hon. Edward J. Schwartz, Chief Judge of the U.S. District Court for the Southern District of California, and as law clerk to Hon. John M. Ferren, Associate Judge of the District of Columbia Court of Appeals. Tomkovicz served as a visiting professor at the UCLA School of Law on four occasions (2003, 2008, 2011, and 2013), and taught at the University of Michigan Law School (1992), the University of Southern California School of Law (2011), the Emory University School of Law (2019 and 2021-2023), the University of San Diego School of Law (2004, 2006), and in the London Law Consortium (2002).

== Education ==
Tomkovicz received his Juris Doctor in 1976 from the UCLA School of Law, graduating 5th in a class of 295. His academic honors included Order of the Coif and membership in the UCLA Law Review from 1974-1976. Tomkovicz received his Bachelor of Arts in 1973 from the University of Southern California graduating Summa Cum Laude in Psychology.

== Listing of works ==
Tomkovicz authored amicus curiae briefs in Knowles v. Iowa, Florida v. J.L., Kyllo v. United States, United States v. Patane, Maryland v. Blake, and Arizona v. Gant.
