= Thornton v. United States =

- Supreme Court of the United States

Argued March 31, 2005 Decided May 24, 2004
- Full case name: Marcus Thornton, Petitioner v. United States
- Citations: 541 U.S. 615 (more) 124 S.Ct. 2127; 158 L. Ed. 2d 905; 2004 U.S. LEXIS 3681
- Argument: Oral argument

Case history
- Prior: 325 F.3d 189 (4th Cir. 2003); cert. granted, 540 U.S. 980 (2003).

Holding
- Belton governs even when an officer does not make contact until the person arrested has left the vehicle.

Court membership
- Chief Justice William Rehnquist Associate Justices John P. Stevens · Sandra Day O'Connor; Antonin Scalia · Anthony Kennedy; David Souter · Clarence Thomas; Ruth Bader Ginsburg · Stephen Breyer

Case opinions
- Plurality: Rehnquist, joined by Kennedy, Thomas, Breyer
- Concurrence: O'Connor
- Concurrence: Scalia, joined by Ginsburg
- Dissent: Stevens, joined by Souter

Laws applied
- U.S. Const. amend. IV

Thornton v. United States, 541 U.S. 615 (2004), was a decision by the United States Supreme Court, which held that when a police officer makes a lawful custodial arrest of an automobile's occupant, the Fourth Amendment to the United States Constitution allows the officer to search the vehicle's passenger compartment as a contemporaneous incident of arrest. Thornton extended New York v. Belton, ruling that it governs even when an officer does not make contact until the person arrested has left the vehicle. Thornton also suggests a separate justification for an evidentiary search "when it is reasonable to believe evidence relevant to the crime of arrest might be found in the vehicle."

Thornton and Belton were distinguished by Arizona v. Gant, which restricted searches incident to arrest to circumstance where: 1) it is reasonable to believe that the arrested individual might access the vehicle at the time of the search; or 2) it is reasonable to believe that arrested individual's vehicle contains evidence of the offense that led to the arrest; or 3) the officer has probable cause to believe that there may be evidence of a crime concealed within the vehicle. Thus, while Arizona v. Gant modifies the search incident to arrest doctrine, it also leaves intact certain legal justifications for warrantless searches set forth in Chimel v. California, Thornton, and United States v. Ross.
