= Maryland v. Buie =

- Supreme Court of the United States

Argued December 4, 1989 Decided February 28, 1990
- Full case name: Maryland v. Buie
- Citations: 494 U.S. 325 (more) 110 S. Ct. 1093; 108 L. Ed. 2d 276
- Argument: Oral argument

Holding
- The Fourth Amendment permits a properly limited protective sweep in conjunction with an in-home arrest when the searching officer possesses a reasonable belief based on specific and articulable facts that the area to be swept harbors an individual posing a danger to those on the arrest scene. Court of Appeals of Maryland vacated and remanded.

Court membership
- Chief Justice William Rehnquist Associate Justices William J. Brennan Jr. · Byron White; Thurgood Marshall · Harry Blackmun; John P. Stevens · Sandra Day O'Connor; Antonin Scalia · Anthony Kennedy

Case opinions
- Majority: White, joined by Rehnquist, Blackmun, Stevens, O'Connor, Scalia, Kennedy
- Concurrence: Stevens
- Concurrence: Kennedy
- Dissent: Brennan, joined by Marshall

Laws applied
- U.S. Const. amend. IV

Maryland v. Buie, 494 U.S. 325 (1990), was a decision by the Supreme Court of the United States handed down in 1990. In the case, the Court held that the Fourth Amendment permits a properly limited protective sweep in conjunction with an in-home arrest when the searching officer possesses a reasonable belief based on specific and articulable facts that the area to be swept harbors an individual posing a danger to those on the arrest scene.

== Facts ==
Following an armed robbery of a Godfather's Pizza restaurant during which one of the robbers wore a red running suit, police officers in Prince George's County, Maryland obtained arrest warrants for Jerome Edward Buie and Lloyd Allen. While executing the arrest warrant, the officers fanned out through the first and second floors.

During this same time, one of the officers executing the arrest warrant twice shouted into the basement, ordering anyone down there to come out. A voice inquired who was calling, to which the officer responded "this is the police, show me your hands." Buie emerged from the basement. He was arrested, searched, and handcuffed by Rozar. Thereafter, another officer entered the basement to check whether there was someone else down there. He noticed a red running suit lying in plain view on a stack of clothing and seized it.

At issue in this case was the plain view doctrine of the Fourth Amendment. Specifically, the plain view doctrine allows a police officer to seize contraband or evidence in plain view without first obtaining a warrant provided that (1) he or she was lawfully located in the area where the evidence was observed and (2) the incriminating nature of the evidence was immediately apparent. Because the description of the robber included a red running suit, the "immediately apparent" prong was satisfied. The only question was whether the officer that made the observation was lawfully in the basement when he made the observation.

While Buie sought to suppress the running suit before trial for failing to satisfy the first prong, the trial court denied Buie's motion to suppress the running suit and the Maryland Court of Special Appeals affirmed. By a 4-3 vote, the Maryland Court of Appeals, (the state supreme court), reversed. The Supreme Court of the United States granted certiorari.

== Opinion of the Court ==
In upholding the legality of the entry into the basement and subsequent seizure of the running suit, Justice White relied on Terry v. Ohio, 392 U.S. 1 (1968) (permitting officers to conduct frisk of individual upon reasonable, articulable suspicion that person was armed and dangerous), and Michigan v. Long, 463 U.S. 1032 (1983) (permitting protective pat-down of motor vehicle for officer safety).

Utilizing the balancing test set forth in those opinions (need for officer security v. nature of intrusion), Justice White reasoned that the "arresting officers are permitted in such circumstances to take reasonable steps to ensure their safety after, and while making, the arrest." According to Justice White, "That interest [officer safety] is sufficient to outweigh the intrusion such procedures may entail."

Justice White set forth a two-part holding:

- As an incident to the arrest officers may, as a precautionary matter and without probable cause or reasonable suspicion, look in closets and other spaces immediately adjoining the place of arrest from which an attack could be immediately launched. This portion of the holding has been called into question.
- If an officer wishes to conduct a sweep of the premises, there must be articulable facts which, taken together with the rational inferences from those facts, would warrant a reasonably prudent officer in believing that the area to be swept harbors an individual posing a danger to those on the arrest scene.

Justice White distinguished the case of Chimel v. California, 395 U.S. 752 (1969), which held that in the absence of a search warrant, justifiable searches incident to a lawful arrest could not extend beyond the arrestee's person and the area from within which the arrestee might have obtained a weapon. First, Justice White explained that the search in Chimel was a full-blown search of the entire house. Moreover, the search was conducted for the purpose of finding evidence of the crime for which the arrest was made. In contrast, the officers in Buie were not looking for contraband.

Second, Justice White explained that the possible threat was different. White stated, "The justification for the search incident to arrest considered in Chimel was the threat posed by the arrestee, not the safety threat posed by the house, or more properly by unseen third parties in the house." The type of search authorized by the court in Buie is far removed from the top-to-bottom search involved in Chimel. It is not automatically permitted, and is only properly conducted only when justified by a reasonable, articulable suspicion that the house is harboring a person posing a danger to those on the arrest scene.

=== Justice Brennan's dissent ===
Justice Brennan, joined by Justice Marshall, took issue with extending the doctrines of Terry and Long to a private residence. According to Justice Brennan, physical entry of the home is the chief evil against which the wording of the Fourth Amendment is directed. He argued that essentially, because Terry and Long involved situations where criminal defendants were in locations which are afforded significantly less protection than the inside of a private residence, extending the doctrine in the manner that the majority did was inappropriate.

== See also ==
- List of United States Supreme Court cases, volume 494
