= New York v. Belton =

- Supreme Court of the United States

Argued April 27, 1981 Decided July 1, 1981
- Full case name: New York v. Roger Belton
- Citations: 453 U.S. 454 (more) 101 S. Ct. 2860; 69 L. Ed. 2d 768

Case history
- Prior: Certiorari to the Court of Appeals of New York

Holding
- When a police officer has made a lawful custodial arrest of the occupant of an automobile, the officer may, as a contemporaneous incident of that arrest, search the passenger compartment of that automobile.

Court membership
- Chief Justice Warren E. Burger Associate Justices William J. Brennan Jr. · Potter Stewart; Byron White · Thurgood Marshall; Harry Blackmun · Lewis F. Powell Jr. William Rehnquist · John P. Stevens

Case opinions
- Majority: Stewart, joined by Burger, Blackmun, Powell, Rehnquist
- Concurrence: Rehnquist
- Concurrence: Stevens
- Dissent: Brennan, joined by Marshall
- Dissent: White, joined by Marshall

New York v. Belton, 453 U.S. 454 (1981), was a United States Supreme Court case in which the Court held that when a police officer has made a lawful custodial arrest of the occupant of an automobile, the officer may, as a contemporaneous incident of that arrest, search the passenger compartment of that automobile. Therefore, Belton extended the so-called "Chimel rule" of searches incident to a lawful arrest, established in Chimel v. California (1969), to vehicles. The Supreme Court sought to establish bright line rules to govern vehicle search incident to eliminate some confusion in the cases.

== Background ==
A New York State Police trooper stopped a speeding car. No one in the car knew the owner. The officer could smell marijuana, and he saw an envelope on the floor marked "Supergold" which he could see probably contained marijuana. He ordered the occupants out of the car and arrested them. He patted them down and then directed them to stand apart. He searched the passenger compartment and found cocaine in a pocket of Belton's jacket. The New York Court of Appeals suppressed the search because there no longer was any danger of destruction of evidence.

== Opinion of the court ==
The Supreme Court noted that "no straightforward rule has emerged from the litigated cases respecting the question ... of the proper scope of a search of the interior of an automobile incident to a custodial arrest of its occupants." The Court thus resolved to establish a definitive rule and held:

Our reading of the cases suggests the generalization that articles inside the relatively narrow compass of the passenger compartment of an automobile are in fact generally, even if not inevitably, within "the area into which an arrestee might reach in order to grab a weapon or evidentiary ite[m]. Chimel, supra, at 763. In order to establish the workable rule this category of cases requires, we read Chimel's definition of the limits of the area that may be searched in light of that generalization. Accordingly, we hold that when a [police officer] has made a lawful custodial arrest of the occupant of an automobile, [the officer] may, as a contemporaneous incident of that arrest, search the passenger compartment of that automobile.

It follows from this conclusion that the police may also examine the contents of any containers found within the passenger compartment, for if the passenger compartment is within reach of the arrestee, so also will containers in it be within his reach. United States v. Robinson, supra; Draper v. United States, 358 U.S. 307. Such a container may, of course, be searched whether it is open or closed, since the justification for the search is not that the arrestee has no privacy interest in the container, but that the lawful custodial arrest justifies the infringement of any privacy interest the arrestee may have. Thus, while the Court in Chimel held that the police could not search all the drawers in an arrestee's house simply because the police had arrested him at home, the Court noted that drawers within an arrestee's reach could be searched because of the danger their contents might pose to the police. Chimel v. California, supra, at 763.

The Court distinguished Chadwick and Sanders as not involving "an arguably valid search incident to a lawful custodial arrest."

Thus, under Belton, the entire passenger compartment of an automobile is subject to search under the search incident doctrine even if the arrestee is out of the car.

A nexus is required between the vehicle and the person arrested with or in the vehicle prior to the arrest.

== Response to Belton ==
Belton has been criticized by legal scholars for failing to meet the constitutional standard of probable cause.

Belton has been distinguished by Arizona v. Gant (2009), which restricted searches incident to arrest to circumstances where it is reasonable to believe that: 1) the arrested individual might access the vehicle at the time of the search; or 2) the arrested individual's vehicle contains evidence of the offense that led to the arrest.

== See also ==
- List of United States Supreme Court cases, volume 453
