= City of Ontario v. Quon =

2010 U.S. Supreme Court case on electronic privacy issues

- Supreme Court of the United States

Argued April 19, 2010 Decided June 17, 2010
- Full case name: City of Ontario, California, et al., Petitioners v. Jeff Quon, et al.
- Docket no.: 08-1332
- Citations: 560 U.S. 746 (more) 130 S. Ct. 2619; 177 L. Ed. 2d 216
- Argument: Oral argument

Case history
- Prior: Judgment for defendants, 445 F. Supp. 2d 1116, C.D. Cal. 2006, rev'd sub nom Quon v. Arch Wireless, 529 F.3d 892 9th Cir. 2008; petition for en banc rehearing denied, 554 F.3d 769 (9th Cir. 2008); certiorari granted, 550 U.S. ___.
- Subsequent: None

Holding
- Discovery of sexually explicit and otherwise personal text messages sent from police department-owned pager, resulting in disciplinary action against officer pager had been issued to, was incident to reasonable, work-related audit intended to assess efficacy of monthly character limit.

Court membership
- Chief Justice John Roberts Associate Justices John P. Stevens · Antonin Scalia; Anthony Kennedy · Clarence Thomas; Ruth Bader Ginsburg · Stephen Breyer; Samuel Alito · Sonia Sotomayor

Case opinions
- Majority: Kennedy, joined by Roberts, Stevens, Thomas, Ginsburg, Breyer, Alito, Sotomayor; Scalia (except Part III–A)
- Concurrence: Stevens
- Concurrence: Scalia (in part)

Laws applied
- U.S. Const. amend. IV

Ontario v. Quon, 560 U.S. 746 (2010), is a United States Supreme Court case concerning the extent to which the right to privacy applies to electronic communications in a government workplace. It was an appeal by the city of Ontario, California, from a Ninth Circuit decision holding that it had violated the Fourth Amendment rights of two of its police officers when it disciplined them following an audit of pager text messages that discovered many of those messages were personal in nature, some sexually explicit. The Court unanimously held that the audit was work-related and thus did not violate the Fourth Amendment's protections against unreasonable search and seizure.

Ontario police sergeant Jeff Quon, along with other officers and those they were exchanging messages with, had sued the city, their superiors and the pager service provider in federal court. They had alleged a violation of not only their constitutional rights but federal telecommunications privacy laws. Their defense was that a superior officer had promised the pager messages themselves would not be audited if the officers reimbursed the city for fees it incurred when they exceeded a monthly character limit.

Justice Anthony Kennedy wrote the majority opinion signed by seven of his fellow justices. It decided the case purely on the reasonableness of the pager audit, explicitly refusing to consider "far-reaching issues" it raised on the grounds that modern communications technology and its role in society was still evolving. He nevertheless discussed those issues at some length in explaining why the Court chose not to rule on them, in addition to responding, for argument's sake, more directly to issues raised by the respondents. John Paul Stevens wrote a separate concurring opinion, as did Antonin Scalia, who would have used a different test he had proposed in an earlier case to reach the same result.

Outside commentators mostly praised the justices for this display of restraint, but Scalia criticized it harshly in his concurrence, calling it vague. He considered his fellow justices in "disregard of duty" for their refusal to address the Fourth Amendment issues. A month after the court handed down its decision, an appellate court in Georgia similarly criticized it for "a marked lack of clarity" as it narrowed an earlier ruling to remove a finding that there was no expectation of privacy in the contents of email. An article in The New York Times later summarized this criticism, and its "faux unanimity", as emblematic of what some judges and lawyers have found an increasingly frustrating trend in Roberts Court opinions.

== Underlying dispute ==
In 2001 the Ontario Police Department (OPD) acquired 20 alphanumeric pagers to distribute to officers in its SWAT unit so they could better coordinate their activities. The contract between the department and Arch Wireless, now USA Mobility, was for usage up to a fixed limit of 25,000 characters per month, above which an overage fee would be charged. Pager use was covered by the OPD's computer and Internet use policy, under which employees agreed that "the city reserves the right to monitor and log all network activity including e-mail and Internet use, with or without notice". The policy did not specifically mention text messages, but employees were told both verbally, at a staff meeting and through a memorandum that they were included and that only "light personal communications" were allowed during work hours. It also stated that "inappropriate, derogatory, obscene, suggestive, defamatory, or harassing language in the e-mail system will not be tolerated". Several officers, including Sgt. Jeff Quon, a 20-year veteran of the department, exceeded the limit during the first two billing cycles. He was allowed to reimburse the city for the fee. Lt. James Duke, head of the department's Administrative Bureau, told him that his communications would not be monitored if he paid the overage, but that he should stop using the pager so much. When Quon and another officer continued to exceed the limit and reimburse the city, Duke told then-Chief Lloyd Scharf he was "tired of being a bill collector". The OPD began to consider whether the character limit it had contracted for was too low and it was forcing officers to pay for work-related communications, as had sometimes happened in the past.

At Scharf's direction, Duke requested from Arch transcripts of text messages sent by Quon and the other officer. After verifying that the city was the subscriber on the account, an Arch employee sent Duke the transcripts. Many messages were personal and some were sexually explicit, sent by the married Quon to his girlfriend at work. In one month as few as 8% of Quon's texts had been work-related. A transcript from which messages sent when Quon and the other officer were off-duty had been redacted was sent to the OPD's internal affairs sergeant, and after an investigation Quon and the other officer were allegedly disciplined.

== Existing law ==
The case would involve two areas of law, both coming under the Fourth Amendment. The first was the privacy rights Quon and the other officers had over text messages sent on equipment paid for by their employers. The other was their rights as public employees, since their superiors were also agents of the state.

Congress had passed the Electronic Communications Privacy Act in 1986, which addressed issues raised as more and more companies stored records with highly personal data about individual consumers in off-site databases operated by third parties. A key section, known as the Stored Communications Act (SCA), distinguished between electronic communications services which actively transmitted and received data and remote communications services whose only role was to archive and backup transmitted data for at least some period of time. The former could release transmitted data only to its sender or recipient; the latter could also release that information to the subscriber regardless of who had sent or received it.

The following year, 1987, the Supreme Court had first dealt with the Fourth Amendment rights of government employees under administrative investigation in O'Connor v. Ortega, a case arising from the search of a supervising physician's office and records at a California public hospital. By a 5-4 margin the court had ruled that while public employees had Fourth Amendment protections, the search was reasonable and constitutional and that other such warrantless searches of public employees' belongings or workspace, where applicable, were similarly permissible as long as they were reasonably work-related in inception and scope.

The justices in that majority differed on what standards to use for evaluating the reasonableness of a search of a public employees' personal space and belongings. Sandra Day O'Connor wrote for a four-justice plurality declaring that government employees did not lose their Fourth Amendment rights at work. In the latter instance, since the working environments of public employees can be drastically different, leading to some where no reasonable expectation of privacy could be argued to exist, lower courts should consider the "operational realities" of the work environment when determining if a public employee's rights against unreasonable search and seizure were violated. Following the principle laid out in Connick v. Myers, an earlier decision concerning the constitutional rights of public employees, that "government offices could not function if every employment decision became a constitutional matter", the majority distinguished between searches "merely incident to the primary business of the agency," such as the retrieval of a document or tool from a desk or locker and thus not requiring a warrant at all, from those conducted to investigate a possible violation of workplace rules and procedures.

In a concurring opinion, Antonin Scalia rejected the plurality analysis, saying instead that "government searches to retrieve work-related materials or to investigate violations of workplace rules — searches of the sort that are regarded as reasonable and normal in the private employer context — do not violate the Fourth Amendment".

Since Scalia's opinion had provided the case's deciding vote, either it or the plurality could be used by lower courts until another such case were to come to the court and force a resolution of the question. The court would consider the Fourth Amendment rights of public employees again two years later, in 1989's Treasury Employees v. Von Raab. In that case another divided court upheld the Customs Service's requirement that applicants for positions that involved carrying a firearm and the possibility of drug interdiction undergo drug tests by urinalysis.

== Litigation ==
The case began in federal court. After a district court found in favor of the defendants, a three-judge appellate panel reversed the decision. The circuit court denied a petition for an en banc rehearing; a simultaneous certiorari petition to the Supreme Court was granted.

A major issue at all levels was whether the department's written Internet policy, or Duke's practice of just collecting the overage fee, was the operating reality of the OPD workplace. If it was the former, Quon had no reasonable expectation of privacy for his pager messages. The city and department argued that Duke could not set or amend policy so what he said was irrelevant. And even if it was, it did not matter since the pager messages could be disclosed under the California Public Records Act. The plaintiffs argued that since Duke was the officer in charge of the contract with Arch, and the policy change that covered the pagers was never communicated in any definitive way, his assurance that he would not read Quon's messages if he reimbursed the city was all that mattered.

For Quon's co-plaintiffs, there was what one commentator later called "the really tricky question in the case", their claim that the city violated their privacy in the course of investigating Quon. Two of the other plaintiffs were OPD employees who had not had pager overuse problems, and the third, his estranged wife, had left the OPD's employment and was using her own pager. The city argued that they should have been aware Quon had no expectation of privacy and that thus their exchanges with him would not be protected, either.

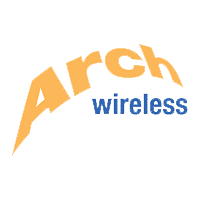
Arch Wireless logo

=== Trial ===
In 2003 Quon, his ex-wife, girlfriend (Note: The girlfriend, dispatcher April Florio, had been one of several in her position fired by the department following an investigation into the alleged use of their personal cell phones to tip off the boyfriend of one, a member of a local motorcycle gang suspected of drug trafficking.(Shaw, Jennifer Brown; Norfleet, Matthew J. (July 27, 2010). "Workplace Privacy and Text Messages: Quon v. Arch Wireless". San Francisco: Shaw Valenza LLP. Archived from the original on October 8, 2010.) She contested the dismissal and then successfully sued the city to recover her share of the hearing officer's costs.) and another officer, Steve Trujillo, sued the city, the department, the police chief and Arch in Central California U.S. district court, Eastern Division, in Riverside. (Note: In 2004 Quon and Trujillo were among nine Ontario officers who sued the city over a 1996 incident where they had been covertly videotaped undressing in the locker room as part of an investigation into the theft of a flashlight. The videotape had only come to light the previous year, and the San Bernardino County district attorney could not bring charges since the statute of limitations had expired. Quon, Trujillo and the other officers claimed they had been retaliated against due to their criticism of the tactics the department used.(Pugmire, Lance (October 29, 2004). "Ontario Officers File Suit Over Secret Locker-Room Taping" (PDF). Los Angeles Times.) In 2009 the city settled the suit for $2.75 million.("Significant Past Settlements and Verdicts". Hadsell, Stormer, Keeny, Richardson & Renick LLP. Archived from the original on May 15, 2009.. Quon, per his page at LinkedIn, left the OPD in 2005 and later trained police officers in Afghanistan for DynCorp, his present employer.) Judge Stephen G. Larson heard their claims of SCA violation, invasion of privacy and their constitutional protections against unreasonable search and seizure. Arch was granted summary judgment in its favor on the SCA claim since it was found to be a remote computing service, not subject to the statute's provisions.

The court ruled that Quon and his fellow plaintiffs had a reasonable expectation of privacy. It ordered a jury trial to determine whether the purpose of the audit was, as the department maintained, to find out whether it needed higher character limits or, as Quon claimed, to expose the personal nature of the texts. When the jury found in favor of the OPD, judgment was entered in favor of the defendants.

=== Appeal ===
On appeal in 2008, a panel of two Ninth Circuit judges, Kim McLane Wardlaw and Harry Pregerson, along with Western Washington district judge Ronald B. Leighton heard the case. Wardlaw, writing for all three, noted that "[t]he recently minted standard of electronic communication via e-mails, text messages, and other means opens a new frontier in Fourth Amendment jurisprudence that has been little explored". They agreed with the district court that Quon and his co-appellees had a reasonable expectation of privacy due to the assurances from Duke.

But they reversed since they found the search unreasonable as a matter of law. "The OPD surreptitiously reviewed messages that all parties reasonably believed were free from third-party review", Wardlaw wrote. The OPD could have obtained the information it sought in a number of less intrusive ways without viewing the content of the messages, such as warning Quon ahead of time or asking him to redact personal messages from an unreviewed transcript, she observed.

The ruling was applauded by online privacy advocates. The Electronic Frontier Foundation called it a "tremendous victory...the Fourth Amendment applies to your communications online just as strongly as it does to your letters and packages". Ars Technica said it "provide[d] an extensive space for workspace privacy". George Washington University law professor Orin Kerr, a Fourth Amendment scholar who was cited in the opinion, called it "a noteworthy holding that I think is correct and very important" at the Volokh Conspiracy blawg. It also overturned the summary judgment granted to Arch on the SCA claim, finding the company to be an electronic communications service and thus subject to stricter privacy requirements. The police chief was granted qualified immunity due to the lack of clearly established law in the area, while the city and department were denied their claim to statutory immunity. The SCA claims were remanded to district court.

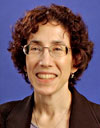
Judge Ikuta

The appellees petitioned for an en banc rehearing and were denied early in 2009. Six justices (Note: Carlos Bea, Consuelo Maria Callahan, Sandra Segal Ikuta, Andrew J. Kleinfeld, Diarmuid O'Scannlain, Norman Randy Smith, and Richard C. Tallman.) on the circuit dissented. Sandra Segal Ikuta, writing for them, criticized her colleague for two errors. Ikuta insisted the department's policy, and California's Public Records Act, mooted any discretionary interpretation of the policy that Duke may have conveyed to Quon, thus denying him a reasonable expectation of privacy. She also reminded Wardlaw that the Supreme Court had several times (Note: Specifically, she cited Skinner v. Railway Labor Executives Association (489 U.S. 602 (1990)), Vernonia School District 47J v. Acton (515 U.S. 646 (1995)) and Board of Education v. Earls (536 U.S. 822 (2002))) rejected the test on which she read Wardlaw's opinion relying on, that governments must use the least intrusive method of obtaining information available in order to protect employees' Fourth Amendment rights, a rule followed by seven other circuits as well.

Judge Wardlaw wrote a rare concurrence with the order, criticizing the dissent for ignoring the facts of the case. "[N]o poet ever interpreted nature as freely as Judge Ikuta interprets the record on this appeal", she said. As a matter of law, it was the dissenters, not her, who had ignored O'Connor: "By stripping public employees of all rights to privacy regardless of the actual operational realities of each workplace, the dissent would have us create a far broader rule than Supreme Court precedent allows. The majority of our court properly rejected the dissenting judge's efforts to do so."

=== Certiorari petition ===
Concurrent with the en banc petition, the appellees filed a certiorari petition to the Supreme Court, requesting it hear the case. They reiterated many of Ikuta's points, particularly her criticism of the panel's apparent adoption of the rejected least-intrusive-means test, and said it would be an "excellent vehicle" for revisiting O'Connor in light of new technology that complicated the workplace privacy issue. A month later the California State Association of Counties and the League of California Cities filed an amicus curiae brief in support of the petition making the same arguments, but in particular saying the opinion mischaracterized the operational realities of the case.

In opposition, Quon and the other respondents argued, as Wardlaw's concurrence had, that Ikuta and petitioners had greatly exaggerated the role that the less-intrusive-means test had played in the panel opinion, and that the facts of the case did not present any constitutional issues. In a reply brief, the petitioners noted that other commentators on the case agreed that it had mistakenly applied the less-intrusive-means test.

Late that year, the Supreme Court granted certiorari to the city, OPD and Chief Scharf, making the case into Ontario v. Quon. Kerr found this "an odd grant", since he had not expected the Supreme Court to find any issues making the case worth hearing. He suspected the justices were responding to a common issue with cases from the Ninth Circuit, where the minority of judges with politically conservative leanings had reacted vigorously to a perceived excess on the part of the circuit's dominant liberals. Oral arguments were scheduled for April, with a decision expected in June.

== Before the Court ==
The decision to hear Quon attracted attention from several quarters. It would be the first case touching on the workplace privacy rights of public employees since Von Raab, and raised the possibility that the Court would resolve the O'Connor conflict between Scalia's private-workplace standard and the plurality's "operational realities" consideration. It had not been an issue in the case, but Scalia was the only justice from that majority still on the court. New justice Sonia Sotomayor was expected to favor the city's side, since she had ruled for New York State's right to search an employee's computer in a similar case as a judge on the Second Circuit.

Electronic privacy advocates agreed with Wardlaw that the case was a "new frontier" for Fourth Amendment jurisprudence, since personal communications technology had advanced considerably since 1987, intertwining personal and work lives much more closely. It was expected that the court's ruling, though it would only directly affect government workplaces, would affect the private workplace as well.

Kerr told The New York Times that despite the novelty of the issue, he expected the resulting decision to be narrow due to the unusual circumstances from which the case arose. Elsewhere, he said the Court would be better off avoiding the question of whether the department violated the privacy of the people Quon was texting due to the lack of clear precedent for such a ruling with older technologies and the minimal treatment of the issue in the lower-court opinions.

=== Briefs ===
The parties' briefs reiterated their earlier arguments. "The City and Department should not be punished because a legitimate workplace search happened to turn up sexually explicit messages that plaintiffs need not and should not have sent on government-issued equipment in the first place", the city stated. The respondents urged the Court to use the case to adopt the O'Connor plurality's "operational realities" standard, and set forth a more extensive response to the pettioners' claim that the text messages' status as public records was fatal to any reasonable expectation of privacy by any correspondent.

Amici briefs were filed by several interested organizations for both sides. The city was joined by the federal government, represented by the Solicitor General's office, the National League of Cities and other organizations representing municipal and county governments and school-governance organizations led by the National School Boards Association. All believed their ability to function effectively as government bodies would be impeded if the Ninth Circuit was upheld. The Los Angeles Times and other media organizations also urged reversal on the grounds that the public interest was served by as broad a definition of public records as possible, particularly where police operations were concerned.

Weighing in on Quon's side was the AFL-CIO, on behalf of those members of its constituent labor unions who were public employees. The New York Intellectual Property Law Association (NYIPLA), whose members litigate privacy claims, called on the Court to refrain from setting down any clear rules as technology, and social expectations of privacy related to it, were still evolving. The Electronic Privacy Information Center's brief, signed by technical experts as well as lawyers, focused on the importance of data minimization to both security and privacy protection. The Electronic Frontier Foundation (EFF), American Civil Liberties Union, Center for Democracy and Technology and Public Citizen filed a joint brief. The conservative Rutherford Institute filed a motion requesting leave to file their amicus in favor of respondents since one withheld permission.

=== Oral argument ===
Oral arguments were heard on April 19, 2010. Kent Richland, the city's lawyer, who had previously argued before the justices on behalf of Anna Nicole Smith in Marshall v. Marshall, and Deputy Solicitor General Neal Katyal argued for petitioners; Dieter Dammeier, a former police officer himself, argued for Quon and the respondents.

Commentators, looking for signs as to how the Court would rule, felt the justices' questions suggested a narrow focus on the issue of whether the search was reasonable. Chief Justice John Roberts surprised some with his apparent strong sympathy for Quon's claims. Orin Kerr noted the many questions asked about how the pagers and other technologies work, and how that lack of familiarity reinforced, in his view, the need for caution, quoting from one of his own papers: "Judges who attempt to use the Fourth Amendment to craft broad regulatory rules covering new technologies run an unusually high risk of crafting rules based on incorrect assumptions of context and technological practice".

==== Petitioners ====
During Richland's argument, the justices inquired closely about the city's contention that Quon had no reasonable expectation of privacy over his text messages. Justice Sotomayor asked Richland about a hypothetical scenario in which a sergeant knew that various officers engaged in sexually explicit texting with romantic partners and decided to look at the transcripts out of sheer salacity. "Does that officer have any expectation of privacy that his boss won't just listen in out of prurient interest?" Richland answered that the motive of the examiner should not affect a privacy expectation. "[W]hen the filthy-minded police chief listens in, it's a very bad thing, but it's not—it's not offending your right of privacy," concluded Justice Antonin Scalia.

Justice Ruth Bader Ginsburg asked how the OPD could have examined the transcripts lawfully if the SCA forbade their release. Richland replied that the statute was complex and highly technical, and cited the Court's 1980 United States v. Payner to the effect that "a complicated law ... simply cannot be the basis for a reasonable expectation of privacy". He then turned over the rest of his time to Katyal.

During the Deputy Solicitor General's argument, another recent appointee, Justice Samuel Alito talked about the uncertainties of modern communications technology. "There isn't a well-established understanding about what is private and what isn't private. It's a little different from putting garbage out in front of your house, (Note: An allusion to the Court's holding in California v. Greenwood (486 U.S. 35 (1988)) that warrantless searches of garbage left out for pickup were not unreasonable and thus constitutional.) which has happened for a long time". After Katyal agreed that these things were "in flux" and thus the Court should avoid making any broadly applicable rules on the first hearing, Chief Justice John Roberts speculated that that principle cut both ways and that perhaps the Court should at least say the Constitution applied in this case and make rules later.

==== Respondents ====
When Dammeier argued for the respondents, Ginsburg and Breyer pressed him on why it was unreasonable for the department to review the content of the messages if it wanted to find out if it needed a higher character limit. The lawyer reiterated the jury's finding and said "they didn't need to do that". In response to further questioning from Breyer, he restated the other ways Judge Wardlaw had suggested the department could have obtained the information without reviewing the messages themselves. Justice Sotomayor was skeptical. "You're relying on the very person you're auditing to do the audit for you. That doesn't seem either practical or business-wise."

Justice John Paul Stevens brought up the issue of public review. His colleague Anthony Kennedy noted that attorneys challenging probable cause for a police raid would probably request the pager messages among other things, which Quon would certainly have been aware of, affecting his expectation of privacy. Dammeier responded that any mail he or anyone else sends would certainly be discoverable in litigation, but that possibility did not materially affect his expectation of privacy over it. He further reminded Scalia that in O'Connor the Court had found a reasonable expectation of privacy over the contents of a public employee's desk. Stevens pointed out that it was more likely that law enforcement communications would be reviewed by third parties than documents in doctors' desks. "I don't think we're taking away the government's ability to do searches under proper circumstances," Dammeier told him.

Dammeier addressed the SCA and Richland's argument that it was too complex to bear on the reasonableness of Quon's expectation of privacy. "It certainly may be not the end-all to the question, but it should be a factor in determining whether or not there’s going to be an expectation of privacy". Scalia said he had not been aware of the statute, and asked if it was reasonable to assume that Quon did. "Petitioners make an argument that because there is this California Public Records Act, that that may diminish one's expectation of privacy", Dammeier said. "Certainly, if we're going to have that, then we should also be having the Stored Communications Act."

The rest of Dammeier's argument was devoted to the issue of the other respondents' privacy expectations in communicating with Quon, after Sotomayor asked him if they could prevail even if Quon did not. Dammeier likened the department's actions to going to the post office to get letters sent to Quon instead of his house. Scalia pointed out that Quon could have obtained hard copies of the messages and circulated them himself. "[W]hen I get a piece of mail from somebody, I could do that as well", the lawyer replied, "but that doesn't mean that the government gets to go to the post office and get my mail before I get it". Richland replied in his rebuttal argument that "the truth is that all of these plaintiffs admitted that they knew that this was a department-issued pager, and this wasn't a post office".

== Decision ==
The Court handed down its decision in June, near the end of its term. Unanimously, the justices ruled for the city that the review of the texts had been a reasonable work-related search, discussing the difficulties raised by the broader issues involved and ultimately declining to rule on them. Kennedy wrote the majority opinion; Scalia and Stevens added concurrences of their own.

=== Majority ===
Kennedy began by setting forth the facts of the case, its legal history and the relevant laws and precedent. In the opinion's third section, he cautiously considered the question of Quon's privacy expectation. "The judiciary risks error by elaborating too fully on the Fourth Amendment implications of emerging technology before its role in society has become clear," he observed, referencing the Court's Olmstead v. United States decision in 1928, in which it had permitted warrantless wiretapping on the grounds that the wiretaps did not actually enter the property of the bootleggers under investigation, and the Katz v. United States decision which overruled it four decades later.

In that latter case, he wrote, the Court had the "knowledge and experience" to conclude that there was a reasonable expectation of privacy in a telephone booth. "It is not so clear that courts at present are on so sure a ground". He elaborated on these uncertainties, referring to the amici briefs filed by the EFF and NYIPLA:

Prudence counsels caution before the facts in the instant case are used to establish far-reaching premises that define the existence, and extent, of privacy expectations enjoyed by employees when using employer-provided communication devices.

Rapid changes in the dynamics of communication and information transmission are evident not just in the technology itself but in what society accepts as proper behavior. As one amici brief notes, many employers expect or at least tolerate personal use of such equipment by employees because it often increases worker efficiency. At present, it is uncertain how workplace norms, and the law's treatment of them, will evolve.

Even if the Court were certain that the O'Connor plurality's approach were the right one, the Court would have difficulty predicting how employees' privacy expectations will be shaped by those changes or the degree to which society will be prepared to recognize those expectations as reasonable.

For instance, he noted that the ready availability of cell phones made them potentially "necessary instruments for self-expression, even self-identification", strengthening a privacy claim. But at the same time they were affordable enough that anyone wanting one for such a purpose could buy their own rather than use one provided by an employer

"A broad holding concerning employees' privacy expectations vis-à-vis employer-provided technological equipment might have implications for future cases that cannot be predicted," Kennedy wrote. "It is preferable to dispose of this case on narrower grounds." He accepted, for argument's sake, three points: that Quon had a reasonable expectation of privacy in his pager messages, that the review of them constituted a search and that the same principles governing a physical search of a public employee's workspace applied to electronic privacy.

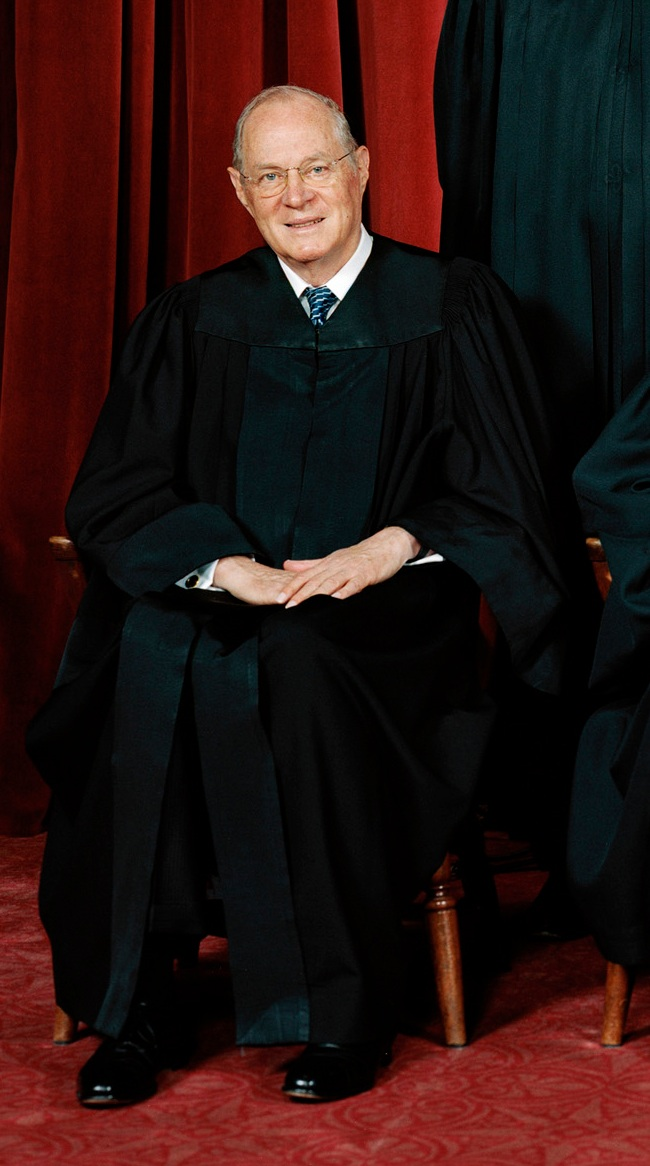
Justice Kennedy

On those grounds, the search had been reasonable under O'Connor. Its inception, to see whether the city needed a higher character limit, was legitimately work-related. Review of the content of the messages was an "efficient and expedient" way of achieving that goal, Kennedy wrote. The OPD's decision to limit the review to just two months' worth of messages, and redact those sent when Quon was off duty further bolstered its case.

While Quon could have had some expectation of privacy, Kennedy continued, it could not have been enough to prevent a review of the messages. Not only had he been told of the possibility of an audit, but as a police officer "he would or should have known that his actions were likely to come under legal scrutiny, and that this might entail an analysis of his on-the-job communications". And, in particular, since the city had purchased pagers for SWAT team members to improve their performance in that capacity, it was reasonable to expect that the city might audit those pagers to assess the performance of both the units and the pagers in SWAT situations.

Citing the same precedent cases that Ikuta had in her dissent from the rehearing denial, Kennedy said the Ninth Circuit erred in suggesting less intrusive means would have yielded the same information. After quoting from those cases to the effect that the text was not required and that letting judges apply it would make effective investigations almost impossible, he concluded that "[e]ven assuming there were ways that OPD could have performed the search that would have been less intrusive, it does not follow that the search as conducted was unreasonable."

He could not find any legal authority or precedent for the respondents' argument that the SCA violation, which was not before the Court, rendered the search per se unconstitutional. To the contrary, he pointed to the Virginia v. Moore case decided the previous term, in which evidence from a search conducted after an illegal arrest was ruled admissible since statutory violations did not inherently constitute Fourth Amendment violations. Nor would an SCA violation have rendered the actions of petitioners unconstitutional since they themselves did not violate it. "The otherwise reasonable search by OPD is not rendered unreasonable by the assumption that Arch Wireless violated the SCA by turning over the transcripts".

Lastly, he ruled that the other respondents beside Quon had not suffered a violation of their privacy. The respondents had, Kennedy wrote, simply argued that a violation of Quon's privacy necessarily violated that of those he exchanged messages with, and did not make a case that they could have suffered a violation even if Quon had not. Since the Court had found that Quon's Fourth Amendment rights were not violated, it therefore had to hold that the others' were not, either.

=== Concurrences ===
Stevens' brief concurrence approved of the Court's decision not to resolve the split in standards left by O'Connor. He noted that the facts of the case argued more strongly for the standard proposed by Justice Harry Blackmun in his dissent, which Stevens had joined. Blackmun had said the justices should adopt neither the plurality's "operational realities" standard nor Scalia's reasonable-in-the-private-sector alternative, but instead consider the circumstances of each particular search. In this case, he reiterated his line of reasoning from oral argument, that Quon's position as a police officer would have seriously limited his expectation of privacy.

Scalia, too, began by addressing O'Connor. The intervening years had not changed his position that the plurality's position in that case was "standardless and unsupported." Nor, a footnote responding to Stevens added, was the approach of that case's dissent relevant unless it was overruled at some point. Applying the test from his concurrence in that case to the instant case, he wrote, "the proper threshold inquiry should be not whether the Fourth Amendment applies to messages on public employees' employer-issued pagers, but whether it applies in general to such messages on employer-issued pagers". But it was unnecessary to answer that question since he agreed with the majority that the search had been reasonable.

Since, he felt, that was all the Court needed to say, the majority's "excursus on the complexity and consequences of answering ... that admittedly irrelevant threshold question" was similarly a waste of effort. "To whom do we owe an additional explanation for declining to decide an issue, once we have explained that it makes no difference?" He then excoriated the majority's "exaggerated" case for restraint:

Applying the Fourth Amendment to new technologies may sometimes be difficult, but when it is necessary to decide a case we have no choice. The Court's implication ... that where electronic privacy is concerned we should decide less than we otherwise would (that is, less than the principle of law necessary to resolve the case and guide private action)—or that we should hedge our bets by concocting case-specific standards or issuing opaque opinions—is in my view indefensible. The-times-they-are-a-changin' is a feeble excuse for disregard of duty.

It was "a heavy-handed hint" to lower courts and future litigants that was likely to encourage even more such suits in the future. "In short, in saying why it is not saying more, the Court says much more than it should."

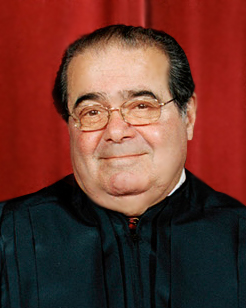
Justice Scalia

Lastly, he found it ironic that the Court had relied on the plurality standard in O'Connor, since its discussion would make it even harder to assess what the operating realities of the workplace were. "Any rule that requires evaluating whether a given gadget is a 'necessary instrumen[t] for self-expression, even self-identification,' on top of assessing the degree to which 'the law's treatment of [workplace norms has] evolve[d],' ... is (to put it mildly) unlikely to yield objective answers."

== Reaction ==
Commentary on the decision focused on the broader issues the Court did not decide. An editorial in The New York Times praised the majority's restraint. "Holding off from making broad pronouncements in the midst of a rapidly changing technology environment is a wise display of restraint by the court," agreed The Washington Post three weeks later. The EFF likewise praised the limited scope of the decision and found "hopeful hints" in Kennedy's explanation of the cautious approach suggesting that the Court would "cautiously make such decisions based on society's privacy expectations and its level of reliance on new communications technologies". It called on Congress to pass proposed legislation that addressed these issues.

EPIC president Marc Rotenberg was dismayed by the Court's caution. "[T]he court could have done what it has done in the past and updated constitutional safeguards in light of new technology", as it did in Katz, he said in a letter responding to the Times editorial. That case had influenced privacy law internationally, and "the court's reluctance to assess these privacy issues also means that it will have less influence on other high courts that address similar questions".

== Subsequent jurisprudence ==
Scalia's criticism was echoed by Eleventh Circuit judge Frank M. Hull in a case reheard to take Quon into account. In March 2010, she had written for a panel deciding Rehberg v. Paulk, a case in which a Georgia man had sued the Dougherty County district attorney alleging malicious prosecution for an investigation into harassing faxes sent to a local hospital. Rehberg had also claimed his privacy was violated by his Internet service provider's release of his emails from its server in response to a subpoena.

No appeals court had yet been called upon to decide whether users had a reasonable expectation of privacy over the content of email. Hull's opinion extrapolated from older precedents on postal and telephone communications, along with more recent cases from district courts and a Tenth Circuit ruling on email addresses, to assert that there was no reasonable expectation of privacy over email content once it reached a third-party server, since it was transmitted from there to other servers and copied and archived along the way. There was at the time no settled law on the subject, and privacy advocates expressed concern and criticized the decision. After Quon, the panel granted rehearing.

The new decision, handed down a month after Quon, followed it in declining to establish a precedent. "The Supreme Court's more-recent precedent shows a marked lack of clarity in what privacy expectations as to content of electronic communications are reasonable...Given the lack of precedent, we now question whether it would be prudent in this case and on this limited factual record to establish broad precedent as to the reasonable privacy expectation in email content". The panel thus limited its decision to finding for the appellees on qualified immunity grounds.

The criticism from within and without led to an article by New York Times Supreme Court reporter Adam Liptak finding Quon emblematic of two trends observers found increasingly problematic in Roberts Court opinions: vagueness, and apparent unanimity undermined by multiple concurring opinions. It had been among the record 77% of unanimous decisions from the term with at least one concurrence; as for the former issue, he characterized Hull's description of Quon as calling it "almost aggressively unhelpful to lawyers and judges".

== Analysis and commentary ==
A Harvard Law Review article criticized the decision, concurring with Scalia and Hull that it provided "no helpful guidance" to lower courts in resolving similar cases. "[I]ts reluctance to devise an intelligible principle for Fourth Amendment rights regarding technology will have the negative effect of causing lower courts to rely on O'Connor to an even greater extent, [allowing] judges...to reach whatever conclusion they want. The Court should have ruled that public employees do not enjoy a reasonable expectation of privacy when sending text messages from government-issued devices."

The article noted the irony of Kennedy's musings about the difficulty of crafting privacy standards with technology evolving at a rapid pace when applied to a case that turned on text messages sent on "two-way pager devices that were issued to employees a decade ago and that would likely be deemed antiquated by today's teenagers and young professionals", who largely tend to use cell phones for texting. "Presumably, societal norms with respect to pagers are as developed as they will ever be." Nor could it see work-related employer-issued pagers or other devices being used for self-expressive purposes as Kennedy suggested, since they were functionally no different from any other such item a police department might issue to officers, "much like a police officer's patrol cruiser or sidearm". It did concede that the conflict between the department's written policy and Lt. Duke's verbal assurances to Quon made the issue more complex in this particular case.

The Court's apparent suggestion that "any technology can be seen as emerging", the Review suggested, would not only lead to muddled future jurisprudence, but was in contrast to various lower courts' more successful efforts to do so. (Note: Specifically, it cited Biby v. Board of Regents (419 F.3d 845 (8th Cir. 2005), in which a public university's written policy was held to foreclose any expectation of privacy on employee's computers, and United States v. Simons (29 F.Supp. 2d 324 (E.D. Va. 1998), where it was held that actual office policies and procedures may reduce a public employee's privacy expectations over their desks, files and computers.) "While it may be true that technological advances and the increased availability of advanced mobile handsets to individual consumers have blurred the line between private life and the workplace", the article concluded, "it does not necessarily follow that a user has a reasonable expectation of privacy on workplace equipment provided by the employer". As Kennedy had also noted, the proliferation of personal communications devices could make workers more respectful of those distinctions. The Review cited as an example the widespread use of email from work computers.

Another commentator took it upon herself to address the issues the Court left unresolved, even before it had heard oral arguments. "Because this holding is so limited, it practically begs for a new case to address the issue more broadly", wrote Amanda Higgins of the Ninth Circuit's opinions, in the Oklahoma Journal of Law and Technology. She agreed with Ikuta's criticism of the panel decision, but argued that the panel should have devoted more attention to the larger issues of Quon's expectation of privacy. "To focus the analysis elsewhere is less than helpful in this already murky area of law".

The jury's finding that the audit was legitimately work-related and not an investigation of misconduct may ultimately have hurt the city, Higgins wrote, since it focused attention on whether it was necessary to read the messages. Had it been found to be investigatory, there would have been more grounds to rule the audit a reasonable search. Other public employers facing similar litigation "will want to get on the court record that their search was for some purpose that will not only pass as reasonable at its inception under the facts of the case...and will also allow the court to find that the actual method was not excessive in relation to the purpose". They would be best served, she concluded, by making clear, explicit policies on personal use of communications devices and rigorously enforcing those policies. Informal policies in partial or complete conflict with formal ones had created problems for employers in other areas of the law, and it was better to prevent such lawsuits from arising altogether.

== See also ==
- Riley v. California, 2014 Supreme Court holding that searches of the digital contents of a cell phone require a warrant
