= Marcus Thornton =

Marcus Thornton may refer to:

- Marcus Thornton (basketball, born 1987), American professional basketball player, drafted by the Miami Heat; played for LSU (2007–2009) in college
- Marcus Thornton (basketball, born 1992), American basketball player; undrafted; played for Georgia (2010–2015) in college
- Marcus Thornton (basketball, born 1993), American professional basketball player, drafted by the Boston Celtics; played for William & Mary (2011–2015) in college
- Marcus Thornton, petitioner in the United States Supreme Court case Thornton v. United States, 541 U.S. 615 (2004)
