= United States v. Robinson =

- Supreme Court of the United States

Argued October 9, 1973 Decided December 11, 1973
- Full case name: United States v. Willie Robinson, Jr.
- Citations: 414 U.S. 218 (more) 94 S. Ct. 467; 38 L. Ed. 2d 427

Case history
- Prior: 471 F.2d 1082 (D.C. Cir. 1973)

Holding
- In the case of a lawful custodial arrest, a full search of the person is not only an exception to the warrant requirement of the Fourth Amendment, but is also a "reasonable" search under that Amendment.

Court membership
- Chief Justice Warren E. Burger Associate Justices William O. Douglas · William J. Brennan Jr. Potter Stewart · Byron White; Thurgood Marshall · Harry Blackmun; Lewis F. Powell Jr. · William Rehnquist

Case opinions
- Majority: Rehnquist, joined by Burger, Stewart, White, Blackmun, Powell
- Concurrence: Powell
- Dissent: Marshall, joined by Douglas, Brennan

United States v. Robinson, 414 U.S. 218 (1973), was a case in which the United States Supreme Court held that "in the case of a lawful custodial arrest a full search of the person is not only an exception to the warrant requirement of the Fourth Amendment, but is also a reasonable search under that Amendment."

== Facts ==
A Washington, D.C. police officer stopped a 1965 Cadillac based on reliable information that the driver's operating license had been revoked. All three occupants exited the car, and the officer arrested the driver, Robinson. (For purposes of the Court's opinion, it was assumed that Robinson's full-custody arrest was valid, although there was some concern that the stop was pretextual.) The officer searched Robinson and felt a package in his coat. Upon removing the package, a crumpled cigarette packet, and opening it, the officer discovered "14 gelatin capsules of white powder" that were found to be heroin.

== Issue ==
Did the officer's search of the defendant violate the Fourth Amendment?

== Holding ==
The Court ruled 6–3 in favor of the government, holding: "In the case of a lawful custodial arrest a full search of the person is not only an exception to the warrant requirement of the Fourth Amendment, but is also a 'reasonable' search under that Amendment."

Justice Thurgood Marshall's dissenting opinion explained: "The majority's approach represents a clear and marked departure from our long tradition of case-by-case adjudication of the reasonableness of searches and seizures under the Fourth Amendment."

The ruling reaffirmed the Court's holdings in the cases of Harris v. United States (1947) and Chimel v. California (1969) that officers do not violate an arrestee's Fourth Amendment rights when a search is performed of the person and his immediate effects, regardless of the offense of arrest.

== See also ==
- Chimel v. California (1969)
- Virginia v. Moore (2008)
- Arizona v. Gant (2009)
- People v. Diaz (2011)
