= Orin Kerr =

American legal scholar (born 1971)

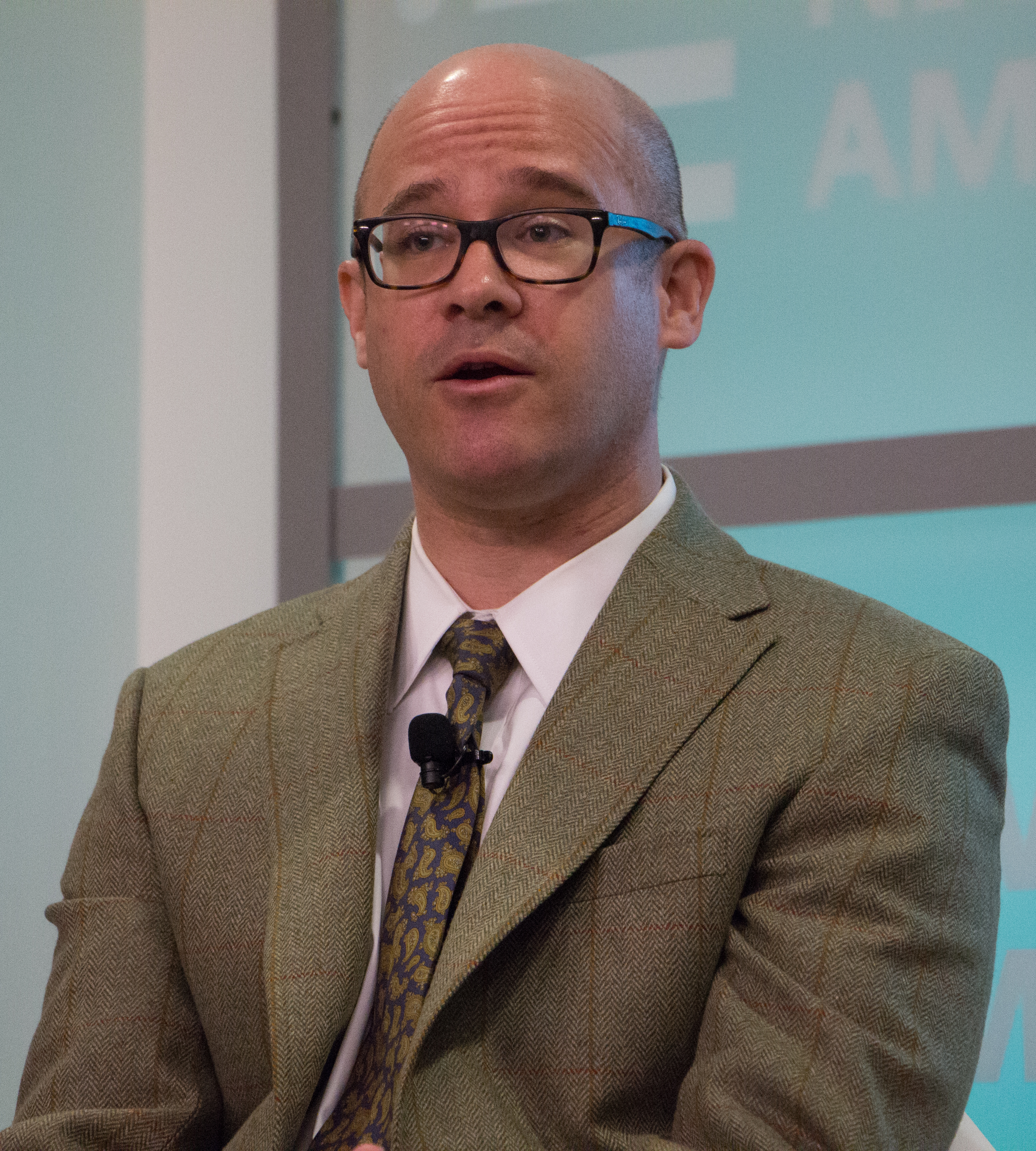
- Kerr in 2016
- Born: Orin Samuel Kerr; June 2, 1971 (age 55); New York, U.S.
- Spouse: Ainsley Fuhr (m. 2012)
- Relatives: Grace Borgenicht Brandt (grandmother)

Academic background
- Education: Princeton University (BSE); Stanford University (MS); Harvard University (JD)

Academic work
- Discipline: Cybercrime

Orin Samuel Kerr (born June 2, 1971) is an American legal scholar known for his studies of American criminal procedure and the Fourth Amendment to the United States Constitution, as well as computer crime law and internet surveillance. He has been a professor of law at Stanford Law School since 2025. Kerr is one of the contributors to the law-oriented blog titled The Volokh Conspiracy.

== Early life and education ==
Kerr was born in 1971 in New York. His father, Arnold D. Kerr (born Aronek Kierszkowski; 1928–2012), was a Polish Jew who was the only member of his family to survive the Holocaust; he immigrated to the United States in 1954 and became a professor of civil engineering at New York University and the University of Delaware.

After graduating from Tower Hill School in Wilmington, Delaware, in 1989, Kerr studied mechanical engineering and aerospace engineering at Princeton University, graduating in 1993 with a Bachelor of Science in Engineering, magna cum laude. He then did graduate study in mechanical engineering at Stanford University, where he received a Master of Science degree in 1994. Kerr then attended Harvard Law School, where he was an executive editor of the Harvard Journal of Law and Public Policy and an editor of the Harvard Journal of Law & Technology. He graduated in 1997 with a Juris Doctor, magna cum laude.

== Career ==
Kerr was a law clerk for Judge Leonard I. Garth of the U.S. Court of Appeals for the Third Circuit from 1997 to 1998. From 1998 to 2001, he was a trial attorney in the Computer Crime and Intellectual Property Section of the U.S. Department of Justice's Criminal Division. In 2001, he joined the faculty of George Washington University Law School.

In 2003, Kerr took a leave of absence from the law school to clerk for Justice Anthony M. Kennedy of the United States Supreme Court during October Term 2003. In 2009, he served U.S. Senator John Cornyn of the Senate Judiciary Committee as Special Counsel for Supreme Court Nominations during Sonia Sotomayor's confirmation as Supreme Court Justice; a year later, he again served as an advisor to Cornyn, this time on the Supreme Court confirmation of Elena Kagan.

Kerr was one of the lawyers for alleged MySpace "cyberbully" Lori Drew. His blog contributions at The Volokh Conspiracy often focus on developments in internet privacy law. He has been regarded as a leading scholar on Fourth Amendment jurisprudence in electronic communications and surveillance. Kerr was repeatedly cited in the Ninth Circuit's 2008 opinion Quon v. Arch Wireless Operating Co., Inc., which held that users have a reasonable expectation of privacy in the content of text messages and e-mails. The Supreme Court later took up the case, as Ontario v. Quon, and unanimously reversed. Kerr argued before the Supreme Court in the 2011 case Davis v. United States.

In response to a 2011 comment by Chief Justice John Roberts criticizing the irrelevancy of legal scholarship for focusing on issues such as Immanuel Kant's influence on 18th century evidentiary approaches in Bulgaria, Kerr wrote a short, humorous paper on the topic in 2015, finding that such influence was highly improbable.

=== Academia ===
In 2012, he was appointed to a position as a scholar-in-residence at the Library of Congress; the two-year part-time position focused on information technology, privacy, and criminal justice. In 2018, Kerr joined the faculty of the USC Gould School of Law. In 2019, Kerr joined the faculty of the UC Berkeley School of Law. Then in 2025 Kerr joined the faculty of Stanford Law School. He is a senior fellow at the Hoover Institution.

== Selected works ==
=== Articles ===
- Kerr, Orin S. (2003). "Internet Surveillance After the USA Patriot Act: The Big Brother That Isn't". Northwestern University Law Review. 97 (2): 607–74. SSRN 317501.
- — (2003). "Cybercrime's Scope: Interpreting Access and Authorization in Computer Misuse Statutes". New York University Law Review. 78 (5): 1596–1668.
- — (2004). "The Fourth Amendment and New Technologies: Constitutional Myths and the Case for Caution". Michigan Law Review. 102 (5): 801–88. doi:10.2307/4141982. JSTOR 4141982.
- — (2004). "A User's Guide to the Stored Communications Act, and a Legislator's Guide to Amending It". George Washington University Law Review. 72 (6): 1208–43. SSRN 421860.
- — (2005). "Searches and Seizures in a Digital World". Harvard Law Review. 119 (2): 531–68. JSTOR 4093493. SSRN 697541.
- — (2007). "Four Models of Fourth Amendment Protection" (PDF). Stanford Law Review. 60 (2): 503–52.
- — (2009). "The Case for the Third-Party Doctrine". Michigan Law Review. 107 (4): 561–602. JSTOR 40379829.
- — (2011). "An Equilibrium-Adjustment Theory of the Fourth Amendment". Harvard Law Review. 125 (2): 476–543.
- — (2012). "The Mosaic Theory of the Fourth Amendment". Michigan Law Review. 111 (3): 311–54.
- — (2015). "Katz Has Only One Step: The Irrelevance of Subjective Expectations". University of Chicago Law Review. 82 (1): 113–34.
- — (2016). "Norms of Computer Trespass". Columbia Law Review. 116 (4): 1143–84.

== See also ==
- List of law clerks for the first seat of the Supreme Court of the United States
