= Virginia v. Moore =

- Supreme Court of the United States

Argued January 14, 2008 Decided April 23, 2008
- Full case name: Virginia, Petitioner v. David Lee Moore
- Docket no.: 06-1082
- Citations: 553 U.S. 164 (more) 128 S. Ct. 1598; 170 L. Ed. 2d 559; 2008 U.S. LEXIS 3674; 76 U.S.L.W. 4237; 21 Fla. L. Weekly Fed. S 195

Case history
- Prior: Convicted, Portsmouth, Va circuit court (2003); rev'd, 609 S.E.2d 74 (Va. App. 2005); aff'd en banc, 622 S.E.2d 253 (Va. App. 2005); rev'd 636 S.E.2d 395 ( Va. S.C. 2006); cert. granted, 551 U.S. __ (2007).

Holding
- A warrantless arrest for driving with a suspended license was reasonable under the Fourth Amendment even though the arrest was not permitted under state law, so the fruits of the search incident to that arrest were admissible.

Court membership
- Chief Justice John Roberts Associate Justices John P. Stevens · Antonin Scalia; Anthony Kennedy · David Souter; Clarence Thomas · Ruth Bader Ginsburg; Stephen Breyer · Samuel Alito

Case opinions
- Majority: Scalia, joined by Roberts, Stevens, Kennedy, Souter, Thomas, Breyer, Alito
- Concurrence: Ginsburg (in judgment)

Laws applied
- U.S. Const. amend. IV, Va. Code Ann. § 19.2-74

Virginia v. Moore, 553 U.S. 164 (2008), is a Supreme Court of the United States case that addresses use of evidence obtained by police in a search incident to an arrest if that arrest is later found to be unlawful. The arrest was unlawful because it was not permitted by state law. However, the Supreme Court held that the arrest was reasonable under the Fourth Amendment; thus, the exclusionary rule did not apply.

== Background ==
Two Portsmouth, Virginia police officers had probable cause to suspect that David Lee Moore was driving with a suspended license. Virginia state code authorizes the police to give a summons to, but not arrest, someone who is driving with a suspended license. The police, however, arrested Moore, and in a search subsequent to the arrest he was found to be carrying crack cocaine. At trial, Moore contested the state's use of the cocaine as evidence, arguing that the arrest, and therefore the search, was a violation of his rights under the Fourth Amendment to the United States Constitution.

== Opinion of the Court ==
The Court decided unanimously in favor of Virginia. In an opinion by Justice Antonin Scalia that was joined by seven justices, the Court held that because the Fourth Amendment was not written with the intent to incorporate individual states' arrest statutes and because the arrest was based on probable cause, Moore had no constitutional grounds to have the evidence suppressed.

Justice Ruth Bader Ginsburg authored a separate concurring opinion, asserting that there was less precedent supporting the majority opinion than Justice Scalia suggested. Her main rationale for aligning with the other eight justices was based on the observation that although Moore's arrest violated state law, the Virginia statute did not specify the suppression of evidence as a consequence of this violation.

== See also ==
- Knowles v. Iowa
