= Riley v. California =

Riley v. California U.S. v. Wurie
- Supreme Court of the United States

Argued April 29, 2014 Decided June 25, 2014
- Full case name: David Leon Riley, Petitioner v. California; United States, Petitioner v. Brima Wurie
- Docket nos.: 13-132; 13-212
- Citations: 573 U.S. 373 (more) 134 S. Ct. 2473; 189 L. Ed. 2d 430
- Decision: Opinion

Case history
- Prior: People v. Riley, No. D059840, 2013 Cal App Unpub Lexis 1033, 2013 WL 475242 (Cal. App. 4th Dist. Feb. 08, 2013); cert. granted, 71 U.S. 1161 (2014).; United States v. Wurie, 612 F. Supp. 2d 104 (D. Mass. 2009); reversed, 728 F.3d 1 (1st Cir. 2013); cert. granted, 71 U.S. 1161 (2014).

Holding
- Police generally may not, without a warrant, search digital information on a cell phone seized from an individual who has been arrested.

Court membership
- Chief Justice John Roberts Associate Justices Antonin Scalia · Anthony Kennedy; Clarence Thomas · Ruth Bader Ginsburg; Stephen Breyer · Samuel Alito; Sonia Sotomayor · Elena Kagan

Case opinions
- Majority: Roberts, joined by Scalia, Kennedy, Thomas, Ginsburg, Breyer, Sotomayor, Kagan
- Concurrence: Alito (in part and in the judgment)

Laws applied
- U.S. Const. amend. IV
- This case overturned a previous ruling or rulings
- People v. Diaz (Cal. 2011)

Riley v. California, 573 U.S. 373 (2014), is a landmark United States Supreme Court case in which the court ruled that the warrantless search and seizure of the digital contents of a cell phone during an arrest is unconstitutional under the Fourth Amendment.

The case arose from inconsistent rulings on cell phone searches from various state and federal courts. The Fourth, Fifth, and Seventh Circuits had ruled that police officers can search cell phones incident to arrest under various standards. That rule was also accepted by the state supreme courts of Georgia, Massachusetts, and California. On the other hand, the First Circuit and the state supreme courts of Florida and Ohio disagreed and ruled that police needed a warrant to search the information on a suspect's phone. California had also proposed a state statute requiring police to obtain a warrant before searching the contents of "portable electronic devices".

The U.S. Supreme Court took the Riley case in order to address these inconsistencies at the lower courts. Riley has been widely praised as “a sweeping victory for privacy rights” with legal scholars describing the decision as "the privacy gift that keeps on giving."

== Background ==
=== Supreme Court precedent ===
In Chimel v. California (1969), the Supreme Court ruled that if the police arrest someone, they may search the body of the person without a warrant and "the area into which he might reach" in order to protect material evidence or for the officers' safety. That ruling served as confirmation of the notion that police may search a suspect, and the area immediately surrounding that person, without a warrant during a lawful arrest in accordance with the search incident to arrest doctrine.

Before the Riley case, the Supreme Court had explored variations on the Chimel theme, considering police searches of various items individuals had close at hand when arrested, and the court was prepared to look into the seizure of cell phones when incident to arrest. Lower courts were in dispute on whether the Fourth Amendment allows the police to search the digital contents of such a phone, without first getting a warrant.

Stanford University law professor Jeffrey L. Fisher, who represented Riley in court, explained in a media interview that at least six courts held that the Fourth Amendment permits searches of this type, but that three courts did not. Therefore, a definitive Supreme Court precedent was needed. Fisher opined that there are "very, very profound problems with searching a smartphone without a warrant" and that it was like giving "police officers authority to search through the private papers and the drawers and bureaus and cabinets of somebody's house." Fisher warned that it could open up "every American's entire life to the police department, not just at the scene but later at the station house and downloaded into their computer forever".

=== Arrest of David Leon Riley ===
David Leon Riley was pulled over in San Diego, California in 2009 for expired registration tags on his vehicle. The police officer then found that Riley was driving with a suspended driver's license. The San Diego Police Department's policy at the time was to impound a vehicle after stopping a driver with a suspended license in order to prevent them from driving again. Additionally, department policy required officers to perform an inventory search of the vehicle, which in Riley's case led to the discovery of two handguns under the hood of his vehicle.

Later ballistic testing confirmed that the handguns were the weapons used in a gang-related murder that had taken place a few weeks previously, for which Riley had been a suspect. Because of the discovery of the concealed and loaded handguns, along with gang paraphernalia, during the vehicle search, police placed Riley under arrest and searched his cell phone without a warrant.

The cell phone search yielded information indicating that Riley was a member of the Lincoln Park gang; evidence included pictures, cell phone contacts, text messages, and video clips. Included in the photos was a picture of a different vehicle that Riley owned, which was also the vehicle involved in the gang shooting. Based in part on the pictures and videos recovered from the cell phone, police charged Riley in connection with the gang shooting.

Riley moved to suppress the cell phone evidence at his criminal trial, but the judge permitted the evidence to be included. Ultimately, Riley was convicted and the California Court of Appeal affirmed the verdict. That court ruled that the search incident to arrest doctrine permits police to conduct a full exploratory search of a cell phone (even if the search is conducted later and at a different location) whenever the phone is found near the suspect at the time of arrest. Riley then appealed that ruling to the U.S. Supreme Court.

=== Arrest of Brima Wurie ===
Brima Wurie was arrested in Boston, Massachusetts in 2007 after police observed him participating in an apparent drug sale. Officers seized two cell phones from Wurie's person, and noticed that one of them was receiving multiple calls from a source identified as “my house” on the phone's screen. The officers opened the phone, accessed its call log, determined the number associated with the “my house” label, and traced that number to what they suspected was Wurie's apartment. They then secured a search warrant for Wurie's apartment and, during the ensuing search, found crack cocaine, marijuana, drug paraphernalia, a firearm, ammunition, and cash.

Wurie was subsequently charged with drug and firearm offenses and placed on trial. He moved to suppress the evidence obtained from the search of his apartment, but the trial court denied the motion and Wurie was convicted. Wurie appealed to the First Circuit Court of Appeals, which reversed the lower court's decision on the use of phone-related evidence at his trial. The Circuit Court held that cell phones are distinct from other physical possessions that may be searched incident to arrest without a warrant, because of the amount of personal data cell phones contain and the negligible threat they pose to law enforcement interests. Massachusetts prosecutors appealed this ruling to the U.S. Supreme Court.

== Opinion of the court ==
The case of Riley v. California as heard before the Supreme Court combined two cases: Riley's case and United States v. Wurie. Riley argued that the digital contents of a smartphone do not threaten the safety of police officers, and that searches for which officers only have a belief that they may find evidence of a crime violate constitutional rights.

=== Majority opinion ===
This consolidated opinion addressed the appeals by both Riley and Wurie due to the similar questions raised. Chief Justice John Roberts delivered the opinion of the court, concluding that a warrant is required to search a mobile phone. Roberts wrote that when police search a suspect's phone without a warrant, they violate the warrantless search test established in Chimel v. California:

Digital data stored on a cell phone cannot itself be used as a weapon to harm an arresting officer or to effectuate the arrestee's escape. Law enforcement officers remain free to examine the physical aspects of a phone to ensure that it will not be used as a weapon--say, to determine whether there is a razor blade hidden between the phone and its case. Once an officer has secured a phone and eliminated any potential physical threats, however, data on the phone can endanger no one.

Although possible evidence stored on a phone may be destroyed with either remote wiping or data encryption, Roberts emphasized "the ordinary operation of a phone's security features, apart from any active attempt by a defendant or his associates to conceal or destroy evidence upon arrest." He then argued that a warrantless search is unlikely to make much of a difference. Furthermore, Roberts argued that cell phones differ from other objects in a person's pocket:

Modern cell phones are not just another technological convenience. With all they contain and all they may reveal, they hold for many Americans “the privacies of life". The fact that technology now allows an individual to carry such information in his hand does not make the information any less worthy of the protection for which the Founders fought.

=== Concurring opinion ===
Justice Samuel Alito wrote an opinion concurring in the judgment, noting that "we should not mechanically apply the rule used in the predigital era to the search of a cell phone. Many cell phones now in use are capable of storing and accessing a quantity of information, some highly personal, that no person would ever have had on his person in hard-copy form."

However, in trying to find a balance between law enforcement and privacy issues, Alito expressed concern that the majority opinion would create anomalies: "Under established law, police may seize and examine [hard copies of information] in the wallet without obtaining a warrant, but under the Court's holding today, the information stored in the cell phone is out." Alito further suggested that Congress or state legislatures may need to consider new laws that draw "reasonable distinctions based on categories of information or perhaps other variables," otherwise "it would be very unfortunate if privacy protection in the 21st century were left primarily to the federal courts using the blunt instrument of the Fourth Amendment."

== Impact ==
The Supreme Court's ruling in Riley v. California was generally praised for addressing the challenges presented by new technologies, but with mixed reviews concerning its impact on privacy law and police procedure. Some commentators believed that the ruling allowed courts to adapt older search warrant rules for modern behaviors in which people store great amounts of private information on their phones; though others found the ruling to be too narrow and focused only on the types of flip phones and smart phones used during that time period, thus creating an uncertain precedent for future technological developments. Therefore, the ruling may be more useful for matters of police procedure rather than privacy.

== See also ==
- List of United States Supreme Court cases, volume 573
