= Knowles v. Iowa =

- Supreme Court of the United States

Argued November 3, 1998 Decided December 8, 1998
- Full case name: Patrick Knowles, Petitioner v. Iowa
- Citations: 525 U.S. 113 (more) 119 S. Ct. 484; 142 L. Ed. 2d 492; 1998 U.S. LEXIS 8068; 67 U.S.L.W. 4027; 98 Daily Journal DAR 12417; 1998 Colo. J. C.A.R. 6164

Case history
- Prior: Conviction affirmed, State v. Knowles, 569 N.W.2d 601 (Iowa 1997); cert. granted, 523 U.S. 1019 (1998).

Holding
- A police officer may not conduct a warrantless search of a person incident to arrest based on issuing that person a citation rather than arresting them.

Court membership
- Chief Justice William Rehnquist Associate Justices John P. Stevens · Sandra Day O'Connor; Antonin Scalia · Anthony Kennedy; David Souter · Clarence Thomas; Ruth Bader Ginsburg · Stephen Breyer

Case opinion
- Majority: Rehnquist, joined by unanimous

Laws applied
- Iowa Code §321.485(1)(a); U.S. Const. amend. IV

Knowles v. Iowa, 525 U.S. 113 (1998), was a decision by the United States Supreme Court which ruled that the Fourth Amendment prohibits a police officer from further searching a vehicle which was stopped for a minor traffic offense once the officer has written a citation for the offense.

== Background ==
Patrick Knowles was stopped in Newton, Iowa, driving 43 mph (69 km/h) in a 25 mph (40 km/h) zone. The police officer ticketed Knowles rather than arresting him, as was permitted under Iowa law. The officer then searched the car, finding marijuana and a "pot pipe." Knowles was then arrested and charged with violation of state laws dealing with controlled substances.

Before trial, Knowles argued the search was not applicable to the "search incident to arrest" exception recognized in United States v. Robinson, because he had not been placed under arrest. At the hearing on the motion to suppress, the police officer conceded that he had neither Knowles' consent nor probable cause to conduct the search. He relied on Iowa law dealing with such searches.

Because Iowa Code § 321.485(1)(a) permits either an arrest or a citation when making a traffic stop, the Iowa Supreme Court has interpreted this provision as providing authority to officers to conduct a full-blown search of an automobile and driver in those cases where police elect not to make a custodial arrest. The trial court denied the motion to suppress and the defendant was convicted.

A divided Iowa Supreme Court upheld the search and the conviction.

== Supreme Court ==
The U.S. Supreme Court decided that the search was unlawful.

Once Knowles was stopped for speeding and issued a citation, all the evidence necessary to prosecute that offense had been obtained. No further evidence of excessive speed was going to be found either on the person of the offender or in the passenger compartment of the car.

Because, given the type of stop, there were no grounds for the officer to believe that his safety was in jeopardy, and thus had no probable cause to perform a search without consent of the driver. Also, since Knowles was not "in custody", there was no custodial exception to permit a search either. Thus the search was ruled illegal.

The Supreme Court reversed the case and remanded it for redetermination.
