= Searches incident to a lawful arrest =

US legal rule about allowed warrantless searches

Search incident to a lawful arrest, commonly known as search incident to arrest (SITA) or the Chimel rule (from Chimel v. California), is an American legal principle that allows police to perform a warrantless search of an arrested person and the area within the arrestee's immediate control in the interest of officer safety, the prevention of escape or the preservation of evidence.

Such searches are exceptions to the usual practice of obtaining a search warrant pursuant to the Fourth Amendment.

== Supreme Court decisions ==
=== 1940s ===
- In Harris v. United States (1947), the Supreme Court of the United States held that a law enforcement officer was permitted to perform a warrantless search during or immediately after a lawful arrest of the arrestee and their premises, regardless of the purpose of the arrest.

=== 1950s ===
- In United States v. Rabinowitz (1950), the Court narrowed its ruling to searches of the area within the arrestee's "immediate control."

=== 1960s ===
- In Chimel v. California (1969), the Court further limited the exception to the arrestee and the area within their immediate control "in order to remove any weapons that the [arrestee] might seek to use in order to resist arrest or effect his escape" and to prevent the "concealment or destruction" of evidence.

=== 1970s ===
- United States v. Robinson (1973) – The Court held that "in the case of a lawful custodial arrest a full search of the person is not only an exception to the warrant requirement of the Fourth Amendment, but is also a reasonable search under that Amendment."

=== 1990s ===
- Maryland v. Buie (1990) – The Court held that the Fourth Amendment permits a properly limited protective sweep in conjunction with an in-home arrest when the searching officer possesses a reasonable belief based on specific and articulable facts that the area to be swept harbors a person who poses a danger to those on the scene.

=== 2000s ===
- Arizona v. Gant (2009) – The Court ruled that law-enforcement officers may search automobiles following arrest only if the arrestee "could have accessed his car at the time of the search." In other words, if the person arrested could conceivably reach into his car for a weapon, then a search based on officer safety is permitted. Absent these circumstances, the former practice of allowing officers to "search [a car] incident to arrest" is no longer permitted unless the police have reason to believe that the vehicle contains evidence of the offense of arrest.

=== 2010s ===
- Missouri v. McNeely (2013) The Court ruled that police must generally obtain a warrant before subjecting a drunk-driving suspect to a blood test, and that the natural metabolism of blood alcohol does not establish a per se exigency that would justify a blood draw without consent.
- Riley v. California (2014) – The Court held that "police generally may not, without a warrant, search digital information on a cell phone seized from an individual who has been arrested." In other words, unless an exigent circumstance is present, police may not search an arrestee's cell phone without a warrant.
- Birchfield v. North Dakota (2016) - The Court held that for investigations regarding suspected driving under the influence, warrantless breathalyzer tests are permissible under the Fourth Amendment given that the impact on privacy is "slight", while more intrusive blood tests involving piercing the skin are not. The Court stated that "there must be a limit to the consequences to which motorists may be deemed to have consented by virtue of a decision to drive on public roads" under implied-consent laws and "that motorists could be deemed to have consented to only those conditions that are 'reasonable' in that they have a 'nexus' to the privilege of driving".

== See also ==
- Information privacy law
