= Arizona v. Gant =

- Supreme Court of the United States

Argued October 7, 2008 Decided April 21, 2009
- Full case name: State of Arizona, Petitioner v. Rodney Joseph Gant
- Docket no.: 07-542
- Citations: 556 U.S. 332 (more) 129 S.Ct. 1710; 173 L. Ed. 2d 485; 2009 U.S. LEXIS 3120; 77 USLW 4285; 09 Cal. Daily Op. Serv. 4732; 2009 Daily Journal D.A.R. 5611; 21 Fla. L. Weekly Fed. S 781

Holding
- 1) Belton does not authorize a vehicle search incident to a recent occupant’s arrest after the arrestee has been secured and cannot access the interior of the vehicle. 2) Circumstances unique to the automobile context justify a search incident to arrest when it is reasonable to believe that evidence of the offense of arrest might be found in the vehicle.

Court membership
- Chief Justice John Roberts Associate Justices John P. Stevens · Antonin Scalia; Anthony Kennedy · David Souter; Clarence Thomas · Ruth Bader Ginsburg; Stephen Breyer · Samuel Alito

Case opinions
- Majority: Stevens, joined by Scalia, Souter, Thomas, Ginsburg
- Concurrence: Scalia
- Dissent: Breyer
- Dissent: Alito, joined by Roberts, Kennedy; Breyer (except Part II–E)

Laws applied
- U.S. Const. amend. IV

Arizona v. Gant, 556 U.S. 332 (2009), was a United States Supreme Court decision holding that the Fourth Amendment to the United States Constitution requires law-enforcement officers to demonstrate an actual and continuing threat to their safety posed by an arrestee, or a need to preserve evidence related to the crime of arrest from tampering by the arrestee, in order to justify a warrantless vehicular search incident to arrest conducted after the vehicle's recent occupants have been arrested and secured.

== Background ==
The case involved Rodney J. Gant, who was arrested by Tucson, Arizona police on an outstanding warrant for driving with a suspended driver’s license. Police arrested Gant in a friend's yard after he had parked his vehicle and was walking away. Gant and all other suspects on the scene were then secured in police patrol cars. After the officers searched Gant's vehicle and found a weapon and a bag of cocaine, they also charged him with possession of a narcotic drug for sale and possession of drug paraphernalia.

== Arguments before the court ==
Gant's counsel argued that an unreasonable expansion of a limited authority to search vehicles incident to arrest provided by the Supreme Court's 1981 decision in New York v. Belton, which granted police the authority to search a person's vehicle even if the person is not in the vehicle, had been occurring. Lower courts had been permitting searches that occurred after the initial justification for setting aside the Fourth Amendment's warrant requirement had ceased to exist, relying on a so-called bright-line rule of "if arrest, then search." Gant argued, and the court ultimately agreed, that such application of the Belton rule caused the exception to "swallow the rule," allowing unconstitutional searches.

=== Amici curiae ===
A group of legal scholars, including University of Iowa law professor James Tomkovicz, wrote an amicus curiae brief asking the court to overturn Belton. Tomkovicz argued Belton failed to meet the constitutional standard of probable cause.

== Opinion of the court ==
In an opinion delivered by Justice Stevens, the Supreme Court held that police may search the passenger compartment of a vehicle incident to a recent occupant's arrest (and therefore without a warrant) only if it is reasonable to believe that the arrestee might access the vehicle at the time of the search, or that the vehicle contains evidence of the offense of arrest.

Justice Scalia wrote a concurring opinion, stating that "we should simply abandon the Belton-Thornton charade of officer safety and overrule those cases. I would hold that a vehicle search incident to arrest is ipso facto 'reasonable' only when the object of the search is evidence of the crime for which the arrest was made, or of another crime that the officer has probable cause to believe occurred."

Justice Alito wrote a dissent joined by Chief Justice Roberts, Justice Kennedy and Justice Breyer in part, arguing that the court could not overrule New York v. Belton and Thornton v. United States, 541 U. S. 615 (2004).

Justice Breyer wrote a separate dissent agreeing with Justice Alito that New York v. Belton established a bright-line rule allowing a warrantless search of a vehicle's passenger compartment incident to the lawful arrest, but Breyer acknowledged that this rule can lead to outcomes that diverge from the underlying rationale of the Fourth Amendment.

== See also ==
- List of United States Supreme Court cases
- List of United States Supreme Court cases, volume 556
- Chimel v. California (1969)
- New York v. Belton
