= Chimel v. California =

1969 U.S. Supreme Court case

- Supreme Court of the United States

Argued March 27, 1969 Decided June 23, 1969
- Full case name: Ted Chimel v. State of California
- Citations: 395 U.S. 752 (more) 89 S. Ct. 2034; 23 L. Ed. 2d 685; 1959 U.S. LEXIS 1166
- Argument: Oral argument

Case history
- Prior: Conviction affirmed, People v. Chimel, 61 Cal. Rptr. 714 (Ct. App. 1967); affirmed, 68 Cal. 2d 436, 439 P.2d 333 (1968); cert. granted, 393 U.S. 958 (1968).
- Subsequent: Rehearing denied, 396 U.S. 869 (1969).

Holding
- An arresting officer may search only the area "within the immediate control" of the person arrested, meaning the area from which he might gain possession of a weapon or destructible evidence. Any other search of the surrounding area requires a search warrant.

Court membership
- Chief Justice Earl Warren Associate Justices Hugo Black · William O. Douglas; John M. Harlan II · William J. Brennan Jr. Potter Stewart · Byron White; Thurgood Marshall

Case opinions
- Majority: Stewart, joined by Warren, Douglas, Harlan, Brennan, Marshall
- Concurrence: Harlan
- Dissent: White, joined by Black

Laws applied
- U.S. Const. amend. IV; U.S. Const. amend. XIV

Chimel v. California, 395 U.S. 752 (1969), was a 1969 United States Supreme Court case in which the court held that police officers arresting a person at his home could not search the entire home without a search warrant, but that police may search the area within immediate reach of the person without a warrant. The rule on searches incident to a lawful arrest within the home is now known as the Chimel rule.

Ronald M. George, the young deputy attorney general who unsuccessfully argued California's case, later became chief justice of the Supreme Court of California.

== Background ==
Police officers with a warrant authorizing Chimel's arrest on counts of burglary from a coin shop were allowed into his home by Chimel's wife, where they awaited his return in order to serve him with the warrant. Upon receiving his warrant for arrest, "Chimel denied the request of officers to look around" his home for further evidence. Ignoring Chimel, the police officers continued their search of Chimel's home "on the basis of the lawful arrest," and the police "instructed Chimel's wife to remove items from drawers," where she eventually found coins and metals. Later at Chimel's trial for burglary charges, "items taken from his home were admitted over objection from Chimel that they had been unconstitutionally seized." However, a number of these items, including the coins and medals that were taken from his home, were used to convict Chimel.

The state courts upheld the conviction despite Chimel's claim that the arrest warrant was invalid. Prior to Chimel, the court's precedents permitted an arresting officer to search the area within an arrestee's "possession" and "control" for the purpose of gathering evidence. Based on the "abstract doctrine," it had sustained searches that extended far beyond an arrestee's area of immediate reach.

== Decision and significance ==
The Supreme Court ruled 6–2 in favor of Chimel. It held that the search of Chimel's house was unreasonable under the Fourth and Fourteenth Amendments.

The court reasoned that searches "incident to arrest" are limited to the area within the immediate control of the suspect. While police could reasonably search for and seize evidence on or around the arrestee's person, police were prohibited from rummaging through the entire house without a search warrant. The court emphasized the importance of warrants and probable cause as necessary bulwarks against government abuse:

When an arrest is made, it is reasonable for the arresting officer to search the person arrested in order to remove any weapons that the arrestee later might seek to use in order to resist arrest or effect his escape. Otherwise, the officer's safety might well be endangered, and the arrest itself frustrated. In addition, it is entirely reasonable for the arresting officer to search for and seize any evidence on the arrestee's person in order to prevent its concealment or destruction. And the area into which an arrestee might reach in order to grab a weapon or evidentiary items must, of course, be governed by a similar rule. A gun on a table or in a drawer in front of one who is arrested can be as dangerous to the arresting officer as one concealed in the clothing of the person arrested. There is ample justification, therefore, for a search of the arrestee's person and the area "within his immediate control"—construing that phrase to mean the area from within which he might gain possession of a weapon or destructible evidence. There is no comparable justification, however, for routinely searching any room other than that in which an arrest occurs—or, for that matter, for searching through all the desk drawers or other closed or concealed areas in that room itself. Such searches, in the absence of well recognized exceptions, may be made only under the authority of a search warrant. The "adherence to judicial processes" mandated by the Fourth Amendment requires no less.

— Justice Stewart, delivering the opinion of the Court

The ruling overturned the trial-court conviction by stating that the officers could reasonably search only "the petitioner's person and the area from within which he might have obtained either a weapon or something that could have been used as evidence against him."

== Criticism ==
In his concurring opinion in Riley v. California (2014), citing his dissent in Arizona v. Gant (2009), justice Samuel Alito called Chimel's reasoning "questionable", saying: "I think it is a mistake to allow that reasoning to affect cases like these that concern the search of the person of arrestees."

== See also ==
- List of United States Supreme Court cases, volume 395
