= Employment discrimination against persons with criminal records in the United States =

Employment discrimination against persons with criminal records in the United States has been illegal since enactment of the Civil Rights Act of 1964. Employers retain the right to lawfully consider an applicant's or employee's criminal conviction(s) for employment purposes e.g., hiring, retention, promotion, benefits, and delegated duties.

This policy could potentially have a disproportionate impact on minorities who, as a subpopulation, have higher rates of criminal convictions and arrests. The Equal Employment Opportunity Commission (EEOC) and other protections have been enforcing Title VII since it came into effect in 1965. The EEOC has periodically issued enforcement guidance explaining how employers could use criminal records without violating the Civil Rights Act; in April 2012, it published an enforcement guidance requiring companies to establish procedures to ensure that they are not using criminal records to discriminate by race or national origin.

== Background ==
Title VII of the Civil Rights Act of 1964 defines two types of discrimination: disparate treatment and disparate impact. The Equal Employment Opportunity Commission (EEOC), who has been enforcing Title VII since it came into effect in 1965, has the power to periodically issue an 'enforcement guidance' explaining how employers could use the backgrounds of potential employees (including their criminal records) without violating the Civil Rights Act;

Past actions to protect against discrimination included interpretation of the Civil Rights Act, among other actions. As of 1998, for example, the Equal Employment Opportunity Commission had interpreted the Civil Rights Act to require that, where an employment policy which discriminates against criminals will have a disparate racial impact, employers must show a business necessity before automatically disqualifying criminals.

In April 2012, the EEOC published an enforcement guidance requiring companies to establish procedures to show that they are not using criminal records to discriminate by race or national origin. The EEOC indicated that they were investigating "hundreds of charges related to the use of criminal history in employment". EEOC endorsed removing a conviction question from the job application as a best practice in its 2012 guidance.

Some United States statute and regulations prohibit or restrict the hiring of criminals for many types of jobs including law enforcement, correction officers, health care workers or educators. Additionally, the military and the Peace Corps forbid licensing boards from granting professional licenses to said individuals. Boards are often required to consider the applicant's moral character and some are authorized to consider criminal prosecutions which did not result in the applicant's actual conviction of a crime e.g., criminal charges dismissed as a result of deferred adjudication or other diversion program. Such professions include trades and occupations involving work in private residences and businesses, work involving vulnerable members of the public such as children and seniors and transportation drivers.

== Statistics ==
As of 2008, 6.6 to 7.4 percent, or about one in 15 working-age adults were ex-felons. According to an estimate from 2000, there were over 12 million felons in the United States, representing roughly 8% of the working-age population..In 2016, 6.1 million people were disenfranchised due to convictions, representing 2.47% of voting-age citizens. As of October 2020, an estimated 5.1 million voting-age U.S. citizens are disenfranchised in the 2020 presidential election due to felony convictions, or 1 in 44 citizens.

== All offenders ==
Some state justice systems do not allow arrestees to deny arrests for which the charges were dismissed, and some do not allow those whose charges were expunged to deny the conviction. One side of the argument states that a convicted sex offender has a particularly difficult time finding employment based upon biases and generalizations that are associated with the label and criminal record. As a result, legislation may be more difficult to pass for the protection of this type of discrimination. Common entertainment such as Law and Order SVU and Criminal Minds possibly twist the realities of threat or recidivism when applied to rehabilitated offenders returning to citizenship in society, although these perceptions could differ in the hirings of persons with criminal records.

== Case law ==
Some courts have rejected any notion that basing hiring decisions on criminal convictions constitutes any type of illegal discrimination.

In addition, there is no known legal recourse for news agencies to remove American citizens from police blotters. However, there are often limits on a sex offender’s placement on the sex offender registry.

== See also ==
- Involuntary unemployment
- Loss of rights due to felony conviction
