= Equal Pay Act and prior salary =

Prior salary information is one of the factors involved in the implementation of the Equal Pay Act and prior salary legislation in the United States.

== Controversy ==
The Equal Pay Act forbids American employers from paying men and women different wages for equal jobs that require equal skill, effort, and responsibility, performed under similar conditions. However, employers can rebut Equal Pay Act challenges by showing that the contested pay differential is based on seniority, merit, quantity or quality of work produced or "any other factor other than sex". Courts disagree about whether an employee's prior salary information counts as "any other factor other than sex".

In the 9th Circuit, prior salary information no longer counts as a factor other than sex, according to a recent case, Rizo v. Yovino. Specifically, employers can no longer justify the wage differential between male and female employees by relying on their prior salaries, either alone or in combination with other factors. The 9th Circuit reasoned that prior salary is not a legitimate measure of work experience, and that "it may well operate to perpetuate the wage disparities prohibited under the [Equal Pay] Act."

The Second, Sixth and Eleventh Circuits allow employers to rely on applicants' prior salary to justify wage differentials between genders, if an employer has an "acceptable business reason" for setting starting pay based on prior salary.

In contrast, the 7th Circuit held that employers may rely on an employee's prior salary to justify wage differentials between genders, without needing to provide an "acceptable business reason" for basing starting pay on this factor. The Seventh Circuit reasoned that requiring employers to have an "acceptable business reason" to base pay on prior salary would be extending the Equal Pay Act from the disparate treatment context to disparate impact. The 8th Circuit follows similar analysis to the 7th Circuit.

== Other factors ==
In the interest of equal pay, some states have laws that ban employers from asking job applicants for prior salary information entirely. For example, Governor Jerry Brown of California passed AB 168, which forbids all California employers, including state and local government employers, from asking for applicants' prior salary information. AB 168 took effect on January 1, 2018, and amended California Labor Code Section 432.3. However, it still allows job applicants to disclose prior salary information, and allows employers to rely on voluntarily disclosed salary history information, but prior salary may not be used to justify gender disparities in compensation. In the wake of Rizo v. Yovino, it is unclear whether California employers may consider prior salaries when negotiating for salary, if applicants voluntarily disclose prior salary information.

=== Key cases ===
- Aldrich v. Randolph Cent. Sch. Dist., 963 F.2d 520 (2d Cir. 1992)
- Corning Glass Works v. Brennan, 417 U.S. 188 (1974)
- EEOC v. J.C. Penney Co., 843 F.2d 249 (6th Cir.1992)
- Glenn v. Gen. Motors Corp., 841 F.2d 1567 (11th Cir. 1988)
- Irby v. Bittick, 44 F.3d 949 (11th Cir. 1995)
- Price v. Lockheed Space Operations Co., 856 F.2d 1503 (11th Cir. 1988)
- Price v. N. States Power Co., 664 F.3d 1186 (8th Cir. 2011)
- Rizo v. Yovino, 887 F.3d 453 (9th Cir. 2018), which overrules Kouba v. Allstate Insurance Co., 691 F.2d 873 (9th Cir. 1982)
- Taylor v. White, 321 F.3d 710, 718 (8th Cir. 2003)
- Wernsing v. Dep't of Human Servs., State of Illinois, 427 F.3d 466 (7th Cir. 2005)

=== Treatises ===
- Compensation based on employee's previous pay, 1 Emp. Discrim. Coord. Analysis of Federal Law § 26:21, June 2018 Update
- Construction and application of provisions of Equal Pay Act of 1963 (29 U.S.C.A. § 206(d)) prohibiting wage discrimination on basis of sex, 7 A.L.R. Fed. 707 (Originally published in 1971, updated weekly)
- Employers Violate Equal Pay Act When They Consider New Employees' Prior Salaries In Establishing Salary Structures, 39 No. 5 Cal. Tort Rep. NL 4, May 2018
- Manual on Employment Discrimination and Civil Rights Actions in the Federal Courts, § 2:35."Shifting" of the burden of proof—Common factor other than sex, June 2018 Update
- Sex-Based Employment Discrimination, § 8:5.Any other factor other than sex generally, 1 (June 2018 Update). (Note, however, that references to Rizo v. Yovino in this source are out of date, as they do not reflect the April 2018 opinion).
- State & Local Government Civil Rights Liability, Chapter 7. The Equal Pay Act, § 7:14.Statutory defenses—Any factor other than sex, November 217 Update
