= Kennedy v. Louisiana =

2008 landmark United States Supreme Court case

- Supreme Court of the United States

Argued April 16, 2008 Decided June 25, 2008
- Full case name: Patrick O. Kennedy v. State of Louisiana
- Docket no.: 07-343
- Citations: 554 U.S. 407 (more) 128 S. Ct. 2641; 171 L. Ed. 2d 525; 2008 U.S. LEXIS 5262; 2008 WL 2511282; 08 Cal. Daily Op. Serv. 7920; 76 U.S.L.W. 4584; 2008 Daily Journal D.A.R. 9470; 21 Fla. L. Weekly Fed. S 472
- Argument: Oral argument

Case history
- Prior: Defendant convicted, sentenced, La. Dist. Ct., Aug. 26, 2003; aff'd, State v. Kennedy, 957 So.2d 757 (La. 2007); cert. granted, 552 U.S. 1087 (2008).
- Procedural: Writ of Certiorari to the Louisiana Supreme Court
- Subsequent: Supplemental briefing ordered, 554 U.S. 943 (2008). Opinion modified; Petition for Rehearing denied, 554 U.S. 945 (2008)

Holding
- The Eighth Amendment bars Louisiana from imposing the death penalty for the rape of a child where the crime did not result, and was not intended to result, in the victim’s death.

Court membership
- Chief Justice John Roberts Associate Justices John P. Stevens · Antonin Scalia; Anthony Kennedy · David Souter; Clarence Thomas · Ruth Bader Ginsburg; Stephen Breyer · Samuel Alito

Case opinions
- Majority: Kennedy, joined by Stevens, Souter, Ginsburg, Breyer
- Dissent: Alito, joined by Roberts, Scalia, Thomas

Laws applied
- U.S. Const. amends. VIII, XIV; La. Stat. Ann. §14:42

Kennedy v. Louisiana, 554 U.S. 407 (2008), is a landmark decision by the Supreme Court of the United States which held that the Eighth Amendment's Cruel and Unusual Punishments Clause prohibits the imposition of the death penalty for a crime in which the victim did not die and the victim's death was not intended.

== Background ==
Rape was a capital crime in most jurisdictions during the 19th and early-20th century. In 1972 the Court decided in Furman v. Georgia that arbitrary and capricious sentencing outcomes in death penalty cases were unconstitutional. States revised their statutes to comply with Furman. The new statutes and constitutionality of the death penalty were upheld in Gregg v. Georgia (1976).

The categorical exclusion of some classes of defendants from death penalty eligibility in Atkins v. Virginia, Enmund v. Florida and Roper v. Simmons was because of the diminished culpability of juveniles and intellectually disabled defendants. Until Kennedy v. Louisiana, the only case to categorically exclude a crime was Coker v. Georgia (1977), when the Supreme Court held that the death penalty was unconstitutional for the crime of raping an adult. After Coker some states introduced new legislation allowing the death penalty for rape of very young children under 12, based on a theory that Coker was limited to the rape of adult women (the victim in that case was a 16 year old married woman with a newborn baby). Kennedy held that the death penalty is a disproportionate punishment not only for the rape of an adult woman, but also for the rape of a child, and for any ordinary non-homicide crime where a life was not taken. The Court noted that the "evolving standards of decency...requires that use of the death penalty be restrained".

== Case history ==
Patrick O'Neal Kennedy
- Born: December 13, 1964 (age 61); Harvey, Louisiana, U.S.
- Status: Incarcerated
- Conviction: Aggravated rape of a child
- Penalty: Death; commuted to life imprisonment

Details
- Date: March 1998
- Imprisoned at: Elayn Hunt Correctional Center

Patrick O'Neal Kennedy (born December 13, 1964), a man from Harvey, Louisiana in Greater New Orleans, was sentenced to death after being convicted of raping and sodomizing his eight-year-old stepdaughter. The rape, taking place in March 1998, was uncommonly brutal: it tore the victim's perineum "from her vaginal opening to her anal opening. [It] tore her vagina on the interior such that it separated partially from her cervix and allowed her rectum to protrude into her vagina. Invasive emergency surgery was required to repair these injuries." The victim told the police that Kennedy had raped her on at least four other occasions and coached her to pin the crime on two teenagers. Kennedy was also accused of molesting four foster children.

Kennedy maintained that the battery was committed by two neighborhood boys, and refused to plead guilty when a deal was offered to spare him from a death sentence. Nevertheless, he was convicted in 2003 and sentenced under a 1995 Louisiana law that allowed the death penalty for the rape of a child under the age of 12.

On appeal, Kennedy challenged the constitutionality of executing a person solely for child rape. The Louisiana Supreme Court rejected the challenge on the grounds that the death penalty was not too harsh for such a heinous offense. The Louisiana court distinguished the U.S. Supreme Court's plurality decision in Coker v. Georgia (1977), concluding that Coker's rejection of death as punishment for rape of an adult woman did not apply when the victim was a child.

Kennedy was one of two men in the country under sentence of death for a crime other than murder; the other, Richard L. Davis, had been sentenced in 2007 under the same Louisiana law for repeatedly raping a five-year-old girl. Kennedy sought direct review of the Louisiana Supreme Court's decision in the Supreme Court of the United States, which agreed to hear the case in January 2008.

== Argument ==
Jeffrey L. Fisher, a Stanford Law School professor appealing on behalf of Kennedy, argued there was "overwhelming national consensus" against capital punishment for rape, including child rape. He argued that between 1930 and 1964, the last year such an execution had occurred, most of the people executed for rape in the United States were Black. Furthermore, all fourteen people executed for rape in Louisiana during that same time period were Black.

The state of Louisiana said that more States were authorizing the death sentence for child rape since Coker. In Atkins the Supreme Court had written that "it is not so much the number of these States that is significant, but the consistency of the direction of change" for a finding of national consensus against the execution of the intellectually disabled. The state of Louisiana argued that the same logic should apply to expand death penalty availability if the number of states authorizing the death penalty for that crime has been increasing over time.

== Questions of law presented ==
1. Does the Eighth Amendment's Cruel and Unusual Punishment Clause permit a state to use the death penalty to punish the crime of raping a child?
2. If so, does Louisiana's capital rape statute violate the Eighth Amendment insofar as it fails genuinely to narrow the class of such offenders eligible for the death penalty?

== Opinion of the Supreme Court ==
=== Majority ===
The Court based its decision on the "evolving standards of decency" analysis. First, they looked for evidence that national consensus was against the death penalty for the crime of child rape. In the few states that allowed the death penalty for child rape, no one had yet been sentenced to death under the existing laws, which the court weighed against the death penalty.

Second, the Court conducted its own independent analysis guided by the principle that "evolving standards of decency...counsel us to be most hesitant before interpreting the Eighth Amendment to allow the extension of the death penalty". Noting the precedents Coker v. Georgia and Enmund v. Florida the Court concluded that the death penalty is a disproportionate punishment for non-homicide crimes, including "child rape":

The court concludes that there is a distinction between intentional first-degree murder, on the one hand, and non-homicide crimes against individuals, even including child rape, on the other. The latter crimes may be devastating in their harm, as here, but in terms of moral depravity and of the injury to the person and to the public, they cannot compare to murder in their severity and irrevocability.

Even when there is severe and permanent physical injury to the child rape victim, in the Court's view, allowing capital punishment for the rapist would not serve a legitimate retributive purpose because "it is not at all evident that the child rape victim's hurt is lessened" by executing the rapist.

The opinion concluded that in cases of crimes against individuals, "the death penalty should not be expanded to instances where the victim's life was not taken". The majority opinion left open the possibility of the death penalty for "drug kingpin activity", as well as treason, espionage and terrorism, these being considered crimes against "the State" rather than against "individual persons":

Our concern here is limited to crimes against individual persons. We do not address, for example, crimes defining and punishing treason, espionage, terrorism, and drug kingpin activity, which are offenses against the State.

=== Dissent ===
In his dissent, Justice Alito sharply criticized the majority for usurping the role of the legislature. Alito argued that Kennedy's rationale for defining national consensus was flawed, because the previous Coker decision had "stunted legislative consideration of the question whether the death penalty for the targeted offense of raping a young child is consistent with prevailing standards of decency." In this Alito followed former Chief Justice Warren Burger, who had dissented from Coker because it, in his view, prevented a full debate over the uses of the recently reinstated death penalty. In this vein, Alito also argued that "The Eighth Amendment protects the right of an accused. It does not authorize this Court to strike down federal or state criminal laws on the ground that they are not in the best interests of crime victims or the broader society."

== Reactions ==
The decision was handed down in the run-up to a presidential election and both the Democratic and Republican presidential candidates, Barack Obama and John McCain, criticized the majority opinion.

Barack Obama said at a news conference in Chicago:

I have said repeatedly that I think that the death penalty should be applied in very narrow circumstances for the most egregious of crimes ... I think that the rape of a small child, six or eight years old, is a heinous crime and if a state makes a decision that under narrow, limited, well-defined circumstances the death penalty is at least potentially applicable, that that does not violate our Constitution.

John McCain responded to the ruling by calling it:

An assault on law enforcement's efforts to punish these heinous felons for the most despicable crime. That there is a judge anywhere in America who does not believe that the rape of a child represents the most heinous of crimes, which is deserving of the most serious of punishments, is profoundly disturbing.

During his 2012 campaign for a Texas Senate seat, Ted Cruz was criticized for not including the military case law in his brief to the Supreme Court. Cruz responded stating that the oversight did not affect the ruling as Louisiana raised the issue when it requested a rehearing, which was denied.

US map of states that have passed Death Penalty laws for child rapists as of 2026, though it will be judicially unenforceable unless Kennedy v. Louisiana is overturned.

Several states, including Florida in 2023, Tennessee in 2024, Alabama in 2025 and Idaho in 2026 have passed laws allowing the death penalty for child rapists despite the ruling.

== Subsequent developments ==
=== Reversed death sentence ===
The Louisiana Supreme Court remanded the case back to the district court for resentencing. After a brief hearing, Kennedy was sentenced to life imprisonment without the possibility of parole on January 7, 2009.

=== Petition for rehearing ===
Three days after the case was decided, Dwight Sullivan, a colonel in the United States Marine Corps Reserve who was the Chief Defense Counsel for the Office of Military Commissions, noted in his CAAFlog on military justice that Congress had revised the Uniform Code of Military Justice in 2006 to add child rape to the list of offenses punishable in the military by death. None of the 10 briefs filed with the Court, and neither the majority nor dissent, mentioned the provision. On July 2, 2008, Linda Greenhouse of The New York Times highlighted Sullivan's post, bringing the issue to national attention.

After the error was discovered, supporters of the law—including the governors of Missouri and Louisiana, and 85 members of Congress—petitioned for rehearing. The United States Department of Justice also filed a brief supporting rehearing. It noted that it too had missed the 2006 amendment; since it has a duty to defend all federal laws, and since the decision called that law into question, it was duty-bound to favor rehearing.

The court requested briefs from both the state and the defense on the matter with the possibility of amending the ruling. On October 1, 2008, however, the Supreme Court decided 7–2 not to revisit its decision. In addition to the majority of five in the original case, Scalia and Roberts also filed a concurrence, writing that "the views of the American people on the death penalty for child rape were, to tell the truth, irrelevant to the majority's decision in this case ... and there is no reason to believe that absence of a national consensus would provoke second thoughts." Only Thomas and Alito voted for the rehearing.

== See also ==
- List of United States Supreme Court cases
  - List of United States Supreme Court cases, volume 554
- Ford v. Wainwright (1986), interdicted death sentences for those who qualify as mentally insane
- Thompson v. Oklahoma (1988), outlawed the death penalty for anyone under 16
- Payne v. Tennessee (1991), recognized testimony concerning emotional distress of victims' families as non-violative of the Eighth Amendment, thereby reversing previous rulings including South Carolina v. Gathers
- Graham v. Florida (2010), declared life incarceration without the possibility of parole a "cruel and unusual" sentence for non-murder crimes by minors
- Miller v. Alabama (2012), outlawed mandatory sentences of life incarceration without the possibility of parole for all crimes committed when the defendant was under 18
- Coker v. Georgia (1977), holding death penalty for the rape of an adult woman was a violation of the eighth amendment.
