= City of Los Angeles v. Patel =

- Supreme Court of the United States

Argued March 3, 2015 Decided June 22, 2015
- Full case name: City of Los Angeles, Cal. v. Patel, et al.
- Docket no.: 13-1175
- Citations: 576 U.S. 409 (more) 135 S. Ct. 2443; 192 L. Ed. 2d 435
- Argument: Oral argument

Case history
- Prior: 2008 U.S. Dist. LEXIS 78914 (C.D. Cal. Sept. 5, 2008); affirmed, 686 F.3d 1085 (9th Cir. 2012); reversed on rehearing en banc, 738 F.3d 1058 (9th Cir. 2013); cert. granted, 135 S. Ct. 400 (2014).

Holding
- Los Angeles Municipal Code § 41.49, which requires hotel operators to record and keep specific information about their guests on the premises for a 60 -day period and to make those records available to "any officer of the Los Angeles Police Department for inspection" on demand, is facially unconstitutional because it fails to provide the operators with an opportunity for pre-compliance review.

Court membership
- Chief Justice John Roberts Associate Justices Antonin Scalia · Anthony Kennedy; Clarence Thomas · Ruth Bader Ginsburg; Stephen Breyer · Samuel Alito; Sonia Sotomayor · Elena Kagan

Case opinions
- Majority: Sotomayor, joined by Kennedy, Ginsburg, Breyer, Kagan
- Dissent: Scalia, joined by Roberts, Thomas
- Dissent: Alito, joined by Thomas

Laws applied
- U.S. Const. amend. IV; U.S. Const. amend. XIV; Los Angeles Mun. Code § 41.49

City of Los Angeles v. Patel, 576 U.S. 409 (2015), was a United States Supreme Court case in which the Court held that a Los Angeles law, Municipal Code § 41.49, requiring hotel operators to retain records about guests for a 90-day period, is facially unconstitutional under the Fourth Amendment to the United States Constitution because it does not allow for pre-compliance review.

== Background ==
Los Angeles, in its city code, required hotels to keep certain specified information about their customers, including the name and address, vehicle information, dates of the stay, room number, and how the customer paid the bill, among other information. The hotel had to keep the information for 90-days, and if a police officer requested the information, the hotel had to make it available or face criminal penalties. In 2003, Naranjibhai and Ramilaben Patel and other hotel operators sued the city in the federal district court, alleging that the ordinance violated the Fourth Amendment.

=== Lower courts ===
==== U.S. District Court ====
The case was first heard in the U.S. District Court by Judge Dale S. Fischer. The city argued that the hotel industry was "closely regulated," which would allow administrative inspections without a search warrant. Judge Fischer found that the industry was not closely regulated, noting that the city had provided no information to show that it was closely regulated. She concluded, however, that the hotel owners had no reasonable expectation of privacy and that the ordinance was therefore constitutional.

==== Circuit court of appeals ====
Patel appealed to the Ninth Circuit court, where it was heard by a three judge panel consisting of judges Harry Pregerson, Richard R. Clifton, and Carlos Bea. The court, in a 2-1 decision, affirmed the decision of the district court on the same grounds.

==== En banc rehearing ====
The Patels then requested that the case be reheard en banc, before a larger panel of judges in the Ninth Circuit. The en banc court found that the owners, in fact, had a possessory interest in the registry and an expectation of privacy. The fact that it was hotel property and that there was a reasonable expectation of privacy placed the documents under the warrant requirement of the Fourth Amendment. The court reversed on a 7–4 vote.

After the ruling, the City of Los Angeles filed a petition for certiorari to the Supreme Court, which the Court granted on October 20, 2014.

== Supreme Court ==
=== Arguments ===
==== Brief and arguments of Los Angeles ====
The city's brief was prepared by E. Joshua Rosenkranz, Robert M. Loeb, and Rachel W. Apter, of Orrick, Herrington & Sutcliffe; by Orin Kerr; and by Mike Feuer, James P. Clark, Thomas H. Peters, Gregory P. Orland of the City Attorney's Office. Rosenkranz argued that the ordinance had been in effect and used for 150 years and only required showing the police a single book. Further, that the use of the register serves as a deterrent to crime.

==== Brief and arguments of Patel ====
Patel's brief was prepared by Thomas C. Goldstein, Kevin K. Russell, and Tejinder Singh, of Goldstein & Russell; and by the Supreme Court Litigation Clinic, Harvard Law School.

==== Amicus briefs ====
Amicus curiae briefs in support of Los Angeles were filed by the United States, the County of Los Angeles (Note: Joined by the League of California Cities and the California State Association of Counties.), by California, (Note: Joined by the states of Arizona, Hawaii, Maine, Michigan, Pennsylvania and South Carolina.) Drug Free America Foundation, (Note: Joined by Community Anti-Drug Collations of America and the Institute on Global Drug Policy.) California State Sheriffs' Association, (Note: Joined by the California Police Chiefs' Association, California Peace Officers' Association, National Sheriffs' Association, Major County Sheriffs' Association, and Los Angeles County Police Chiefs' Association.) and the Manhattan Institute for Policy Research. Briefs in support of Patel were filed by the Asian American Hotel Owners Association, the Electronic Frontier Foundation, the U.S. Chamber of Commerce, the Rutherford Institute, Gun Owners of America (Note: Joined by Gun Owners Foundation, U.S. Justice Foundation, Lincoln Institute For Research And Education, Abraham Lincoln Foundation, Downsize DC Foundation, Downsizedc.Org, Conservative Legal Defense And Education Fund, and the Policy Analysis Center.), the Cato Institute, Professors Adam Lamparello & Charles E. MacLean, Institute for Justice, Google, and the Electronic Privacy Information Center. A brief in support of neither party was filed by Love146.

=== Opinion of the Court ===
Associate Justice Sonia Sotomayor authored the 5–4 majority opinion, joined by Justices Anthony Kennedy, Ruth Bader Ginsburg, Stephen Breyer, and Elena Kagan. The majority opinion held that "facial challenges under the Fourth Amendment are not categorically barred or especially disfavored" and cited cases such as Sibron v. New York and Chandler v. Miller.

Justice Antonin Scalia, joined by Roberts and Clarence Thomas, wrote a dissent to argue that such a warrantless search is permitted in this case because it satisfies the conditions of a regulatory scheme for a closely regulated business. Justice Samuel Alito, joined by Thomas, filed a second dissent, listing five other scenarios where the law could be applied constitutionally.

== See also ==
- List of United States Supreme Court cases, volume 576
