= Felony =

Serious crime

A felony is traditionally considered a crime of high seriousness, whereas a misdemeanor is regarded as less serious. The term "felony" originated from English common law (from the French medieval word "félonie") to describe an offense that resulted in the confiscation of a convicted person's land and goods, to which additional punishments, including capital punishment, could be added; other crimes were called misdemeanors. Following conviction of a felony in a court of law, a person may be described as a felon or a convicted felon.

In many common-law jurisdictions, such as England and Wales, Ireland, Canada, Australia, and New Zealand, crimes are no longer classified as felonies or misdemeanors. Instead, crimes are classified by mode of trial as indictable offenses, triable by jury, and frequently requiring a grand jury indictment, which are usually more serious, and summary offenses, triable by summary procedure without a jury and are usually less serious.

In some civil law jurisdictions, such as Italy and Spain, the term delict is used to describe serious offenses, a category similar to common law felony. In other nations, such as Germany, France, Belgium, and Switzerland, more serious offenses are described as "crimes", while "misdemeanors" or "delicts" (or délits) are less serious. In still others, such as Brazil and Portugal, "crimes" and "delicts" are synonymous (more serious) and are opposed to contraventions (less serious).

== Jurisdictions ==
=== Cameroon ===
In the law of Cameroon, a felony is a crime for which the maximum sentence is more than 10 years, or death. Felonies are distinguished from misdemeanors (maximum sentence from 10 days to 10 years) and offenses (not exceeding 10 days). While lesser crimes are tried before a magistrate's court, felonies must be tried before a high court (tribunal de grande instance).

The drafters of the bilingual Cameroonian penal code of 1967 based their work on French law and Nigerian law. In the case of felonies, they chose to set the threshold for felonies much higher than under either French law (five years) or Nigerian law (three years). This had the effect of greatly reducing the number of felonies under Cameroonian law. It also reduced the number of crimes that were subject to trial by jury in the courts of East Cameroon at that time.

=== Germany ===
A felony (Verbrechen, a word also translated in less technical contexts as simply "crime") is defined in the Strafgesetzbuch (Criminal Code, StGB) as an unlawful act (rechtswidrige Tat) that is punishable with a minimum of one year's imprisonment. A misdemeanor (Vergehen) is any other crime punishable by imprisonment with a minimum of less than one year or by fine.

However, in some cases a severe version of a misdemeanor may be punished with imprisonment of more than one year, yet the crime itself remains considered a misdemeanor. The same applies for a milder version of a felony that is punished with imprisonment less than a year.

An attempt to commit a felony is itself a crime, whereas an attempt to commit a misdemeanor is a crime only if specifically prescribed as such by law.

=== Ireland ===
In Irish law the distinction between felony and misdemeanor was abolished by section 3 of the Criminal Law Act, 1997, such that the law previously applied to misdemeanors was extended to all offenses. Minister Joan Burton, introducing the bill in the Seanad, said "The distinction has been eroded over many years and in today's conditions has no real relevance. Today, for example, serious offenses such as fraudulent conversion and obtaining property by false pretenses are classified as misdemeanors whereas a relatively trivial offense such as stealing a bar of chocolate is a felony." The 1997 Act, modeled on the English Criminal Law Act 1967, introduced the category of "arrestable offense" for those with penalties of five years' imprisonment or greater.

The 1937 Constitution declares that the parliamentary privilege, which protects Oireachtas members from arrest traveling to or from the legislature, does not apply to "treason, felony, and breach of the peace". The 1996 Constitutional Review Group recommended replacing "felony" with "serious criminal offence".

=== United Kingdom ===
==== England and Wales ====
===== History =====
The concept of "felony" rests upon an oddly circular legal fiction; the common law has never actually defined the act of felony, yet its prosecution proceeds as though it has. Legal historian Frederic William Maitland explained that the medieval concept of felony can only be known "by its legal effects; any definition that would turn upon the quality of the crime is unattainable". As explained above, felony is still defined today in American jurisprudence in consequentialist terms, as any crime punishable by more than a year in prison. It is defined not in terms of the criminal act itself, but by how the law responds to that act. In other words, a felony cannot be said to truly exist until the law has already treated a particular crime as such, "but in order to treat it as a felony, the law must pretend that it recognizes its object".

This fundamental flaw at the heart of the problem of what is a felony has been recognized by English writers since the medieval era. In the Knight's Tale, Geoffrey Chaucer introduces Felonye, a character known only by the company he keeps.

Regardless, this flaw has not prevented legal commentators from attempting to articulate substantive definitions. Sir William Blackstone wrote in the 18th century that felony "comprises every species of crime, which occasioned at common law the forfeiture of lands or goods". The word felony was feudal in origin, denoting the value of a man's entire property: "the consideration for which a man gives up his fief". (Note: The common-law felonies were: murder, manslaughter, mayhem, robbery, larceny, rape, sodomy, arson, and burglary.) Blackstone refutes the misconception that felony simply means an offense punishable by death, by demonstrating that not every felony is capital, and not every capital offense is a felony. However, he concedes that "the idea of felony is indeed so generally connected with that of capital punishment, that we find it hard to separate them; and to this usage the interpretations of the law do now conform."

The death penalty for felony could be avoided by pleading benefit of clergy, which gradually evolved to exempt everybody (whether clergy or not) from that punishment for a first offense, except for high treason and offenses expressly excluded by statute. During the 19th century criminal law reform incrementally reduced the number of capital offenses (see Capital punishment in the United Kingdom), and forfeiture for felony was abolished by the Forfeiture Act 1870. Consequently, the distinction between felony and misdemeanor became increasingly arbitrary in British jurisprudence. The surviving differences consisted of different rules of evidence and procedure, and the Law Commission recommended that felonies be abolished altogether. This was done by the Criminal Law Act 1967, which set the criminal practice for all crimes as that of misdemeanor and introduced a new system of classifying crimes as either "arrestable" and "non-arrestable" offenses (according to which a general power of arrest was available for crimes punishable by five years' imprisonment or more).

Arrestable offenses were abolished in 2006, and today crimes are classified as indictable or summary offenses, the only distinction being the mode of trial (by jury in the Crown Court or summarily in a magistrates' court, respectively).

===== Procedure =====
The Trials for Felony Act 1836 (6 & 7 Will. 4 c. 114) allowed persons indicted for felonies to be represented by counsel or attorney.

===== Terminology =====
A person being prosecuted for this was called a prisoner, though increasingly "accused" or "defendant" was preferred.

==== Northern Ireland ====
Felonies in Northern Ireland were abolished, and criminal procedure for all offences was set as that of misdemeanor effective 29 August 1967, via provision made by the Criminal Law Act (Northern Ireland) 1967.

=== United States ===
Felony Sentences in State Courts, a study by the United States Department of Justice

In the United States, a felony is a crime that is punishable by death or more than one year in prison. The felony–misdemeanor distinction is still widely applied, and the federal government defines a felony as a crime punishable by death or imprisonment in excess of one year. If punishable by exactly one year or less, it is classified as a misdemeanor. The classification is based upon a crime's potential sentence, so a crime remains classified as a felony even if a defendant convicted of a felony receives a sentence of one year or less. Some individual states classify crimes by other factors, such as seriousness or context.

==== History ====
Under common law, felonies were crimes punishable by either death, forfeiture of property, or both. While felony charges remain serious, concerns of proportionality (i.e., that the punishment fits the crime) have since prompted legislatures to require or permit the imposition of less serious punishments, ranging from lesser terms of imprisonment to the substitution of a jail sentence or even the suspension of all incarceration contingent upon a defendant's successful completion of probation. Standards for measurement of an offense's seriousness include attempts to quantitatively estimate and compare the effects of a crime upon its specific victims or society generally.

The reform of harsh felony laws that had originated in Great Britain was deemed "one of the first fruits of liberty" after the United States became independent.

==== Classification by subject matter ====
Felonies may include but are not limited to the following:

- Aggravated assault or battery
- Animal cruelty
- Arson
- Blackmail
- Burglary
- Child pornography
- Copyright infringement
- Cybercrime
- Driving under the influence (certain DUI cases involving bodily injury and/or death. In some jurisdictions property damage over a certain amount elevates a DUI charge to a felony as well)
- False imprisonment
- Forgery
- Fraud
- Grand larceny or grand theft, i.e., larceny or theft above a certain statutorily established value or quantity of goods
- Identity theft
- Illegal drug trade, manufacture, sale, distribution, or possession with intent to distribute certain types or quantities of illegal drugs. In some jurisdictions, the possession of certain types of illegal drugs for personal use.
- Kidnapping
- Manslaughter (unintentional killing of another)
- Murder
- Obstruction of justice
- Perjury
- Police impersonation, with the intention of deception
- Rape/sexual assault
- Resisting arrest, e.g., high-speed chase
- Robbery/extortion
- Usurpation
- Tax evasion
- Threatening an official (police officer, judge)
- Treason
- Vandalism on federal property

Some offenses, though similar in nature, may be felonies or misdemeanors depending on the circumstances. For example, the illegal manufacture, distribution or possession of controlled substances may be a felony, although possession of small amounts may be only a misdemeanor. Possession of a deadly weapon may be generally legal, but carrying the same weapon into a restricted area such as a school may be viewed as a serious offense, regardless of whether there is intent to use the weapon. Additionally, driving under the influence in some US states may be a misdemeanor if a first offense, but a felony on subsequent offenses.

==== Classification by seriousness ====
In much of the United States, all or most felonies are placed into one of various classes according to their seriousness and their potential punishment upon conviction. The number of classifications and the corresponding crimes vary by state and are determined by the legislature. Usually, the legislature also determines the maximum punishment allowable for each felony class; doing so avoids the necessity of defining specific sentences for every possible crime. For example:

- Virginia classifies most felonies by number, ranging from Class 6 (least severe: 1 to 5 years in prison or up to 12 months in jail) through Class 2 (20 years to life, e.g., first-degree murder and aggravated malicious wounding) up to Class 1 (life imprisonment). Some felonies remain outside the classification system.
- New York State classifies felonies by letter, with some classes divided into sub-classes by a Roman numeral; classes range from Class E (encompassing the least severe felonies) through Classes D, C, B, and A–II up to Class A–I (encompassing the most severe).
- Massachusetts classifies a felony as an offense that carries any state prison time (as opposed to a sentence to a county jail).
- Ohio classifies felonies by degree ranging from first, second, third, fourth, to fifth degree. First-degree felonies are the most serious category, while fifth-degree felonies are the least serious. This is broadly the approach taken by the Model Penal Code, although the Code identifies only three degrees of felony.
- In Texas, all felonies are more severe than either infractions or misdemeanors and are classified in capital felonies, first-degree felonies, second-degree felonies, third-degree felonies and state jail felonies.

Some felonies are classified as forcible or violent, typically because they contain some element of force or a threat of force against a person and are subject to additional penalties. Burglary is also classified as a forcible felony in some jurisdictions including Illinois and Florida.

"The common law divided participants in a felony into four basic categories: (1) first-degree principals, those who committed the crime in question; (2) second-degree principals, aiders and abettors present at the scene of the crime; (3) accessories before the fact, aiders and abettors who helped the principal before the basic criminal event took place; and (4) accessories after the fact, persons who helped the principal after the basic criminal event took place. In the course of the 20th century, however, American jurisdictions eliminated the distinction among the first three categories." Gonzales v. Duenas-Alvarez, 549 U.S. 183 (2007) (citations omitted).

==== Consequences ====
In many parts of the United States, a felon can experience long-term legal consequences persisting after the end of their incarceration. The status and designation as a "felon" is considered permanent and is not extinguished upon sentence completion even if parole, probation or early release was given. The status can be cleared only by a successful appeal or executive clemency. However, felons may qualify for restoration of some rights after a certain period of time has passed.

The consequences felons experience in most states include:

- Disenfranchisement (expressly permitted by the Fourteenth Amendment, as noted by the Supreme Court in Richardson v. Ramirez)
- Exclusion from obtaining visas or professional licenses required to legally operate, making some vocations off limits to felons
- Ineligibility to hold office in a labor union (a provision of the Landrum–Griffin Act of 1959)
- Exclusion from purchase and possession of firearms, ammunition, and body armor
- Ineligibility to serve on a jury
- Ineligibility for government assistance or welfare
- Removal (deportation) (if not a citizen)

Additionally, many job applications and rental applications ask about felony history (a practice forbidden in the Commonwealth of Massachusetts), and answering dishonestly can be grounds for rejection of the application or termination of employment if the lie is discovered after hire. Convicted felons may not be eligible for certain professional licenses or bonds, while hiring them may raise the cost of an employer's insurance.

It is broadly legal to discriminate against felons in hiring and leasing decisions (although a blanket ban on renting to felons may violate federal housing law), so felons can face barriers to finding both jobs and housing. Moreover, a common term of parole agreements is to avoid association with other felons. In some neighborhoods with high rates of felony conviction, this creates a situation in which many felons live under a constant threat of being arrested for violating parole. Banks may refuse to issue loans to felons, and a felony conviction may prevent employment in banking or finance.

In some states, restoration of those rights depends on repayment of various fees associated with the felon's arrest, processing, and prison stay, such as restitution to victims, or outstanding fines.

==== Restoration of rights ====
The primary means of restoring civil rights that are lost as a result of a felony conviction are executive clemency and expungement.

For state law convictions, expungement is determined by the law of the state. Many states do not allow expungement, regardless of the offense, though felons can seek pardons and clemency, potentially including restoration of rights.

Federal law does not have any provision for persons convicted of federal felonies in a federal United States district court to apply to have their record expunged. At present the only relief that an individual convicted of a felony in federal court may receive is a presidential pardon, which does not expunge the conviction, but rather grants relief from the civil disabilities that stem from it.

== See also ==
- Backberend and handhabend
- Compounding a felony
- Criminal law
- Employment discrimination against persons with criminal records in the United States
- Federal crime in the United States
- Felony murder rule
- One strike, you're out
- Racketeer Influenced and Corrupt Organizations Act (RICO)
- Three-strikes law
