= Policing Patients =

2024 book by Elizabeth Chiarello

Policing Patients: Treatment and Surveillance on the Frontlines of the Opioid Crisis
- Authors: Elizabeth Chiarello
- Language: English
- Subjects: Sociology
- Publisher: Princeton University Press
- Publication date: 2024
- Publication place: USA
- Media type: Print (hardcover, Paperback)
- Pages: 304
- Awards: Foundation for the Sociology of Health & Illness' Book of the Year Prize (2025); Donald Light Book Award (2025); Herbert Jacob Book Prize (2025)
- ISBN: 978-0691224770

Policing Patients: Treatment and Surveillance on the Frontlines of the Opioid Crisis is a 2024 book by the sociologist Elizabeth Chiarello, published by Princeton University Press. The book is an interview-based study of the relationship between surveillance technologies and the decisions doctors and pharmacists make to dispense opioids, framed within the context of the opioid epidemic in the United States. The book focuses on the use of prescription drug monitoring programs (PDMPs). Policing Patients won the American Sociological Association Section on Medical Sociology Donald Light Book Award and the Foundation for the Sociology of Health & Illness' Book Prize.

== Reception ==
Martin French, in a review for Social Forces, highlighted three strengths in the book: "its chronicling of a new(ish) actor in the longstanding struggle to regulate drugs; its empirical depth; and its teachability". French saw "one of the most important contributions" in Chiarello's work "to shed light on the role of PDMPs^{α} in the re-organization of work in the medico-legal borderland". French commented that "it is vitally important to center the voices of people who use drugs in this discussion" and thought that this would have helped to "deepen the critique of the growing imbrication of care and enforcement".

Writing in Punishment & Society, Ryan T. Steel said: "Policing Patients is written in a clear and approachable manner, abundant in detailed, illuminating examples". Steel saw Chiarello's characterisation of PDMPs as a Trojan horse technology as "the book's most explicit theoretical contribution". Steel summarised that, in the broader context of interventions to address opiod misuse, the book "shows how reactionary efforts to address it have undermined users’ wellbeing while overdose deaths continue unabated".

Carol Heimer, reviewing the book in Law & Society Review, said that "Policing Patients offers an invaluable, deeply sociological, meticulously researched examination of the opioid crisis in the United States." Heimer summarised that the book "explains that the current disaster has been jointly produced by the pharmaceutical companies, hospital and pharmacy organizations, physicians, law enforcement agents, and pharmacists as they pursue their own goals and respond to changing pressures and opportunities."

=== Awards ===
- The Law and Society Association's Herbert Jacob Book Prize (2025).
- ASA Section on Medical Sociology Donald Light Book Award (2025).
- Foundation for the Sociology of Health & Illness' Book Prize (2025).
- Independent Publishers Book Awards Bronze Medal in Health/Medicine (2026).

== Notes ==
^{α} Prescription drug monitoring programs.
