= Hazelwood School District v. United States =

Hazelwood School Dist. v. United States
- Supreme Court of the United States

Argued April 27, 1977 Decided June 27, 1977
- Full case name: Hazelwood School District v. United States
- Citations: 433 U.S. 299 (more) 97 S. Ct. 2736; 53 L. Ed. 2d 768; 1977 U.S. LEXIS 142

Case history
- Prior: Judgment for defendants, 392 F. Supp. 1276 (E.D. Mo. 1975); reversed, 534 F.2d 805 (8th Cir. 1976); certiorari granted, 429 U.S. 1037 (year).

Holding
- In addition to considering the correct relevant labor market in a Title VII disparate-impact case, consider whether the impact that could have been caused by actions taken before Title VII was applied to the employer.

Court membership
- Chief Justice Warren E. Burger Associate Justices William J. Brennan Jr. · Potter Stewart; Byron White · Thurgood Marshall; Harry Blackmun · Lewis F. Powell Jr. William Rehnquist · John P. Stevens

Case opinions
- Majority: Stewart, joined by Burger, Brennan, White, Marshall, Blackmun, Powell, Rehnquist
- Concurrence: Brennan
- Concurrence: White
- Dissent: Stevens

Laws applied
- Title VII of the Civil Rights Act of 1964

Hazelwood School District v. United States, 433 U.S. 299 (1977), was a court case argued before the United States Supreme Court on April 27, 1977. It concerned employment discrimination and was decided on June 27, 1977.

== Case ==
In 1969, the Hazelwood School District in Missouri hired its first black teacher, and continued hiring black teachers ever since. In 1972, the Civil Rights Act of 1964 was amended to apply to public employers, including school districts, making the hiring of black teachers almost a necessity in order to avoid liability. However, due to statistical disparities in the hiring practices of this particular school district, as well as 55 individual cases of alleged discrimination, the United States brought suit in the United States District Court for the Eastern District of Missouri to enjoin the school district from discriminating based on race. The District Court found in favor of the school district, saying that the ratio of black teachers to white was roughly equivalent to the ratio of black students to white.

The United States appealed to the United States Court of Appeals for the Eighth Circuit, which reversed the District Court's decision. This judgment was based on their decision to disregard the comparison to the student population, and instead compare the Hazelwood hiring statistics to the statistics of the surrounding area, including the St. Louis, MO school districts, saying that those numbers would more accurately reflect the "relevant labor market[.]" Hazelwood appealed to the Supreme Court to review the Court of Appeals decision, arguing that the relevant labor market statistics should not include the St. Louis numbers, because that city had imposed very strict hiring guidelines to help overcome past racial discrimination.

== Judgment ==
The Supreme Court decided that, in this case, the proximity of the questionable hiring statistics to the application of Title VII to public employers was very relevant. The primary reason for the ultimate decision of the Court was that "pre-Act" hiring practices, that were perfectly legal under Title VII until the 1972 amendment, might have caused the statistical disparities in question. Based on that fact and the warning in the recent Teamsters decision that, when considering statistics as evidence of discrimination, all of the facts must be carefully considered, the Court vacated the decision of the Court of Appeals and remanded to the District Court for further proceedings, instructing them to consider whether the pre-Act practices might have played a predominant role in the statistics.

== Significance ==
This case solidified the decision in Teamsters v. United States, where the Court decided that statistics could play a leading role in showing a prima facie case of discrimination under Title VII, but that they must be used with great care. The Teamsters decision was very important in the evolution of disparate impact jurisprudence, and made it much easier for the victims of discrimination to bring cases against their employers. Hazelwood somewhat weakened that decision, however, by noting that statistics which were caused by actions taken legally, before the application of anti-discrimination laws, could not be used in such a way, and that an employer must be given a chance to prove that that might be the case, before a prima facie case can be said to have been established.

== See also ==
- List of United States Supreme Court cases, volume 433
- Hazelwood v. Kuhlmeier
