= Coker v. Georgia =

1977 U.S. Supreme Court case prohibiting the use of capital punishment for adult rape

- Supreme Court of the United States

Argued March 28, 1977 Decided June 29, 1977
- Full case name: Erlich Anthony Coker v. State of Georgia
- Citations: 433 U.S. 584 (more) 97 S. Ct. 2861; 53 L. Ed. 2d 982; 1977 U.S. LEXIS 146

Case history
- Prior: After he escaped from prison, the defendant raped an adult woman. He was convicted and sentenced to death, which was affirmed by the Supreme Court of Georgia, Coker v. State, 234 Ga. 555, 216 S.E.2d 782 (1975); cert. granted, 429 U.S. 815 (1976).

Holding
- The death penalty for the rape of an adult is grossly disproportionate and excessive punishment and so is forbidden by the Eighth Amendment, as cruel and unusual punishment.

Court membership
- Chief Justice Warren E. Burger Associate Justices William J. Brennan Jr. · Potter Stewart; Byron White · Thurgood Marshall; Harry Blackmun · Lewis F. Powell Jr. William Rehnquist · John P. Stevens

Case opinions
- Plurality: White, joined by Stewart, Blackmun, Stevens
- Concurrence: Brennan
- Concurrence: Marshall
- Concur/dissent: Powell
- Dissent: Burger, joined by Rehnquist

Laws applied
- U.S. Const. amends. VIII, XIV

Coker v. Georgia, 433 U.S. 584 (1977) was a United States Supreme Court decision which held that the death penalty for rape of an adult was grossly disproportionate and excessive punishment, and therefore unconstitutional under the Eighth Amendment to the U.S. Constitution.

The Court expanded the ban on death penalty for rape to include rape of a child in the 2008 decision Kennedy v. Louisiana.

== Background ==
In Gregg v. Georgia (1976), the Supreme Court held that the death penalty was not a disproportionate punishment for the crime of murder and was constitutional as long as sentencing was left to the discretion of a jury. Gregg left open the question of the constitutionality of the death penalty for crimes other than murder.

After the Supreme Court overturned McGautha v. California most states were forced to revise their death penalty statutes to comply with Furman v. Georgia, and of the 16 states that allowed the death penalty for rape at that time, most chose to leave it out of their new death penalty laws. At the time of the Coker decision, Georgia was the only state that allowed death penalty for the crime of raping an adult.

== Case history ==
While serving several sentences for rape, kidnapping, one count of first degree murder, and aggravated assault, Ehrlich Anthony Coker escaped from prison. He broke into Allen and Elnita Carver's home near Waycross, Georgia; raped 16 year old Elnita Carver in front of her husband, and stole the family's vehicle. Coker was convicted of rape, armed robbery, and the other offenses.

He was sentenced to death on the rape charge after the jury found two of the aggravating circumstances present for imposing such a sentence: the rape was committed by a person with prior convictions for capital felonies, and the rape was committed in the course of committing another capital felony, the armed robbery. The Supreme Court of Georgia upheld the death sentence.

== Decision ==
Justice White wrote the plurality opinion, on behalf of Justices Stewart, Blackmun, and Stevens.

=== Plurality ===
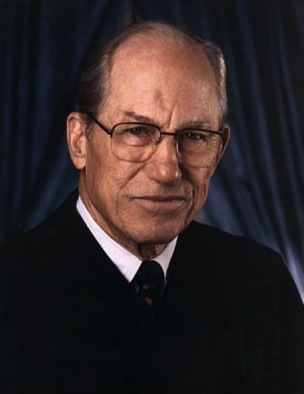
Justice Byron White

The plurality held that death was an unconstitutionally excessive punishment for the crime of raping an adult:

We have the abiding conviction that the death penalty, which is unique in its severity and irrevocability, is an excessive penalty for the rapist who, as such, does not take human life.

The Court said that a punishment was excessive in violation of the Eighth Amendment if it was disproportionate to the severity of the crime or did not serve a meaningful penological purpose such as deterrence.

Coker was the first Supreme Court decision to categorically restrict the death penalty for non-homicide crimes.

The Court acknowledged that rape was a serious crime "very often accompanied by physical injury to the female and can also inflict mental and psychological damage. Because it undermines the community's sense of security, there is public injury as well." The Court said rape, the "ultimate violation of self", was second only to murder in severity. However, they drew a sharp distinction between rape and murder: "Life is over for the victim of the murderer; for the rape victim, life may not be nearly so happy as it was, but it is not over and normally is not beyond repair."

The court ultimately concluded that, "Rape is without doubt deserving of serious punishment; but in terms of moral depravity and of the injury to the person and to the public, it does not compare with murder, which does involve the unjustified taking of human life."

=== Concurring opinion ===
Justices Brennan and Marshall concurred in the judgment because the case struck down a death penalty, in keeping with their view that the death penalty is per se cruel and unusual punishment.

=== Concurring/dissenting ===
Justice Powell concurred in the judgment, but he emphasized that the death penalty may be appropriate for rape if there are aggravating circumstances. He said the plurality opinion was "so sweeping as to foreclose each of the 50 state legislatures from creating a narrowly defined crime of aggravated rape".

=== Dissenting ===
Chief Justice Burger, joined by Justice Rehnquist dissented because he believed that the proportionality principle the Court had engrafted onto the Eighth Amendment encroached too much on the legislative power of the states.

Burger preferred to concentrate on the narrow facts of the case: Coker had raped three women, and killed one. He said making the penalty more severe than the criminal act was constitutionally permissible if the legislative purpose was deterrence:

"Whatever one's view may be as to the State's constitutional power to impose the death penalty upon a rapist who stands before the court convicted for the first time, this case reveals a chronic rapist whose continuing danger to the community is abundantly clear."

Burger defended a state's prerogative to impose additional punishment for recidivists, including a death sentence for prisoners who commit crimes. Congress had enacted an early three-strikes law, and the federal crime of assault on a mail carrier carried a stiffer penalty for a second such offense. Other states also carried harsher penalties for "habitual criminality." He believed that "the Eighth Amendment does not prevent the State from taking an individual's 'well-demonstrated propensity for life-endangering behavior' into account in devising punitive measures which will prevent inflicting further harm upon innocent victims."

He wrote that if the Court was serious about sanctioning the continued use of the death penalty, it should allow states to use it in appropriate circumstances, and disagreed with the Court's conclusion that there were no circumstances under which it was a proportional response to crime. Such a conclusion turned the Court into "the ultimate arbiter of the standards of criminal responsibility in diverse areas of the criminal law throughout the country." That was an inappropriate role for the Court to assume in the American federal system. He felt that Furman had injected enough uncertainty into the debate over capital punishment; it was more expedient to allow subsequent legislative developments to evolve.

Burger disagreed with the Court's assessment of the retribution and deterrence value of the death penalty for rape. He thought that the death penalty might deter at least one prospective rapist. It might encourage victims to report the crime. It might increase the general feeling of security among members of the community. The fact that the magnitude of the harm caused by the murderer is greater than that caused by the rapist was beside the point. The Eighth Amendment was not the Code of Hammurabi; if "innocent life and limb are to be preserved I see no constitutional barrier in punishing by death all who engage in... criminal activity which consistently poses serious danger of death or serious bodily harm." Thus, the Court had no place dictating how the states might make law in the criminal arena.

== Impact ==
The direct consequence was the overturning of the Georgia death sentences of Coker and five other rapists, including John W. Hooks, John W. Eberheart, Donald Boyer, and William J. Hughes. Erlich Coker (his given name is also spelled as Ehrlech, according to the Georgia Department of Corrections; under the GDC ID 0000379279) is still serving multiple life sentences at the Walker State Prison, Georgia as of 2024.

On the basis of Coker, the Florida Supreme Court ruled that Florida capital child rape statutes were unconstitutional in the Robert L. Buford case of 1981 and the Lucious L. Andrews case in 1983. Before his sentence was overturned, Andrews was the last man on death row who had not murdered anyone. The Mississippi Supreme Court overturned Mississippi capital rape statutes in 1989, in its ruling in Leatherwood v. State. It dismissed Alfred D. Leatherwood's death sentence on another basis, the fact that the Louisiana capital aggravators were written to apply only to capital murder and not to rape.

== Subsequent developments ==
After the Court held in Coker v. Georgia that the death penalty was an unconstitutionally disproportionate punishment for the rape of an adult woman some states enacted statutes allowing the death penalty for the rape of a child. This was settled in Kennedy v. Louisiana when the Court applied the "evolving standards of decency" analysis to hold that the death penalty was unconstitutional for the brutal rape of an 8 year old girl. Until Kennedy v. Louisiana, some states were testing the limit of this restriction.

== See also ==
- List of United States Supreme Court cases, volume 433
