= Nchinda =

Nchinda is a surname. Notable people with the surname include:

- Forbi Nchinda (born 1947), Cameroonian politician
- Samuel Nchinda-Kaya (born 1967), Cameroonian sprinter
