= Criminal records in the United States =

Criminal records in the United States contain records of arrests, criminal charges and the disposition of those charges. Criminal records are compiled and updated on local, state, and federal levels by government agencies, most often law enforcement agencies. Their primary purpose is to present a comprehensive criminal history for a specific individual.

Criminal records may be used for many purposes, including for background checks for purposes of employment, security clearance, adoption, immigration to the United States, and licensing. Criminal records may be useful for identifying suspects within the course of a criminal investigation. They may be used for enhanced sentencing in criminal prosecutions.

== Background investigations ==
Criminal history information is generally available to the public, and criminal history information for a specific state can typically be obtained from the state agency that maintains the record. States normally charge a fee for a copy of a person's criminal history. Private individuals can typically obtain copies of their own records, but may need a release in order to obtain the record of another person.

In the United States, any person, including a private investigator, criminal research or background check company, may go to a county courthouse and search an index of criminal records by name and date of birth or have a county clerk search for records on an individual. Such a search may produce information about criminal and non-criminal charges that do not otherwise appear on a state criminal history abstract.

For employment screening purposes, unless state law provides otherwise, criminal convictions may be reported to a potential employer within a 7-year time range from the date of conviction.

== State records ==
State criminal histories are maintained by government agencies, most often by law enforcement agencies. In addition to statewide records, local police departments, sheriffs' offices, and specialty police agencies may maintain their own internal databases. Records are also maintained by state departments of correction, in relation to offenders who have been sentenced to prison or a similar disposition that falls under their jurisdiction. Law enforcement agencies often share criminal history information with other enforcement agencies, and criminal history information is normally also available to the public.

All states have official "statewide repositories" that contain criminal history information contributed by the various county and municipal courts within the state. In some states, minor criminal offenses are not included in the statewide record, or are included only if voluntarily reported by the court in which a conviction occurs.

=== Juvenile records ===
Most states provide some level of protection to juvenile criminal proceedings, and records of adjudication that result from the prosecution of a minor. The extent to which juvenile records are protected varies significantly by state.

=== Sex offender registries ===
Registered sex offenders have information about their crimes or misdemeanors readily available, and Department of Correctional Services in many states disseminate sex offender to the public, through media such as the Internet. The U.S. Department of Justice maintains a national sex offender database.

Some states exclude juveniles from sex offender registries. Adults may be able to petition for exclusion from the registry under state law.

=== Texas ===
In Texas, the Department of Public Safety maintains the Computerized Criminal History System (CCH) and Texas Public Sex Offender Registry. The criteria for inclusion in the CCH is outlined as being convictions and deferred adjudications that are "reported to the Department on an offense."

== Federal records ==
The federal government maintains extensive criminal histories and acts as a central repository for all agencies to report their own data.

=== Department of Justice ===
==== National Crime Information Center ====
The NCIC (National Crime Information Center) is a repository of criminal history information that has been reported to the Federal Bureau of Investigation (FBI). The NCIC stores information regarding open arrest warrants, arrests, stolen property, missing persons, and dispositions regarding felonies and misdemeanors. With a very few exceptions, the records compiled by the federal government within the NCIC are not made available to the private sector.

The FBI's compilation of an individual's criminal identification, arrest, conviction, and incarceration information is known as the Interstate Identification Index, or "Triple-I" for short. This is basically the FBI's rap sheet (Record of Arrest and Prosecution). It contains information voluntarily reported by law enforcement agencies across the country, as well as information provided by other federal agencies. It contains information on felonies and misdemeanors, and may also contain municipal and traffic offenses if reported by the individual agencies.

Each individual who has an entry in the Interstate Identification Index has a unique "FBI number" that is used to identify a specific individual. It compensates for the fact that an individual may provide several false names, or aliases, to a law enforcement agency when he or she is booked. An individual may also lie about his or her date of birth or social security number as well, making an independent, unique identification key necessary.

The information provided by the Interstate Information Index may come from the agency who "booked" the individual and not necessarily the agency who arrested the individual. Therefore, there may be discrepancies between the arrest date, location, and arresting agency listed in the database and the actual date, location, and agency who made the arrest. The Interstate Information Index may also contain incarceration information as well, listing each time an inmate is transferred from one correctional institution to another as a separate "arrest." The Interstate Information Index is only as accurate as the information reported to it by individual agencies, and frequently lacks comprehensive information on the dispositions of the various arrests it lists. It is best used as a guide on where to find more comprehensive information on the individual.

==== National Instant Criminal Background Check System ====
Mandated by the Brady Bill, the National Instant Criminal Background Check System (NICS) is used by the FBI to screen potential firearms buyers. Citizens who are currently ineligible to own a firearm under current laws may have the opportunity to have their firearms rights restored. Eligibility largely depends on state laws. In addition to searching the NCIC databases, NICS maintains its own index to search for additional disqualifiers from gun ownership. Private companies are not allowed access to this system for background checks.

==== Integrated Automated Fingerprint Identification System ====
The FBI maintains the largest biometric database in the world with the Integrated Automated Fingerprint Identification System (IAFIS). Criminal submissions from arrests and civil submissions from authorized background checks are stored in IAFIS. Currently, IAFIS has more than 47 million submissions in its repository.

==== Combined DNA Index System ====
The Combined DNA Index System (CODIS) stores DNA profiles for both convicted felons in the Offender Index as well as unidentified DNA found at crime scenes in the Forensic Index. CODIS was originally piloted in 1990 as a project among 14 states. Currently, all 50 states, Puerto Rico and the United States Government participate in CODIS.

=== Department of Transportation ===
==== National Driver Register ====
While not officially a criminal history repository, the National Driver Register (NDR), operated by the Department of Transportation, maintains information on drivers regarding suspended licenses. The NDR maintains a database of information posted by individual states as mandated by federal law. All drivers who have had their licenses suspended for any reason (including suspensions resulting from several successive minor traffic violations: Massachusetts suspends for three separate speeding tickets over a six-month period) have that information posted by state Registry of Motor Vehicles offices to the NDR.

Also, the NDR records information concerning convictions of driving under the influence of alcohol or controlled substances, failing to render aid at an accident involving death or injury, and knowingly making a false affidavit or committing perjury to officials about an activity governed by a law or regulation on the operation of a motor vehicle. Additionally, the NDR contains information on traffic violations resulting from a fatal automobile accident.

==== Secure Flight ====
Secure Flight, operated by the Transportation Security Administration, screens United States airline passengers to see if they are on terrorism watch lists. Unlike the predecessors Computer Assisted Passenger Prescreening System (CAPPS) & CAPPS II, Secure Flight does not scan passengers for outstanding warrants nor does Secure Flight use computer algorithms to search for links to flagged terrorists.

=== Obtaining copies of federal criminal records ===
It is possible to obtain copies of criminal records maintained by Federal agencies under the Freedom of Information Act and the Privacy Act. In general, you may only obtain records concerning yourself, deceased individuals, or living individuals who have given you their permission to obtain their records.

== Interstate records ==
Most states have a statewide agency that acts as a clearinghouse for all statewide arrest information. These so-called "state rap sheets" are usually much more detailed than the Interstate Identification Index; usually listing not only the arrest information, but the subsequent court action following that arrest.

=== National Law Enforcement Telecommunications System ===
The National Law Enforcement Telecommunications System (NLETS) is an interface to search each state's criminal and driver records as well as the License Plate Reader (LPR) records going back one year maintained by the U.S. Customs and Border Protection (CBP). Thus through NLETS, a law enforcement agency in one state could search for someone's criminal and driver records in another state. NLETS potentially serves as a better tool to search for minor misdemeanors and traffic violations that would not be in the NCIC.

== Expungement ==
In the United States, criminal records may be expunged, though laws vary by state. Many types of offenses may be expunged, ranging from parking fines to felonies. In general, once sealed or expunged, all records of an arrest and/or subsequent court case are removed from the public record, and the individual may legally deny or fail to acknowledge ever having been arrested for or charged with any crime which has been expunged.

However, when applicants for a state professional license or job that is considered a public office or high security (such as security guard, law enforcement, or related to national security) must confess if they have an expunged conviction or else be denied clearance by the DOJ. With few exceptions, there is no post-conviction relief available in the federal system other than a presidential pardon.

== See also ==
- Collateral consequences of criminal conviction in the United States
- Criminal law of the United States
- Human rights in the United States
- Employment discrimination against persons with criminal records in the United States
