= Dwight H. Sullivan =

Dwight H. Sullivan is an American military officer and lawyer. From 2005 to 2007, he served as the Chief Defense Counsel for the Office of Military Commissions.

In 2007, he became a civilian lawyer working for the Air Force doing death penalty defense appellate work. Sullivan has been a colonel in the United States Marine Corps Reserve. He is a graduate of the University of Maryland and the University of Virginia School of Law. Prior to his role in defending the Guantanamo Bay detainees he worked with the Maryland office of the American Civil Liberties Union.

== Work on CAAFlog ==
Sullivan is the founder of CAAFlog, a blog devoted to current topics in U.S. military law and the Uniform Code of Military Justice (UCMJ). CAAFlog derives the first part of its name from the acronym for the Court of Appeals for the Armed Forces (CAAF), an intermediate appellate court with jurisdiction over certain courts-martial in accordance with Article 67 of the UCMJ (Title 10, United States Code, Section 867). CAAFlog currently features over a dozen contributors with experience in the field of U.S. military law.

In 2008, Sullivan spotted an error in the 2008 U.S. Supreme Court decision in Kennedy v. Louisiana. The court wrote that no U.S. federal jurisdiction authorized the death penalty for child rape, but Sullivan pointed out that this was not true because Congress had specifically authorized the death penalty for such offenses as part of the 2006 amendments to the UCMJ. The Supreme Court requested briefs on the issue and subsequently modified its opinion to address the error, but the court denied a rehearing and declined to alter its decision.
