= Dothard v. Rawlinson =

- Supreme Court of the United States

Argued April 19, 1977 Decided June 27, 1977
- Full case name: Dothard, Director, Department of Public Safety of Alabama, et al. v. Dianne Rawlinson, et al.
- Citations: 433 U.S. 321 (more) 97 S. Ct. 2720; 53 L. Ed. 2d 786; 1977 U.S. LEXIS 143; 15 Fair Empl. Prac. Cas. (BNA) 10; 14 Empl. Prac. Dec. (CCH) ¶ 7632

Case history
- Prior: Appeal from the United States District Court for the Middle District of Alabama

Holding
- Under Title VII of the Civil Rights Act of 1964, an employer may not, in the absence of business necessity, set height and weight restrictions that have a disproportionately-adverse effect on one gender.

Court membership
- Chief Justice Warren E. Burger Associate Justices William J. Brennan Jr. · Potter Stewart; Byron White · Thurgood Marshall; Harry Blackmun · Lewis F. Powell Jr. William Rehnquist · John P. Stevens

Case opinions
- Majority: Stewart, joined by Powell, Stevens; Burger, Blackmun, Rehnquist (Parts I & III); Brennan, Marshall (Parts I & II)
- Concurrence: Rehnquist, joined by Burger, Blackmun
- Concur/dissent: Marshall, joined by Brennan
- Dissent: White

Dothard v. Rawlinson, 433 U.S. 321 (1977), was the first United States Supreme Court case in which the bona fide occupational qualifications (BFOQ) defense was used.

== Background ==
In 1977, there were height and weight restrictions (minimum 5’2”, 120 lbs) to be considered as an applicant for an Alabama prison guard. Such requirements ruled out Dianne Rawlinson, who brought forth a class action suit against the requirements under the disparate impact theory of Title VII. After Rawlinson filed her suit, Alabama passed a regulation requiring that guards be the same sex as the inmates. Alabama then had four all-male maximum security prisons and only one all-female prison.

The lower court sided with Rawlinson and claimed that the requirements created an arbitrary barrier to equal employment to women. The state then appealed to the Supreme Court and claimed that the sex, height, and weight requirements were valid occupational qualifications because of the nature of the job.

== Judgment ==
The Court ruled 8-1 that the height and weight restrictions were discriminatory and that the employer had not proven that the height and weight standards were necessary for effective job performance. On the issue of whether women could fill close contact jobs in all male maximum security prisons, the Court ruled 6-3 that the BFOQ defense was legitimate in this case. The reason was that female prison guards were more vulnerable to male sexual attack than male prison guards were.

== See also ==
- US labor law
