= Capital punishment in Cameroon =

Capital punishment is a legal penalty in Cameroon. However, the country has not carried out any official executions since 1997, making it de facto abolitionist, since it also has a moratorium.

== Methods and practices ==
The penal code of Cameroon allows for hanging or the firing squad to be utilized in executions.

Cameroon is a party to the International Covenant on Civil and Political Rights and to the Convention on the Rights of the Child, both of which prohibit member nations from executing people who committed capital crimes before they turned 18, as well as pregnant women and the mothers of infants or small children. In addition, people with severe mental illnesses that render them criminally insane, and people with intellectual disabilities, are generally barred from receiving the death penalty. Inmates in Cameroon with severe mental illnesses or intellectual disabilities may be sentenced to institutionalization in a mental health facility for a maximum of five years instead of being subjected to imprisonment, although whether or not this alternative is available to inmates under death sentences is unclear. Inmates whose criminal insanity is determined to be "not total" may have their death sentences commuted to 2–10 years in prison.

== Pre-independence history ==
Prior to their independence, Cameroon was under dual British and French colonial administration. British Cameroon's political code allowed for the implementation of capital punishment in cases of murder, treason, treachery, and participation in a trial by ordeal leading to a suspect's death. The French section of Cameroon only allowed capital punishment in two situations, rather than British Cameroon's four: attacks on internal state security, and, starting in 1947, murder for the purposes of cannibalism.

Some Cameroonians still handed down traditional death sentences and executions beyond the control of colonists, and often without colonists' knowledge, in cases of theft or cutting bamboo at night; the purported sentence for theft was hanging or being thrown alive in a pit, while the purported sentence for cutting bamboo was to be tied upside down to a tree until death. Men found guilty of adultery were sometimes burned alive or stoned, while women were sold into slavery or thrown into the same pit for people convicted of thievery.

== Post-independence developments ==
In the first years following independence, Cameroon sought to use the death penalty as a deterrence to organized crime; then-President Ahmadou Ahidjo signed several orders that were passed without parliamentary approval in 1972, wherein aggravated theft and burglary were punishable by death. Under these laws, judges were prohibited from applying aggravating or mitigating circumstances and considering each case on an individual basis. 1972 also saw the introduction of military courts, which increasingly played a role in implementing capital punishment. It is unknown how many people were sentenced to death under the aggravated theft legislation from 1972 to 1990, when the laws were amended.

Following Ahidjo's resignation and ceding of power to then-Prime Minister and current President Paul Biya in 1982, there were two attempted coup d'états attempting to reinstate former president Ahidjo. The first took place in August 1983. Those deemed responsible faced military courts, including Ahidjo, who was in exile in France and was therefore put on trial in absentia. Two collaborators, identified as Ahidjo's quartermaster and aide-de-camp, pleaded guilty, and they and Ahidjo were sentenced to death on 28 February 1984. Weeks later, on 16 March, their death sentences were commuted to life imprisonment.

A second coup attempt, which was carried out on 6 April 1984 and also attributed to former president Ahidjo and his supporters, resulted in many arrests. The trials of those accused of involvement in the second coup took place before a military tribunal between 27 and 30 April 1984, with at least 35 of the accused parties being convicted, sentenced to death, and summarily executed between May and August 1984. Many others were sentenced to terms of imprisonment, but on 17 January 1991, all parties involved in the second coup attempt were granted amnesty. In both attempted coup cases, President Biya was accused of exploiting the death penalty to consolidate power and shape his public perception.

== Most recent executions ==
The death penalty has only sparingly been used since the second coup attempt. Only two executions have been carried out in Cameroon since 1984. The first execution was a double execution that took place on 28 August 1988, and the convicts, identified only as Njomzeu and Oumbe, were convicted of the 1979 murder of the Mpondo family, a violent crime involving "bloodshed with aggravating circumstances." The men were subjected to a public execution by firing squad in Douala, with 24 soldiers, twelve for each man, appointed to carry out the executions. Reportedly, both men required a coup de grâce.

The most recent execution confirmed to have taken place in Cameroon was on 9 January 1997, when an inmate identified as Antoine Vandi Tize was executed by firing squad in Mokolo, a city in the Mayo-Tsanaga division of the Far North Region. Tize had been on death row in Cameroon for approximately seven years after his conviction for murder, and he was detained at the Central Prison in Maroua before his transfer to the site where his execution took place. The execution of Tize was the first verified to have taken place in the country since 1988. Other executions possibly took place that year, but they were unconfirmed.

== Recent developments ==
Despite not carrying out any executions since 1997, Cameroon has moved to expand their death penalty law. In December 2014, President Biya declared his intention to introduce the death penalty for terrorism; President Biya declared that this decision came in light of increased violence from Boko Haram insurgents from bordering Nigeria and that his desire was to curb collaboration with them. The law attracted criticism from human rights organizations and others, such as the religious organization Ecumenical Service for Peace, who were concerned that the law would instead serve to curb political dissent. Those who worried that the law would result in violations of individuals' human rights pointed out that Cameroon has a history of using the criminal justice system to suppress political criticism and expository journalism; one of the provisions of the capital punishment bill also provided for criminalizing reporting on certain instances of terrorism due to concerns that their work could "destabilize the country" and punishing that reporting with up to 15 years in jail. Some, such as Forbi Nchinda, a member of the Social Democratic Front, the oppositional party to the President's, called the law outdated; Nchinda criticized the law for reviving capital punishment when many countries were moving towards limiting and abolishing capital punishment, saying, "The world is moving away from the death penalty. Now they are using the death penalty for people who are accused of terrorism. That is unacceptable the world over. Even in Cameroon, I don't think for the past 20 years anybody has been executed because the tendency has been to move away from the death penalty." The law, formally titled The Law on the Suppression of Acts of Terrorism in Cameroon, passed on 19 December 2014.

In March 2016, a military court condemned to death 89 Boko Haram insurgents who were convicted for terrorist attacks in Cameroon's Far North Region. Their death sentence was handed down under the new anti-terrorism law passed in 2014.

In November 2018, the NGO Réseau des avocats camerounais contre la peine de mort (Racopem) estimated that there were 330 people under a death sentence in Cameroon, including more than one hundred for terrorism-related offenses.

On 7 September 2021, the Centre for Human Rights and Democracy in Africa demanded that the government of Cameroon respect the human rights of four death row inmates who were condemned to death, demanding that the government assure their right to appeal the verdict or apply for a commutation or pardon. A military tribunal sentenced the four to death by firing squad for charges related to murder, terrorism, secession, insurrection, "hostility against the fatherland," and illegal possession of firearms due to their involvement in an 24 October 2020 attack on a school in Kumba, resulting in the deaths of six children.

The most recent monitoring by ECPM (Together Against the Death Penalty) shows that just over one hundred individuals are believed to be in death row in Cameroon as of the end of 2025.

== Issues and criticism ==
Cameroon's capital trial system has garnered criticism because many capital trials take a long time to complete. Cameroonian defence attorneys have complained that the number of adjournments and delays leads to it being difficult to secure witnesses to testify and that this therefore jeopardizes capital defendants' rights to a fair trial.

Cameroonian judges are often reluctant to grant bail to suspects in capital cases. Some defendants have alleged that police subjected them to torture before their trials. Some have claimed that the police treated them as if they were guilty before they went to trial, therefore violating their right to be presumed innocent.
