= Texas Department of Housing and Community Affairs v. Inclusive Communities Project, Inc. =

Texas Dept. of Housing and Community Affairs v. Inclusive Communities Project, Inc.
- Supreme Court of the United States

Argued January 21, 2015 Decided June 25, 2015
- Full case name: Texas Department of Housing and Community Affairs et al. v. Inclusive Communities Project, Inc., et al.
- Docket no.: 13-1371
- Citations: 576 U.S. 519 (more) 135 S. Ct. 2507; 192 L. Ed. 2d 514
- Argument: Oral argument
- Opinion announcement: Opinion announcement

Holding
- Disparate impact claims are cognizable under the Fair Housing Act.

Court membership
- Chief Justice John Roberts Associate Justices Antonin Scalia · Anthony Kennedy; Clarence Thomas · Ruth Bader Ginsburg; Stephen Breyer · Samuel Alito; Sonia Sotomayor · Elena Kagan

Case opinions
- Majority: Kennedy, joined by Ginsburg, Breyer, Sotomayor, Kagan
- Dissent: Thomas
- Dissent: Alito, joined by Roberts, Scalia, Thomas

Laws applied
- Fair Housing Act

Texas Dept. of Housing and Community Affairs v. Inclusive Communities Project, Inc., 576 U.S. 519 (2015), was a United States Supreme Court case in which the Court analyzed whether disparate impact claims are cognizable under the Fair Housing Act. In Justice Anthony Kennedy's majority opinion, the Court held that Congress specifically intended to include disparate impact claims in the Fair Housing Act, but that such claims require a plaintiff to prove it is the defendant's policies that cause a disparity.

== Background ==
The Federal Government provides tax credits for developers who build low income housing. These credits are administered by designated state agencies, and preference is given for the development of housing in low-income areas. The Inclusive Communities Project is a Texas-based non-profit organization that helps low-income families obtain affordable housing. In 2008, they filed suit against the Texas agency responsible for administering these tax credits, claiming it disproportionately allocated too many tax credits "in predominantly black inner-city areas and too few in predominantly white suburban neighborhoods." To support their claim, the Inclusive Communities Project cited statistics that showed "92.29% of [low-income housing tax credit] units in the city of Dallas were located in census tracts with less than 50% Caucasian residents." Both the District Court and the United States Court of Appeals for the Fifth Circuit ruled in favor of the Inclusive Communities Project, holding that disparate impact claims are cognizable under the Fair Housing Act. The Texas Department of Housing and Community then appealed to the Supreme Court of the United States.

== Opinion of the Court ==
=== Majority opinion ===
Justice Anthony Kennedy delivered the opinion of the Court, which in a 5–4 decision held that disparate impact claims are cognizable under the Fair Housing Act. Justice Kennedy began his analysis by reviewing the historic development of disparate impact claims in federal law and concluded that Congress specifically intended to include disparate impact liability in a series of amendments to the Fair Housing Act that were enacted in the year 1988. Justice Kennedy also argued that "[r]ecognition of disparate-impact liability under the FHA also plays a role in uncovering discriminatory intent: It permits plaintiffs to counteract unconscious prejudices and disguised animus that escape easy classification as disparate treatment." However, Justice Kennedy also held that housing authorities and private developers should have an opportunity to defend against disparate impact claims by stating and explaining "the valid interest served by their policies." Justice Kennedy also cautioned that "a disparate-impact claim that relies on a statistical disparity must fail if the plaintiff cannot point to a defendant’s policy or policies causing that disparity."

=== Dissenting opinions ===
Justice Samuel Alito issued a dissenting opinion, joined by Chief Justice John Roberts, Justice Antonin Scalia, and Justice Clarence Thomas. Justice Alito argued that the Fair Housing Act never authorized such disparate impact claims in 1968, when the law was enacted, "[a]nd nothing has happened since then to change the law's meaning". Justice Thomas also issued a separate dissenting opinion in which he questioned Justice Kennedy's reliance upon Griggs v. Duke Power Co. to support the conclusion that the Fair Housing Act permits disparate impact claims.

== See also ==
- List of United States Supreme Court cases, volume 576
- List of United States Supreme Court cases
