= Whalen v. Roe =

- Supreme Court of the United States

Argued October 13, 1976 Decided February 22, 1977
- Full case name: Whalen, Commissioner of Health of New York v. Roe, et al.
- Citations: 429 U.S. 589 (more) 97 S. Ct. 869; 51 L. Ed. 2d 64; 1977 U.S. LEXIS 42

Case history
- Prior: Roe v. Ingraham, 403 F. Supp. 931 (S.D.N.Y. 1975); probable jurisdiction noted, 424 U.S. 907 (1976).

Holding
- Reversed the District Court, holding that the New York Statutes requiring the collection and storage of a patient's identifying information did not violate a citizen's constitutional right to privacy and it is within the State's police power to collect such information in an attempt to stop illegal drug distribution.

Court membership
- Chief Justice Warren E. Burger Associate Justices William J. Brennan Jr. · Potter Stewart; Byron White · Thurgood Marshall; Harry Blackmun · Lewis F. Powell Jr. William Rehnquist · John P. Stevens

Case opinions
- Majority: Stevens, joined by unanimous
- Concurrence: Brennan
- Concurrence: Stewart

Whalen v. Roe, 429 U.S. 589 (1977), was a case brought before the Supreme Court of the United States. The case involved a New York state prescription monitoring law requiring reporting and storing of information concerning all Schedule II drug prescriptions. Physicians were required to report the name of the prescribing physician; the dispensing pharmacy; the drug and dosage; and the patient's name, address, and age. This information was then stored by the New York Department of State.

A group of patients, several doctors who prescribe such drugs, and two associations of physicians brought suit against the New York State Department of Health commissioner, seeking to enjoin the State from enforcing the Act.

A three-judge panel of the United States District Court for the Southern District of New York, held the statutes unconstitutional and enjoined enforcement of the challenged provisions. On appeal, the Supreme Court reversed the decision of the district court, holding that the statutes were within the state's police power. The Supreme Court held that the state need not show the State action was necessary to solve the identified problem and that there was no basis for assuming that the state security provisions would be improperly administered. The Court dismissed the plaintiff's key concerns, holding that the statutes would not significantly deter patients from seeking necessary medication nor would the statutes impair physicians' right to practice medicine free from unwarranted state interference.

== Background and prior history ==
In 1970, the New York Legislature created a special commission to evaluate the State's drug-control laws and their effectiveness in combating the illegal distribution and use of dangerous yet legal prescription drugs. The commission found that the existing law was ineffective in preventing the use of stolen or revised prescriptions, in preventing pharmacists from refilling exhausted prescriptions, in preventing drug users from obtaining multiple physicians' prescriptions, or in preventing doctors from over-prescribing.

In 1972, the New York Legislature enacted a statutory scheme to address this problem. These statutes required that physicians write all prescriptions on an official form. This form included the physician’s name, the dispensing pharmacy, the drug and dosage; and the patient's name, address, and age. A copy of the form was to be forwarded to the New York State Department of Health. There the form would be recorded and the information would be stored for a period of five years. Public disclosure of the information was strictly prohibited and the state had certain safeguards in place to secure the data.

Challenging the constitutionality of these statutes, a group of patients and doctors brought a cause of action seeking to enjoin the state from enforcing the statutes. The U.S. District Court for the Southern District of New York held for the plaintiffs, finding that the statutes invaded the constitutionally protected zone of privacy of the doctor-patient relationship. The District Court enjoined the State from enforcing certain sections of the New York State Controlled Substance Act of 1972, to protect patient identity. The District Court based its ruling on the theory that the State had failed to show a necessity for the patient identification requirement and without a necessity, the State action unconstitutionally invaded personal privacy.

== Oral Arguments ==
The Court heard oral arguments for the case on October 13, 1976. Assistant Attorney General A. Seth Greenwald argued the case for the appellant, the State of New York. Attorneys H. Miles Jaffe and Michael Lesch argued for the appellees.

== Majority opinion ==
In 1977 the United States Supreme Court reversed the District Court's holding. Justice Stevens wrote that the opinion of the Court held that State legislation is not unconstitutional merely because it is not found to be necessary. Rejecting the District Court's analysis of Lochner v. New York, Justice Stevens held that it is within the State's police power to enact legislation that attempts to deal with crime, such as the drug distribution problem in this case.

Justice Stevens identified two different privacy interests which may be constitutionally protected: the interest of controlling the disclosure of personal matters and the interest of being able to make certain personal decisions free from government influence. While Justice Stevens agreed with the Appellees that both of these interests may be affected by the statutes, Justice Stevens held that neither interest would be significantly impaired by the statutes. Looking at the evidence before the court, Justice Stevens found that the increased risk of public disclosure was minimal compared to existing law and that patients’ decisions to receive these drugs would be largely unaffected by having to provide identifying information.

Justice Stevens dismissed the group of doctors' arguments, stating that existing law already required doctors to prepare a written prescription with predominantly the same information. Justice Stevens goes on to hold that any other concerns about patient decisions and the doctor patient relationship were covered in his discussion of patient privacy interests.

Finally, while acknowledging legitimate privacy concerns arising from government storage of citizens' personal information, Justice Stevens limited the holding to the specific facts in this case. He recognized that there might be valid constitutional issues should there be unwarranted disclosure of such private information, however this was not the case here.

=== Brennan's concurrence ===
While Justice Brennan agrees with the majority that the disclosure of patient information required by physicians pursuant to the New York statute to a limited number of public health officials has been historically prevalent and one not traditionally viewed as an invasion of privacy, he still expresses his concern with regards to the manner in which the statute mandates the information be stored-in a central computer. He concedes that simply because a new technology makes such information gathering more efficient, that alone cannot render the statute unconstitutional. However, in referring to the Fourth Amendment, he notes that there are constitutional limits to the kind of information that the State may collect and the manner in which it is collected.

To Brennan, the development of computerized data and the ease with which computers can store large amounts of data poses an increased risk of misappropriation of such data. As such, Justice Brennan demonstrates his unwillingness to foreclose on the possibility that future circumstances might require similar limitations on technology in relation to privacy law as the Court has imposed on Fourth Amendment law.

Nonetheless, Brennan points out that the New York statute had, based on the facts of the case before him, sufficiently protected the privacy interests of those patients in their information. Without an actual showing that the statute’s procedural safeguards have been ineffective in ensuring patients are not deprived of their privacy interests, the state could not be compelled to show that the collection of the data is absolutely necessary to control illegal drug use.

=== Stewart's concurrence ===
Justice Stewart points out that the Court noted in Katz v. United States that the Constitution does not provide individuals with any right to privacy. Rather, the constitution merely provides protection to individuals from government intrusion pursuant to the Fourth Amendment. As a result, Justice Stewart takes exception to Justice Brennan's implication that had there been some dissemination of the information collected in accordance with the New York statute the state would have to show that the statute is necessary to achieving its compelling state interest-curtailing illegal drug use. Stewart qualified his concurrence by indicating he agreed with the majority's decision but that he agreed based on the assumption that the majority's was not contravening its precedent in Katz: the Constitution does not afford individuals any right to privacy.

=== Subsequent developments ===
Brennan's concurrence was prescient in some regards as increasingly advanced computer technology continues to develop while generating growing concerns about how private information is collected, particularly pertaining to health and medical records. These concerns were reflected by Congress when it passed the Health Insurance Portability and Accountability Act in 1996. The Act's overall objective was to provide national standards for electronic healthcare transactions, but the relevant part of the Act is Title II, which regulates how personal medical information can be used and disclosed by specifically outlined entities under the Act, such as healthcare providers.

== See also ==
- List of United States Supreme Court cases, volume 429
