= Chief Defense Counsel (United States) =

The Chief Defense Counsel is a United States Department of Defense military position created by the Military Commissions Act of 2006 to supervise military and civilian defense attorneys for Guantanamo Bay detention camp prisoners in the Guantanamo military commission. The Office of the Chief Defense Counsel is a component of the Office of Military Commissions.

Colonel Dwight H. Sullivan, United States Marine Corps Reserve, was Chief Defense Counsel from 2005 to 2007. The current Chief Defense Counsel is Brigadier General Jackie L. Thompson Jr., U.S. Army.

In April 2013, Colonel Karen Mayberry, USAF, the Chief Defense Counsel at the time, ordered all attorneys under her supervision to stop using the military computer system because emails and files were made available to the prosecution. On September 18, 2013, Colonel Mayberry testified about the breaches of defense computer systems in the Guantanamo military commission.

Following revelations in April 2014 that the Federal Bureau of Investigation was investigating defense teams, Military Judge James Pohl ordered the Chief Defense Counsel to appoint independent counsel for Khalid Sheikh Mohammad and Ramzi bin al-Shibh to investigate a possible conflict of interest. Later, Military Judge Pohl rescinded the order for independent counsel for Mohammad and severed bin al Shibh from the 9/11 military commission trial, citing questions of bin al Shibh's competency to stand trial and the possible conflict of interest.
