= Prescription monitoring program =

In the United States, prescription monitoring programs (PMPs) or prescription drug monitoring programs (PDMPs) are state-run programs which collect and distribute data about the prescription and dispensation of federally controlled substances and, depending on state requirements, other potentially abusable prescription drugs. PMPs are meant to help prevent adverse drug-related events such as opioid overdoses, drug diversion, and substance abuse by decreasing the amount and/or frequency of opioid prescribing, and by identifying those patients who are obtaining prescriptions from multiple providers (i.e., "doctor shopping") or those physicians overprescribing opioids.

Most US health care workers support the idea of PMPs, which intend to assist physicians, physician assistants, nurse practitioners, dentists and other prescribers, the pharmacists, chemists and support staff of dispensing establishments. The database, whose use is required by State law, typically requires prescribers and pharmacies dispensing controlled substances to register with their respective state PMPs and (for pharmacies and providers who dispense from their offices) to report the dispensation of such prescriptions to an electronic online database. The majority of PMPs are authorized to notify law enforcement agencies or licensing boards or physicians when a prescriber, or patients receiving prescriptions, exceed thresholds established by the state or prescription recipient exceeds thresholds established by the State. All states have implemented PDMPs, although evidence for the effectiveness of these programs is mixed. While prescription of opioids has decreased with PMP use, overdose deaths in many states have actually increased, with those states sharing data with neighboring jurisdictions or requiring reporting of more drugs experiencing highest increases in deaths. This may be because those declined opioid prescriptions turn to street drugs, whose potency and contaminants carry greater overdose risk.

== History ==
Prescription drug monitoring programs, or PDMPs, are an example of one initiative proposed to alleviate effects of the opioid crisis. The programs are designed to restrict prescription drug abuse by limiting a patient's ability to obtain similar prescriptions from multiple providers (i.e. “doctor shopping”) and reducing diversion of controlled substances. This is meant to reduce risk of fatal overdose caused by high doses of opioids or interactions between opioids and benzodiazepenes, and to enable better decision making on the part of healthcare providers who may be unaware of a patient's prescription drug use, history or other prescriptions.

PDMPs have been implemented in state legislations since 1939 in California, a time before electronic medical records, though implementation rose alongside increased awareness of overprescribing of opioids and overdose. A later New York state program was struck down by the U.S. Supreme Court in Whalen v. Roe. But, by 2019, 49 states, the District of Columbia, and Guam had enacted PDMP legislation. In 2021 Missouri, the last State to not use a PMP, adopted legislation to create one.

PMPs are constantly being updated to increase speed of data collection, sharing of data across States, and ease of interpretation. This is being done by integrating PDMP reports with other health information technologies such as health information exchanges (HIE), electronic health record (EHR) systems, and/ or pharmacy dispensing software systems. One program that has been implemented in nine states is called the PDMP Electronic Health Records Integration and Interoperability Expansion, also known as PEHRIIE. Another software, marketed by Bamboo Health and integrated with PMPs in 43 states, uses an algorithm to track factors thought to increase risk of diversion, abuse or overdose, and assigns patients a three digit score based on presumed indicators of risk. While some studies have suggested that PDMP-HIT integration and sharing of interstate data brings benefits such as reduced opioid-related inpatient morbidity, others have found no or negative impact on mortality compared to states without PMP data sharing. Patient and media reports suggest need for testing and evaluation of algorithmic software used to score risk, with some patients reporting denial of prescriptions without c explanation or clarity of data.

== Goals ==
Most health care workers support PMPs which intend to assist physicians, physician assistants, nurse practitioners, dentists and other prescribers, the pharmacists, chemists and support staff of dispensing establishments, as well as law-enforcement agencies. The collaboration supports the legitimate medical use of controlled substances while limiting their abuse and diversion. Pharmacies dispensing controlled substances and prescribers typically must register with their respective state PMPs and (for pharmacies and providers who dispense controlled substances from their offices) report the dispensation to an electronic online database. Some pharmacy software can submit these reports automatically to multiple states.

== Usage ==
=== List of programs by state ===
State Name	State Code	Format	Method	Reporting Agency	Schedules Monitored	Documentation	State Frequency	Data Retention
Alaska	AK	ASAP 2009 v4.1	sFTP	Appriss:855-525-4767	2 - 5	Source	Monthly	2 Source
Alabama	AL	ASAP 2007 v4.0	sFTP	Health Information Design Phone: 334.502.3262	2 - 5	Source	Daily	?
Arkansas	AR	ASAP 2011 v4.2	sFTP	Health Information Design Phone: 334.502.3262	?	?	Weekly	?
Arizona	AZ	ASAP 2011 v4.2	sFTP	Health Information Design Phone: 334.502.3262	2 - 4 + Carisoprodol	Source	Daily	Adult 6 / Minor 3 Source
California	CA	ASAP 2009 v4.1	sFTP	Atlantic Associates, Inc Phone: 800.539.3370	2 - 4	Source	Weekly	3 Source
Colorado	CO	ASAP 2012 v4.2	sFTP	Health Information Design Phone: 334.502.3262	2 - 5	Source	Bi-Weekly	?
Connecticut	CT	ASAP 4.2	FTPs	Appriss:855-525-4767	2 - 5	Source	Bi-Weekly	?
District of Columbia	DC	ASAP 4.2	?	?	?	?	?	?
Delaware	DE	ASAP 2011 v4.2	sFTP	Health Information Design Phone 334.502.3262	2 - 5	Source	Daily	?
Florida	FL	ASAP 2009 v4.2	sFTP	Health Information Design Phone: 334.502.3262	2 - 4	Source	Weekly	?
Georgia	GA	ASAP 2011 V4.2	?	Appriss:855-525-4767	?	?	?	1 Source
Hawaii	HI	ASAP 2009 v4.2	Web Portal	Appriss:855-525-4767	2 - 5 + Carisoprodol	Source	Weekly	https://hipdmpreporting.hidinc.com/
Idaho	ID	ASAP 2009 v4.1	sFTP	Appriss:855-525-4767	2 - 5	Source	Weekly	?
Illinois	IL	ASAP 2007 v4.0	sFTP	Atlantic Associates, Inc Phone: 800.539.3370	2 - 5	Source	Weekly	2 Source
Indiana	IN	ASAP 2007 v4.2	FTPs	INSPECT Phone: 317.234.4458 Phone:866.683.2476	2 - 5 + Carisoprodol (SOMA)		Daily	?
Iowa	IA	ASAP v4.1	FTPs	Optimum Technology, Inc Phone: 866.683.2476	2 - 4	Source	Bi-Weekly	4 Source
Kansas	KS	ASAP 2009 v4.1	sFTP	Appriss:855-525-4767	2 - 4 + Drugs of Concern	Source	Daily	?
Kentucky	KY	ASAP 2009 v4.1	sFTP	Health Information Design Phone: 334.502.3262	2 - 5 + Carisoprodol, Tramadol	Source	Daily	5 Source
Louisiana	LA	ASAP 4.2	sFTP	Appriss:855-525-4767	2 - 5 + Tramadol, Butalibtal, Carisoprodol, Ephedrine, Pseudoephedrine, PPA	Source	Weekly	?
Massachusetts	MA	ASAP 2009 v4.1	sFTP	Appriss:855-525-4767	2 - 5	Source	Weekly	?
Maryland	MD	ASAP 2011 V4.2	sFTP	Health Information Design Phone: 334.502.3262	2 - 4	Source	Weekly	?
Maine	ME	ASAP 2009 v4.1	sFTP	Appriss:855-525-4767	2 - 4	Source	Bi-Weekly	6 Source
Michigan	MI	ASAP 2009 v4.1	Web Portal	Michigan Automated Prescription System (MAPS) Source	2 - 5	Source	Bi-Weekly	?
Minnesota	MN	ASAP 2007 v4.0	sFTP	Health Information Design Phone: 334.502.3262	2 - 4 + Codeine containing cough syrups that are schedule 5 federally are schedule 3 in MN; Human growth hormones are schedule 3 in MN.	Source	Daily	1 Source
Missouri	MO	ASAP 4.2	?	?	?	?	?	3 Source
Mississippi	MS	ASAP 2005 v3.0	sFTP	Appriss:855-525-4767	2 - 5 + Butalbital, Carisoprodol, Soma, Tramadol Powder, Ultracet, Ultram ER, Ryzolt ER.		Weekly	?
Montana	MT	ASAP 4.2	sFTP	Montana Prescription Drug Registry	?	?	Weekly	?
North Carolina	NC	ASAP 4.2	sFTP	Health Information Design Phone: 334.502.3262	2 - 5	Source	Weekly	6 Source
North Dakota	ND	ASAP 2009 v4.1	sFTP	Health Information Design Phone: 334.502.3262	2 - 5 + Tramadol, Carisoprodol	Source	Daily	?
Nebraska	NE	ASAP 4.2	?	?	?	?	?	?
New Hampshire	NH	ASAP 4.2	sFTP	Appriss:855-525-4767	2 - 5 + Tramadol, Carisoprodol	nhpdmpreporting.hidinc.com	Daily	?
New Jersey	NJ	ASAP 2009 v4.1	sFTP	Appriss:855-525-4767	2 - 5 and HCG		Weekly	?
New Mexico	NM	ASAP 2009 v4.1	Web Portal	Appriss:855-525-4767	2 - 4 + Butalbital (Fioricet), Carisoprodol (Soma), Dezocine (Dalgan), Flunitrazepam (Rohypnol), Nalbuphine (Nubain), Pseudoephedrine (Sudafed)	Source	Weekly	?
Nevada	NV	ASAP 2005 v3.0	sFTP	Appriss:855-525-4767	2 - 4 + Carisoprodol	Source	Weekly	?
New York	NY	ASAP 2007 v4.0	Web Portal	New York (DOH & BNDD) Phone: 866.811.7957	2 - 5 + Chorionic Gonadotropin, HCG	Source	Daily	5 Source
Ohio	OH	ASAP 2009 v4.1	sFTP	Ohio Automated Rx Reporting System (OARRS) Phone: 614.466.4143	2 - 5 + Carisoprodol, Tramadol	Source	Daily	2 Source
Oklahoma	OK	ASAP 2019 v4.2b	Web Service	Appriss:855-525-4767	2 - 5 + Tramadol	Source	Within 5 Minutes	?
Oregon	OR	ASAP 2009 v4.1	sFTP	Health Information Design Phone: 334.502.3262	2 - 4	?	Weekly	3 Source
Pennsylvania	PA	ASAP 2007 v4.0	FTPs	Appriss:855-525-4767	2 + ephedrine, pseudoephedrine, phenylpropanolamine, PSE	?	Monthly	?
Rhode Island	RI	ASAP 4.2	Web Portal	Prescription Monitoring Program (PMP) Phone: 401.222.2840	2 - 3	Source	Monthly	?
South Carolina	SC	ASAP 4.2	sFTP	Appriss:855-525-4767	2 - 4	Source	Monthly	?
South Dakota	SD	ASAP 2009 v4.1	sFTP	Appriss:855-525-4767	2 - 4	?	Weekly	?
Tennessee	TN	ASAP 2009 v4.1	FTPs	Optimum Technology, Inc Phone: 866.683.2476	2 - 5	Source	Bi-Weekly	?
Texas	TX	ASAP 2009 v4.1	FTPs	Appriss:855-525-4767	2 - 5 + Carisoprodol	Source	Bi-Weekly	1 Source
Utah	UT	ASAP 4.2	Web Portal	Utah Controlled Substance Database Program Phone: 801.530.6232	2 - 5 + butalbital w/acetaminophen	Source	Daily	UCA 58-37f
Virginia	VA	ASAP 2009 v4.1	FTPs	Appriss:855-525-4767	2 - 4	Source	Bi-Weekly	?
Vermont	VT	ASAP 2005 v3.0	sFTP	Appriss:855-525-4767	2 - 4	?	Weekly	6 Source
Washington	WA	ASAP 2011 v4.2	sFTP	Health Information Design Phone: 334.502.3262	2 - 5	Source	Weekly	?
Wisconsin	WI	ASAP 2011 v4.2	?	?	2-5 + Tramadol	?	?	?
West Virginia	WV	ASAP 4.2	Web Portal	West Virginia Board of Pharmacy	2 -4	Source	?	?
Wyoming	WY	ASAP 4.2	sFTP	Atlantic Associates, Inc. Phone: 800.539.3370	2 - 4 + Tramadol, Carisoprodol	Source	Weekly	?

=== Software systems ===
NarxCare is a prescription drug monitoring program (PDMP) run by Bamboo Health. Bamboo Health was formerly known as Appriss. It is widely used across the United States by pharmacies including Rite Aid as well as those at Walmart and Sam’s Club. The NarxCare software allows doctors to view data about a patient, combining data from the prescription registries of various U.S. states to make the registries interoperable nationally. It also uses machine learning to generate an "Overdose Risk Score" that potentially includes EMS and criminal justice data; these scores have been criticized by researchers and patient advocates for the lack of transparency in the process as well as the potential for disparate treatment of women and minority groups.

Advertised as an "analytics tool and care management platform", the NarxCare software allows doctors to view data about a patient including how many pharmacies they have visited and the combinations of medication they are prescribed. It combines data from the prescription registries of various U.S. states, making the registries interoperable nationally. It additionally uses machine learning to generate various three-digit "risk scores" and an overall "Overdose Risk Score", collectively referred to as Narx Scores, in a process that potentially includes EMS and criminal justice data as well as court records.

== Controversy ==
Many doctors and researchers support the idea of PDMPs as a tool in combatting the opioid epidemic. Opioid prescribing, opioid diversion and supply, opioid misuse, and opioid-related morbidity and mortality are common elements in data entered into PDMPs. Prescription Monitoring Programs are purported to offer economic benefits for the states who implement them by decreasing overall health care costs, lost productivity, and investigation times.

However, there are many studies that conclude the impact of PDMPs is unclear. While use of PMPs has been accompanied by decrease in opioid prescribing, few analyses consider corresponding use of street opioids, extramedical use, or diversion, which might provide a more holistic method for evaluation of PMP intent and efficacy. Evidence for PDMP impact on fatal overdoses is decidedly mixed, with multiple studies finding increased overdose rates in some states, decreases in others, or no clear impact. Interestingly, an increase in heroin overdoses after PDMP implementation has been commonly reported, presumably as denial of prescription opioids sends patients in search of street drugs.

Narx Scores have been criticized by researchers and patient advocates for the lack of transparency in the generation process as well as the potential for disparate treatment of women and minority groups. Writing in Duke Law Journal, Jennifer Oliva stated that "black-box algorithms" are used to generate the scores.
