= E. Joshua Rosenkranz =

American lawyer

E. Joshua Rosenkranz (born 1961) is an American lawyer who is head of the Supreme Court and appellate practice at the law firm Orrick, Herrington & Sutcliffe. He has been named "litigator of the year" by American Lawyer in 2012, 2018, and 2025, making him the only lawyer to receive this honor three times.

Rosenkranz received his bachelor's degree from Case Western Reserve University in 1983 and his J.D. from Georgetown University Law Center in 1986. He was a law clerk to Supreme Court Justice William J. Brennan, Jr. during the Court's 1987–1988 term. He founded the New York Office of the Appellate Defender in 1988, and served as its president and CEO from 1992 to 1996. In 1994, he became the founding president of the Brennan Center for Justice at New York University School of Law.
