= Business necessity =

A business necessity is a legal term for a legitimate business purpose that justifies an employment decision as effective and needed to optimally achieve the organization's goals and ensure that operations run safely and efficiently. This is often presented as a defense of an employment decision that is questioned because it was found to cause disparate impact.

== United States law ==
In Griggs v. Duke Power Co. (1971), the United States Supreme Court held that an employment practice which is nondiscriminatory "on its face", but which has a "disparate impact" in its operation is unlawful under Title VII of the Civil Rights Act of 1964, unless the employer is able to show that the practice is a "business necessity". The term "business necessity" does not actually appear in the 1964 Act, but the codification of the doctrine is stated to be one of the purposes of the Civil Rights Act of 1991:

(2) to codify the concepts of "business necessity" and "job related" enunciated by the Supreme Court in Griggs v. Duke Power Co., 401 U.S. 424 (1971), and in the other Supreme Court decisions prior to Wards Cove Packing Co. v. Atonio, 490 U.S. 642 (1989).
