= Village of Arlington Heights v. Metropolitan Housing Development Corp. =

- Supreme Court of the United States

Argued October 13, 1976 Decided January 11, 1977
- Full case name: Village of Arlington Heights, et al. v. Metropolitan Housing Development Corporation, et al.
- Citations: 429 U.S. 252 (more) 97 S. Ct. 555; 50 L. Ed. 450

Case history
- Prior: 373 F. Supp. 208 (N.D. Ill. 1974); 517 F.2d 409 (7th Cir. 1975)
- Subsequent: 616 F.2d 1006 (7th Cir. 1980)

Holding
- Zoning ordinance did not violate 14th amendment based on application of Disparate Impact/Purposeful Discrimination test.

Court membership
- Chief Justice Warren E. Burger Associate Justices William J. Brennan Jr. · Potter Stewart; Byron White · Thurgood Marshall; Harry Blackmun · Lewis F. Powell Jr. William Rehnquist · John P. Stevens

Case opinions
- Majority: Powell, joined by Burger, Stewart, Blackmun, Rehnquist
- Concur/dissent: Marshall, joined by Brennan
- Dissent: White
- Stevens took no part in the consideration or decision of the case.

Laws applied
- U.S. Const. Amend. XIV

Village of Arlington Heights v. Metropolitan Housing Development Corp., 429 U.S. 252 (1977), was a case heard by the Supreme Court of the United States dealing with a zoning ordinance that in a practical way barred families of various socio-economic, and ethno-racial backgrounds from residing in a neighborhood. The Court held that the ordinance was constitutional because there was no proof that "discriminatory purpose was a motivating factor in the Village's decision."

== History ==
A zoning ordinance in the Village of Arlington Heights, a Chicago suburb, barred the construction of multi-family housing facilities (such as apartment complexes) in the center of the neighborhood. The neighborhood was zoned for single-family dwellings without variance since 1959.

== Ruling ==
Rather than applying a strict scrutiny test for a law that on its face is based on a suspect classification, the court applied a discriminatory intent test to determine whether the ordinance was actually based on a discriminatory intent which, in turn, would determine the constitutionality of the ordinance since the ordinance mentioned nothing about racial classifications. "When there is a proof that a discriminatory purpose has been a motivating factor in the decision, this judicial deference is no longer justified. Determining whether invidious discriminatory purpose was a motivating factor demands a sensitive inquiry into such circumstantial and direct evidence of intent as may be available." The Court stated that the challenging party has the burden of showing that 1) the official action affects a protected class in greater proportion than others, and if such is established, 2) that the official action was intended to discriminate against a suspect or protected class.

Determining the intent of the official action can be difficult (outside of rare cases where racial discrimination is obvious on the face), and the court suggested that a fact intensive balancing test considering many factors including but not limited to: 1) the impact of the challenged decision (whether it disproportionately impacted one race); 2) the historical background of decisions under the official action, particularly if unequally applied in situations involving race; 3) the specific sequences of events leading up to the decision challenged in the case, including departures from normal procedures in making decisions and substantive departures, (i.e., if the decision maker would have made a different choice had the applicant been white, then race was the deciding factor); and 4) the legislative history where there are contemporary statements made by the governmental body who created the official action.

=== Causation ===
Footnote 21 introduces an idea of causation to these cases. Namely, it states that the petitioner must prove respondent had 1) an improper intent (i.e. that his intent was to discriminate against another race). After this is proven, the burden of proof shifts to the respondent, who must prove that 2) the improper intent did not actually affect the outcome of his decision. Thus, the court is saying that to satisfy this test, you must prove improper intent, a disparate impact, and causation in-fact (i.e. that the improper intent is the cause of the disparate impact). If causation in-fact cannot be proven, "there would be no justification for judicial interference with the challenged decision," as "the complaining party in a case of this kind no longer fairly could attribute the injury complained of to improper consideration of a discriminatory purpose."

== Holding ==
In applying the aforementioned test, the court upheld the ordinance. Although it may have kept minorities and other economically challenged individuals from moving into the neighborhood, all multi-family housing existed on the neighborhood borders to commercial areas, whereas here the developer wanted to place the multifamily housing units in the center of the neighborhood. Additionally, the ordinance had been in place since 1959, and had been applied the same way, allowing only multifamily housing on the border without regard to price of rent, purchase, or governmental subsidy. Furthermore, there had never been any incidents of discriminatory procedural practices because the city council had allowed a variance to the developer in the past for the same type of low income, multi-family housing. Moreover, there had been no instances of substantive departures either because since 1959, each housing proposal for multi-family complexes had been required to be built bordering commercial areas. This case was part of a trio of case in the 1970s solidifying the court's use of the intent doctrine as the standard for analyzing challenges to facially neutral state actions.

== See also ==
- List of United States Supreme Court cases, volume 429
- Village of Euclid, Ohio v. Ambler Realty Co. (1926)
