= List of United States Supreme Court cases, volume 576 =

This is a list of all the United States Supreme Court cases from volume 576 of the United States Reports:

Case name	Citation	Date decided
Zivotofsky v. Kerry	576 U.S. 1	June 8, 2015
"Because the President has the exclusive power to grant formal recognition to a foreign sovereign, §214(d) of the Foreign Relations Authorization Act, Fiscal Year 2003—which requires the Secretary of State, upon request, to record the birthplace of a Jerusalem-born United States citizen as Israel on, inter alia, a passport—infringes on the Executive's consistent decision to withhold recognition with respect to Jerusalem."
Kerry v. Din	576 U.S. 86	June 15, 2015
"The Ninth Circuit's judgment—that Din's liberty interest in her marriage entitled her to judicial review of her husband's visa denial, and that the Government deprived her of that interest without due process by denying the visa application without giving a more detailed explanation of its reasons—is vacated, and the case is remanded."
Baker Botts L.L.P. v. ASARCO LLC	576 U.S. 121	June 15, 2015
"Section §330(a)(1) of the Bankruptcy Code, which permits bankruptcy courts to 'award . . . reasonable compensation for actual, necessary services rendered by' §327(a) professionals, does not permit bankruptcy courts to award attorney's fees for work performed defending fee applications."
Reyes Mata v. Lynch	576 U.S. 143	June 15, 2015
"The Fifth Circuit erred in declining to take jurisdiction to review the Board of Immigration Appeals' decision denying Mata's request for equitable tolling of the time limit for filing a motion to reopen Mata's deportation case."
Reed v. Town of Gilbert	576 U.S. 155	June 18, 2015
"The Town of Gilbert's Sign Code contains content-based regulations of speech that do not survive strict scrutiny."
McFadden v. United States	576 U.S. 186	June 18, 2015
"In prosecuting a violation of the Controlled Substance Analogue Enforcement Act of 1986, the Government must establish that the defendant knew he was dealing with a substance regulated under the Controlled Substances Act or Analogue Act."
Walker v. Sons of Confederate Veterans	576 U.S. 200	June 18, 2015
"Texas's specialty license plate designs constitute government speech, and thus Texas was entitled to refuse to issue respondents' proposed plates featuring a Confederate battle flag."
Ohio v. Clark	576 U.S. 237	June 18, 2015
"The Sixth Amendment's Confrontation Clause did not prohibit prosecutors from introducing statements made by a child abuse victim to his teachers, where neither the child, who was unavailable for cross-examination, nor his teachers had the primary purpose of creating an out-of-court substitute for trial testimony."
Davis v. Ayala	576 U.S. 257	June 18, 2015
"Ayala is not entitled to federal habeas relief because any federal constitutional error that may have occurred from the trial judge's exclusion of defense counsel from part of a Batson hearing was harmless under Brecht v. Abrahamson, 507 U. S. 619, and the Antiterrorism and Effective Death Penalty Act of 1996."
Brumfield v. Cain	576 U.S. 305	June 18, 2015
"The state trial court's decision to deny Brumfield a hearing on whether an intellectual disability rendered him death-penalty ineligible under Atkins v. Virginia, 536 U. S. 304, was an 'unreasonable determination of the facts in light of the evidence presented,' 28 U. S. C. §2254(d)(2), entitling Brumfield to have his federal habeas claim heard on the merits."
Horne v. Dept. of Agric.	576 U.S. 351	June 22, 2015
"The Raisin Administrative Committee's requirement that growers set aside a certain percentage of their crop for the account of the Government, free of charge, is a physical taking under the Fifth Amendment, entitling the Hornes to just compensation."
Kingsley v. Hendrickson	576 U.S. 389	June 22, 2015
"To prevail on an excessive force claim under 42 U. S. C. §1983, a pretrial detainee must show only that the force purposely or knowingly used against him was objectively unreasonable; the officers' state of mind jury instruction given in Kingsley's case was erroneous because it suggested a subjective inquiry."
City of Los Angeles v. Patel	576 U.S. 409	June 22, 2015
"A provision in the city of Los Angeles' municipal code that permits police officers to conduct administrative searches of hotel guest records is facially unconstitutional because hotel operators who fail to turn over their records are subject to punishment without first being afforded the opportunity for precompliance review."
Kimble v. Marvel Entertainment, LLC	576 U.S. 446	June 22, 2015
"In Brulotte v. Thys Co., 379 U.S. 29 (1964), this Court held that a patent holder cannot charge royalties for the use of his invention after its patent term has expired. The sole question presented here is whether we should overrule Brulotte. Adhering to principles of stare decisis, we decline to do so."
King v. Burwell	576 U.S. 473	June 25, 2015
"The Patient Protection and Affordable Care Act's tax credits are available to individuals in States that have a Federal Exchange."
Tex. Dept. of Housing and Community Affairs v. Inclusive Communities Project, Inc.	576 U.S. 519	June 25, 2015
"Disparate-impact claims are cognizable under the Fair Housing Act."
Johnson v. United States	576 U.S. 591	June 26, 2015
"Imposing an increased sentence under the Armed Career Criminal Act of 1984's residual clause—which defines a 'violent felony' to include 'conduct that presents a serious potential risk of physical injury to another,' 18 U. S. C. §924(e)(2)(B)—violates due process."
Obergefell v. Hodges	576 U.S. 644	June 26, 2015
"The Fourteenth Amendment requires a State to license a marriage between two people of the same sex and to recognize a marriage between two people of the same sex when their marriage was lawfully licensed and performed out-of-State."
Michigan v. EPA	576 U.S. 743	June 29, 2015
"EPA interpreted 42 U. S. C. §7412(n)(1)(A) unreasonably when it deemed cost irrelevant to the decision to regulate emissions of hazardous air pollutants from power plants."
Ariz. State Legislature v. Ariz. Independent Redistricting Comm'n	576 U.S. 787	June 29, 2015
"The Elections Clause and 2 U. S. C. §2a(c) permit Arizona's use of a commission to adopt congressional districts."
Glossip v. Gross	576 U.S. 863	June 29, 2015
"Petitioners, death-row inmates, have failed to establish a likelihood of success on the merits of their claim that Oklahoma's use of midazolam in its lethal injection protocol violates the Eighth Amendment."
