= Disparate treatment =

Form of unlawful discrimination in US labor law

Disparate treatment is one kind of unlawful discrimination in US labor law. In the United States, it means unequal behavior toward someone because of a protected characteristic (e.g. race or sex) under Title VII of the United States Civil Rights Act. This contrasts with disparate impact, where an employer applies a neutral rule that treats everyone equally in form, but has a disadvantageous effect on some people of a protected characteristic compared to others.

Title VII prohibits employers from treating applicants or employees differently because of their membership in a protected class. A disparate treatment violation is made out when an individual of a protected group is shown to have been singled out and treated less favorably than others similarly situated on the basis of an impermissible criterion under Title VII. The issue is whether the employer's actions were motivated by discriminatory intent. Discriminatory intent can either be shown by direct evidence, or through indirect or circumstantial evidence.

== Title VII, Griggs, and the Civil Rights Act of 1991 ==
Under Title VII, a disparate-treatment plaintiff must establish "that the defendant had a discriminatory intent or motive" for taking a job-related action. This doctrine was read into the act in Griggs v. Duke Power Co., which interpreted the Act to prohibit, in some cases, employers' facially neutral practices that, in fact, are "discriminatory in operation." The Griggs Court stated that the "touchstone" for disparate-impact liability is the lack of "business necessity": "If an employment practice which operates to exclude [minorities] cannot be shown to be related to job performance, the practice is prohibited." If an employer met its burden by showing that its practice was job-related, the plaintiff was required to show a legitimate alternative that would have resulted in less discrimination.

Twenty years after Griggs, the Civil Rights Act of 1991 was enacted. The Act included a provision codifying the prohibition on disparate-impact discrimination. Under the disparate-impact statute, a plaintiff establishes a prima facie violation by showing that an employer uses "a particular employment practice that causes a disparate impact on the basis of race, color, religion, sex, or national origin." An employer may defend against liability by demonstrating that the practice is "job related for the position in question and consistent with business necessity." Even if the employer meets that burden, however, a plaintiff may still succeed by showing that the employer refuses to adopt an available alternative employment practice that has less disparate impact and serves the employer's legitimate needs.

== Direct method ==
Under the direct method, a plaintiff tries to show that his membership in the protected class was a motivating factor in the adverse job action.

1. He may offer direct evidence, e.g. that the defendant admitted that it was motivated by discriminatory intent or that it acted pursuant to a policy that is discriminatory on its face. Direct evidence of discrimination is rarely available, given that most employers do not openly admit that they discriminate. Facially discriminatory policies are only permissible if gender, national origin, or religion is a bona fide occupational qualification for the position in question. Race or color may never be a bona fide occupational qualification.
2. He may offer any of three types of circumstantial evidence:

- "suspicious timing, ambiguous statements oral or written, behavior toward or comments directed at other employees in the protected group, and other bits and pieces from which an inference of discriminatory intent might be drawn."
- evidence that other, similarly-situated employees not in the protected class received systematically better treatment.
- evidence that the plaintiff was qualified for the job, a person not in the protected class got the job, and the employer's stated reason for its decision is unworthy of belief. Id. This type of circumstantial evidence is substantially the same as the evidence required by the McDonnell Douglas method described below.

== Indirect method – burden-shifting ==
In the majority of cases, the plaintiff lacks direct evidence of discrimination and must prove discriminatory intent indirectly by inference. The Supreme Court analyzes these cases using the McDonnell Douglas burden-shifting formula. The analysis is as follows:

(1) The plaintiff must establish a prima facie case of discrimination.
(2) The employer must then articulate, through admissible evidence, a legitimate, nondiscriminatory reason for its actions.
(3) To prevail, the plaintiff must prove that the employer's stated reason is a pretext to hide discrimination.
In the Seventh Circuit, courts generally analyze disparate treatment cases using this method, though attorneys may also use the direct method described above.

- Prima facie case: The elements of the prima facie case are:

(i) The plaintiff is a member of a protected class.
(ii) The plaintiff applied and was qualified for the job.
(iii) The application was rejected.
(iv) The position remained open after the rejection.
St. Mary's Honor Center v. Hicks, 509 U.S. 502, 505-507. In a termination case, the second element is whether the plaintiff was performing up to the employer's legitimate expectations.
"The burden of establishing a prima facie case of disparate treatment is not onerous." Burdine, 450 U.S. at 253. Establishment of a prima facie case creates an inference that the employer acted with discriminatory intent. Id. at 254. Although establishing a prima facie case used to be fairly routine, the courts have begun scrutinizing the second element of the test more rigorously. See, e.g. Cengr v. Fusibond Piping Systems, Inc., 135 F.3d 445 (7th Cir. 1998); Fisher v. Wayne Dalton Corp., 139 F.3d 1137 (7th Cir. 1998). It is the role of the judge, not the jury, to determine whether the plaintiff has stated a prima facie case.

- Employer's burden of production: To rebut the inference of discrimination, the employer must articulate, through admissible evidence, a legitimate, non-discriminatory reason for its actions. The employer's burden is one of production, not persuasion; the ultimate burden of persuasion always remains with the plaintiff.
- Plaintiff's proof of pretext: Proof that the defendant's asserted reason is untrue permits, but does not require, a finding of discrimination. The Seventh Circuit has held in one case that where the defendant asserts several reasons for its decision, the plaintiff may not normally survive summary judgment by refuting only one of the reasons. In another case, the court held that plaintiff need not rebut all of defendant's reasons but must instead show that defendant's decision was based on a prohibited factor. Monroe v. Children's Home Association, 128 F.3d 591, 593 (7th Cir. 1997).

In addition to producing evidence of the falsity of the employer's proffered reason, the plaintiff may also attempt to prove pretext using: comparative evidence; statistics; or direct evidence of discrimination.

Comparative evidence: Plaintiff may prove pretext by offering evidence that similarly situated employees who are not in the plaintiff's protected group were treated more favorably or did not receive the same adverse treatment. The Seventh Circuit has issued differing opinions on whether the plaintiff's testimony about the comparative employees is sufficient to raise a factual issue and survive summary judgment. For example, in Collier v. Budd Co., 66 F.3d 886 (7th Cir. 1995), the employer offered evidence that the younger employees who were retained were better qualified than the plaintiff. In his deposition, the plaintiff disputed that these employees were better qualified. The court said that the resulting credibility decision was best left for the trier of fact, and reversed a summary judgment ruling for the employer. Collier at 893. On the other hand, in Russell v. Acme-Evans Co., 51 F.3d 64 (7th Cir. 1995), the court held that the plaintiff's testimony regarding the qualifications of the workers who were given the positions that plaintiff wanted was insufficient to create a factual issue and survive summary judgment given that the employer had stated that they were more qualified.
Statistics: Statistics are admissible in individual disparate treatment cases, but their usefulness depends on their relevance to the specific decision affecting the individual plaintiff.
Direct evidence: Although direct evidence of discrimination can be very powerful, courts often give little weight to discriminatory remarks made by persons other than decision makers, "stray" remarks not pertaining directly to the plaintiffs, or remarks that are distant in time to the disputed employment decision. See, e.g., McCarthy v. Kemper Life Ins. Cos., 924 F.2d 683, 687 (7th Cir. 1991) (discriminatory remarks by a fellow employee are not evidence of discriminatory discharge because they were not made by a decision maker and the remarks occurred two years before the discharge); Cowan v. Glenbrook Security Services, Inc., 123 F.3d 438, 444 (7th Cir. 1997) ("[S]tray remarks . . . cannot justify requiring the employer to prove that its hiring or firing or promotion decisions were based on legitimate criteria. Such remarks . . . when unrelated to the decisional issue process, are insufficient to demonstrate that the employer relied on illegitimate criteria, even when such statements are made by the decision maker").

Instructing the jury: If the case goes to a jury, the elaborate McDonnell Douglas formula should not be part of the jury instructions. The ultimate question for the jury is whether the defendant took the actions at issue because of the plaintiff's membership in a protected class.

== Mixed motives ==
The plaintiff in a disparate treatment case need only prove that membership in a protected class was a motivating factor in the employment decision, not that it was the sole factor. One's membership in a protected class will be considered a motivating factor when it contributes to the employment decision. If the employer proves that it had another reason for its actions and it would have made the same decision without the discriminatory factor, it may avoid liability for monetary damages, reinstatement or promotion. The court may still grant the plaintiff declaratory relief, injunctive relief, and attorneys' fees and costs.

The Seventh Circuit has held that in a mixed motives retaliation case, the plaintiff is not entitled to declaratory relief, injunctive relief, or attorneys fees because retaliation is not listed in the mixed motives provision of the 1991 Civil Rights Act.

== After-acquired evidence ==
If an employer takes an adverse employment action against an employee for a discriminatory reason and later discovers a legitimate reason that it can prove would have led it to take the same action, the employer is still liable for the discrimination, but the relief that the employee can recover may be limited. McKennon v. Nashville Banner Publishing Co., 513 U.S. 352 (1995). In general, the employee is not entitled to reinstatement or front pay, and the back pay liability period is limited to the time between the occurrence of the discriminatory act and the date the misconduct justifying the job action is discovered. McKennon, 513 U.S. at 361-62.

== Pattern or practice discrimination ==
In class actions or other cases alleging a widespread practice of intentional discrimination, plaintiffs may establish a prima facie case using statistical evidence instead of comparative evidence pertaining to each class member. Plaintiffs often combine the statistical evidence with anecdotal or other evidence of discriminatory treatment. The employer can rebut the prima facie case by introducing alternative statistics or by demonstrating that plaintiff's proof is either inaccurate or insignificant. The plaintiff then bears the burden of proving that the employer's information is biased, inaccurate, or otherwise unworthy of credence.

== Contrast to disparate impact ==
A violation of Title VII can be shown in two separate and distinct ways. The alternative to a "disparate treatment" theory is a "disparate impact" theory. A disparate impact violation is when an employer is shown to have used a specific employment practice, neutral on its face but that caused a substantial adverse impact to a protected group, and cannot be justified as serving a legitimate business goal for the employer. No proof of intentional discrimination is necessary.

== Fair Housing Act ==
The disparate treatment theory has application also in the housing context under Title VIII of the Civil Rights Act of 1968, also known as the Fair Housing Act. The Fair Housing Act prohibits disparate treatment in the housing market due to race, color, religion, national origin, sex, family status, and disability. The U.S. Department of Housing and Urban Development's Office of Fair Housing and Equal Opportunity enforces this law. It receives and investigates any discrimination complaints that are filed.

== See also ==
- US labor law
