= List of United States Supreme Court cases, volume 433 =

This is a list of all the United States Supreme Court cases from volume 433 of the United States Reports:

Case name	Citation	Date decided
United States v. Chadwick	433 U.S. 1	1977
Miree v. DeKalb Cnty.	433 U.S. 25	1977
Continental T.V., Inc. v. GTE Sylvania Inc.	433 U.S. 36	1977
Wainwright v. Sykes	433 U.S. 72	1977
Jones v. N.C. Prisoners' Labor Union	433 U.S. 119	1977
Comm'r v. Standard Life & Accident Ins. Co.	433 U.S. 148	1977
Puyallup Tribe, Inc. v. Dept. of Game	433 U.S. 165	1977
Shaffer v. Heitner	433 U.S. 186	1977
Wolman v. Walter	433 U.S. 229	1977
Milliken v. Bradley II	433 U.S. 267	1977
Hazelwood School District v. United States	433 U.S. 299	1977
Dothard v. Rawlinson	433 U.S. 321	1977
Bates v. State Bar of Arizona	433 U.S. 350	1977
Dayton Bd. of Educ. v. Brinkman	433 U.S. 406	1977
Nixon v. Administrator of General Services	433 U.S. 425	1977
Coker v. Georgia	433 U.S. 584	1977
Vendo Co. v. Lektro-Vend Corp.	433 U.S. 623	1977
Sch. Dist. v. United States	433 U.S. 667	1977
Brennan v. Armstrong	433 U.S. 672	1977
Finch v. United States	433 U.S. 676	1977
Harris v. Oklahoma	433 U.S. 682	1977
