= Forbi Nchinda =

Cameroonian politician

Forbi Simon Nchinda (born 1947) is a Cameroonian politician and member of the parliament representing Bamenda and Bali Constituency. In 2018, he ran for the presidential nomination of Social Democratic Front (SDf) and polled 134 votes but lost to Joshua Osih who won 1021 of the delegate votes in the party's primary held on 24 February 2018.

Nchinda was an assistant professor at the National School of Engineering of Yaounde before going into full-time politics. In 2018, Nchinda joined Southern Cameroons National Council, SCNC, to mount pressure on President Biya to initiate dialogue with the Anglophone Cameroonians pushing for an independent State of Ambazonia.
