= List of United States Supreme Court cases, volume 429 =

This is a list of all the United States Supreme Court cases from volume 429 of the United States Reports:

| Case name | Citation | Date decided |
|---|---|---|
| United States v. Morrison (1976 case) | 429 U.S. 1 | 1976 |
| United States v. Rose | 429 U.S. 5 | 1976 |
| United States v. Dieter | 429 U.S. 6 | 1976 |
| United States v. Pomponio | 429 U.S. 10 | 1976 |
| United States v. Sanford | 429 U.S. 14 | 1976 |
| Standard Oil Co. v. United States (1976) | 429 U.S. 17 | 1976 |
| Moore v. United States (1976) | 429 U.S. 20 | 1976 |
| INS v. Bagamasbad | 429 U.S. 24 | 1976 |
| Hutto v. Ross | 429 U.S. 28 | 1976 |
| United States v. Foster Lumber Co. | 429 U.S. 32 | 1976 |
| Scott v. Ky. Parole Bd. | 429 U.S. 60 | 1976 |
| Parker Seal Co. v. Cummins | 429 U.S. 65 | 1976 |
| Massachusetts v. Feeney | 429 U.S. 66 | 1976 |
| Tully v. Griffin, Inc. | 429 U.S. 68 | 1976 |
| Moody v. Daggett | 429 U.S. 78 | 1976 |
| Estelle v. Gamble | 429 U.S. 97 | 1976 |
| Belcher v. Stengel | 429 U.S. 118 | 1976 |
| United States v. Kopp | 429 U.S. 121 | 1976 |
| Davis v. Georgia | 429 U.S. 122 | 1976 |
| Gen. Elec. Co. v. Gilbert | 429 U.S. 125 | 1976 |
| Idaho ex rel. Andrus v. Oregon | 429 U.S. 163 | 1976 |
| Cook v. Hudson | 429 U.S. 165 | 1976 |
| Madison Joint Sch. Dist. v. Wis. Emp. Rels. Comm'n | 429 U.S. 167 | 1976 |
| Mathews v. de Castro | 429 U.S. 181 | 1976 |
| Craig v. Boren | 429 U.S. 190 | 1976 |
| Elec. Workers v. Robbins & Myers, Inc. | 429 U.S. 229 | 1976 |
| Connally v. Georgia | 429 U.S. 245 | 1977 |
| Village of Arlington Heights v. Metropolitan Housing Development Corp. | 429 U.S. 252 | 1977 |
| Mt. Healthy v. Doyle | 429 U.S. 274 | 1977 |
| Knebel v. Hein | 429 U.S. 288 | 1977 |
| Bayside Enters., Inc. v. NLRB | 429 U.S. 298 | 1977 |
| Steelworkers v. Usery | 429 U.S. 305 | 1977 |
| Bost. Stock Exch. v. State Tax Comm'n | 429 U.S. 318 | 1977 |
| G.M. Leasing Corp. v. United States | 429 U.S. 338 | 1977 |
| Oregon ex rel. State Land Bd. v. Corvallis Sand & Gravel Co. | 429 U.S. 363 | 1977 |
| Pearson v. Dodd | 429 U.S. 396 | 1977 |
| Guste v. Jackson | 429 U.S. 399 | 1977 |
| Walsh v. Schlecht | 429 U.S. 401 | 1977 |
| United States v. Donovan | 429 U.S. 413 | 1977 |
| United States v. Fresno Cnty. | 429 U.S. 452 | 1977 |
| Brunswick Corp. v. Pueblo Bowl-O-Mat, Inc. | 429 U.S. 477 | 1977 |
| Oregon v. Mathiason | 429 U.S. 492 | 1977 |
| Stanton v. Stanton | 429 U.S. 501 | 1977 |
| NLRB v. Pipefitters | 429 U.S. 507 | 1977 |
| Weatherford v. Bursey | 429 U.S. 545 | 1977 |
| Don E. Williams Co. v.IRS | 429 U.S. 569 | 1977 |
| Whalen v. Roe | 429 U.S. 589 | 1977 |
| U.S. Steel Corp. v. Fortner Enterprises, Inc. | 429 U.S. 610 | 1977 |
| Codd v. Velger | 429 U.S. 624 | 1977 |
| United States v. Warren Cnty. | 429 U.S. 642 | 1977 |
| Donovan v. Penn Shipping Co. | 429 U.S. 648 | 1977 |
| Concerned Citizens v. Pine Creek Conservancy Dist. | 429 U.S. 651 | 1977 |
| Gregg v. Georgia | 429 U.S. 1301 | 1976 |
| Bateman v. Arizona | 429 U.S. 1302 | 1976 |
| New York v. Kleppe | 429 U.S. 1307 | 1976 |
| Gruner v. Super. Ct. | 429 U.S. 1314 | 1976 |
| McCarthy v. Briscoe I | 429 U.S. 1316 | 1976 |
| McCarthy v. Briscoe II | 429 U.S. 1317 | 1976 |
| Fishman v. Schaffer | 429 U.S. 1325 | 1976 |
| Volvo of Am. Corp. v. Schwarzer | 429 U.S. 1331 | 1976 |
| Evans v. Atl. Richfield Co. | 429 U.S. 1334 | 1976 |
| Meeropol v. Nizer | 429 U.S. 1337 | 1977 |
| Houchins v. KQED, Inc. | 429 U.S. 1341 | 1977 |
| Marshall v. Barlow's, Inc. | 429 U.S. 1347 | 1977 |
