= Nebraska Coalition for Gay and Lesbian Civil Rights =

US LGBT rights advocacy group

The Nebraska Coalition for Gay and Lesbian Civil Rights, later called the Nebraska Coalition for LGBT Civil Rights, was an advocacy group in Nebraska that operated from 1981 to approximately 2002. Based in Lincoln, the group advocated for LGBT civil rights. Its motto was "equality before the law", the same motto as the state of Nebraska.

Its modern-day successor is OutNebraska.

== History ==
=== Founding ===
The Nebraska Coalition for Gay and Lesbian Civil Rights was founded in 1981 to support a proposed amendment to a Lincoln city ordinance. The amendment would have outlawed discrimination in employment, housing, and public accommodations on the basis of sexual orientation and affectional orientation. Coalition spokesman Scott Stebelman said that about fifty people were working together in the new Coalition.

Fierce opposition to the proposed amendment was led by University of Nebraska–Lincoln psychologist Paul Cameron. Coalition members refused to debate Cameron, saying "the coalition's feeling was we would debate any reasonable psychologist, but did not believe Paul Cameron fell into that class."

At election time, the amendment was defeated by a 4-to-1 margin. The Coalition refocused on community advocacy instead of elections.

The organization that Cameron founded to oppose the amendment would become the Family Research Institute, a nationally influential producer of pseudoscience against homosexuality. The Nebraska Coalition for Gay and Lesbian Civil Rights argued against Cameron's publications conflating homosexuality with child abuse. Their arguments contributed to Cameron's eventual expulsion from the American Psychological Association.

In 1983 the Coalition sponsored an event, the Great Plains Conference of Gay Men and Lesbians. Attendees from the plains states discussed recent failures to pass civil rights measures in the region.

=== The AIDS epidemic ===
The Coalition distributed brochures on safe sex practices in the mid 1980s. The brochures sought to dispel the then-common myth that AIDS is spread by casual contact.

The Coalition partnered with the Nebraska AIDS Project in 1986 to mail a survey to medical providers throughout Nebraska asking if providers would accept gay and lesbian patients or patients at risk for HIV. The responses were used to create a referral list of safe providers.

=== The 1990s ===
In 1993 the Nebraska legislature considered a bill, LB 395, to ban employment discrimination against gays and lesbians. California-based Christian fundamentalist leader Lou Sheldon was brought to Lincoln by the Nebraska chapter of the Traditional Values Coalition to speak against LB 395. Sheldon claimed the bill was part of a nationwide anti-family "homosexual agenda". The Nebraska Coalition for Gay and Lesbian Civil Rights coordinated a protest to counter Sheldon's statements. About fifty demonstrators appeared in front a local restaurant, the Green Gateau, chosen because of the belief that it had recently fired an employee for being gay.

In the 1990s the Coalition sponsored poetry readings and dances that served as an alternative to socializing in gay bars.

=== The 2000s marriage fight ===
In November 2000, seventy percent of Nebraska voters approved Initiative 416, an amendment to the state constitution prohibiting same-sex marriage, civil union, domestic partnership, or other similar same-sex relationship. The Coalition opposed this new law and protested at the victory party held by the Nebraska Family Council, the organization that had spearheaded the amendment.

In April 2002, the Coalition staged a protest to raise awareness about ongoing discrimination against LGBT people in Nebraska by forming a human chain of supporters around the Nebraska State Capitol. They called on Nebraskans to uphold the state motto, "equality before the law," highlighting issues such as employment discrimination based on sexual orientation and the passage of Initiative 416. It was the first time since World War II that a human chain was formed around the building. Omaha Senator Ernie Chambers, an advocate for LGBT equal rights, spoke at the event, urging the community to continue their fight for equality.

The organization also had social events in 2002 but faded from existence shortly afterward. Same-sex marriage remained unlawful in Nebraska until the 2015 Waters v. Ricketts and Obergefell v. Hodges court rulings.
