= LGBTQ rights in Nebraska =

- Nebraska (US)
- Legal status: Legal since 1978
- Gender identity: Transgender people allowed to change legal gender following surgery
- Discrimination protections: Protections for sexual orientation and gender identity in employment and housing

Family rights
- Recognition of relationships: Same-sex marriage since 2015
- Adoption: Same-sex couples allowed to adopt

Lesbian, gay, bisexual, transgender, and queer (LGBTQ) people in the U.S. state of Nebraska may face some legal challenges not experienced by non-LGBTQ residents. Same-sex sexual activity is legal in Nebraska, and same-sex marriage has been recognized since June 2015 as a result of Obergefell v. Hodges. The state prohibits discrimination on account of sexual orientation and gender identity in employment and housing following the U.S. Supreme Court's ruling in Bostock v. Clayton County and a subsequent decision of the Nebraska Equal Opportunity Commission. In addition, the state's largest city, Omaha, has enacted protections in public accommodations.

In 2018, Megan Hunt became the first openly LGBT person elected to the Nebraska Legislature. 2019 polling from the Public Religion Research Institute showed that 73% of Nebraska residents supported anti-discrimination legislation protecting LGBTQ people. In a 2014 survey, about half of LGBTQ people in Nebraska had seriously considered suicide at some point in their lives.

== Legality of same-sex sexual activity ==
Prior to European settlement of Nebraska, there were no known social or legal punishments for engaging in homosexual activity. Among several Native American tribes, customs of "two-spirit" individuals exist, where male-bodied or female-bodied people dress, act and live as the opposite gender, as well as perform tasks associated with the opposite gender. Such individuals are known as mix'uga in the Omaha-Ponca language, spoken by the Ponca and Omaha peoples. The Native Americans do not share the typical Western views of gender and sexuality.

In 1858, a few years after the creation of the Nebraska Territory, a prohibition on sodomy ("crime against nature"), whether heterosexual or homosexual, was passed into law. Punishment varied between one year to life imprisonment. In the 1910 case of Kinnan v. State, the Nebraska Supreme Court unanimously ruled that fellatio (oral sex) was not a violation of the sodomy statute. In response, the Nebraska Legislature revised certain parts of the law in 1913, outlawing fellatio and reducing the maximum penalty for sodomy to 20 years in jail.

In 1929, Nebraska amended its sterilization law to make it applicable to state inmates who were "feeble-minded, insane, habitual criminals, moral degenerates or sexual perverts". This law was upheld by the state Supreme Court in In Re Clayton in 1931. By 1934, 276 people had been sterilized. The law was repealed in 1969, having almost only being used on the "insane or mentally retarded".

All sodomy laws were repealed at the state level when a revised criminal code was enacted in June 1977, effective on July 1, 1978. The unicameral Nebraska Legislature accomplished the repeal by overriding the veto of the original legislation by Governor J. James Exon by the minimum margin, 32 to 15. No other state repealed its sodomy criminalization statute by such a veto override.

The extent to which the state's anti-sodomy statute was enforced is unclear; Nebraska has no published sodomy cases during the 1950s or 1960s. Like many other states, Nebraska enacted a "psychopathic offender" law in the years after World War II. The Nebraska Bar Association objected when that law was revised to cover a first offense. A study showed that 7% of commitments under the law were for consenting adult gay men.

== Recognition of same-sex relationships ==
=== Same-sex marriage ===
Same-sex marriage has been legal in the state of Nebraska since June 26, 2015, when the U.S. Supreme Court ruled in Obergefell v. Hodges that the denial of marriage rights to same-sex couples is unconstitutional. That same day, Attorney General Doug Peterson said in a statement that "Recognizing the rule of law, the State of Nebraska will comply with the ruling of the United States Supreme Court in Obergefell. Nebraska officials will not enforce any Nebraska laws that are contrary to the United States Supreme Court's decision in Obergefell."

==== History ====
Nebraska is one of a handful of states to have banned same-sex marriage in its state Constitution but not in the form of a legislative statute. Voters adopted, by a 70% to 30% margin, a constitutional amendment in November 2000 that defined marriage as the union of a man and a woman. Following the initiative, Nebraska extended hospital visitation rights to same-sex couples through a designated visitor statute.

There have been two significant lawsuits related to same-sex marriage in Nebraska. In 2005/06, in the matter of Citizens for Equal Protection v. Bruning, same-sex couple plaintiffs were successful in the United States District Court for the District of Nebraska having the state's constitutional ban on same-sex marriage struck down. However, an appeal by the state to the United States Court of Appeals for the Eighth Circuit reversed that ruling in 2006.

Following the U.S. Supreme Court's ruling in United States v. Windsor (2013), state bans on same-sex marriage came under enhanced judicial scrutiny. In the matter of Waters v. Ricketts (2015), the U.S. District Court for the District of Nebraska again struck down the state's constitutional ban on same-sex marriage. The decision of the district court was stayed until the Supreme Court's ruling in Obergefell v. Hodges on June 26, 2015, which struck down all state bans on same-sex marriage under the Equal Protection and Due Process clauses of the United States Constitution.

Kathy Pettersen and Beverly Reicks were the first same-sex couple to file marriage paperwork at the Douglas County Clerk's Office on June 26, 2015. Barbara DiBernard and Judith Gibson were the first to wed in Lancaster County, which contains the capital city of Lincoln.

== Adoption and parenting ==
Nebraska permits adoption by same-sex couples and single LGBT individuals. Lesbian couples can access in vitro fertilization. State law recognizes the non-genetic, non-gestational mother as a legal parent to a child born via donor insemination, but only if the parents are married.

On August 27, 2013, three same-sex couples filed a lawsuit in state court seeking the right to serve as foster and adoptive parents. They claimed that the state's refusal to allow two unmarried adults or two homosexuals to adopt has been consistently enforced only against same-sex couples. (Note: The policy was established in a 1995 memo authored by the head of the state Department of Health and Human Services that said: "It is my decision that effective immediately, it is the policy of the Department of Social Service that children will not be placed in the homes of persons who identify themselves as homosexuals. This policy also applies to the area of foster home licensure in that, effective immediately, no foster home license shall be issued to persons who identify themselves as homosexual".) Ruling in Stewart v. Heineman, Lancaster County District Judge John Colborn ruled for the plaintiffs on August 5, 2015. He wrote, "Defendants have not argued, nor have they identified, any legitimate government interest to justify treating gay and lesbian couples differently than heterosexual individuals and heterosexual couples" in reviewing applications for foster and adoptive parents. The state appealed the ruling. In April 2017, the Nebraska Supreme Court upheld that decision and struck down the state's ban on same-sex couples becoming foster parents. The court compared the law to "a sign reading 'Whites Only' on the hiring-office door."

The Nebraska Supreme Court in March 2021 reversed a lower court ruling banning a same-sex couple from adopting. The court held that state adoption law "clearly allow a same-sex married couple to adopt".

In October 2021, an unmarried female same-sex couple is suing the Nebraska Department of Health and Human Services because of discrimination and a "lack of parental recognition" on their own and each other's biological children's birth certificates. Under Nebraska legislation, unmarried heterosexual couples can get "full parental recognition of their children" just by filling out Voluntary Acknowledgement of Parentage forms, but not unmarried same-sex couples in the same exact situation. Despite the court ordering that the non-birth parent be added to each child's birth certificate, Nebraska DHHS denied all requests by these two women to make these amendments.

== Discrimination protections ==
Map of Nebraska cities that had sexual orientation and/or gender identity anti–employment discrimination ordinances prior to Bostock Sexual orientation and gender identity with anti–employment discrimination ordinance Sexual orientation and gender identity in public employment Sexual orientation in public employment Does not protect sexual orientation and gender identity in employment¹ ¹Since 2020 as a result of Bostock, discrimination on account of sexual orientation or gender identity in public and private employment is outlawed throughout the state.

Following the 2020 court case of Bostock v. Clayton County, employment discrimination against LGBTQ people by reason of their sexual orientation or gender identity became illegal in the US, including in Nebraska. Prior to this case, Nebraska had no statewide protections for this type of discrimination. The ruling does not apply to discrimination in the areas of health care, credit, housing and public accommodations.

Bills to ban discrimination based on sexual orientation and gender identity were introduced in the Nebraska Legislature a number of times, but all were rejected or stalled.

As of 2020, only Omaha has a city-level ordinance, in effect since 2012, that prohibits discrimination on the basis of sexual orientation and gender identity in both public and private sectors with respect to employment and public accommodations. The cities of Grand Island and Lincoln prohibit discrimination on the basis of sexual orientation in public employment only. Bellevue has a similar policy that also includes gender identity. South Sioux City prohibits housing discrimination based on sexual orientation or gender identity.

Lincoln has no LGBT anti-discrimination ordinance for housing or private-sector employment. A proposed anti-discrimination ordinance was rejected by Lincoln voters in 1982. A campaign of opposition to the ordinance, led by UNL researcher Paul Cameron, resulted in the formation of the Family Research Institute, which has been designated by the SPLC an anti-gay hate group. In February 2022, Lincoln City Council by a 5–0 vote passed a local ordinance to explicitly include both sexual orientation and gender identity within all areas of employment, accommodation and housing. However these protections were removed in June 2022 because of a petition drive by the Nebraska Family Alliance, an anti-LGBT group.

=== Bostock v. Clayton County ===
On June 15, 2020, the U.S. Supreme Court ruled in Bostock v. Clayton County, consolidated with Altitude Express, Inc. v. Zarda, and R.G. & G.R. Harris Funeral Homes Inc. v. Equal Employment Opportunity Commission that discrimination in the workplace on the basis of sexual orientation or gender identity is discrimination on the basis of sex, and Title VII therefore protects LGBT employees from discrimination.

In early August 2020, the Nebraska Legislature passed a resolution, sponsored by Senator Patty Pansing Brooks, expressing support for the Bostock decision, by a 28 to 8 vote with several abstentions and absences.

In August 2020, the Nebraska Equal Opportunity Commission announced in light of Bostock that it will investigate and resolve cases alleging housing discrimination on account of sexual orientation or gender identity. Marna Munn, the executive director of the Commission at the time, said, "We will now be investigating housing claims on the basis of sexual orientation and gender identity. We will investigate on that basis, and we will create a disposition on that basis." Munn argued it would ultimately be up to the courts to affirm whether the Bostock decision also extends to housing cases, but that "it would be a stretch to think the U.S. Supreme Court would use different definitions of sex for workplace discrimination and housing discrimination". All the language is part of the same federal civil rights act, and Nebraska's statutes mirror the language of the federal law.

On February 11, 2021, the United States Department of Housing and Urban Development issued guidance directing all state and local agencies receiving funding under the Fair Housing Assistance Program to interpret the Fair Housing Act's prohibition on discrimination based on sex to include discrimination on the basis of sexual orientation and gender identity. In Nebraska, this guidance applies to the Nebraska Equal Opportunity Commission, the Lincoln Commission on Human Rights, and the Omaha Human Rights and Relations Department.

=== Nebraska State College System ===
In November 2021, the Nebraska State College System passed a vote by 4–2 to explicitly include “gender identity” within its policy changes.

== Transgender rights ==
=== Definition of sex ===
On August 30, 2023, Governor Jim Pillen signed an executive order to define sex. It refers to a person's "biological reproductive system" to define a female as someone whose system is "designed to produce ova” and a male as someone whose system is "designed to fertilize the ova of a female.” Pillen explained that the intention was to enable the state to "provid[e] single-sex spaces for women’s sports, bathrooms, and changing rooms."

=== Document changes ===
Transgender people legally resident in Nebraska are allowed to change the gender marker on their birth certificate. In order to do so, they must submit to the Vital Records Office "a notarized affidavit from the physician that performed sex reassignment surgery on [them] and a certified copy of an order of a court of competent jurisdiction changing [their] name". Changes to IDs and driver's licenses are also permitted; the applicant must submit to the Department of Motor Vehicles a court order certifying the change and/or a form signed by a licensed physician confirming sex reassignment surgery.

Nebraska permits transgender people to change their name. After completing paperwork with the district court, the applicant must schedule a court date and publish their name change for at least four consecutive weeks in a public record (for example a local newspaper). If the person is a minor, it only needs to run for two weeks

=== Sports ===
The Nebraska School Activities Association policies require transgender students wishing to participate in athletics to show evidence-based of both hormone replacement therapy and/or sex reassignment surgery.

In June 2025, the Governor of Nebraska Jim Pillen signed an "extensive and comprehensive female protection in sports bill" into law, Legislative Bill 89, that formally passed the unicameral Nebraska Legislature by a two-thirds majority that completed enactment - this would explicitly ban transgender athletes from any sports within Nebraska. The news magazine LGBTQ Nation identified 10 transgender athletes directly effected by the enacted legislation.

=== Gender-affirming healthcare ban on children ===
In May 2023, a bill passed the Nebraska Legislature by a vote of 33–15 after "numerous filibusters and delays" to legally ban gender-affirming healthcare on individuals under the age of 19 being minors (similar to Alabama). Originally a single bill on gender-affirming healthcare was introduced then failed, because of an ongoing filibuster and delay by Democrats - but then was immediately "attached and paper-cliped to another bill on abortion" later on when several Democrats didn't show up for work and the GOP "seeing the opportunity to pass along" legislation by force. The Governor of Nebraska Jim Pillen signed the bill into law, effective immediately. A lawsuit has been filed to try and "invalidate the law". The bill enacted potentially violates the "one subject per rule by the Legislature", because it was papercliped onto an abortion bill for political purposes straight after a filibuster - if found unconstitutional, the law would be automatically "null and void". In July 2024, the Nebraska Supreme Court by a vote of 6-1 upheld the recently implemented legislation.

== Hate crime law ==
In 1997, Nebraska passed a hate crime law, reading "A person in the State of Nebraska has the right to live free from violence, or intimidation by threat of violence, committed against his or her person or the destruction or vandalism of, or intimidation by threat of destruction or vandalism of, his or her property regardless of his or her race, color, religion, ancestry, national origin, gender, sexual orientation, age, or disability". The following crimes are among those subject to enhanced sentences: manslaughter, assault, terroristic threats, stalking, kidnapping and false imprisonment, rape and sexual assault, arson, criminal mischief, and trespassing.

A recent hate crime case occurred in October 2013. Ryan Langenegger and two gay friends were eating at a restaurant at the Old Market in Omaha, but left after overhearing three other male customers using homophobic slurs. The three men followed them to their car and continued the harassment. One of them, Gregory Duncan, punched Langenegger in the face before leaving. A jury convicted Duncan of third-degree assault and a hate crime charge, noting that while Langenegger was straight, state statutes specifies that those in the company of specific groups deserve protection as well. Duncan challenged the hate crime charge, with his attorney raising doubts that his punch met the definition of a hate crime and hoping that the case would "provide some direction for our courts" as to the definition of "sexual orientation" as the term is not explicitly defined in state law. The Attorney General commented that the "state might consider a more scholarly and legally sound definition of "sexual orientation"." The state Supreme Court upheld Duncan's hate crime charge in April 2016.

Although gender identity is not addressed, federal law has covered this category since 2009, when the Matthew Shepard and James Byrd Jr. Hate Crimes Prevention Act was signed into law by President Barack Obama.

== Conversion therapy ==
Attempting to change someone's sexual orientation or gender identity, also known as conversion therapy, has been outlawed in Lincoln since 2021. It is lawful in the rest of the state. Senator Megan Hunt reintroduced a bill in 2021 and 2025 to ban conversion therapy in Nebraska.

== Public opinion ==
A 2022 Public Religion Research Institute (PRRI) opinion poll found that 60% of Nebraska residents supported same-sex marriage, while 33% opposed it and 6% were unsure. Additionally, 67% supported an anti-discrimination law covering sexual orientation and gender identity. 29% were opposed.

Public opinion for LGBTQ anti-discrimination laws in Nebraska
Poll source	Date(s) administered	Sample size	Margin of error	% support	% opposition	% no opinion
Public Religion Research Institute	January 2-December 30, 2019	416	?	73%	20%	7%
Public Religion Research Institute	January 3-December 30, 2018	435	?	65%	25%	10%
Public Religion Research Institute	April 5-December 23, 2017	519	?	66%	21%	13%
Public Religion Research Institute	April 29, 2015-January 7, 2016	587	?	65%	29%	6%

== Summary table ==
Same-sex sexual activity legal	Yes (Since 1978)
Equal age of consent (16)	Yes (Since 1978)
Anti-discrimination laws in employment	Yes (Since 2020 federally)
Anti-discrimination laws in housing	Yes (Since 2020; per decision of the Nebraska Equal Opportunity Commission)
Anti-discrimination laws in public accommodations	No / Yes (City of Omaha only)
Anti-discrimination laws in schools and colleges	No
Same-sex marriages	Yes (Since 2015)
Stepchild and joint adoption by same-sex couples	Yes
Lesbian, gay and bisexual people allowed to serve openly in the military	Yes (Since 2011)
Transgender people allowed to serve openly in the military	Yes (Since 2021)
Intersex people allowed to serve openly in the military	(Current DoD policy bans "hermaphrodites" from serving or enlisting in the military)
Right to change legal gender	Yes (Requires sex reassignment surgery)
Conversion therapy banned on minors	No / Yes (Lincoln city only)
Gay panic defense banned	No
Access to IVF for lesbian couples	Yes
Surrogacy arrangements legal for gay male couples	Yes
MSMs allowed to donate blood	No / Yes (Since 2020; 3-month deferral period)

== See also ==
- LGBT rights in the United States
- Nebraska Initiative 416
- Brandon Teena
