= Same-sex marriage in Nebraska =

Same-sex marriage has been legal in Nebraska since June 26, 2015, when the U.S. Supreme Court ruled in the case of Obergefell v. Hodges that the denial of marriage rights to same-sex couples violates the Fourteenth Amendment to the U.S. Constitution. Following the court ruling, Attorney General Doug Peterson announced that the state of Nebraska would comply and recognize same-sex marriages. Previously, a lawsuit challenging the ban, Waters v. Ricketts, had been filed in the U.S. District Court for the District of Nebraska in November 2014. Judge Joseph Bataillon declared the ban unconstitutional on March 2, 2015, but the Eighth Circuit Court of Appeals issued a stay pending the outcome of Obergefell four days later. Judge Bataillon had also declared the ban unconstitutional in Citizens for Equal Protection v. Bruning on May 12, 2005, but that decision was overturned on appeal by the Eighth Circuit in July 2006.

Nebraska had previously denied marriage rights to same-sex couples in its State Constitution since 2000. Polling suggests that a majority of Nebraska residents support the legal recognition of same-sex marriage.

== Legal restrictions ==
In November 2000, Nebraska voters adopted Initiative Measure 416, a constitutional amendment defining marriage as the "union of a man and a woman" and prohibiting the recognition of same-sex relationships under any other name. The measure passed with 70.10% in favour and 29.90% opposed. The state has only restricted marriage rights for same-sex couples in its state constitution; it has never passed a measure to that effect in the form of a statute passed in the Nebraska Legislature. Nebraska's only recognition of same-sex relationships was its extension of hospital visitation rights to same-sex couples through a designated visitor statute.

In January 2016, the Nebraska Legislature began discussions on repealing the now-defunct same-sex marriage ban. Senator Burke Harr argued that the Constitution should be consistent with the law of the land regarding same-sex marriage. Two religious organizations opposed such a change, calling it "too costly" and arguing that it would "only create more divisiveness". Senator Patty Pansing Brooks later said, "Enough hurt. Enough harm. Enough damage has been done by the religious institutions." Senator Matt Hansen also introduced bills to make all references to marriage in state statutes gender-neutral, though the bills failed to pass. In January 2021, Pansing Brooks presented a ballot measure to repeal the state's defunct same-sex marriage ban. She argued that "putting the issue on the ballot would allow voters to show that public attitudes toward same-sex marriage have changed in Nebraska". The proposal was referred to the Judiciary Committee, which approved the measure by a 5–2 vote on February 11, but it was not voted on before the State Legislature adjourned sine die on May 27, 2021. Similar measures were proposed in 2023 by Senator Jen Day, and in 2025 by Senator Machaela Cavanaugh, but both also failed to pass before the end of the legislative session.

== Lawsuits ==
Same-sex marriage in the United States

=== Citizens for Equal Protection v. Bruning ===
In 2003, two LGBT advocacy organizations, Citizens for Equal Protection and the Nebraska Advocates for Justice and Equality, joined by the American Civil Liberties Union (ACLU) and also represented by Lambda Legal, filed suit in the U.S. District Court for the District of Nebraska challenging the constitutionality of Initiative Measure 416. District Court Judge Joseph Bataillon ruled in favour of the plaintiffs on May 12, 2005, overturning Initiative Measure 416 based on the Equal Protection Clause, the First Amendment, and the prohibition on bills of attainder contained in the Contract Clause. The state appealed the decision to the Eighth Circuit Court of Appeals and on July 14, 2006, in a unanimous opinion written by Chief Judge James B. Loken, the Eighth Court reversed the district court's decision on all three of its conclusions. The plaintiffs' subsequent request for an Eighth Circuit rehearing en banc was denied and they elected to not file a petition for certiorari in the U.S. Supreme Court.

=== Waters v. Ricketts ===
On November 17, 2014, the ACLU filed a lawsuit, originally Waters v. Heineman, in federal court on behalf of seven same-sex couples. The plaintiffs sought to overturn Nebraska's same-sex marriage ban and to have their out-of-state marriages recognized. The case became Waters v. Ricketts when Pete Ricketts succeeded Dave Heineman as governor in January 2015. On January 21, 2015, the state asked for proceedings to be stayed pending action by the U.S. Supreme Court in related same-sex marriage cases, and on January 23 Senior Judge Joseph Bataillon cancelled a hearing he had scheduled for January 29. On January 27, he denied the state's request to suspend proceedings. He held oral arguments on February 19. On March 2, he ruled for the plaintiffs, setting March 9 as the effective date of his order. He ruled:

Whether couched in terms of equal protection or due process jurisprudence, the State of Nebraska's purported rationales for its wholesale prohibition of same-sex marriage and refusal to recognize same-sex relationships valid in other states do not withstand constitutional scrutiny. The Amendment explicitly creates a classification based on gender because a person's eligibility to marry, or to have his or her marriage recognized, is based on the gender of the individuals seeking to marry. It facially discriminates based on gender and is subject to an intermediate level of scrutiny. [...] The State's contention that the question of whether to restrict marriage to opposite-sex couples should be left to the democratic process is unavailing. The Amendment is not somehow insulated from review because it was enacted by a significant majority. [...] Marriage is about more than procreation. The ostensible "procreative" purpose does not hold up in light of the situations presented by infertile, intentionally childless, or elderly couples, all of whom are allowed the benefits and responsibilities of a state-sanctioned marital relationship. Even if the State's purported justifications could be seen as important interests, a same-sex marriage ban is simply not substantially related to those interests.

Attorney General Doug Peterson immediately announced that the state would appeal the ruling and asked the Eighth Circuit Court of Appeals to stay Judge Bataillon's order prohibiting enforcement of the state's same-sex marriage ban. He requested a stay pending appeal the next day, which the Eighth Circuit granted on March 6, while also scheduling oral arguments for May 12 alongside three other same-sex marriage cases. Following the decision of the U.S. Supreme Court in Obergefell v. Hodges on June 26, 2015, Attorney General Peterson notified the Eighth Circuit that the state would no longer enforce its same-sex marriage ban. Same-sex couples began immediately marrying in Nebraska following the Supreme Court's ruling, with Kathy Pettersen and Beverly Reicks being the first same-sex couple to file marriage paperwork at the Douglas County Clerk's Office on June 26. Barbara DiBernard and Judith Gibson were the first to wed in Lancaster County, which contains the capital city of Lincoln. Susan and Sally Waters, plaintiffs in Waters, were issued a license on Friday, June 26 by the Douglas County Clerk, Tom Cavanaugh.

Governor Ricketts issued a statement critical of the Obergefell ruling but said the state would comply, "We will follow the law and respect the ruling outlined by the court." Attorney General Peterson said the court had "overstepped its proper role in our system of government". State tax officials quickly issued guidance for married same-sex couples, and the Department of Motor Vehicles started processing name changes for driver's licenses based on the marriage licenses of same-sex couples. Most Nebraska counties began immediately issuing marriage licenses to same-sex couples, or announced their willingness to do so. Officials in Buffalo, Dakota and Phelps counties initially reported they would not be issuing such licenses until they received further guidance from the state. However, both Governor Ricketts and Attorney General Peterson had announced by June 29 that the state would comply with the court's ruling and those counties promptly followed that guidance. The Sioux County Clerk, Michelle Zimmerman, was the only county clerk in Nebraska to expressly state she would not issue marriage licenses to same-sex couples, though the county's deputy clerk confirmed on July 11 that the office would process the marriage licenses of any same-sex couple who wishes to marry in the county. On July 1, the Eighth Circuit lifted the stay it had imposed on Judge Bataillon's order, allowing his prohibition on the enforcement of Nebraska's denial of marriage rights to same-sex couples to take effect. On February 6, 2016, Judge Bataillon issued a permanent injunction striking down the state's defunct same-sex marriage ban. Though a formality, the injunction ordered state officials to treat same-sex couples the same as opposite-sex couples in everything from processing marriage licenses to issuing birth certificates, the latter something the state had previously attempted to ban same-sex couples from amending.

== Native American nations ==
The Indian Civil Rights Act primarily aims to protect the rights of Native Americans but also reinforces the principle of tribal self-governance. While it does not grant sovereignty, the Act affirms the authority of tribes to govern their own legal affairs. Consequently, many tribes have enacted their own marriage and family laws. As a result, the Supreme Court's Obergefell ruling did not automatically apply to tribal jurisdictions. The Law and Order Code (Omaha–Ponca: Wéthigthoⁿ) of the Ponca Tribe of Nebraska states that the tribe must "ensure that couples of the same sex and couples of opposite sex have equal access to marriage". The change was decided by the Tribal Council on a meeting on August 26, 2018. During its monthly meeting in March 2022, two members of Tribal Council of the Winnebago Tribe of Nebraska proposed a motion to recognize same-sex marriages on the Winnebago Reservation. The motion was opposed by other council members who allegedly used homophobic language and called for LGBT people to be banned from the tribe. The motion to recognize same-sex marriages was voted down, with 4 of the 7 council members voting against. Following the vote, Tyler LaMere, a 17-year-old two-spirit tribal member, released a video on TikTok, which was viewed more than a million times, calling on tribal leaders to reconsider their decision. The social media campaign led to the Tribal Council reconsidering the decision during its April 11 meeting. Council member Isaac Smith, who had voted to ban same-sex marriage back in March, introduced a motion to reconsider that vote. It passed 5–0 with two abstentions. The council then voted to add provisions recognizing same-sex marriages to the Tribal Code (Ho-Chunk: Wooʼéhi). "There was a real humbleness of the leadership to apologize to the relatives that they had offended", said council member Victoria Kitcheyan. Same-sex marriages validly performed in other jurisdictions, including in the state of Nebraska, are legally recognized on the reservation of the Sac and Fox Nation of Missouri in Kansas and Nebraska. It is unclear if same-sex marriages are recognized on the reservation of the Iowa Tribe of Kansas and Nebraska, as tribal officials have not publicly commented on the issue.

Native Americans have deep-rooted marriage traditions, placing a strong emphasis on community, family and spiritual connections. While there are no records of same-sex marriages being performed in Native American cultures in the way they are commonly defined in Western legal systems, many Indigenous communities recognize identities and relationships that may be placed on the LGBT spectrum. Among these are two-spirit individuals—people who embody both masculine and feminine qualities. In some cultures, two-spirit individuals assigned male at birth wear women's clothing and engage in household and artistic work associated with the feminine sphere. Historically, this identity sometimes allowed for unions between two people of the same biological sex. The Winnebago call two-spirit individuals teją́cowįga (pronounced [teˈdʒãtʃowĩga]). They are believed to have been blessed by the spirit of the Moon, and are "holy and highly respected for special gifts such as prophesy, healing, artistry, and excelling at women's tasks". Many teją́cowįga married cisgender men without indication of polygyny. The Ponca refer to them as míⁿquga (pronounced [mĩꜜxʼuga]). They are believed to have been "instructed by the Moon", and would sometimes take men as partners. In the Chiwere language, two-spirit people are called mihxóge (pronounced [mihxoꜜgɛ]). "The mihxóge were respectfully treated as a special class of religious leaders. Among the late Baxoje, Jiwére-Ñút'achi elders, the mihxóge were still regarded with awe for their spiritual connection and consecrated role in harmony with the Holy Grandfather spirits. [...] They're half man, half woman. And they don't have (heterosexual) relationship(s). They do something (to fulfill needs) among themselves. [...] They're not crazy. They just got that born in them. Born in their nature." Two-spirit people have "visions of female deities or the Moon that serve to endorse their identity". Sauk two-spirit individuals, known as nîshwi manetôwaki, also characterize their gender role change as "an unfortunate destiny which they cannot avoid, being supposed to be impelled to this course by a vision from the female spirit that resides in the Moon." Traditionally, they were sacred and honored annually with a dance in which only those men who had had sexual intercourse with a nîshwi manetôwaki were allowed to participate.

== Demographics and marriage statistics ==
The 2020 U.S. census showed that there were 2,544 married same-sex couple households (1,032 male couples and 1,512 female couples) and 1,951 unmarried same-sex couple households in Nebraska.

== Public opinion ==
Public opinion for same-sex marriage in Nebraska
Poll source	Dates administered	Sample size	Margin of error	Support	Opposition	Do not know / refused
Public Religion Research Institute	February 28 – December 8, 2025	171 adults	?	67%	32%	1%
Public Religion Research Institute	March 13 – December 2, 2024	162 adults	?	63%	36%	1%
Public Religion Research Institute	March 9 – December 7, 2023	161 adults	?	54%	43%	3%
Public Religion Research Institute	March 11 – December 14, 2022	?	?	60%	33%	7%
Public Religion Research Institute	March 8 – November 9, 2021	?	?	58%	40%	2%
Public Religion Research Institute	January 7 – December 20, 2020	348 adults	?	69%	31%	<0.5%
Public Religion Research Institute	April 5 – December 23, 2017	519 adults	?	54%	33%	13%
Public Religion Research Institute	May 18, 2016 – January 10, 2017	747 adults	?	61%	27%	12%
Public Religion Research Institute	April 29, 2015 – January 7, 2016	587 adults	?	49%	43%	8%
Public Religion Research Institute	April 2, 2014 – January 4, 2015	360 adults	?	54%	39%	7%
New York Times/CBS News/YouGov	September 20 – October 1, 2014	721 likely voters	± 3.9%	40%	46%	14%
Public Policy Polling	September 30 – October 2, 2011	739 voters	± 3.6%	36%	54%	10%
Greenberg Quinlan Rosner Research	August 2–4, 2011	305 adults	± 4.0%	42%	51%	7%

== See also ==
- LGBT rights in Nebraska
- Nebraska Initiative 416
- Same-sex marriage in the United States
