= Andersen Corporation =

American door and window company

- Type: Private
- Industry: Manufacturing
- Founded: July 25, 1903; Hudson, Wisconsin
- Founder: Hans Andersen and family
- Headquarters: Bayport, Minnesota, United States
- Area served: Worldwide
- Products: Windows and Doors
- Revenue: ▲US$3 billion
- Number of employees: 13,000 (2023)
- Subsidiaries: Andersen Windows, Inc.; Renewal by Andersen Corporation; EMCO Enterprises
- Website: www.andersencorporation.com

Andersen Corporation is an international window and door manufacturing corporation headquartered in Bayport, Minnesota.

Andersen ranked No. 146 on Forbes List of America's Largest Private Companies, with $3 billion in annual sales for the fiscal year ending on December 31, 2021, and #185 on Forbes list of America's best large employers in 2022. Andersen Corporation and its affiliates make up the largest window and door manufacturer in North America.

Andersen Corporation and its subsidiaries manufacture and market window and door products under the names Andersen, Renewal by Andersen, MQ, and Heritage. Andersen has manufacturing facilities in the United States, Canada, and Italy. Andersen's production facility in Bayport, Minnesota, comprises an 8-million-square-foot (740×10^{3} m^{2}) area spread over 65 acres (26 ha).

The company is a private corporation; it has an employee stock ownership plan but is primarily owned by the Andersen family.

== History ==
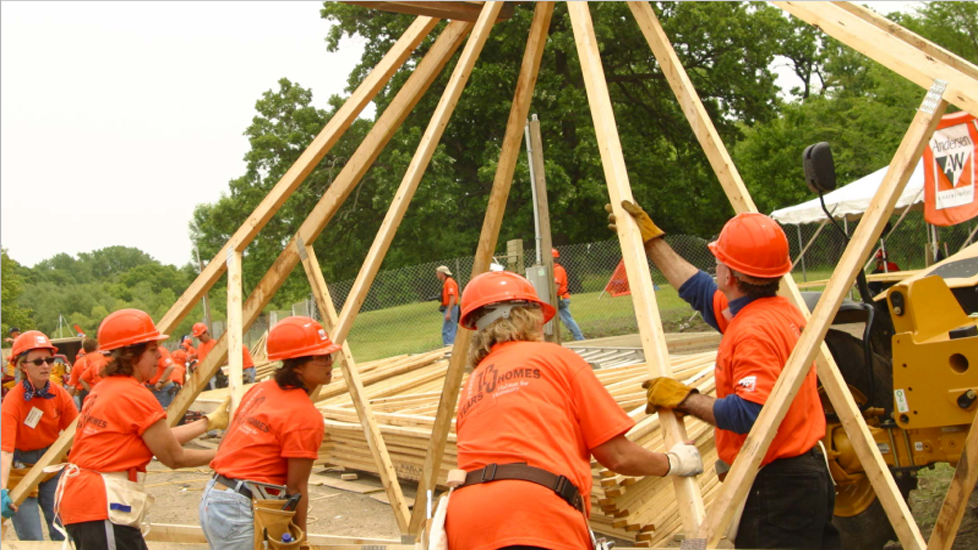

Andersen Corporation was founded in 1903 as the Andersen Lumber Company by Danish immigrant Hans Jacob Andersen and his family in Hudson, Wisconsin. In 1929, the name of the firm was changed to Andersen Frame Company, and again in 1937 to Andersen Corporation.

Andersen Lumber Company was originally based in Hudson, where logs arrived at their location via the St. Croix River. In 1908, Hans Andersen sold the lumberyards to devote all the company's efforts to the window frame business. Needing room for expansion, Andersen built a factory in 1913 in South Stillwater (now Bayport, Minnesota). In 1914, Fred C. Andersen became president. In 1916, Andersen resumed operating the lumber business.

When metals were scarce during World War II, Andersen began producing windows using parts less metal and other material to support the war effort. Andersen Corporation also made wooden ammunition boxes for the war effort, which resulted in "Excellence in Production" ("E") awards from the United States Army, and United States Navy.

=== Recent history ===
Renewal by Andersen was founded in 1995 and in 2015 opened a 125,000 square-foot manufacturing plant expansion.

In 2015 Andersen announced an $18 million expansion of its Bayport operations. In the same year, the company added more than 300 jobs as part of a $45 million expansion project at its Renewal manufacturing facility in Cottage Grove and its Fibrex extrusion plant in North Branch.

In October, 2017, Andersen acquired Quebec-based Fenêtres MQ Inc., a Quebec-based manufacturer of high-end doors and windows.

In January 2018, Andersen acquired Frontier Tooling and Design Corp, an extrusion tooling supplier in Huntington, West Virginia. In March 2018, Andersen acquired Heritage Windows and Doors, a manufacturer of custom aluminum doors and windows in Gilbert, Arizona.

Andersen opened a new manufacturing facility in Menomonie, Wisconsin in 2000.

In December 2025, Andersen announced its acquisition of Bright Wood Corporation, a window and patio door component manufacturer based in Madras, Oregon.

== Legal issues ==
In September 2018, Renewal by Andersen was named in an EEOC complaint for discriminating against women and older workers in employment by targeting job ads on Facebook to younger men only. In September 2019, the EEOC ruled that Renewal by Andersen violated the Civil Rights act and the Age Discrimination in Employment Act.

In August 2019, Renewal by Andersen was fined $50,000 by the District of Columbia for refusing service to people in certain zip codes, in violation of the District's Human Rights Act.

In October 2022, Andersen reached a settlement with the Minnesota Department of Human Rights after withdrawing a job offer after learning that an applicant had a disability. The company claimed that the applicant would not be able to operate a forklift, but operating a forklift was not in the job description and the applicant had documentation that they could do so safely if needed. The company agreed to pay the former applicant $41,000, the equivalent of a year's pay, and agreed to take steps to become a more inclusive workplace.

== Philanthropy ==
The Bayport Foundation, the precursor to the Andersen Corporate Foundation, was established in 1941. The foundation's first gift was $100 to Carleton College in Northfield, Minnesota. As of April 2012, the foundation has donated more than $50 million to a wide range of nonprofit organizations.

A Scouting America camp located on the St. Croix River and operated by Northern Star Council was named after former Andersen president Fred C. Andersen; the camp's name was later updated to Andersen Scout Camp.
