= Article I, Section 29 =

Article I, Section 29 may refer to:

- Nebraska Initiative 416
- Utah Constitutional Amendment 3
