= List of civil rights agencies in the United States =

This is a list of state-level agencies in the United States dedicated to advancing human and civil rights. There are 44 such agencies.

State	Agency
Alaska	Commission for Human Rights
Arizona	Attorney General's Office – Civil Rights Division
Arkansas	Fair Housing Commission
California	Attorney General's Office – Civil Rights Department
Colorado	Civil Rights Division
Connecticut	Commission on Human Rights & Opportunities
Delaware	Secretary of State's Division of Human and Civil Rights
District of Columbia	Office of Human Rights
Florida	Commission on Human Relations Office of Civil Rights
Georgia (U.S. state)	Commission on Equal Opportunity
Hawaii	Civil Rights Commission
Idaho	Human Rights Commission
Illinois	Illinois Department of Human Rights
Indiana	Civil Rights Commission
Iowa	Civil Rights Commission
Kansas	Human Rights Commission
Kentucky	Commission on Human Rights
Louisiana	Commission on Human Rights
Maine	Human Rights Commission
Maryland	Commission on Human Relations
Massachusetts	Massachusetts Commission Against Discrimination
Michigan	Michigan Department of Civil Rights
Minnesota	Minnesota Department of Human Rights
Missouri	Commission on Human Rights
Montana	Human Rights Bureau
Nebraska	Nebraska Equal Opportunity Commission
Nevada	Equal Rights Commission
New Hampshire	Commission for Human Rights
New Jersey	Division on Civil Rights
New Mexico	Human Rights Bureau
New York	New York State Division of Human Rights
North Carolina	Civil Rights Division
North Dakota	Department of Labor and Human Rights
Ohio	Ohio Civil Rights Commission
Oklahoma	Office of Civil Rights Enforcement
Oregon	Civil Rights Commission
Pennsylvania	Human Relations Commission
Rhode Island	Commission for Human Rights
South Carolina	Human Affairs Commission
South Dakota	Division of Human Rights
Tennessee	Human Rights Commission
Texas	Civil Rights Division
Utah	Antidiscrimination and Labor Division
Vermont	Human Rights Commission
Virginia	Office of Civil Rights
Washington (state)	State Human Rights Commission
West Virginia	Human Rights Commission
Wisconsin	Equal Rights Division
Wyoming	Department of Workforce Services: Your Labor Rights

== See also ==
- Civil rights in the United States
- Human rights in the United States
