= Gerald Heaney =

American judge (1918–2010)

Gerald W. Heaney

Senior Judge of the United States Court of Appeals for the Eighth Circuit
- In office December 31, 1988 – August 31, 2006

Judge of the United States Court of Appeals for the Eighth Circuit
- In office November 3, 1966 – December 31, 1988
- Appointed by: Lyndon B. Johnson
- Preceded by: Seat established by 80 Stat. 75
- Succeeded by: James B. Loken

Personal details
- Born: Gerald William Heaney; January 29, 1918 Goodhue, Minnesota, U.S.
- Died: June 22, 2010 (aged 92) Duluth, Minnesota, U.S.
- Education: University of Minnesota (BSL, LLB)

Gerald William Heaney (January 29, 1918 – June 22, 2010) served for nearly forty years as a United States Circuit judge of the United States Court of Appeals for the Eighth Circuit, from his appointment by President Lyndon B. Johnson in November 1966 until his full retirement in August 2006.

Between the end of World War II and his appointment to the federal bench, he rewrote the Free State of Bavaria's labor laws, and was a valued political advisor and organizer for several liberal Democratic politicians, including Hubert Humphrey, Adlai Stevenson, Orville Freeman, Eugene McCarthy, and Walter Mondale. As an appellate court judge, Heaney typically favored broad interpretations of the Bill of Rights and civil rights, labor and employment rights statutes.

== Personal background ==
Heaney was born in the farming community of Goodhue, in southeastern Minnesota, on January 29, 1918. He was one of seven children of a butcher (William J. Heaney) and his wife (Johanna (Ryan) Heaney). Heaney's involvement in political campaigns began with the 1928 presidential election, when, as a ten-year-old, he assisted in posting campaign signs for New York Governor and Democratic Nominee Al Smith. Heaney came of age during the Great Depression. He attended the College (now University) of St. Thomas, then transferred to the University of Minnesota, where he received a Bachelor of Science in Law degree in 1939. Upon graduation he enrolled in the University of Minnesota Law School. Heaney received his Bachelor of Laws in 1941, and then worked in the securities division of the Minnesota Department of Commerce. However, his legal career was soon interrupted by the United States' entry into World War II.

== Service in World War II ==
2nd Rangers Battalion sleeve insignia

In 1942, at age 24, Heaney enlisted. After the United States Marines rejected him due to color blindness, he enlisted as a private in the United States Army. He then volunteered for the United States Rangers, and would soon be commissioned as a second lieutenant in Company C of the Second Ranger Battalion, then in intense training to serve as a spearhead in Operation Overlord, the Allied invasion of western Europe.

Organizers of Operation Overlord decided that Ranger Company C would constitute Ranger "Task Force B". Unlike Ranger Task Force A (which scaled Pointe du Hoc, as depicted in The Longest Day) and Ranger Task Force C (which landed in Dog Green sector of Omaha Beach as depicted at the outset of Saving Private Ryan), the story of Task Force B on D-Day is lesser-known. In the first minutes of the invasion's amphibious landing, Task Force B disembarked in "Charlie" sector of Omaha Beach. That sector was located at Omaha Beach's far western end, where the beach abruptly terminates in a rocky promontory of 100-foot cliffs called Pointe de la Percee. The Task Force's mission included taking out the four German pillboxes at the top of the cliffs, as part of coordinated actions with Rangers' efforts to take the Vierville draw (to the east) and Pointe du Hoc (to the west).

In a Library of Congress oral history interview conducted by Congressman James Oberstar, Heaney recounted the first moments of the battle: "At 6:30 we arrived close to the beach. We could not quite get into the beach because of the obstacles that the Germans had placed under water and also had proximity bombs that would blow up ships. They were having trouble getting the vessels in, so they could not get to the beach, but they got into relatively shallow water. And the door went down on the landing craft, and the captain stood up and said, everyone ashore, and he was cut down by gunfire. And the first lieutenant stood up and said, everyone ashore, and he was cut down by gunfire. And then that left me, Second Lieutenant Gerald Heaney, in charge, and I looked up and said, we are not going out that door; everybody over the side." Unfortunately, the landing craft had stopped in water over the heads of the soldiers, most of whom were burdened down by packs and equipment. Only by cutting loose their equipment and then swimming to shore could most of them avoid drowning.

Only half of the members of Task Force B reached the relative safety at the foot of the cliff. The Task Force's preferred route to the high ground – through the Vierville draw in Dog Green sector – had quickly become a killing zone, forcing Task Force B to find a route directly up the face of the cliff. Without the London fire ladders that helped Task Force A to take Pointe du Hoc, and with most of their other climbing equipment at the bottom of the Channel, Task Force B's surviving Rangers used bayonets thrust into the cliffs as footholds, and eventually reached the crest of Pointe de la Percee. There, control of the trenches surrounding the pillboxes switched back and forth between German and American forces for hours, further depleting the Company's ammunition and manpower. By the end of the battle, Task Force B secured Charlie sector, but at great cost in lives. For his heroism on D-Day, Second Lieutenant Heaney was awarded the Silver Star.

After D-Day, the Second Ranger Battalion served alongside regular infantry units in areas such as the Cherbourg peninsula (in June–July 1944), Brest (in August–September 1944), the Crozon peninsula (September 1944), LeFret (September 1944) and the Hürtgen Forest (in December 1944). For his courage in battles after D-Day, Heaney was awarded a Bronze Star.

By May 1945, Heaney's unit had reached so deeply into Axis-held territory that it crossed Germany's pre-1938 eastern border, entering areas of Bohemia that later would be turned over to Soviet control and become a part of Czechoslovakia (now a part of the Czech Republic). There, as Germany's surrender was imminent, Heaney – now a captain—was responsible for a poignant moment. American, British, and Soviet forces had met and were preparing for a flag-raising ceremony, when Heaney recognized that no American flag was available. Heaney went into a nearby village, found swatches of red, white and blue cloth, and seamstresses, and convinced them to create a 48-star United States flag in time for the ceremony. That impromptu flag returned home with Captain Heaney, and serves as a cherished feature of many patriotic events in Duluth.

Because of the Second Ranger Battalion's extraordinary service, General Omar Bradley permitted them to return home as a group. Before returning, however, Heaney assisted the new government of Bavaria in West Germany to revise its labor laws, helping to organize a free trade movement. Heaney left the service in 1946.

== Political and legal career ==
Upon his return to Minnesota, Heaney moved to Duluth, practicing labor law with the Lewis, Hammer, Heaney, Weyl and Halverson firm, and becoming deeply involved in activities of Minnesota's Democratic-Farmer-Labor (DFL) Party. By 1948, he soon found himself in the middle of a watershed year in the history that party, as a new generation of young liberals led by future governor Orville Freeman and Minneapolis Mayor (and United States Senate Candidate) Hubert Humphrey wrested control of the party away from supporters of third-party presidential candidate Henry Wallace, while at the same time building the foundation for a 30-year political dynasty. Among that group, Heaney was considered "one of the shrewdest politicians in Minnesota", and became a Democratic national committeeman in 1955. Heaney became involved in Adlai Stevenson's 1956 presidential campaign. In Minnesota Senator Hubert Humphrey's unsuccessful run for the democratic presidential nomination in 1960, Heaney served as a campaign manager. In 1964 he was appointed by the Minnesota Legislature to fill a vacancy on the Board of Regents of the University of Minnesota.

Heaney's political career was not without its setbacks. In May 1960, during the DFL convention, he was unseated as a member of the Democratic National Committee. Newspapers reported that "his foes called him high-handed, arrogant and ruthless." In 1965, the Minnesota Legislature ended his career as a university regent, even though he was an incumbent and the governor's nominee for reappointment, and the legislature had not failed to reappoint a regent for twelve years. His rejection was attributed to conservatives in the legislature.

== Federal judicial service ==
Heaney was nominated by President Lyndon B. Johnson on September 9, 1966, to the United States Court of Appeals for the Eighth Circuit, to a new seat authorized by 80 Stat. 75. His nomination came upon the recommendation of former Minnesota Governor and then Secretary of Agriculture Orville Freeman. Freeman noted in his letter to President Johnson that Heaney was a close personal friend, had served as a Democratic National Committee member from Minnesota, was an excellent lawyer, and a supporter of Johnson's Great Society program. Heaney was confirmed by the United States Senate on October 20, 1966, and received his commission on November 3, 1966. He entered active service in December 1966. He assumed senior status on December 31, 1988. His service terminated on August 31, 2006, due to his retirement.

=== Judicial philosophy and law clerks ===
The Heaney appointment was one of three by Johnson to the Eighth Circuit that collectively altered the balance of the court. Heaney, along with Johnson nominees Myron H. Bright of North Dakota and Donald P. Lay of Nebraska and Iowa, "were more likely to vote for civil liberties claims and were more willing to accept an activist judiciary (as well as more likely to publish dissents) than their predecessors." Judges Heaney, Lay and Bright also shared a relative youthfulness at the time of appointment and a commitment to public service that led each of them to remain on the bench for many decades; the three served, collectively, over 129 years on the Eighth Circuit. According to Judge Bright, Judge Heaney hired the Eighth Circuit's first woman law clerk (Rebecca Knittle, in 1970), and its first African-American law clerk (Henry L. Jones, Jr., later a United States Magistrate Judge in Little Rock, Arkansas).

== School desegregation in St. Louis, Missouri ==
During Heaney's tenure on the Eighth Circuit, school desegregation suits arising in cities such as Little Rock, St. Louis and Kansas City were among the court's most complex and lengthy proceedings. Judge Heaney played a particularly personal role in the St. Louis desegregation case, and wrote every appellate opinion in the case after 1980. The case involved implementation of a voluntary city-county transfer plan, and eventually drew 13,000 black students to county schools from the city, which Heaney credits for an increase in the percentage of black students who graduated from high school and went on to college. In 2004, after recusing himself from the St. Louis desegregation cases, Judge Heaney co-authored (with Dr. Susan Uchitelle, a former law clerk), a book on segregation and desegregation in the St. Louis school systems entitled Unending Struggle: The Long Road to an Equal Education in St. Louis.

== Influential opinions ==
In Chess v. Widmar, 635 F.2d 1310, 1320 (8th Cir. 1980), members of a religious student organization at the University of Missouri-Kansas City alleged that university officials violated their right to free exercise of religion under the First Amendment by refusing to grant them equal access to university facilities. Writing for the Eighth Circuit, Judge Heaney agreed, holding that once a university opens its facilities for certain groups, it must keep them open for all groups. The United States Supreme Court granted certiorari, and in Widmar v. Vincent, 454 U.S. 263 (1981) affirmed this ruling.

In Brenden v. Independent School District No. 742, 477 F.2d 1292, 1300 (8th Cir. 1973), two female students who requested to participate in non-contact sports at schools that offered no varsity teams for females brought an action claiming that a state high school league rule prohibiting females from participating with males in interscholastic sports violated the Fourteenth Amendment's Equal Protection Clause. Writing for the court, Judge Heaney found the rule unconstitutional, holding that the activities were non-contact and the females displayed the ability to compete with males.

In U.S. v. City of Black Jack, Missouri, 508 F.2d 1179 (8th Cir. 1974), cert. denied, 422 U.S. 1042 (1975), the Eighth Circuit became one of the first United States Courts of Appeals to decide what standards should apply to challenges under the Civil Rights Act of 1968, otherwise known as the Fair Housing Act, to zoning decisions that allegedly had a disproportionate impact on the ability of residents of segregated communities to move to desegregated communities. Writing for the court, Judge Heaney found that the city's actions violated the act because of its disparate impact on the ability of minority group residents of St. Louis to relocate to suburban Black Jack, and because Black Jack's justification did not satisfy a rigorous standard. The Supreme Court declined to review the case, and for many years Judge Heaney's analysis was cited approvingly by other federal courts interpreting the act.

In Consolidated Freightways Corp. of Delaware v. Kassel, 612 F.2d 1064 (8th Cir. 1979), aff'd, 450 U.S. 662 (1981), Iowa's prohibition of extra-long semitrailer trucks was alleged to unconstitutionally burden interstate commerce, in violation of what is known as the dormant Commerce Clause. The court upheld the claim and struck down the requirement. In the court's opinion, Judge Heaney reasoned that, while "some burdening of interstate commerce will be tolerated" for the sake of safety, The Iowa regulation failed because it burdened interstate commerce and failed to directly protect a state safety interest. Two years later, the United States Supreme Court affirmed this ruling.

== Later activities ==
Gerald and Eleanor Heaney continued to live in Duluth, where he worked to raise money for scholarships for students attending the University of Minnesota-Duluth. Free again to become involved in partisan politics, in late 2006 he volunteered at local DFL Party campaign offices, and in March 2007 endorsed John Edwards' bid for the 2008 Democratic nomination for president. In the fall of 2007 he served as co-chair of Don Ness's successful campaign for mayor of Duluth.

== Honors ==
The federal courthouse and customhouse in Duluth, and residence hall at the University of Minnesota-Duluth, are named in Heaney's honor. In 2001 he received an honorary Doctor of Laws Degree for Public Service from the University of Minnesota-Duluth.

== Death ==
Heaney died June 22, 2010, in Duluth, Minnesota.

Legal offices
Preceded by Seat established by 80 Stat. 75	Judge of the United States Court of Appeals for the Eighth Circuit; 1966–1988	Succeeded by James B. Loken
