= Massachusetts Commission Against Discrimination =

Primary agency for civil rights law enforcement in Massachusetts

The Massachusetts Commission Against Discrimination (MCAD) is the primary agency for civil rights law enforcement, outreach, and training in the Commonwealth of Massachusetts. Following the recommendation of a 1944 committee appointed by Governor of Massachusetts Maurice Tobin to establish a commission to enforce laws prohibiting discrimination on the basis of race, color, religious creed, national origin, or ancestry, the Massachusetts General Court created the Fair Employment Practices Commission in 1946. The Commission took 96 complaints, conducted 60 interviews, and handled 500 phone inquiries in its first year alone. The name was changed to the current name in 1950 to reflect the expansion of its jurisdiction and power from employment to housing and public accommodations.

A legal reporter with Massachusetts Commission Against Discrimination cases, commentary, and subject matter indices is provided by Landlaw Inc. and MCAD decisions can also be found on Westlaw.com

== Location ==
MCAD is located in Boston.

== See also ==
- List of civil rights agencies in the United States
