= South Carolina Human Affairs Commission =

South Carolina civil rights agency

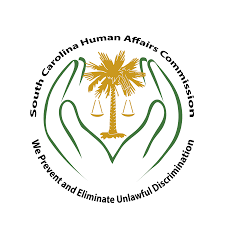
- Official seal

Agency overview
- Formed: 1972
- Jurisdiction: Government of South Carolina
- Headquarters: Columbia, South Carolina
- Motto: We prevent and eliminate unlawful discrimination
- Employees: 51 (2025)
- Annual budget: $6.1 m USD (2025)
- Agency executive: Alisa Warren, Commissioner
- Website: https://schac.sc.gov/

The South Carolina Human Affairs Commission, commonly referred to as "SCHAC", is an executive civil rights agency that addresses claims of discrimination in employment, housing, public accommodations, and public services. The Commission has the authority to investigate, mediate, and adjudicate claims arising from anti-discrimination state laws. It also manages the state's affirmative action plans and provides compliance training and materials to employers, landlords, and citizens. It is one of 44 state human & civil rights agencies in the United States.

The Commission is a small agency with 51 full-time employees. Representative James E. Clyburn (D-SC) served as the second Commissioner of SCHAC. He held that position until 1992.

== History ==
In the wake of the Civil Rights Movement, President Lyndon B. Johnson signed the Civil Rights Act of 1964. Racial unrest continued in South Carolina, evidenced by the 1968 Orangeburg massacre and the anti-integration protests at Lamar High School (South Carolina). The South Carolina General Assembly passed, and Governor John Carl West signed into law, the South Carolina Human Affairs Law ("HAL") in 1972, which was modeled after the 1964 Civil Rights Act. The HAL created SCHAC, enabling it to enforce new prohibitions against certain types of discrimination in employment. This included investigation, mediation, monitoring of employer practices, training employers, and implementing affirmative action policies in state agencies. In the wake of Governor West's death, Clyburn remarked that the creation of the Commission was "breaking ground" and that "No Southern state was doing what John West was doing. None."

In 1989, the South Carolina Fair Housing Law (FHL) expanded the Commission's mission scope to include certain housing discrimination claims.

In the 2010s, the Commission's employment discrimination purview grew to encompass protections for pregnancy and lactation when the General Assembly enacted the Pregnancy Accommodation Act and the Lactation Support Act. The PAA provides workplaces and employment protections for expecting and new mothers, while the LSA provides support and protections for employees expressing milk at work. The LSA served as the model for federal legislation enacted in 2020.

== Authority and organization ==
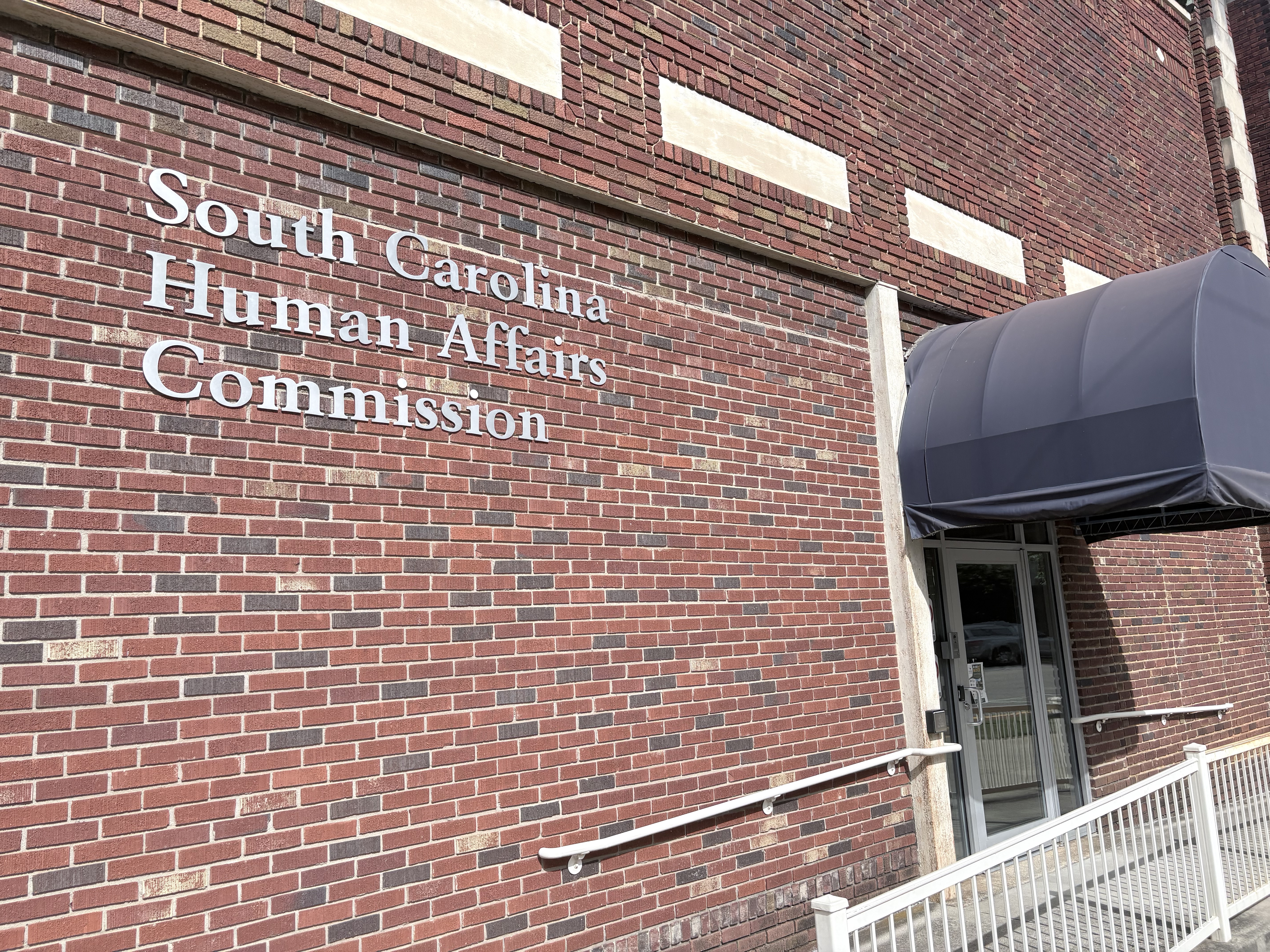
SCHAC office building in Columbia, South Carolina

The Commission receives its authority from enabling acts passed by the General Assembly. These are the South Carolina Human Affairs Law, the South Carolina Fair Housing Law, the Equal Enjoyment and Privileges to Public Accommodations Act, the Pregnancy Accommodation Act, and the Lactation Support Act. These statutes, in turn, allow the Commission to promulgate administrative rules to administer the law.

=== Governing Board and Commissioner ===
The Commission is overseen by a Governing Board with nine seats–one seat for each of the seven congressional districts and two at-large seats. The Board members are appointed by the Governor and confirmed by the state Senate for a term of three years.

Governing Board of the South Carolina Human Affairs Commission (as of September 2025)
| District | Member | Appointed Date | Expiration Date |
|---|---|---|---|
| 1st District | Mary Amonitti | May 11, 2022 | June 30, 2023 |
| 2nd District | Patrick Palmer | May 8, 2025 | June 30, 2026 |
| 3rd District | Vacant | – | – |
| 4th District | James Wilson | May 8, 2025 | June 30, 2027 |
| 5th District | Andrew Williams | February 2, 2017 | June 30, 2019 |
| 6th District | Sharon Sellers | May 12, 2022 | June 30, 2025 |
| 7th District | Harold Jean Brown | March 6, 2015 | June 30, 2018 |
| At-Large | Leon Winn | April 23, 2025 | June 30, 2026 |
| At-Large | Steve Hall | April 28, 2025 | June 30, 2027 |

As noted in a 2014 General Assembly Audit, the Board routinely experiences prolonged vacancies and appointments exceeding the statutory limit. As of January 2026, one-third of the Board is serving beyond their appointed term, and the Governor has not nominated a replacement. One seat remains vacant.

The day-to-day operations of the Commission are led by a separate, appointed Commissioner who is the Chief Administrative Officer. Notable former Commissioners include:

- Dr. Willis Ham, 2025 recipient of the Smith-Hammond-Middleton Social Justice Award in honor of the victims of the Orangeburg Massacre (1992–2000)
- U.S. House Representative Jim Clyburn (1974–1992)
- Dr. George D. Hamilton, the first black man to serve as the head of a South Carolina state agency since the Reconstruction Era (1972–1974)

In January 2026, Gov. McMaster appointed Alisa Warren as Commissioner, replacing the long-serving interim Commissioner Marvin Caldwell, Jr.

=== Organizational divisions ===
==== Technical Services & Community Relations ====
This Division handles claims of discrimination in public accommodations, publishes annual affirmative action reports, and organizes anti-discrimination events and resources.

The Equal Enjoyment and Privileges to Public Accommodations Act of 1990 outlawed discrimination in public accommodations on the basis of race, color, religion, or national origin. The Commission is enabled to mediate, but not prosecute, these claims.

Pursuant to the Human Affairs Law, all state agencies must file an affirmative action plan with the Commission each year for review, which in turn files an annual report on the state of affirmative action in South Carolina to the General Assembly. These plans may only be voluntarily enforced by the submitting agency; the Commission cannot compel enforcement.

This Division also provides community-facing trainings and events centered around anti-discrimination efforts, like anti-discrimination training for employers and landlords or "End Racism" events for citizens. As part of this effort, the Commission historically supported local conciliation commissions. In the wake of federal scrutiny of "DEI" and grants to state and local governments during the second Trump presidency, the Charleston City Council voted to disband its Human Affairs and Racial Conciliation Commission.

==== Employment ====
The founding mission of the Commission was to address discrimination in private and public employment made unlawful by either federal or state law. This includes hiring, management, and firing decisions based on a protected class. The employment division, with assistance from the enforcement division, intakes, investigates, and mediates claims of employment discrimination on the basis of age (for those over 40), color, disability, national origin, race, religion, sex, or pregnancy. It also has jurisdiction over claims of sexual harassment or retaliation for pursuing a discrimination claim.

Following the United States Supreme Court decision in Bostock v. Clayton County (2020), the Commission began interpreting "sex discrimination" to include discrimination on the basis of sexual orientation. Prior to the Bostock ruling, the Commission never recognized sexual orientation discrimination, even after the EEOC issued interpretative guidance instructing to do so during the Obama Administration.

==== Fair Housing ====
The Commission received authority to handle housing discrimination claims in 1989, following the passage of the South Carolina Fair Housing Law. The FHL made it unlawful to refuse to sell or rent a dwelling on the basis of race, color, religion, sex, familial status, national origin, or handicapping condition (disability). The law also prohibits such discrimination in the terms and conditions of a rental or sale, threats based on a protected class, or retaliation against someone filing a fair housing claim.

The Commission publishes statistics on the number of compliants lodged against homeowner associations and other housing providers.

In the 2020 case of South Carolina Human Affairs Commission v. Chen, the South Carolina Supreme Court upheld the constitutionality of the state's FHL after a district court held it unconstitutionally vague.

As part of its charge to prevent disability discrimination in housing, the Commission has sued landlords that wrongfully deny a tenant's request to keep a service animal in their unit. In other cases, the Commission has reached settlement agreements on behalf of aggrieved tenants resulting in monetary damages payments.

=== Federal cooperation ===
The Equal Employment Opportunity Commission ("EEOC") and the Department of Housing and Urban Development ("HUD") have work-sharing agreements with the Commission, allowing the Commission to handle claims that originate in South Carolina and were filed under comparable federal laws, like the Americans with Disabilities Act, Fair Housing Act, Title VII of the Civil Rights Act of 1964, and the Age Discrimination in Employment Act.

Historically, the EEOC–SCHAC agreements allowed the EEOC to fund SCHAC investigations of disparate-impact claims, as both federal and state law outlawed disparate-impact discrimination and authorized the respective agencies to pursue such claims. However, in May 2025, the EEOC halted funding for state investigations of disparate-impact allegations. President Trump also issued an Executive order ordering Executive agencies to "eliminate the use of disparate-impact liability in all contexts to the maximum degree possible." These changes may make it more difficult for state civil rights agencies, like SCHAC, to investigate and challenge disparate-impact violations.

== Notable incidents ==
=== 1986 Citadel racial incident ===
In October 1986, a black cadet at The Citadel, a senior military college in Charleston, was harassed by five white cadets who burned paper crosses in front of his room while dressed as Ku Klux Klan members. In response, Governor Richard W. Riley directed the Commission to investigate the incident and issue findings as to the college's response. The Commission condemned college-president James A. Grimsley for not doing more to communicate the harshness of the students' punishment and clearly stating intolerance for racial intolerance. Commissioner Clyburn cited a "significant amount of insensitivity on [the college's] campus".

The Commission also promised to investigate other potentially-offensive events at The Citadel, like the use of the Confederate battle flag at football games and the invocation of "Dixie" as the college's official fight song.

=== Funding controversies ===
In 2014, an independent audit by the General Assembly found that the Commission misappropriated HUD grant funds by spending them to cover administrative costs.

In 2025, members of the South Carolina Freedom Caucus, a group of ultra-conservative Republican lawmakers, unsuccessfully attempted to defund the Commission along with many other agencies and initiatives. Caucus leader Jordan Pace called the group's effort a "fundamental reshaping of the way we think about government". House Majority leader Davey Hiott defended the Commission's continued funding, stating in response to Pace that "[o]ur disabled and special needs kids are not crap to me." The House rejected the defunding attempt; the state budget for the 2025–26 fiscal year allocated $6.1 million USD to the Commission. The Freedom Caucus attempted to defund the Commission the next year, arguing its services duplicated that of federal agencies.

== See also ==
- Civil right acts in the United States
- List of civil rights agencies in the United States
- South Carolina in the civil rights movement
