= William J. Riley =

American judge (1947–2023)

William Jay Riley
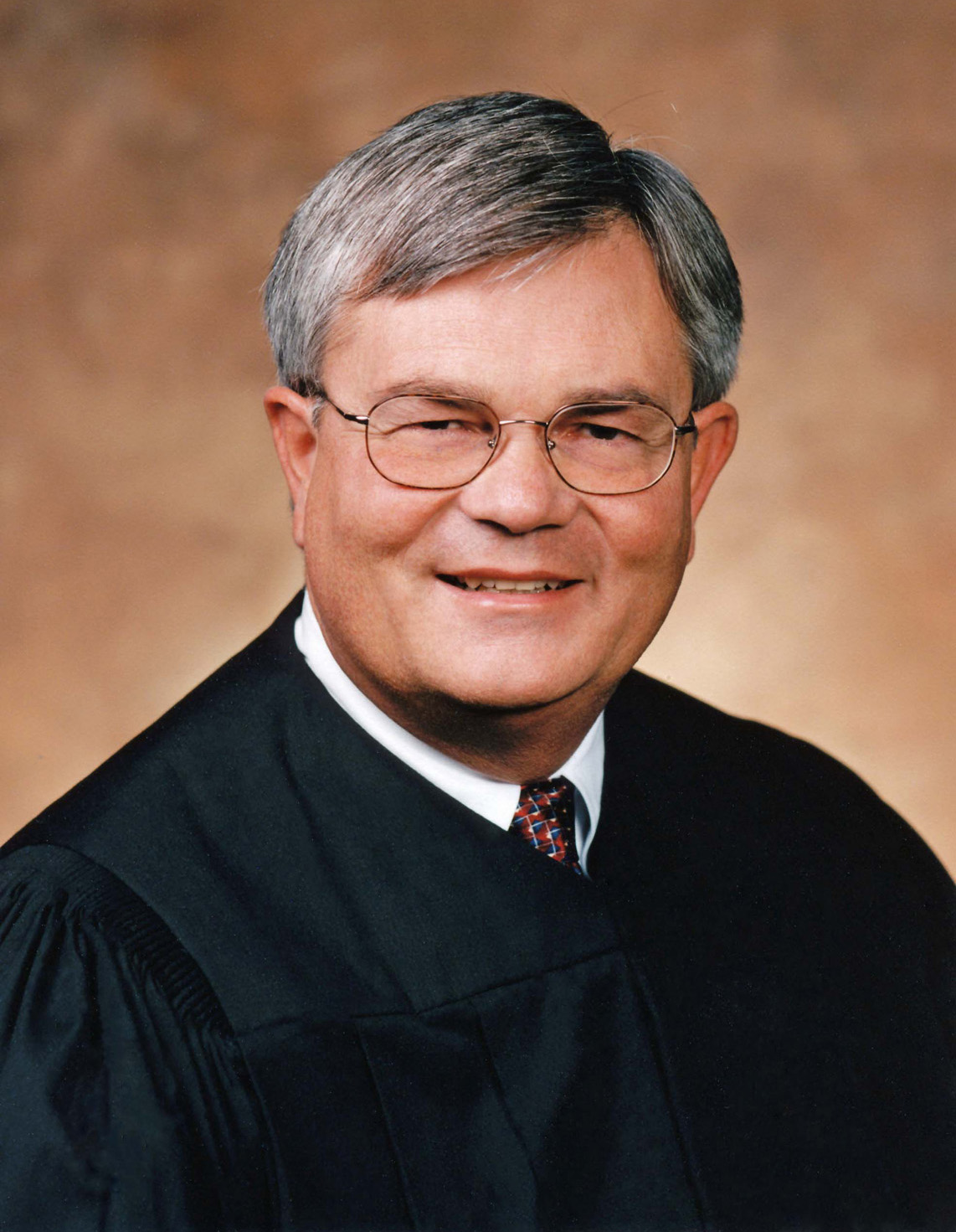

Senior Judge of the United States Court of Appeals for the Eighth Circuit
- In office June 30, 2017 – January 27, 2023

Chief Judge of the United States Court of Appeals for the Eighth Circuit
- In office March 31, 2010 – March 11, 2017
- Preceded by: James B. Loken
- Succeeded by: Lavenski Smith

Judge of the United States Court of Appeals for the Eighth Circuit
- In office August 3, 2001 – June 30, 2017
- Appointed by: George W. Bush
- Preceded by: C. Arlen Beam
- Succeeded by: L. Steven Grasz

Personal details
- Born: March 11, 1947 Lincoln, Nebraska, U.S.
- Died: January 27, 2023 (aged 75)
- Education: University of Nebraska–Lincoln (BA, JD)

William Jay Riley (March 11, 1947 – January 27, 2023) was a United States circuit judge of the United States Court of Appeals for the Eighth Circuit.

== Education and background ==
Riley received a Bachelor of Arts degree from the University of Nebraska–Lincoln and earned his Juris Doctor at the University of Nebraska College of Law. Following graduation, he was a law clerk to Eighth Circuit Judge Donald P. Lay, and then he was in private practice until his appointment to the Eighth Circuit. From 2006 to 2023, he taught as an adjunct professor at the Creighton University School of Law and the University of Nebraska College of Law.

== Federal judicial service ==
On May 23, 2001, he was nominated by President George W. Bush to a seat vacated by Judge C. Arlen Beam. He was swiftly confirmed 97–0 by the United States Senate just over two months later on August 2, 2001. He received his commission on August 3, 2001. He assumed senior status on June 30, 2017, and inactive senior status on August 31, 2017.

== Personal life and death ==
Riley died on January 27, 2023, at the age of 75.

Legal offices
Preceded by C. Arlen Beam	Judge of the United States Court of Appeals for the Eighth Circuit; 2001–2017	Succeeded by L. Steven Grasz
Preceded by James B. Loken	Chief Judge of the United States Court of Appeals for the Eighth Circuit; 2010–2017	Succeeded by Lavenski Smith
