= Nebraska Legislative Bill 89 =

2025 Nebraska law

Nebraska Legislature
- Long title: A BILL FOR AN ACT relating to public health and welfare; to adopt the Stand With Women Act; and to provide for severability.
- Territorial extent: Nebraska
- Enacted by: Nebraska Legislature
- Enacted: May 28, 2025
- Signed by: Jim Pillen
- Signed: June 4, 2025
- Effective: September 3, 2025
- Introduced by: Kathleen Kauth (R-31)
- Introduced: January 10, 2025
- Voting summary: 33 voted for; 16 voted against

Summary
- Modifies the definitions of male, female, and related terms in state law so as to connect them to biological sex and restricts school sports to biological sex in most circumstances.

Keywords
- female, male, sex, student athlete, transgender
- Status: Not yet in force

Nebraska Legislative Bill 89 (LB 89), also known as the Stand With Women Act, is a 2025 law in the state of Nebraska that modifies the definitions of male, female, sex, and related terms in state law and restricts school sports to specific sexes under most circumstances. It was signed into law by Governor Jim Pillen on June 4, 2025. It took effect on September 3, 2025.

The bill primarily addresses transgender Nebraskans, especially trans women.

== Provisions ==
LB 89 requires any school in the state of Nebraska, including colleges and universities, to mandate students only compete in sports that align with their biological sex, and not their gender identity. Exceptions are included for coed sports and sports without a female equivalent league.

LB 89 also modifies the definitions of male, female, and other similar terms in state law. It defines female as somebody who produces ova and male as somebody who produces sperm.

The bill was originally intended to also include a bathroom bill and restrict locker rooms to biological sex as well, but were not included in the final bill.

== Reactions ==
=== Support ===
LB 89 was supported by Governor Jim Pillen and the Alliance Defending Freedom.

=== Opposition ===
LB 89 was opposed by the ACLU of Nebraska and faith leaders in a statement released in April 2025.

== See also ==
- LGBTQ rights in Nebraska
