= L. Steven Grasz =

American judge (born 1961)

Steven Grasz
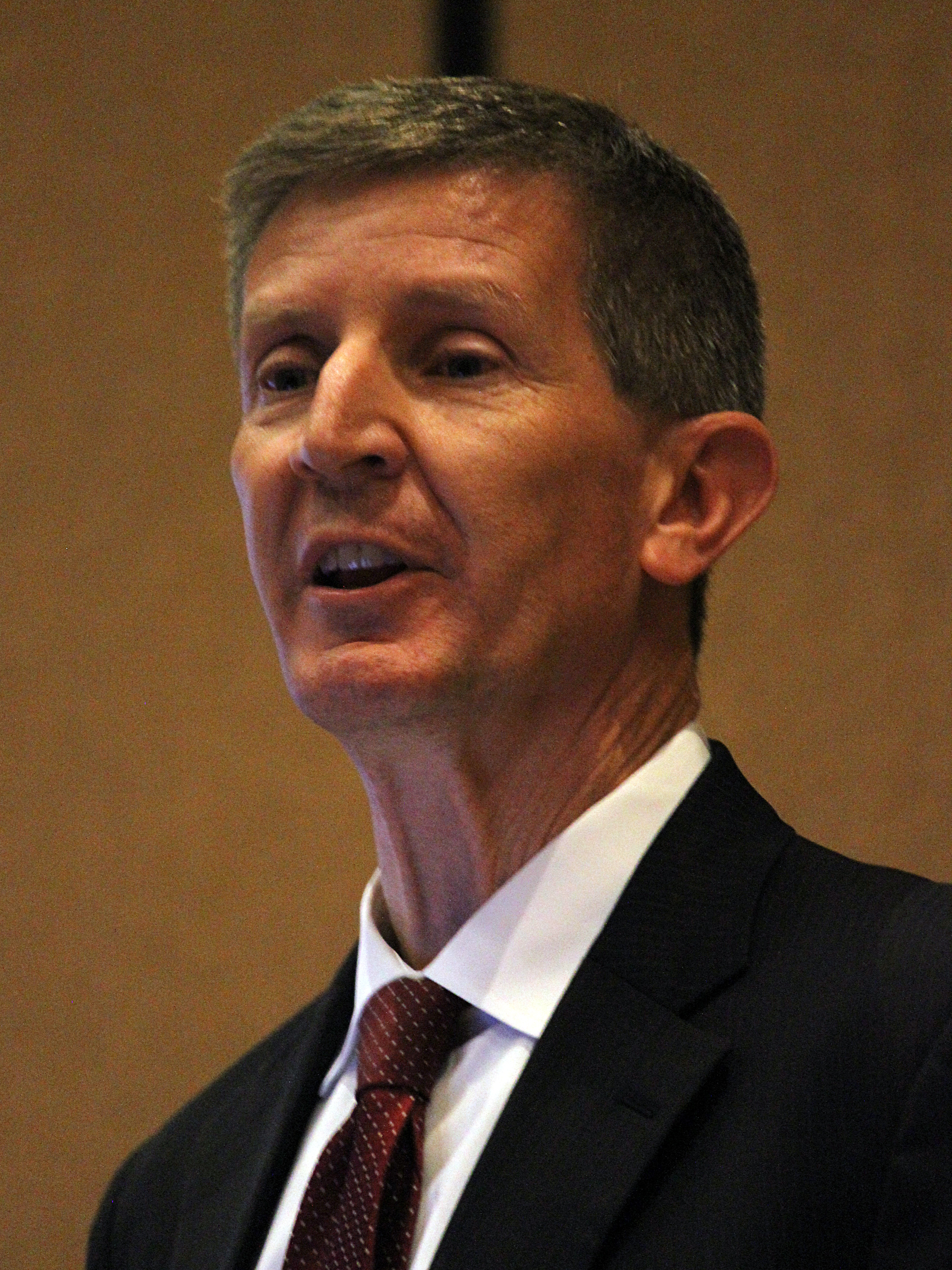

Judge of the United States Court of Appeals for the Eighth Circuit
- Incumbent
- Assumed office January 3, 2018
- Appointed by: Donald Trump
- Preceded by: William J. Riley

Personal details
- Born: Leonard Steven Grasz; November 1, 1961 (age 65) Chappell, Nebraska, U.S.
- Party: Republican
- Education: University of Nebraska–Lincoln (BS, JD)

Leonard Steven Grasz (born November 1, 1961) is an American attorney and jurist serving as a United States circuit judge of the United States Court of Appeals for the Eighth Circuit.

A graduate of the University of Nebraska–Lincoln and the University of Nebraska College of Law, Grasz spent eleven years as the state of Nebraska's Chief Deputy Attorney General. He was a senior partner at the law firm of Husch Blackwell prior to his appointment to the federal judiciary.

At the time of his 2017 nomination for the United States Court of Appeals for the Eighth Circuit, the American Bar Association's Standing Committee on the Federal Judiciary unanimously voted to give Grasz a "not qualified" rating for the position. Grasz was the first circuit court nominee to receive a unanimous "not qualified" rating from the ABA since 2006. Republican Senators accused the ABA of political bias and Grasz, in his testimony, claimed that the ABA's review process was unprofessional.

== Early life and education ==
Grasz was born in Chappell, Nebraska, to farmers. As a child, he showed steers and lambs, belonged to 4-H, and was a state officer for Future Farmers of America. He played basketball and was on the track team in high school, graduating in a class of 33 students.

Grasz received his Bachelor of Science, cum laude, in agriculture from the University of Nebraska–Lincoln in 1984. He received his Juris Doctor degree from the University of Nebraska College of Law in 1989, where he was inducted into the Order of the Coif, served as the executive editor of the Nebraska Law Review, and received the Roscoe Pound Award for his selection as top oral advocate in his class.

== Career ==
=== Early career ===
Grasz began his career as an intern and legislative assistant to Virginia D. Smith, a Republican member of the United States House of Representatives who represented Nebraska's 3rd congressional district from 1975 to 1991 and was the first woman from Nebraska to hold a seat in the U.S. House. Grasz went on to spend two years as an associate at Kutak Rock.

Grasz then spent eleven years as the state of Nebraska's chief deputy attorney general, where he oversaw the Nebraska Attorney General's Office's civil and appellate practice in state and federal courts, the state's official Attorney General's opinions, and the representation of state constitutional officers and legislators. While serving as chief deputy attorney general, Grasz authored nine briefs in the U.S. Supreme Court and served as counsel of record before the Supreme Court in Stenberg v. Carhart (2000), in which he defended a state statute prohibiting partial-birth abortion.

In 2002, Grasz joined the Omaha office of Husch Blackwell. He was named senior partner in 2013. While in private practice, Grasz challenged a state constitutional provision restricting ownership of agricultural land under the Commerce Clause. He worked as a lobbyist in addition to maintaining a legal practice. From 2007 to 2013, he served as general counsel to the Nebraska Republican Party. From 2013 to 2017, he worked as legal counsel, treasurer, and secretary to Pete Ricketts's gubernatorial campaigns.

Grasz has also written numerous op-eds, including one in 2012 criticizing John Roberts as "the one who ushered in the ultimate transfer of limitless power to the federal government" for his decision in National Federation of Independent Business v. Sebelius, which he described as "unsupportable in terms of its legal reasoning and adherence to longstanding rules of constitutional interpretation or construction".

In 2017, Grasz was part of the state chapter of the Federalist Society, joining the Nebraska Lawyers Chapter Steering Committee. He was on the board of the conservative advocacy group Nebraska Family Alliance during the year in which he was nominated by Trump. He served on the board of and as legal counsel to Nebraskans for the Death Penalty.

=== Federal judicial service ===
On August 3, 2017, President Donald Trump nominated Grasz to serve as a United States Circuit Judge of the United States Court of Appeals for the Eighth Circuit, to the seat vacated by Judge William J. Riley, who assumed senior status on June 30, 2017. On November 1, 2017, a hearing on his nomination was held before the Senate Judiciary Committee.

In October 2017, the American Bar Association's Standing Committee on the Federal Judiciary, an entity which rates judicial nominees, unanimously voted to give Grasz a "not qualified" rating for the position. In a statement, the chair of the ABA's standing committee that reviews nominees said that Grasz's "temperament issues, particularly bias and lack of open-mindedness, were problematic". Grasz was the first circuit court nominee to receive a unanimous "not qualified" rating since 2006. Nebraskan Senators Ben Sasse and Deb Fischer defended Grasz's reputation and accused the ABA of conducting a biased evaluation "based on limited facts". Grasz's nomination carried the support of former U.S. Senator and Governor Ben Nelson and former U.S. Attorney for the District of Nebraska Deborah R. Gilg, both Democrats.

On November 15, 2017, Pamela Bresnahan, the chair of the ABA's Standing Committee on the Federal Judiciary, testified before the U.S. Senate in order to explain the organization's vetting of Grasz. In his confirmation hearing, Grasz had testified that the ABA's review process was unprofessional. On November 30, 2017, Senate Judiciary Committee Chairman Chuck Grassley stated that follow-up materials from Grasz "appear to indicate that the ABA relied on faulty information in their evaluation". Upon the request of the Senate Judiciary Committee Ranking Member Dianne Feinstein, the committee vote on Grasz's nomination was delayed for one week.

On December 7, 2017, his nomination was reported out of committee by an 11–9 vote. On December 11, 2017, the United States Senate invoked cloture on his nomination by a 48–47 vote. On December 12, 2017, his nomination was confirmed by a 50–48 vote, with Senators John McCain and Thad Cochran absent. He received his judicial commission on January 3, 2018.

== Notable cases ==
- On November 15, 2021, Grasz, writing for a unanimous panel, denied qualified immunity to a police officer who shot service dogs.
- On December 15, 2022, Grasz authored a unanimous opinion of the Court reversing a lower court jury's veredict that a man who had secretly video recorded his underage niece was guilty of two counts of production of child pornography. Grasz wrote that covertly filming an underage child in a state of undress does not necessarily constitute production of child pornography because "the videos were not intended or designed to elicit a sexual response in the viewer." Grasz's opinion did not suggest what alternative, non-sexual motivation might have existed for the man to have made the secret recordings.
- On December 31, 2025, Grasz, writing for a unanimous panel, reversed a jury award of over $158 million awarded against Amtrak in a wrongful death case involving a passenger who was shot by another passenger. The jury had awarded $8.8 million in compensatory damages and $100 million in punitive damages for Amtrak's conduct. In reversing the jury and district court, Grasz reasoned that the railroad had no duty to protect passengers from criminal acts of other passengers under Missouri law and that the plaintiff had failed to establish causation as a matter of law.

== See also ==
- Donald Trump judicial appointment controversies

Legal offices
Preceded by William J. Riley	Judge of the United States Court of Appeals for the Eighth Circuit; 2018–present	Incumbent
