= Illinois Department of Human Rights =

State agency in Illinois, United States

Department overview
- Jurisdiction: Illinois
- Department executive: Jim Bennett, Director of Human Rights
- Website: dhr.illinois.gov

The Illinois Department of Human Rights (IDHR) is the code department of the Illinois state government that administers the Illinois Human Rights Act, which prohibits discrimination with respect to employment, financial credit, public accommodations and real estate transactions on the basis of race, color, religion, sex (including sexual harassment), national origin, ancestry, military status, age (40 and over), order of protection status, marital status, sexual orientation (which includes gender-related identity), unfavorable military discharge and physical and mental disability, and also prohibits sexual harassment in education, discrimination because of citizenship status and arrest record in employment, and discrimination based on familial status in real estate transactions. As of January 2019, Jim Bennett is the Director of Human Rights.

== See also ==
- List of civil rights agencies in the United States
