= Citizens for Equal Protection v. Bruning =

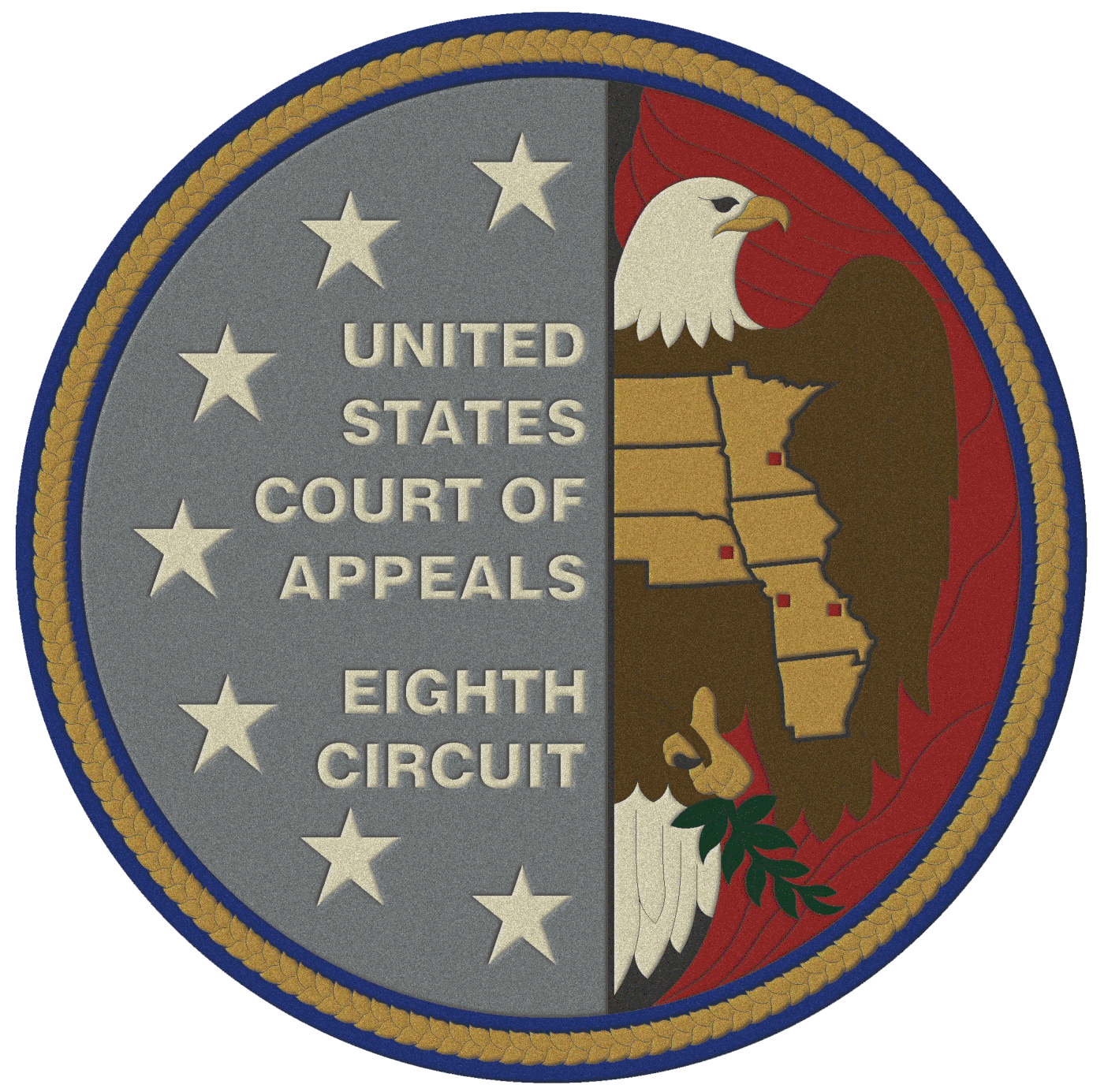
- Court: United States Court of Appeals for the Eighth Circuit
- Full case name: Citizens for Equal Protection et al., v. Jon Bruning, Attorney General of Nebraska et al.
- Decided: July 14, 2006
- Citations: 290 F.Supp.2d 1004 (D.Neb. 2003); 455 F.3d 859 (8th Cir. 2006)

Case history
- Prior actions: Judge Joseph Bataillon, D.Neb., granted judgment for plaintiffs on stipulated trial, struck down Nebraska Initiative Measure 416 as unconstitutional violation of Equal Protection, First Amendment, and bill of attainder

Court membership
- Judges sitting: Chief Judge James B. Loken, Pasco Bowman II, Lavenski Smith

Case opinions

Keywords
- Initiative Measure 416, Marriage, Equal Protection, Same-sex marriage, Sexual Orientation

Citizens for Equal Protection v. Bruning, 455 F.3d 859 (8th Cir. 2006), was a federal lawsuit filed in the United States District Court for the District of Nebraska and decided on appeal by the United States Court of Appeals for the Eighth Circuit. It challenged the federal constitutionality of Nebraska Initiative Measure 416, a 2000 ballot initiative that amended the Nebraska Constitution to prohibit the recognition of same-sex marriages, civil unions, and other same-sex relationships.

On May 12, 2005, United States District Judge Joseph Bataillon ruled that Initiative Measure 416 violated the Equal Protection Clause of the Fourteenth Amendment and was a bill of attainder in violation of the Contract Clause of Article I. Nebraska Attorney General Jon Bruning appealed the decision to the Eighth Circuit in St. Louis, Missouri.

On July 14, 2006, the Eighth Circuit reversed Judge Bataillon's decision. It held that Initiative Measure 416 did not violate the Equal Protection Clause, was not a bill of attainder, and did not violate the First Amendment. The Eighth Circuit held that "laws limiting the state-recognized institution of marriage to heterosexual couples ... do not violate the Constitution of the United States." The plaintiffs did not appeal to the Supreme Court.

Bruning was the only decision of a U.S. Court of Appeals to rule that a state ban on same-sex marriage comports with the U.S. Constitution until the Sixth Circuit did so on November 6, 2014.

== Background ==
In November 2000, Nebraska's voters approved Initiative Measure 416 by 70%, amending the Nebraska Constitution to prohibit the state from recognizing either same-sex marriage or any other same-sex union.

The text of the amendment, which was codified as Article I, section 29, of the Nebraska Constitution, states:

Only marriage between a man and a woman shall be valid or recognized in Nebraska. The uniting of two persons of the same sex in a civil union, domestic partnership, or other similar same-sex relationship shall not be valid or recognized in Nebraska.

In 2003, two LGBT advocacy organizations, Citizens for Equal Protection and the Nebraska Advocates for Justice and Equality, joined by the American Civil Liberties Union and also represented by Lambda Legal, filed suit in the United States District Court for the District of Nebraska challenging the constitutionality of Initiative Measure 416. They named as defendants Nebraska Attorney General Jon Bruning and Governor of Nebraska Mike Johanns. They requested a declaratory judgment declaring that Initiative Measure 416 violates Equal Protection and is a bill of attainder and sought an injunction prohibiting Nebraska from enforcing the measure.

== District court ==
Attorney General Bruning and Governor Johanns initially moved to dismiss the lawsuit, arguing that the plaintiffs lacked standing, the case was not ripe, and the initiative measure could not possibly be construed as a bill of attainder.

On November 10, 2003, Judge Bataillon disagreed, denied the motion, and let the case proceed. Because the case concerned a question of law, rather than a question of fact, the parties entered into a joint stipulation of facts and filed briefs.

Judge Bataillon announced his ruling in favor of the plaintiffs on May 12, 2005, overturning Initiative Measure 416 based on the Equal Protection Clause, the First Amendment, and the prohibition on bills of attainder contained in the Contract Clause. First, although the parties had not raised the issue, Bataillon concluded sua sponte that the measure denied gays and lesbians access to the political system to gain recognition of their relationships without passing a new state constitutional amendment, which he believed unduly burdened their free speech rights, in violation of the First Amendment. Next, relying primarily on the Supreme Court's 1996 decision in Romer v. Evans, he concluded the measure had "no rational relationship to any legitimate state interest," and thus violated the Equal Protection Clause. Finally, he concluded the measure "amounts to punishment" by legislation, as it "does not merely withhold the benefit of marriage; it operates to prohibit persons in a same-sex relationship from working to ever obtain governmental benefits or legal recognition," and thus was a bill of attainder, in violation of the Contract Clause.

== Appeal ==
Attorney General Bruning appealed to the Eighth Circuit Court of Appeals. Amicus curiae briefs were filed in support of Initiative Measure 416 by, among others, the Nebraska Legislature, eleven other states, the Alliance for Marriage, the American Center for Law & Justice, the American Family Association, Focus on the Family, the Family Research Council, Liberty Counsel, the Thomas More Law Center, and 34 law professors. Amicus briefs were filed opposing Initiative Measure 416 by, among others, the National Association of Social Workers, the American Psychological Association, and Parents, Families and Friends of Lesbians and Gays. On February 13, 2006, the Court heard oral argument before Chief Judges James B. Loken, Pasco Bowman II, and Lavenski Smith.

On July 14, 2006, in a unanimous opinion written by Chief Judge Loken, the Court reversed Judge Bataillon's decision on all three of its conclusions.

As to the Equal Protection claim, the Court held that Initiative Measure 416 should receive rational basis review, rather than strict scrutiny, because sexual orientation is not a suspect classification, and thus the classification created by the measure "and other laws defining marriage as the union between one man and one woman is afforded a 'strong presumption of validity.'" Nebraska argued that by "affording legal recognition and a basket of rights and benefits to married heterosexual couples," the initiative measure encouraged "procreation to take place within the socially recognized unit that is best situated for raising children." The Court agreed: "Whatever our personal views regarding this political and sociological debate, we cannot conclude that the State's justification 'lacks a rational relationship to legitimate state interests.'" Thus, the plaintiffs' "equal protection argument fails on the merits."

As to the bill of attainder claim, the Court noted that bills of attainder are "legislative acts, no matter what their form, that apply either to named individuals or to easily ascertainable members of a group in such a way as to inflict punishment on them without a judicial trial." The "bill of attainder concept of punishment ... does not include 'every Act of Congress or the States that legislatively burdens some persons or groups but not all other plausible individuals.'" The harm the plaintiffs claimed "is not punishment in the functional sense because it serves the nonpunitive purpose of steering heterosexual procreation into marriage, a purpose that negates any suspicion that the supporters of [the initiative] were motivated solely by a desire to punish disadvantaged groups." Thus, this claim, too, was "without merit."

As to the First Amendment issue, after criticizing Judge Bataillon for having decided it sua sponte, the Court held that Initiative Measure 416 "does not violate the First Amendment because (i) it 'does not directly and substantially interfere with [the plaintiffs'] ability to associate' in lawful pursuit of a common goal, and (ii) it seems 'exceedingly unlikely' it will prevent persons from continuing to associate."

In its conclusion, the Court cited the Supreme Court's 1972 decision in Baker v. Nelson, noting that when "faced with a Fourteenth Amendment challenge to a decision by the Supreme Court of Minnesota denying a marriage license to a same-sex couple, the United States Supreme Court dismissed 'for want of a substantial federal question.' (Emphasis added.) There is good reason for this restraint." The Court held that Initiative Measure 416 "and other laws limiting the state-recognized institution of marriage to heterosexual couples are rationally related to legitimate state interests and therefore do not violate the Constitution of the United States."

=== Further Appeal to the 8th Circuit ===
The plaintiffs petitioned the Eighth Circuit for rehearing en banc, which the Court denied on August 30, 2006. The plaintiffs did not file a petition for writ of certiorari in the U.S. Supreme Court. One ACLU official commented: "With the current climate in the courts, I think it's a very bad time to attack this problem."

== See also ==
- In Re Marriage of J.B. and H.B. - 2010 Texas case involving some of the same arguments concerning Texas Proposition 2 (2005)
- LGBT rights in Nebraska
