= Nebraska AIDS Project =

U.S. statewide service organization

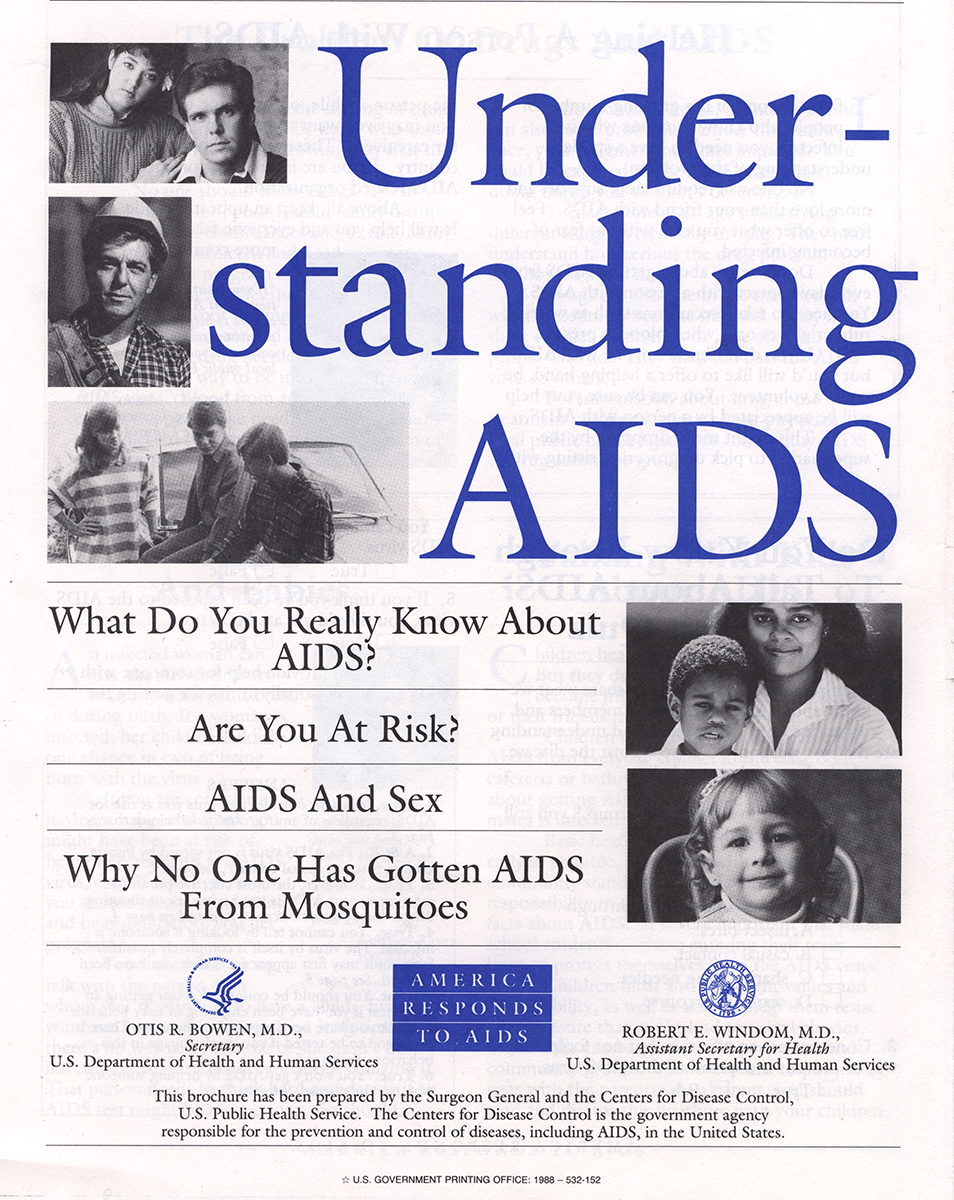
An educational booklet mailed to every American household in 1988

The Nebraska AIDS Project (NAP) is a statewide AIDS Service Organization in Nebraska, which also serves parts of southwestern Iowa and eastern Wyoming. Founded in 1984, NAP is based in Omaha, with satellite offices throughout the state (in Lincoln, Norfolk, Kearney, Scottsbluff and others).

== History ==
=== 1980s ===
The first AIDS case known in Nebraska was an Omaha man who died in 1983. Three cases were identified in 1984, and more were expected. A group of people concerned about the arrival of AIDS and the accompanying panic met in Omaha in 1984. The group established a toll-free hotline that would take questions about AIDS and provide counseling. The volunteers supporting the hotline were organized as the Nebraska AIDS Project in 1985.

In 1988, the Public Health Service mailed an educational booklet about AIDS to every household in America. NAP expanded the hotline's hours and added more phone lines to deal with the increase in Nebraskans' questions about AIDS.

NAP expanded to provide cooking, cleaning, and transportation to HIV-positive clients, and a "Buddies" program offering emotional support. In 1989, NAP director Barbara Shaw lead the expansion to become a statewide organization. Shaw remarked that, in forming local chapters in Nebraska, "one of our biggest challenges will be to help people learn to live with AIDS rather than preparing to die from it."

=== 1990s ===
The number of AIDS cases that NAP served quadrupled in a one-year period from 1989 to 1990. The national AIDS crisis was escalating.

In 1990 NAP received a grant to provide in-home health services to people infected with HIV. NAP provided HIV testing in its own facilities and at gay bars, soup kitchens, and cultural and community centers.

=== 21st century ===
NAP sponsored a condom fashion show in 2013, with clothes made from condoms by local designers.

As of 2019, NAP works with about 500 clients.

== Community support ==
In the early days of NAP, Nebraskans typically perceived AIDS as a problem of distant urban centers and unfamiliar gay subcultures. Still, many Nebraskans volunteered to help NAP.

Tecumseh high school students organized a 10-hour dance marathon fundraiser for NAP in 1987. Students explained that, though there were no cases of AIDS in Tecumseh, they felt moved and frightened by the national crisis.

== Opposition ==
In 1987, NAP and the Nebraska Coalition for Gay and Lesbian Civil Rights mailed a survey to thousands of doctors and dentists in Nebraska, asking if they were willing to treat patients with HIV and gay or lesbian patients. About 10% of respondents said, for a variety of reasons, that they would refuse to treat patients with HIV. Some response forms were "very negative" toward homosexual or HIV-positive patients; one responded by mailing back Evangelical Christian literature. This information was used to create a list of safe medical providers.

In 2000 the city council of Lincoln declined to provide financial support of a NAP AIDS education project. Opposition to the project was led by council member (and future Congressman) Jeff Fortenberry. He objected that the education included condom use, which he found "highly controversial".
