= 2000 Nebraska Initiative 416 =

Referendum to ban same-sex marriage

- November 7, 2000
- Ban Same-Sex Marriage Act; Shall the Nebraska Constitution be amended to provide that only marriage between a man and a woman shall be valid or recognized in Nebraska, and to provide further that the uniting of two persons of the same sex in a civil union, domestic partnership, or other similar same-sex relationship shall not be valid or recognized in Nebraska?

Results
Choice	Votes	%
Yes	477,571	70.10%
No	203,667	29.90%
Valid votes	681,238	96.33%
Invalid or blank votes	25,985	3.67%
Total votes	707,223	100.00%
Registered voters/turnout	1,085,217	62.77%
County results
Yes
90%–100%
80%–90%
70%–80%
60%–70%
50%–60%

Nebraska Initiative 416, officially titled "Ban Same-Sex Marriage Act", was a 2000 ballot initiative that amended the Nebraska Constitution to make it unconstitutional for the state to recognize or perform same-sex marriage, same-sex civil unions, or domestic partnerships. The referendum was approved on November 7, 2000, by 70% of the voters, and it became Article I-29 of the state's Constitution. The initiative has since been struck down in federal court and same-sex marriage is now legally recognized in the state of Nebraska.

As of 2025, Article I-29 of the Nebraska Constitution remains an unconstitutional constitutional amendment. It can repealed by either an initiated constitutional amendment, a state constitutional convention, or by a legislatively referred constitutional amendment that requires a three-fifths vote in the Nebraska Legislature and a majority vote in a referendum.

== Text of amendment ==
The text of the amendment states:

Only marriage between a man and a woman shall be valid or recognized in Nebraska. The uniting of two persons of the same sex in a civil union, domestic partnership, or other similar same-sex relationship shall not be valid or recognized in Nebraska.

Those voting yes were voting in favor of the amendment and those voting no were voting against the amendment.

== Campaign ==
The petition drive that put the proposed amendment on the Nebraska ballot was organized by Guyla Mills, director of Nebraska Family Council. Mills explained her organization's motives, stating: "This is not about hate, this is about love. The Defense of Marriage Act movement was just a platform we had to share the love of Jesus Christ."

A group called the Coalition for Protection of Marriage ran advertisements in support of the marriage ban. The coalition was chaired by former governor Kay Orr and Omaha businessman Bill Ramsey. Dan Parsons of Family First, a Christian-based policy group, served as the coalition spokesman. The LDS Church and Nebraska Catholic Conference were also coalition members.

The proposed amendment was opposed by United Students against 416, a group of University of Nebraska–Lincoln students, and by the Nebraska Coalition for Gay and Lesbian Civil Rights.

== Result ==
Initiative 416
Choice	Votes	%
For	477,571	70.10
Against	203,667	29.90
Total	681,238	100.00
Registered voters/turnout		?

== Lawsuits ==
In 2003, a coalition of gay and lesbian advocacy organizations challenged the constitutionality of Article I, Section 29 of Nebraska's Constitution in Citizens for Equal Protection v. Bruning. In 2005, Judge Joseph Bataillon of the United States District Court for the District of Nebraska ruled in favor of the plaintiffs, declaring that Section 29 was unconstitutional and its enforcement was permanently enjoined. Judge Bataillon determined that this law violated the United States Constitution's Equal Protection Clause, the First Amendment, and the prohibition on bills of attainder found in the Contract Clause. However, in 2006, the United States Court of Appeals for the Eighth Circuit overturned Judge Bataillon's decision using a traditional rational basis review. The Eighth Circuit concluded that "laws limiting the state-recognized institution of marriage to heterosexual couples ... do not violate the Constitution of the United States."

On November 17, 2014, the ACLU filed a lawsuit, Waters et al. v. Heineman, in federal court on behalf of seven same-sex couples seeking to overturn Nebraska's ban on same-sex marriage. The case was renamed Waters v. Ricketts in 2015 when Peter Ricketts succeeded Dave Heineman as Governor. Judge Bataillon of the District Court again presided over the case and ruled once again that the measure violated the U.S. Constitution on the grounds of equal protection and due process. Although the state appealed and successfully obtained a stay of the ruling from the Eighth Circuit Court of Appeals, the United States Supreme Court ultimately struck down same-sex marriage bans nationwide based on identical grounds in the matter of Obergefell v. Hodges. With this Supreme Court decision, the Eighth Circuit Court lifted the stay of Judge Bataillon's ruling, officially negating Initiative 416. As a result, Nebraska officials and agencies are formally prohibited from enforcing the ban on same-sex marriage in the state.

== Status ==
In February 2016, Judge Bataillon issued a permanent injunction that overturned the state's now-defunct ban on same-sex marriage. The ruling mandated that state officials regard same-sex couples equally to opposite-sex couples in all matters, including the processing of marriage licenses and the issuance of birth certificates.

Following Obergefell v. Hodges the text of Initiative 416 is dead letter and is not enforced. It remains a part of the constitution.

The Nebraska Family Alliance and Nebraska Catholic Conference continue to oppose efforts to remove the text of Initiative 416 from the Constitution following the court rulings. In 2019, Governor Pete Ricketts vetoed a bill that would require marriage applications, licenses and certificates to refer to a married couple as “Applicant 1" and “Applicant 2.”

== See also ==
- Same-sex marriage in Nebraska
- LGBT rights in Nebraska
- U.S. state constitutional amendments banning same-sex unions
