= Minnesota Department of Human Rights =

The Minnesota Department of Human Rights is a state-level governmental body in Minnesota tasked with investigating abuses of its human rights laws and educating the public about them.

== History ==
Prior to the establishment of the Minnesota Department of Human Rights, the Minnesota Legislature created the State Commission Against Discrimination in 1955. Its role was to protect the rights of Minnesota residents, and to provide necessary services for them. This was in response to the amendment that the Legislature made to the fair employment practices act to include a housing provision.

The Minnesota Department of Human Rights was founded in 1967, to succeed the State Commission Against Discrimination. This is because new federal civil rights laws were being passed in the United States, and the state of Minnesota wished to have an official body to handle violation of these civil rights laws. In 1973, Minnesota passed the Minnesota Human Rights Act, which the Department of Human Rights would enforce. That act, with subsequent renumbering and amendments, is codified as Chapter 363A of Minnesota Statutes.

== Minnesota Human Rights Act ==
Minnesota has more comprehensive anti-discrimination legislation than the federal government. The Minnesota Human Rights Act identifies thirteen "protected classes": race, color, creed, religion, national origin, sex, marital status, familial status, disability, public assistance, age, sexual orientation, and local human rights activity. It is illegal in the state of Minnesota to discriminate against these thirteen protected classes in business, credit, education, employment, housing, public accommodations, and public services.

== Role of the Minnesota Department of Human Rights ==
The Minnesota Department of Human Rights educates people within the state of Minnesota about the Human Rights Act, and encourages those who have experienced discrimination—or who believe that they have experienced discrimination—to file complaints with their human rights investigators. While their main office is located in Saint Paul, due to high demand the Minnesota Department of Human Rights also has a human rights investigator in St. Cloud.

== Organization ==
A commissioner and deputy commissioner oversee a communications team, a legal team, and a pool of investigators. The commissioner must have a law degree and experience in civil rights legislation.

== Local Minnesota Human Rights Commissions ==
Nearly fifty towns and cities in Minnesota have local human rights commissions composed of any combination of volunteers, city council representatives, clergy, or other local authority figure. Several of these human rights commissions work with a human rights investigator hired by the Minnesota Department of Human Rights in St. Paul but assigned to work in that town or city.

== See also ==
- List of civil rights agencies in the United States
