= Nebraska Equal Opportunity Commission =

U.S. state administrative agency

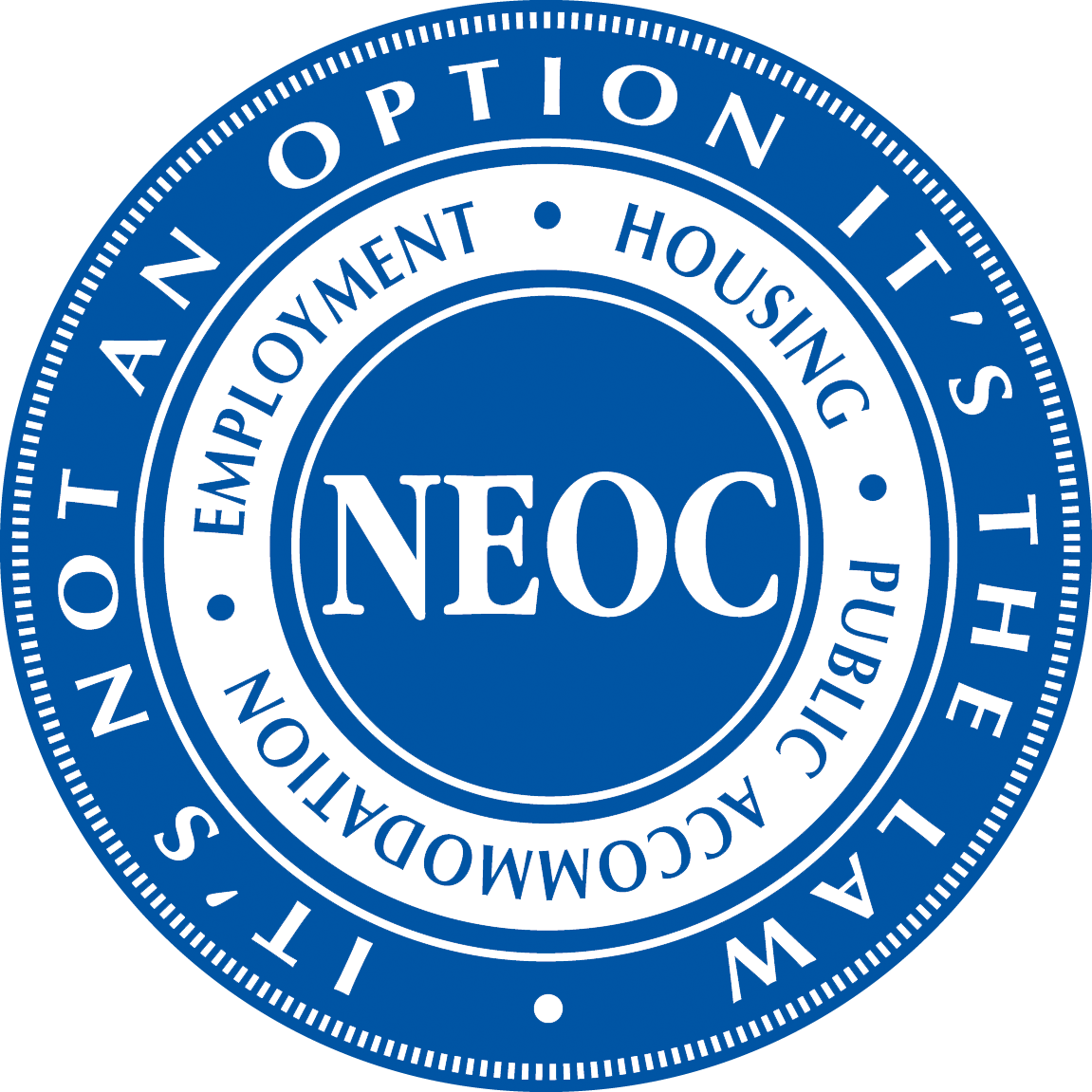
- Type: Civil Rights Agency
- Headquarters: Centennial Government Building
- Location: Lincoln, Nebraska
- Chairperson: Patrick Borchers
- Executive Director: Paula Gardner
- Website: https://neoc.nebraska.gov

The Nebraska Equal Opportunity Commission is the state administrative agency that investigates and enforces Nebraska civil rights laws. The commission consists of seven members appointed by the Governor and an executive director. The commission receives, investigates and makes decisions on civil rights complaints that allege unlawful discrimination in housing, employment and public accommodations practices within the state. The NEOC maintains offices in Lincoln, Omaha, and Scottsbluff.

== Commissioners ==
=== Executive director ===
- Paula Gardner

=== Current commissioners ===
- Patrick Borchers - Chairperson
- John Arnold - Vice-chairperson
- Royce Jeffries - Commissioner
- Eric Drumheller - Commissioner
- Arla Jo Meyer - Commissioner
- Tyeisha Kosmicki - Commissioner
- Lynn Brennan - Commissioner

The current Executive Director (Paula Gardner) accepted the position in February 2022 after acting as the Interim Executive Director since September 2021 when the previous Executive Director (Marna Munn) resigned. Gardner previously held the position of Unit Director of Conciliation before her promotion. Chairperson Borchers is a Law Professor at Creighton University. Commissioners Royce Jeffries, John Arnold and Eric Drumheller are current or former business executives. Commissioners Arla Jo Meyer, Lynn Brennan and Tyeisha Kosmicki are Realtors.

== NEOC Historical Background ==
The Nebraska Equal Opportunity Commission (NEOC) was established by statute in 1965 as a response to the Civil Rights Movement. The unicameral legislature sought to implement its own state laws to complement the recent passage of the Civil Rights Act of 1964. The NEOC was originally authorized to enforce the Nebraska Fair Employment Practice Act (FEPA), which prohibited discrimination in employment. Their enforcement authority has been expanded several times, including coverage of the Nebraska Equal Pay Act in 1967 (Equal Pay in Employment), the Nebraska Civil Rights Act in 1969 (Public Accommodations), the Age Discrimination in Employment Act in 1972, and the Nebraska Fair Housing Act in 1991.

The NEOC receives annual funding from the United States Department of Housing and Urban Development as a Fair Housing Assistance Program (FHAP) agency, which authorizes the agency to investigate complaints that additionally allege violations of federal civil rights laws, including Title VII of the Title VII of the Civil Rights Act, Title I of the Americans with Disabilities Act, and the Federal Fair Housing Act.

== Criticism ==
The commission has been criticized for being slow to process civil rights charges, with a 7+ month delay reported for cases being assigned to investigators and upwards of a year for resolutions. Between 2014 and 2019, the NEOC's reported percentage of determinations with positive results (either reasonable cause found or a successful settlement) went from 17.8% (of 200 cases) to 11.8% (of 106 cases), while the average hours worked on each case went from 11.68 to 15.67 and the average days spent went from 80.6 to 150.9. Looking at only the cases with a Cause/No Cause decision from the Commission, the days passed before the case was assigned to an investigator went from 95 to 191, the days passed before a decision was made went from 194 to 342, and the percentage of these cases where the Commission determined they had 'reasonable cause' that discrimination occurred went from 5% to 2%.

=== 2018–2019 Civil rights enforcement outcomes ===
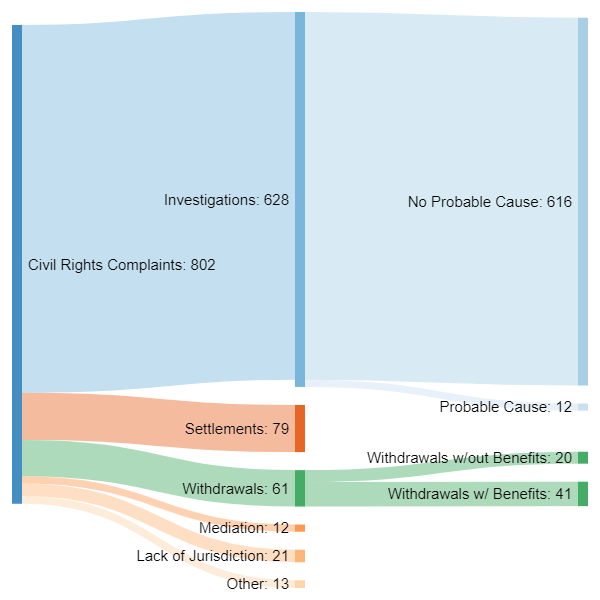

=== Discrimination against Latinos ===
In 2020, the NEOC was sued for failing to hire Latinos. According to a failed lawsuit in the District Court of Lancaster County, the executive director of the commission was accused not hiring a highly qualified Latino as a civil rights investigator in 2018. Since that time, the commission has worked to become more inclusive. Between 2018 and 2019, the NEOC ran several ads in the Omaha area with La Nueva Radio, to improve outreach to the Hispanic community.

=== Lawsuits ===
In 1997, the NEOC was sued for allegedly wrongfully firing two of its investigators for whistleblowing in State ex rel. Shepherd v. NEOC. The Nebraska Supreme Court reversed the favorable district court decision on constitutional grounds (separation of powers). In 1998, the former executive director of the NEOC was found to have fathered children with staff at the commission. The alleged perpetrator later sued the NEOC after the State of Nebraska sought to remove him from the Commission. In 1999, two former investigators sued the commission, alleging they were fired in violation of the Americans with Disabilities Act (ADA). The jury in the district court case found in their favor and awarded over $275,000 to the Plaintiffs, however the Federal Court of Appeals reversed the decision, ruling that the ADA did not remove the State's Eleventh Amendment rights.

== See also ==
- List of civil rights agencies in the United States
