= Nebraska Family Alliance =

U.S. nonprofit organization

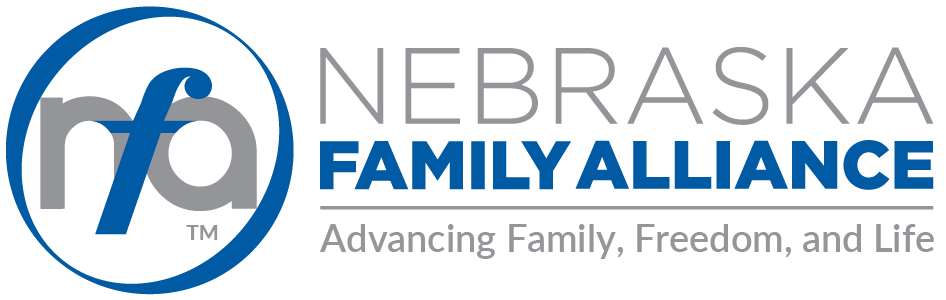
- Established: 1988
- Mission: Advancing Family, Freedom, and Life
- Focus: Influencing Policy, Mobilizing Prayer, and Empowering People
- President: Jay Huston
- Budget: Revenue: $483,489; Expenses: $343,478 (FYE 2019)
- Address: 1106 E St, Lincoln, NE 68508
- Location: Nebraska
- Website: nebraskafamilyalliance.org

The Nebraska Family Alliance (NFA) is a fundamentalist Christian 501(c)(3) organization based in Lincoln, Nebraska. It most prominently lobbies against LGBT rights, such as same-sex marriage and LGBT adoption. The NFA also seeks legal restrictions on abortion, and to change public policy on gambling and human trafficking. It advocates for traditional family structures and gender roles.

As a family policy council, the NFA is a state-level affiliate of Focus on the Family.

== Organization ==
Nebraska Family Alliance was founded in 1988 as Nebraska Family Council. Its name changed to the current one when it merged with Family First, another Nebraska-based conservative organization, in 2013.

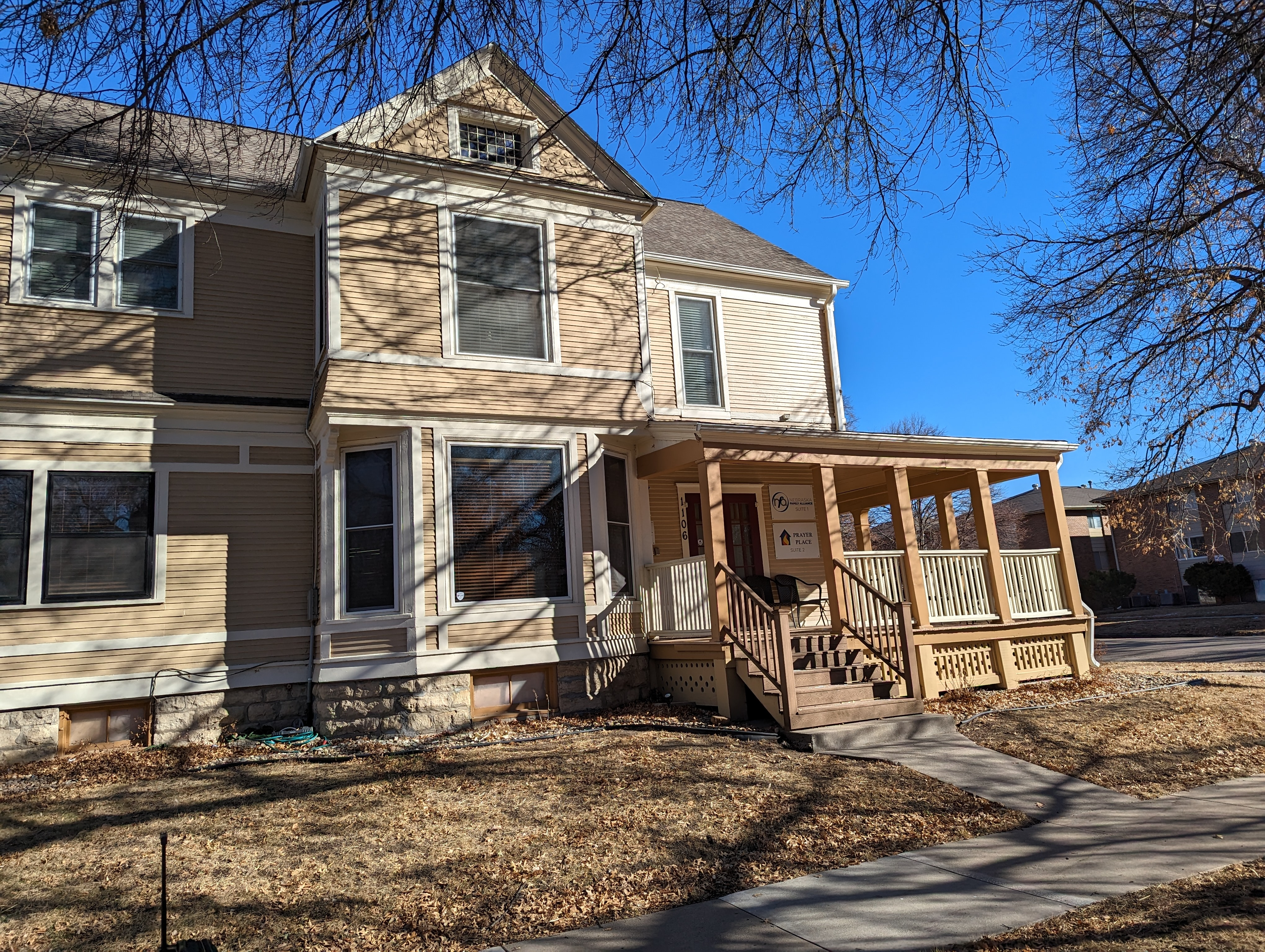
Nebraska Family Alliance headquarters in Lincoln

NFA is a family policy council and aligned with Alliance Defending Freedom, Focus on the Family, and Family Policy Alliance. Like its allies, the NFA advocates for conservative social goals that it calls "family values."

In a review of former Nebraska attorney general Don Stenberg's book Eavesdropping on Lucifer, NFA's executive director encouraged readers to "[overcome] forces of evil" in order to ensure "families thrive, life is cherished and religious freedom flourishes."

== Policy efforts ==
=== Protecting women’s sports ===
In 2025, the Nebraska Family Alliance supported LB89, the “Stand With Women Act”, which required students in K-12 and postsecondary school participate on sports teams that correspond to their biological sex. The bill passed the Nebraska legislature with a vote of 33–16 and Governor Jim Pillen signed the bill into law in June 2025.

=== Online age verification for adult websites ===
In 2024, representatives of the Nebraska Family Alliance supported LB1092, the “Online Age Verification Liability Act”, which was designed to protect underage minors from easy access to online pornography by requiring that commercial websites use an age verification method, ensuring that anyone attempting to access such material is at least 18 years old.

LB1092 passed with a vote of 35–3 and was signed into law in 2024.

=== Parental rights in social media ===
The Nebraska Family Alliance backed LB 383, the “Parental Rights in Social Media Act”, which requires age verification and parental consent before minors can open social media accounts. It was signed into law by Governor Jim Pillen later that month.

LB 383 was also amended to include LB 172, another NFA-supported bill, to prohibit AI-generated child pornography.

=== Banning gender reassignment surgery for Minors ===
The Nebraska Family Allisnce backed LB574, the “Let Them Grow Act”, which included regulation of puberty blockers for minors and a ban on gender-altering surgeries for minors. Governor Jim Pillen signed the bill into law on May 23, 2023.

=== Opposition of Online Sports Betting ===
In 2026, Nebraska Family Alliance led an opposition campaign called “Save Nebraska Sports” to fight the legalization of online sports betting in Nebraska (Initiative 440 and 441).

The campaign gained support from State Auditor Mike Flood who disputed the amount of property tax relief the gambling industry claimed it would bring. The campaign was also backed by former Nebraska Coach Tom Osborne and 40 current and former Husker players over concerns about exposing student-athletes to harassment and threats from gamblers over lost bets.

Voters rejected both ballot Initiatives.

=== Adoption Tax Credit ===
Nebraska Family Alliance supported LB709; a refundable state tax credit equal to ten percent of the federal tax credit for any taxpayer who is eligible for the federal adoption expenses tax credit. The bill was amended into LB 647 and advanced with a 35-13 vote and was signed into law by Governor Pillen on May 30th.

=== Marriage and divorce ===
In its early days, the NFA was focused on opposition to divorce. They supported "making divorces harder to get by increasing the waiting period for them to become final" and other efforts against no-fault divorce.

The organization led the successful 2000 ballot initiative that amended the Nebraska Constitution to prohibit same-sex marriage. Guyla Mills, organizer of the ballot initiate petition drive and NFA Executive Director, explained her organization's motivation at a January 2001 victory celebration. "We are not hate mongers," she said, addressing protesters on the street outside the celebration venue. "This is not about hate, this is about love. The Defense of Marriage Act movement was just a platform we had to share the love of Jesus Christ."

In 2001, NFA opposed gay marriage, calling it a part of the "homosexual agenda"

=== Intelligent design ===
NFA advocates for intelligent design, a pseudoscientific explanation of biology, to be included as curriculum in Nebraska schools.

=== Adoption ===
From 2000 to 2002, lawyers for the organization fought a court battle against a lesbian couple who were attempting to adopt a child. NFC lawyers won the case, In re Adoption of Luke, in the Nebraska Supreme Court. This set precedent prohibiting gay and unmarried adoption throughout the state.

In 2007, the Nebraska Legislature considered a bill that would allow gay couples to adopt. Executive Director Dave Bydalek testified against the bill, saying "kids are better off with loving parents of both sexes." The measure failed; adoption by same-sex couples was prohibited in Nebraska until 2017.

=== Domestic assault ===
The organization opposed a 2004 attempt to modernize Nebraska domestic assault law to use the phrase "intimate partner" to include unmarried And same-sex couples.

Al Riskowski of the Nebraska Family Council said, “We are very much in favor of helping families caught up in the cycle of violence we want to uphold and strengthen marriage. But legally recognizing two people living together is recognizing an immoral situation. That is not upholding the family."

=== Human trafficking ===
The NFA has worked to raise awareness about human trafficking and supported the first anti-trafficking law in 2006 that made human-trafficking illegal under Nebraska law. In 2019, the NFA supported legislation granting law enforcement the authority to utilize wire-taps in trafficking investigations and to expand the statute of limitations for prosecuting trafficking crimes. In 2017, the NFA advocated for a law increasing criminal penalties for trafficking offenses for both traffickers and buyers.

=== LGBT protections ===
In 2012, shortly before their merger, Family First and the Nebraska Family Council jointly led a successful petition drive against an attempt to ban LGBT employment, housing and public accommodations discrimination in Lincoln. Firing an employee, evicting a renter, and ejecting a customer from a business for reason of sexual orientation remained legal in Lincoln until Bostock v. Clayton County prohibited employment discrimination in 2020.

The NFA lobbied in opposition to a series of LGBT anti-discrimination bills in the Nebraska legislature from 2015 to 2019.

The NFA opposed a Lincoln ordinance extending employment and workplace protections to include sexual orientation, gender identity, and active military or veteran status. They collected 18,000 signatures in opposition to it in 2022.

=== Gambling ===
The NFA opposes state-sponsored gambling and in 2016 helped defeat a ballot initiative attempting to legalize casino gambling.

=== Fetal alcohol syndrome ===
The NFA also raised awareness about fetal alcohol spectrum disorder and the alcohol-related issues plaguing the Pine Ridge Indian Reservation stemming from the sale of alcohol in the unincorporated village of Whiteclay, Nebraska.

=== Abortion ===
They identify as a pro-life organization and support restrictions on abortion. In 2019, the NFA advocated for a law requiring abortion providers to inform women seeking a medication abortion about the possibility of continuing their pregnancy after beginning a medication abortion. Such legislation has drawn criticism from professional medical associations. The American College of Obstetricians and Gynecologists issued a fact sheet stating "claims regarding abortion 'reversal' treatment are not based on science and do not meet clinical standards."

=== Conversion therapy ===
The NFA hosts ex-gay speakers at its events. Michael Johnston, who helps people “leave the homosexual lifestyle”, gave the keynote at the Day of Family in 2000.

In 2019, the NFA testified before the Nebraska Legislature in support of keeping conversion therapy legal in Nebraska. NFA cited the bill's broad definition of conversion therapy that would criminalize basic talk therapy in order to outlaw helping someone move away from unwanted same-sex attraction or gender confusion.

.

=== Religious freedom ===
The NFA's website says religious freedom is “our most foundational freedom” and "committed to protecting the right of every Nebraskan to believe, share, and live out their faith—publicly and privately.” To highlight its advocacy for religious freedom, NFA invited Jack Phillips and Barronelle Stutzman to speak at a 2018 fundraiser. Both speakers had been involved in high-profile legal cases after declining to provide wedding services for same-sex couples based on their religious convictions.

The NFA also hosts an annual National Day of Prayer event and promotes proclamations recognizing Religious Freedom Day in Nebraska.

== Notable people ==
- Russ Gronewold, CEO of Bryan Health, former NFA board member.
- L. Steven Grasz, a federal judge appointed by Donald Trump in 2017, former NFA board member who resigned from the board in 2017.
