= James B. Loken =

American federal judge (born 1940)

James Loken
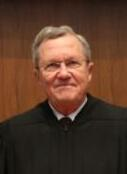
- Loken in 2012

Chief Judge of the United States Court of Appeals for the Eighth Circuit
- In office April 1, 2003 – March 31, 2010
- Preceded by: David R. Hansen
- Succeeded by: William J. Riley

Judge of the United States Court of Appeals for the Eighth Circuit
- Incumbent
- Assumed office October 17, 1990
- Appointed by: George H. W. Bush
- Preceded by: Gerald Heaney

Personal details
- Born: James Burton Loken; May 21, 1940 (age 86) Madison, Wisconsin, U.S.
- Spouse: Caroline Loken
- Education: University of Wisconsin, Madison (BS); Harvard University (LLB)

James Burton Loken (born May 21, 1940) is an American lawyer and jurist serving as a United States circuit judge of the U.S. Court of Appeals for the Eighth Circuit. He was appointed in 1990 by President George H. W. Bush, and served as the Eighth Circuit's chief judge from 2003 to 2010.

== Early life and education ==
Loken earned his Bachelor of Science degree from the University of Wisconsin–Madison in 1962 and his Juris Doctor from Harvard Law School in 1965. After law school, he clerked for Judge J. Edward Lumbard of the United States Court of Appeals for the Second Circuit from 1965 to 1966 and for Justice Byron White of the United States Supreme Court from 1966 to 1967. He is married to Caroline Loken.

== Professional career ==
Loken was in private practice in Minneapolis, Minnesota, from 1967 to 1970. He was General Counsel to the President's Committee on Consumer Interests in 1970 and a staff assistant to President Richard M. Nixon from 1970 to 1972. Loken returned to private practice in Minneapolis from 1973 to 1990 at the white shoe law firm of Faegre & Benson.

== Federal judicial service ==
On September 10, 1990, President George H. W. Bush nominated Loken to the United States Court of Appeals for the Eighth Circuit seat vacated by Gerald William Heaney. He was confirmed by the United States Senate on October 12 and received his commission on October 17. Future Dean of Brooklyn Law School Michael T. Cahill served as his law clerk from 1999 to 2000.

Loken served as chief judge of the court from April 1, 2003, to March 31, 2010, when he was succeeded by William J. Riley. He has been the oldest Eighth Circuit judge who still occupies their seat (meaning not in senior status) since December 14, 2018, when Roger Leland Wollman went senior.

=== Notable cases ===
- In July 2017, Loken wrote for the en banc Eighth Circuit when it found, by a vote of 7–2, that the National Labor Relations Act did not protect Jimmy John's employees from being fired for putting up Industrial Workers of the World posters seeking sick leave.
- In November 2022, Loken wrote for a three-judge panel upholding an immigration judge's finding that an asylum applicant who had allegedly been brutally raped by military officers in her home country, Cameroon, was not credible because she did not provide medical records from the government hospital that attended to her injuries.

== See also ==
- List of law clerks for the sixth seat of the Supreme Court of the United States
- List of United States federal judges by longevity of service

Legal offices
Preceded by Gerald Heaney	Judge of the United States Court of Appeals for the Eighth Circuit; 1990–present	Incumbent
Preceded by David R. Hansen	Chief Judge of the United States Court of Appeals for the Eighth Circuit; 2003–2010	Succeeded by William J. Riley
