= Ricci v. DeStefano =

- Supreme Court of the United States

Argued April 22, 2009 Decided June 29, 2009
- Full case name: Frank Ricci, et al. v. John DeStefano, et al.
- Docket nos.: 07-1428; 08-328
- Citations: 557 U.S. 557 (more) 129 S. Ct. 2658; 174 L. Ed. 2d 490

Case history
- Prior: Summary judgment for defendants, 554 F. Supp. 2d 142 (D. Conn. 2006), aff'd, 264 F. App'x 106 (2d Cir. 2008), summary order withdrawn, aff'd, 530 F.3d 87 (2d Cir. 2008), rehearing en banc denied, 530 F.3d 88 (2d Cir. 2008), cert. granted, 555 U.S. 1091 (2009).

Holding
- Before an employer can engage in intentional discrimination for the asserted purpose of avoiding or remedying an unintentional, disparate impact, the employer must have a strong basis in evidence to believe that it will be subject to disparate-impact liability if it fails to take the race-conscious, discriminatory action. Because New Haven failed to demonstrate such strong basis in evidence, its action in discarding the tests violated Title VII.

Court membership
- Chief Justice John Roberts Associate Justices John P. Stevens · Antonin Scalia; Anthony Kennedy · Clarence Thomas; Ruth Bader Ginsburg · Stephen Breyer; Samuel Alito

Case opinions
- Majority: Kennedy, joined by Roberts, Scalia, Thomas, Alito
- Concurrence: Scalia
- Concurrence: Alito, joined by Scalia, Thomas
- Dissent: Ginsburg, joined by Stevens, Souter, Breyer

Laws applied
- Title VII of the Civil Rights Act of 1964, 42 U.S.C. § 2000e et seq.

Ricci v. DeStefano, 557 U.S. 557 (2009), is a United States labor law case of the United States Supreme Court on unlawful discrimination through disparate impact under the Civil Rights Act of 1964.

Twenty city firefighters at the New Haven Fire Department, nineteen white and one Hispanic, passed the test for promotion to a management position, yet the city declined to promote them because none of the black firefighters who took the same test scored high enough to be considered for promotion. New Haven officials invalidated the test results because they feared a lawsuit over the test's disproportionate exclusion of a certain racial group (blacks) from promotion under a disparate impact cause of action. The twenty non-black firefighters claimed discrimination under Title VII of the Civil Rights Act of 1964.

The Supreme Court held 5–4 that New Haven's decision to ignore the test results violated Title VII because the city did not have a "strong basis in evidence" that it would have subjected itself to disparate impact liability if it had promoted the white and Hispanic firefighters instead of the black firefighters. Because the plaintiffs won under their Title VII claim, the Court did not consider the plaintiffs' argument that New Haven violated the constitutional right to equal protection.

== Facts ==
In late 2003, the New Haven Fire Department had seven openings for captain and eight openings for lieutenant. To fill the open positions, it needed to administer civil service examinations. The examinations consisted of two parts: a written examination and an oral examination.

The examinations were governed in part by the City of New Haven's contract with the firefighters' union (which stated that the written exam result counted for 60% of an applicant's score and the oral exam for 40%, and that a total score above 70% on the exam would constitute a passing score). The final selection would be governed by a provision in the City Charter referred to as the "Rule of Three", which mandated that a civil service position be filled from among the three individuals with the highest scores on the exam.

=== Examinations ===
The New Haven Department of Human Resources issued an RFP for these examinations, as a result of which I/O Solutions ("IOS") designed the examinations. The examinations were administered in November and December 2003; 118 firefighters took the examinations (77 took the lieutenant exam and 41 took the captain exam).

When the results came back, the pass rate for black candidates was approximately half that of the corresponding rate for white candidates:

- The pass rate for the captain exam was: 16 (64%) of the 25 whites; 3 (38%) of the 8 blacks; and 3 (38%) of the 8 Hispanics. Under the city charter's "Rule of Three", the top 9 scorers would be eligible for promotion to the 7 open captain positions. The top 9 scorers consisted of 7 whites, 2 Hispanics, and no blacks.
- The pass rate for the lieutenant exam was: 25 (58%) of the 43 whites; 6 (32%) of the 19 blacks; 3 (20%) of the 15 Hispanics. Under the city charter's "Rule of Three", the top 10 scorers would be eligible for promotion to the 8 open lieutenant positions. The top 10 scorers were all white.

=== Parties ===
Ricci and eighteen other white test takers, plus one Hispanic, all of whom would have qualified for consideration for the promotions, sued the city including Mayor John DeStefano Jr. The lead plaintiff was Frank Ricci, a decorated firefighter who had served at the New Haven station for 11 years. Ricci gave up a second job to make time to study for the test. Because he has dyslexia, he paid an acquaintance $1,000 to read his textbooks onto audiotapes. Ricci also made flashcards, took practice tests, worked with a study group, and participated in mock interviews. He placed 6th among 77 people who took the lieutenant's test; thus, under the "Rule of Three", Ricci would have been eligible for promotion.

Lt. Ben Vargas, the lone Hispanic petitioner, was ridiculed as an "Uncle Tom", a "turncoat", and a "token". After speaking with black co-workers in Humphrey's East Restaurant in 2004, he was assaulted from behind in the bathroom, knocked unconscious, and hospitalized. He alleged the attack was orchestrated by a black firefighter in retribution for filing the legal case, but the co-worker in question strongly denied the charge. Vargas quit the Hispanic firefighters' association, whose members include his brother, after the group declined to support his legal case.

In addition to Ricci and Vargas, other firefighters were equally involved and were named plaintiffs: Steven Durand, Greg Boivin, Mark Vendetto, John Vendetto, Kevin Roxbee, James Kottage, Matthew Marcarelli, Edward Riordan, Sean Patten, Brian Jooss, Michael Christoforo, Timothy Scanlon, Ryan DiVito, Christopher Parker, Michael Blatchley, William Gambardella, Thomas Michaels, and Gary Carbone. The press dubbed the group the 'New Haven 20.'

=== Claims ===
Among other things, the suit alleged that, by discarding the test results, the City and the named officials discriminated against the plaintiffs based on their race, in violation of both Title VII of the Civil Rights Act of 1964, 78 Stat. 253, as amended, 42 U. S. C. §2000e et seq., and the Equal Protection Clause of the Fourteenth Amendment to the United States Constitution. The City and the officials defended their actions, arguing that if they had certified the results, they could have faced liability under Title VII for adopting a practice that had a disparate impact on the minority firefighters.

== Judgment ==
=== District Court ===
Judge Janet Bond Arterton in the federal district court ruled for the city, granting its motion for summary judgment.

=== Second Circuit ===
On appeal, a three-judge panel of the Second Circuit Court of Appeals (Pooler, Sack and Sotomayor, C.JJ.) heard arguments in this case of discrimination. Judge Sotomayor (who was subsequently elevated to Associate Justice to the U.S. Supreme Court) vigorously questioned the attorneys in the case, and repeatedly discussed whether the city had a right to attempt to reformulate its test if it was afraid that the original test was discriminatory or that it would result in litigation. The three-judge panel affirmed the district court's ruling in a summary order, without opinion, on February 15, 2008.

After a judge on the Second Circuit requested that the court hear the case en banc, however, the panel withdrew its summary order. On June 9, 2008 it issued instead a unanimous per curiam opinion. The panel's June 9, 2008 per curiam opinion was eight sentences long. It characterized the trial court's decision as "thorough, thoughtful and well-reasoned" while also lamenting that there were "no good alternatives" in the case. The panel expressed sympathy with the plaintiffs' situation, particularly Ricci's, but ultimately concluded that the Civil Service Board was acting to "fulfill its obligations under Title VII [of the Civil Rights Act]." The panel concluded by adopting the trial court's opinion in its entirety.

A petition for a rehearing en banc was denied on June 12, 2008 by a vote of 7–6. Judge José Cabranes and Chief Judge Dennis Jacobs wrote opinions in dissent from the denial of rehearing, urging review by the Supreme Court.

The Supreme Court granted certiorari and heard oral arguments on April 22, 2009.

=== Supreme Court ===
The Court held the city of New Haven violated the Title VII of the Civil Rights Act of 1964 by discarding the test scores. It said the city failed to establish any "genuine dispute that the examinations were job-related and consistent with business necessity." In the majority's view, the employer should have "demonstrate[d] a strong basis in evidence that, had it not taken the action, it would have been liable under the disparate-impact statute."

The Supreme Court upheld the fairness and validity of the examinations that IOS developed and administered. IOS is an Illinois company that specializes in designing entry-level examinations and promotional examinations for fire and police departments; and other public safety and corporate organizations. The Court cited examples of how the IOS test design, criteria, and methodology included: interviews, observations, education, test format compliance, and independent assessors. With that information, IOS produced a test that reduced adverse impact to the protected class.

Supreme Court Justice Anthony Kennedy wrote, "In order to fit the examinations to the New Haven Department, IOS began the test-design process by performing job analyses to identify the tasks, knowledge, skills, and abilities that are essential for the lieutenant and captain positions."

The process that IOS used to design their test for the job analyses portion included interviews of incumbent captains and lieutenants and their supervisors, and ride-along observations of other on-duty officers. Using that information, IOS wrote job-analysis questionnaires and administered them to most of the incumbent battalion chiefs, captains, and lieutenants in the Department. "

Kennedy continued, "At every stage of the job analysis, IOS, by deliberate choice, over-sampled minority firefighters to ensure that the results which IOS would use to develop the examinations—would not intentionally favor white candidates."

Kennedy included in the Opinion the following procedures IOS used to develop the written examinations to measure the candidates' job-related knowledge. "IOS compiled a list of training manuals, Department procedures, and other materials to use as sources for the test questions and received approval from the New Haven fire chief and assistant fire chief. Then, using the approved sources, IOS drafted a 100 question multiple-choice test written below a 10th-grade reading level. The City then opened a 3-month study period in which it gave candidates a list that identified the source material (or references list) for the questions, including the specific chapters from which the questions were taken."

IOS also developed the oral examinations that concentrated on job skills and abilities. Using the job-analysis information, IOS wrote hypothetical situations to test incident-command skills, firefighting tactics, interpersonal skills, leadership, and management ability, among other things. Candidates were then asked these hypotheticals and had to respond to a panel of three assessors.

The Court agreed that IOS demonstrated due diligence by, "assembling a pool of 30 assessors who were superior in rank to the positions being tested. At the City's insistence (because of controversy surrounding previous examinations), all the assessors came from outside Connecticut. "IOS submitted the assessors' resumes to City officials for approval. They were battalion chiefs, assistant chiefs, and fire chiefs from departments of similar sizes to New Haven's throughout the country. Sixty-six percent of the panelists were minorities, and each of the nine three-member assessment panels contained two minority members. They received training on how to score the candidates' responses consistently using checklists of desired criteria.

Section II-A reiterated the doctrines underlying a disparate-treatment claim.

First, Kennedy rejected arguments that the City did not discriminate. It engaged in "express, race-based decisionmaking" (i.e., disparate treatment/intentional discrimination) when it declined to certify the examination results because of the statistical disparity based on race — "i.e., how minority candidates had performed when compared to white candidates". The District Court was wrong to argue that respondents' "motivation to avoid making promotions based on a test with a racially disparate impact ... does not, as a matter of law, constitute discriminatory intent." "That argument turns upon the City's objective — avoiding disparate-impact liability — while ignoring the City's conduct in the name of reaching that objective."

Second, Kennedy examined the statutory framework of Title VII, to determine whether Title VII's proscription of disparate treatment is afforded any lawful justifications in the disparate impact provision that it seems to conflict with. Looking to analogous Equal Protection cases, he reached the statutory construction that, in instances of conflict between the disparate-treatment and disparate-impact provisions, permissible justifications for disparate treatment must be grounded in the strong-basis-in-evidence standard.

He concluded that "once [a] process has been established and employers have made clear their selection criteria, they may not then invalidate the test results, thus upsetting an employee's legitimate expectation not to be judged on the basis of race. Doing so, absent a strong basis in evidence of an impermissible disparate impact, amounts to the sort of racial preference that Congress has disclaimed, §2000e–2(j), and is antithetical to the notion of a workplace where individuals are guaranteed equal opportunity regardless of race."

- He rejected petitioners' "strict approach," that under Title VII, "avoiding unintentional discrimination cannot justify intentional discrimination." That assertion ignores the fact that, by codifying the disparate-impact provision in 1991, Congress has expressly prohibited both types of discrimination, and would render a statutory provision "a dead letter".
- He rejected petitioners' suggestion that an employer "must be in violation of the disparate-impact provision before it can use compliance as a defense in a disparate-treatment suit." This rule would run counter to what we have recognized as Congress's intent that "voluntary compliance" be "the preferred means of achieving the objectives of Title VII."
- He rejected the respondents' position that "an employer's good-faith belief that its actions are necessary to comply with Title VII's disparate-impact provision should be enough to justify race-conscious conduct." This position would ignore "the original, foundational prohibition of Title VII," which bars employers from taking adverse action "because of ... race." §2000e–2(a)(1); and when Congress codified the disparate-impact provision in 1991, it made no exception to disparate-treatment liability for actions taken in a good-faith effort to comply with the new, disparate-impact provision in subsection (k). Respondents' policy would encourage race-based action at the slightest hint of disparate impact — e.g. causing employers to discard the results of lawful and beneficial promotional examinations even where there is little if any evidence of disparate-impact discrimination — which would amount to a de facto quota system, in which a "focus on statistics ... could put undue pressure on employers to adopt inappropriate prophylactic measures." "That operational principle could not be justified, for Title VII is express in disclaiming any interpretation of its requirements as calling for outright racial balancing." §2000e–2(j). The purpose of Title VII "is to promote hiring on the basis of job qualifications, rather than on the basis of race or color."
- He cited Justice Powell who, announcing the strong-basis-in-evidence standard for the plurality in Wygant v. Jackson Board of Education, recognized the tension between eliminating segregation and discrimination on the one hand and doing away with all governmentally imposed discrimination based on race on the other, stating that those "related constitutional duties are not always harmonious," and that "reconciling them requires ... employers to act with extraordinary care." The plurality required a strong basis in evidence because "[e]videntiary support for the conclusion that remedial action is warranted becomes crucial when the remedial program is challenged in court by nonminority employees." The Court applied the same standard in Richmond v. J. A. Croson Co., observing that "an amorphous claim that there has been past discrimination ... cannot justify the use of an unyielding racial quota."
- The same interests are at work in the interplay between the disparate-treatment and disparate-impact provisions of Title VII: Congress imposes liability on employers for unintentional discrimination, in order to rid the work-place of "practices that are fair in form, but discriminatory in operation." But Congress also prohibits employers from taking adverse employment actions "because of" race. Applying the strong-basis-in-evidence standard to Title VII gives effect to both provisions, allowing violations of one in the name of compliance with the other only in certain, narrow circumstances.
- The standard leaves ample room for employers' voluntary compliance efforts, which are essential to the statutory scheme and to Congress's efforts to eradicate workplace discrimination. See Firefighters, supra, at 515.
- And the standard appropriately constrains employers' discretion in making race-based decisions: It limits that discretion to cases in which there is a strong basis in evidence of disparate-impact liability, but it is not so restrictive that it allows employers to act only when there is a provable, actual violation.
- Resolving the statutory conflict in this way allows the disparate-impact prohibition to work in a manner that is consistent with other provisions of Title VII, including the prohibition on adjusting employment-related test scores on the basis of race. See §2000e–2(l). Examinations like those administered by the City create legitimate expectations on the part of those who took the tests. As is the case with any promotion exam, some of the firefighters here invested substantial time, money, and personal commitment in preparing for the tests. Employment tests can be an important part of a neutral selection system that safeguards against the very racial animosities Title VII was intended to prevent. Here, however, the firefighters saw their efforts invalidated by the City in sole reliance upon race-based statistics. If an employer cannot rescore a test based on the candidates' race, §2000e–2(l), then it follows a fortiori that it may not take the greater step of discarding the test altogether to achieve a more desirable racial distribution of promotion-eligible candidates — absent a strong basis in evidence that the test was deficient and that discarding the results is necessary to avoid violating the disparate-impact provision. Restricting an employer's ability to discard test results (and thereby discriminate against qualified candidates on the basis of their race) also is in keeping with Title VII's express protection of bona fide promotional examinations.

Next, Kennedy inquired whether the city's justifications for its disparate-treatment discrimination met this strong basis in evidence standard. He concluded that they did not: "Even if respondents were motivated as a subjective matter by a desire to avoid committing disparate-impact discrimination ... [t]here is no evidence — let alone the required strong basis in evidence — that the tests were flawed because they were not job-related or because other, equally valid and less discriminatory tests were available to the City. Fear of litigation alone cannot justify an employer's reliance on race to the detriment of individuals who passed the examinations and qualified for promotions."

The test results produced significant racial adverse impact, and confronted the City with a prima facie case of disparate-impact liability. That compelled them to "take a hard look at the examinations" to determine whether certifying the results would have had an impermissible disparate impact:

The problem for respondents is that a prima facie case of disparate-impact liability — essentially, a threshold showing of a significant statistical disparity, and nothing more — is far from a strong basis in evidence that the City would have been liable under Title VII had it certified the results. That is because the City could be liable for disparate-impact discrimination only if the examinations were not job related and consistent with business necessity, or if there existed an equally valid, less-discriminatory alternative that served the City's needs but that the City refused to adopt. §2000e–2(k)(1)(A), (C).

Neither condition holds:

1. He found no genuine dispute that the examinations were job-related and consistent with business necessity. The City's assertions to the contrary are "blatantly contradicted by the record." (Section II-C-1)
2. He found that respondents also lacked a strong basis in evidence of an equally valid, less-discriminatory testing alternative that the City, by certifying the examination results, would necessarily have refused to adopt. (Section II-C-2.)

Kennedy continues:

Respondents raise three arguments to the contrary, but each argument fails.
- First, respondents refer to testimony before the CSB that a different composite-score calculation — weighting the written and oral examination scores 30/70 — would have allowed the City to consider two black candidates for then-open lieutenant positions and one black candidate for then-open captain positions. (The City used a 60/40 weighting as required by its contract with the New Haven firefighters' union.) But respondents have produced no evidence to show that the 60/40 weighting was indeed arbitrary. In fact, because that formula was the result of a union-negotiated collective bargaining agreement, we presume the parties negotiated that weighting for a rational reason.
- Second, respondents argue that the City could have adopted a different interpretation of the "rule of three" that would have produced less discriminatory results. Respondents claim that employing "banding" here would have made four black and one Hispanic candidates eligible for then-open lieutenant and captain positions. But banding was not a valid alternative for this reason: Had the City reviewed the exam results and then adopted banding to make the minority test scores appear higher, it would have violated Title VII's prohibition of adjusting test results on the basis of race.
- Third, and finally, respondents refer to statements by Hornick in his telephone interview with the CSB regarding alternatives to the written examinations. But when the strong-basis-in-evidence standard applies, respondents cannot create a genuine issue of fact based on a few stray (and contradictory) statements in the record. And there is no doubt respondents fall short of the mark by relying entirely on isolated statements by Hornick.

He concluded:

The record in this litigation documents a process that, at the outset, had the potential to produce a testing procedure that was true to the promise of Title VII: No individual should face workplace discrimination based on race. Respondents thought about promotion qualifications and relevant experience in neutral ways. They were careful to ensure broad racial participation in the design of the test itself and its administration. As we have discussed at length, the process was open and fair.

The problem, of course, is that after the tests were completed, the raw racial results became the predominant rationale for the City's refusal to certify the results. The injury arises in part from the high, and justified, expectations of the candidates who had participated in the testing process on the terms the City had established for the promotional process. Many of the candidates had studied for months, at considerable personal and financial expense, and thus the injury caused by the City's reliance on raw racial statistics at the end of the process was all the more severe. Confronted with arguments both for and against certifying the test results — and threats of a lawsuit either way — the City was required to make a difficult inquiry. But its hearings produced no strong evidence of a disparate-impact violation, and the City was not entitled to disregard the tests based solely on the racial disparity in the results.

Our holding today clarifies how Title VII applies to resolve competing expectations under the disparate-treatment and disparate-impact provisions. If, after it certifies the test results, the City faces a disparate-impact suit, then in light of our holding today it should be clear that the City would avoid disparate-impact liability based on the strong basis in evidence that, had it not certified the results, it would have been subject to disparate-treatment liability.

=== Concurrence ===
Justice Scalia held the Court declined to clarify the conflict between Title VII's disparate-impact provisions and the Constitution's guarantee of equal protection. Specifically, although the Court clarified that the disparate-treatment provisions forbid "remedial" race-based actions when a disparate-impact violation would not otherwise result, "it is clear that Title VII not only permits but affirmatively requires such [remedial race-based] actions" when such a violation would result. In the latter situations, Title VII's disparate-impact provisions "place a racial thumb on the scales, often requiring employers to evaluate the racial outcomes of their policies, and to make decisions based on (because of) those racial outcomes." "That type of racial decision making is, as the Court explains, discriminatory."

=== Dissent ===
Ginsburg, joined by Stevens, Souter and Breyer, dissented. They would have held that New Haven was entitled to refrain from promoting the white firefighters, and its concern of being open to litigation – whether or not accurate – was legitimate.

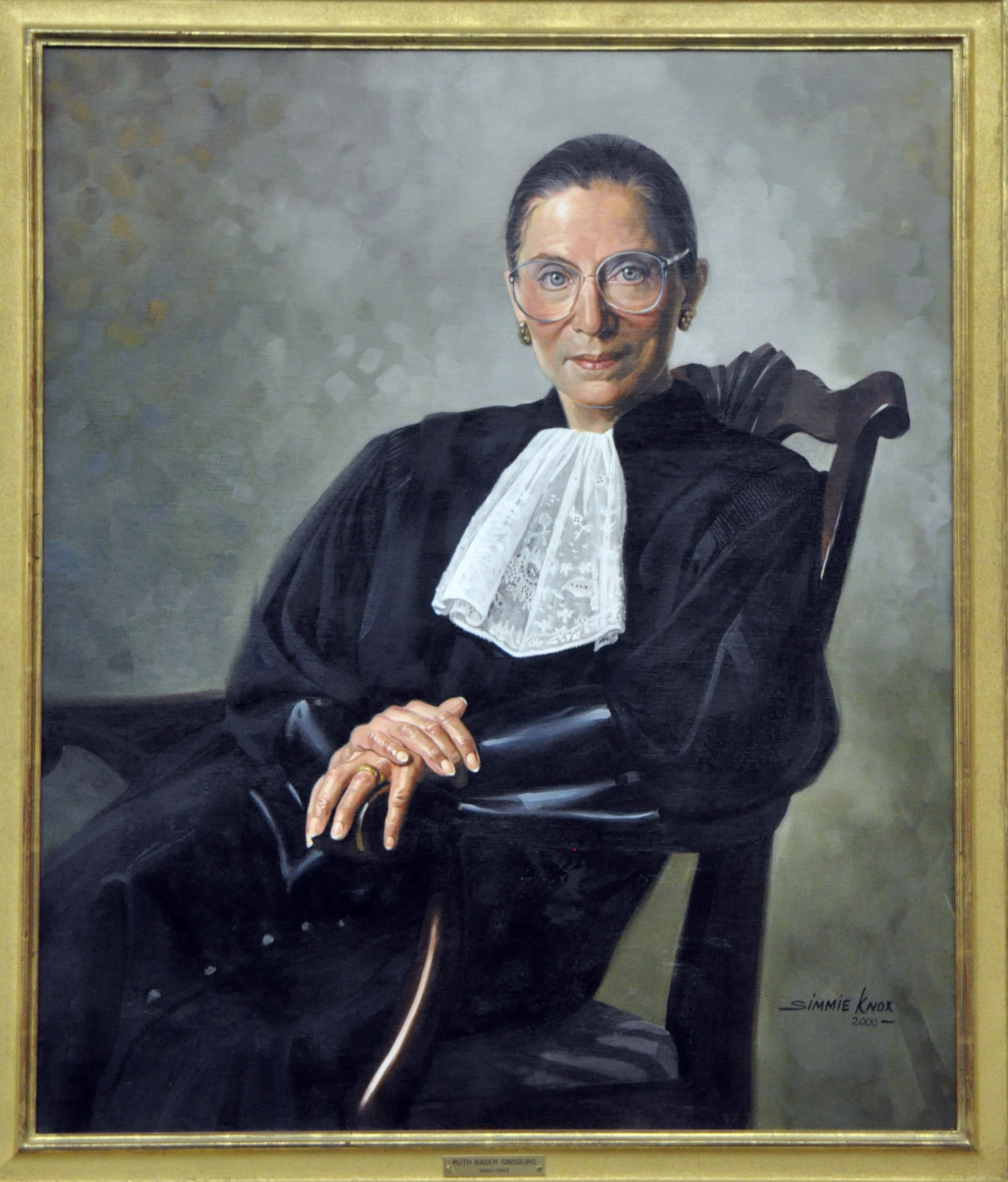
Justice Ginsburg in dissent.

New Haven maintains that it refused to certify the test results because it believed, for good cause, that it would be vulnerable to a Title VII disparate-impact suit if it relied on those results. The Court today holds that New Haven has not demonstrated "a strong basis in evidence" for its plea. Ante, at 2. In so holding, the Court pretends that "[t]he City rejected the test results solely because the higher scoring candidates were white." Ante, at 20. That pretension, essential to the Court's disposition, ignores substantial evidence of multiple flaws in the tests New Haven used. The Court similarly fails to acknowledge the better tests used in other cities, which have yielded less racially skewed outcomes.

By order of this Court, New Haven, a city in which African-Americans and Hispanics account for nearly 60 percent of the population, must today be served—as it was in the days of undisguised discrimination—by a fire department in which members of racial and ethnic minorities are rarely seen in command positions. In arriving at its order, the Court barely acknowledges the pathmarking decision in Griggs v. Duke Power Co., 401 U. S. 424 (1971), which explained the centrality of the disparate-impact concept to effective enforcement of Title VII of the Civil Rights Act of 1964. The Court's order and opinion, I anticipate, will not have staying power.

...

New Haven's population includes a greater proportion of minorities today than it did in the 1970s: Nearly 40 percent of the City's residents are African-American and more than 20 percent are Hispanic. Among entry-level firefighters, minorities are still underrepresented, but not starkly so. As of 2003, African-Americans and Hispanics constituted 30 percent and 16 percent of the City's firefighters, respectively. In supervisory positions, however, significant disparities remain. Overall, the senior officer ranks (captain and higher) are nine percent African-American and nine percent Hispanic. Only one of the Department's 21 fire captains is African-American. See App. in No. 06–4996–cv (CA2), p. A1588 (hereinafter CA2 App.). It is against this backdrop of entrenched inequality that the promotion process at issue in this litigation should be assessed.

...

Pursuant to New Haven's specifications, IOS developed and administered the oral and written exams. The results showed significant racial disparities. On the lieutenant exam, the pass rate for African-American candidates was about one-half the rate for Caucasian candidates; the pass rate for Hispanic candidates was even lower. On the captain exam, both African-American and Hispanic candidates passed at about half the rate of their Caucasian counterparts. See App. 225–226. More striking still, although nearly half of the 77 lieutenant candidates were African-American or Hispanic, none would have been eligible for promotion to the eight positions then vacant. The highest scoring African-American candidate ranked 13th; the top Hispanic candidate was 26th. As for the seven then-vacant captain positions, two Hispanic candidates would have been eligible, but no African-Americans. The highest scoring African-American candidate ranked 15th. See id., at 218–219.

These stark disparities, the Court acknowledges, sufficed to state a prima facie case under Title VII's disparate-impact provision. See ante, at 27 ("The pass rates of minorities ... f[e]ll well below the 80-percent standard set by the [Equal Employment Opportunity Commission (EEOC)] to implement the disparate-impact provision of Title VII."). New Haven thus had cause for concern about the prospect of Title VII litigation and liability. City officials referred the matter to the New Haven Civil Service Board (CSB), the entity responsible for certifying the results of employment exams.

Between January and March 2004, the CSB held five public meetings to consider the proper course. At the first meeting, New Haven's Corporation Counsel, Thomas Ude, described the legal standard governing Title VII disparate-impact claims. Statistical imbalances alone, Ude correctly recognized, do not give rise to liability. Instead, presented with a disparity, an employer "has the opportunity and the burden of proving that the test is job-related and consistent with business necessity." CA2 App. A724. A Title VII plaintiff may attempt to rebut an employer's showing of job-relatedness and necessity by identifying alternative selection methods that would have been at least as valid but with "less of an adverse or disparate or discriminatory effect." Ibid. See also id., at A738. Accordingly, the CSB Commissioners understood, their principal task was to decide whether they were confident about the reliability of the exams: Had the exams fairly measured the qualities of a successful fire officer despite their disparate results? Might an alternative examination process have identified the most qualified candidates without creating such significant racial imbalances?

...

Respondents were no doubt conscious of race during their decisionmaking process, the court acknowledged, but this did not mean they had engaged in racially disparate treatment. The conclusion they had reached and the action thereupon taken were race-neutral in this sense: "[A]ll the test results were discarded, no one was promoted, and firefighters of every race will have to participate in another selection process to be considered for promotion." Id., at 158. New Haven's action, which gave no individual a preference, "was 'simply not analogous to a quota system or a minority set-aside where candidates, on the basis of their race, are not treated uniformly.' " Id., at 157 (quoting Hayden, 180 F. 3d, at 50).

...

A reasonable endeavor to comply with the law and to ensure that qualified candidates of all races have a fair opportunity to compete is simply not what Congress meant to interdict. I would therefore hold that an employer who jettisons a selection device when its disproportionate racial impact becomes apparent does not violate Title VII's disparate-treatment bar automatically or at all, subject to this key condition: The employer must have good cause to believe the device would not withstand examination for business necessity. Cf. Faragher v. Boca Raton, 524 U. S. 775, 806 (1998) (observing that it accords with "clear statutory policy" for employers "to prevent violations" and "make reasonable efforts to discharge their duty" under Title VII).

...

To "reconcile" the supposed "conflict" between disparate treatment and disparate impact, the Court offers an enigmatic standard. Ante, at 20. Employers may attempt to comply with Title VII's disparate-impact provision, the Court declares, only where there is a "strong basis in evidence" documenting the necessity of their action. Ante, at 22. The Court's standard, drawn from inapposite equal protection precedents, is not elaborated. One is left to wonder what cases would meet the standard and why the Court is so sure this case does not.

1

In construing Title VII, I note preliminarily, equal protection doctrine is of limited utility. The Equal Protection Clause, this Court has held, prohibits only intentional discrimination; it does not have a disparate-impact component. See Personnel Administrator of Mass. v. Feeney, 442 U. S. 256, 272 (1979); Washington v. Davis, 426 U. S. 229, 239 (1976). Title VII, in contrast, aims to eliminate all forms of employment discrimination, unintentional as well as deliberate. Until today, cf. ante, at 25; ante, p. 1 (Scalia, J., concurring), this Court has never questioned the constitutionality of the disparate-impact component of Title VII, and for good reason. By instructing employers to avoid needlessly exclusionary selection processes, Title VII's disparate-impact provision calls for a "race-neutral means to increase minority ... participation"—something this Court's equal protection precedents also encourage. See Adarand Constructors, Inc. v. Peña, 515 U. S. 200, 238 (1995) (quoting Richmond v. J. A. Croson Co., 488 U. S. 469, 507 (1989)). "The very radicalism of holding disparate impact doctrine unconstitutional as a matter of equal protection," moreover, "suggests that only a very uncompromising court would issue such a decision." Primus, Equal Protection and Disparate Impact: Round Three, 117 Harv. L. Rev. 493, 585 (2003).

...

This case presents an unfortunate situation, one New Haven might well have avoided had it utilized a better selection process in the first place. But what this case does not present is race-based discrimination in violation of Title VII. I dissent from the Court's judgment, which rests on the false premise that respondents showed "a significant statistical disparity," but "nothing more." See ante, at 27–28.

== Significance ==
New Haven reinstated the examination results and promoted 14 of the 20 firefighters within months of the decision. The city settled the lawsuit by paying $2 million to the firefighter plaintiffs; giving each promotable individual three years of "service time" towards their pension; and paying their attorney, Karen Lee Torre, $3 million in fees and costs.

== See also ==
- US labor law
- Boise Kimber
- Griggs v. Duke Power Co.
- United Steelworkers v. Weber
- Marino v. Ortiz
- Piscataway v. Taxman
- Hayden v. County of Nassau (2d Cir. 1999)
- Bushey v. N.Y. State Civil Serv. Comm'n (2nd Cir. 1984)
- Kirkland v. New York State Department of Correctional Services (2nd Cir. 1983)
- Washington v. Davis
- Wygant v. Jackson Bd. of Ed.
- Watson v. Fort Worth Bank & Trust
- City of Richmond v. J.A. Croson Co.
- List of United States Supreme Court cases, volume 557
- List of United States Supreme Court cases
