= Timothy Hogues =

American politician

President of the New York State Civil Service Commission
- Designate
- Assuming office TBA
- Appointed by: Kathy Hochul
- Succeeding: Nancy G. Chaffetz

Member of the Erie County Legislature from the 1st district
- In office 2012–2013
- Preceded by: Barbara Miller-Williams
- Succeeded by: Barbara Miller-Williams

Personal details
- Political party: Democratic
- Children: 3
- Education: University at Buffalo (BA)

Timothy P. Hogues is an American politician who served as a member of the Erie County Legislature for the 1st district from 2012 to 2013.

== Education ==
Hogues graduated from the University at Buffalo with a Bachelor of Arts degree in business administration and management.

== Career ==
In August 2016, Erie County Executive Mark Poloncarz announced the appointment of Hogues as the new commissioner of senior services. Prior to being appointed commissioner, Hogues served as community planning coordinator and long-term care coordinator for the Department of Senior Services. In April 2022, Governor Kathy Hochul appointed Hogues to serve as chair of the New York State Civil Service Commission.

== Personal life ==
Hogues and his wife, Melissa, have three children.
