= Civil service commission =

Government agency regulating the employment of civil servants

A civil service commission (also known as a Public Service Commission) is a government agency or public body that is established by the constitution, or by the legislature, to regulate the employment and working conditions of civil servants, oversee hiring and promotions, and promote the values of the public service. Its role is roughly analogous to that of the human resources department in corporations. Civil service commissions are often independent from elected politicians, maintaining the separation of the permanent, professional civil service from government ministers.

In Fiji for example, the PSC reviews government statutory powers to ensure efficiency and effectiveness in meeting public sector management objectives. It also acts as the human relations department, or central personnel authority, for the citizens' interactions with the government.

The origin of the public service commission in many former British colonies was the White Paper Colonial 197 issued in 1950, which set out measures which were proposed to improve the quality and efficiency of the Colonial Service of the British administration. The setting up of public service commissions was proposed in its paragraph 21(xi) which mentioned that:

Public Service Commissions should be established in the Colonies. Subject to the general overriding powers of the Secretary of State, the selection and appointment of candidates in the Colonies to posts in the local service will lie with the Governor of the Colony. It is desirable that the Governor should be advised in these matters by a Public Service Commission appointed by him and so composed as to command the confidence of the Service and the public;

and that:

such Commissions should be established in the Colonies to advise the Governor on the selection and appointment of candidates to posts in the local service, and should be so composed as to command the confidence of the Service and the public.

== National civil service commissions ==
- Afghanistan: Independent Administrative Reform and Civil Service Commission
- (Australia) Australian Public Service Commission
- Bangladesh Public Service Commission
- Bhutan: Royal Civil Service Commission
- Brunei Public Service Commission
- Public Service Commission of Canada
- Taiwan: Examination Yuan of the Republic of China
- Fiji Public Service Commission
- Hong Kong Public Service Commission
- India: Union Public Service Commission
- Indonesia: National Civil Service Agency
- (Republic of Ireland) Ireland: Office of the Civil Service and Local Appointments Commissioners abolished 2004; succeeded by:
  - Commission for Public Service Appointments
  - Public Appointments Service
- Israel: State Service Commission
- Kenya Public Service Commission
- Malaysia: Public Service Commission
- Mauritius Public Service Commission
- Myanmar: Union Civil Service Board
- Nepal: Public Service Commission
- Nigeria: Federal Civil Service Commission
- Pakistan: Federal Public Service Commission
- Philippines: Civil Service Commission
- Samoa Public Service Commission
- Sri Lanka Public Service Commission
- Somaliland Civil Service Commission
- South Africa Public Service Commission
- Singapore: Public Service Commission
- Spain: Superior Personnel Commission
- United Kingdom: Civil Service Commission
- United States:
  - United States Civil Service Commission (defunct)
  - Office of Personnel Management (current)
  - Merit Systems Protection Board (current)
- Zimbabwe Public Service Commission

== Subnational civil service commissions ==
- Australia:
  - New South Wales: Public Service Commission
  - Queensland: Public Sector Commission
  - (Victoria (state)) Victorian Public Sector Commission
  - Western Australia: Public Sector Commission
- Canada:
  - Alberta: Public Service Commission
  - Manitoba: Public Service Commission
  - Newfoundland and Labrador: Public Service Commission
  - Nova Scotia: Public Service Commission
  - Ontario: Public Service Commission
  - Prince Edward Island: Public Service Commission
  - Quebec: Commission de la fonction publique
  - Saskatchewan: Public Service Commission
  - Yukon: Public Service Commission
- India: State Public Service Commissions
- Nigeria
  - Abia State Civil Service Commission
  - Adamawa State Civil Service Commission
  - Akwa Ibom State Civil Service Commission
  - Anambra State Civil Service Commission
  - Bauchi State Civil Service Commission
  - Bayelsa State Civil Service Commission
  - Benue State Civil Service Commission
  - Borno State Civil Service Commission
  - Cross River State Civil Service Commission
  - Delta State Civil Service Commission
  - Ebonyi State Civil Service Commission
  - Edo State Civil Service Commission
  - Ekiti State Civil Service Commission
  - Enugu State Civil Service Commission
  - Federal Capital Territory Civil Service Commission
  - Gombe State Civil Service Commission
  - Imo State Civil Service Commission
  - Jigawa State Civil Service Commission
  - Kaduna State Civil Service Commission
  - Kano State Civil Service Commission
  - Katsina State Civil Service Commission
  - Kebbi State Civil Service Commission
  - Kogi State Civil Service Commission
  - Kwara State Civil Service Commission
  - Lagos State Civil Service Commission
  - Nasarawa State Civil Service Commission
  - Niger State Civil Service Commission
  - Ogun State Civil Service Commission
  - Ondo State Civil Service Commission
  - Osun State Civil Service Commission
  - Oyo State Civil Service Commission
  - Plateau State Civil Service Commission
  - Rivers State Civil Service Commission
  - Sokoto State Civil Service Commission
  - Taraba State Civil Service Commission
  - Yobe State Civil Service Commission
  - Zamfara State Civil Service Commission
- United States
  - California State Personnel Board
  - Colorado State Personnel Board
  - Louisiana: State Civil Service Commission
  - Michigan Civil Service Commission
  - New Jersey Civil Service Commission
  - (New York (state)) New York Civil Service Commission
    - New York City Civil Service Commission
  - Pennsylvania: State Civil Service Commission
  - Local: In the United States, many local governments have their own civil service commissions.

== See also ==
- Category:Civil service commissions – articles about civil service commissions
- Public utilities commission (some government utilities regulation agencies are called public service commissions)
