= Bushey v. New York State Civil Service Commission =

American legal case

Bushey v. N.Y. State Civil Serv. Comm.
- Court: United States Court of Appeals for the Second Circuit
- Argued: February 15 1984
- Decided: April 16 1984
- Citation: 733 F.2d 220

Court membership
- Judges sitting: Timbers, Meskill, Pierce

Case opinions
- Majority: Pierce, joined by Timbers, Meskill

Laws applied
- Title VII of the Civil Rights Act of 1964

Bushey v. New York State Civil Serv. Comm'n, 733 F.2d 220, 224 (2d Cir. 1984) is a US labor law case from the Second Circuit applying the test for affirmative action from United Steelworkers v. Weber.

== Facts ==
The New York State Civil Service Commission issued an exam for positions of "Correction Captain" in New York's Correctional Services. The exam results are combined with credit for seniority and Armed Forces service to arrive at a ranking list, which list is used to fill positions as they become open. The specific test in issue was administered to 275 candidates on January 30, 1982. Thirty-two of these were minority candidates, and 243 were nonminority.

The minority pass rate (i.e. scoring above the 70th percentile) was 25% (eight persons) compared with the non-minority pass rate of 50% (48 persons). Under the 80 percent rule, the State determined that the Captains' exam had an adverse racial impact. The State reviewed these results in light of a rule of the Equal Employment Opportunity Commission, which states that evidence that an employer selects minority candidates for employment positions at a rate that is less than 80% of the selection rate for nonminorities "will generally be regarded ... as evidence of adverse impact," see 29 CFR § 1607.4(D) (1984). It concluded that the test's minority selection rate of approximately 50% demonstrated an adverse impact on minority candidates.

Faced with this statistical disparity, the fact that the State had been sued by minorities with respect to two prior examinations for correctional officer positions, and the lack of any indication that minorities would not perform equally well in the position of Correction Captain, the State unilaterally decided to raise the scores of minority candidates by establishing a separate normalization curve for minority candidates and equating the mean of that curve with the mean for nonminorities. The upshot of this action was that eight more minority candidates passed the test; although no nonminority candidates were taken off the list the scores of all minority candidates were increased, and the highest scoring minority candidate became the highest scoring of all the candidates.

By acting to eliminate the perceived adverse impact of the examination on minorities, the State anticipatorily sought to avoid litigation it assumed minority candidates would bring. The nonminorities, however, brought suit, alleging that the state's adjustment of minority candidates' raw test scores involved "reverse discrimination" against non-minority candidates in violation of Title VII of the Civil Rights Act of 1964 and the Fourteenth Amendment. They claimed they were "bumped" down the ranking list by minority candidates whose scores were increased.

== Judgment ==
=== District Court ===
The District Court agreed that the State's action violated Title VII for three reasons: first, it did not believe that the evidence supplied by the State established a prima facie case of discrimination; second, it did not believe in any event that the State could take race-conscious action when it had not attempted or considered rebutting a prima facie case with proof that the employment decisions were based on legitimate job-related criteria—in this case a professionally developed job-related examination; and third, it thought the remedy adopted by the State was "fundamentally flawed." 571 F.Supp. 1562 (1983). The district court held that before the state could take such voluntary action, it was required to

1) make out a prima facie case of adverse impact and
2) prove that this prima facie case was not rebuttable by evidence of test job validity.

=== Second Circuit ===
The Court of Appeals for the Second Circuit reversed. First, it held that the State had properly determined that a prima facie case was made out by reference to the EEOC guidelines. Then, it reasoned that the State was not required to rebut this case before taking the affirmative race-conscious steps taken here; instead, "a showing of a prima facie case of employment discrimination through a statistical demonstration of disproportionate racial impact constitutes a sufficiently serious claim of discrimination to serve as a predicate for employer-initiated, voluntary race conscious remedies."

The court suggested that the District Court's analysis was contrary to Title VII's policy favoring voluntary compliance because it only permitted the State to take race-conscious actions after there had been a judicial determination that the Act had been violated. Such a rule would actually promote litigation, and would only result in the State's waiting to be sued and then settling. The court reasoned that Title VII's preference for voluntary compliance would be seriously undermined if an employer were required to postpone settling a Title VII testing case pending a judicial determination of the test's validity. "[A] judicial determination of ... discrimination is not a prerequisite to an employer adopting voluntary, ... [sex]-conscious remedies to comply with Title VII." The court relied on its prior opinion in Kirkland v. New York State Department of Correctional Services, (2d Cir. 1983) in which it had approved a settlement with respect to the results of the written examination for Correction Lieutenant. The court also relied on United Steelworkers v. Weber, noting that in Weber the Court had approved voluntary affirmative action even in the absence of a determination that the employer had discriminated. In a footnote, the opinion refused to distinguish Weber on the ground that this case involved a public employer. 733 F.2d, at 227, n. 8. Finally, the court rejected the District Court's characterization of the "remedy" as "fundamentally flawed," noting that the score adjustment did not displace nonminority candidates from the list or bar their advancement. It nevertheless remanded the case for determination of whether the remedy "unnecessarily trammel[ed] the interests" of nonminority employees, as that standard was set in Weber.

== See also ==
- US labor law
