= Sonia Sotomayor Supreme Court nomination =

United States Supreme Court nomination

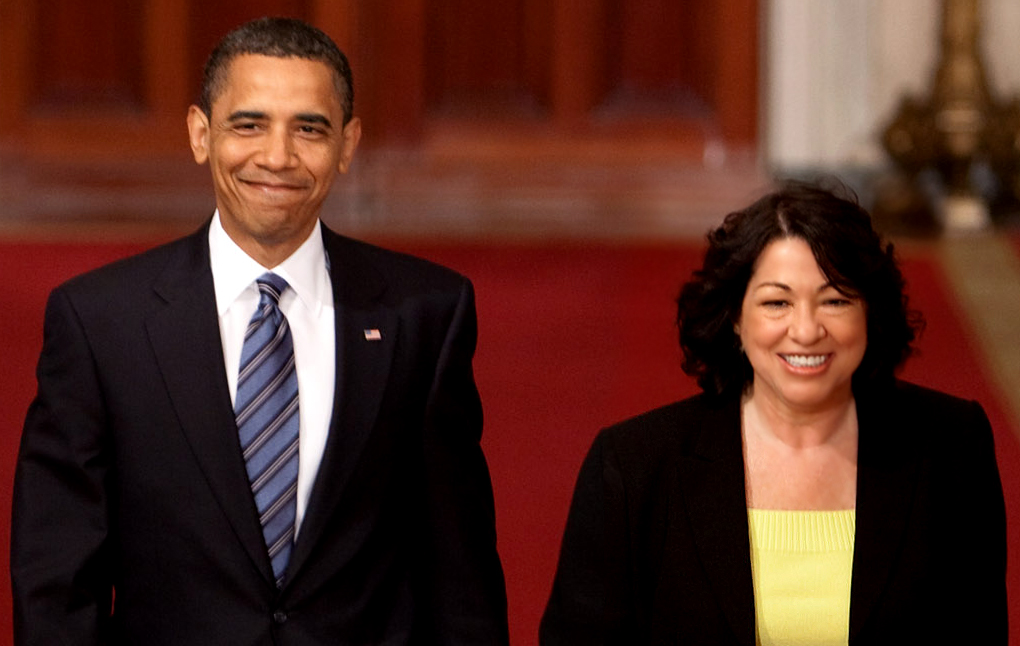
- President Obama and Sotomayor at the announcement of the nomination
- Nominee: Sonia Sotomayor
- Nominated by: Barack Obama (president of the United States)
- Succeeding: David Souter (associate justice)
- Date nominated: May 26, 2009 (announced); June 1, 2009 (formally nominated)
- Date confirmed: August 6, 2009
- Outcome: Approved by the U.S. Senate

Vote of the Senate Judiciary Committee
- Votes in favor: 13
- Votes against: 6
- Result: Reported favorably

Senate confirmation vote
- Votes in favor: 68
- Votes against: 31
- Result: Confirmed

On May 26, 2009, President Barack Obama announced his selection of Judge Sonia Sotomayor for Associate Justice of the Supreme Court of the United States, to replace retiring Justice David Souter. Sotomayor's nomination was submitted to the United States Senate on June 1, 2009, when the 111th Congress reconvened after its Memorial Day recess. Sotomayor was confirmed by the U.S. Senate on August 6, 2009 by a vote of 68–31, and was sworn in by Chief Justice John Roberts on August 8, 2009, becoming the first Hispanic to serve on the Supreme Court.

When nominated, Sotomayor was a sitting judge of the United States Court of Appeals for the Second Circuit, a position to which she had been appointed by Bill Clinton in 1998. Earlier, she served on the United States District Court for the Southern District of New York, appointed by George H. W. Bush in 1992.

== Nomination ==
=== Potential candidates ===
On May 1, 2009, David Souter announced that he would retire from the Supreme Court on June 29, at the start of Court's summer 2009 recess. He had served as an associate justice for 19 years. This was the first opportunity for President Barack Obama, who took office in January 2009, to fill a Supreme Court vacancy. The president and his advisors had begun preparing for this eventuality since before he was sworn in as president, during the transition. After Souter's retirement plans were announced, Sonia Sotomayor received early attention as the front-runner to succeed him. Others topping the various lists of most-likely candidates included: Elena Kagan, Diane Wood and Jennifer Granholm.

=== Announcement ===
On May 26, 2009, President Obama announced that he would nominate Sotomayor to the court. In his prepared remarks, the president called Sotomayor "an inspiring woman," noting that she "has worked at almost every level of our judicial system, providing her with a depth of experience and a breadth of perspective that will be invaluable as a Supreme Court justice." The nomination was formally received by the Senate on June 1, and was subsequently referred to the Judiciary Committee.

== Response to the nomination ==
Senate Judiciary Committee chair Patrick Leahy said he expected Sotomayor to be in the "mold of Justice Souter, who understands the real-world impact of the Court's decisions, rather than the mold of conservative activists who second-guess Congress." Fellow Democrat Russ Feingold said that "from all accounts, she is a highly qualified and very experienced judge."

Pat Roberts was the first Republican senator to officially come out against the nomination: "With all due respect to the nominee and nothing personal, I do not plan to vote for her. I did not feel she was appropriate on the appeals court. Since that time, she has made statements on the role of the appeals court I think is improper and incorrect.". Among the few Republicans who publicly supported the nomination was Olympia Snowe, who said of the nomination, "I commend President Obama for nominating a well-qualified woman, as I urged him to do during a one-on-one meeting on a variety of issues in the Oval Office earlier this month".

Former President George H. W. Bush defended Sotomayor and blasted former Speaker of the House Newt Gingrich and conservative radio host Rush Limbaugh for accusing her of being racist, calling it "not fair" and "not right". Bush also lauded Sotomayor for her "distinguished record on the bench" and stated that she was entitled to a fair hearing. Accusations of racial bias stemmed from a 2002 publication, in which Sotomayor said that she "would hope that a wise Latina woman with the richness of her experiences would more often than not reach a better conclusion than a white male who hasn't lived that life." In her 2009 confirmation hearings, she distanced herself from the 2002 statement, saying "I do not believe that any racial, ethnic or gender group has an advantage in sound judging. I do believe that every person has an equal opportunity to be a good and wise judge, regardless of their background or life experiences."

Additionally,

- Al Sharpton called the nomination "prudent, groundbreaking and the right choice at this time in our nation's history as we face serious constitutional and legal questions that will impact the lives of Americans for decades to come."
- Cecile Richards, president of pro-choice group Planned Parenthood, said "What our nation needs from our Supreme Court justices is a deep understanding of the law, an appreciation of the impact of the court's decisions on everyday Americans, and a commitment to the protection of our individual liberties. Judge Sotomayor will bring this dedication and commitment with her to the bench."
- Randall Terry, founder of the pro-life group Operation Rescue, urged Republicans to block a Senate vote on Sotomayor saying, "Do GOP leaders have the courage and integrity to filibuster an activist, pro-Roe judge?"
- Larry Klayman, founder of the conservative groups Freedom Watch and Judicial Watch, offered guarded praise: "While I would have liked to see a more conservative libertarian type on the high court, President Obama's selection of New York federal appeals court Judge Sonia Sotomayer [sic] was a very prudent and wise decision from a far left liberal like Obama. Having initially been appointed to the bench by President George H. W. Bush, soon to be justice Sotomayer has previously pledged to follow the Constitution, and not legislate from the bench, and her career as a federal court judge suggests, as a whole, that this is the way she will administer to the law."
- Wendy E. Long, counsel for the Judicial Confirmation Network says "Judge Sotomayor is a liberal judicial activist of the first order who thinks her own personal political agenda is more important than the law as written. She thinks that judges should dictate policy, and that one's sex, race, and ethnicity ought to affect the decisions one renders from the bench."
- Tom Tancredo, former Republican U.S. House member, appeared on CNN to voice his opposition to the nomination. When Rick Sanchez asked him if Sotomayor was a racist, Tancredo replied, "Certainly her words would indicate that that is the truth".

== Judiciary Committee review ==
=== Confirmation hearings ===
In late May 2009, President Obama indicated that he wished to see Sotomayor confirmed by the beginning of the Senate recess on August 7, 2009. Her confirmation hearings before the Senate Judiciary Committee began on July 13, 2009. From July 13 through July 16, she underwent multiple rounds of questioning by each member of the committee.

==== Day 1 (July 13) ====
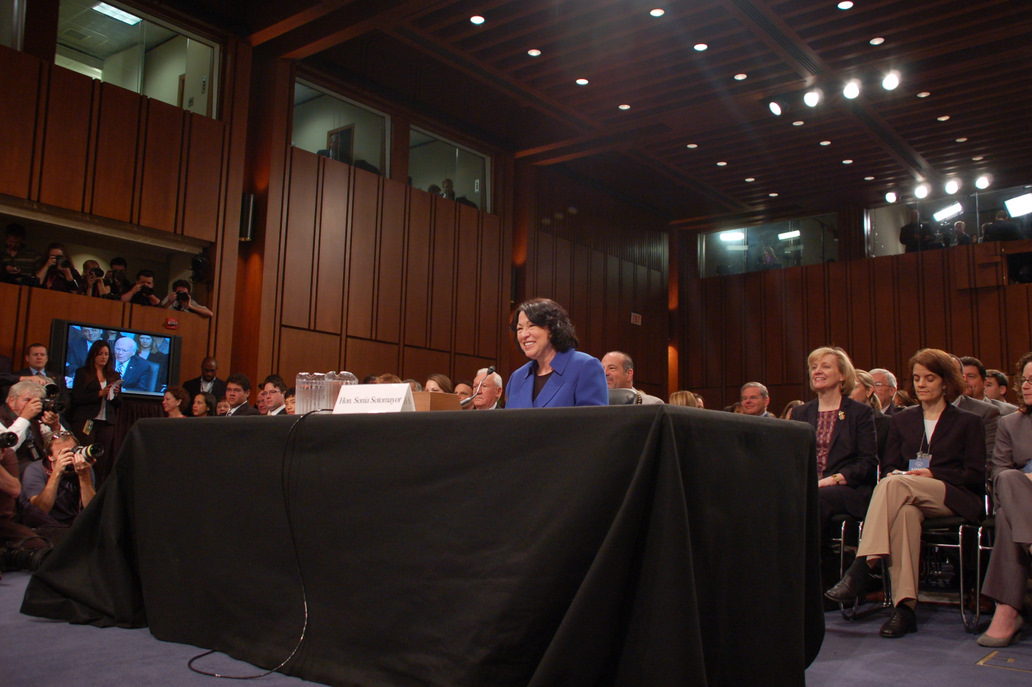
Sotomayor before the Judiciary Committee

When the Judiciary Committee convened on July 13, Senator Charles Schumer proclaimed that the opportunity that Sotomayor has could not have happened "anywhere else in the world", saying that America is "God's noble experiment". Out the many notable speakers, the Committee also welcomed newly sworn in Senator Al Franken (D-MN), who marked his first Judiciary hearing on the committee since he was sworn in five days earlier. Two senators' statements were disrupted by hecklers. An unidentified man hollered, "What about the unborn?" during Dianne Feinstein's (D-CA) speech. Norma McCorvey, the "Jane Roe" in the Roe v. Wade Supreme Court case about abortion rights, and Francis Mahoney, both yelled during Franken's opening statement. McCorvey and Mahoney were arrested, along with Robert James and Andrew Beacham. Leahy warned spectators to behave themselves and not to express any outbursts for or against Sotomayor or senators.

While committee Democrats generally praised Sotomayor, Republicans expressed skepticism about Sotomayor's ability to be judicially impartial. Senator Jeff Sessions (R-AL) brought up Sotomayor's membership in the Puerto Rican Legal Defense and Education Fund as concern over Sotomayor's decision in reviewing the district court case Ricci v. DeStefano. In that case, a three-judge panel that included Sotomayor ruled that a promotion test for firefighters in New Haven, Connecticut was discriminatory and thus void. A few weeks prior to the Sotomayor confirmation hearings, the Supreme Court reversed the decision.

Sotomayor began by thanking the 87 senators she "has the pleasure" of meeting and her family, including her mother, who joined her in the hearing. Sotomayor also said she was "very humbled" to be nominated, noting also she had seen the American judiciary system from many different perspectives. During her speech, she commented, "The task of a judge is not to make the law, it is to apply the law." Alexander Bolton of The Hill attributed such a pledge to George W. Bush-nominated Justices John G. Roberts and Samuel Alito. During her speech, Sotomayor also narrated her life story from her high school years while she lived in the projects, praising her mother: "She set the example, studying alongside my brother and me at our kitchen table so that she could become a registered nurse."

==== Day 2 (July 14) ====
On July 14, 2009, the first round of questioning began. Committee Chairman Patrick Leahy (D-VT) began the session, and largely focused on Sotomayor's judicial record. The nominee took the opportunity to explain her ideals, and described herself as impartial and deferential to precedent, noting "It's important to remember that, as a job, I don't make law." Leahy then concentrated on the "Tarzan burglar" case, which Sotomayor prosecuted as assistant district attorney in Manhattan during the early 1980s. Sotomayor tied a series of incidents together and persuaded the trial judge to let her try the burglar on a number of crimes in one case. Leahy also gave Sotomayor the opportunity to explain her ruling in the Ricci case, which the Supreme Court overturned after a ruling by a panel of which she was a member. Sotomayor stated that the ruling was based on precedent, and that it would have come out differently in light of the standard subsequently established by the Supreme Court on appeal.

Ranking Republican Jeff Sessions (R-AL) then began questioning, and notably referenced her "wise Latina" remark. Sotomayor stated that it was "meant to inspire" young people of Latino ancestry, and that she "was trying to play on Sandra Day O'Connor's words. My play fell flat. It was bad."

Sotomayor was then questioned by Senator Herb Kohl (D-WI), who questioned her stance on abortion. She responded by noting that "there is a right to privacy," and that Roe v. Wade is "settled law." Kohl also inquired about her stance on the Bush v. Gore case, which stopped the recount during the 2000 election.

In regard to her comments about her personal experiences and sympathies when interpreting the Constitution, Senator Orrin Hatch (R-UT) questioned her ability to rule on issues such as the second amendment. Sotomayor answered by stating that she has ruled in favor of the second amendment, and that she personally has friends who use guns for hunting.

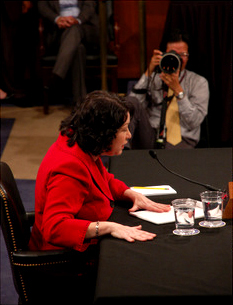
Sotomayor before the Senate Judiciary Committee on July 14, 2009

Senator Dianne Feinstein (D-CA) next highlighted key experience points that she had assessed over her sixteen years on the committee. Feinstein then argued against claims that Sotomayor was an "activist judge", referencing the Ricci case, in stating that conservative members of the Supreme Court have been the real activists in "discarding judicial precedents in recent years."

Senator Chuck Grassley (R-IA) again questioned his interpretation that her statements meant she was ruling by her feelings or experiences rather than by law, by stating that the "job (of Supreme Court Justice) is not to impose their own personal opinions of right and wrong." Sotomayor assured him that she did not. During one of Sotomayor's answers to Grassley, a protester notably erupted, shouting anti-abortion statements that accused Sotomayor of being a "baby killer" and to "save the babies." Grassley then joked that "people always say I have the ability to turn people on," after the heckler had been taken out of the room and arrested by police.

Senator Russ Feingold (D-WI) then questioned her on "post-9/11 policies," as well as her opinions on such cases as the Court's decisions in Rasul, Hamdi, Hamdan and Boumediene. Sotomayor responded that "the events of that day [...] were sometimes used to justify policies that depart so far from what America stands for" and that "A judge should never rule from fear."

Senator Jon Kyl (R-AZ) once again raised the point of judging based on personal feelings or experiences by noting President Barack Obama's comment that judges rulings may be influenced by what's in their hearts. Sotomayor responded by saying that "[she] wouldn't approach the issue of judging in the way the president does." It was the first time that Sotomayor publicly attempted to distance herself from the president. Kyl also again referenced her "wise Latina" quote, and she again stated that it was meant to inspire young Latino students. Sotomayor also made clear that "if you look at my history on the bench, you will know that I do not believe that any ethnic, gender or race group has an advantage in sound judging." Senator Leahy defended Sotomayor in the face of ridicule by Senator Kyl.

In asking if Sotomayor felt sympathy for victims in cases that she had ruled on—specifically a case involving a TWA airliner which exploded off the coast of New York, in which the families of the victims, many poor, attempted to sue the manufacturer to recover some of their losses—Senator Charles Schumer (D-NY) noted that "empathy is the opposite of indifference." In a later statement, Schumer said that "in [Sotomayor's] courtroom the rule of law always triumphs," with which Sotomayor agreed.

Sotomayor's Latina woman statement was once again quoted up by Senator Lindsey Graham (R-SC). Graham opined that "if I had said anything like that, and my reasoning was that I was trying to inspire somebody, they would have had my head," and also "If Lindsey Graham said, I will make a better Senator than 'X' because of my experience as a caucasian male, makes me better able to represent the people of South Carolina, and my opponent was a minority ... It would make national news ... and it should." Graham claimed that he would not judge Sotomayor based on that one statement, while making it clear that "others could come nowhere close to that statement, and survive." Sotomayor agreed, but still represented that her words were taken out of context, specifically "in the context of the person's life." Graham later brought up statements that had been made by anonymous lawyers which described Sotomayor's temperament in a negative fashion. Despite the tone of Graham's points, he stated that he may still vote for her.

As the final questioner of the day, Senator Richard Durbin (D-IL) asked Sotomayor about her opinions on Justice Blackmun's quote that he will cease to tinker with the death penalty, and on his regret concerning the disparity in crack/powder cocaine sentencing for which Congress, and he, had voted. Sotomayor demurred from criticizing Congress and more or less passed on answering. Durbin followed up on his death penalty question emphasizing his concern about courts following up on assuring appeals plaintiffs about DNA evidence that may have come to light since their convictions, and he also brought up the case of Ledbetter v. Goodyear Tire & Rubber Co. in stating that "the recent decision of Ledbetter v. Goodyear Tire and Rubber is a classic example of the Supreme Court putting activism over common sense," in reference to statements made by Republican critics who had labeled her as an activist judge.

After the conclusion of Senator Durbin's statements, the committee adjourned.

==== Day 3 (July 15) ====
On July 15, 2009, the third day of questioning began with Senator John Cornyn (R-TX), who immediately went after her "wise Latina" remark once again, in trying to further clarify the difference between that statement and the statement that Sotomayor has compared hers to, in which former Supreme Court Justice Sandra Day O'Connor likened the decisions made by a "wise old woman" and a "wise old man". Cornyn also noted a 1996 quote made by Sotomayor, in which she stated that judges can "change law". Sotomayor went on to claim that the statement was taken out of context, and that she was explaining the process of law to the public, and that judges "can't change law. We are not lawmakers." Cornyn also asked if President Obama had asked Sotomayor's opinion on abortion rights. She responded that "[he] did not ask me about any specific legal questions [...] or any social issues." Cornyn ended by asking for further explanation about her ruling in the Ricci case.

Senator Ben Cardin (D-MD) sought to balance Senator Lindsey Graham's selected anonymous statements, decrying about Sotomayor's temperament, by reading positive reviews from fellow lawyers and judges. Cardin also raised the Voting Rights Act, and inquired Sotomayor's opinion on the right of the public to participate in voting. Sotomayor stated that voting is a fundamental right, and that the Congress has done a good job in regard to protecting the right to vote. Cardin recognized Sotomayor's achievements at Princeton University, and asked of her opinion of hearing different voices in public schools, as well as steps the federal government could take to further recognize diversity. Sotomayor cited the example of the University of Michigan, which promoted "as much diversity as possible." She also referenced the Equal Protection Clause under the law. In closing his statement, Cardin finally asked about Sotomayor's opinion on privacy, in terms of technology, and how it should be interpreted under the Constitution, which was "written in the eighteenth century." Sotomayor made it clear that privacy is specifically protected under the Constitution.

In reacting to the outbursts by anti-abortion advocates, Senator Tom Coburn (R-OK) asked numerous questions in regard to abortion under the law. Sotomayor answered by stating that she would need to look at the respective states' laws in the individual cases, and that she would not be able to answer the question without being informed about the details of the specific case. She also made it clear that "[judges] do not make policy" in terms of abortion, but only apply the law as it is specified. Coburn then went on to inquire about the Second Amendment, and referenced District of Columbia v. Heller, in asking if it was or was not the fundamental right of Americans to bear arms. Sotomayor agreed with Coburn that there is a fundamental and individual right to bear arms under the Second Amendment. Going further, Coburn then inquired about Sotomayor's personal opinion on the right to self-defense, which Sotomayor steadfastly refused to answer according to her own opinion, answering instead by stating that under New York law, facing certain imminent threat, "you can use force to repel that, and that would be legal." Coburn then asked if there was any right to use any foreign law in a judge's rulings in the United States. Sotomayor stated that "Foreign law cannot be used ... as a precedent" unless U.S. statute so directs.

Senator Sheldon Whitehouse (D-RI) reassured Sotomayor that she was doing well in her hearing. Whitehouse then asked about Sotomayor's role in the Puerto Rican Legal Defense Fund, inquiring if there was a vetting process in deciding the board members. Sotomayor stated there was none. Whitehouse then went on to ask about search and seizure, as well as the federal government's involvement in warrants, in terms of fighting "terrorist extremists". She stated that it was the judge's decision whether a warrant should or should not be issued, based on the evidence presented.

Senator Amy Klobuchar (D-MN) went back to previous statements made by Sotomayor, as to whether rulings should be based on personal feelings or on law. Sotomayor reiterated her statements that she can only "apply the law", and not make it. Klobuchar then asked about a child pornography case, in which a warrant was not properly attained. Sotomayor described that she had sided with the panel, which had ruled that the search was unconstitutional, but the police officers had acted in "good faith". Further statements by Klobuchar were very supportive of Sotomayor, and noted her sentencings of white collar defendants.

Senator Ted Kaufman (D-DE) asked about Sotomayor's tenure as a litigator of commercial law cases. Kaufman asked numerous questions about how her commercial practice incorporates itself into her current evaluations and rulings as a judge. Kaufman then referenced a case in which she ruled for legal immunity for the New York Stock Exchange, despite Sotomayor's statement that their "behavior was egregious". Kaufman also asked questions on antitrust law, and about how economic theory related to judicial decisions.

After a brief recess, Senator Arlen Specter (D-PA) first complimented Sotomayor on her handling of questions during the hearing. Specter then once again brought up the "wise Latina" comments, and likened them to similar statements from others currently on the Supreme Court. The terror surveillance program was then brought up, with Specter very critical of former President Bush's wiretapping of US citizens without warrants. Sotomayor largely avoided getting immersed in the controversy. Specter then made a case for allowing television cameras into the courtroom. Sotomayor stated that she personally allowed television cameras into her courtroom, but conceded that it is up to the justices on the Supreme Court whether to allow it at that level.

The newest member of the committee, Senator Al Franken (D-MN), noted that the "hearings are a way for Americans to learn about the court, and the impact on their lives." He transitioned to free speech in regard to the internet, and noted the value of such tools as Twitter to convey the facts on the ground of the recent Iranian election protests. Franken asked about the role of Internet service providers regarding the issue of net neutrality, in speeding up the provider's own content while slowing down other providers' content. Sotomayor stated that the "role of the court is to not make the policy, it is to wait until Congress acts." Franken further pressed by asking "Isn't there a compelling, overriding, first amendment right here, for Americans to have access to the internet?" Sotomayor stated that "rights are rights, and what the court looks at is how Congress balances those rights in a particular situation, and then judge whether that balance is within constitutional boundaries [...] and then we'll look at that and see if it's constitutional." Franken asked for the definition of "judicial activism", which Sotomayor said was neither descriptive of her nor a term she uses, averring that she does not use labels. Franken notably then pulled out his pocket Constitution, referencing the Fifteenth Amendment to the United States Constitution in noting the recent decision to uphold the Voting Rights Act, which Sotomayor declined to speak on because the case was pending a future ruling by the Supreme Court. Franken asked if the words birth control and privacy were in the Constitution, in reference to previous Senators' statements on whether or not the word abortion was in the Constitution. Sotomayor answered that neither of those words is in the Constitution, after which Franken asked if the Constitution was "at all relevant" in regard to certain issues, which Sotomayor argued against. Franken finally asked if privacy issues were involved in abortion rights, and Sotomayor agreed.

The committee then adjourned to a closed session to review a Federal Bureau of Investigation background check, which is a part of the regular vetting process. Then, after reconvening, Senator Jeff Sessions began his second round of questioning by bringing up the Puerto Rican Legal Defense Fund, and asked if she had been involved in fundraising. Sotomayor stated that board members serve other functions than fundraising, including "employment, public health, education, and others." Senator Leahy then interjected, and followed up on his concerns over the Second Amendment. Senator Kohl then brought up arguments mentioned by Ted Kaufman in regard to antitrust laws, and Sotomayor responded by stating that she would, at the "court's precedent, [...] apply it" to the situation. Kohl then gave a statistic stating that the Supreme Court only hears "about one percent" of the cases that are brought before the court. Senator Orrin Hatch gave further arguments about the Doctrine of Incorporation, and further reviewed Sotomayor's statement of "fidelity to the law". Hatch also brought up the right to privacy, and that Sotomayor had stated that the Constitution "cannot be bent", and that courts "can apply the words of the Constitution to the facts of the case before them." Hatch next brought up once again the issue of "empathy" in judicial ruling. Sotomayor once again responded that personal experience does not trump the law.

After a recess, Senator Feinstein drew a line of support for Sotomayor. Senator Grassley then brought up the issue of gay marriage, and whether the federal government or the states' governments should decide the issue. Sotomayor described the process, but not her own personal opinion on the matter or how she would approach the case. Grassley continued to press on Sotomayor's rulings in multiple cases, with Sotomayor explaining the process of judging involved in each specific case. Senator Cardin was the final Senator to question Sotomayor, and thanked Sotomayor for her service, and for appearing before the Judiciary Committee. Cardin asked about freedom of religion, and the separation of church and state in the United States, to which Sotomayor was supportive of the law involving freedom of religion, and restriction of the states to form their own religion. Recess was called after Senator Cardin finished questioning.

==== Day 4 (July 16) ====
On July 16, 2009, the second round of questioning continued with Senator Jon Kyl. Kyl immediately began asking about the Supreme Court's precedent in the Ricci v. DeStefano case. Sotomayor stated that the precedent involved "the city discriminating a certain race", despite stating that there was no precedent, while originally ruling on the case. Kyl then asked about her statements involving district and circuit courts, in following precedent. Sotomayor then stated that "when precedent is set [...] they have policy ramifications." Senator Dianne Feinstein then began to follow up on questions raised by Senator Kyl. Feinstein also referenced her wise Latina statement, in stating that Feinstein "would like to put it in the context of women. In asking if she felt she was an inspiration to women, Sotomayor then stated that "[her] career as a judge ... does serve as an inspiration for others." Feinstein then noted that she thinks Sotomayor will be a great Supreme Court Justice.

Senator Lindsey Graham then began his questioning, asking about whether or not the Second Amendment was a fundamental right, which Sotomayor agreed. Graham then asked "What binds you, when it comes to a fundamental right?" Sotomayor responded by quickly saying, "The rule of law." Graham then asked about abortion rights, in regard to the Puerto Rican Legal Defense Fund. Sotomayor refused to answer the question. Next asked about the death penalty, and a statement she made in the 1980s in opposition to the death penalty. Graham then stated that her stance on the issues is "left of center." Graham then asked if Sotomayor regretted her wise Latina remark, to which Sotomayor stated that "it was not [her] intention to leave the impression, that people have gotten from [her] words" about the wise Latina comment.

Senator Amy Klobuchar, then began her questioning, and began by reading positive letters, casting Sotomayor in a positive light. Senator John Cornyn next questioned statements that she had made in speeches, and how they are "quite different" from what "[she] is saying before the committee." Sotomayor answered by stating to "look at [her] record." Next asking about gay marriage, and whether that would be making law, or interpreting the law, if the Supreme Court were to rule in favor of gay marriage, and Sotomayor largely attempted to avoid answering the question. Next asking about campaign contributions, and difference of a contribution and a bribe, and referenced President Barack Obama's large amounts of fundraising from private funds, Sotomayor agreed with the statements that Cornyn made about whether or not it was the right of individuals to contribute. Senator Arlen Specter began his questioning, and asked about the number of cases that the Supreme Court hears, to which Sotomayor responded that "it appears" the Supreme Court "has the capacity to hear more cases." Specter raised specific court cases, and referenced his previous questions about the September 11 attacks in 2001, to which Sotomayor responded in the same fashion as when she had been asked the question before. The committee recessed afterward.

After recess, Senator Tom Coburn began his questioning of Sotomayor, and began by again asking about precedent, and ruling by the law. Coburn then went on to reiterate his earlier questions about abortion, including whether or not Roe v. Wade overrode the state's positions on abortion, which Sotomayor stated that she did not know, before Coburn stated that it was. Senator Al Franken then began his questioning, and asked why Sotomayor wants to be a Supreme Court justice. Franken then stated that he would in fact be supporting Sotomayor, after she told a story from when she first began her career.

Senator Jeff Sessions next began a third round of questioning, to raise concerns that he had about some of Sotomayor's answers. Sessions then stated that he would not support a Republican filibuster. Third-round questioning continued with Senators Orrin Hatch, Chuck Grassley, Jon Kyl, Lindsey Graham, John Cornyn, Tom Coburn, and Patrick Leahy briefly raising their concerns, and getting short answers from Sotomayor.

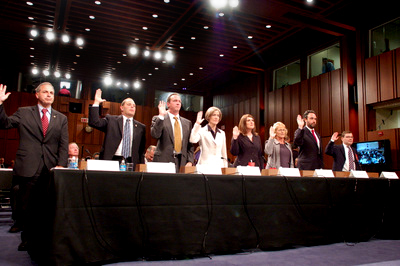
The third panel of testimony being sworn in before the Judiciary Committee

===== Witness testimony =====
Witness testimony began with Kim Askew and Mary Boies, representing the Standing Committee of the American Bar Association, who reviewed Sotomayor as "highly qualified". Attorney General of Arkansas Dustin McDaniel, New York City Mayor Michael Bloomberg, New York County District Attorney Robert M. Morgenthau, and Leader of the Conference of Civil Rights Professor Wade Henderson testified in support of Sotomayor. Peter Kirsanow of the U.S. Commission on Civil Rights and Linda Chavez of the Center for Equal Opportunity as well as firefighters Frank Ricci and Lieutenant Ben Vargas testified in opposition to Sotomayor's confirmation.

=== Committee vote ===
On July 28, 2009, the Senate Judiciary Committee voted 13–6 in favor of Sotomayor's nomination, sending it to the full Senate for a final confirmation vote. Democrats extolled her fairness and judicial qualifications, while most Republicans questioned her impartiality and warned of the ramifications that her appointment to the Court would have, in their view, on gun rights and private property rights. Only one Republican, Lindsey Graham, voted in the affirmative.

== Full Senate vote ==
Senate vote on PN506 Sonia Sotomayor, of New York, to be an Associate Justice of the Supreme Court of the United States.
August 6, 2009	Party			Total votes
August 6, 2009	Democratic	Republican	Independent	Total votes
Yea	57	9	2	68
Nay	0	31	0	31
Result: Confirmed
Roll call vote: Senator / Party / State / Vote; Daniel Akaka / D / Hawaii / Yea; Lamar Alexander / R / Tennessee / Yea; John Barrasso / R / Wyoming / Nay; Max Baucus / D / Montana / Yea; Evan Bayh / D / Indiana / Yea; Mark Begich / D / Alaska / Yea; Michael Bennet / D / Colorado / Yea; Bob Bennett / R / Utah / Nay; Jeff Bingaman / D / New Mexico / Yea; Kit Bond / R / Missouri / Yea; Barbara Boxer / D / California / Yea; Sherrod Brown / D / Ohio / Yea; Sam Brownback / R / Kansas / Nay; Jim Bunning / R / Kentucky / Nay; Richard Burr / R / North Carolina / Nay; Roland Burris / D / Illinois / Yea; Robert Byrd / D / West Virginia / Yea; Maria Cantwell / D / Washington / Yea; Ben Cardin / D / Maryland / Yea; Tom Carper / D / Delaware / Yea; Bob Casey Jr. / D / Pennsylvania / Yea; Saxby Chambliss / R / Georgia / Nay; Tom Coburn / R / Oklahoma / Nay; Thad Cochran / R / Mississippi / Nay; Susan Collins / R / Maine / Yea; Kent Conrad / D / North Dakota / Yea; Bob Corker / R / Tennessee / Nay; John Cornyn / R / Texas / Nay; Mike Crapo / R / Idaho / Nay; Jim DeMint / R / South Carolina / Nay; Chris Dodd / D / Connecticut / Yea; Byron Dorgan / D / North Dakota / Yea; Dick Durbin / D / Illinois / Yea; John Ensign / R / Nevada / Nay; Mike Enzi / R / Wyoming / Nay; Russ Feingold / D / Wisconsin / Yea; Dianne Feinstein / D / California / Yea; Al Franken / D / Minnesota / Yea; Kirsten Gillibrand / D / New York / Yea; Lindsey Graham / R / South Carolina / Yea; Chuck Grassley / R / Iowa / Nay; Judd Gregg / R / New Hampshire / Yea; Kay Hagan / D / North Carolina / Yea; Tom Harkin / D / Iowa / Yea; Orrin Hatch / R / Utah / Nay; Kay Bailey Hutchison / R / Texas / Nay; Jim Inhofe / R / Oklahoma / Nay; Daniel Inouye / D / Hawaii / Yea; Johnny Isakson / R / Georgia / Nay; Mike Johanns / R / Nebraska / Nay; Tim Johnson / D / South Dakota / Yea; Ted Kaufman / D / Delaware / Yea; Ted Kennedy / D / Massachusetts / Not Voting; John Kerry / D / Massachusetts / Yea; Amy Klobuchar / D / Minnesota / Yea; Herb Kohl / D / Wisconsin / Yea; Jon Kyl / R / Arizona / Nay; Mary Landrieu / D / Louisiana / Yea; Frank Lautenberg / D / New Jersey / Yea; Patrick Leahy / D / Vermont / Yea; Carl Levin / D / Michigan / Yea; Joe Lieberman / ID / Connecticut / Yea; Blanche Lincoln / D / Arkansas / Yea; Richard Lugar / R / Indiana / Yea; Mel Martínez / R / Florida / Yea; John McCain / R / Arizona / Nay; Claire McCaskill / D / Missouri / Yea; Mitch McConnell / R / Kentucky / Nay; Bob Menendez / D / New Jersey / Yea; Jeff Merkley / D / Oregon / Yea; Barbara Mikulski / D / Maryland / Yea; Lisa Murkowski / R / Alaska / Nay; Patty Murray / D / Washington / Yea; Bill Nelson / D / Florida / Yea; Ben Nelson / D / Nebraska / Yea; Mark Pryor / D / Arkansas / Yea; Jack Reed / D / Rhode Island / Yea; Harry Reid / D / Nevada / Yea; Jim Risch / R / Idaho / Nay; Pat Roberts / R / Kansas / Nay; Jay Rockefeller / D / West Virginia / Yea; Bernie Sanders / I / Vermont / Yea; Chuck Schumer / D / New York / Yea; Jeff Sessions / R / Alabama / Nay; Jeanne Shaheen / D / New Hampshire / Yea; Richard Shelby / R / Alabama / Nay; Olympia Snowe / R / Maine / Yea; Arlen Specter / D / Pennsylvania / Yea; Debbie Stabenow / D / Michigan / Yea; Jon Tester / D / Montana / Yea; John Thune / R / South Dakota / Nay; Mark Udall / D / Colorado / Yea; Tom Udall / D / New Mexico / Yea; David Vitter / R / Louisiana / Nay; George Voinovich / R / Ohio / Yea; Mark Warner / D / Virginia / Yea; Jim Webb / D / Virginia / Yea; Sheldon Whitehouse / D / Rhode Island / Yea; Roger Wicker / R / Mississippi / Nay; Ron Wyden / D / Oregon / Yea

The Senate confirmed Sonia Sotomayor to be an associate justice of the Supreme Court on August 6, 2009, by a 68–31 vote, announced by Senator Al Franken (D-MN) saying, "On this vote, the Yeas are 68 and the Nays are 31." The Senate was composed of 58 Democrats, 2 independents who caucused with the Democrats, and 40 Republicans at the time. All Democrats present (including the Senate's two Independents), along with nine Republicans, voted for her. Democrat Ted Kennedy, a supporter of the nomination, was absent due to ongoing health issues.

President Obama commissioned Sotomayor a justice of the Supreme Court on August 6, the same day as her confirmation. Her swearing-in ceremony took place two days later, on August 8, at the Supreme Court Building. Chief Justice John Roberts administered the prescribed constitutional and judicial oaths of office, at which time she became the 111th justice (99th associate justice) of the Supreme Court.

== See also ==
- Barack Obama Supreme Court candidates
- Demographics of the Supreme Court of the United States
