= Piscataway School Board v. Taxman =

- Court: United States Court of Appeals for the Third Circuit
- Full case name: Sharon Taxman v. Board of Education of Township of Piscataway
- Argued: November 29, 1995
- Reargued: May 14, 1996
- Decided: August 8, 1996
- Citation: 91 F.3d 1547

Case history
- Subsequent history: Settled prior to Supreme Court hearing.

Court membership
- Judges sitting: Dolores Korman Sloviter, Edward R. Becker, Walter King Stapleton, Carol Los Mansmann, Morton Ira Greenberg, Anthony Joseph Scirica, Robert E. Cowen, Richard Lowell Nygaard, Samuel Alito, Jane Richards Roth, Timothy K. Lewis, Theodore McKee, H. Lee Sarokin

Case opinions
- Majority: Mansmann, joined by Becker, Greenberg, Cowen, Nygaard, Alito, Roth
- Concurrence: Stapleton
- Dissent: Sloviter, joined by Lewis, McKee
- Dissent: Scirica, joined by Sloviter
- Dissent: Lewis, joined by McKee
- Dissent: McKee, joined by Sloviter, Lewis

Laws applied
- Title VII of the Civil Rights Act of 1964

Keywords
- Affirmative action

Piscataway School Board v. Taxman, 91 F.3d 1547 (3d Cir. 1996) is a United States labor law case on racial discrimination, that began in 1989 against the Piscataway Township Schools.

== Facts ==
The school board of Piscataway, New Jersey needed to eliminate a teaching position from the high school's Business Education department. Under New Jersey state law, tenured teachers have to be laid off in reverse order of seniority. However, the board faced a problem, as the district's least senior tenured teachers, Sharon Taxman (a white teacher) and Debra Williams (an African-American teacher), had started working at the school on the same day, and thus had equal seniority. In the interest of maintaining racial diversity (Williams was the only African-American teacher in the department, and 50% of the students were minorities), the school board voted to lay off Taxman. Taxman complained to the EEOC, saying that the board had violated Title VII of the Civil Rights Act of 1964, and was given authority to file suit against the board.

== Judgment ==
The United States Court of Appeals for the Third Circuit ruled in favor of Taxman.

== Significance ==
The school board appealed to the United States Supreme Court and a hearing was scheduled for January 1998, but civil rights groups, fearing that the case could lead to the prohibition of affirmative action, provided money for the board to settle the case out of court, so the case was never heard.

Taxman was subsequently rehired, and later reassigned to Conackamack Middle School.

Williams retired at the conclusion of the 2009–2010 school year.

== See also ==
- United States labor law
- Ricci v. DeStefano
- United Steelworkers v. Weber
- Griggs v. Duke Power Co.
