= New York City Civil Service Commission =

New York City government agency

Civil Service Commission
Commission overview
- Jurisdiction: New York City
- Headquarters: 1 Centre Street, New York, New York 10007
- Commission executive: Nancy G. Chaffetz, Commissioner
- Key document: New York City Charter
- Website: www.nyc.gov/csc

The New York City Civil Service Commission (CSC) is the local civil service commission of the government of New York City. It hears appeals by city employees and applicants that have been disciplined or disqualified.

== See also ==
- NYS Civil Service Commission
- NYS Department of Civil Service
- NYC Department of Citywide Administrative Services (DCAS)
