= Karen Lee Torre =

American lawyer

Karen Lee Torre is an American attorney based in New Haven, Connecticut, most notable for litigating the landmark Supreme Court case of Ricci v. DeStefano. The case was argued by Gregory Coleman before the United States Supreme Court.

Torre also represented a female firefighter who sued for sex discrimination in a successful appeal to the United States Court of Appeals for the Second Circuit.

She writes a weekly opinion column for the Connecticut Law Tribune.
