= Forrester v. White =

- Supreme Court of the United States

Argued November 2, 1987 Decided January 12, 1988
- Full case name: Cynthia A. Forrester v. Howard Lee White
- Citations: 484 U.S. 219 (more) 108 S. Ct. 538; 98 L. Ed. 2d 555; 1988 U.S. LEXIS 308

Case history
- Prior: 792 F.2d 647 (7th Cir. 1986); cert. granted, 479 U.S. 1083 (1987).
- Subsequent: 846 F.2d 29 (7th Cir. 1988).

Holding
- Judges do not have absolute immunity in performing administrative functions.

Court membership
- Chief Justice William Rehnquist Associate Justices William J. Brennan Jr. · Byron White; Thurgood Marshall · Harry Blackmun; John P. Stevens · Sandra Day O'Connor; Antonin Scalia

Case opinion
- Majority: O'Connor, joined by unanimous

Laws applied
- 42 U.S.C. § 1983

Forrester v. White, 484 U.S. 219 (1988), was a case decided on by the United States Supreme Court. The case restricted judicial immunity in certain instances.

== Facts ==
Respondent Howard Lee White served as Circuit Judge of the Seventh Judicial Circuit of the State of Illinois and Presiding Judge of the Circuit Court in Jersey County. Under Illinois law, Judge White had the authority to hire adult probation officers, who were removable in his discretion. In addition, as designee of the Chief Judge of the Seventh Judicial Circuit, Judge White had the authority to appoint juvenile probation officers to serve at his pleasure.

In April 1977, Judge White hired petitioner Cynthia A. Forrester as an adult and juvenile probation officer. In July, 1979, Judge White appointed Forrester as Project Supervisor of the Jersey County Juvenile Court Intake and Referral Services Project, a position that carried increased supervisory responsibilities. Judge White demoted Forrester to a nonsupervisory position in the summer of 1980. He discharged her on October 1, 1980.

Forrester filed this lawsuit in the United States District Court for the Southern District of Illinois in July, 1982. She alleged violations of various civil rights statutes based on sexual discrimination. A jury found that Judge White had discriminated against Forrester on account of her sex, in violation of the Equal Protection Clause of the Fourteenth Amendment. The jury awarded her $81,818.80 in compensatory damages under § 1983.

Judge White moved for summary judgment on the ground that he was entitled to "judicial immunity" from a civil damages suit. This motion was granted. Forrester appealed. The Court of Appeals affirmed the "judicial immunity" holding from the lower court. The Supreme Court then granted certiorari.

== Issue ==
Whether a state court judge has absolute immunity from a suit for damages under 42 U.S.C. § 1983 for his decision to dismiss a subordinate court employee. Also, is there a difference in judicial and administrative function when it comes to "judicial immunity."

== Holding ==
Judges have been given judicial immunity to preserve their important governmental function. If judges were personally liable for erroneous decisions, the resulting avalanche of suits, most of them frivolous but vexatious, would provide powerful incentives for judges to avoid rendering decisions likely to provoke such suits. Truly judicial acts, however, must be distinguished from the administrative, legislative, or executive functions that judges may occasionally be assigned by law to perform. Here, the promoting and demoting of aids can be classified as an administrative act, not a judicial one.

Absolute immunity cannot be extended to judges who perform administrative acts. Justice O'Connor applied a "functional" approach under which the nature of the functions entrusted to particular officials is examined in order to evaluate the effect that exposure to particular forms of liability would likely have on the appropriate exercise of those functions.

Administrative acts are indistinguishable from those of an executive branch official responsible for making similar personnel decisions, which, no matter how crucial to the efficient operation of public institutions, are not entitled to absolute immunity from liability in damages under § 1983. O'Connor dismissed the Court of Appeals reasoning that the threat of vexatious lawsuits by disgruntled ex-employees could interfere with the quality of a judge's decisions. She argued that it does not serve to distinguish judges from other public officials who hire and fire subordinates. Neither case should afford absolute immunity towards the actor.
