= Marino v. Ortiz =

- Supreme Court of the United States

Argued November 30, 1987 Decided January 13, 1988
- Full case name: Evelyn Marino, et al., Petitioners v. Juan U. Ortiz, et al.
- Citations: 484 U.S. 301 (more) 108 S. Ct. 586; 98 L. Ed. 2d 629; 1988 U.S. LEXIS 311

Case history
- Prior: Court of Appeals dismissed petitioners' appeal against a settlement agreement, 806 F.2d 1144 (2d Cir. 1986)

Holding
- Only parties to a lawsuit are eligible to appeal from the final judgment

Court membership
- Chief Justice William Rehnquist Associate Justices William J. Brennan Jr. · Byron White; Thurgood Marshall · Harry Blackmun; John P. Stevens · Sandra Day O'Connor; Antonin Scalia

Case opinion
- Per curiam
- Kennedy took no part in the consideration or decision of the case.

Laws applied
- U.S. Const. amend. XIV, Subchapter VI of Chapter 21 of 42 U.S.C. § 2000e [2] et seq.

Marino v. Ortiz, 484 U.S. 301 (1988), was a United States Supreme Court case which resulted from a lawsuit filed by 350 New York City police officers that pitted the Equal Protection Clause of the Fourteenth Amendment against Title VII of the Civil Rights Act of 1964.

The case originated with a lawsuit filed by African American and Hispanic advocacy groups (including the Puerto Rican Legal Defense and Education Fund) alleging that a police sergeant's examination had a disparate impact because the percentage of African Americans and Hispanics that passed the examination was disproportionate to overall percentage. A proposed settlement was reached between the plaintiffs and the city of New York; all of the officers eligible for promotion based on their score would be promoted as well as enough additional minorities to achieve a proportional outcome. The settlement was approved by the United States District Court for the Southern District of New York as a "consent decree" on an interim basis pending a hearing on its fairness and adequacy.

After the ruling but before the hearing, 350 police officers filed suit in the same court alleging that the settlement had deprived them of equal protection of the laws under the Fourteenth Amendment. These officers were not eligible for promotion based on their scores, but they scored at least as high as the lowest scoring minority promoted under the terms of the consent decree. However, they did not seek to become party to the lawsuit that originated the settlement. The consent decree was ultimately approved, and as a result the police officers' lawsuit was dismissed. They appealed both the dismissal of their lawsuit and the consent decree itself.

When oral arguments for the case were held in the fall of 1987, the Court had only eight members. Justice Lewis F. Powell, Jr. had retired from the court earlier in the year, the Senate had rejected Robert Bork's confirmation two months prior, and Anthony Kennedy would not be confirmed until after the decision was announced. This resulted in a gridlock 4–4 tie vote in the matter of whether the officers were correct to file a separate suit challenging the settlement. This being the case, the lower court ruling dismissing the suit was affirmed, but no precedent was set. The next case on the point, Martin v. Wilkes, Justice Kennedy voted that intervention was permissive (F.R.C.P. 24), not mandatory (F.R.C.P. 19) and that it was not an invalid collateral attack on the existing settlement in a similar case. Thereafter Congress amended the rules making intervention in such Title VII cases mandatory.

The Court unanimously agreed that the officers could not appeal the consent decree directly, because "only parties to a lawsuit, or those that properly become parties, may appeal an adverse judgment."

Though the Court's ruling did not directly address the constitutional issues raised, it foreshadowed a legal battle to come. Sonia Sotomayor, a future Supreme Court appointee by Barack Obama, promoted the minority officers' cause while at the Puerto Rican Legal Defense and Education Fund and would later rule against white plaintiffs in a similar case, Ricci v. DeStefano, in a decision that the Supreme Court would overturn by a 5–4 vote.
