= Wygant v. Jackson Board of Education =

- Supreme Court of the United States

Argued November 6, 1985 Decided May 19, 1986
- Full case name: Wendy Wygant, et al. v. Jackson Board of Education, et al.
- Citations: 476 U.S. 267 (more) 106 S. Ct. 1842; 90 L. Ed. 2d 260; 1986 U.S. LEXIS 157; 54 U.S.L.W. 4479; 40 Fair Empl. Prac. Cas. (BNA) 1321; 40 Empl. Prac. Dec. (CCH) ¶ 36,106
- Argument: Oral argument

Case history
- Prior: 546 F. Supp. 1195 (E.D. Mich. 1982); affirmed, 746 F.2d 1152 (6th Cir. 1984); cert. granted, 471 U.S. 1014 (1985).

Holding
- The layoff provision protecting minority teachers from layoffs is unconstitutional.

Court membership
- Chief Justice Warren E. Burger Associate Justices William J. Brennan Jr. · Byron White; Thurgood Marshall · Harry Blackmun; Lewis F. Powell Jr. · William Rehnquist; John P. Stevens · Sandra Day O'Connor

Case opinions
- Plurality: Powell, joined by Burger, Rehnquist; O'Connor (all but part IV)
- Concurrence: White (in judgment)
- Concurrence: O'Connor (in part, in judgment)
- Dissent: Marshall, joined by Brennan, Blackmun
- Dissent: Stevens

Laws applied
- U.S. Const. amend. XIV; Title VII of the Civil Rights Act of 1964

Wygant v. Jackson Board of Education, 476 U.S. 267 (1986), was a case before the United States Supreme Court. It is the seminal case for the "strong-basis-in-evidence standard" for affirmative action programs.

== Background ==
In response to racial tension in a community and its schools, the Board of Education and the teachers union in Jackson, Michigan added a "layoff provision" to their collective bargaining agreement; it required that in the event of layoffs, "teachers with the most seniority ... shall be retained, except that at no time will there be a greater percentage of minority personnel laid off than the current percentage of minority personnel employed at the time of the layoff." This provision was designed to preserve the effects of a hiring policy whose goal had been to increase the percentage of minority teachers in the school system. When layoffs became necessary, the board adhered to the provision, with the result that certain nonminority teachers were laid off while minority teachers with less seniority were retained.

== Procedural history ==
The displaced nonminority teachers sued in federal court, alleging violation of the equal protection clause of the Fourteenth Amendment. The District Court dismissed the teachers' claims, holding that the racial preferences were permissible as an attempt to remedy societal discrimination by providing role models for minority schoolchildren. The United States Court of Appeals for the Sixth Circuit affirmed on similar grounds.

== Decision ==
The United States Supreme Court reversed. Although unable to agree on an opinion, five members of the court agreed that the layoffs were in violation of the equal protection clause. It was also agreed by five members of the court that the equal protection clause does not require a public employer's voluntary affirmative action plan to be preceded by a formal finding that the employer has committed discriminatory acts in the past.

=== Judgment of the court ===
Justice Powell announced the judgment of the court. He expressed the view that

(1) any governmental classification or preference based on racial or ethnic criteria must be justified by a compelling governmental interest, and the means chosen by the government to effectuate its purpose must be narrowly tailored to the achievement of that goal
(2) such means are subject to strict scrutiny and must be tested by a standard more stringent than reasonableness
(3) a school board's interest in providing minority faculty role models for its minority students in an attempt to alleviate the effects of societal discrimination is insufficient to justify racially discriminatory practices in the hiring and layoff of teachers
(4) a public employer like the Board must ensure that, before it embarks on an affirmative-action program, it has convincing evidence that remedial action is warranted. That is, it must have sufficient evidence to justify the conclusion that there has been prior discrimination"
(5) the existence of societal discrimination, without more, is too amorphous a basis for imposing a racially classified legal remedy
(6) in order to remedy the effects of prior racial discrimination, a state may implement a race-based plan under which innocent parties are called upon to bear some of the burden, provided that their share of the burden is relatively light and diffused among society generally
(7) the fact that a race-based layoff plan has been approved by the more senior members of a labor union does not operate to waive the constitutional rights of the most junior nonminority members, who would bear the entire burden of the plan
(8) although the equal protection clause does not require layoffs to be based on strict seniority, it does require the state to meet a heavy burden of justification when it implements a layoff plan based on race
(9) this burden is not met where the plan is not sufficiently narrowly tailored to accomplish otherwise legitimate purposes, and where less intrusive means, such as the adoption of hiring goals, are available to accomplish similar purposes

=== Concurring in part and in the judgment ===
Justice O'Connor stated that the layoff provision was not narrowly tailored to achieve its asserted purpose, on the ground that it was designed to safeguard a hiring goal that was tied to the percentage of minority students in the school district, not to the percentage of qualified minority teachers within the labor pool, and that such a hiring goal itself had no relation to the remedying of employment discrimination.

=== Concurring in the judgment ===
Justice White expressed the view that none of the interests asserted by the board, singly or together, justified the racially discriminatory layoff policy where none of the retained minority teachers was shown to be a victim of any racial discrimination, and that the layoff policy had the same impermissible effect as one that would integrate a work force by discharging whites and hiring blacks until the latter comprised a suitable percentage.

=== Dissents ===
Justice Marshall expressed the view

(1) that the case should have been remanded for further findings of fact as to whether the board's remedial action was warranted
(2) that under the apparent circumstances of the case, the state purpose of preserving the integrity of a hiring policy which sought to achieve diversity and stability for the benefit of all students was sufficient to satisfy the demands of the Constitution
(3) that the layoff provision was a permissible means of achieving this purpose because it allocated the impact of an unavoidable burden, necessitated by external economic conditions, proportionately between two racial groups, and was arrived at through the process of collective bargaining

Justice Stevens expressed the view that

(1) the decision to include more minority teachers in the school system served the valid public purpose of seeking multiethnic representation on the faculty, regardless of whether the board of education was guilty of past racial discrimination
(2) the policy was adopted with fair procedures and given a narrow breadth
(3) it transcended the harm to laid-off nonminority teachers

== Analysis ==
Given the lack of a majority in Wygant, commentators have paired Justice Powell's plurality with Justice O'Connor's concurrence to find three potential conclusions of the case:

(1) employers need not evidence prior discrimination rising to the level of a constitutional or statutory violation before implementing voluntary affirmative action programs
(2) evidence of prior discrimination rising to the level of a prima facie statutory violation will provide a "sufficient basis" for implementing remedial programs
(3) statistical evidence of minority underrepresentation in an employer's ranks is highly relevant to a finding of remedial need
