= Watson v. Fort Worth Bank & Trust =

- Supreme Court of the United States

Argued January 20, 1988 Decided June 29, 1988
- Full case name: Watson v. Fort Worth Bank & Trust
- Citations: 487 U.S. 977 (more) 108 S. Ct. 2777; 101 L. Ed. 2d 827; 56 U.S.L.W. 4922; 47 Fair Empl. Prac. Cas. (BNA) 102; 46 Empl. Prac. Dec. (CCH) ¶ 38,065

Case history
- Prior: 798 F.2d 791 (vacated and remanded)

Holding
- The reasons supporting the use of disparate impact analysis under Title VII apply to subjective employment practices.

Court membership
- Chief Justice William Rehnquist Associate Justices William J. Brennan Jr. · Byron White; Thurgood Marshall · Harry Blackmun; John P. Stevens · Sandra Day O'Connor; Antonin Scalia · Anthony Kennedy

Case opinions
- Majority: O'Connor (Parts I, II-A, II-B, III), joined by Rehnquist, Brennan, White, Marshall, Blackmun, Scalia
- Plurality: O'Connor (Parts II-C, II-D), joined by Rehnquist, White, Scalia
- Concurrence: Blackmun (in part and in judgment), joined by Brennan, Marshall
- Concurrence: Stevens (in judgment)
- Kennedy took no part in the consideration or decision of the case.

Laws applied
- Title VII of the Civil Rights Act of 1964; 42 U.S.C. § 2000e et seq.

Watson v. Fort Worth Bank & Trust, 487 U.S. 977 (1988), is a United States Supreme Court case on United States labor law, concerning proof of disparate treatment under the Civil Rights Act of 1964.

== Facts ==
Plaintiff Watson, an African-American bank teller, applied (on four separate occasions) for a promotion to a supervisory position at the bank.

The bank had not developed precise and formal selection criteria for the positions in question, but instead relied upon the subjective judgment of supervisors who were acquainted with the candidates and the nature of the jobs to be filled.

In all four instances, the supervisors involved in the promotion process were white, and all four times Watson was not selected.

After exhausting her administrative remedies before the Equal Employment Opportunity Commission, Watson filed suit in the United States District Court for the Northern District of Texas. She included allegations that the bank's promotion policies discriminated both against blacks as a class and against her individually, in violation of Title VII of the Civil Rights Act of 1964 (42 USCS 2000e et seq.).

After trial, the District Court, dismissing the teller's individual claims, found that she had failed to make a sufficient showing under applicable evidentiary standards. The United States Court of Appeals for the Fifth Circuit affirmed in relevant part, and expressed the view that the proper framework to apply to a Title VII challenge to an allegedly discretionary promotion system would be disparate treatment analysis (which involves the question whether an employer has, with a discriminatory intent or motive, treated a particular person less favorably than others because of that person's race, color, religion, sex, or national origin) rather than disparate impact analysis (which involves the question whether an employer has engaged in facially neutral employment practices that have significant adverse effects on protected groups, and which usually, in the absence of proof that the employer adopted such practices with a discriminatory intent, focuses on statistical disparities)

== Judgment ==
On certiorari, the United States Supreme Court vacated the judgment of the Court of Appeals and remanded the case for further proceedings.

Seven members of the Court (1) agreed that disparate impact analysis may be applied to allegedly discriminatory subjective or discretionary employment practices, and (2) agreed regarding certain aspects of the evidentiary standards applicable in such cases. In that portion (Parts I, II-A, II-B, and III) of the opinion by Justice O'Connor, it was held that, in a Title VII action, disparate impact analysis may properly be applied to subjective or discretionary employment practices.

=== Plurality opinion ===
The remainder (Parts II-C and II-D) of Justice O'Connor's opinion, joined by three other Justices, expressed the view that

(1) the plaintiff's burden in establishing a prima facie disparate impact case includes the responsibility for isolating and identifying the specific employment practices that are allegedly responsible for any observed statistical disparities in the employer's workforce,
(2) any statistical disparities must be sufficiently substantial that they raise the inference that the practice in question has caused the exclusion of applicants for jobs or promotions because of their membership in a protected group,
(3) it is appropriate to judge the significance or substantiality of numerical disparities on a case-by-case basis,
(4) courts and defendants are not obliged to assume that a plaintiff's statistical evidence is reliable,
(5) the ultimate burden of proving that discrimination against a protected group has been caused by a specific employment practice remains with the plaintiff at all times,
(6) thus, once a plaintiff has made out a prima facie case and an employer has met its burden of producing evidence that its employment practices are based on legitimate business reasons, the plaintiff must show that other tests or selection devices, without a similarly undesirable racial effect, would also serve the employer's legitimate interests, and
(7) employers are not required to introduce formal "validation studies" showing that particular criteria predict actual on-the-job performance.

=== Concurrence in part and in the judgment ===
Justice Blackmun agreed that disparate impact analysis may be applied to claims of discrimination caused by subjective or discretionary selection practices and that the plurality properly characterized the plaintiff's burden of showing that any numerical disparity is significant. He added that

(1) the initial burden of proof in such a case is borne by the plaintiff, who must establish, by some form of numerical showing, that a facially neutral hiring practice selects applicants in a significantly discriminatory pattern,
(2) a plaintiff who successfully establishes a prima facie disparate impact case shifts the burden of proof, not production, to the defendant employer to establish that the employment practice in question is a business necessity,
(3) in order to constitute a business necessity justifying an employment practice producing a disparate impact, an employment criterion must directly relate to the ability to perform the job effectively, rather than bear merely an indirect or minimal relationship,
(4) even where an employer proves that a particular selection process is sufficiently job related, the process may still be determined to be unlawful, if the plaintiff persuades the court that other selection processes that have a lesser discriminatory effect could also suitably serve the employer's business needs,
(5) in assessing an employer's claim of business necessity, a reviewing court may not rely upon its own, or the employer's, sense of what is "normal" as a substitute for a neutral assessment of the evidence presented,
(6) an employer's burden of justification is not lessened simply because the practice relies upon subjective assessments, and
(7) the requirement of specifying the employment practice responsible for a statistical disparity cannot shield from liability an employer whose selection process is so poorly defined that no specific criterion can be connected with the disparate effect.

=== Concurrence in the judgment ===
Justice Stevens argued that

(1) the racially adverse impact of an employer's practice of simply committing employment decisions to the unchecked discretion of a white supervisory corps is subject to the disparate impact analysis test of Griggs v. Duke Power Co. (1971), and
(2) further discussion of evidentiary standards should have been postponed until after the District Court had made appropriate findings concerning the teller's prima facie evidence of disparate impact and the bank's explanation of its practice of giving supervisors discretion in making certain promotions.

== Significance ==
A portion of the holding in Watson was superseded by the 1991 amendments to the Civil Rights Act. See Phillips v. Cohen, 400 F.3d 388, 397–98 (6th Cir. 2005); 42 U.S.C. § 2000e-2(k) (2008).

== See also ==
- US labor law
- List of United States Supreme Court cases, volume 487
- McDonnell Douglas Corp. v. Green (1973)`
