= Strong-basis-in-evidence standard =

In United States law, City of Richmond v. J.A. Croson Co. (1989) established the basic principle that a governmental actor must provide a strong basis in evidence for its conclusion that remedial action is necessary.

The application of this rule has produced conflicting results. Unfortunately, Croson did not offer guidance as to what amount and type of factual showing would provide a strong basis in evidence that discrimination existed in a particular industry.

== Justifying affirmative action by a government entity ==
In order to uphold an affirmative action program under strict scrutiny, there must exist a "strong basis in evidence" of past discrimination by the specific entity to support the conclusion that remedial action is necessary. A generalized assertion that there has been past discrimination in an entire industry will not be enough to justify a program under strict scrutiny. The government must have actively discriminated in its award of contracts or employment or have been a passive participant in a system of racial exclusion practiced by elements of a local industry.

The most probative type of evidence seems to be statistical data showing "gross statistical disparities between the proportion of minorities hired... and the proportion of minorities willing and able to do the work." In government contracting cases, this is often shown through the use of a disparity index, which is a comparison between the share of contracts awarded to minority contractors and the percentage of qualified minority-owned firms in the local population that do such work. In addition, while the combination of "convincing anecdotal and statistical evidence is potent," anecdotal evidence, by itself, will rarely suffice to justify an affirmative action program evaluated under strict scrutiny.
