= United Steelworkers v. Weber =

- Supreme Court of the United States

Argued March 28, 1979 Decided June 27, 1979
- Full case name: United Steelworkers of America, AFL-CIO-CLC v. Weber et al.
- Citations: 443 U.S. 193 (more) 93 S. Ct. 705; 35 L. Ed. 2d 147

Case history
- Prior: Weber v. Kaiser Aluminum & Chem. Corp., 415 F. Supp. 761 (E.D. La. 1976); affirmed, 563 F.2d 216 (5th Cir. 1977); rehearing en banc denied, 571 F.2d 337 (5th Cir. 1978); cert. granted, 439 U.S. 1045 (1978).
- Subsequent: Rehearing denied, 444 U.S. 889 (1979); vacated and remanded, 611 F.2d 132 (5th Cir. 1980).

Holding
- United Steel workers of America did not violate the Civil Rights Act of 1964, as their affirmative action plan attempted to help minority workers and did not prevent other employees from advancing.

Court membership
- Chief Justice Warren E. Burger Associate Justices William J. Brennan Jr. · Potter Stewart; Byron White · Thurgood Marshall; Harry Blackmun · Lewis F. Powell Jr. William Rehnquist · John P. Stevens

Case opinions
- Majority: Brennan, joined by Stewart, White, Marshall, Blackmun
- Concurrence: Blackmun
- Dissent: Burger
- Dissent: Rehnquist, joined by Burger
- Powell and Stevens took no part in the consideration or decision of the case.

Laws applied
- Title VII of the Civil Rights Act of 1964

United Steelworkers of America v. Weber, 443 U.S. 193 (1979), was a case regarding affirmative action in which the United States Supreme Court held that Title VII of the Civil Rights Act of 1964, which prohibits racial discrimination by private employers, does not condemn all private, voluntary, race-conscious affirmative action plans. The Court's decision reversed lower courts' rulings in favor of Brian Weber, whose lawsuit beginning in 1974 challenged his employer's hiring practices.

== Facts ==
Brian Weber was 32 years old, white, and worked as a laboratory assistant at a chemical plant in Gramercy, Louisiana. His company, Kaiser Aluminum and Chemical Corp., had a policy where trainees were selected based on the basis of seniority, with the proviso that at least 50% of the trainees were to be black until the percentage of black skilled craft workers in the plant approximated the percentage of black workers in the local labor force. The plan derived from a collective bargaining agreement with the United Steelworkers of America that covered terms and conditions of employment at 15 Kaiser plants. During the plan's first year of operation, seven black and six white trainees were selected from the plant's production workforce, with certain white production workers passed over despite having more seniority than the selected black workers. Having been so passed over despite his greater seniority, Weber claimed that the filling of craft trainee positions pursuant to the affirmative action program had resulted in junior black employees receiving training in preference to senior white employees, which he argued was discrimination against him and other white employees in violation of §§ 703(a) and (d) of Title VII. The company and the union argued they were implementing a policy to remedy historical disadvantages among black people.

== Judgment ==
=== Lower courts ===
Lower and federal courts supported Weber's claim that Title VII banned all forms of racial discrimination in employment whether against black people or white people.

=== Supreme Court ===
By five to two, the Supreme Court held that the affirmative action plan was lawful. The majority (Brennan, Stewart, White, Marshall and Blackmun JJ) held that Title VII did not prohibit all kinds of affirmative action programs. Section 703(d) of Title VII provides:

It shall be an unlawful employment practice for any employer, labor organization, or joint labor-management committee controlling apprenticeship or other training or retraining, including on-the-job training programs to discriminate against any individual because of his race, color, religion, sex, or national origin in admission to, or employment in, any program established to provide apprenticeship or other training.

The Court held that "Weber's reliance upon a literal construction of the statutory provisions" was "misplaced" since "the plan does not unnecessarily trammel the interests of white employees." They held that the affirmative action plan was transitional in nature and was not intended to maintain racial balance, but simply to eliminate a manifest racial imbalance. The Court declined to set out specific elements of permissible affirmative action plans, saying: "It is not necessary in these cases to define the line of demarcation between permissible and impermissible affirmative action plans; it suffices to hold that the challenged Kaiser-USWA plan falls on the permissible side of the line."

Chief Justice Burger, dissenting, said he would be inclined to vote for the plan if he were a member of Congress and this had been an amendment to the Act, but he was not a member of Congress, and Title VII explicitly prohibited all forms of racial discrimination and the company's practice "unquestionably discriminates on the basis of race against individual employees." Not having affirmative action was agreed to be the position when the Act was passed. He finished by quoting Benjamin Cardozo, The Nature of the Judicial Process (1921) 141, warning to beware of the 'good result' and judges exceeding their authority to get it.

Justice Rehnquist dissented. He quoted George Orwell's book Nineteen Eighty-Four (1949), page 181, where in a sudden jump, mid sentence, the government declares war on Eastasia instead, without blinking, and said this was like the approach to interpretation of the majority:

Thus, by a tour de force reminiscent not of jurists such as Hale, Holmes, and Hughes, but of escape artists such as Houdini, the Court eludes clear statutory language, “uncontradicted” legislative history, and uniform precedent in concluding that employers are, after all, permitted to consider race in making employment decisions.

He cited two senators explaining precisely that the bill would not require a deliberate attempt to maintain a racial balance, because that would be recruiting on the basis of race, which would be unlawful. He explained the Senatorial exchange:

[I]n the only exchange on the Senate floor raising the possibility that an employer might wish to reserve jobs for minorities in order to assist them in overcoming their employment disadvantage, both [Senators] concluded that Title VII prohibits such, in the words of the [Majority Opinion], "voluntary, private, race-conscious efforts to abolish traditional patterns of racial segregation and hierarchy."

== See also ==
- List of United States Supreme Court cases, volume 443
- Griggs v. Duke Power Co. (1971)
- Piscataway v. Taxman (3d Cir. 1996)
- Ricci v. DeStefano (2009)
- Bostock v. Clayton County (2020)
