= List of United States Supreme Court cases, volume 484 =

This is a list of all United States Supreme Court cases from volume 484 of the United States Reports:

Case name	Citation	Date decided
Reagan v. Abourezk	484 U.S. 1	1987
Commissioner v. McCoy	484 U.S. 3	1987
Church of Scientology of Cal. v. IRS	484 U.S. 9	1987
Carpenter v. United States	484 U.S. 19	1987
Paperworkers v. Misco, Inc.	484 U.S. 29	1987
Gwaltney of Smithfield, Ltd. v. Chesapeake Bay Foundation, Inc.	484 U.S. 49	1987
Karcher v. May	484 U.S. 72	1987
Langley v. FDIC	484 U.S. 86	1987
Omni Capital Int'l, Ltd. v. Rudolf Wolff & Co.	484 U.S. 97	1987
NLRB v. Food & Commercial Workers	484 U.S. 112	1987
Mullins Coal Co. of Va. v. Director, Office of Workers' Compensation Programs	484 U.S. 135	1987
Hartigan v. Zbaraz	484 U.S. 171	1987
Vermont v. Cox	484 U.S. 173	1987
Thompson v. Thompson	484 U.S. 174	1988
Deakins v. Monaghan	484 U.S. 193	1988
Yates v. Aiken	484 U.S. 211	1988
Forrester v. White	484 U.S. 219	1988
Lowenfield v. Phelps	484 U.S. 231	1988
Hazelwood School Dist. v. Kuhlmeier	484 U.S. 260	1988
Westfall v. Erwin	484 U.S. 292	1988
Marino v. Ortiz	484 U.S. 301	1988
Honig v. Doe	484 U.S. 305	1988
Carnegie-Mellon Univ. v. Cohill	484 U.S. 343	1988
United Sav. Assn. of Tex. v. Timbers of Inwood Forest Associates, Ltd.	484 U.S. 365	1988
Virginia v. American Booksellers Assn., Inc.	484 U.S. 383	1988
Taylor v. Illinois	484 U.S. 400	1988
United States v. Fausto	484 U.S. 439	1988
Phillips Petroleum Co. v. Mississippi	484 U.S. 469	1988
ETSI Pipeline Project v. Missouri	484 U.S. 495	1988
Department of Navy v. Egan	484 U.S. 518	1988
Laborers Health and Welfare Trust Fund for Northern Cal. v. Advanced Lightweight Concrete Co.	484 U.S. 539	1988
United States v. Owens	484 U.S. 554	1988
