= Kirkland v. New York State Department of Correctional Services =

1983 United States case law

- Court: United States Court of Appeals for the Second Circuit
- Full case name: Edward L. Kirkland, et al v. New York State Department of Correctional Services, et al
- Argued: Feb. 3, 1983
- Decided: June 8, 1983
- Citations: 711 F.2d 1117 (2d Cir. 1983); 32 Fair Empl.Prac.Cas. (BNA) 509; 32 Empl. Prac. Dec. P 33,666

Court membership
- Judges sitting: Wilfred Feinberg, Joseph Edward Lumbard, Amalya Lyle Kearse

Case opinions
- Majority: Lumbard, joined by Feinberg, Kearse

Laws applied
- Title VII of the Civil Rights Act of 1964

In Kirkland v. New York State Department of Correctional Services, 711 F.2d 1117 (2d Cir. 1983), the Second Circuit affirmed the district court's approval of a settlement that determined promotional order based partly on exam results and partly on race-normed adjustments to the exam, after minority employees made a prima facie showing that the test had an adverse impact on minorities. The Court of Appeals noted that "voluntary compliance is a preferred means of achieving Title VII's goal of eliminating employment discrimination", and that requiring a full hearing on the test's job-validity before approving a settlement "would seriously undermine Title VII's preference for voluntary compliance and is not warranted,". Thus, "a showing of a prima facie case of employment discrimination through a statistical demonstration of disproportionate racial impact constitutes a sufficiently serious claim of discrimination to serve as a predicate for a voluntary compromise containing race-conscious remedies."

The case was cited in the District Court opinion for Ricci v. DeStefano, which was decided by the Supreme Court on June 29, 2009.
