= Washington v. Davis =

- Supreme Court of the United States

Argued March 1, 1976 Decided June 7, 1976
- Full case name: Washington, Mayor of Washington, D.C., et al. v. Davis, et al.
- Citations: 426 U.S. 229 (more) 96 S. Ct. 2040; 48 L. Ed. 2d 597; 1976 U.S. LEXIS 154; 12 Fair Empl. Prac. Cas. (BNA) 1415; 11 Empl. Prac. Dec. (CCH) ¶ 10,958

Case history
- Prior: Certiorari to the United States Court of Appeals for the District of Columbia Circuit
- Subsequent: 168 U.S. App. D.C. 42, 512 F.2d 956, reversed.

Holding
- To be unconstitutional, racial discrimination by the government must contain two elements: a discriminatory purpose and a discriminatory impact.

Court membership
- Chief Justice Warren E. Burger Associate Justices William J. Brennan Jr. · Potter Stewart; Byron White · Thurgood Marshall; Harry Blackmun · Lewis F. Powell Jr. William Rehnquist · John P. Stevens

Case opinions
- Majority: White, joined by Burger, Blackmun, Powell, Rehnquist, Stevens; Stewart (Parts I and II)
- Concurrence: Stevens
- Dissent: Brennan, joined by Marshall

Laws applied
- U.S. Const. amend. V Title VII of the Civil Rights Act of 1964

Washington v. Davis, 426 U.S. 229 (1976), was a United States Supreme Court case that established that laws that have a racially discriminatory effect but were not adopted to advance a racially discriminatory purpose are valid under the U.S. Constitution.

== Background ==
In April 1970 two black applicants for positions in the Metropolitan Police Department of the District of Columbia sued officials, claiming that the Department’s hiring procedures were discriminatory, including its use of a test of verbal skills (Test 21), which was failed disproportionately by African Americans. The plaintiffs sued the department, alleging that the test constituted impermissible employment discrimination under both Title VII of the Civil Rights Act of 1964 and the U.S. Constitution.

Since the respondents were filing the action in Washington, D.C., a federal territory, not a state, the constitutional provision the plaintiffs sued under was the Due Process Clause of the Fifth Amendment instead of the Equal Protection Clause of the Fourteenth Amendment. The Equal Protection Clause directly applies only to the states, but the Supreme Court ruled in Bolling v. Sharpe that the Due Process Clause of the Fifth Amendment, which applies to the federal government, contains an equal protection component.

=== District Court decision ===
The District Court examined the police department’s hiring test, known as “Test 21,” which applicants had to pass to enter the police training program. The test measured verbal skills, vocabulary, reading, and comprehension.

The plaintiffs did not argue that officials intentionally discriminated against Black applicants. Instead, they argued that the test had a disproportionately negative impact on Black candidates and was not a measure of success on the job.

The court held that they showed enough evidence to shift the burden to the defendants. However, finding no proof that hiring decisions were based on race rather than ability, the court ruled for the police department.

=== Court of Appeals ===
After losing in the federal district court, the plaintiffs appealed to the Court of Appeals, arguing that the police department’s use of Test 21 violated the Fifth Amendment because it discriminated against Black applicants.

The Court of Appeals relied heavily on Griggs v. Duke Power Co., a case interpreting Title VII of the Civil Rights Act. Under Griggs, employment practices that disproportionately harmed minorities must be sufficiently related to job performance. Applying that reasoning to the Constitution, the court held that discriminatory intent was unnecessary.

The court emphasized that Black applicants failed Test 21 at about four times the rate of white applicants. According to the Court of Appeals, this stark racial disparity alone was enough to establish a constitutional violation unless the police department could prove that the test accurately measured actual job performance. The court found that the department had failed to make that showing.

As a result, the Court of Appeals reversed the lower court and ruled in favor of the plaintiffs. The case was then taken to the Supreme Court in Washington v. Davis.

== Supreme Court ==
The Supreme Court held that under the Constitution's Equal Protection Clause, "a law or other official act, without regard to whether it reflects a racially discriminatory purpose, [is not] unconstitutional solely because it has a racially disproportionate impact." A plaintiff must prove discriminatory motive on the part of the state actor to receive redress under the Constitution, not just discriminatory impact. It held a "disproportionate impact is not irrelevant, but it is not the sole touchstone of an invidious racial discrimination forbidden by the Constitution." Disparities must connect to evidence of discriminatory purpose or discriminatory administration.

Although discriminatory intent is required for a constitutional racial discrimination claim, that intent does not have to be explicitly stated in the law itself. Discriminatory intent can sometimes be inferred from circumstantial evidence, including racial disparities. In some situations—such as the near-total exclusion of Black citizens from juries—the disparity is so extreme that it is difficult to explain except on racial grounds. In those cases, the impact itself can strongly suggest unconstitutional discrimination.

Once plaintiffs establish a strong prima facie case suggesting intentional discrimination, the burden shifts to the state to show that neutral procedures—not racial bias—produced the unequal result.

The Court also examined whether Test 21 had a discriminatory effect. After applying the disparate impact analysis, it held that Test 21 did not have a discriminatory effect on blacks. The Court held that the Court of Appeals had erroneously assumed that the stricter, effects-based "disparate impact" test, under Title VII of the Civil Rights Act of 1964, existed under the Constitution's Equal Protection Clause as well. The Court pointed out that the Washington, D.C., police department had gone to significant lengths to recruit black officers. In the years since the case was brought before the trial court, the ratio of blacks on the police force to blacks in the community had nearly evened out.

Justice White said the following:

As the Court of Appeals understood Title VII, employees or applicants proceeding under it need not concern themselves with the employer's possibly discriminatory purpose but instead may focus solely on the racially differential impact of the challenged hiring or promotion practices. This is not the constitutional rule. We have never held that the constitutional standard for adjudicating claims of invidious racial discrimination is identical to the standards applicable under Title VII, and we decline to do so today.

[...]

Nor on the facts of the case before us would the disproportionate impact of Test 21 warrant the conclusion that it is a purposeful device to discriminate against Negroes and hence an infringement of the constitutional rights of respondents as well as other black applicants. As we have said, the test is neutral on its face and rationally may be said to serve a purpose the Government is constitutionally empowered to pursue. Even agreeing with the District Court that the differential racial effect of Test 21 called for further inquiry, we think the District Court correctly held that the affirmative efforts of the Metropolitan Police Department to recruit black officers, the changing racial composition of the recruit classes and of the force in general, and the relationship of the test to the training program negated any inference that the Department discriminated on the basis of race or that "a police officer qualifies on the color of his skin rather than ability.

Justices Brennan and Marshall dissented. They would have held that the constitutional questions would not be reached and that the question should have first been decided on statutory grounds in the employees' favor.

== Significance ==
The purpose-based standard made it much more difficult for plaintiffs to prevail in discrimination suits arising under the Constitution. In Griggs v Duke Power Co., 401 US 424 (1971), the Supreme Court held that evidence of disparate impact of an employment practice can be used for a claim of employment discrimination, if the business cannot demonstrate that the employment requirements "reasonably related" to the job for which the test is required. In the case in question, Duke Power Co. had, on July 2, 1965, instituted IQ tests on a broad basis as a requirement to transfer into several entire departments of the company, regardless of the actual requirements of any specific position. Employment requirements that have a disparate impact are allowable if they relate to bona fide requirements of the actual position in question.

In 1991, Congress amended Title VII in order to codify the "disparate impact" test.

In the years following Washington, the Court held that laws must be motivated by purposeful discrimination, not just have a discriminatory effect, to be unconstitutional. In Personnel Administrator of Massachusetts v Feeney 442 US 256 (1979) held legislation obnoxious to the Equal Protection Clause is passed "because of, not merely in spite of, its adverse effects upon an identifiable group."

In Mobile v. Bolden, the Court cited Washington in holding that the Fifteenth Amendment, as well as its implementation legislation such as the Voting Rights Acts, prohibited racially discriminatory voting laws only if they were adopted with a racially discriminatory purpose. Shortly afterwards, in 1982, Congress passed, and President Reagan signed into law, amendments to the Voting Rights Act which countermanded the ruling in Mobile and specifically directed that voter discrimination cases be judged according to discriminatory effect.

== See also ==
- List of United States Supreme Court cases, volume 426
