= Hayden v. County of Nassau =

American legal case

- Court: United States Court of Appeals for the Second Circuit
- Full case name: William Hayden, et al v. County of Nassau, et al
- Argued: March 12, 1999
- Decided: June 9, 1999
- Citation: 180 F.3d 42 (2d Cir. 1999)

Court membership
- Judges sitting: James Lowell Oakes, John M. Walker Jr., Damon J. Keith (6th Cir.)

Case opinions
- Majority: Keith, joined by Oakes, Walker

Laws applied
- Equal Protection Clause; Title VII of the Civil Rights Act of 1964

In Hayden v. County of Nassau, 180 F.3d 42 (2d Cir. 1999), the Second Circuit affirmed the district court's dismissal of a suit brought by White and Latino police officers alleging violations of the Equal Protection Clause and Title VII of the Civil Rights Act of 1964.

== Background ==
To comply with a consent decree, Nassau County redesigned its entrance examinations for police officers to eliminate or reduce the adverse impact the test had on minority candidates. The officers contended that the department's entrance exam, which had been intentionally designed to minimize adverse impact on black candidates, discriminated against them.

== Opinion of the court ==
The Second Circuit rejected the Equal Protection claims, because the test was facially neutral, administered and scored in the same way for all candidates, was not designed with an intent to discriminate, and had not resulted in an adverse impact upon the plaintiff class of white, Latino and female applicants. The court emphasized the distinction between the County's legitimate intent to minimize the discriminatory impact of the test on black applicants, and an intent to discriminate against non-black applicants. The court explained that the objective of "designing an entrance exam which would diminish the adverse impact on black applicants . . . in and of itself [] does not constitute a 'racial' classification"; "although Nassau County was necessarily conscious of race in redesigning its entrance exam, it treated all persons equally in the administration of the exam".

The court also rejected the plaintiffs' argument that they were discriminated against because they would have received higher scores if certain sections had not been removed from the test, pointing out that even without these sections the plaintiffs still scored higher, on average, than the black applicants who were presumed to have benefited from the revised exam. The Second Circuit stated that "where an exam that discriminates against a group or groups of persons is reviewed, studied and changed in order to eliminate, or at the very least, alleviate such discrimination, there is a complete absence of intentional discrimination." "[E]ven in the absence of specific and identified discrimination, nothing in our jurisprudence precludes the use of race-neutral means to improve racial and gender representation. . . . . [T]he intent to remedy the disparate impact of the prior exams is not equivalent to an intent to discriminate against non-minority applicants.'"

The Second Circuit rejected the Title VII claims for the same reasons as the equal protection challenges. "The legislative history of the statute . . . confirms that it intended to prohibit 'race norming' and other methods of using different cut-offs for different races or altering scores based on race. In the case before us, the 1994 exam was scored in the same manner for all applicants; no differential cutoffs were employed. Thus, appellants fail to adequately allege a claim under § [703(l)]."
