= City of Richmond v. J.A. Croson Co. =

- Supreme Court of the United States

Argued October 5, 1988 Decided January 23, 1989
- Full case name: City of Richmond v. J.A. Croson Co.
- Docket no.: 87-998
- Citations: 488 U.S. 469 (more) 109 S. Ct. 706; 102 L. Ed. 2d 854; 1989 U.S. LEXIS 579
- Opinion announcement: Opinion announcement

Case history
- Prior: J.A. Croson Co. v. City of Richmond, 779 F.2d 181 (4th Cir. 1985), cert. granted, judgment vacated, 478 U.S. 1016 (1986); on remand, 822 F.2d 1355 (4th Cir. 1987); probable jurisdiction noted, 484 U.S. 1058 (1988).

Holding
- Racial quotas for awarding government contracts are not justified by general statistical evidence of inequality. The city did not investigate any race-neutral methods to correct the imbalance, and its 30% goal did not correspond to any actual measured injury. Strict scrutiny is warranted, and Richmond's law fails the test.

Court membership
- Chief Justice William Rehnquist Associate Justices William J. Brennan Jr. · Byron White; Thurgood Marshall · Harry Blackmun; John P. Stevens · Sandra Day O'Connor; Antonin Scalia · Anthony Kennedy

Case opinions
- Majority: O'Connor (Parts I, III–B, and IV), joined by Rehnquist, White, Stevens, Kennedy
- Plurality: O'Connor (Part II), joined by Rehnquist, White
- Plurality: O'Connor (Parts III–A and V), joined by Rehnquist, White, Kennedy
- Concurrence: Stevens (in part)
- Concurrence: Kennedy (in part)
- Concurrence: Scalia (in judgment)
- Dissent: Marshall, joined by Brennan, Blackmun
- Dissent: Blackmun, joined by Brennan

Laws applied
- U.S. Const. amend. XIV; Richmond, Va., City Code, § 12-156(a) (1985)

City of Richmond v. J.A. Croson Co., 488 U.S. 469 (1989), was a case in which the United States Supreme Court held that the minority set-aside program of Richmond, Virginia, which gave preference to minority business enterprises (MBE) in the awarding of municipal contracts, was unconstitutional under the Equal Protection Clause. The Court found that the city failed to identify both the need for remedial action and that other non-discriminatory remedies would be insufficient.

Croson involved a minority set-aside program in the awarding of municipal contracts. Richmond, with a black population of just over 50 percent, had set a 30 percent goal in the awarding of city construction contracts, based on its findings that local, state, and national patterns of discrimination had resulted in all but complete lack of access for minority-owned businesses. The evidence that was introduced included: a statistical study indicating that, although the city's population was 50% black, only 0.67% of its prime construction contracts had been awarded to minority businesses in recent years; figures establishing that a variety of local contractors' associations had virtually no MBE members; the city's counsel's conclusion that the Plan was constitutional under Fullilove v. Klutznick, 448 U.S. 448; and the statements of Plan proponents indicating that there had been widespread racial discrimination in the local, state, and national construction industries. Pursuant to the Plan, the city adopted rules requiring individualized consideration of each bid or request for a waiver of the 30% set-aside, and providing that a waiver could be granted only upon proof that sufficient qualified MBE's were unavailable or unwilling to participate The Supreme Court stated:

We, therefore, hold that the city has failed to demonstrate a compelling interest in apportioning public contracting opportunities on the basis of race. To accept Richmond's claim that past societal discrimination alone can serve as the basis for rigid racial preferences would be to open the door to competing claims for "remedial relief" for every disadvantaged group. The dream of a Nation of equal citizens in a society where race is irrelevant to personal opportunity and achievement would be lost in a mosaic of shifting preferences based on inherently unmeasurable claims of past wrongs. [Citing Regents of the University of California v. Bakke]. Courts would be asked to evaluate the extent of the prejudice and consequent harm suffered by various minority groups. Those whose societal injury is thought to exceed some arbitrary level of tolerability then would be entitled to preferential classification. We think such a result would be contrary to both the letter and the spirit of a constitutional provision whose central command is equality.

== See also ==
- List of United States Supreme Court cases, volume 488
- List of United States Supreme Court cases
- Lists of United States Supreme Court cases by volume
