= Griggs v. Duke Power Co. =

- Supreme Court of the United States

Argued December 14, 1970 Decided March 8, 1971
- Full case name: Griggs et al. v. Duke Power Co.
- Citations: 401 U.S. 424 (more) 91 S. Ct. 849; 28 L. Ed. 2d 158; 1971 U.S. LEXIS 134
- Argument: Oral argument

Case history
- Prior: Reversed in part, 420 F.2d 1225 (4th Cir. 1970). Certiorari to the United States Court of Appeals for the Fourth Circuit, granted.

Holding
- Broad aptitude tests used in hiring practices that disparately impact ethnic minorities must be reasonably related to the job.

Court membership
- Chief Justice Warren E. Burger Associate Justices Hugo Black · William O. Douglas; John M. Harlan II · William J. Brennan Jr. Potter Stewart · Byron White; Thurgood Marshall · Harry Blackmun

Case opinion
- Majority: Burger, joined by unanimous
- Brennan took no part in the consideration or decision of the case.

Laws applied
- Title VII of the Civil Rights Act of 1964

Griggs v. Duke Power Co., 401 U.S. 424 (1971), was a court case argued before the Supreme Court of the United States on December 14, 1970. It concerned employment discrimination and the disparate impact theory, and was decided on March 8, 1971. It is generally considered the first case of its type.

The Supreme Court ruled that the company's employment requirements did not pertain to applicants' ability to perform the job, and so were unintentionally discriminating against black employees. The judgment famously held that "Congress has now provided that tests or criteria for employment or promotion may not provide equality of opportunity merely in the sense of the fabled offer of milk to the stork and the fox."

== Facts ==
In the 1950s, Duke Power's Dan River Steam Station in North Carolina had a policy restricting black employees to its "Labor" department, where the highest-paying position paid less than the lowest-paying position in the four other departments. In 1955, the company added the requirement of a high school diploma for employment in any department other than Labor, and offered to pay two-thirds of the high-school training tuition for employees without a diploma.

On July 2, 1965, the day the Civil Rights Act of 1964 took effect, Duke Power added two employment tests, which would allow employees without high-school diplomas to transfer to higher-paying departments. These two tests were the Bennett Mechanical Comprehension Test, a test of mechanical aptitude, and the Wonderlic Cognitive Ability Test, a cognitive ability test created in 1939.

White people were almost ten times more likely than black people to meet these new employment and transfer requirements. According to the 1960 United States census, while 34% of white males in North Carolina had high-school diplomas, only 18% of black males did. The disparities of aptitude tests were far greater; with the cutoffs set at the median for high-school graduates, 58% of white people passed, compared to 6% of black people.

== Judgments ==
=== First instance and appeal ===
The federal district court initially ruled in favor of Duke Power, accepting that Duke Power's former racial discrimination policy has been abandoned. On referral to the Fourth Circuit Court of Appeals, the appellate court upheld the ruling that the intelligence tests administered by Duke Power did not reflect any discriminatory intention, and so they were not unlawful under the Civil Rights Act.

=== Supreme Court ===
The Supreme Court ruled that under Title VII of the Civil Rights Act of 1964, if such tests disparately impact ethnic minority groups, businesses must demonstrate that such tests are "reasonably related" to the job for which the test is required. Because Title VII was passed pursuant to Congress's power under the Commerce Clause of the Constitution, the disparate impact test later articulated by the Supreme Court in Washington v. Davis, 426 US 229 (1976) is inapplicable. (The Washington v. Davis test for disparate impact is used in constitutional Equal Protection Clause cases, while Title VII's prohibition on disparate impact is a statutory mandate.)

As such, Title VII of the Civil Rights Act prohibits employment tests (when used as a decisive factor in employment decisions) that are not a "reasonable measure of job performance," regardless of the absence of actual intent to discriminate. Since the aptitude tests involved, and the high school diploma requirement, were broad-based and not directly related to the jobs performed, Duke Power's employee transfer procedure was found by the Court to be in violation of the Act.

Chief Justice Burger wrote the majority opinion.

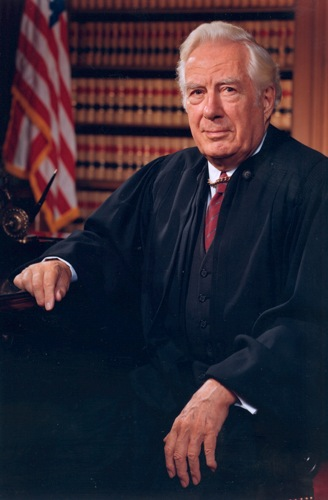
Chief Justice Burger

The Court of Appeals' opinion, and the partial dissent, agreed that, on the record in the present case, "whites register far better on the Company's alternative requirements" than Negroes. This consequence would appear to be directly traceable to race. Basic intelligence must have the means of articulation to manifest itself fairly in a testing process. Because they are Negroes, petitioners have long received inferior education in segregated schools, and this Court expressly recognized these differences in Gaston County v. United States, 395 U.S. 285 (1969). There, because of the inferior education received by Negroes in North Carolina, this Court barred the institution of a literacy test for voter registration on the ground that the test would abridge the right to vote indirectly on account of race. Congress did not intend by Title VII, however, to guarantee a job to every person regardless of qualifications. In short, the Act does not command that any person be hired simply because he was formerly the subject of discrimination, or because he is a member of a minority group. Discriminatory preference for any group, minority or majority, is precisely and only what Congress has proscribed. What is required by Congress is the removal of artificial, arbitrary, and unnecessary barriers to employment when the barriers operate invidiously to discriminate on the basis of racial or other impermissible classification.

Congress has now provided that tests or criteria for employment or promotion may not provide equality of opportunity merely in the sense of the fabled offer of milk to the stork and the fox. On the contrary, Congress has now required that the posture and condition of the job seeker be taken into account. It has—to resort again to the fable—provided that the vessel in which the milk is proffered be one all seekers can use. The Act proscribes not only overt discrimination, but also practices that are fair in form, but discriminatory in operation. The touchstone is business necessity. If an employment practice which operates to exclude Negroes cannot be shown to be related to job performance, the practice is prohibited.

On the record before us, neither the high school completion requirement nor the general intelligence test is shown to bear a demonstrable relationship to successful performance of the jobs for which it was used. Both were adopted, as the Court of Appeals noted, without meaningful study of their relationship to job performance ability. Rather, a vice-president of the Company testified, the requirements were instituted on the Company's judgment that they generally would improve the overall quality of the workforce.

The evidence, however, shows that employees who have not completed high school or taken the tests have continued to perform satisfactorily, and make progress in departments for which the high school and test criteria are now used. The promotion record of present employees who would not be able to meet the new criteria thus suggests the possibility that the requirements may not be needed even for the limited purpose of preserving the avowed policy of advancement within the Company. In the context of this case, it is unnecessary to reach the question whether testing requirements that take into account capability for the next succeeding position or related future promotion might be utilized upon a showing that such long-range requirements fulfill a genuine business need. In the present case, the Company has made no such showing.

The Court of Appeals held that the Company had adopted the diploma and test requirements without any "intention to discriminate against Negro employees". 420 F.2d at 1232. We do not suggest that either the District Court or the Court of Appeals erred in examining the employer's intent; but good intent or absence of discriminatory intent does not redeem employment procedures or testing mechanisms that operate as "built-in headwinds" for minority groups and are unrelated to measuring job capability.

The Company's lack of discriminatory intent is suggested by special efforts to help the undereducated employees through Company financing of two-thirds the cost of tuition for high school training. But Congress directed the thrust of the Act to the consequences of employment practices, not simply the motivation. More than that, Congress has placed on the employer the burden of showing that any given requirement must have a manifest relationship to the employment in question.

The facts of this case demonstrate the inadequacy of broad and general testing devices, as well as the infirmity of using diplomas or degrees as fixed measures of capability. History is filled with examples of men and women who rendered highly effective performance without the conventional badges of accomplishment in terms of certificates, diplomas, or degrees. Diplomas and tests are useful servants, but Congress has mandated the common sense proposition that they are not to become masters of reality.

== Significance ==
Griggs v. Duke Power Co. also held that the employer had the burden of producing and proving the business necessity of a test. However, in Wards Cove Packing Co. v. Atonio (1989), the Court reduced the employer's (Wards Cove Packing Company) burden to producing only evidence of business justification. In 1991, the Civil Rights Act was amended to overturn that portion of the Wards Cove decision—although legislators included language designed to exempt the Wards Cove company itself.

David Frum writes that Griggs redefined discrimination from meaning unequal treatment to meaning failure to make special allowances for the historically imposed circumstances of protected groups.

Although private employers with 15 or more employees are subject to Title VII of the Civil Rights Act, it was held in Washington v. Davis (1976) that the disparate impact doctrine does not apply to the equal protection requirement of the Fifth and Fourteenth Amendments. Thus, lawsuits against public employers may be barred by sovereign immunity.

== See also ==
- Affirmative action
- Diversity, Equity, and Inclusion
- US labor law
- Intelligence and public policy
- List of United States Supreme Court cases, volume 401
- Ricci v. DeStefano
- United Steelworkers v. Weber
- Piscataway v. Taxman
