= New York State Civil Service Commission =

Civil Service Commission

Commission overview
- Jurisdiction: New York
- Commission executive: Timothy Hogues, President
- Key document: Civil Service Law
- Website: www.cs.ny.gov

The New York State Civil Service Commission is a New York state government body that adopts rules that govern the state civil service; oversees the operations of municipal civil service commissions and city and county personnel officers; hears appeals on examination qualifications, examination ratings, position classifications, pay grade determinations, disciplinary actions, and the use of preferred lists; and requests to continue the employment of individuals who are retired. Its regulations are compiled in title 4 of the New York Codes, Rules and Regulations.

It is composed of three members: the president of the commission, who is also the head of the Department of Civil Service, and two commissioners. Members are appointed by the governor with the advice and consent of the Senate for terms of six years, and not more than two of the three can be members of the same political party.

== See also ==
- Bushey v. New York State Civil Service Commission
- New York City Civil Service Commission
- New York State Department of Labor
