= Housing discrimination in the United States =

Housing discrimination in the United States refers to the historical and current barriers, policies, and biases that prevent equitable access to housing. Housing discrimination became more pronounced after the abolition of slavery in 1865, typically as part of Jim Crow laws that enforced racial segregation. The federal government didn't begin to take action against these laws until 1917, when the Supreme Court struck down ordinances prohibiting African-Americans from occupying or owning buildings in majority-white neighborhoods in Buchanan v. Warley. However, the federal government as well as local governments continued to be directly responsible for housing discrimination through redlining and race-restricted covenants until the Civil Rights Act of 1968.

This Act included legislation known as the Fair Housing Act, which made it unlawful for a landlord to discriminate against or prefer a potential tenant based on their race, color, religion, gender, or national origin, when advertising or negotiating the sale or rental of housing. Such protections have also been extended to other "protected classes" including disabilities and familial status. Despite these efforts, studies have shown that housing discrimination still exists and that the resulting segregation has led to wealth, educational, and health disparities. The prevalence of housing discrimination and redlining in the United States has led to wide-ranging impacts upon various aspects of the structure of society, such as housing inequality and educational inequality. These phenomena can be seen through the lens of critical race theory as examples of systemic racism.

The Fair Housing Act, which was part of the Civil Rights Act, made it illegal for landlords to discriminate against potential tenants based on their race, color, religion, sex, or national origin when selling or renting housing. Protections have since been extended to additional "protected classes" including individuals with disabilities and families with children. Despite these legal protections, housing discrimination persists, contributing to disparities in wealth, education, and health outcomes. Scholars have noted that government policies promoting homeownership historically favored middle and upper income white families while excluding minorities and low income Americans, reinforcing patterns of inequality and limiting access to wealth building opportunities.

== History ==
After the end of the Civil War and the abolition of slavery, Jim Crow laws were introduced. These laws led to the discrimination of racial and ethnic minorities, especially African Americans. While Jim Crow laws spread throughout the South, more subtle discriminatory practices were implemented in the North. Between 1900 and 1920, there was growth in the African American population, many of whom migrated to the North as part of the Great Migration. This led to a reaction by whites in Northern cities, fueling housing discrimination and residential segregation, which had previously not been as visible. Institutional tools such as zoning and racially restricted covenants were used as a way to stop the spread of African Americans into white neighborhoods. In 1926, racially restrictive covenants were upheld by the Supreme Court case Corrigan v. Buckley. After this ruling, these covenants became popular across the country as a way to guarantee white, homogeneous neighborhoods. In Village of Euclid v. Ambler Realty Co. in 1926, the Supreme Court also upheld exclusionary zoning.

Fifteen state courts obeyed ordinances that enforced the denial of housing to African American and other minority groups in white-zoned areas. In the 1917 Supreme Court case Buchanan v. Warley, the court ruled that a Louisville, Kentucky ordinance prohibiting blacks from owning or occupying buildings in a majority-white neighborhood, and vice versa, was unconstitutional. Following this decision, however, nineteen states began legally supporting "covenants," or agreements, between property owners to not rent or sell any homes to racial or ethnic minorities. Although the covenants were later made illegal in 1948, they were still allowed to be in private deeds.

The Federal Housing Administration (FHA) was responsible for much of the housing discrimination in the US due to explicit racially discriminatory policies. The FHA believed allowing Black Americans to live in white neighborhood would decrease the property value. This justification, however, was disproven as Black Americans were willing to pay higher prices to live in those neighborhoods. The FHA was also responsible for denying mortgage insurance to Black neighborhoods, a practice known as redlining. This entailed categorizing neighborhoods according to risk level for lending. This risk level depended largely upon the racial composition of these neighborhoods. The FHA's Underwriting Manual explicitly encouraged "prohibition of the occupancy of properties except by the race for which they were intended." Encouraged by the FHA, developers established deed restrictions to maintain white neighborhoods.

Another discriminatory practice was called blockbusting. Blockbusting was when real estate agents persuaded owners to sell property cheaply because of the fear of people of another ethnic or social group moving into the neighborhood, and then profiting by reselling at a higher price to actual minorities. According to: Chicago fed.org, within one neighborhood in Baltimore, blockbusters bought two-thirds of all properties and 96% of the neighborhood’s population in 1950 had relocated by 1970. They identified reports of blockbusting in 45 of the 60 largest cities in the U.S. during the 1950s and 1960s.

The GI bill allowed many veterans to become homeowners, leading to a housing boom. However, this bill did not support Black veterans in the same way because mortgages and loans were not provided by the United States Department of Veterans Affairs but by private mortgage lenders who often discriminated through redlining. Levittown was a neighborhood built to provide affordable housing for returning veterans from World War II, but the developer refused to allow people of color to live there. The FHA backed this decision by authorizing loans and providing racially-restricted deeds.

It was not until the Fair Housing Act, enacted as Title VIII of the Civil Rights Act of 1968, that the federal government made its first concrete steps to deem all types of housing discrimination unconstitutional. The act explicitly prohibits housing discrimination practices common at the time, including filtering information about a home's availability, racial steering, blockbusting, and redlining.

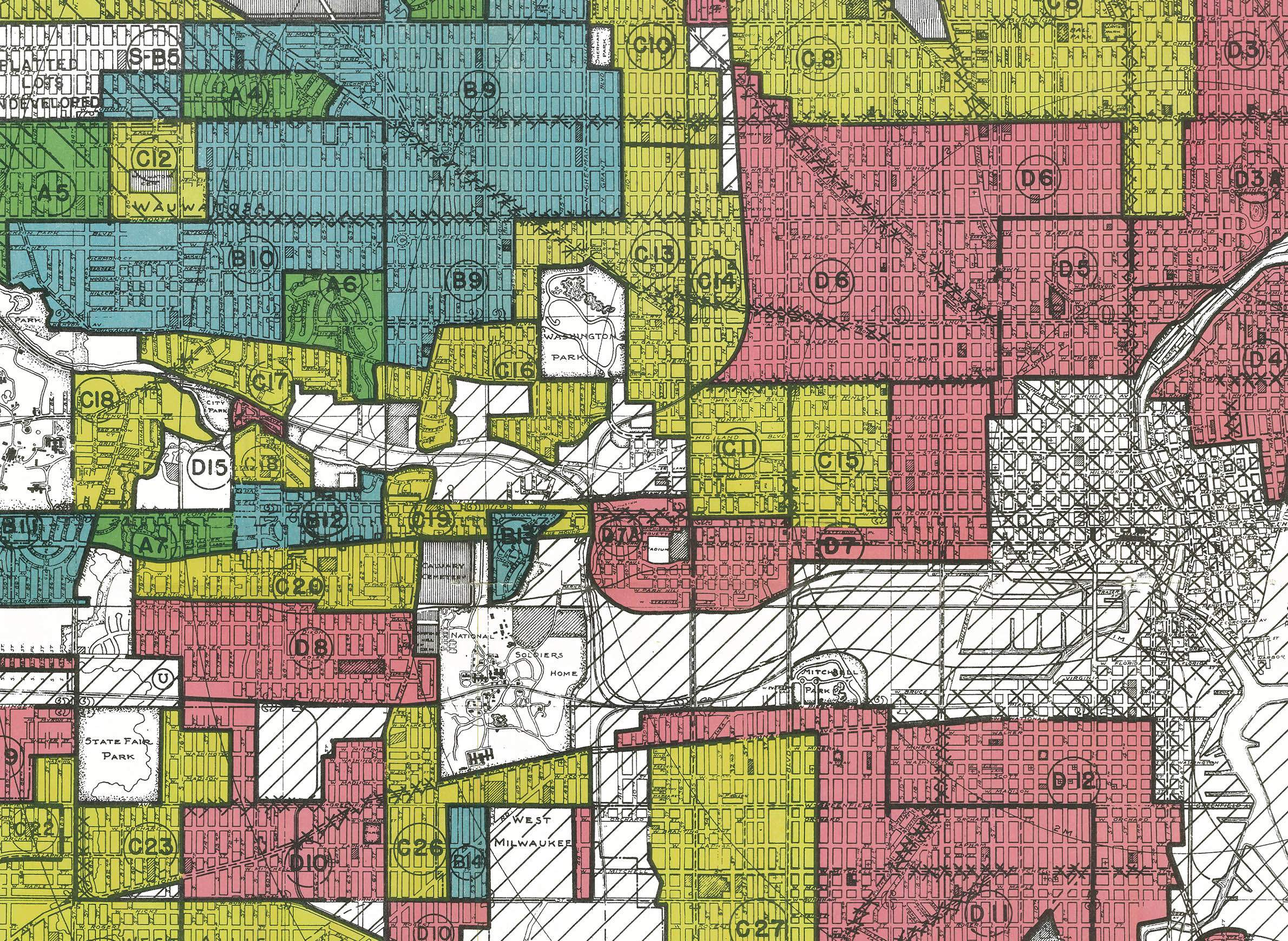
Redlining in Milwaukee

=== Fair Housing Act ===
The Fair Housing Act was passed at the urging of President Lyndon B. Johnson. Congress passed the federal Fair Housing Act (codified at 42 U.S.C. 3601-3619, penalties for violation at 42 U.S.C. 3631) Title VIII of the Civil Rights Act of 1968 only one week after the assassination of Martin Luther King Jr.

The Fair Housing Act introduced meaningful federal enforcement mechanisms.

It outlawed:

- Refusal to sell or rent a dwelling to any person because of race, color, religion, sex, or national origin.
- Discrimination based on race, color, religion or national origin in the terms, conditions or privilege of the sale or rental of a dwelling.
- Advertising the sale or rental of a dwelling indicating preference of discrimination based on race, color, religion or national origin.
- Coercing, threatening, intimidating, or interfering with a person's enjoyment or exercise of housing rights based on discriminatory reasons or retaliating against a person or organization that aids or encourages the exercise or enjoyment of fair housing rights.

When the Fair Housing Act was first enacted, it prohibited discrimination only on the basis of race, color, religion, sex, and national origin. In 1988, disability and familial status (the presence or anticipated presence of children under 18 in a household) were added (further codified in the Americans with Disabilities Act of 1990). In certain circumstances, the law allows limited exceptions for discrimination based on sex, religion, or familial status.

The United States Department of Housing and Urban Development is the federal executive department with the statutory authority to administer and enforce the Fair Housing Act. The Secretary of Housing and Urban Development has delegated fair housing enforcement and compliance activities to HUD's Office of Fair Housing and Equal Opportunity (FHEO) and HUD's Office of General Counsel. FHEO is one of the United States' largest federal civil rights agencies. It has a staff of more than 600 people located in 54 offices around the United States. As of June 2014, the head of FHEO is Assistant Secretary for Fair Housing and Equal Opportunity Gustavo Velasquez, whose appointment was confirmed on June 19, 2014.

Individuals who believe they have experienced housing discrimination can file a complaint with FHEO at no charge. FHEO funds and has working agreements with many state and local governmental agencies where "substantially equivalent" fair housing laws are in place. Under these agreements, FHEO refers complaints to the state or locality where the alleged incident occurred, and those agencies investigate and process the case instead of FHEO. This is known as FHEO's Fair Housing Assistance Program (or "FHAP").

There is also a network of private, non-profit fair housing advocacy organizations throughout the country. Some are funded by FHEO's Fair Housing Initiatives Program (or "FHIP"), and some operate with private donations or grants from other sources.

However, victims of housing discrimination need not go through HUD or any other governmental agency to pursue their rights. The Fair Housing Act confers jurisdiction to hear cases on federal district courts. The United States Department of Justice also has jurisdiction to file cases on behalf of the United States where there is a pattern and practice of discrimination or where HUD has found discrimination in a case and either party elects to go to federal court instead of continuing in the HUD administrative process.

The Fair Housing Act applies to landlords renting or leasing space in their primary residence only if the residence contains living quarters occupied or intended to be occupied by three or more other families living independently of each other, such as an owner-occupied rooming house.

The Fair Housing Act is a U.S. federal law designed to protect individuals and families from discrimination in housing-related activities, including the sale, rental, financing, and advertising of homes. Amended in 1988, the Act prohibits discrimination based on race, color, religion, sex, disability, family status, and national origin. Initially introduced to Congress in 1966, the Act aimed to tackle racial discrimination in housing transactions. Despite multiple reviews by both the House of Representatives and the Senate over the following two years, it failed to secure enough support for passage. A key advocate for the bill was Martin Luther King Jr., who actively participated in open housing marches in Chicago during the 1960s. Following King's assassination on April 4, 1968, President Lyndon B. Johnson urged Congress to pass the legislation as a tribute to the fallen civil rights leader before his funeral.

==== Enforcement ====
The Fair Housing Act gave the Department of Housing and Urban Development the power of enforcement, but the enforcement mechanisms were weak. The Fair Housing Act has been strengthened since its adoption in 1968, but enforcement continues to be a concern among housing advocates. According to a 2010 evaluation of Analysis of Impediments (AI) reports done by the Government Accountability Office, enforcement is particularly inconsistent across local jurisdictions. There have been calls for HUD to use disparate impact as a measure of housing discrimination. HUD's disparate impact rule was strengthened in 2013 and upheld in a court case in 2015. However, in 2020, HUD issued its final disparate impact rule, which shifted the burden of proof of discrimination to the victims of housing discrimination.

Since the Fair Housing Act was enacted in 1968, the nation has made notable strides in addressing some of the most blatant forms of housing discrimination. Nevertheless, various forms of housing discrimination continue to exist today. The Fair Housing Act offers several pathways for individuals who believe they have experienced unlawful housing discrimination to seek recourse. These include filing a private lawsuit in state or federal court or submitting an administrative complaint to the Department of Housing and Urban Development (HUD) or a relevant state or local agency. Additionally, a wide network of fair housing organizations at the state and local levels, along with HUD and the Department of Justice (DOJ), can also initiate fair housing complaints. The statute of limitations for filing a complaint under the Fair Housing Act differs based on whether the complaint is submitted to a court, HUD, or a state or local agency. If an individual files an administrative complaint with HUD, the time limit for pursuing a civil action is paused while the administrative process is ongoing.

=== Subsequent developments ===
In 1968, the Kerner Commission report was released, which called for investment in housing to reduce residential segregation. The federal government has passed other initiatives in addition to the Fair Housing Act of 1968. The Equal Credit Opportunity Act of 1974 and Community Reinvestment Act of 1977 helped with discrimination in mortgage lending and lenders' problems with credit needs. The Fair Housing Amendments Act of 1988 was passed to give the federal government the power to enforce the original Fair Housing Act to correct past problems with enforcement. The amendment established a system of administrative law judges to hear cases brought to them by the United States Department of Housing and Urban Development and to levy fines. Because of the relationship between housing discrimination cases and private agencies, the federal government passed the two initiatives. The Fair Housing Assistance Program of 1984 was passed to assist public agencies with processing complaints, and the Fair Housing Initiatives program of 1986 supported private and public fair housing agencies in their activities, such as auditing. Between 1990 and 2001, these two programs have resulted in over one thousand housing discrimination lawsuits and over $155 million in financial recovery. However, the lawsuits and financial recoveries generated from fair housing discrimination cases only scratches the surface of all instances of discrimination. Silverman and Patterson concluded that the underfunding and poor implementation of federal, state and local policies designed to address housing discrimination resulted in less than 1% of all instances of discrimination being addressed. Moreover, they found that local nonprofits and administrators responsible for enforcing fair housing laws had a tendency to downplay discrimination based on family status and race when designing implementation strategies.

Some states have passed laws on top of the Fair Housing Act that also outlaw housing discrimination based on the source of funding, particularly to combat landlords who openly refuse to serve tenants using Section 8 vouchers. Housing vouchers have been promoted as a way to provide affordable housing for low-income households and promote housing choice. However, studies have found that using vouchers is a difficult and discouraging process as many landlords refuse vouchers.

The United States Census has shown that ethnic and racial minorities living in concentrated, high-poverty areas had actually increased following the passage of the Fair Housing Act from 1970 to 1990. African-Americans residing in these areas rose from 16 percent to 24 percent, and Hispanics living in these areas have increased from 10 percent to 15 percent. While this does not necessarily point to evidence of housing discrimination, it does mirror the phenomenon of white flight—the mass exodus during the 1970s and '80s of European-Americans from cities to the suburbs that left only one-fourth of the Anglo population still living in metropolitan areas. American sociologist Douglas Massey, in his essay, "The New Geography of Inequality in Urban America", argues that this new racial geography in the United States has laid the foundation for housing discrimination to occur in order to keep up the status quo.

After the passage of the Fair Housing Act and the end of redlining and more explicitly discriminatory practices, "predatory inclusion" began. Housing and Urban Development and Federal Housing Authority officials encouraged the spread of homeownership among low-income African Americans. There was an emphasis on a "public-private partnership," and the private sector was seen as the way to end the housing crisis. However, the terms of mortgages and loans were at much worse rates than those for white households. Furthermore, the houses were often in poor conditions. Mortgage banks were unregulated and sought out individuals determined as high risk because their mortgages would be backed by the FHA. Thus, loan defaults and foreclosures created profit for mortgage banks at the expense of African American homeowners.

== Current housing discrimination practices ==
There are two types of housing discrimination: exclusionary and non-exclusionary. Exclusionary refers to limiting one's access to housing while one is seeking to rent or buy housing, while non-exclusionary refers to discriminatory treatment within one's current housing.

Certain policies that do not explicitly discriminate have also been found to cause housing discrimination in the United States. Disparate impact is a facially neutral housing policy that negatively impacts minorities or other protected groups of people. The Supreme Court upheld the decades long practice of holding housing providers liable for housing discrimination under a disparate impact theory in 2015. Following the Supreme Court decision, HUD issued an opinion from their Office of General Counsel concluding that blanket prohibitions against tenants with criminal convictions would constitute disparate impact housing discrimination because some people are psychologically more likely to be criminals. Disparate impact remains controversial among industry and business professionals because some feel that their freedom in implementing policies and rules is now limited.

Housing discrimination continues to affect African Americans in many ways. Practices such as redlining, in which mortgage lenders historically denied loans to minority neighborhoods, have contributed to residential segregation and limited access to quality schools, healthcare, and employment. African American homeowners often experience lower home appraisals compared with similar homes in white neighborhoods, reducing opportunities for wealth and generational wealth. Segregated neighborhoods are also more likely to face environmental hazards such as industrial spills. The uneven enforcement of policies like "Affirmatively Furthering Fair Housing" has further perpetuated disparities in housing, health, and economic outcomes, illustrating how historical and contemporary policies continue to maintain structural inequality in the United States. [1]

1. Lederer, A., & McCracken, T. (2021, April 28). The Many Effects of Housing Discrimination on African Americans. National Community Reinvestment Coalition. https://ncrc.org/the-many-effects-of-housing-discrimination-on-african-americans/

John Yinger argued that discriminatory housing practices in the housing market have led to segregation, citing examples such as realtors opting to place public housing in crowded inner city minority neighborhoods instead of neighborhoods with an Anglo majority due to "public and political pressure." Other housing phenomena that Yinger argues encourage segregation are those of sorting and bidding, in which bidders perceived to be higher-class win out on cheaper per-square-foot, larger homes farther away from inner cities.

Quasi-experimental audit studies, in which equally qualified individuals of different races both participate in housing searches, have found strong evidence of racial housing discrimination in the United States. In a comprehensive study by the HUD in 2000, paired-tests (in which two applicants of different races but the same economic status and credit scores apply to rent or buy a house) were used to determine whether or not statistics about segregation truly pointed to housing discrimination. This study reported that although adverse treatment of racial and ethnic minorities has decreased over time, roughly 25 percent of white applicants were still favored above those who were African-American or Hispanic. About 17 percent of African American applicants and 20 percent of Hispanic applicants were subjected to adverse treatment, including receiving less information about a home or being shown fewer, lower-quality units. A meta-analysis of housing discrimination by race/ethnicity published in 2020 found that discrimination is still prevalent but has declined in recent decades. Sociologists have found that housing discrimination also extends to roommate selection.

Contrary to common misconception, the correlation between racial makeup and house price has risen over the past several decades.

=== Recent controversies ===
Internet classified platforms have also faced scrutiny under the Fair Housing Act; in 2008, the Ninth Circuit Court of Appeals ruled in Fair Housing Council of San Fernando Valley v. Roommates.com, LLC, that Roommates.com had induced housing discrimination by allowing users to specify roommate preferences on their profiles in pre-determined categories relating to protected classes such as gender. This was ruled to not fall under the Section 230 safe harbor, which protects interactive computer services from liability for the actions of their users, because Roommates.com was specifically responsible for having provided specific means to engage in conduct illegal under the Fair Housing Act; however, the site was not deemed responsible for information provided in a field that allowed users to type in additional comments. The Roommates.com decision was overturned in 2012, however, with the court ruling that due to the intimacy of this relationship, it would be a violation of their "privacy, autonomy and security" if tenants were unable to seek a roommate that was compatible with their own lifestyle.

Facebook has faced accusations that its targeted advertising platform facilitates housing discrimination, as it allowed advertisers to target or exclude specific audiences from campaigns, and that its advertising-delivery system is optimized to favor demographics that are the most likely to interact with an ad, even if they are not explicitly specified by the advertiser. After an investigation by ProPublica, Facebook removed the ability for housing advertisers to target ads based on a user's "affinity" to a specific culture or ethnicity, a behavior that is calculated based on the user's interactions on the service. However, it was found that advertisers could still discriminate based on interests implicating protected classes (such as Spanish-language television networks), and redlining ZIP code ranges.

After signing a legally binding agreement with the State of Washington, Facebook announced that it would remove at least 5,000 categories from its exclusion system to prevent "misuse" including those relating to races and religions. On March 19, 2019, to settle a lawsuit with the National Fair Housing Alliance, Facebook agreed to create a separate portal for housing, employment, and credit (HEC) advertising with limited targeting options by September 2019, and to provide a public archive of all HEC advertising. Less than two weeks later, HUD filed a lawsuit against Facebook, formally accusing the company of facilitating housing discrimination.

=== LGBT housing discrimination ===
States that prohibit housing discrimination based on sexual orientation or gender identity. HUD regulations require all housing providers that receive HUD funding not to discriminate against an individual's sexual orientation or gender identity. Prohibits housing discrimination based on sexual orientation and gender identity Prohibits housing discrimination based on sexual orientation only Does not factor sexual orientation or gender identity/unclear

Housing discrimination focuses more on race, but recent studies have shown a growing trend toward discrimination in the housing market against those who identify themselves as gay, lesbian, or transgender. Since housing discrimination based on sexual orientation was not explicitly cited in the Fair Housing Act, as of 2007, it was banned in only 17 states. In all states, same-sex couples are frequently unable to apply to public housing as a family unit, thus decreasing their chances at being accepted into the program. For instance, in a comprehensive study done by the Fair Housing Centers of Michigan in 2007, statistics showed that out of 120 paired-tests, almost 30 percent of same-sex couples were given higher rental rates and less encouragement to rent, both examples of non-exclusionary housing discrimination. An HUD study released in 2011 surveyed of 6,450 transgender and gender non-conforming persons and found that "19 percent reported having been refused a house or an apartment because of gender identity."

On January 30, 2012, HUD Secretary Shaun Donovan announced new regulations that would require all housing providers that receive HUD funding to prevent housing discrimination based on sexual orientation or gender identity. These regulations went into effect on March 5, 2012.

=== Ethnic and racial minority housing discrimination ===
Ethnic and racial minorities are impacted the most by housing discrimination. Exclusionary discrimination against African Americans most often occurs in rental markets and sales markets. Families are vulnerable to exclusion, but African American women are especially overrepresented as victims, especially single African American mothers. This discriminatory exclusion is because of stereotypes concerning race and single women. The presence of children in a minority family at times is what warrants the discrimination. African Americans are also the victims in most non-exclusionary cases, with African American women still overrepresented. Non-exclusionary forms of discrimination such as racial slurs and intimidation affect many minority victims. Some racial minorities suffer the purposeful neglect of service needs, such as a landlord fixing a white tenant's bathtub quickly but delaying to fix the bathtub of the minority tenant. Data obtained by Ohio Civil Rights Commission studied housing discrimination cases between 1988 and 2003, and of the 2,176 cases filed, 1,741 were filed by African Americans. A study by HUD released in 2005 found that more and more Hispanics are facing discrimination in their housing searches. A 2011 article by HUD asserts that one out of five times, Asian Americans and Pacific Islanders receive less favorable treatment than others when they seek housing. Some cases brought to the Department of Justice show that municipalities and other local government entities violated the Fair Housing Act of 1968 when they denied African Americans housing, permits, and zoning changes, or steered them toward neighborhoods with a predominantly minority population.

A study conducted by the U.S. Department of Housing and Urban Development (HUD) found that, "The greatest share of discrimination for Hispanic and African American home seekers can still be attributed to being told units are unavailable when they are available to non-Hispanic whites and being shown and told about less units than a comparable non-minority." Consumer advocate groups conducted studies and found that many minority borrowers who were eligible for affordable, traditional loans were often steered toward incredibly high-priced subprime loans that they would never be able to repay.

The National Bureau of Economic Research (NBER) report titled "Racial Discrimination and Housing Outcomes in the United States Rental Market" reveals that African-American and Hispanic renters experience significant housing discrimination that adversely affects their housing situations across the 50 largest metropolitan areas in the U.S. However, the extent of this discrimination varies by region and specific metropolitan area. The authors—Peter Christensen, Christopher Timmins, and Ignacio Sarmiento-Barbieri—found that higher levels of discrimination, particularly against African Americans, are linked to increased residential segregation and economic mobility disparities. To investigate discriminatory practices, the researchers developed a bot that interacted with online property listings from 8,476 property managers in these metropolitan areas. The bot utilized 18 different fictitious identities to represent potential renters of African American, Hispanic, or white backgrounds. This methodology allowed the researchers to assess response rates from property managers based on varying racial and ethnic identities. They then matched response data from listings with the racial and ethnic identities of the actual renter households that occupied those units, enabling a thorough analysis of the connection between discriminatory behavior and real housing outcomes. The findings Indicated that inquiries from white renters received responses 60% of the time, while those from African American and Hispanic renters had lower average response rates of 54.4% and 57.2%, respectively. The results showed regional and metropolitan variations. In comparison to inquiries from white renters, African American inquiries received 12% fewer responses in the Midwest and Northeast, 7.9% fewer in the West, and 7.6% fewer in the South. Hispanic inquiries faced response rates that were 8.1% lower in the Northeast, 5.2% lower in the South, 3.6% lower in the Midwest, and 2.6% lower in the West compared to white inquiries. The most significant discrimination against African Americans was observed in Chicago, IL; Los Angeles, CA; and Louisville, KY, while Hispanics experienced the highest levels of discrimination in Louisville, KY; Houston, TX; and Providence, RI.

Latinos are underrepresented in government-assisted housing. One report concludes that Hispanics were underrepresented in the HUD assisted housing stock in 71% of counties. Among the top quartile of counties for Hispanic underrepresentation in HUD housing assistance programs, Hispanics made up 29% of the poverty population, but only 5% of HUD assisted households on average. These high disparity counties tended to include traditional Hispanic communities where Hispanic populations are larger, such as in California, Texas, and East Coast population centers. A higher Hispanic share of the county’s population, higher Hispanic poverty rate, a larger share of foreign-born Hispanics, and a greater share of the foreign-born Hispanics who were noncitizens were all associated with a county being in the top quartile of counties for underrepresentation in HUD assistance programs.

Native Americans also experience ongoing discrimination. According to Npr.org, the most recent study from the Department of Housing and Urban Development shows that one in four Native Americans has experienced housing discrimination, but few get around to filing formal complaints.

=== Disability housing discrimination ===
The Fair Housing Act forbids discrimination based on disability status. That means a landlord cannot reject someone for housing for being disabled, and a resident with a disability is entitled to reasonable accommodations. It defines a person with a disability as "Any person who has a physical or mental impairment that substantially limits one or more major life activities; has a record of such impairment; or is regarded as having such an impairment." The Americans with Disabilities Act of 1990 also forbids discrimination against people with disabilities by public entities or programs, such as public housing.

Research has shown that there is discrimination against those who use wheelchairs and those who are deaf in the rental housing market. This study found that many landlords and housing providers are not fully aware of their obligations to provide accessible housing or of the accessibility of their properties. A 2010 HUD study found evidence of housing discrimination against those with mental disabilities. The researchers of these studies emphasized the need for increase paired testing for discrimination in the housing market.

=== Gender discrimination ===
Research on discrimination in the rental housing market has uncovered gender biases. A meta-analysis of 25 separate correspondence studies done by the Journal of Housing Economics found that applicants with minority and male-sounding names are discriminated against in the rental housing market even under the same circumstances and with all else equal.

Additionally women face unequal cost burdens for housing. According to The Gender Equity Policy Institute, "a sizable majority of women renters (53%) spend over 30 percent of their income on housing. By comparison, fewer than half of men renters (47%) do. Moreover, nearly three in ten women renters (27%) spend over 50 percent of their income on housing. Among those in owned homes, 28 percent of women are cost burdened, compared to 26 percent of men."

== Effects of housing discrimination ==
John Yinger, a sociologist who has studied housing discrimination, argues that it is something perhaps most concretely evidenced by its effects: concentrated poverty. People who suffer from housing discrimination often live in lower-quality housing. Housing inequalities often reflect the unequal distribution of income. Poor areas suffer from educational disparities, and a poor education translates into earnings disparities. Those who earn less can only afford lower-quality housing. Segregation, health risks, and wealth disparities all relate to poverty. According to a study in the Journal of Economics, homeownership rates for Asian American and Hispanic minorities are negatively impacted by an immigrant status. Thus, their homeownership rates are lower than other demographic groups even when factors like income are accounted for.

=== Residential segregation ===
Perhaps the most unmistakable consequence of housing discrimination is residential segregation. Housing discrimination helps reinforce residential segregation through mortgage discrimination, redlining, and predatory lending practices. Racial avoidance and threats of violence also result in racial segregation. Housing discrimination can also impact minority preferences over time, as individuals or families experiencing harassment and intimidation at their home on a daily basis may transition to more accepting neighborhoods.

After Brown v. Board of Education, many white families took advantage of the growing highway system and suburbanization to leave cities to avoid integrated schools, which became known as White flight. White flight was facilitated by FHA policies such as race-restricted deeds and zoning, as well as by blockbusting. This led to what is known as urban decay, and the achievement gap between inner-city and suburban schools widened.

According to the U.S. Census of Population in 1990, 25.3 percent of all Anglo-Americans in the U.S. lived in central city areas. The percentage of African Americans living in inner cities was 56.9 percent, and the percentage of inner city Hispanics was 51.5 percent. Asian Americans living in central cities totaled 46.3 percent. According to a more recent U.S. Census Bureau study in 2002, the average white person living in a metropolitan area lives in a neighborhood that is 80 percent white and seven percent black, while the average African American lives in a neighborhood that is 33 percent white and more than 51 percent black. As of 2000, 75 percent of all African Americans lived in highly segregated communities, making them the most segregated group in the nation. These statistics do not necessarily point to evidence of housing discrimination, but rather to segregation based on historical reasons which have made ethnic and racial minorities more economically deprived, and thus prone to living in more poverty-stricken inner city areas.

=== Health disparities ===
Housing discrimination has contributed to environmental racism, which refers to how communities of color suffer from disproportionate exposure to toxins and other health risks. Those suffering housing discrimination and people living below the poverty threshold often rent small or low-quality housing. Lead paint left over from past years and animal pests, such as rats, can be found in older housing, resulting in serious health consequences. Lead can lead to lowered intelligence in children. Asthma is also a problem that comes with lower-quality housing, since more air pollution, dust, mold, and mildew are more likely to occur.

Housing discrimination has led to climate differences between neighborhoods. A study found that formerly redlined neighborhoods are several degrees hotter than non-redlined neighborhoods. This differences can be explained in differences of development and infrastructure. Poorer, non-white neighborhoods have fewer trees and often are closer to highways and factories. The larger amount of asphalt and cement contributes to the urban heat island effect. The differences in temperature contribute to health disparities and premature heat-related deaths.

=== Neighborhood and educational effects ===
Neighborhood effects are also seen due to housing discrimination and residential segregation. The housing inequality that comes with living in lower-quality housing means that neighborhood amenities are lacking. Education policy is intrinsically connected to housing policy as integration of schools requires integration of neighborhoods. Educational inequalities exist between wealthier and poorer areas. Poorer areas typically offer worse education, leading to educational and employment disadvantages and a higher school dropout rate. Schools are often segregated due to the effects of housing discrimination and residential segregation, in turn hindering students' educational performance. Schools with a high proportion of disadvantaged students, such as schools in segregated areas, have worse educational outcomes that are compounded by other disparities, such as differences in parental education, local crime, access to healthcare, and extracurricular opportunities. These differences and their impacts are known as the achievement gap. A study conducted by the Century Foundation in Montgomery County, Md., showed that students from a low-income background enrolled in affluent schools did better than students in higher-poverty schools. Criminal activity, including gang life and drug abuse, is also more prevalent in poorer areas. The rate of teenage pregnancy has been shown to increase in these areas as well. Urban, low-income schools are often contributors to the school to prison pipeline. Students from low socioeconomic neighborhoods perform worse academically and on standardized testing, and high-stakes testing provides an incentive to push these students out to the juvenile justice system.

=== Wealth disparities ===
In the US, white households have a median wealth of $134,230, while Black households have a median wealth of $11,030, demonstrating significant wealth disparities. Sociologists Thomas Shapiro and Jessica Kenty-Drane, as well as Richard Rothstein, state that wealth disparities are a result of housing discrimination, as housing discrimination acts as a barrier to homeownership. Other scholars have argued that African American homeowners and renters were exploited for profit as they often paid higher prices for their houses and apartments than those in surrounding white neighborhoods. This "race tax" has contributed to wealth disparities as it hindered wealth accumulation.

Homeowners may learn management and home repair skills, and the children of homeowners are less likely to drop out of high school or to have children as teenagers. Additionally, credit constraints limit homeownership for people with low income. Housing discrimination that keeps families from affordable loans and nicer areas with increasing property values keep victims from accumulating wealth. Residential segregation also leads to generational wealth disparities. Children often inherit wealth from their parents, and if parents were forced into poor-quality housing because of housing discrimination, then there is less wealth to hand down.

== Possible solutions ==
Sociologist Douglas Massey argues that housing discrimination is a moving target. As federal legislation concerning anti-housing discrimination policies become more effective, new forms of housing discrimination have emerged to perpetuate residential segregation, and in turn, poverty.

The Urban Institute and other policy experts have called for more paired testing research in order to expose current housing discrimination. Paired testing research would involve sending two separate applicants who are similar except for race to a realtor or landlord, and their treatment by the landlord or agent is compared. Paired tests have found that realtors show white families more apartments and households than Black or Latino families.

There have been a number of solutions proposed to finally end the threat of housing discrimination and eliminate any legal loopholes in which it may operate. So far fair housing enforcement of federal legislation concerning housing discrimination has faced challenges. The main burden of enforcement falls on federal financial regulatory institutions, like the Federal Reserve Board, and the HUD. The enforcement provisions of the Fair Housing Act of 1968 were limited, and even though the act was amended in 1988, there are still problems with enforcement since housing discrimination often happens one-on-one and is not very visible, even in audits. The Fair Housing Amendment Act of 1988 did make a system of administrative law judges to hear housing discrimination cases to help against the illegal actions. Other examples of federal legislation may include increased federal legislation enforcement, scattered-site housing, or state and local enforcement on a more concentrated level. Better methods of enforcement in addition to new policies are proposed to be a help. In 2010 the Justice Department under President Barack Obama made a new fair-lending unit.

Inclusionary remedies to truly enforce integration are also proposed. Inclusionary housing refers to making sure that areas are integrated, and inclusionary housing increases chances for racial minorities to gain and sustain employment. Recently Montgomery County, Md., passed an ordinance to require new housing developments to consist of a percentage of moderately priced dwelling units, guaranteeing more affordable better housing for 10 years.

Other proposed solutions include subsidies, such as direct subsidies, project-based subsidies, household-based subsidies, and tax reductions. As of 2001, only 15.7 percent of poor households received federal housing subsidies, meaning a majority of people in poor households did not receive that help. Household-based subsidies have been a significant source of new housing assistance as of late. HUD has handed out housing certificates to allow participants of Section 8 to move into higher-quality housing units. One experiment, known as Moving to Opportunity, gave vouchers to the treatment group that could only be used in low-poverty neighborhoods. Although the findings were mixed for education and income, improvements in physical wellbeing and mental health were statistically significant. However, critics have argued that removing people from community networks can lead to isolation and social disintegration.

Angela Blackwell argues that it is important to prioritize policy and city planning. However, looking beyond urban regimes and accepting the nexus of these regimes is the first step for change that planners can take. This can be done through the notion of Equitable Development, an approach that aims to create communities of opportunity. Inequalities oppressing low-income communities composed of diverse ethnicities are not only unethical but prove to be economically and environmentally unsustainable. Partnership between government, private sectors, and community-based organizations to manipulate public policy for the promotion of social equity, as well as, economic growth and environmental sustainability are crucial for justice.

== See also ==
- Housing segregation in the United States
- Housing insecurity in the United States
- Housing inequality
- Redlining
- Subsidized housing
- Residential segregation in the United States
- United States Department of Housing and Urban Development
- Right to housing
- Shani Mott
