= Civil Rights Act of 1968 =

United States law

- Long title: An Act to prescribe penalties for certain acts of violence or intimidation, and for other purposes.
- Nicknames: Indian Civil Rights Act; Indian Bill of Rights; Fair Housing Act; Housing Rights Act; Open Housing Act; Anti-Riot Act; Federal Anti-Riot Act; Rap Brown Act; Rap Brown Law; Civil Obedience Act; Stokely Carmichael Act
- Enacted by: the 90th United States Congress
- Effective: April 11, 1968

Citations
- Public law: 90-284
- Statutes at Large: 82 Stat. 73

Codification
- Titles amended: 18 U.S.C.: Crimes and Criminal Procedure; 25 U.S.C.: Indians; 42 U.S.C.: Public Health and Welfare

Legislative history
- Introduced in the House as H.R. 2516 by Emanuel Celler (D–NY) on January 17, 1967; Committee consideration by House Judiciary Committee; Passed the House on August 16, 1967 (327–93); Passed the Senate on March 11, 1968 (71–20) with amendment; House agreed to Senate amendment on April 10, 1968 (250–172); Signed into law by President Lyndon B. Johnson on April 11, 1968

Major amendments
- Section 1983; Housing and Community Development Act of 1974; Fair Housing Amendments Act of 1988; Housing for Older Persons Act

United States Supreme Court cases
- Jones v. Alfred H. Mayer Co., 392 U.S. 409 (1968); Hunter v. Erickson, 393 U.S. 385 (1969); Kennerly v. District Court, 400 U.S. 423 (1971); Trafficante v. Metropolitan Life Ins. Co., 409 U.S. 205 (1972); Curtis v. Loether, 415 U.S. 189 (1974); Gladstone, Realtors v. Village of Bellwood, 441 U.S. 91 (1979); Havens Realty Corp. v. Coleman, 455 U.S. 363 (1982); City of Edmonds v. Oxford House, Inc., 514 U.S. 725 (1995); Meyer v. Holley, 537 U.S. 280 (2003); City of Cuyahoga Falls v. Buckeye Community Hope Foundation, 538 U.S. 188 (2003); Texas Department of Housing and Community Affairs v. Inclusive Communities Project, Inc., 576 U.S. 519 (2015); Bank of America Corp. v. City of Miami, 581 U.S. ___ (2017)

The Civil Rights Act of 1968 (Pub. L. 90–284, 82 Stat. 73, enacted April 11, 1968) is a landmark law in the United States signed into law by President Lyndon B. Johnson during the King assassination riots.

Titles II through VII comprise the Indian Civil Rights Act, which applies to the Native American tribes of the United States and makes many but not all of the guarantees of the U.S. Bill of Rights applicable within the tribes. (That Act appears today in Title 25, sections 1301 to 1303 of the United States Code).

Titles VIII and IX are commonly known as the Fair Housing Act, which was meant as a follow-up to the Civil Rights Act of 1964. (This is different legislation than the Housing and Urban Development Act of 1968, which expanded housing funding programs.) While the Civil Rights Act of 1866 prohibited discrimination in housing, there were no federal enforcement provisions. The 1968 act expanded on previous acts and prohibited discrimination concerning the sale, rental, and financing of housing based on race, religion, national origin, and since 1974, sex. Since 1988, the act protects people with disabilities and families with children. Pregnant women are also protected from illegal discrimination because they have been given familial status with their unborn child being the other family member. Victims of discrimination may use both the 1968 act and the 1866 act's section 1983 to seek redress. The 1968 act provides for federal solutions while the 1866 act provides for private solutions (i.e., civil suits). The act also made it a federal crime to "by force or by threat of force, injure, intimidate, or interfere with anyone... by reason of their race, color, religion, or national origin, handicap or familial status."

Title X, commonly known as the Anti-Riot Act, makes it a felony to "travel in interstate commerce...with the intent to incite, promote, encourage, participate in and carry on a riot." That provision has been criticized for "equating organized political protest with organized violence."

== Background ==
The first shift towards equality for African Americans occurred when President Abraham Lincoln passed the Emancipation Proclamation in 1863, which declared that "all persons held as slaves... shall be then, thenceforward, and forever free...". The Civil Rights Act of 1866 declared all people born in the United States are legally citizens. That means they could rent, hold, sell and buy property. It was meant to help former slaves, and those who refused to grant the new rights to ex-slaves were guilty and punishable under law. The penalty was a fine of $1000 or a maximum of one year in jail. The 1866 act provided no means to enforce the provisions.

The Civil Rights Movement (1954–1968), beginning after the Brown v. Board of Education case, paved the way for the passage of a few civil rights bills. The Civil Rights Act of 1957 created the United States Commission on Civil Rights and the United States Department of Justice Civil Rights Division. The Civil Rights Act of 1960 enacted federal legislation of local registration polls and if anyone obstructed someone's right to vote, there were severe penalties. It also extended the Civil Rights Commission, so it could oversee registration and voting practices. The Civil Rights Act of 1964 outlawed discrimination on the basis of race, color, religion, sex, and national origin. Unequal application of voter registration requirements, racial segregation, and employment discrimination were also prohibited. The Voting Rights Act of 1965, similar to the Civil Rights Act of 1964, prohibited racial discrimination in voting. The Act was later expanded to help protect the right to vote for racial minorities throughout the country (mainly the South).

Another impetus for the law's passage came from the 1966 Chicago Open Housing Movement, led by Martin Luther King Jr., James Bevel, and Al Raby. Also influential was the 1963 Rumford Fair Housing Act in California, which had been backed by the NAACP and CORE. and the 1967 Milwaukee fair housing campaigns led by James Groppi and the NAACP Youth Council. Senator Walter Mondale advocated for the bill in Congress, but noted that over successive years, a federal fair housing bill was the most filibustered legislation in US history. It was opposed by most Northern and Southern senators, as well as the National Association of Real Estate Boards. A proposed "Civil Rights Act of 1966" collapsed completely because of its fair housing provision. Mondale commented:

A lot of [previous] civil rights [legislation] was about making the South behave and taking the teeth from George Wallace…. This came right to the neighborhoods across the country. This was civil rights getting personal.

Two developments revived the bill. The Kerner Commission report on the 1967 race riots strongly recommended "a comprehensive and enforceable federal open housing law," and was cited regularly by Congress members arguing for the legislation. The final breakthrough came in the aftermath of the April 4, 1968, assassination of Martin Luther King Jr. and the civil unrest across the country following King's death. On April 5, Johnson wrote a letter to the United States House of Representatives urging passage of the Fair Housing Act. The Rules Committee, "jolted by the repeated civil disturbances virtually outside its door," finally ended its hearings on April 8. With newly urgent attention from legislative director Joseph Califano and Democratic Speaker of the House John McCormack, the bill (which was previously stalled) passed the House by a wide margin on April 10.

Due to the prohibition against discrimination on the basis of race, nationality, and religion, the Fair Housing Act of 1968 prohibited both antisemitic and anti-Black covenants from being enforced. The act was supported by many Jewish organizations and individuals.

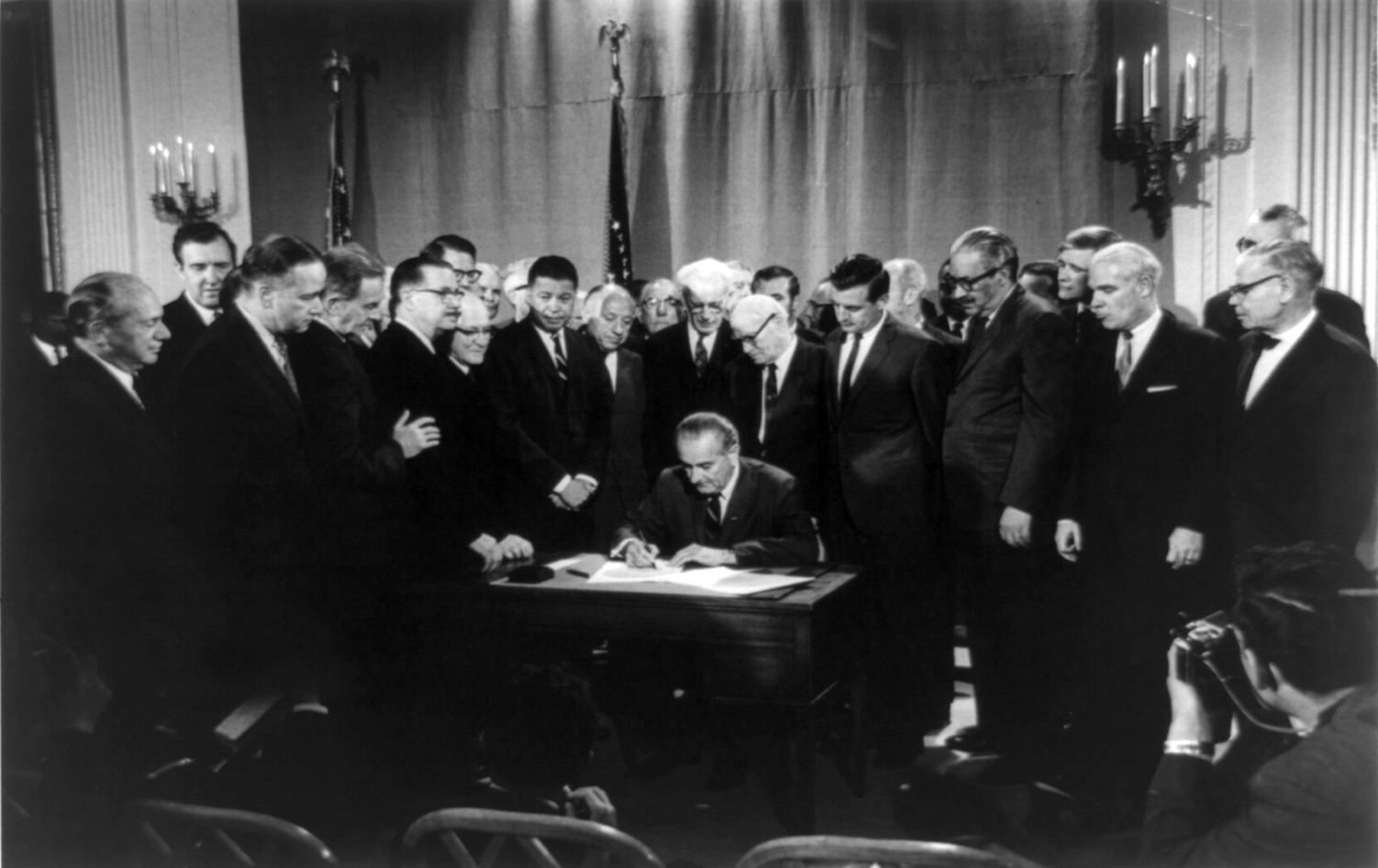
President Johnson signing the Civil Rights Act of 1968

== Summary of Titles ==
=== Title I: Hate crimes ===
The Civil Rights Act of 1968 also enacted 18 U.S.C. § 245(b)(2), which permits federal prosecution of anyone who "willingly injures, intimidates or interferes with another person, or attempts to do so, by force because of the other person's race, color, religion or national origin" because of the victim's attempt to engage in one of six types of federally protected activities, such as attending school, patronizing a public place/facility, applying for employment, acting as a juror in a state court or voting.

Persons violating this law face a fine or imprisonment of up to one year or both. If bodily injury results or if such acts of intimidation involve the use of firearms, explosives or fire, individuals can receive prison terms of up to 10 years, while crimes involving kidnapping, sexual assault, or murder can be punishable by life in prison or the death penalty.

Though sexual orientation and gender identity were also excluded from this law, they are included in a more recent Federal hate-crime law, the Matthew Shepard and James Byrd Jr. Hate Crimes Prevention Act.

=== Title II–VII: Indian Civil Rights Act ===
The Indian Civil Rights Act of 1968 granted Native Americans full access to the United States Bill of Rights. The first minor section focuses on re-establishing amendments now granted to Native Americans. The main portion of the section focuses on Native Americans in the United States legal system. The last section of this act points out other materials related to more constitutional rights of Native Americans, such as the "Indian Affairs, Laws and Treaties" doctrine.

=== Title VIII–IX: Fair Housing Act ===
==== Housing discrimination ====
Title VIII of the Civil Rights Act of 1968 is commonly referred to as the Fair Housing Act of 1968. Since 1968 its protections have been expanded significantly by amendment. The Office of Fair Housing and Equal Opportunity within the U.S. Department of Housing and Urban Development is charged with administering and enforcing this law.

==== Types of banned discrimination ====
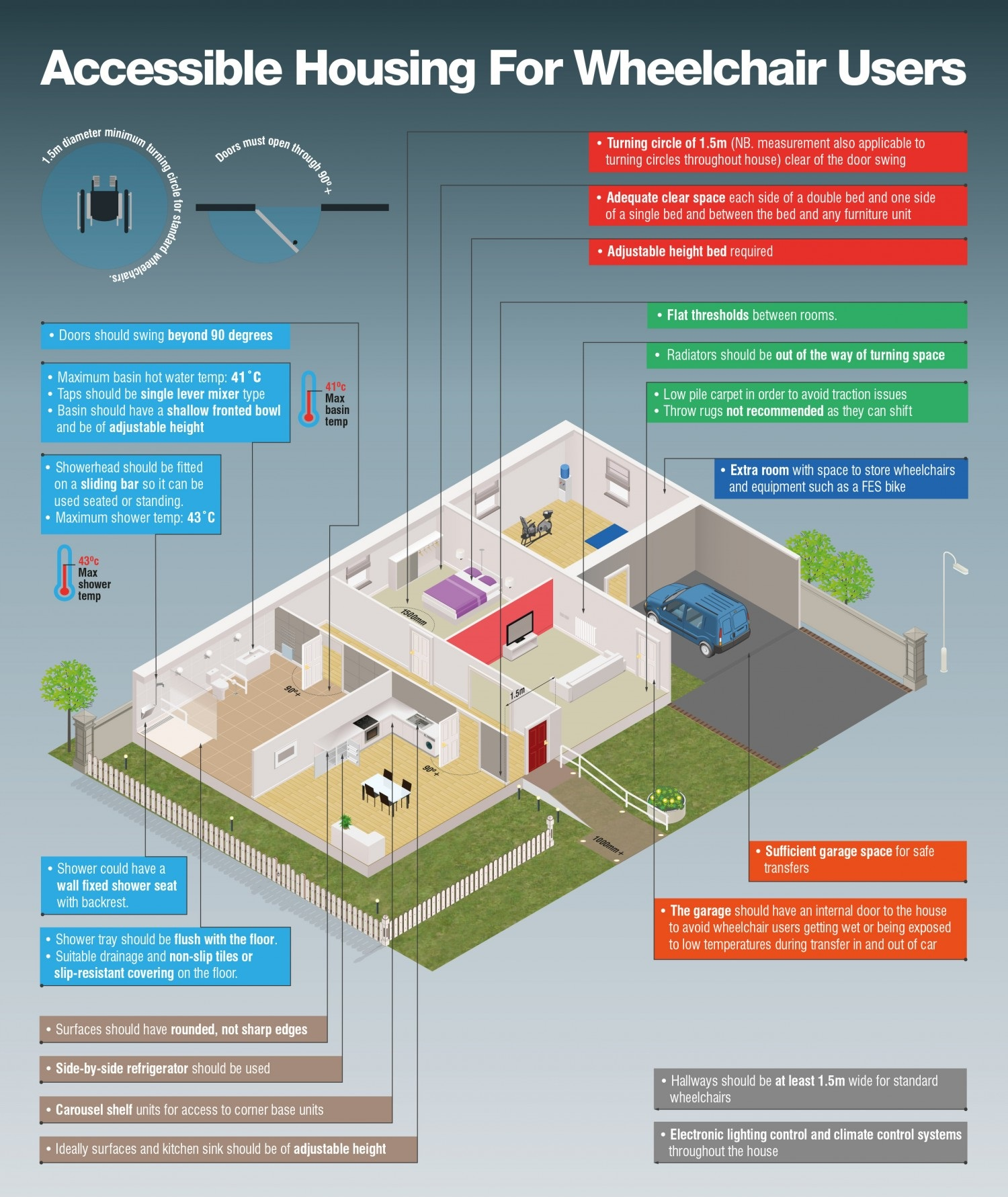
This shows what accessible housing looks like and some of the changes residents might make under the Fair Housing Act to make their living units accessible

The Civil Rights Act of 1968 prohibited the following forms of housing discrimination:

- Refusal to sell or rent a dwelling to any person because of their race, color, religion or national origin. Discrimination on the basis of sex was added in 1974, and people with disabilities and families with children were added to the list of protected classes in 1988.
- Discrimination against a person in the terms, conditions or privilege of the sale or rental of a dwelling.
- Advertising the sale or rental of a dwelling indicating preference of discrimination based on race, color, religion or national origin. This provision was also amended to include sex, disability, and having children.
- Coercing, threatening, intimidating, or interfering with a person's enjoyment or exercise of housing rights based on discriminatory reasons or retaliating against a person or organization that aids or encourages the exercise or enjoyment of fair housing rights.
- Neglecting maintenance and repairs of the units rented by people based on race, religion, sex, or any other discriminatory demographic.
- Restricting access to services and amenities on the basis of the renter's race, gender, religion, or nationality.
- In 2012, the United States Department of Housing and Urban Development's Office of Fair Housing and Equal Opportunity issued a regulation prohibiting LGBT discrimination in federally assisted housing programs. The Supreme Court ruled in 2020 that discrimination on the basis of "sex" includes discrimination on the basis of sexual orientation and gender identity. It was not until February 2021 that Housing and Urban Development issued a rule change under President Joe Biden to implement this decision. In addition, many states, cities and towns have passed laws prohibiting discrimination in housing based on sexual orientation and gender identity.

==== Types of allowed discrimination ====
Only certain kinds of discrimination are covered by fair housing laws. Landlords are not required by law to rent to any tenant who applies for a property. Landlords can select tenants based on objective business criteria, such as the applicant's ability to pay the rent and take care of the property. Landlords can lawfully discriminate against tenants with bad credit histories or low incomes, and (except in some areas) do not have to rent to tenants who will be receiving Section 8 vouchers. Landlords must be consistent in the screening, treat tenants who are inside and outside the protected classes in the same manner, and should document any legitimate business reason for not renting to a prospective tenant.

The United States Department of Housing and Urban Development has stated that buyers and renters may discriminate and may request real estate agents representing them to limit home searches to parameters that are discriminatory. The primary purpose of the Fair Housing Act is to protect the buyer's (and renter's) right to seek a dwelling anywhere they choose. It protects the buyer's right to discriminate by prohibiting certain discriminatory acts by sellers, landlords, and real estate agents.

==== People with disabilities ====
The Fair Housing Act defines a person with a disability in the same manner as the Americans with Disabilities Act – "a person with a physical or mental impairment which substantially limits one or more major life activities; a record of such an impairment; or being regarded as having such an impairment."

The Fair Housing Act provides several specific protections for buyers and tenants with disabilities. Landlords and sellers cannot make a dwelling unit unavailable or deny a dwelling to a buyer or renter because of their disability or the disability of any person who intends to reside in the dwelling or because of the disability of anyone with whom they are associated. Landlords cannot deny a person with a disability all of the privileges provided in connection with the dwelling, because of the person's disability.

The Fair Housing Act (FHA) provides some specific protections for people with disabilities that facilitate independence and community living. First, the FHA allows tenants to make reasonable modifications to the existing premises. It makes it illegal for landlords to not allow people with disabilities to make reasonable modifications to the premises, at their own expense, if they need the modification to have full enjoyment of the premises. For example, an individual with a disability may require grab bars installed in order to have access to take a shower. The landlord must allow the tenant to install the grab bars to allow access to take a shower. However, technically, the landlord may require the tenant remove the grab bars at the end of the tenancy, at the tenant's own expense. However, the regulations specify that in rental housing, a landlord may not condition widening a bathroom doorway to provide wheelchair access, to its return to its former narrow state upon the end of the tenancy, since it will not interfere with the next tenants use and enjoyment of the premises.

The second protection offered by the FHA includes the requirement that no one can refuse to make reasonable accommodations to “rules, policies, practices, or services, when the accommodation is necessary to afford” a person with a disability “equal opportunity to use and enjoy a dwelling unit,” including the amenities of the dwelling, which may involve common areas. For example, a building with a “No Pets” policy would violate the FHA if it did not allow a blind person to have their seeing eye dog live with them as a reasonable accommodation to the policy. Similarly, a wheelchair user could request an assigned, accessible parking space as a reasonable accommodation in a “first come first serve” parking lot attached to an apartment complex.

=== Title X: Anti-Riot Act ===
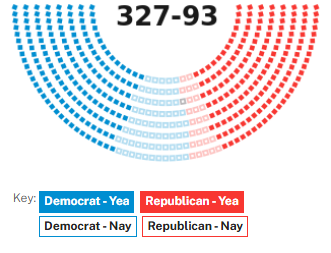
The breakdown of the first vote in the US House by party of The Civil Rights Act of 1968. August 16, 1967

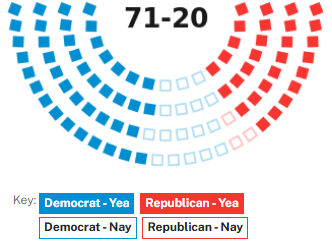
The vote breakdown in the US Senate by party of The Civil Rights Act of 1968. March 11, 1968

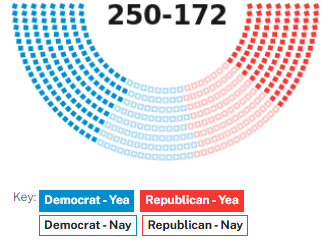
The breakdown of the second vote in the US House by party of The Civil Rights Act of 1968. April 10, 1968

The Act included the "Anti-Riot Act," enacted at 18 U.S.C. § 2101 (with its key terms, "riot" and "incite a riot," defined in 18 U.S.C. § 2102), which makes it a federal crime to use interstate or foreign commerce routes or facilities (such as by crossing state lines or through mail, use of the Internet, or phone calls) to incite a riot, organize, promote or participate in a riot or to extend activities of a riot, or to aid and abet any person performing such activities. The provision has been informally referred to as the "H. Rap Brown Law" since the arrest and trial of H. Rap Brown in 1967 for carrying a gun across state lines. Rulings by the 4th Circuit in 2020 and 9th Circuit in 2021 struck down in those circuits the portions of the law which prohibit "urging" a riot on the grounds of freedom of speech, leaving in place bans on inciting and participation in riots.

== Legislative history ==
In 1966, President Johnson proposed a new civil rights bill, but it was not passed through by the Senate. On February 17, 1967, the bill was introduced in the House by Rep. Manny Celler and in the Senate by Senator Philip A. Hart.

The House Judiciary Committee cleared H.R. 2516 (civil rights bill) and HR 10805 (extended life of Civil Rights Commission for another five years). House Judiciary Subcommittee No. 5 June 22 approved a package combining H.R. 2516 and H.R. 421 (Administration bill) in order to strengthen protections for civil rights workers.

H.R. 2516 was taken up on the floor of the House of Representatives for an initial vote on August 16, 1967. The total result of the vote was 327–92. This bill, as passed, did not yet contain any fair housing provisions. The House Republican Conference voted 161 in favor and 25 against. The House Democratic Caucus voted 166 in favor and 67 against, with 1 member voting present and 11 members abstaining.

The bill, with amendments, was then taken up in the Senate and subsequently amended to include several new provisions, including what became the Fair Housing Act. Opponents of the bill filibustered, hoping to either prevent the bill's passage or to require the deletion of the fair housing provision. Three attempts to invoke cloture (which required two-thirds of the Senate's concurrence) were unsuccessful. However, on the fourth—and what would have been the final attempt if it had been unsuccessful—cloture was obtained on March 4, 1968, with no votes to spare, 65–32. The Senate voted in favor of amendments that would cover Native Americans on March 8, 1968 in a vote of 96-1 but 3 Senators did not vote on the amendments and the only Senator to vote against it was Clifford P. Case of New Jersey, although Case did vote in favor of the final version. On March 11, 1968, the Senate approved H.R. 2516 by a vote of 71–20, with Senate Republican Conference voting 29 in favor, 3 against, with 4 not voting. The Senate Democratic Caucus voted 42 in favor, 17 against, with 5 members not voting.

The bill then returned to the house to be reconsidered with the new amendments. The House Rules Committee, by a vote of 8–7, decided not to send the bill to a conference committee as is customary, and instead brought it to a floor vote, where it subsequently passed by a total vote of 250–172. House Republicans voted 100 in favor, 84 against, and 3 present. House Democrats voted 150 in favor, 88 against, 3 present, and 4 not voting.

After being officially passed by both chambers of the 90th United States Congress, it was signed by the 36th President of the United States, Lyndon B. Johnson on April 11, 1968.

== Titles ==
Note: Most of the information provided in this Section was paraphrased from the Titles. If you are interested at looking through the original titles, feel free to look at the Civil Rights Act of 1968.

=== Title I—interference with federally protected activities ===
Section 101 holds that Chapter 13, civil rights, title 18, United States Code, is amended by inserting a new section (Section 245) called Federally protected activities. It establishes that this section isn't set as an intent on the part of Congress, or is constructed to limited the authority of Federal officers (or Federal grand jury) to investigate possible violations in this section. In this section of the bill sets the standard for preventing any kind of threat of force by someone who willfully injures, intimidates, interferes with or even attempts any of these actions upon a person of color (full discrimination set as race, color, religion, or national origin) when the minority in question is:

- Voting or qualifying to vote, qualifying or campaigning as a candidate for elective office, or qualifying or acting as a poll watcher, or any legally authorized election official in any election
- Participating in or enjoying any benefit, service, privilege, program, facility
- Applying for or enjoying employment
- Serving, or attending upon any court in connection with possible service, as a grand or petit juror in any court
- Participating in or enjoying the benefits of any program or activity receiving Federal financial assistance
- Enrolling in or attending any public school or public college
- Traveling in or using airy facility of interstate commerce, or using any vehicle, terminal, or facility of any common carrier by motor, rail, water, or air
- Enjoying the goods, services, facilities, privileges, advantages, or accommodations of any inn, hotel, motel, or other establishment

Any citizen who has been ordered to discourage these citizens from aiding/encouraging other persons to participate without discrimination in any activities listed above will be:

- Fined $1,000 or imprisoned for a year (or both)
- Fined $10,000 or imprisoned for ten years (or both) if there was any sort of bodily injury
- Imprisoned for any term of years or for life if death has occurred

There is a similar section that also involved prevention for intimidation in fair housing, in Title XII.

The rest of the sections in this title are based around amendments to this legislative Act. For example, besides Section 245, Section 2101 called Riots has also been added. In this section, it focuses on putting a penalty behind any related riot actions, where a person can be fined $10,000 or imprisoned for 5 years (or both). There is a definition section (Section 2102) for defining: riot and to incite a riot. Also, This section also holds an edit for the United States Code, where a chapter called Riots is inserted.

=== Title II—rights of Indians ===
The Indian Civil Rights Act of 1968 applies to the Indian tribes of the United States and makes many but not all of the guarantees of the Bill of Rights applicable within the federally recognized tribes. The Act appears today in Title 25, sections 1301 to 1303 of the United States Code.

==== Events before passage ====
The US Supreme Court had made clear that tribal internal affairs concerning tribal members' individual rights were not covered by the Fifth Amendment to the US constitution. However, the tribes were ultimately subjected to the power of Congress and the Constitution. The court case Talton v. Mayes helped establish the principles. There were other court cases over the following years to continue the thoughts "that tribes were not arms of the federal government when punishing tribal members for criminal acts and that Indian tribes were exempt from many of the constitutional protections governing the actions of state and federal governments."

In the 1960s, Congress held a series of hearings on the subject of the authority of tribal governments. The hearings told about the abuses that many tribal members had endured from the "sometimes corrupt, incompetent, or tyrannical tribal officials." In response, the Indian Civil Rights Act was enacted.

==== Provisions of the Indian Civil Rights Act ====
No Indian tribe in exercising powers of self-government shall—

1. make or enforce any law prohibiting the free exercise of religion, or abridging the freedom of speech, or of the press, or the right of the people peaceably to assemble and to petition for a redress of grievances;
2. violate the right of the people to be secure in their persons, houses, papers, and effects against unreasonable search and seizures, nor issue warrants, but upon probable cause, supported by oath or affirmation, and particularly describing the place to be searched and the person or thing to be seized;
3. subject any person for the same offense to be twice put in jeopardy;
4. compel any person in any criminal case to be a witness against himself;
5. take any private property for a public use without just compensation;
6. deny to any person in a criminal proceeding the right to a speedy and public trial, to be informed of the nature and cause of the accusation, to be confronted with the witnesses against him, to have compulsory process for obtaining witnesses in his favor, and at his own expense to have the assistance of counsel for his defense;
7. require excessive bail, impose excessive fines, inflict cruel and unusual punishments, and in no event impose for conviction of any one offense any penalty or punishment greater than imprisonment for a term of one year and a fine of $5,000, or both;
8. deny to any person within its jurisdiction the equal protection of its laws or deprive any person of liberty or property without due process of law;
9. pass any bill of attainder or ex post facto law; or
10. deny to any person accused of an offense punishable by imprisonment the right, upon request, to a trial by jury of not less than six persons.

According to the US Government Publishing Office, in "imprisonment for a term of one year and a fine of $5,000, or both" in paragraph 7, "and" should probably be "or."

The act also requires tribal courts to afford due process and other civil liberties. Also, Native American courts try to provide a setting similar to that of a US courtroom, which is familiar to lawyers. That aided the attorneys and helped to divert non-Indian ridicule and established the view that tribal courts were legitimate courts. Tribal courts adopted rules of evidence, pleading, and other requirements similar to those in state and federal courts.

The ICRA incorporated many constitutional protections, but it modified others or did not include them at all: "The law did not impose the establishment clause, the guarantee of a republican form of government, the requirement of a separation of church and state, the right to a jury trial in civil cases, or the right of indigents to appointed counsel in criminal cases." The provisions were excluded because the government recognized the different political and cultural status of the tribes.

Even though the federal government respected their individuality in this respect, the establishment of the ICRA caused the tribal governments to "mirror" modern American courts and procedures.

The impact of ICRA was greatly limited by the Supreme Court by the Santa Clara Pueblo v. Martinez court case (1978). Martinez involved a request to stop denying tribal membership to those children born to female (not male) tribal members who married outside of the tribe. The mother who brought the case pleaded that the discrimination against her child was solely based on sex, which violated the ICRA. The courts decided that "tribal common-law sovereign immunity prevented a suit against the tribe." Martinez ultimately strengthened tribal self-determination by further proving that generally, the federal government played no enforcement role over the tribal governments.

=== Title III—model code governing courts of Indian offenses ===
The Secretary of Interior is supposed to recommend (to Congress) a model code to govern the administration of justice when it comes to Indian offenses on Indian reservations on July 1, 1968. The title also mentions some provisions for individuals being tried in the court of Indian offenses:

- Any individual being tried shall have the same rights, privileges, and immunities as any other individual granted by the United States Constitution.
- Any individual being tried will be advised and made aware of these rights and any other tribal constitution applicable.
- Establish proper qualifications for the office of judge
- Provide training for judges through educational classes

In order to carry out these provisions, the Secretary of Interior was also encouraged to consult with Indians, Indian tribes, and agencies of the U.S.

=== Title IV—jurisdiction over criminal and civil actions ===
Section 401 covers assumptions by states. It's the main foundation for Indian rights. It states that Indians shall not be alienated or deprived of any right, privilege, or immunity afforded under Federal treaty, agreement, or statute with respect to hunting, trapping, or fishing or the control, licensing, or regulation.

Section 402 covers assumptions by states of civil jurisdiction. The main point to focus on here is to note how the States don't have jurisdiction over civil causes of action between Indians or Indian parties. However, this section also brings up more Indian rights. It states that nothing shall authorize the alienation, encumbrance, or taxation of any real or personal property, including water rights, belonging to any Indian or any Indian tribe, band, or community.

Section 403 covers retrocession of jurisdiction by states. The United States is authorized to accept a retrocession by any state of all or any measure of the criminal or civil jurisdiction (or both).

Section 404 covers consent to amend state laws. The United States is given to the people of any state to amend their state constitution or existing statutes, in order to remove any legal impediment to the assumption of civil or criminal jurisdiction in accordance with the provisions of this title.

Section 405 covers actions not to abate. It states that no action pending immediately prior to any cession of jurisdiction shall abate by reason of that section. For the action or proceeding, such cession shall take place on the day after the date of the final determination of the action or proceeding. Also, it states that no cession made by the United States shall deprive any court to hear, determine, render judgment, or impose sentence in any criminal action instituted against any person for any offense committed.

Section 406 covers special elections. State jurisdiction is created by a majority vote of adult Indians in a special election. For this special election, the Secretary of the Interior calls the rules and regulations for the election, when the tribal council or other governing body requests to do so.

=== Title V—offenses within Indian country ===
Amends section 1153 of title 18 of the United States Code. With the new addition, it reads: "weapon assault resulting in serious bodily injury".

=== Title VI—employment of legal counsel ===
An Indian, Indian tribe, Indian council, or any group of Indians have a right for the employment of legal counsel, and includes the choice of counsel and the fixing of fees. If any application made requiring the approval of the Secretary of Interior or the Commissioner of Indian Affairs is not granted or denied within 90 days, then the approval shall be deemed to have been granted.

=== Title VII—materials relating to constitutional rights of Indians ===
In this title, there are two materials mentioned to help strengthen the constitutional rights of Native Americans: "Indian Affairs, Laws and Treaties" and "Federal Indian Law". This Act only mentions for these documents to be revised and printed on September 1, 1967. However, it is crucial to truly understand what these materials contain.

The "Indian Affairs, Laws and Treaties" material is full of treaties between Natives and the U.S. government. For this bill, however, the protection was originally created by the Treaty of Peace between the Navajo Indian Tribe and the United States. On June 1, 1868, with the signing by 29 Navajo headmen and 10 officers of the United States Army, the sovereignty of the Navajo Tribe was officially recognized. (It was later ratified by the Senate on July 23 and proclaimed by President Andrew Johnson on August 12). With this treaty, it brought the end to a four-year period of the hardships and exile brought upon the Navajo Tribe.

On May 17, 1968, Congress, with a joint resolution, requested the President for a centennial signing of the treaty. Therefore, President Lyndon B. Johnson established the centennial of the signing of the 1868 Treaty of Peace between the Navajo Indian Tribe and the United States.

The "Federal Indian Law" material, on the other hand, is much broader than the other source. Basically, "Federal Indian Law" contains treaties, statutes, executive orders, administrative decisions and court cases that defines the political and legal status of federally recognized Native Americans. Within this material, the relationship of tribes and the U.S. government is defined as well as what the role of tribes are in states and the federal government. The three fundamental legal principles* in "Federal Indian Law" are:

1. American Indian and Alaska Native tribes that are recognized by the federal government are independent sovereign governments, separate from the states and from the federal government.
2. Unless Congress provides otherwise, the sovereignty of federally recognized American Indian and Alaska Native tribes generally extends over their federally recognized geographic territory (e.g., reservations, allotments, trust and restricted Indian lands, and other Indian country), including over the activities and conduct of tribal members and non-tribal members within that territory
3. The sovereignty of federally recognized American Indian and Alaska Native tribes is inherent and exists unless and until Congress takes it away.

*Note: The legal principles are sourced from the "Federal Indian Law" material, resourced from the "Federal Indian Law and Policy Affecting American Indian and Alaska Native Education" document

=== Title VIII—fair housing ===
The 1968 Fair Housing Act is a federal act in the United States intended to protect the buyer or renter of a dwelling from seller or landlord discrimination. Its primary prohibition makes it unlawful to refuse to sell, rent to, or negotiate with any person because of that person's inclusion in a protected class. The goal is a unitary housing market in which a person's background (as opposed to financial resources) does not arbitrarily restrict access. Calls for open housing were issued early in the twentieth century, but it was not until after World War II that concerted efforts to achieve it were undertaken.

The legislation was the culmination of a civil rights campaign against housing discrimination in the United States, including the 1966 Chicago open housing movement, and was approved by President Lyndon B. Johnson one week after the assassination of Martin Luther King Jr.

The Fair Housing Act was enacted as Title VIII of the Civil Rights Act of 1968, and codified at 42 U.S.C. 3601-3619, with penalties for violation at 42 U.S.C. 3631. It is enforced by the United States Department of Housing and Urban Development.

==== Summary ====
The Fair Housing Act (Title VIII of the Civil Rights Act of 1968) introduced meaningful federal enforcement mechanisms. It outlaws:

- Refusal to sell or rent a dwelling to any person because of race, color, disability, religion, sex, familial status, or national origin.
- Discrimination based on race, color, religion, sex, disability, familial status, or national origin in the terms, conditions or privileges of sale or rental of a dwelling.
- Advertising the sale or rental of a dwelling indicating preference, limitation, or discrimination based on race, color, religion, sex, handicap, familial status, disability or national origin.
- Coercing, threatening, intimidating, or interfering with a person's enjoyment or exercise of housing rights based on discriminatory reasons or retaliating against a person or organization that aids or encourages the exercise or enjoyment of fair housing rights.

A guide to legal and illegal acts in selling one's home under the Act is available here:

When the Fair Housing Act was first enacted, it prohibited discrimination only on the basis of race, color, religion, and national origin. Sex was added as a protected characteristic in 1974. In 1988, disability and familial status (the presence or anticipated presence of children under 18 in a household) were added (further codified in the Americans with Disabilities Act of 1990). In certain circumstances, the law allows limited exceptions for discrimination based on sex, religion, or familial status.

In 2017, a federal judge ruled that sexual orientation and gender identity are protected classes under the Fair Housing Act. As of May 2018, there is an additional pending effort to amend the Fair Housing Act to make this explicit (HR 1447). In a meeting on May 16, 2018, with the National Association of Realtors (NAR), Rep. Dana Rohrabacher (R-Calif.), who was campaigning for his 16th term, said he believed that homeowners should be allowed to refuse to sell their home to gay and lesbian homebuyers. The NAR disagreed and withdrew its endorsement of the Congressman over the matter.

The United States Department of Housing and Urban Development is the federal executive department with the statutory authority to administer and enforce the Fair Housing Act. The Secretary of Housing and Urban Development has delegated fair housing enforcement and compliance activities to HUD's Office of Fair Housing and Equal Opportunity (FHEO) and HUD's Office of General Counsel. FHEO is one of the United States' largest federal civil rights agencies. It has a staff of more than 600 people located in 54 offices around the United States. The Assistant Secretary for Fair Housing and Equal Opportunity serves as the head of FHEO, a position currently held by, Craig Trainor, whose appointment was confirmed on October 8, 2025.

Individuals who believe they have experienced housing discrimination can file a complaint with FHEO at no charge. FHEO funds and has working agreements with many state and local governmental agencies where "substantially equivalent" fair housing laws are in place. Under such agreements, FHEO refers complaints to the state or locality where the alleged incident occurred, and those agencies investigate and process the case instead of FHEO. That is known as FHEO's Fair Housing Assistance Program (or "FHAP").

There is also a network of private, non-profit fair housing advocacy organizations throughout the country. Some are funded by FHEO's Fair Housing Initiatives Program (or "FHIP"), and some operate with private donations or grants from other sources.

Victims of housing discrimination need not go through HUD or any other governmental agency to pursue their rights, however. The Fair Housing Act confers jurisdiction to hear cases on federal district courts. The United States Department of Justice also has jurisdiction to file cases on behalf of the United States where there is a pattern and practice of discrimination or where HUD has found discrimination in a case and either party elects to go to federal court instead of continuing in the HUD administrative process.

The Fair Housing Act applies to landlords renting or leasing space in their primary residence only if the residence contains living quarters occupied or intended to be occupied by three or more other families living independently of each other, such as an owner-occupied rooming house. Restrictions on discriminatory advertising do apply to all landlords without reservation.

==== Enforcement ====
The Fair Housing Act has been strengthened since its adoption in 1968, but enforcement continues to be a concern among housing advocates. According to a 2010 evaluation of Analysis of Impediments (AI) reports done by the Government Accountability Office, enforcement is particularly inconsistent across local jurisdictions.

=== Title IX—prevention of intimidation in fair housing cases ===
As the title states, this section of the bill sets the standard for preventing any kind of threat of force by someone who willfully injures, intimidates, interferes with or even attempts any of these actions upon a person of color (full discrimination set as race, color, religion, or national origin) when the minority in question is:

- Selling, purchasing, renting, financing, occupying, contracting, or negotiating for the sale
- Applying for or participating in any service, organization, or facility relating to the business of selling or renting dwellings
- Participating or encouraging others to participate in any of the activities, services, organizations or facilities
- Participating lawfully in speech or peaceful assembly

Any citizen who has been ordered to discourage these citizens from aiding/encouraging other persons to participate without discrimination in any activities listed above will be:

- Fined $1,000 or imprisoned for a year (or both)
- Fined $10,000 or imprisoned for ten years (or both) if there was any sort of bodily injury
- Imprisoned for any term of years or for life if death has occurred

=== Title X—civil obedience ===
Section 231 covers civil disorders. The civil disorders mentioned in this section are:

- Teaching or demonstrating to any other person the use, application, or making of any firearm or explosive or incendiary device, or technique capable of causing injury or death to people
- Transporting or manufacturing for transportation in commerce any firearm, or explosive or incendiary device, knowing that it will be used in furtherance of a civil disorder

Whoever commits or attempts to commit any of these acts will be fined no more than $10,000 or imprisoned no more than 5 years, or both.

Section 232 covers definitions in this title. The definitions that are defined are: civil disorder, commerce, federally protested function, firearm, explosive or incendiary device, and law enforcement officer.

Section 233 covers preemption. None of the provisions contained in the title are intended on the part of Congress to occupy the state or local laws with the same subject matter nor are constructed to invalidate any provision of state law unless it is inconsistent. This section also holds an edit for the United States Code, where a chapter called Civil Disorders is inserted.

== Amendments ==
In 1988, Congress voted to weaken the ability of plaintiffs to prosecute cases of housing discrimination. But the Fair Housing Act was also amended in 1988 to allow plaintiffs' attorneys to recover attorney's fees. Additionally, the 1988 amendment added people with disabilities and families with children to the classes covered by the Act.

== Case law ==
In the early 1990s, in Trouillon v. City of Hawthorne, the NAACP Legal Defense and Educational Fund successfully challenged an urban renewal plan on the basis of race discrimination by bringing suit under the Fair Housing Act. Previous litigation under the Act had largely been limited to discrimination in buying or renting housing.

Although he ruled in favor of the plaintiffs, Judge Davis nevertheless disputed the allegations of discrimination. He said he based his ruling in part on the city's failure to prove that the area had a higher crime rate and lower property values than other parts of the city. The city "did not act in bad faith or fraudulently," Davis wrote. It "did not discriminate against any minority or low or moderate income person and did not violate any person's Due Process, Equal Protection or other Civil Rights."

The Anti-Riot Act of Title I had been rarely used; it notably had been used to prosecute the Chicago Seven, but had not faced strict legal scrutiny. In the late 2010s, with growing concerns over activities of the far right, white nationalists, and white supremacists, the Anti-Riot Act had been used to prosecute organizers of various rallies that had turned violent, such as the Unite the Right rally in 2017. However, in June 2019, a federal district court in California, overseeing the case of members of the Rise Above Movement related to both the Unite the Right rally and other protests in California, ruled that the Anti-Riot Act was unconstitutional in that it was "overbroad in violation of the First Amendment."

== Legacy ==
National Fair Housing Month honors the Fair Housing Act in April, the month of its passage.

=== U.S. states ===
==== New York State Human Rights Law ====
Extends the protection to marital status and age, aimed to prevent non-racial discrimination.

==== Section 236 and 237 of the New York State Property Law ====
Further extends the protection to include dwellings with children and mobile home parks. That is meant to protect renters and sellers from discriminating based on number of children in a family. Currently the Fair Housing Act protects against discrimination of race, color, national origin, religion, sex, familial status, and disability. The law applies to all types of housing, rental homes, apartments, condos and houses. The only exception to the act is if an owner of a small rental building lives in the same building he lets. Since he owns the building and also resides there, he can decide who lives there.

=== Violations of the Fair Housing Act ===
There are an estimated 2 million cases of housing discrimination each year according to HUD. The National Fair Housing Alliance, the largest fair housing non-profit in the country, estimates that number to be closer to 4 million per year, excluding instances of discrimination due to disability or familial status. Housing projects have also come under fire by researchers and NGOs alike. Housing advocates Elizabeth Julian and Michael Daniel state:

in addition to the inequality in the actual housing provided to low-income African-American families under the federal programs, the neighborhoods in which they receive assistance are usually subject to various adverse conditions not found in the neighborhoods surrounding the housing units in which whites receive the same assistance. The conditions include inferior city-provided facilities and services, little or no new or newer residential housing, large numbers of seriously substandard structures, noxious environmental conditions, substandard or completely absent neighborhood service facilities, high crime rates, inadequate access to job centers, and little or no investment of new capital in the area by public and private entities.

== See also ==
- Executive Order 11063
- Public housing in the United States
- Racial segregation in the United States
- Racial steering
- Redlining
- Jones v. Alfred H. Mayer Co.
- Fair Housing Council of San Fernando Valley v. Roommates.com, LLC
- Texas Department of Housing and Community Affairs v. Inclusive Communities Project, Inc.
- Meyer v. Holley
- Chicago Lawyers' Committee For Civil Rights Under Law v. Craigslist, Inc.
- Stuyvesant Town–Peter Cooper Village#Controversy - Post-war project that was involved in controversy for refusing to admit African-Americans.
- Buchanan v. Warley
- Department of Fair Employment and Housing
- Seattle movement (Fair housing campaign in the 1960s)
- Native American civil rights

== Bibliography ==
- Kotz, Nick (2006). Judgment Days: Lyndon Baines Johnson, Martin Luther King Jr., and the Laws That Changed America. Houghton Mifflin. ISBN 9780618088256.
- Shapiro, Steven R. (1993). Human Rights Violations in the United States: A Report on U.S. Compliance with The International Covenant on Civil and Political Rights. Human Rights Watch. ISBN 9781564321220.
