= Seattle movement =

Part of the Civil Rights Movement in the United States

- Part of the Civil Rights Movement
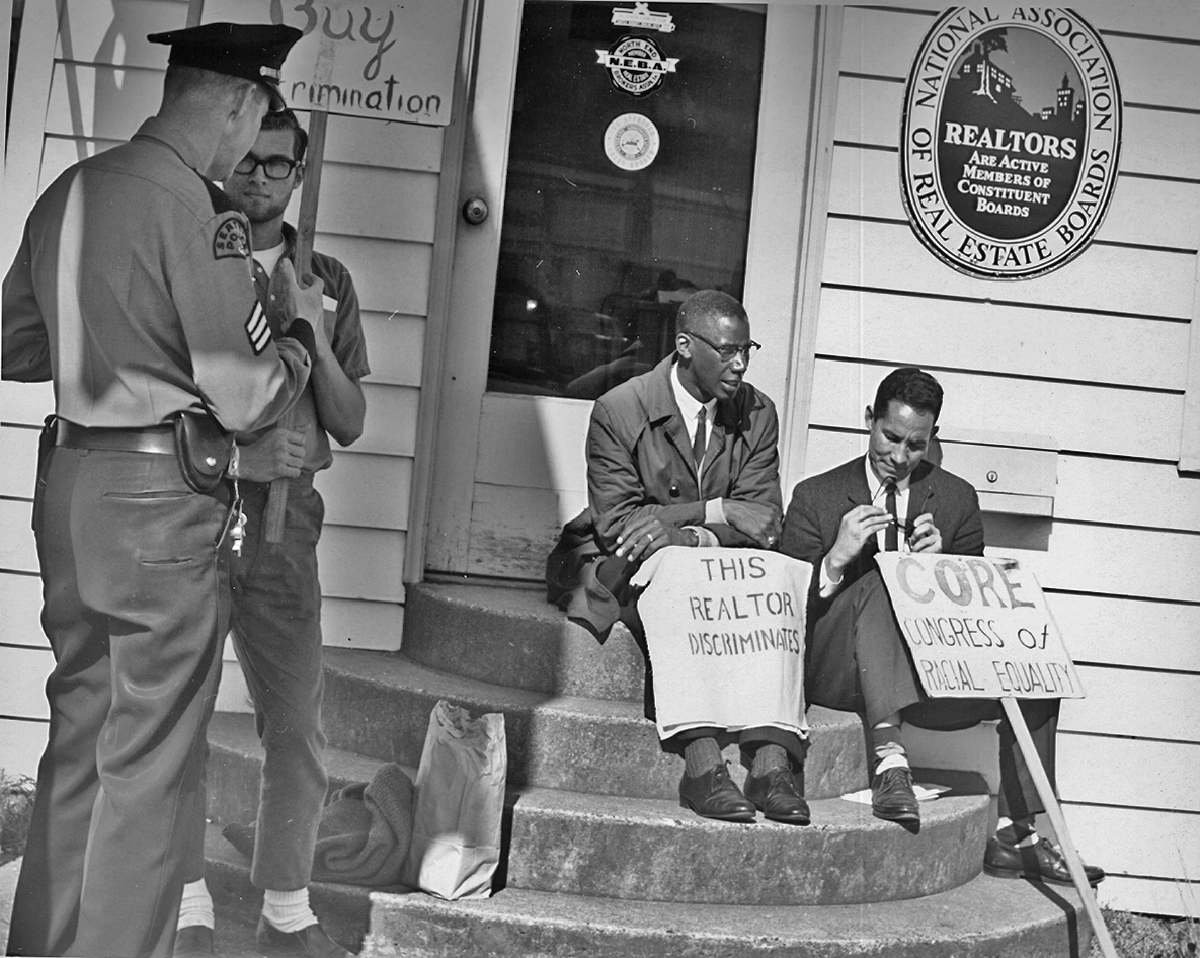
- Fair housing protest, Seattle, 1964
- Location: Seattle, Washington

The Seattle movement was part of the wider Civil Rights Movement, taking place in Seattle, Washington in the 1960s.

The movement was reliant on several intersecting movements led by Filipino Americans, Japanese Americans, Chinese Americans, Jews, Latinos, and Native Americans, and the working class. From the 1910s through the 1970s, labor and civil rights were linked in complicated ways, with some unions and radical organizations providing critical support to struggles for racial justice, while others stood in the way.

Seattle’s 19th-century American population grew from a single person in 1858 to 406 women and men by 1900. The pioneers set forth the first black churches, businesses and civil rights organizations.

== History ==
=== Segregationist past ===
For most of its history, Seattle was a segregated city committed to white supremacy. People of color were excluded from most jobs, most neighborhoods and schools, and many stores, restaurants, hotels, and other commercial establishments, even hospitals. As in other western states, the system of severe racial discrimination in Seattle targeted not just African Americans but also Native Americans, Asian Americans, Pacific Islanders, people of Mexican ancestry, and also, at times, Jews and Italians. Individuals of African American descent were treated worse than any other minority based on the fact that there was a smaller number compared. During World War II, thousands of black migrants from the South began arriving in Seattle to find work in munitions factories and shipyards during the Second Great Migration. As a result, the number of African Americans in the city grew from 3,700 in 1940 to 15,000 in 1950 and the NAACP Chapter in Seattle grew from 75 members to 1,500 in 1945.

=== Greater Seattle Housing Council ===
In 1956, Seattle's Civic Unity Committee created the Greater Seattle Housing Council, intending to encourage dialogue between proponents of open housing (i.e. racially integrated housing) and the real estate industry. At this time, talks were fruitless. The following year, Washington State passed an Omnibus Civil Rights Act that provided that housing that had current federal or state government loans could not discriminate on the basis of race. In 1959, this was challenged in King County Superior Court.

The civil rights campaign in Seattle stepped up in October 1961, when the Seattle Employment Discrimination campaign urged selective buying with campaigns referred to as well a "shoe-in" and a "shop-in." In this same time frame, the NAACP requested an open housing ordinance. The Seattle City Council convened a public hearing on the matter on December 11, 1961, but declined to act, recommending instead that supporters of such a law organize a ballot initiative.

Rather than focus immediately on legislation, proponents of open housing pursued a different channel in the short run: in the summer of 1962, 24 organizations created the Fair Housing Listing Service (FHLS) to bring blacks who wished to purchase housing outside of Seattle's historically black Central District together with white homeowners willing to sell to minorities. By the beginning of 1965, FHLS negotiated 50 such sales.

On December 17, 1962, the Mayor's Citizen's Advisory Committee on Minority Housing recommended that an open housing ordinance be submitted to city council, but the mayor and council delayed all action for a year. That year would prove eventful.

The Urban League and NAACP resigned from the Greater Seattle Housing Council because they believed had been ineffective in housing matters. A new committee was formed, the Central Area Civil Rights Committee (CACRC). 400 people participated in a protest march July 1, 1963, and 35 youth from the interracial Central District Youth Club staged Seattle's first sit-in, a nearly 24-hour occupation of the mayor's office. That very day the city council and mayor proposed a Seattle Human Rights Commission, which was established July 17 (City Ordinance 92191). The commission was authorized to draft open housing ordinance. This did not prevent a July 20 sit-in in the council chambers.

=== Public schools ===
On August 28, 1963, the same day as Martin Luther King Jr.'s March on Washington for Jobs and Freedom, 1,000 demonstrators marched from Seattle's First AME Church to the Federal Courthouse. Also that same day, Seattle Public Schools became the country's first major school system to initiate a voluntary desegregation plan. A week later, September 3, 1963, the Seattle Human Rights Commission recommended an ordinance against discrimination in housing sales, rentals, and financing.

=== Open housing bill ===
An October 20 March in support of open housing drew 1,200 people. Five days later, the city council, meeting as a Committee of the Whole, held a public hearing on the open housing bill recommended by the Seattle Human Rights Commission. The bill was approved 7-2, but was stripped of the emergency clause that would have made a council vote sufficient to turn the bill immediately into law without the possibility of being overturned by a referendum. As would have been the case with or without an emergency clause, the Committee of the Whole sent the bill to the council as such (the same people) for a final vote. The two council votes against the final version of the bill were Wing Luke and Charles M. Carroll, both opposing it because the emergency clause had been taken out.

On November 27, 1963 the council approved the bill (as Ordinance 92497) by the same 7–2 margin, without the emergency clause. On December 9, 1963, Ordinance 92533 submitted Ordinance 92497 to the voters by charter referendum as part of a general election on March 10, 1964.

However, prospects did not bode well. On February 12, 1964 voters in nearby Tacoma, Washington defeated similar legislation by a margin of 3-1. On March 7, three days before the referendum vote, over 1,500 attended an open housing rally, marching from several places around the city to Westlake Plaza, but the March 10 election saw the ordinance go down to defeat, 115,627 to 54,448, as J. Dorm Braman, an opponent of open housing, was elected mayor of Seattle, defeating open housing supporter John Cherberg.

=== Congress of Racial Equality ===
In summer 1964, the Freedom Summer was occurring in Mississippi and (on July 2) President Lyndon B. Johnson signed the Civil Rights Act of 1964. In Seattle, the Congress of Racial Equality (CORE) initiated the Drive for Equal Employment in Downtown Stores (DEEDS), with a goal that minorities would constitute 24% of new hires in those stores. Through January 1965, these stores were subjected to boycotts. CORE also organized pickets and sit-ins at local real estate industry offices, but a court-ordered injunction terminated the latter protests.

=== Freedom March ===
Thirteen days after Bloody Sunday (March 7, 1965, when the Selma to Montgomery marches in Alabama came under violent attack), more than 600 people in Seattle—a group slightly larger than the Selma-to-Montgomery march itself—took part in a "Freedom March" in support of the Selma marchers. Marching from the First AME Church to the Federal Courthouse, under the leadership of the NAACP, they demanded open housing legislation and equal job opportunities.

Seattle's open housing forces took a blow when, on May 15, 1965, just before the summer of the Voting Rights Act and the Watts Riots, an airplane crash killed Sidney Gerber and city council member Wing Luke. Gerber had founded Harmony Homes, which by that time had built 15 homes for African Americans in previously all-white Seattle neighborhoods.

Momentum was regained two years later, when on June 8, 1967 the Seattle Urban League initiated the three-year Operation Equality. Operation Equality provided counsel to minorities seeking housing, sponsored educational projects, and worked with fair housing groups to list available housing. It was the second such project in the United States to receive a Ford Foundation grant.

Later that year, Sam Smith (politician) won a Seattle City Council seat in the November election, becoming the first African American to serve on the council.

=== Civil Rights Act of 1968 ===
On April 11, 1968, one week after the assassination of Martin Luther King Jr., President Johnson signed the Civil Rights Act of 1968. Fair housing had become federal policy, and Seattle had lost its opportunity to get out in front of the federal government on the matter. Eight days later, on April 19, 1968, the Seattle City Council unanimously passed a fair housing ordinance (Ordinance 96619). This time, sponsored by Smith and five other members of the 9-member council, it passed with an emergency clause, making it impossible to appeal by referendum by the voters.

Over the years, the legislation would be broadened further. In 1975, discrimination based on sex, marital status, sexual orientation, and political ideology were outlawed. In 1979, parental status was added; in 1986, creed and disability; and in 1999 gender identity.

== See also ==
- Seattle school boycott of 1966
- Seattle Civil Rights and Labor History Project

== Archives ==
- Civic Unity Committee Records. 1938-1965. 24.76 cubic feet (58 boxes). Contains records relating to the Greater Seattle Housing Council. At the Labor Archives of Washington, University of Washington Libraries Special Collections.
- Arthur G. Barnett Papers. 1920-1997. 11.76 cubic feet including 5 cassette tapes, 1 oversize vertical file, 2 film reels, 1 videocassette and 1 microfilm reel. At the Labor Archives of Washington, University of Washington Libraries Special Collections.
