= Anna Maria Farias =

American lawyer and government official

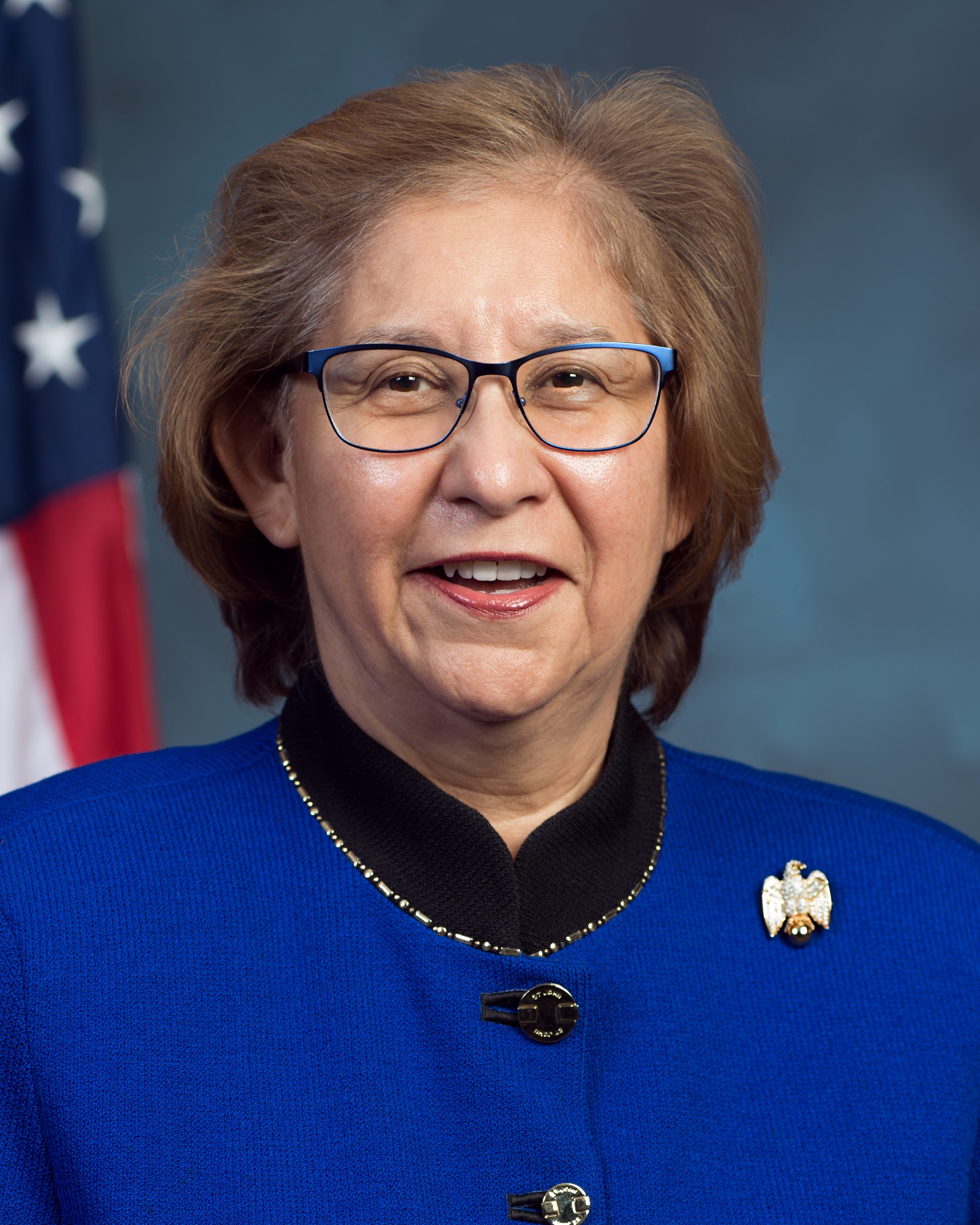

Assistant Secretary of Housing and Urban Development for Fair Housing and Equal Opportunity
- In office August 22, 2017 – January 20, 2021
- President: Donald Trump
- Preceded by: Gustavo Velasquez
- Succeeded by: Jeanine Worden (acting) Craig Trainor (permanent)

Personal details
- Born: Crystal City, Texas
- Party: Republican
- Education: Boston University; Temple University Beasley School of Law

Anna Maria Farias (born 1952) is an American lawyer and former government official who served as the Assistant Secretary of Housing and Urban Development for Fair Housing and Equal Opportunity from 2017—2021. Before this, Farias served as vice chair of the Republican Party of Bexar County, Texas from 2015 through 2017. Farias is also chair of the Board of Regents at Texas Woman's University.

== Early life and education ==
Farias grew up in the housing projects of Crystal City, Texas. She was high school valedictorian and earned a scholarship to attend Boston University, where she received a B.A. with honors. Farias has a J.D. from Temple University Beasley School of Law and was a fellow at Harvard University's John F. Kennedy School of Government.

== Career ==
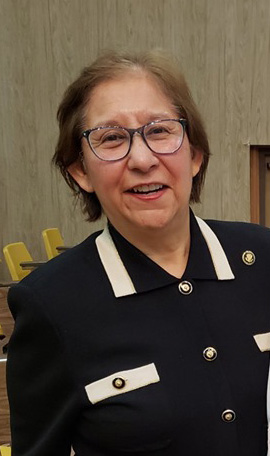
Farias attending the 2019 Multifamily Legal Seminar at the South Texas College of Law in Houston, Texas

From 1980 to 1985, Farias was an attorney with the United States Merit Systems Protection Board. From 1985 to 1988, she worked for United States Secretary of Education William Bennett. Farias served as counsel to a member of the National Labor Relations Board from 1989 to 1992. From 1992 to 1993, she was a member of the Wage Appeals Board and Board of Service Contract Appeals at the United States Department of Labor. From 1993 through 2000, Farias was executive director of the Housing Authority of Crystal City, Texas, her hometown.

From 2001 to 2008, Farias served as senior counsel to former United States Secretary of Housing and Urban Development Mel Martínez and as Deputy Assistant Secretary for Special Initiatives, Deputy Assistant Secretary for Grant Programs, and Director for the White House Office of Faith-Based and Neighborhood Partnerships.

Farias serves on the board of directors for the One Star Foundation in Austin, Texas. She was inducted into the Texas Women's Hall of Fame in 2000. Farias served as vice chair of the Republican Party of Bexar County, Texas from 2015 to 2017, when she was confirmed by the United States Senate as Assistant Secretary of Housing and Urban Development for Fair Housing and Equal Opportunity. She is the current chairwoman of the Board of Regents at Texas Woman's University.
