= Shani Mott =

American scholar (1976–2024)

Shani Tahir Mott
- Born: March 16, 1976; Chicago, Illinois, U.S.
- Died: March 12, 2024 (aged 47); Baltimore, Maryland, U.S.
- Occupations: Scholar, activist

Academic background
- Education: Wesleyan University (B.A.), University of Michigan (M.A., Ph.D.)

Academic work
- Institutions: Johns Hopkins University
- Main interests: Black Studies • Race and Power Dynamics • Institutional Bias

Shani Tahir Mott (March 16, 1976 – March 12, 2024) was an American scholar of Black studies, best known for her advocacy and her examination of race and power in the United States. Her dissertation analysed how 20th century nonfiction and fiction writers strategically used racial vocabulary in American popular culture to explore sexuality, economic inequality and political power. She was a faculty member at Johns Hopkins University. Her academic work in literature and Africana studies, extended beyond traditional scholarship to actionable advocacy, highlighted by her legal challenge against discriminatory home appraisal practices in Baltimore. Her family home was severely undervalued and she was also denied a refinance loan. When her home was shown by a white colleague, it was appraised to be worth $278,000 more than the original value she was told. After discovering this bias, Dr. Mott and her Husband sued the mortgage company, the appraisal company, and the apprasier who came to see the house. Currently, the case with the appraisal company and appraiser is pending while the mortgage company agreed to a settlement. Before working at Johns Hopkins University, she taught in Barry University's English department, where she designed a secondary school curriculum focusing on racial literacy and American literature. Furthermore, she would create children's storytime videos on YouTube alongside her husband and children.She would also consult on teaching and mentoring at Barry University while she was there. Additionally, she founded and served in diversity-focused initiatives, including establishing a social justice collective at Johns Hopkins University and a diversity program at the Bryn Mawr School. She died from adrenal cancer on March 12, 2024, at the age of 47. In the days before her death, she continued to advocate by testifying in support of her lawsuit against LoanDepot. As a result, the case settled with sweeping changes in home appraisal practices including extensive plan to mitigate discrimination including a second appraisal.
