= Gustavo Velasquez =

Mexican-American government official

Gustavo F. Velasquez-Aguilar
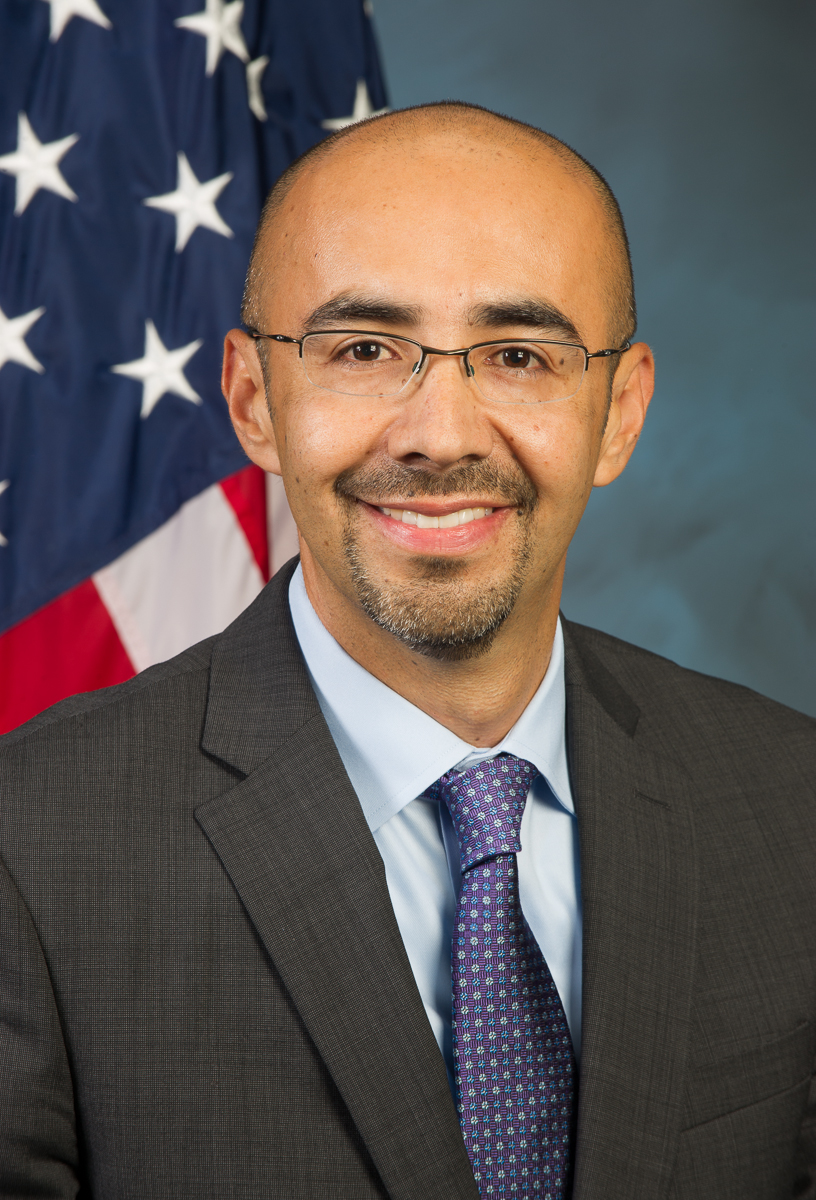

Assistant Secretary of Housing and Urban Development for Fair Housing and Equal Opportunity
- In office June 24, 2014 – January 20, 2017
- President: Barack Obama
- Preceded by: John D. Trasviña
- Succeeded by: Anna María Farías

Personal details
- Born: December 1, 1972 (age 53) Oaxaca, Mexico
- Party: Democratic
- Children: 2
- Education: University of Pennsylvania (BA, MPA)

Gustavo F. Velasquez-Aguilar is the Director of the California Department of Housing & Community Development. Between 2014 and 2017, Velasquez-Aguilar served as the Assistant Secretary of the Office of Fair Housing and Equal Opportunity in the U.S. Department of Housing and Urban Development.

== Education ==
Velasquez-Aguilar was born in Oaxaca, Mexico. He received degrees from the University of Pennsylvania; B.A. in Public Administration and Political science; Master's degree in Government Administration. He also completed the Executive Program on Strategic Planning and Business Transformation at the University of Pennsylvania's Wharton School of Business.

== Career ==
He worked for Congreso de Latinos Unidos in Philadelphia, as well as was Director of District of Columbia Office of Latino Affairs (OLA) and the Office of Human Rights (OHR). He was executive director of the Latino Economic Development Center (LEDC) in the District of Columbia.

On January 16, 2014, President Obama nominated Velasquez-Aguilar for Assistant Secretary of the Office of Fair Housing and Equal Opportunity in the U.S. Department of Housing and Urban Development. His nomination was confirmed by the U.S. Senate on June 19, 2014. Velasquez-Aguilar served in this role until January 20, 2017.

On April 2, 2020, California Governor Gavin Newsom appointed Velasquez-Aguilar the Director of the Department of Housing & Community Development.
