= Meyer v. Holley =

- Supreme Court of the United States

Argued December 3, 2002 Decided January 22, 2003
- Full case name: Meyer v. Holley et al.
- Citations: 537 U.S. 280 (more) 123 S. Ct. 824; 154 L. Ed. 2d 753

Case history
- Prior: Holley v. Crank, 258 F.3d 1127 (9th Cir. 2001); cert. granted, 535 U.S. 1077 (2002).

Court membership
- Chief Justice William Rehnquist Associate Justices John P. Stevens · Sandra Day O'Connor; Antonin Scalia · Anthony Kennedy; David Souter · Clarence Thomas; Ruth Bader Ginsburg · Stephen Breyer

Case opinion
- Majority: Breyer, joined by unanimous

Laws applied
- Fair Housing Act (42 U.S.C. § 3604(b); 42 U.S.C. § 3605(a))

Meyer v. Holley, 537 U.S. 280 (2003), was a case in which the Supreme Court of the United States held that the Fair Housing Act imposes strict liability on residential real estate corporations for racial discrimination, but the officers and owners of the corporation generally will not be held vicariously liable for offenses committed by the corporation's employees of agents. In a unanimous opinion written by Justice Stephen Breyer, the Court held that the Fair Housing Act "imposes liability without fault upon the employer in accordance with traditional agency principles, i. e., it normally imposes vicarious liability upon the corporation but not upon its officers or owners."

== See also ==
- List of United States Supreme Court cases
- List of United States Supreme Court cases, volume 537
- List of United States Supreme Court cases by the Rehnquist Court
