= Fair Housing Initiatives Program =

U.S. federal grant program

The Fair Housing Initiatives Program (FHIP) is managed by the Office of Fair Housing and Equal Opportunity at the United States Department of Housing and Urban Development. The program provides funding to fair housing organizations and other non-profits who assist people who believe they have been victims of housing discrimination. The FHIP program is the only Federal grant program whose purpose is to support private partnerships in preventing and overcoming housing discrimination.

== History of the Program ==
The Fair Housing Initiatives Program began with the passage of Section 561 of the Housing and Community Development Act of 1987 (42 U.S.C. 3616; P.L. 100–242), as amended by the Housing and Community Development Act of 1992.

== Types of FHIP grants ==
- The Fair Housing Organizations Initiative (FHOI)- FHOI provides funding to existing non-profit fair housing organizations. The funding is intended to build capacity and effectiveness of these organizations by providing funds to handle fair housing enforcement and education initiatives. FHOI also strengthens the fair housing movement nationally by encouraging the creation and growth of organizations that focus on the rights and needs of underserved groups, particularly persons with disabilities.
- The Private Enforcement Initiative (PEI)- offers a range of assistance to the nationwide network of fair housing groups. This initiatives funds non-profit fair housing organizations to carry out testing and enforcement activities to prevent or eliminate discriminatory housing practices.
- The Education and Outreach Initiative (EOI)- This grant is meant to increase activities to local communities to teach about fair housing rights and responsibilities. These grants are given to State agencies, local government groups, and non-profit organizations for initiatives that explain to the general public and housing providers what equal opportunity in housing means and what housing providers need to do to comply with the Fair housing Act. In recent years, one of the main goals of the EOI grants is to protect the public from lending schemes that prey upon minority homeowners by educating the public about what they can do if they are facing foreclosure and how to be suspicious of foreclosure programs.

== Eligible grantees ==
- FHIP-FHOI: Applicants must be qualified fair housing enforcement organizations with at least two years of experience in complaint intake, complaint investigation, testing for fair housing violations, and meritorious claims in the three years prior to the filing of their application.
- FHIP-PEI: Fair housing enforcement organizations that meet certain requirements related to the length and quality of previous fair housing enforcement experience may apply for FHIP-PEI funding.
- FHIP-EOI: State or local governments, qualified fair housing enforcement organizations (those with at least 2 years of experience), other fair housing organizations, and other public or private nonprofit organizations representing groups of persons protected by the Fair Housing Act may apply for FHIP-EOI funding.

== See also ==
- Office of Fair Housing and Equal Opportunity
- Fair Housing Assistance Program
