= Office of Fair Housing and Equal Opportunity =

US Government agency

Office of Community Planning and Development
- Seal of the U.S. Department of Housing and Urban Development

Office overview
- Formed: 1968
- Jurisdiction: United States
- Headquarters: Robert C. Weaver Federal Building Washington, D.C.
- Office executive: Craig Trainor, Assistant Secretary for Fair Housing and Equal Opportunity
- Parent department: United States Department of Housing and Urban Development
- Key document: Code of Federal Regulations 24 CFR Chapter I
- Website: www.hud.gov

The Office of Fair Housing and Equal Opportunity (FHEO) is an agency within the United States Department of Housing and Urban Development. The FHEO is responsible for administering and enforcing federal fair housing laws and establishing policies that make sure all Americans have equal access to the housing of their choice, as described in the Fair Housing Act of 1968.

== Mission ==
The mission of the FHEO is to create equal housing opportunities for all persons living in America by administering laws that prohibit discrimination in housing on the basis of race, color, religion, sex, national origin, disability, and familial status.

== Organization ==
The FHEO consists of one headquarters office in the Department of Housing and Urban Development building in Washington, D.C. and has 10 regional offices across the country. The regional offices enforce fair housing laws; conduct training, outreach, and compliance monitoring; and work with state and local agencies to administer fair housing programs.

The headquarters office is responsible for proposing fair housing legislation; working with other government agencies on fair housing issues; reviewing and making comments on proposed rules, handbooks, legislation, draft reports, and notices of funding availability from other departments within the Department of Housing and Urban Development (HUD); interpret policy, process complaints, perform compliance reviews, and offer technical assistance to local housing authorities and community development agencies regarding Section 3 of the Housing and Urban Development Act on 1968; conduct oversight of the Government Sponsored Enterprises, Fannie Mae and Freddie Mac, to ensure consistency with the Fair Housing Act and the fair housing provisions of the Federal Housing Enterprises Financial Safety and Soundness Act; and work with private industry and community advocates on the promotion of voluntary fair housing compliance. In addition, the FHEO manages the Fair Housing Assistance Program and the Fair Housing Initiatives Program.

The FEHO is led by an Assistant Secretary of Housing and Urban Development for Fair Housing and Equal Opportunity, nominated by the President, with the advice and consent of the United States Senate. They oversee the following:

- Assistant Secretary of Housing and Urban Development for Fair Housing and Equal Opportunity
  - General Deputy Assistant Secretary
  - Deputy Assistant Secretary for Policy, Legislative Initiatives, and Outreach
  - Deputy Assistant Secretary for Operations and Management
  - Deputy Assistant Secretary for Enforcement Programs
  - Director, Office of Field Oversight
  - Director, Office of Information Services and Communications
  - Director, Office of Management, Planning and Budget
  - Director, Office of Administrative Services
  - Director, Office of Enforcement
  - Director, Office of Systemic Investigations
  - Director, Office of Programs

The current Assistant Secretary, confirmed by the Senate on October 8, 2025, is Craig Trainor.

== History ==
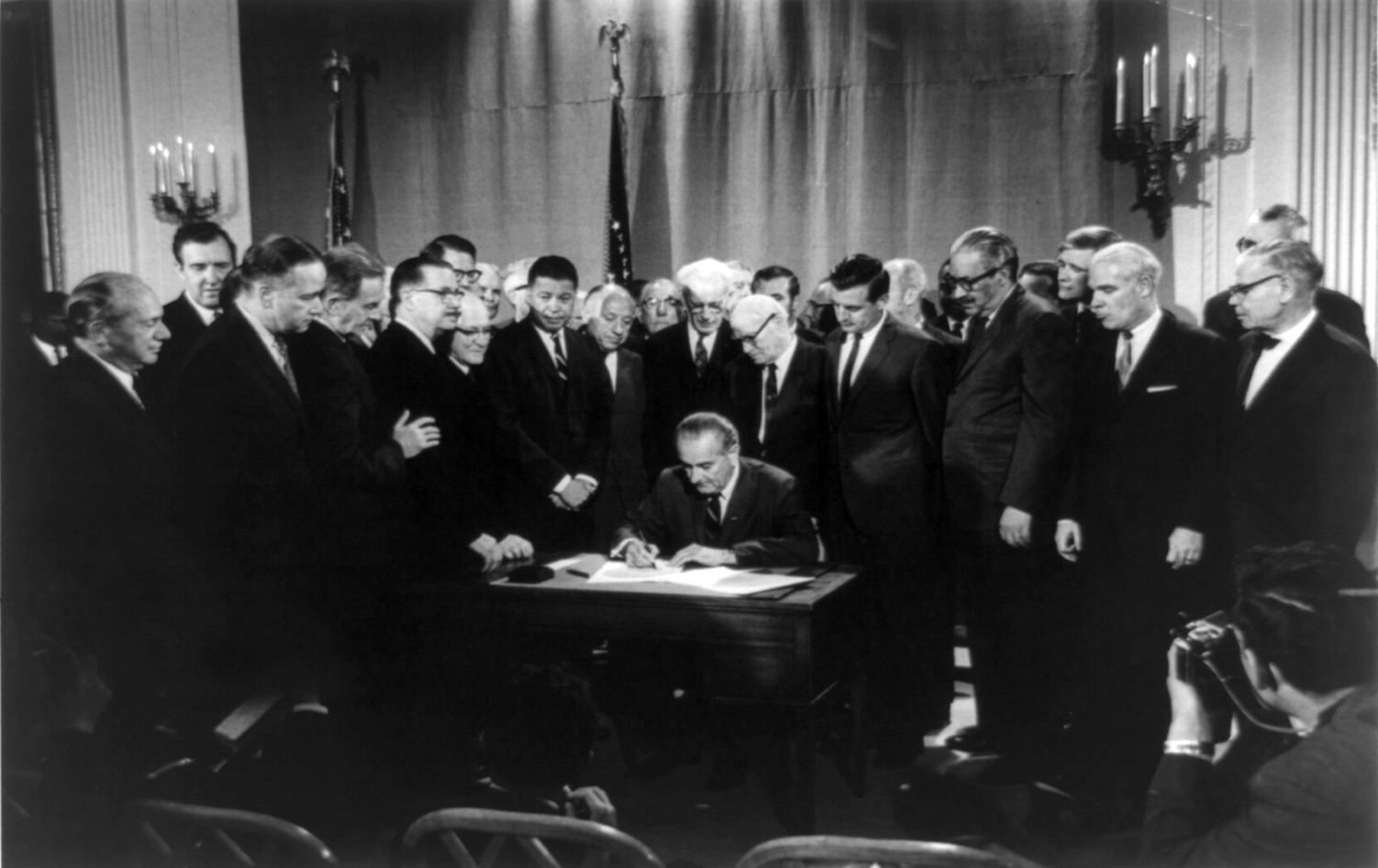
President Johnson signing the Civil Rights Act of 1968

The Office of Fair Housing and Equal Opportunity was created by the Civil Rights Act of 1968, also known as the Fair Housing Act, which sought to end discrimination in the sale, rental, and financing of housing based on race, color, religion, and national origin. The passage of the Act was contentious. The Fair Housing Act was meant to be a direct follow up to the Civil Rights Act of 1964, however from 1966 to 1967 Congress failed to garner enough political support for its passage. At that time several states had passed their own fair housing laws and Congress was not convinced that a federal law was necessary. It was only after the assassination of Martin Luther King Jr. on April 4, 1968, and the ensuing riots, that Congress finally passed the bill. It was signed into law on April 11, 1968, by President Lyndon B. Johnson. Johnson, who was one of the Act’s strongest supporters, called the new law one of the "promises of a century... it proclaims that fair housing for all—all human beings who live in this country—is now a part of the American way of life."

Since 1968, the Fair Housing Act has been amended twice. In 1974 sex was added as a protected characteristic. In 1988 the Act was amended again to further include protection for persons with disabilities and prohibit discrimination based on familial status. The amendment also strengthened the Act's enforcement provisions by allowing the aggrieved parties to seek remedy for their cases before a HUD Administrative Law Judge or in federal court. In addition, the amendment granted the Department of Justice the power to impose more severe punishments on those who violated the Act.

== Fair Housing Laws ==
The Office of Fair Housing and Equal Opportunity is responsible for enforcing a variety of fair housing laws, which prohibit discrimination in both privately owned and publicly assisted housing including:

- The Fair Housing Act: Title VIII of the Civil Rights Act of 1968 (Fair Housing Act), as amended, prohibits discrimination in the sale, rental, and financing of dwellings, and in other housing-related transactions, based on race, color, national origin, religion, sex, familial status (including children under the age of 18 living with parents or legal custodians, pregnant women, and people securing custody of children under the age of 18), and handicap (disability)
- Title VI of the Civil Rights Act of 1964: Title VI prohibits discrimination on the basis of race, color, or national origin in programs and activities receiving federal financial assistance.
- Section 504 of the Rehabilitation Act of 1973: Section 504 prohibits discrimination based on disability in any program or activity receiving federal financial assistance.
- Section 109 of Title 1 of the Housing and Community Development Act of 1974: Section 109 prohibits discrimination on the basis of race, color, national origin, sex or religion in programs and activities receiving financial assistance from HUD's Community Development and Block Grant Program.
- Title II of the Americans with Disabilities Act of 1990:Title II prohibits discrimination based on disability in programs, services, and activities provided or made available by public entities. HUD enforces Title II when it relates to state and local public housing, housing assistance and housing referrals.
- Architectural Barriers Act of 1968: The Architectural Barriers Act requires that buildings and facilities designed, constructed, altered, or leased with certain federal funds after September 1969 must be accessible to and usable by handicapped persons.
- Age Discrimination Act of 1975: The Age Discrimination Act prohibits discrimination on the basis of age in programs or activities receiving federal financial assistance.
- Title IX of the Education Amendments Act of 1972: Title IX prohibits discrimination on the basis of sex in education programs or activities that receive federal financial assistance.

=== Fair Housing-Related Presidential Executive Orders ===
- Executive Order 11063: prohibits discrimination in the sale, leasing, rental, or other disposition of properties and facilities owned or operated by the federal government or provided with federal funds

Executive Order 11246 as amended, bars discrimination in federal employment because of race, color, religion, sex, or national origin.

- Executive Order 12892 as amended, requires federal agencies to affirmatively further fair housing in their programs and activities, and provides that the Secretary of HUD will be responsible for coordinating the effort. The Order also establishes the President's Fair Housing Council, which will be chaired by the Secretary of HUD.
- Executive Order 12898 requires that each federal agency conduct its program, policies, and activities that substantially affect human health or the environment in a manner that does not exclude persons based on race, color, or national origin.
- Executive Order 13166-eliminates, to the extent possible, limited English proficiency as a barrier to full and meaningful participation by beneficiaries in all federally assisted and federally conducted programs and activities.
- Executive Order 13217 requires federal agencies to evaluate their policies and programs to determine if any can be revised or modified to improve the availability of community-based living arrangements for persons with disabilities.

== Fair Housing Hotline ==
One of the main functions of the FHEO is to provide an administrative complaint process that is available free of charge to any person who believes they have faced housing discrimination because of their race, color, national origin, religion, sex, familial status, or disability to voice their concerns. FHEO conducts intake of all housing-related discrimination complaints and conducts investigation. Any person who thinks they have experienced housing discrimination is encouraged to call the toll free Housing Discrimination Hotline.

== Fair Housing Month ==
Since the Fair Housing Act was passed on April 11, 1968, the Office of Fair Housing and Equal Opportunity has celebrated April as Fair Housing Month. Every April, state and local governments as well as non-profit organizations hold events and conduct activities to celebrate Fair Housing Month.

== Fair Housing Programs ==
In addition to its enforcement of fair housing laws, the Office of Fair Housing and Equal Opportunity oversees a number of fair housing-related programs.

Fair Housing Assistance Program (FHAP): The Fair Housing Assistance Program provides funding annually on a noncompetitive basis to State and local agencies that enforce fair housing laws that are substantially equivalent to the Fair Housing Act.

Fair Housing Initiatives Program (FHIP): The Fair Housing Initiatives Program provides funding to fair housing organizations and other non-profits who assist people who believe they have been victims of housing discrimination. FHIP organizations conduct preliminary investigation of claims of discrimination and help people who have been discriminated against contact their local government agency.

== Section 3 ==
Section 3 is a provision of the Housing and Urban Development Act of 1968 the helps foster local economic development, neighborhood economic improvement, and individual self-sufficiency. The Office of Fair Housing and Equal Opportunity at the U.S. Department of Housing and Urban Development administers the Section 3 program. The Section 3 program requires that recipients of certain HUD financial assistance, to the greatest extent feasible, provide job training, employment, and contracting opportunities for low- or very low- income residents in connection with projects and activities in their neighborhoods.

== Notable cases ==
In Las Vegas in 2002, a developer was made to pay $350,000 to retrofit a condominium complex to bring it into compliance with the Fair Housing Act and to compensate disabled persons who were harmed by the complex's lack of accessible features. Also in 2002, an eighteen-unit apartment complex in Caldwell, Idaho, was retrofitted to make it accessible to persons with disabilities and the payment of an additional $48,000 in damages and penalties.

== See also ==
- Title 24 of the Code of Federal Regulations
