= Fair Housing Assistance Program =

The Fair Housing Assistance Program (FHAP) is a federal program that is administered by the Office of Fair Housing and Equal Opportunity at the United States Department of Housing and Urban Development. The FHAP program provides funding annually on a noncompetitive basis to State and local agencies that enforce fair housing laws that are substantially equivalent to the Fair Housing Act.

Eligible grantees must be a state or local agency that enforces a fair housing law that is substantially equivalent to the Fair Housing Act. This means that the law provides substantive rights, procedures, remedies, and judicial review provisions that are similar to those under the Fair Housing Act. In determining eligibility, the Department of Housing and Urban Development may also take into consideration whether the jurisdiction is already served by an FHAP agency.

A number of activities are eligible for funding. FHAP-funded activities may include fair housing administrative and enforcement activities, including complaint processing, training, implementation of data and information systems, and other special projects.
