= Logan v. Zimmerman Brush Co. =

1982 U.S. Supreme Court case

- Supreme Court of the United States

Argued October 14, 1981 Decided February 24, 1982
- Full case name: Logan v. Zimmerman Brush Co.
- Docket no.: 80-5950
- Citations: 455 U.S. 422 (more) 102 S.Ct. 1148, 71 L.Ed.2d 265, 1982 U.S.LEXIS 75
- Argument: Oral argument

Case history
- Prior: Writ of prohibition granted, 82 Ill.2d 99, 411 N.E.2d 277 (Ill., 1980), sub nom Zimmerman Brush Co. v. Fair Employment Practices Commission

Holding
- State administrative dispute resolution agency dismissal of employee's discrimination claim because of its own failure to follow deadlines is denial of due process where employee had complied with procedural rules; claim of employment discrimination is a protected property interest under Due Process Clause. Illinois Supreme Court reversed.

Court membership
- Chief Justice Warren E. Burger Associate Justices William J. Brennan Jr. · Byron White; Thurgood Marshall · Harry Blackmun; Lewis F. Powell Jr. · William Rehnquist; John P. Stevens · Sandra Day O'Connor

Case opinions
- Majority: Blackmun, joined by Burger, Brennan, White, Marshall, Stevens
- Concurrence: Blackmun, joined by Brennan, Marshall, O'Connor
- Concurrence: Powell (in judgment), joined by Rehnquist

Laws applied
- U.S. Const. Amd. XIV

Logan v. Zimmerman Brush Co., 455 U.S. 422, is a unanimous 1982 decision of the U.S. Supreme Court concerning the Due Process Clause of the Fourteenth Amendment. The Court held that the petitioner was entitled to have his discrimination complaint adjudged by Illinois's Fair Employment Practices Commission (FEPC), which had dismissed it for its own failure to meet a deadline. The decision reversed the Illinois Supreme Court's holding to the contrary two years prior.

Logan, one of whose legs was shorter than the other, had been hired by Zimmerman in 1979 as a machine operator; when that proved beyond his capabilities, he was made a shipping clerk. A month later the company fired him for poor performance; within a week Logan brought a claim with FEPC, alleging he had been discriminated against due to his disability. FEPC was required to hold a factfinding conference with both parties within four months; it accidentally scheduled the one in Logan's case a week after that period ended. The company moved to dismiss the claim on those grounds; after FEPC's denial it petitioned the state Supreme Court for a writ of prohibition which was granted on the grounds that the statutory time limit was mandatory.

The U.S. Supreme Court granted Logan certiorari to argue on appeal that his constitutional rights to equal protection and due process of law had been violated. Justice Harry Blackmun, writing for the Court, followed some of its other recent cases in holding that when the state created a process for Logan to seek redress, it had also created a property interest in any claims filed through that process which could not itself be deprived without due process. Unusually, Blackmun also wrote a separate concurrence to the majority opinion, joined by three other justices, arguing that the Illinois Supreme Court had also violated Logan's right to equal protection of the laws by arbitrarily creating two classes of complainants but only granting full rights to one purely on the basis of its own deadline. Justice Lewis Powell also concurred, but would have decided the case on narrower grounds specific to Logan's circumstances, rejecting Blackmun's "broad pronouncements".

The Court has not revisited Logan in any later case, but it has often been cited as establishing a test for when due process has been denied. Lower courts have sometimes had to choose between Logan and the Parratt v. Taylor decision two years earlier (later overruled in part) as guiding precedent based on the record before them. Legal scholars have, in considering how it held Logan's claim a property interest, found it to straddle the line between procedural and substantive due process. It has also been described as the first time a majority of justices agreed that a challenged regulation failed the rational basis test under the Fourteenth Amendment. In the wake of the decision Illinois reformed the statute and replaced the FEPC with the Illinois Human Rights Commission, part of the newly created Illinois Department of Human Rights.

== Background ==
In 1961 the Illinois legislature passed the state's Fair Employment Practices Act (FEPA). It created the Fair Employment Practices Commission (FEPC), an administrative body empowered to hear and resolve complaints of employment discrimination in all categories protected by law. Early in its existence it incurred the wrath of large businesses; in 1964 Motorola offered to pay the legal bills of any small businesses in the state facing proceedings before the FEPC after it spent $200,000 fighting a decision to award $1,000 to an unsuccessful applicant. In 1975 the legislature added disability to the law's protected classes, but made FEPC the exclusive venue for resolving those complaints.

The FEPA set a deadline of 180 days from the alleged offense for complaints to be brought, and required only that FEPC notify any employer of a complaint against them within 120 days. After the state's Supreme Court held in its 1978 case Springfield-Sangamon County Regional Plan Commission v. Fair Employment Practices Commission that the deadlines were mandatory, not merely directory, the statute was amended to require that FEPC convene a fact-finding conference with the parties within the 120-day deadline, to promote speedier resolution of complaints and encourage negotiated settlements. In 1979, in a suit against FEPC brought by Chicago State University and another employer after the commission had waited two years to inform the latter of a pending complaint against it, the state Supreme Court not only reaffirmed its earlier ruling but clarified that if FEPC failed to notify the employer within 180 days of receiving the complaint, it lost jurisdiction permanently.

== Underlying dispute ==
In early October 1979 Laverne L. Logan was hired by the Zimmerman Brush Co., a Chicago manufacturer. (Note: The U.S. Supreme Court opinion describes his title as shipping clerk; the Illinois Supreme Court says he worked on the assembly line.) According to the company's lawyer, at that time it was fully aware that Logan's left leg was several inches shorter than his right. Zimmerman tried to accommodate him by assigning him first to the shipping room, and then to work on a machine where he could sit.

After a month, while he was still in his probationary period and thus not yet covered by the union contract, the company let Logan go since he was unable to perform his duties satisfactorily. Five days later, on November 14, Logan, on his own, filed a complaint with Illinois's Fair Employment Practices Commission (FEPC), alleging that he had been fired because of his physical disability in violation of state law.

In late January 1980 FEPC mailed to both Logan and Zimmerman notice that it had scheduled that conference for March 18. The company was also asked to complete and return a two-page questionnaire about its personnel practices and the circumstances of Logan's termination by March 10, which it did. At the conference, Zimmerman moved to dismiss Logan's complaint on the grounds that, since FEPC had mistakenly scheduled the conference for five days after the 120-day deadline had expired, it was no longer valid. FEPC denied the motion, so the company petitioned the Supreme Court of Illinois for a writ of prohibition barring FEPC from taking any further action; it granted a stay pending resolution of the case. Logan retained counsel and, since the six-month period for him to file a complaint had not yet lapsed, refiled.

In response, the legislature again amended FEPA to allow for the conference to take place after the 120-day deadline if both parties agreed. It took effect in July of that year.

== Supreme Court of Illinois ==
The court unanimously held for Zimmerman in a late September decision. It conceded that the use of "shall" in the statute did not, by itself, make its provisions mandatory. (Note: The one exception at the time, in Illinois, was for situations where holding the statute's deadline to be directory would not be deleterious to the rights of any party involved.) "One must consider the word within the context of the entire statute, looking particularly to the purpose of the legislation", wrote Justice Daniel P. Ward for his colleagues. Since that language had in earlier cases been held to mandate an action, it was presumed that the legislature knew this and intended that construction.

The commission attempted to distinguish Springfield-Sangamon by noting that its delay in bringing that case had been found to have had the potential to cost the employer considerable sums of money in back pay and fines, which would not have been the case here. The court responded that FEPC was reading that decision too narrowly and ignored the purpose of the conference, as clarified by the 1978 amendment, to provide an opportunity for speedy resolution of the complaint (perhaps through a negotiated settlement), save all parties time and money, and protect employers from frivolous complaints. "Without a required fact-finding conference the Commission would in most instances have to proceed solely on the basis of the employee's charge", Ward wrote. "Unless the Commission would be able to obtain information regarding the charge from some independent investigation its decision of whether or not to file a complaint would hardly be an informed one."

The court also found unpersuasive arguments by the commission and Logan that, by submitting the completed questionnaire and attending the conference, Zimmerman had waived any standing to move to have the charge dismissed on grounds of failure to proceed in a timely fashion. By doing so, Ward noted, it had merely been complying with the commission's request and thus the law; to not do so would have made it equally responsible for the delay of the conference. The record also did not reflect any awareness on the company's part that it was aware at that time that the conference had been scheduled too late.

Logan raised three additional arguments; the court rejected all of them. His equal protection and due process rights could not have been violated since the legislature had created reasonable procedures for the resolution of employment discrimination complaints, which had been followed. The amendment to FEPA that would have allowed the parties to waive the deadline was not explicitly worded to be retroactive. And since FEPC had otherwise processed his first complaint in compliance with the law, he could not be allowed to file a second one. Under the circumstances, "[n]ot only would an employer's rights be prejudiced if an employee were allowed to file a second and successive charge, but also the public interest in promoting an expeditious resolution of charges would be circumvented", Ward wrote.

== U.S. Supreme Court ==
Logan petitioned the U.S. Supreme Court for certiorari on the question of whether his due process and equal protection rights were violated by the state following its own procedures. Early in 1981 the petition was granted. Illinois Attorney General Tyrone C. Fahner filed a brief on FEPC's behalf. The Congress of Organizations of the Physically Handicapped filed an amicus curiae brief urging reversal.

=== Oral argument ===
Oral argument was held in October 1981. Gary Palm, arguing for Logan, went first. The Court was primarily focused on getting him to clarify the nature of Logan's injury and both constitutional claims. Asked whether a post-deprivation remedy would suffice, as the Court had held earlier that year in Parratt v. Taylor, where a state tort remedy was held constitutionally preferable to an inmate's federal Section 1983 lawsuit (Note: Parratt had also held that a Section 1983 suit was permitted for negligence, but said Parratt had not stated enough evidence to support that claim. In 1986's Daniels v. Williams, the Court reversed that, holding that Section 1983 suits could only be filed where intentional action was alleged.) over some hobby materials he had ordered that were lost by prison officials before they could be delivered to him, Palm demurred. "This is a case involving ... adjudicatory procedures, which just should not be put into the same category as the negligent handling of a hobby kit or the negligent handling of an automobile." Palm noted that his client was not ultimately seeking redress from the state, but his employer. All he had wanted from the former was the opportunity to make his case that he had been illegally fired by the latter, an opportunity he had followed every rule of the state's to exercise.

Afterwards, Jay Canel argued for Zimmerman. Justice Thurgood Marshall questioned why the company had taken the case this far, since it might otherwise have long since settled with Logan. Canel agreed, telling Justice William Rehnquist that his client felt the same way at that point but had earlier followed the advice of previous counsel that had advised him to assert his rights under the law. Justice John Paul Stevens saw "a real equal protection concern" with the 120-day deadline, since it might both allow claimants with spurious claims to get the full process while those with legitimate ones would not. Questioning Canel closely about what sort of post-deprivation remedies might still be available to Logan should the Court rule in Zimmerman's favor, since only the commission could order him reinstated, he asked Canel if he was arguing that there could never be a due process violation in litigation between private parties. Specifically Stevens brought up Mullane v. Central Hanover Bank & Trust Co., where the statutory notice provisions related to the suit were held deficient enough to be a due process violation. Canel said that while he did not think that, he believed Logan could still get economic restitution from the state through either the Illinois Court of Claims or a Section 1983 suit.

=== Decision ===
The Court issued its opinion in late March 1982. Unanimously, it had agreed with Logan that his rights had been violated by the process. In what way, and to what extent, it offered three different opinions. Justice Harry Blackmun wrote for the Court that Logan's due process rights had been violated. In an unusual separate concurrence joined by three other justices, he argued that the statute failed the rational basis test and thus denied Logan equal protection of the laws. Justice Lewis Powell agreed with the latter point, but would have limited the holding to the facts specific to the case.

==== Opinion of the Court ====
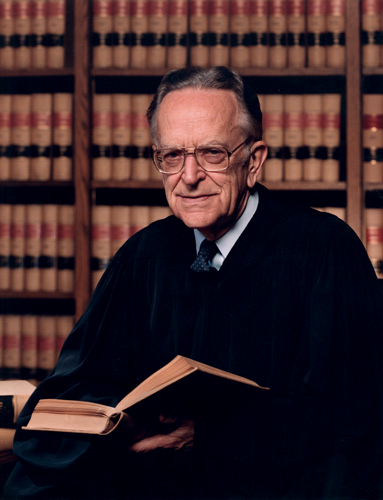
Justice Harry Blackmun, who wrote both the Court's opinion and a separate concurrence

"At the outset," Blackmun wrote after summarizing the facts of the case, "we are faced with what has become a familiar two-part inquiry: we must determine whether Logan was deprived of a protected interest, and, if so, what process was his due." Mullane, where a requirement that publication in a newspaper was held a constitutionally inadequate level of notice to the beneficiaries of a common trust fund who stood to be deprived of their rights to hold the trustees and fiduciaries accountable for mismanagement through the settlement process, was the precedent that "affirmatively settled" the first question. Zimmerman had attempted to distinguish the cases, but, Blackmun wrote, the Court was unconvinced.

And precedents even older than Mullane supported the protection of litigants' claims by the Due Process Clause of the Fifth Amendment. In 1971's Boddie v. Connecticut, filing fees for indigent defendants which prevented them from beginning divorce actions were held to violate the Fourteenth Amendment's Due Process Clause. "The hallmark of property, the Court has emphasized, is an individual entitlement grounded in state law, which cannot be removed except 'for cause,'" Blackmun explained. "Once that characteristic is found, the types of interests protected as 'property' are varied and, as often as not, intangible, relating 'to the whole domain of social and economic fact.'" (Note: Quoted language is from Justice Felix Frankfurter's dissent in National Mutual Insurance Co. v. Tidewater Transfer Co.)

"A claimant has more than an abstract desire or interest in redressing his grievance: his right to redress is guaranteed by the State, with the adequacy of his claim assessed under what is, in essence, a 'for cause' standard, based upon the substantiality of the evidence", Blackmun continued. Among the many things the Court had found to be protected property interests under the Due Process Clause were a horse trainer's license, he noted, referring to Barry v. Barchi, a 1979 case where the Court had held that New York had unconstitutionally suspended one after the horse had tested positive for banned substances after a race without guaranteeing the trainer a prompt adversarial hearing to offer a defense. It would take a "remarkable reading" of the Court's precedent, Blackmun wrote, "to conclude that a horse trainer's license is a protected property interest under the Fourteenth Amendment, while a state-created right to redress discrimination is not."

The Illinois Supreme Court's deference to the legislature, in holding that Logan only had such a right once the process of adjudicating the claim had actually begun, as it would have after the conference, misunderstood the nature of the Constitution's due process guarantee, said Blackmun. In a case decided around the same time as the Illinois Supreme Court's decision in the instant case, Vitek v. Jones, the Court had held in favor of a Nebraska prison inmate challenging his involuntary transfer to a mental hospital. Justice Byron White had held there that constitutional due process guarantees are federal and "not diminished by the fact that the State may have specified its own procedures that it may deem adequate for determining the preconditions to adverse official action". "Indeed", Blackmun added, "any other conclusion would allow the State to destroy at will virtually any state-created property interest."

Having established that Logan had been deprived of a property interest, Blackmun turned to the question of what process he was due before that happened. "[I]t has become a truism," he observed, "that 'some form of hearing' is required before the owner is finally deprived of a protected property interest." But Court precedent also recognized that the nature of the process would vary based on "the importance of the private interest and the length or finality of the deprivation ... the likelihood of governmental error ... and the magnitude of the governmental interests involved." Taking all these factors into consideration, Logan was entitled to the full process he would have gotten if the hearing date had been timely set:

Logan's interests in retaining his employment, in disproving his employer's charges of incompetence or inability, and—more intangibly—in redressing an instance of alleged discrimination, are all substantial. At the same time, the deprivation here is final; Logan, unlike a claimant whose charge is dismissed on the merits for lack of evidence, cannot obtain judicial review of the Commission action. A system or procedure that deprives persons of their claims in a random manner ... presents an unjustifiably high risk that meritorious claims will be terminated. And the State's interest in refusing Logan's procedural request is, on this record, insubstantial

Lastly, Blackmun addressed Zimmerman's arguments that the case not be distinguished from Parratt, that Logan still had post-deprivation remedies in state court. "This argument misses Parratt's point", Blackmun responded. That case had involved an unforeseeable accident, whereas Logan had been deprived of his property interest through the prescribed operation of state law. "Parratt was not designed to reach such a situation." He further pointed out that a tort against the state in its Court of Claims would be likelier to be more expensive and protracted for Logan than his FEPC case had been, and as Canel had conceded during oral argument, could not result in him getting his job back, something only the FEPC could order.

In conclusion, Blackmun reiterated that the Court's decision did not entitle every aggrieved litigant to their day in court or its equivalent. "The State may erect reasonable procedural requirements for triggering the right to an adjudication, be they statutes of limitations ... or, in an appropriate case, filing fees." But, quoting previous cases, he said that the Fourteenth Amendment required "'an opportunity . . . granted at a meaningful time and in a meaningful manner' ... 'for [a] hearing appropriate to the nature of the case'". That, Logan had been denied.

==== Blackmun concurrence ====
Blackmun took the unusual step of writing a concurring opinion to his own opinion for the Court. He was joined by three other justices: William Brennan, Marshall, and Sandra Day O'Connor (whom a headnote indicated joined only that concurrence and not Blackmun's majority opinion). "Although the Court considered that it was unnecessary to discuss and dispose of the equal protection claim when the due process issue was being decided in Logan's favor, I regard the equal protection issue as sufficiently important to require comment on my part," he wrote, "particularly inasmuch as a majority of the Members of the Court are favorably inclined toward the claim, although, to be sure, that majority is not the one that constitutes the Court for the controlling opinion." (Note: In a footnote, Blackmun quoted from Justice Robert Jackson's similar concurrence to his own opinion for the Court in Wheeling Steel Corp. v. Glander—"It cannot be suggested that in cases where the author [in writing by assignment] is the mere instrument of the Court he must forego expression of his own convictions"—in which he chastised dissenting justices William O. Douglas and Hugo Black for choosing the instant case to raise the issue of corporate personhood when they had made no complaint about it in earlier cases, including some where they had written for the Court in holding for corporate litigants based on those issues. Jackson had himself cited an example a section of Benjamin Cardozo's majority opinion in Helvering v. Davis 12 years earlier, where the justice had indicated that he and three others differed with the rest of the majority in believing that a question neither party had pleaded needed to be decided. Blackmun's footnote also cited Abbate v. United States, a later case where Brennan had added a personal concurrence to his majority opinion affirming dual sovereignty in criminal cases, in which he rejected the government's contention that serial prosecutions over the same act did not offend the Double Jeopardy Clause as long as they were under laws protecting different government interests, an issue the majority had declined to decide.)

The equal protection claim in the case was "unconventional", Blackmun conceded, since the state did not explicitly create any classifications among litigants in the FEPA. That changed with the Illinois Supreme Court's strict reading. According to Blackmun, by refusing to allow FEPC the flexibility to correct or ignore its own mistake, claimants for before it were now divided between those whose complaints the commission processed in a timely fashion and those who it failed to do so for, no matter how timely those complaints were otherwise.

Since there was thus a classification, the next step was to decide whether it was rational. After briefly reviewing precedent in the area that held that test was "not toothless" despite its requirements very often being met when considered by courts, Blackmun said that in this case there was no room for doubt: "I see no need to explore the outer bounds of this test, for I find that the Illinois statute runs afoul of the lowest level of permissible equal protection scrutiny."

Taking under consideration the FEPA's two stated purposes—eliminating employment discrimination while providing employers with a process that protected them from baseless claims—Blackmun wrote that "[i]t is evident at a glance that neither of these objectives is served by [FEPA]'s deadline provision. Terminating potentially meritorious claims in a random manner obviously cannot serve to redress instances of discrimination. And it cannot protect employers from unfounded charges, for the frivolousness of a claim is entirely unrelated to the length of time the Commission takes to process that claim."

Blackmun likened FEPA as interpreted by the Illinois Supreme Court to an Oregon statute the Court had struck down on equal protection grounds in Lindsey v. Normet a decade prior. The state had required that tenants challenging their evictions were required to put up a bond equal to twice their monthly rent in advance of beginning proceedings. The Court had rejected all challenges to that law save the equal protection grounds, for the merits of a tenant's case against their landlord had no relation to their ability to afford the potentially exorbitant bond. "While it may well be true that '[n]o bright line divides the merely foolish from the arbitrary law,'" Blackmun wrote, quoting from Schweiker v. Wilson, another equal-protection case the Court had decided the year before, "I have no doubt that [this law] is patently irrational in the light of its stated purposes."

The Illinois Supreme Court had also, Blackmun agreed, found two other public purposes for the 120-day deadline—that it expedited dispute resolution, and keeping the commission's case load manageable. He dismissed the first: "Insofar as the court meant to suggest that a factfinding conference may help settle controversies and frame issues for a more efficient future resolution, it was undoubtedly correct. But I cannot agree that terminating a claim that the State itself has misscheduled is a rational way of expediting the resolution of disputes." Blackmun also found this rationale dubious since once the conference had been held, the law set no deadline for the resolution of the dispute.

Blackmun conceded that claims where the deadline had been missed, such as Logan's, were indeed resolved expeditiously. But that was less analysis than the Fourteenth Amendment required, he wrote.

So far as the State's purpose is concerned, every FEPA claimant's charge, when filed with the Commission, stands on the same footing. Yet certain randomly selected claims, because processed too slowly by the State, are irrevocably terminated without review. In other words, the State converts similarly situated claims into dissimilarly situated ones, and then uses this distinction as the basis for its classification. This, I believe, is the very essence of arbitrary state action.

So, too, was the state's possible interest in administrative efficiency. If that was indeed the goal, Blackmun wrote, "[it] suffers from the defect outlined above: it draws an arbitrary line between otherwise identical claims." It was also "speculative and attenuated" in relation to that goal as to arbitrary on its face. "The State's rationale must be something more than the exercise of a strained imagination; while the connection between means and ends need not be precise, it, at the least, must have some objective basis", he concluded. "That is not so here."

==== Powell concurrence ====
Justice Powell, joined by William Rehnquist, characterized the case as being of "little importance except to the litigants" since the statute had long since been amended, arising from "an isolated example of bureaucratic oversight". He expressed surprise that the more likely solution, tolling the deadline until the hearing could be held, was rejected in favor of a strict reading of the statute.

"The issue presented, at least for me, is too simple and straightforward to justify broad pronouncements on the law of procedural due process or of equal protection", Powell wrote. Rejecting the expansive reading he believed was suggested by Blackmun's opinions, "should be decided narrowly on its unusual facts". (Note: In a footnote Powell allowed that he was not insensitive to the criticism of the Court's due process and equal protection jurisprudence as inconsistent and unclear, but averred that it was not going to be perfect with the great diversity of cases it took and nine justices writing opinions and offering input. He admitted his own opinions in the area had not always been as restrained as he would have liked the Court's to have been in this case, "[b]ut it does seem to me that this is a case that requires a minimum of exposition.) Those facts supported Blackmun's reasoning that the state denied Logan equal protection of the laws by creating two arbitrarily different classes of claimants:

As claimants possessed no power to convene hearings, it is unfair and irrational to punish them for the Commission's failure to do so. The State also has asserted goals of redressing valid claims of discrimination and of protecting employers from frivolous lawsuits. Yet the challenged classification, which bore no relationship to the merits of the underlying charges, is arbitrary and irrational when measured against either purpose. (Note: This meant a six-justice majority agreed on this, the first time a majority had held that a challenged statute failed the rational basis test, even though that was not the holding of the Court. Lower courts have generally looked to Logan purely as a due-process case. Blackmun's equal protection argument got some consideration in Rickett v. Jones, a 1990 Eleventh Circuit case, the petitioner prisoner alleged an equal-protection violation after his sentence was enhanced under Alabama's habitual-offender law while that of his codefendant in a failed escape attempt, which also should have been, was not due to prosecutors' failure to check the record. The panel found that the state's error was no more than mere negligence, which does not rise to the level of a constitutional violation, and largely followed Oyler v. Boles. In his concurrence, Judge Frank Minis Johnson wrote that Rickett's equal-protection claim was cognizable under the same logic that Blackmun's Logan concurrence had found: the arbitrary application of the law had created two classes of prisoners. Had there been evidence of the state's error being due to any factor greater than negligence, Johnson would have dissented; he advised Alabama's prosecutors to develop a more consistent system to perform criminal record checks lest future courts begin seeing more cases like Rickett's and considering the possibility that it had risen to the level of a constitutional violation.)

Powell agreed that Lindsey and Schweiker compelled the result. " Although I do not join Justice Blackmun's separate opinion, I agree that the challenged statute, as construed and applied in this case, failed to comport with this minimal standard", he concluded. "I am concerned by the broad sweep of the Court's opinion, but I do join its judgment."

== Aftermath ==
While the case was pending before the U.S. Supreme Court, the Illinois Supreme Court ruled on another challenge to the FEPA's deadlines provision. The 1978 amendment to the law following the Springfield-Sangamon decision had allowed claimants who had filed with the FEPC prior to that amendment's effective date but not had their claims acted on to refile those claims in state court. An employer facing a revived lawsuit argued the amended statute allowing it was a violation of the state constitution's guarantees of equal protection and due process, as well as its prohibition of laws benefiting a special interest without a rational justification. Again, in Wilson v. All-Steel, Inc., a unanimous opinion by Justice Ward, the Illinois Supreme Court agreed that by reviving extinguished claims for a class of plaintiffs distinguished purely by an arbitrary date of filing, it violated the equal protection rights of the other plaintiffs and the due process rights of the employers.

Wilson was interpreted as effectively barring the revival of any claim FEPC had administratively closed prior to 1981—until Logan. A federal class action suit brought by 3,000 plaintiffs who met its conditions went back and forth between the district court and the Seventh Circuit Court of Appeals for the rest of the decade until Judge Brian Barnett Duff held in 1989 that the retroactive application of Logan the plaintiffs sought, while otherwise justifiable, would have led to an inequitable result for employers who, possibly lacking access to the evidence necessary to defend claims that were at that point well over a decade old, would effectively be forced to settle to their own financial detriment. The plaintiffs appealed that as well, arguing that Chevron Oil Co. v. Huson allowed an exception, but the Seventh Circuit again held for the state.

== Subsequent jurisprudence ==
Two years later, in Hudson v. Palmer, another prisoner argued a guard's deliberate destruction of his property during a search of his cell constituted a due process violation per Logan. The Court declined to make the distinction. "In Logan, we decided a question about which our decision in Parratt left little doubt, that is, whether a postdeprivation state remedy satisfies due process where the property deprivation is effected pursuant to an established state procedure", wrote Chief Justice Warren Burger. "We held that it does not. Logan plainly has no relevance here."

The following year, in the landmark Cleveland Board of Education v. Loudermill decision on the due process rights of public employees facing termination from their jobs, Justice Byron White's majority opinion characterized Logan as "reiterat[ing]" its earlier holding in Vitek v. Jones, that while states are free to create, modify or even abolish whatever procedures they wish for the remedy of constitutional wrongs, those procedures still must comply with federal law. The Court has not had the occasion to revisit Logan since then; but many lower courts have.

=== Federal courts ===
==== Holman v. Hilton ====
Holman v. Hilton
- Court: United States Court of Appeals for the Third Circuit
- Full case name: Charles C. Holman Jr. v. Gary J. Hilton, Superintendent, New Jersey State Prison, Trenton, Robert Hatrak, Superintendent, New Jersey State Prison, Rahway, Donald Tucker, Assistant to the Superintendent, New Jersey State Prison, Trenton, Joseph Call, Chairman of Institutional Classification Committee, Captain A. Richardson, Captain at New Jersey State Prison, Trenton, Captain R. Curran, Captain at New Jersey State Prison, Rahway, and Lieutenant Williams, Lt., at New Jersey State Prison, Trenton
- Decided: July 6, 1983
- Citation: 712 F.2d 854

Case history
- Prior actions: 542 F. Supp. 913 (D.N.J., 1982), summary judgement for plaintiff
- Appealed from: District of New Jersey

Court membership
- Judges sitting: James Hunter III, Leon Higginbotham and Walter King Stapleton

Case opinions
- State law that barred suits by inmates against state or its agencies or officials in state court while they were incarcerated violates their rights to equal protection and due process. District of New Jersey affirmed.
- Decision by: Hunter

Keywords
- equal protection; due process; Section 1983; prisoners; property

Blackmun had rebuked Zimmerman for "miss[ing] the point" of Parratt with its attempts to distinguish the two cases, noting that what distinction there was—between the negligence of a government and its prescribed acts following its own procedures—actually weighed in Logan's favor. Two years later, in Holman v. Hilton, the Third Circuit discussed the relationship between the two cases at greater length in resolving a claim with elements of both.

Like Parratt, the case had been brought by a prison inmate, Charles Holman, serving a life sentence at what was then known as Rahway State Prison in New Jersey. While he had been at Trenton State Prison in 1976, some of his personal items had been impounded following a search after an abortive escape attempt. They included 65 record albums, a quartz Timex watch and a set of diamond engagement rings. After collecting mail room receipts to prove the items had been shipped to him, he filed a replevin action in Mercer County Court to recover either the items or their cash value, which he put at over $600. The complaint was dismissed per New Jersey law which forbade prisoners from suing the government or its employees until they had completed their sentences and been released.,

After his transfer to Rahway, he filed several more claims within the prison system for items (books, clothing and food) he had been told were destroyed in a fire at Trenton. In March 1979 those claims were denied on the grounds that despite knowing of the impending transfer he had refused to assist in packing his personal items. Five months later Holman filed a pro se federal lawsuit under Section 1983, alleging that the law barring his suit violated the Fourteenth Amendment by denying him due process after a deprivation of property. The District of New Jersey agreed, granting Holman summary judgement,

Judge Dickinson R. Debevoise held for Holman. The state had defended the statute as rational since it believed it limited the potential for conflict between prisoners and correctional officers; also it insisted that it reduced the likelihood of prisoners filing frivolous lawsuits in order to get taken to court appearances. "At the very least, the rationality of [this law] is open to serious question", Debevoise wrote. It seemed more sensible to him that having recourse to the courts would make the feared conflicts less likely. For two reasons he also doubted that the bar on lawsuits against the state and its employees by those still incarcerated would serve to deter frivolous lawsuits: Parratt would divert inmate suits to federal court, and the law did not distinguish between frivolous and meritorious suits.

It was not enough that the law fail the rational-basis test; it also had to serve to deny Holman his rights. Debevoise looked to Parratt and Logan for guidance. The former case was enough, he felt, but it was "confusing, however, and raises a number of difficult questions" that were answered by Logan. That case allowed him to see the challenged law as procedural and thus analogous to the FEPC's 120-day deadline in Logan. Since Holman's interests in the resolution of his dispute outweighed the state's, and he ran the risk of either dying in prison before he could bring suit or having to collect aged or unavailable evidence after release some time in the distant future, "[h]ere, as in the Logan case, the state has created an 'established procedure' which 'destroys [plaintiff's] entitlement without according him proper procedural safeguards.'"

The state appealed to the Third Circuit. Judge James Hunter III wrote for a unanimous panel that Parratt and Logan governed the case. After briefly reviewing the facts, similar to the former, he noted the difference: New Jersey, unlike Nebraska, barred prisoners from suing under state tort law for the duration of their sentence.

As such, this case is one step removed from Parratt, and our disposition must instead be guided by the principles articulated by the Court in Logan ... Reading Parratt and Logan together, it is plain that while Parratt may relegate a prisoner to his state tort remedies when such remedies are available, Logan provides the framework for analyzing the constitutional adequacy of state procedural limitations on those remedies. Therefore the principles of Logan are applicable in cases where it is claimed that the State refuses to make available to a claimant the established state procedures otherwise available for redress of deprivations of property.

Hunter first asked if the state law was constitutional by itself, without consideration of the presence of alternative procedures the state cited in defending the statute. He agreed with Debevoise that, following Logan, the law deprived Holman of his property interest, one "quite substantial ... as its arbitrary denial could leave him with an uncompensated loss of what little personal property is allowed him in prison." He was equally doubtful of the state's logic behind the law, and also found Holman's interests greater than the state's.

New Jersey also argued that its administrative processes were an adequate substitute for litigation, but Hunter found them constitutionally deficient since they did not guarantee a hearing, and the state had the sole discretion to act on them. He specified that it was not necessary to have a hearing in every prison administrative process, just "some kind of meaningful opportunity to have [a] claim properly evaluated at some point." It "need not be formal nor need it be conducted pursuant to the requirements of the Federal Rules of Evidence or the Federal Rules of Civil Procedure."

==== Diggs v. United States ====
The following year, the Third Circuit held against a prisoner whose pro se petition to have his sentence reduced under Federal Rule of Criminal Procedure 35(b) was sent by him before the 120-day deadline it set expired but not acted upon by the court for another year and a half. The government challenged the ensuing reduction to time served for lack of notice. The sentence reduction was vacated, and Diggs then filed a habeas petition challenging the vacatur order. After the district court dismissed it, he appealed.

Logan had been decided during the pendency of the case, which Judge Edward R. Becker admitted had a "provoking" effect on the case. But it was not sufficient for him to hold for Diggs. He was doubtful that a single rule could give rise to the property interest that Logan had found derived from an entire procedure, and that even if it could be said to there was less risk of erroneous deprivation than under the FEPA's 120-day limit because federal judges have almost unlimited discretion in considering sentence reductions.

Becker further distinguished Logan from the instant case by noting that while the extinction of Logan's claim by the lapsed deadline in his FEPC claim frustrated the state's interest in fighting employment discrimination, Diggs could still address the issues that might make early release better for him and the government through parole applications. Lastly the federal government's bases for limiting the time 35(b) petitions could be filed was a finding that the Parole Commission was generally better suited to considering when prisoners could be released, which Becker found rational.

Dissenting Judge John Joseph Gibbons argued that the delay in processing Diggs' original petition was not "unreasonable" since it was entirely the district court's fault. As a result, it was unnecessary for the court to reach the due process claim that had been based on Logan, and he would have remanded the case to the district court to reconsider with the stipulation that no events subsequent to the original sentence reduction be considered in evaluating the petition.

==== Yates v. Jamison ====
In 1986 the Fourth Circuit split over whether Logan or Parratt controlled a case brought by a Fayetteville, North Carolina, couple who sought compensation from the city of Charlotte after it demolished a house they owned there without notifying them beforehand. The city's building inspector's office had, the Yateses said, failed to exercise proper diligence in trying to locate them after it found the vacant house uninhabitable. After the district court denied the city's motion to dismiss, the city filed an interlocutory appeal.

Writing for the majority, Judge Robert F. Chapman held for himself and district judge Terrence Boyle, sitting by designation, that the sole question on appeal was whether Parratt reached the Yates' complaint. They had argued it came under Logan as having happened as a result of the city's "policy or custom" of inadequate searches of public records when trying to locate absentee property owners. Chapman noted that they themselves had attributed the demolition to "willful or reckless negligence" on the city's part. Finding the state's inverse condemnation procedures adequate enough remedy, he and Boyle reversed the district court and ordered the Yates' claim dismissed.

Judge Samuel James Ervin III dissented. He agreed that it was necessary to consider the applicability of Parratt and Hudson to the case to decide it, however after a lengthy review of those cases and other relevant precedent he found Logan more to the point since the other two cases concerned unauthorized takings of property. "[I]t is clear that, if the allegations in the complaint are true," Ervin wrote, "notice and the opportunity for a hearing were required prior to the destruction of the Yates' house."

Ervin analogized the inverse condemnation process to the tort claim the Illinois Supreme Court had held an acceptable remedy for Logan—it would have been time-consuming, expensive and in the end could not have undone the original injury. "A predeprivation hearing after appropriate notice is the only possible way in which the owner of a building alleged to be unfit for human habitation can adequately protect his interest. Under the ordinance he may elect to contest the unfit characterization of the structure, or he can, by making repairs, save his property from destruction", Ervin wrote. "Hence, a postdeprivation hearing cannot possibly meet the owner's needs."

==== Other federal cases ====
- Haygood v. Younger: In 1985, the Ninth Circuit affirmed a Section 1983 jury verdict in favor of a former prisoner who alleged California had miscalculated his sentence, resulting in him serving five years more than he should have, could proceed with a Section 1983 action against the state for excessive custody. In such a case, wrote Judge Alfred Goodwin for an en banc court, "[a] court's first task is to determine whether Parratt (random act) or Logan (official practice and procedure) controls." The court agreed that Haygood's extra time was the result of the latter.
- Bretz v. Kelman: The same year, the Ninth Circuit found Logan applicable when remanding a Section 1983 malicious prosecution suit by a Montana man back to the district court which had dismissed it. "As in Logan, Bretz is challenging the direct abuse of the state process itself. It is meaningless to speak of the state's ability to provide postdeprivation remedial process where the state process itself has been abused", (Note: Gerald L. Neuman, then at Penn, wrote in 1988 that the distinction the Ninth Circuit (and other courts) tried to draw here was not supported by the language of Logan, which expressly concerned a case in which the deprivation was alleged to have come about due to state officials following the law, rather than acting unlawfully within the scope of procedure.) Goodwin wrote. "Consequently, also as in Logan, the state cannot satisfy the due process clause here by providing Bretz with a postdeprivation remedy in state court in the form of a tort action for malicious prosecution."
- Burch v. Appalachee Community Mental Health Services: Judge Thomas Alonzo Clark relied on Logan when concurring in this 1988 Eleventh Circuit decision that held a Florida man had been deprived of his rights when, after being involuntarily committed to a local mental hospital, he was held there for five months without a legally required hearing before being discharged. Despite the greater factual similarities to Hudson and Parratt, Clark found Logan the controlling case, as the plaintiff had been taken into custody under established state procedure, and his lengthy commitment had been the result of the state's failure to follow that procedure, just as Logan's complaint had been closed due to the state's mistake.
- Matthias v. Bingley: In 1990, the Fifth Circuit upheld a jury verdict for several plaintiffs whose seized property was ultimately sold due to a series of paperwork mistakes by members of the Houston Police Department. The defendants had likened the case to Parratt, as an unforeseeable and random action for which no predeprivation remedy could be possible. Judge Irving Loeb Goldberg was not convinced, seeing the case as more like Logan: "In fact, this case involves a systemic problem far more constitutionally problematic than that in Logan. In Logan, had the system worked correctly and no error occurred, the Commission's actions would not violate the Due Process Clause", he wrote. "But here, even if every City employee strictly complies with the City's system for processing seized property ... the system itself still blatantly violates the Due Process Clause."
- Long v. Morris: In this 1991 case, the Sixth Circuit relied on Logan to deny qualified immunity to Tennessee correctional officers who suspended, or threatened to, inmates' visitation privileges in retaliation for their refusal to comply with a strip search. Since state prison regulations said those privileges could only be abridged for good cause, they were a protected interest and came under the protection of Logan as settled law.
- Shvartsman v. Apfel: In 1998, the Seventh Circuit rejected this challenge to the Personal Responsibility and Work Opportunity Act of 1996 by permanent resident aliens whose food stamps were terminated in August 1997, per the act, unless they could prove they had gained U.S. citizenship by that point. They had likened their case to Logan, but Judge Joel Flaum was unpersuaded, distinguishing the cases by noting that Logan had recognized a property right in the claim itself, not the procedures to assert it: "[Their reliance on Logan gets them no closer to their goal of establishing a property interest in the Food Stamp recertification procedures. This result is unsurprising, for defining access to procedures as a protectable property interest would eliminate the distinction between property and the procedures that are constitutionally required to protect it", he wrote. The Supreme Court has repeatedly emphasized the importance of this distinction, and the Court has not looked favorably upon claims of a property entitlement to a set of procedures." (Note: Almost a decade later, the Eastern District of Pennsylvania ruled similarly in a case where refugees and asylum applicants sought an extension of the seven years of Supplemental Security Income they were allowed under statute on the grounds that despite their good-faith compliance with the procedures, the agencies responsible for processing their citizenship and permanent-residence applications were taking too long, thus depriving them of a benefit in which they could claim a property interest, as in Logan. Judge Eduardo Robreno found that to misunderstand the case the same way the Shvartsman plaintiffs had: "Logan would help Plaintiffs if they could show that they were entitled to SSI benefits and that the seven-year limit was just a procedural limitation to terminate the SSI benefits of the undiligent, not a substantive element of their eligibility", he wrote. "[Here] the time limitation is part of the substantive definition of Plaintiffs' entitlement to SSI benefits. In Logan, the 120-day limitation was a means to an end, not a definition of the plaintiffs entitlement itself. That is not the case here.")
- Youakim v. McDonald: In 2000 the Northern District of Illinois sided with foster parents who challenged a reform in the system that denied them retroactive benefits past a certain date if the state's Department of Children and Family Services (DCFS) had not yet acted upon their applications, even if they were later found by DCFS to have been in continual compliance with new licensure requirements up to a certain date. Judge John Albert Nordberg found this provision "analogous to the 120-day deadline in Logan. Neither Plaintiffs here nor the plaintiff in Logan had any ability to expedite the process, their property interest was entirely in the hands of the State and the State is proceeding arbitrarily." And unlike Logan, there was no postdeprivation remedy available.
- Hettinga v. United States, in 2012, considered a different aspect of Logan: the degree of deference involved in rational basis review. The D.C. Circuit affirmed a district court decision upholding the provision of the Milk Regulation Equity Act of 2005 (MREA) that eliminated a classification exempting large producer-handlers of milk from federal milk marketing orders, adversely affecting the interests of the plaintiff Arizona dairy processor. Among other issues, Hettinga claimed that the district court had been too deferential in applying the rational basis review to the MREA, noting that Logan had said the process is "not toothless". "Regardless of how Justice Blackmun characterized rational basis review, the Supreme Court's subsequent decision in Beach (Note: "Whether embodied in the Fourteenth Amendment or inferred from the Fifth, equal protection is not a license for courts to judge the wisdom, fairness, or logic of legislative choices. In areas of social and economic policy, a statutory classification that neither proceeds along suspect lines nor infringes fundamental constitutional rights must be upheld against equal protection challenge if there is any reasonably conceivable state of facts that could provide a rational basis for the classification.") makes clear that 'not toothless' does not mean 'growling,'" the court's per curiam opinion responded. In the instant case, regardless of the impact on the plaintiffs, the government had satisfactorily explained the basis for the law, which was found to be rationally related to that purpose.

=== State courts ===
==== Board of County Commissioners of Calvert County v. Pritchard ====
Board of County Commissioners of Calvert County v. Pritchard
- Court: Maryland Court of Appeals
- Full case name: Board of County Commissioners of Calvert County v. Denzil Pritchard et ux
- Decided: May 9, 1988
- Citation: 312 Md. 522, 540 A.2d 1139

Case history
- Prior actions: dismissed at trial in favor of petitioners, reversed on appeal
- Appealed from: Maryland Court of Special Appeals

Court membership
- Judges sitting: John C. Eldridge, Harry A. Cole, Lawrence A. Rodowsky, John F. McAuliffe, William Adkins II, Albert T. Blackwell Jr., Charles E. Orth Jr.

Case opinions
- Denial of site plan approval as incompatible with new zoning was constitutional even where plan was filed on eve of grace period deadline since respondents had previous two years to act and could have been granted extensions of time limits had they done so, thus state action was not arbitrary and out of respondents' control. Court of Special Appeals reversed
- Decision by: Rodowsky

Keywords
- Due process; Deadlines; zoning

In 1988 the Maryland Court of Appeals, that state's highest court, reversed the state's Court of Special Appeals, holding Logan inapplicabe, in a case where landowners challenged a rezoning of their property. The respondents in Board of County Commissioners of Calvert County v. Pritchard owned a 21.6-acre (8.7 ha) lot at an intersection on Maryland Route 4 north of Dunkirk that had been zoned "rural commercial" until May 1984 when the county adopted a new rezoning plan that reclassified it as "rural". The new zoning gave owners who wished to develop their property per the previous zoning a two-year window to do so, provided they had an approved site plan; after that they had an additional two years to get their construction completed.

The year after the rezoning, the Pritchards provisionally sold the lot to a developer who drew up plans for a shopping center at the site, and submitted them to the county planning commission, which gave the project preliminary approval but sought some changes. Near the end of the year that approval was rescinded after an updated plan was not submitted. In May 1986, the day before the original two-year grace period expired, the Pritchards submitted a nearly identical site plan, which the commission again rejected. This time it cited the zoning change.

The Pritchards sued, but lost at trial in circuit court. The Court of Special Appeals reversed in an unpublished opinion, finding that the two-year grace period established a property interest for the Pritchards which, per Logan, the state could not terminate without due process. The county was granted certiorari by the state Court of Appeals.

"There is no procedural due process violation", wrote Judge Lawrence Rodowsky for a unanimous court. The Pritchards had not been denied a hearing; they had had one when they submitted their plan right before the deadline and had been given adequate notice two years prior of what they needed to have done in order to retain the rural commercial zoning. Contrary to what the lower court had held, mere submission of a plan did not toll the deadline. "Logan is not on point", Rodowsky said. "Here ... the Pritchards' property was not downzoned as a result of any determination of adjudicative facts by the Commission. The downzoning was legislative action ... delayed for the two-year grace period."

The Pritchards had also argued a denial of equal protection, based on Blackmun's concurrence in Logan. Again the court was unconvinced.

Unlike Logan, whether a property owner satisfies the criterion by the time limit is a matter over which the property owner can exercise control, where, as here, there is no question as to the good faith of the administrative review ... Those who submit their site plans for review early in the two-year grace period enjoy a greater likelihood that the process will be completed and any approval granted than do those who delay until late in the process or who, as did the Pritchards, delay until the last moment.

==== Joshua v. City of Gainesville ====
The Florida Supreme Court heard a case with similarities to Logan in 2000. The petitioner in Joshua v. City of Gainesville had five years earlier made formal complaints seven months apart to the state's Commission on Human Relations alleging the city had denied her a promotion on racial grounds and then retaliated against her following that complaint. The statute governing the commission said that it had 180 days to make a determination of whether reasonable cause exists to believe there is merit to the complaint; after that complainants have a year to file suit if they wish to pursue that remedy. In Joshua's case the commission never made any determination during that time, so she filed suit in 1998.

The city moved for dismissal on the grounds that the case was time-barred, citing recent lower-court precedent to that effect. Joshua could have filed her suit no later than January 1997, it said. She responded that that deadline did not apply because she had never received any determination from the commission, and thus the state's usual four-year statute of limitations for statutory causes of action applied, under which her suit had been timely. The trial court ruled for the city and dismissed, which Joshua appealed. The First District Court of Appeal affirmed, but certified the question to the state Supreme Court.

Writing for a unanimous court, Justice Peggy Quince looked to the text of the statute to determine the legislature's intent. It was clear, she said, that the legislature expressed a preference for complainants to first seek administrative dispute resolution before going to court. To do so it established the one-year limitation for those who received a favorable reasonable-cause finding, and required the commission to dismiss any complaint where it found in the negative. But, "[w]hat is not clear, however, is what happens when the Commission fails to make any determination within the allotted 180 days." The city and Joshua argued that in pari materia readings of the statute supported their positions, with the latter relying on a precedent where an age-discrimination suit had been allowed to proceed under the four-year deadline.

Quince held that the rigid application of the deadline in Joshua's case, without any statutory support, denied her due process. She found Logan to be helpful in understanding this. "As in Logan, this case involves administrative inaction and error", Quince wrote. "A claimant should not be penalized for attempting to allow a government agency to do its job." To that end she reminded the commission that it owed every complainant notice within the 180 days.

==== District of Columbia v. Beretta USA ====
In 2008 the District of Columbia Court of Appeals relied in part on Logan when dismissing the district's suit against the gunmaker for its role in contributing to gun violence in the district by retroactively applying the federal Protection of Lawful Commerce in Arms Act (PLCAA), which strictly limits suits against firearms manufacturers, passed during the pendency of the suit. The district argued that the ongoing action was a claim with a property interest, like Logan's, that could not just be arbitrarily extinguished by an act of Congress. "But Logan, in our judgment, imposes no such complete restriction on legislative authority", wrote Judge Michael W. Farrell for a unanimous court.

Farrell pointed to the language in Logan saying that the state "remains free to create substantive defenses or immunities for use in adjudication—or to eliminate its statutorily created causes of action altogether". That last was exactly what had happened here, he wrote. The district had been deprived of its claim not by the executive or judicial branches, but by a legislative act, which was per Logan, all the process that was due."

The district had argued that this still said nothing about Congress's powers to retroactively bar causes of action that it had previously permitted while suits under those causes were pending. Farrell looked to other cases, particularly Plaut v. Spendthrift Farm, Inc., a 1995 case where the Supreme Court had held unconstitutional an amendment to the Securities Act of 1934 that required federal courts to reopen some closed cases. While the district's suit was a protected property interest per Logan, Farrell conceded, that alone could not exempt it from the FLCAA.

==== Shepherd of the Valley Lutheran Retirement Services v. Cesta ====
In 2019 Ohio's Eleventh District Court of Appeals heard the case of Shepherd of the Valley Lutheran Retirement Services, a nursing home operator which had sought to recover nearly $25,000 in unpaid pills from the family of a former Warren nursing home resident after her 2016 death. Its lawyer had thus applied to be appointed special administrator for her estate, one day before the six-month deadline to make a claim against the estate ended. The lawyer was appointed a week later, and the claim presented to him, but in mid-2017 Cesta's husband was appointed her executor per her will. He rejected the nursing home's claim as untimely, and the organization challenged that in Trumbull County Court of Common Pleas within the two months required by state law.

Shepherd argued that, like Logan, they had been deprived without recourse of a property claim because of a process—the untimely appointment of an administrator for the Cesta estate—over which they had no control. The trial court rejected that argument, holding that Shepherd had been aware of the deadline since Cesta's death, of which it was also aware, and had waited too long to seek the appointment of a special administrator. "Such application is not an unduly burdensome or time consuming pursuit", it said, granting summary judgement to Cesta.

On appeal, the decision was affirmed. Judge Diane Grendell wrote for a unanimous panel that Logan was inapposite both legally and factually. First, the statute establishing the deadline was self-executing, involving no process, and thus beyond the reach of Logan. Second, Shepherd, unlike Logan, had waited almost until the last moment to request the appointment of a special administrator. "There is no evidence that Shepherd of the Valley sought an expedited ruling or otherwise advised the probate court of the urgency of the appointment", Grendell wrote. "[I]t cannot be said that [it] acted with due diligence to comply with [the statute]'s reasonable procedural requirements. The claim in Logan, by contrast, was compromised by the state's inaction and dilatory conduct."

== Analysis and commentary ==
=== Theory of property ===
The year after Logan was decided, Emory law professor Timothy Terrell added a lengthy critique of Blackmun's reasoning behind holding Logan's complaint a protected property interest, which he characterized as "harmful[ly] superficial", to an essay he had begun writing on what he argued was the Court's vague and intellectually unsound understanding of property. By not elucidating more on Justice Jackson's equally shallow analysis in Mullane, "much important analytic detail is assumed and obscured." While a contractual cause of action had long been recognized as property under the common law concept of a chose in action, it was harder to recognize torts as property due to their lack of transferability.

Terrell focused on Blackmun's likening of Logan's right to have his complaint heard on the merits to the indigent petitioners' right to divorce in Boddie. "While his conclusion may seem reasonable, his reasoning is strained and unnecessary", Terrell wrote. Divorce did not have to be viewed as property to be a protectable interest. "Instead, it and any other right relating to use of the court system could and should be labeled as 'liberty' interests."

Terrell connected this to a theory he had been developing that due process rights are strongest where the government provides the only forum for redress. He defended Justice Rehnquist's widely criticized plurality opinion in Arnett v. Kennedy, which suggested rights like life, liberty and property were rights only in the sense that procedures had been put in place to protect citizens from arbitrarily being deprived of them, (Note: Douglas Laycock, then a law professor at Texas, observed that Logan's opinions show a rejection of Rehnquist's Arnett opinion by all but one of his fellow justices at the time.) as at least acknowledging the issue Blackmun's Logan opinion avoided. While the "for cause" standard he had invoked to hold Logan's claim a property interest worked within the opinion, "[it] does not give us any basis to disagree with the Illinois Supreme Court's conclusion that this entitlement had some serious 'holes' in it", Terrell commented. Blackmun further erred in treating Logan's property rights as purely procedural without reaching the substantive rights that underlay them. "The basic criticism that can be made of Justice Blackmun's reasoning throughout his opinion in [Logan] is not that it is illogical or productive of indefensible results," Terrell concluded, "but that it is incomplete. By failing to identify and rely upon the normative foundations of the Due Process Clause, his opinion lacks the kind of structured and rigorous legal analysis it could and should possess."

Three years later Villanova professor Karen Flax considered the issue at more length. She argued that while the Court did not formally reject the "bitter with the sweet" theory until Loudermill, it effectively did so in Logan. There, by joining Blackmun's majority opinion, Burger, who had been part of the plurality in Arnett, formally left Rehnquist by himself in asserting it.

Thomas W. Merrill, Charles Evans Hughes Professor at Columbia Law School, looked back in 2000 and observed that, perhaps because Loudermill had explicitly rejected Arnett's "bitter with the sweet" formulation, the "analytically coherent solution to the positivist trap" that Logan had offered in conjunction with another minimally cited case from that era, Memphis Light, Power & Gas Division v. Craft (Note: According to Merrill, Justice Powell's opinion in that case qualified Roth and Arnett by declaring that although property might be defined and created by operation of state law, the adequacy of procedures to protect it still had to be evaluated against federal standards.) had been overlooked. As a result, four of the Court's recent cases (Note: Phillips v. Washington Legal Foundation, 524 U.S. 156 (1998) (any interest earned on client money stored in IOLTA is property of the client), Eastern Enterprises v. Apfel, 524 U.S. 498 (1998) (funding scheme enacted for in Coal Industry Retirement Health Benefit Act of 1992 was unconstitutional taking of petitioner's property), College Savings Bank v. Florida Prepaid Postsecondary Education Expense Board, 527 U.S. 666 (1999) (Congress did not have power to make states subject to trademark claims under Lanham Act) and Drye v. United States, 528 U.S. 49 (1999) (taxpayer's disclaimer of inheritance under state law did not defeat liens on unpaid federal income taxes)) that had turned in part on the definition of property were still problematic.

Merrill found one of those four cases, College Savings Bank v. Florida Prepaid Postsecondary Education Expense Board, to be in particular conflict with Logan. There, the private-party petitioner had sued the respondent state agency over advertising that they claimed misrepresented their competing product, alleging among other claims trademark infringement. The bank had argued it had a property interest in its potential future business, an interest it claimed the state's actions had damaged. Justice Antonin Scalia's majority opinion rejected that argument, characterizing the bank's interest as "future business activity", which could not be considered property, unlike its intellectual-property claims, since it could not include the right to exclude.

Scalia described this as "the hallmark of property", which to Merrill brought to mind the same phrase used by Blackmun in Logan—but with a different predicate: "an individual entitlement grounded in state law, which cannot be removed except 'for cause'". In addition to this conflict, Merrill pointed that Logan, which the bank had mentioned only once in its briefs and Scalia had not cited at all, had reaffirmed Mullane (likewise unmentioned by Scalia) in explicitly recognizing a cause of action as property, under which the Court could have held for the bank. "The failure to attend to Logan and the procedural due process case law points to what will surely be the most vexing problem created by College Savings Bank", Merrill wrote.

=== Procedural and substantive due process ===
In a later paper, Michigan professor Christina Whitman similarly describes Logan as "stand[ing] on the border between procedure and substance." She groups it with Parratt as representing a direction she believes the Court abandoned too quickly due to the complexities it presented, "properly sensitive to the design of state systems in handling of citizen concerns, and to the possibility that structural designs may create constitutional questions through either omissions or inadvertence." (Note: Specifically, in Logan, she noted that the Illinois legislature may not have pondered what penalties, if any, the FEPC would incur if it failed to hold the conference within the 120-day period.) Logan, she explains, blurs the distinction between procedural and substantive due process in that it asks not "whether the decision to deprive Logan of his claim ... was made with fair procedures, but whether that decision could be reached at all."

In the wake of the 1989 DeShaney v. Winnebago County decision, in which the Court held that an abused child's due process rights were not violated by county social workers' failure to protect him despite their awareness of the abuse before he suffered permanent brain damage, Boston University (BU) professor, Jack Beermann, saw Logan as a counterexample to the Court's analysis in the case, since in both cases the petitioner had looked to the government to protect them from, or remedy, private harm. He argued that Logan had to be read as a substantive due process case since there was, unlike most procedural due process cases, no doubt that the claim existed to begin with. "I would read Logan more broadly and argue that when government promises any sort of benefit in a situation like DeShaney, it should be required to keep its promise," he wrote. "[T]he Court's decision can be supported on the ground that people are entitled to rely on the state's promise to fight discrimination, and the state cannot avoid that promise surreptitiously, with surprising procedural or substantive bars."

=== Blackmun's concurrence ===
Smolla also found Blackmun's concurrence, finding Logan had been denied his equal-protection rights as well through the arbitrary operation of the FEPA, "more elegantly simple" than his opinion for the Court. He found it a further qualification of Parratt: "... although the hallmark of property is an entitlement that cannot be removed except 'for cause,' the attempt by a state to permit certain administrative action to be taken with or without cause may sometimes be so devoid of rational justification that it violates equal protection, notwithstanding the existence of state tort remedies."

Flax, too, found Blackmun's concurrence the most "surprising" aspect of the decision, for the way it allowed circumvention of the entitlement doctrine, under which litigants have a claim against the state only if the law creating the right or privilege can be read as making it an entitlement, limiting judicial review of the state's action. "In effect", she wrote, "his argument maintains that, with or without a state-created entitlement, a state denies equal protection when it allows administrators to act in a totally arbitrary fashion." Flax pointed to City of Cleburne v. Cleburne Living Center, Inc., where the Court struck down an administrative act without reaching the ordinance authorizing it, as showing how "Logan "undermines the doctrine because it by itself is an entitlement case."

Stanford professor William Cohen wrote more about Powell's shorter concurrence. "Obviously, if a majority of the justices had followed [his] lead, Logan would not be among the cases meeting head-on the puzzle [of] whether the state must provide fair procedures for substantive entitlements it did not have to give in the first place", he wrote. But viewing it as a due process case would have made it difficult to justify the result. "Equal protection would provide a narrower precedent simply because it would obscure the reasons for that conclusion."

Another BU professor, Kenneth Simons, was more skeptical of Blackmun's equal-protection analysis. He suggested that, assuming the hypothesized goal of reducing the FEPC's caseload was the actual reason for the deadline, if perhaps it was understaffed and could not otherwise stay within its budget, "[t]his is an unfortunate state of affairs, but does it deny equal protection?" Flax also wondered whether a lottery would be seen as unconstitutional if that were the case.

Simons also considered Blackmun's analysis legally deficient. "I do not understand why Justice Blackmun feels compelled to accept the state court's characterization of this inadvertent result as a 'classification'", he wrote. Federal law should have been determinative of that question. Simons also believed that it might only have been a constitutional issue if the misscheduling had occurred more than once, and the agency could have been ordered to develop and adopt remedies. "If this were an isolated, random error of an individual employee, however, I doubt that the problem should be analyzed as an equal protection 'classification'".

=== Stringency of rational basis review ===
Other commentators have followed the D.C. Circuit's Heeringa example by taking note of not just what Blackmun's concurrence says about the stringency of rational basis review but putting it into practice. In 1984 DePaul professor Jeffrey Shaman cited Logan as one of three recent cases where the Court was less deferential to governments in considering the rationality of the statute under review than it had typically been. (Note: The other two were Department of Agriculture v. Moreno (provision of Food Stamp Act denying benefits to otherwise eligible recipients who cohabited with other recipients not members of their families was not justified by Congress's apparent desire to keep hippie communes from exploiting the program) and Zobel v. Williams(distribution formula for Alaska Permanent Fund dividends that favored longer-term residents had no rational basis and infringed right to travel)) "[I]n all three of these decisions the Court restricted the indulgence that normally prevails under minimal scrutiny for overinclusive and underinclusive legislation, and thereby sharpened the level of review", Shaman wrote. St. Mary's professor David Dittfurth sees Logan as demonstrating that "[a]lthough it is often said that the lowest tier of equal protection analysis applies to general economic or social welfare regulation, the more accurate view is that judicial scrutiny will be applied only when the Supreme Court finds reason to be especially suspicious of a particular type of classification."

=== Other issues ===
The year after the decision, Illinois law professor Rodney Smolla devoted an extended analysis to Logan and its relationship with Parratt, in the context of what he saw as the Court's increasing emphasis on state tort remedies over Section 1983 actions as appropriate responses to alleged due process violations. Taking note of Blackmun's rebuke of Zimmerman for suggesting there was no distinction between the two cases, he saw the Court as holding Parratt applied to cases where the plaintiff alleged random, unforeseeable government action, while Logan applied if the due process violation arose from the operation of law. (Note: Smolla likened that distinction (noted later by Judge Goodwin in Haygood) to the one the Court drew between Wisconsin v. Constantineau and Paul v. Davis. In both cases the original plaintiffs had alleged due process violations after local law enforcement publicized their names; Constantineau's pursuant to a state law that allowed the local police chief, with no notice required, to post a flyer with her name at local liquor stores stating that she was barred from purchasing alcoholic beverages for a year, while Davis's name and mugshot for a shoplifting arrest on a charge that was ultimately dropped were on a flyer of "active shoplifters" distributed to merchants. The Court had found that Constantineau's rights had been sufficiently violated as to strike down the law, but conversely held that Davis's privacy violation should be addressed in state court, on the grounds that not every tort alleged against a state official rose to the level of a Section 1983 tort, a holding that has been widely criticized.)

In another paper, Smolla called Logan's use of the rational basis test "a starting point for the development of a sound rational compromise" between the rights-privilege analysis of due process, which the court had abandoned in the 1960s with Keyishian v. Board of Regents, and the entitlement doctrine that had emerged as a possible replacement a few years later in Board of Regents of State Colleges v. Roth.

The authors of a 1984 Georgia Law Review article primarily critical of Parratt for doing little to clarify the distinction between common-law and constitutional torts also believed Logan could have done more to resolve that issue. "The precedential authority of the Logan Court's treatment of Parratt is open to question since the Court never should have reached Parratt's 'adequacy' issue at all," they wrote in a footnote. Since Logan, unlike Parratt's Taylor, was not suing the state, "the straightforward answer to the defendant's argument, then, is that the threshold requirement for the invocation of Parratt is a constitutional tort action that can be avoided by an adequate state tort remedy and that this threshold is not met on the facts of Logan."

David Azrin of Michigan counsels against deriving a rule that arbitrary state court action should be corrected by federal courts from Logan and two other cases (Note: Thompson v. City of Louisville, 362 U.S. 199 (1960) (loitering conviction reversed due to absence of proof of any element of the charge) and Hicks v. Oklahoma, 447 U.S. 343 (1980) (defendant sentenced under law later held invalid was entitled to resentencing)) He notes that the Court's majority opinion in the case moves, without explanation, from locating Logan's property right in his claim to the procedures that he had to follow, and that the Court does not explain why it rejected the Illinois Supreme Court's interpretation—the Court may, he speculates, have felt an anti-discrimination claim entitled to special consideration, and "by silently changing the nature of the property interest while remaining within the traditional due process analysis, the Court was able to protect Logan's right to be free from discrimination without announcing a new constitutional doctrine concerning discrimination."

Azrin also wrote about Logan's "feeble" attempt to distinguish itself from Parratt. "The practical difficulties in applying the distinction between acts 'operative of state law' and those that are merely 'unauthorized' are compounded by the emptiness of the concept itself", he explained, observing that federal courts trying to apply the case had reached different conclusions when considering similar state actions under the two cases. (Note: Accord Bonnie Moore, Parratt, Liberty, and the Devolution of Due Process: A Time for Reflection, 13 W. St. U. L. Rev. 201, 214 (1985).) "A number of courts have explicitly refused to interpret Logan broadly to support a rule against arbitrary state decisions", particularly in the First Circuit, Azrin observed. They cited both the intrusion on state lawmaking and judicial processes, and that "the added layer of federal review does not ensure a more correct result." He concluded that "Logan should not be read broadly to support a rule against arbitrary state decisions. [It] should instead be limited to its facts."

Richard Lempert and Joseph Sanders, authors of An Invitation to Law and Social Science, find the "otherwise ordinary" case of Logan an excellent illustration of the difference between the older forms of action, which focused on strict adherence to procedure, preferred in English common law courts and the modern substantial causes of action, under which a plaintiff must only state the facts of the case, which displaced them in the mid-19th century. The Illinois Supreme Court took a more form-based approach when it issued the writ of prohibition since the FEPC had not complied with the statutory requirement to hold the conference within the 120-day period. "This argument would have done a common lawyer proud," they write. "It elevates form over substance in much the same way demurrers do to technically deficient pleas." The Supreme Court's reversal came from taking a more substantive approach to the case.

A 1990 comment in the University of Pennsylvania Law Review on the issue of using fees to control access to the courts and thus reduce caseloads expressed the belief that, in the wake of Logan, indigent or financially challenged plaintiffs seeking to have any fees reduced or waived will have to rely exclusively on due process arguments. Prior to it, Boddie and two other cases, all of which rested on other issues, had controlled. (Note: Those cases were United States v. Kras (due process rights not violated by requirement that bankrupts pay filing fees) and Ortwein v. Schwab (due process not violated by filing fee required of welfare recipients challenging adverse determinations)) "But the restriction of the access argument to due process in Logan, coupled with the Court's refusal to enunciate a doctrine tying any of the aforementioned strands into a coherent whole, will surely keep the civil litigant's status in limbo for the foreseeable future."

== See also ==
- List of United States administrative law cases
- List of United States Supreme Court cases by the Burger Court
