= Gamble v. United States =

- Supreme Court of the United States

Argued December 6, 2018 Decided June 17, 2019
- Full case name: Terance Martez Gamble, Petitioner v. United States
- Docket no.: 17-646
- Citations: 587 U.S. 678 (more) 139 S. Ct. 1960; 204 L. Ed. 2d 322
- Argument: Oral argument

Case history
- Prior: United States v. Gamble, 694 F. App'x 750 (11th Cir. 2017); cert. granted, 138 S. Ct. 2707 (2018).

Questions presented
- Whether the Court should overrule the "separate sovereigns" exception to the Double Jeopardy Clause.

Holding
- The court declined to overturn the separate sovereigns doctrine, concluding that historical precedent has held that it is a part of the Fifth Amendment.

Court membership
- Chief Justice John Roberts Associate Justices Clarence Thomas · Ruth Bader Ginsburg; Stephen Breyer · Samuel Alito; Sonia Sotomayor · Elena Kagan; Neil Gorsuch · Brett Kavanaugh

Case opinions
- Majority: Alito, joined by Roberts, Thomas, Breyer, Sotomayor, Kagan, Kavanaugh
- Concurrence: Thomas
- Dissent: Ginsburg
- Dissent: Gorsuch

Laws applied
- U.S. Const. amend. V

Gamble v. United States, No. 17-646, 587 U.S. 678 (2019), was a United States Supreme Court case about the separate sovereignty exception to the Double Jeopardy Clause of the Fifth Amendment to the United States Constitution, which allows both federal and state prosecution of the same crime as the governments are "separate sovereigns". Terance Martez Gamble was prosecuted under both state and then federal laws for possessing a gun while being a felon. His argument that doing so was double jeopardy was found unpersuasive due to the separate sovereignty exception. In June 2019, the Supreme Court affirmed the lower court decision 7–2, with the majority opinion stating that there was not sufficient cause for overturning the dual sovereignty doctrine. It was a rare case where Associate Justices Ruth Bader Ginsburg and Neil Gorsuch were the only dissenters, although they filed separate dissents.

== Legal background ==
The separate sovereigns doctrine holds that because the federal and state government are "separate sovereigns", the Double Jeopardy Clause does not apply to prosecution of the same crime under both federal and state laws. The doctrine is more than 150 years old. States can (and some do) have "economy of prosecution" policies, which make it a policy to not concurrently expend resources to prosecute offenses against their state laws where an alleged perpetrator is arrested and being tried for equal or greater offenses, similar or identical to alleged offenses against the laws of the prosecution's state. In those states, the district or states' attorneys will only move to prosecute an alleged perpetrator should (1) the initial prosecution fail to convict, or (2) the case is abandoned before a verdict. In all such instances, the separate sovereigns doctrine retains the authority to prosecute at the discretion of the state, sister state, or federal government. In the 1959 cases of Abbate v. United States and Bartkus v. Illinois, the Supreme Court affirmed the doctrine. The doctrine has been criticized by many scholars as having no basis in the text of the clause.

== Case background ==
In November 2015, Terance Martez Gamble was pulled over in Mobile, Alabama for a damaged headlight. After a search of the vehicle, a handgun was found which was illegal under both Alabama state and federal laws because he was a felon. He was convicted under Alabama state law and given a one-year sentence. He was also prosecuted under federal laws, and after the district court concluded that double jeopardy did not apply in this case, he pled guilty and received a 46-month sentence. Gamble appealed to the 11th Circuit Court of Appeals, who affirmed the district court's decision based on the precedent of Abbate.

== Supreme Court ==
In June 2018 the Supreme Court agreed to hear the case. Gamble's petition to the Supreme Court noted that in 2016, Supreme Court Associate Justices Ruth Bader Ginsburg and Clarence Thomas had argued for a review of the separate sovereigns doctrine in a concurring opinion in Puerto Rico v. Sanchez Valle; Ginsburg's opinion, joined by Thomas, stated that "[t]he matter warrants attention in a future case in which a defendant faces successive prosecutions by parts of the whole USA."

=== Amicus briefs ===
According to The Atlantic, the U.S. federal government contended that "overturning the dual-sovereignty doctrine would upend the country’s federalist system", and that the increasing number of federal criminal laws means that it is important that states be allowed to "preserve their own sphere of influence and prevent federal encroachment on law enforcement".

The American Civil Liberties Union, the Cato Institute, and the Constitutional Accountability Center filed a joint amicus brief on the case, arguing that there is no textual basis for the doctrine in the Double Jeopardy Clause, which states that "[n]o person shall be ... subject for the same offense to be twice put in jeopardy of life or limb", and that the rising amount of federal criminal laws and state-federal task forces means there will be more dual state-federal prosecution.

The case has been analyzed in the context of the Special Counsel investigation into the Trump campaign; if the separate sovereigns doctrine had been overruled, a pardon for federal crimes from President Donald Trump would have prevented state prosecution. United States Senator Orrin Hatch filed an amicus brief in the case, arguing against the separate sovereigns doctrine. A spokesperson for him denied any relation of the brief to the investigation, saying that Hatch wants the doctrine to be overturned due to "the rapid expansion of both the scope and substance of modern federal criminal law".

Columbia Law professor Daniel Richman wrote that state and federal charges usually have "no overlap, or almost no overlap, that would ring Fifth Amendment chimes in the absence of the dual sovereign analysis", and so the impact of overturning the separate sovereigns doctrine would be minimal.

=== Oral arguments ===
Oral arguments were originally scheduled to be heard on December 5, 2018, but were postponed due to a day of mourning for George H. W. Bush, who died on November 30, 2018. Oral arguments were heard on December 6.

Observers found the court to be concerned about overruling 170 years of the doctrine and the instability that would result with this change, but did affirm that there is concern from academics and judiciaries on the doctrine's effects.

=== Decision ===
The Supreme Court issued its decision on June 17, 2019, affirming the lower court's decision. Justice Samuel Alito wrote the 7–2 majority opinion in which the majority held that there was not sufficient cause for overturning the dual sovereignty doctrine. Alito highlighted that it is written into law that a person may be tried for the same offense in both national and international courts, so the exception for double jeopardy between state and federal trials already exists. Justice Clarence Thomas, who joined Alito's opinion, wrote a concurring opinion to state that the historical record of the double jeopardy clause does not justify overturning the dual sovereignty principle in this case, but urged the court to be more willing to overturn precedents when they are "demonstrably erroneous".

Justices Ruth Bader Ginsburg and Neil Gorsuch wrote separate dissenting opinions. Quoting directly from an actual usage of all caps in The Federalist Papers, Ginsburg wrote: "Different parts of the 'WHOLE' United States should not be positioned to prosecute a defendant a second time for the same offense." Gorsuch wrote: "When governments may unleash all their might in multiple prosecutions against an individual, exhausting themselves only when those who hold the reins of power are content with the result, it is the poor and the weak, and the unpopular and controversial, who suffer first—and there is nothing to stop them from being the last."
