= Hudson v. Palmer =

Hudson v. Palmer Palmer v. Hudson
- Supreme Court of the United States

Argued December 7, 1983 Decided July 3, 1984
- Full case name: Ted S. Hudson, Petitioner v. Russell Thomas Palmer, Jr.; Russell Thomas Palmer, Jr., Petitioner v. Ted S. Hudson
- Docket no.: 82-1630; 82-6695
- Citations: 468 U.S. 517 (more) 104 S. Ct. 3194; 82 L. Ed. 2d 393
- Argument: Oral argument

Case history
- Prior: Palmer v. Hudson, 697 F.2d 1220 (4th Cir. 1983); cert. granted, 463 U.S. 1206 (1983).

Holding
- Prison inmates have no reasonable expectation of privacy in their cells under the Fourth and Fourteenth Amendments, and destruction of property did not constitute a Due Process violation under the Fourteenth Amendment because Virginia had adequate state law remedies.

Court membership
- Chief Justice Warren E. Burger Associate Justices William J. Brennan Jr. · Byron White; Thurgood Marshall · Harry Blackmun; Lewis F. Powell Jr. · William Rehnquist; John P. Stevens · Sandra Day O'Connor

Case opinions
- Majority: Burger, joined by White, Powell, Rehnquist, and O'Connor
- Concurrence: O'Connor
- Concur/dissent: Stevens, joined by Brennan, Marshall, and Blackmun

Laws applied
- U.S. Const. amend. IV; U.S. Const. amend XIV

Hudson v. Palmer, 468 U.S. 517 (1984), is a United States Supreme Court case in which the Court held that prison inmates have no privacy rights in their cells protected by the Fourth Amendment to the United States Constitution. The Court also held that an intentional deprivation of property by a state employee "does not violate the Fourteenth Amendment if an adequate postdeprivation state remedy exists," extending Parratt v. Taylor to intentional torts.

== Background ==
On September 16, 1981, Ted Hudson and a fellow officer at the Bland Correctional Center in Bland, Virginia, entered the cell of Russell Palmer, an inmate at the center, to conduct a "shakedown" search. After the search, Palmer brought a civil rights suit against Hudson under 42 U.S.C. § 1983, claiming that Hudson had destroyed some of his personal property — "including legal materials and letters" — in violation of his Fourteenth Amendment due process rights, and that the search was undertaken "solely to harass him" in violation of his Fourth Amendment right to privacy.

The District Court held for Hudson on summary judgment, ruling under Parratt v. Taylor that "intentional destruction of a prisoner's property is not a violation of due process, when the prisoner has an adequate remedy under state law," and that a non-routine search of a prison cell intended to harass the prisoner would not have "constitutional significance" under the Fourth and Fourteenth Amendments. The Fourth Circuit affirmed the District Court's due process holding but reversed its Fourth Amendment decision, concluding that Palmer "had a limited privacy right which may have been violated" if the search was undertaken because of "a desire to harass or humiliate him."

== Decision ==
Writing for a five-justice majority, Chief Justice Burger held that summary judgment was appropriate against Palmer on both his due process and Fourth Amendment claims. In so doing, Burger affirmed the Fourth Circuit's decision that Virginia's postdeprivation remedies eliminated the due process concerns arising from the destruction of Palmer's property, but reversed its holding that Palmer had a "limited privacy right" in his cell under the Fourth Amendment.

As to Palmer's Fourth Amendment claim, the Court applied the reasonable expectation of privacy test established by the landmark Katz v. United States decision in 1967, asking "whether a prisoner’s expectation of privacy in his prison cell is the kind of expectation that 'society is prepared to recognize as reasonable.'" Under that test, the Court held that prisoners have no right to privacy in their cells for two reasons: because the need for prison security requires "[u]nfettered access to these cells by prison officials...if drugs and contraband are to be ferreted out and sanitary surroundings are to be maintained," and because "society would insist that the prisoner’s expectation of privacy always yield to what must be considered the paramount interest in institutional security." Based on Bell v. Wolfish, where the Court had previously upheld a federal policy of conducting body-cavity searches of pretrial detainees after every visit with someone outside the facility, Burger reasoned that restricting prisoners' Fourth Amendment protections is not problematic because "it is clear that imprisonment carries with it the circumscription or loss of many significant rights."

The Court also held against Palmer on his due process claim under the Fourteenth Amendment. Palmer argued that Hudson had intentionally destroyed his property, and that this violated his due process rights. But the Court held that a "postdeprivation process must be constitutionally adequate" to address due process claims like Palmer's, ruling "that an unauthorized intentional deprivation of property by a state employee does not constitute a violation of the procedural requirements of the Due Process Clause of the Fourteenth Amendment if a meaningful postdeprivation remedy for the loss is available." This expanded the holding of Parratt v. Taylor, in which the Court held that state tort remedies available after the fact were sufficient due process when a prison official negligently lost an inmate's hobby kit. Applying the rule of Parratt to intentional destruction of property, Chief Justice Burger held that there had been no due process violation because Virginia had an adequate process in place for addressing Palmer's claim.

== Concurring opinion of Justice O'Connor ==
Justice O'Connor joined the majority opinion and also wrote a brief separate concurrence. O'Connor argued that the Court was correct to hold the Fourth Amendment inapplicable in prison cells because "prison searches are the categorically reasonable products of necessarily ad hoc judgments of prison officials maintaining prison safety." She also responded directly to Justice Stevens' assertion in dissent that Fourth Amendment seizure protections were implicated by the case, arguing that Palmer had no seizure claim because "the exigencies of prison life authorize officials indefinitely to dispossess inmates of their possessions without specific reason." She argued further that the destruction of Palmer's property only raised due process claims, not Fourth Amendment issues, because it "had no bearing on whether the search and seizure were reasonable." O'Connor explained that Palmer's claim failed because he had neither taken advantage of the postdeprivation remedies for his due process concern offered by Virginia nor shown that those remedies were inadequate.

== Concurring/dissenting opinion of Justice Stevens ==
Justice Stevens filed an opinion on behalf of four justices concurring in the Court's due process ruling but "bitterly dissent[ing]" from its Fourth Amendment holding. "[T]he dissenters found a clear fourth amendment violation in Hudson's malicious confiscation and destruction of Palmer's property." Stevens argued that Hudson's actions violated both the search and seizure protections of the Fourth Amendment because "inmates must retain some 'slight residuum of privacy'" in their cells and because the Seizure Clause "protects prisoners' possessory interests even assuming the absence of any legitimate expectation of privacy."

Although Stevens agreed that the need for prison security makes it legitimate for correctional officers to randomly search inmates' cells, he argued that safety concerns do not eliminate all civil rights of prisoners and that Palmer's Fourth Amendment rights had been violated in this case because the personal materials destroyed by Hudson had been found not to be dangerous. Stevens added that allowing concerns about prison security to extinguish inmates' Fourth Amendment rights "is to declare that the prisoners are entitled to no measure of human dignity or individuality," and that the Court's decision "declares prisoners to be little more than chattels."

Finally, the dissenters disagreed with Chief Justice Burger's assessment that society would not recognize privacy rights for prisoners as legitimate. Stevens argued that this belief about what level of privacy society would find reasonable was contradicted by the fact that lower courts were generally in agreement that prisoners retain some privacy rights, and that prison officials also shared a "near-universal view...that guards should neither seize nor destroy noncontraband property." The dissenters "pointed out with some irony [that] the Court's view of 'reasonableness' is 'not based on any empirical data; rather it merely reflects the perception of the four Justices who have joined the opinion that The Chief Justice has authored.'"

== Impact ==
Hudson v. Palmer reversed a trend among the lower courts of finding that "all prison searches are not per se reasonable and that persons incarcerated in jails and prisons are entitled to some measure of Fourth Amendment protection." The case has been applied to find that cell searches in general do not violate inmates' Fourth Amendment rights, including searches "conducted for the purpose of extortion rather than prison security." Most state courts interpreting their state constitutions have followed Hudson and found that inmates have no constitutional privacy protections in their prison cells; Vermont is the only exception.

Although Hudson v. Palmer held that prisoners have no Fourth Amendment rights in their cells, it did not address whether prisoners have privacy rights in their persons. "Hudson merely concluded that the Fourth Amendment affords no protection for the prisoner's privacy interest in his cell or his possessory interest in his effects kept there, and thus arguably has no application to searches and seizures of the person of a prisoner." Hudson also did not specify whether its holding applied to pretrial detention facilities or was limited to prisons; lower courts have disagreed on that question. In 2012, the Supreme Court cited Hudson v. Palmer in Florence v. Board of Chosen Freeholders of County of Burlington, where it held that strip searches of pretrial detainees entering a general jail population do not violate the Fourth Amendment. However, the Court in Florence found that the search was constitutional by "striking a balance between inmate privacy and the security needs of correctional institutions," not by holding that pretrial detainees have no Fourth Amendment privacy rights.

== See also ==
- Bell v. Wolfish, 441 U.S. 520 (1979) — holding several prison practices constitutional, including visual body-cavity searches of pretrial detainees.
- Parratt v. Taylor, 451 U.S. 527 (1981) — postdeprivation remedies provided by a state were sufficient to satisfy due process when prison officials negligently lost an inmate's property.
- Daniels v. Williams, 474 U.S. 327 (1986) — negligence by a state official does not create a due process violation, overruling Parratt v. Taylor.
- Samson v. California, 547 U.S. 843 (2006) — suspicionless searches of parolees did not violate the Fourth Amendment.
- Florence v. Board of Chosen Freeholders of County of Burlington, 566 U.S. 318 (2012) — suspicionless strip searches of pretrial detainees entering a jail's general population are constitutional under the Fourth and Fourteenth Amendments.
