= Chose =

Rights in property in common law

Chose (pronounced: /ʃoʊz/, French for "thing") is a term used in common law tradition to refer to rights in property, specifically a combined bundle of rights. A chose is the enforcement right which a party possesses in an object. The use of chose extends from the English use of French within the courts. In English and commonwealth law, all personal things fall into one of two categories, either choses in action or choses in possession. English law uses chose to refer to a bundle of rights, traditionally relating to property which may be utilised in certain circumstances. Thus, a chose in action refers to a bundle of personal rights which can only be enforced or claimed by a chose-holder bringing an action through the court to enforce the action. In English law, this category is enormously wide. This is contrasted with a chose in possession which is a bundle of rights which can be enforced or acquired by taking physical possession of the object. This may be, for example, a legal mortgage. Both choses in possession and choses in action represent separate proprietary interests. What differs between each is the method in which each chose may be enforced. This is dependent on the possessory nature of the reference object.

Historical uses include a chose local, a thing annexed to a place, such as a mill; and a chose transitory, something movable that can be carried from place to place.

== Chose in action ==
A chose in action or thing in action, also known as a chose in suspense, is a right to sue. It has been made trite law, since Torkington v Magee, that chose in action is a legal expression used to describe all personal rights of property that can be claimed or enforced only by legal action. It is a categorisation of interests in assets, therefore, the enforcement of which cannot be secured without the use of a court. It is an intangible property right recognised and protected by the law, which has no existence apart from the recognition given by the law, and that confers no present possession of a tangible object. Since incorporeal assets such as claims for repayment of debts, or assigned rights in contracts cannot be subject to possession, they cannot be categorised as choses in possession. In certain circumstances, the chose in action creates a separate proprietary right, independent from the property in which it may reference. This new property can be subject to charges or can be assigned. For example, a right to enforce and receive payment for a debt, obtain money by way of damages for breach of contract, or receive recompense for a wrong is a chose in action. Two consequences result from this. Firstly, they are claims which cannot be executed by the chose-holder without the enforcement of legal proceedings. Second, these examples may be themselves assigned, novated, or otherwise used by the chose-holder if the economic value of the asset is the right to sue. Historically, documents which represented a title to a chose in action of a particular kind, such as bonds or other documentary intangibles, were themselves choses in possession because, similar to promissory notes, they were negotiable and thus could be physically seised. That is to say, they were transferred solely by delivery of the document itself. Today, most bonds and other financial instruments have been dematerialised and are issued as a single global note. The consequence of this is that most financial instruments are now choses in action held by the beneficial party against the broker holding assets in a securities depository such as CREST, where investors own interlocking interests in trusts, rather than the actual issued note. The development of dematerialised securities brings some objects which are termed as chose in action today full circle, such as bonds or bill of lading which the court first developed as choses in action, and which, without the use of a negotiable instrument no longer operate as choses in possession. Currently, claims which are treated as being "locked up" inside the paper include pledges, negotiable instruments, and custodial bailment.

Choses in action are particularly crucial to the assignment of interests in law, and thus play a crucial role in the operation and coordination of the financial markets. Certain rights, such as a claim to rescission of a mortgage, are rights of action, but not choses in action or part of one that can be assigned. Because the category is often broadly construed, there have been numerous attempts to expand the category to allow new intangible assets to fall within the chose in action.

In the United States, the Supreme Court has held in Mullane v. Central Hanover Bank & Trust Co. that a property right can vest in a cause of action over property, and later, in Logan v. Zimmerman Brush Co., in a discrimination claim.

=== Effect of fusing of chancery and common law ===
The chose can either be legal or equitable. Before the Judicature Acts, which fused the courts of equity and common law into one jurisdiction, where the chose could be recovered only by an action at law as a debt (whether arising from contract or tort), it was termed a legal chose in action; where the chose was recoverable only by a suit in equity, as a legacy or money held upon a trust, it was termed an equitable chose in action. Before the Judicature Acts, a legal chose in action was not assignable, i.e., the assignee could not sue at law in his own name. To this rule there were two exceptions:

1. the Crown (i.e. central government) had always been able to assign choses in action that are certain, such as an ascertained debt, but not those that are uncertain; and
2. assignments valid by operation of law, e.g., on marriage, death, or bankruptcy; on the other hand, however, by the law merchant, which is part of the law of England, and which disregards the rules of common law, bills of exchange were freely assignable.

Before this point, the courts of equity could not enforce a legal chose in action and vice versa. The consequence was that, with these and certain statutory exceptions (e.g., actions on policies of insurance), an action on an assigned chose in action must have been brought at law in the name of the assignor, though the sum recovered belonged in equity to the assignee. All choses in action being in equity assignable, except those altogether incapable of being assigned, in equity the assignee might have sued in his own name, making the assignor a party as co-plaintiff or as defendant. The Judicature Acts made the distinction between legal and equitable choses in action of no importance. The Supreme Court of Judicature Act 1873, s. 25 (6), enacted that the legal right to a debt or other legal chose in action could be passed by absolute assignment in writing under the hand of the assignor. This was later updated by the Law of Property Act 1925 s. 136 which outlined that for an assignment to be valid:

- it must be in writing;
- it must be absolute, and not by charge only; and
- written notice must be given to the obligor.

These requirements are significant because without notice, it prevents the assignee from suing on the debt. Until the debtor has given notice, set-offs continue to arise between the assignor and the debtor, the debtor does not know to pay anyone other than the assignor; and the assignee may lose priority to subsequent assignees who do provide notice. The difference between present and future choses in action has been likened to the difference between a tree and its fruit.

== Chose in possession ==
A chose in possession refers to a bundle of rights and remedies (which in England are inextricably linked) of an object of tangible personal property that can be physically possessed by the owner and can be transferred by delivery. Relation, or rather, capacity of control and apparent dominion is required as the foundation of the alleged chose in possession. This is impossible with incorporeal rights. Possession and possession-based techniques are of little relevance to modern financial markets, but still play a substantial role in commercial and retail lending. Therefore a chose in possession denotes not only the right to enjoy or possess a thing, but also the actual or constructive enjoyment of it. The possession may be absolute or qualified. It is absolute when the person is fully and completely the proprietor or owner of the thing; it is qualified when he "has not an exclusive right, or not a permanent right, but a right that may sometimes subsist and at other times not subsist", as in the case of animals ferae naturae ("of a feral nature", or wild). A chose in possession is freely transferable by delivery. Previous to the Married Women's Property Act 1882, a wife's choses in possession became vested in her husband immediately upon her marriage, while her choses in action did not belong to her husband until he had converted them to possession. However, this difference is now practically obsolete.

In practice, there is little difference between the utility of a chose in possession and a chose in action, outside of insolvency. However, a Chose in possession is particularly important in view of insolvency as the possessory right of the asset allows for enforcement of security irrespective of the solvency of the company. Where an asset is (1) unique and cannot be replicated, such as shares in a company amounting to board control; (2) a proprietary interest wherein account of profits of the original owed item; or (3) procedural remedies; exist, a chose in possession will be crucial in enforcement.
