= Bibb v. Navajo Freight Lines, Inc. =

- Supreme Court of the United States

Argued March 30–31, 1959 Decided May 25, 1959
- Full case name: Bibb, Director, Department of Public Safety of Illinois v. Navajo Freight Lines, Inc., et al.
- Citations: 359 U.S. 520 (more) 79 S. Ct. 962; 3 L. Ed. 2d 1003; 1959 U.S. LEXIS 1777

Case history
- Prior: Appeal from the United States District Court for the Southern District of Illinois

Holding
- The Illinois law requiring trucks to have mudguards was unconstitutional under the Commerce Clause.

Court membership
- Chief Justice Earl Warren Associate Justices Hugo Black · Felix Frankfurter; William O. Douglas · Tom C. Clark; John M. Harlan II · William J. Brennan Jr. Charles E. Whittaker · Potter Stewart

Case opinions
- Majority: Douglas, joined by Warren, Black, Frankfurter, Clark, Brennan, Whittaker
- Concurrence: Harlan, joined by Stewart

Laws applied
- Commerce Clause Article 1, Section 8, Paragraph 3: Interstate Commerce Clause

Bibb v. Navajo Freight Lines, Inc., 359 U.S. 520 (1959), is a United States Supreme Court case in which the Court held that the Illinois law requiring trucks to have unique mudguards was unconstitutional under the Commerce Clause.

== Background ==
The state of Illinois enacted a statute requiring curved mud guards, instead of straight mudflaps on trucks driven in Illinois. Although there was no federal regulation requiring mudflaps or mudguards, Arkansas required straight mudflaps, which were legal in at least 45 states. The Illinois legislature asserted that the unique curved mudguards would be more useful in preventing stones and other debris to be kicked up from the back of trucks, thus preventing more accidents than other types of mudflaps. The plaintiffs were trucking companies who drove through Illinois and would have to use one form of mudflap equipment while in Illinois, but other mudflap equipment while in other states. The named plaintiff was Navajo Freight Lines, Inc., of New Mexico.

The only issue was whether in the absence of federal regulation, in this context did the Commerce Clause allow one State to prescribe standards that would affect interstate carriers in a way that would conflict with the standards of another State.

== Opinion of the Court ==
The Supreme Court held that the Illinois law was unconstitutional under the Commerce Clause, technically the Dormant Commerce Clause.

In Bibb v. Navajo Freight Lines, 359 U.S. 520, 524 (1959), the Supreme Court stated:

These safety measures carry a strong presumption of validity when challenged in court. If there are alternative ways of solving a problem, we do not sit to determine which of them is best suited to achieve a valid state objective. Policy decisions are for the state legislature, absent federal entry into the field. Unless we can conclude on the whole record that "the total effect of the law as a safety measure in reducing accidents and casualties is so slight or problematical as not to outweigh the national interest in keeping interstate commerce free from interferences which seriously impede it we must uphold the statute."

— Bibb v. Navajo Freight Lines, Inc.

The court was unanimous, but Justice Harlan filed a concurrence, which was joined by Justice Stewart. To find the statute unconstitutional, the Court balanced the benefit of the regulation to the state (in the form of increased safety) against the burden on interstate commerce arising from out of state truck drivers having to stop at the Illinois border and change mudguards. Because the benefit to Illinois was small and the burden on interstate commerce large, the Court held that

This is one of those cases—few in number—where local safety measures that are nondiscriminatory place an unconstitutional burden on interstate commerce.

— Bibb v. Navajo Freight Lines, Inc.

== Subsequent developments ==
It is considered one of the leading precedents on the law of Interstate commerce.

== See also ==
- Kassel v. Consolidated Freightways Corp.: 1981 U.S. Supreme Court case applying the Dormant Commerce Clause to interstate trucking safety regulations
- List of United States Supreme Court cases, volume 359
