= Uniform Law to Secure the Attendance of Witnesses from Within or Without a State in Criminal Proceedings =

Uniform law in the United States

The Uniform Law to Secure the Attendance of Witnesses from Within or Without a State in Criminal Proceedings, also known as the Uniform Act to Secure the Attendance of Witnesses from Without a State in Criminal Proceedings, is a uniform law within the United States. It provides a process by which an attorney in a criminal matter in one U.S. state may seek to secure the attendance of a witness (or seek documents from a witness) from another state; the process requires the approval of courts in both the state in which the criminal matter is being heard, as well as a court in the state in which the witness is found. In the absence of the process being followed, the subpoena power of any state court in the United States generally ends at that state’s border.

The uniform law was drafted in 1931, and revised in 1936. In 1959, the U.S. Supreme Court sustained the Act in an opinion in New York v. O'Neill written by Justice Felix Frankfurter. By 2012, it had been adopted by all states in the United States.

== History ==
The subpoena power of any state court in the United States generally ends at that state’s border. Consequently, lacking any powers outside the state's border, state prosecutors and defense attorneys in a state criminal case cannot use the same procedures that they would use to obtain a subpoena for an out-of-state witness that they would for an in-state witness. To address that, the Uniform Act to Secure the Attendance of Witnesses from Without a State in Criminal Proceedings was created. It provides a mechanism and processes for a state prosecutor or defense attorney in a state criminal case to seek to require a witness from another state to testify (or provide documents) in his state.

The Uniform Law to Secure the Attendance of Witnesses from Within or Without a State in Criminal Proceedings was drafted by the National Conference of Commissioners on Uniform State Laws. It was drafted by the Conference at its 46th annual meeting in September 1931 in Atlantic City, New Jersey, in cooperation with the American Law Institute. It was revised in August 1936 in Boston, Massachusetts, in cooperation with the Interstate Commission on Crime, which also approved it that month. The American Bar Association approved it in September 1931, and re-approved it in August 1936. The Conference recommended its adoption in all jurisdictions.

By 1959, 42 state legislatures and the Puerto Rico legislature had adopted it. That year, the U.S. Supreme Court sustained the Act in New York v. O'Neill, 359 U.S. 1 (1959), in an opinion written by Justice Felix Frankfurter . By 2012, all states in the United States had adopted the Uniform Law, starting with North Dakota in 1931 and ending with Alabama in 1977.

== Provisions ==
The law includes provisions for seeking attendance of out-of-state witnesses at criminal proceedings (or submission of documents) in the originating state's courts on a showing of materiality, necessity, and the absence of any contravening public policy.

Obtaining a subpoena under the Uniform Act requires the filing of a timely motion asking a court in State A (where the trial will take place) to issue a certificate order that formally asks a court in State B to summon a witness to appear in State A or to provide documents in State A (a subpoena duces tecum). That motion must contain convincing evidence that the witness is a material witness in a State A criminal prosecution. A merely conclusory statement that the witness is material, simply asserting it, is not sufficient. If the State A court grants the motion, it will issue a certificate that can be filed in a court in State B where the witness lives. The State B court would then hold a "materiality hearing" to decide whether—in the opinion of the State B court—the witness should be required to testify in State A (or provide documents there). Among other things, at that hearing the State B court considers whether it is convinced that the witness is in fact a material and "necessary" witness, whether the testimony would be cumulative, whether compelling the witness would cause undue hardship, and whether there are public policy grounds pursuant to which the court should deny the request. The burden of proof at the materiality hearing is on the party requesting the subpoena.

== See also ==
- List of uniform acts (United States)
