= List of United States Supreme Court cases, volume 359 =

This is a list of all the United States Supreme Court cases from volume 359 of the United States Reports:

Case name	Citation	Date decided
New York v. O'Neill	359 U.S. 1	1959
Harris v. United States	359 U.S. 19	1959
Aho v. Jacobsen	359 U.S. 25	1959
The Lisholt	359 U.S. 26	1959
New Jersey v. United States	359 U.S. 27	1959
Brown-Forman Distillers Corp. v. Collector of Revenue	359 U.S. 28	1959
E.T. & W.N.C. Transp. Co. v. Currie	359 U.S. 28	1959
United States v. Embassy Restaurant, Inc.	359 U.S. 29	1959
Brown v. United States	359 U.S. 41	1959
Ganger v. Miami	359 U.S. 64	1959
Townsend v. Sain	359 U.S. 64	1959
SEC v. Variable Annuity Life Ins. Co.	359 U.S. 65	1959
Tak Shan Fong v. United States	359 U.S. 102	1959
Sims v. United States	359 U.S. 108	1959
Spevack v. Strauss	359 U.S. 115	1959
Page v. United States	359 U.S. 116	1959
Joseph v. Indiana	359 U.S. 117	1959
Woody v. United States	359 U.S. 118	1959
City of Los Angeles v. Pub. Util. Comm'n	359 U.S. 119	1959
Handford v. United States	359 U.S. 120	1959
Cephas v. West Virginia	359 U.S. 120	1959
Bartkus v. Illinois	359 U.S. 121	1959
Serv. Storage & Transfer Co. v. Virginia	359 U.S. 171	1959
The Monrosa	359 U.S. 180	1959
Abbate v. United States	359 U.S. 187	1959
Friedman v. United States	359 U.S. 205	1959
Teitelbaum v. California	359 U.S. 206	1959
Turner v. Kansas	359 U.S. 206	1959
Klor's, Inc. v. Broadway-Hale Stores, Inc.	359 U.S. 207	1959
Parsons v. Smith	359 U.S. 215	1959
Baker v. Tex. & Pa. R.R. Co.	359 U.S. 227	1959
Fosdick v. Linzell	359 U.S. 230	1959
Bristol v. Heaton	359 U.S. 230	1959
Glus v. Brooklyn E. Dist. Terminal	359 U.S. 231	1959
San Diego Building Trades Council v. Garmon	359 U.S. 236	1959
United States v. Shirey	359 U.S. 255	1959
Melrose Distillers, Inc. v. United States	359 U.S. 271	1959
Petty v. Tenn.-Mo. Bridge Comm'n	359 U.S. 275	1959
Mitchell v. Ky. Finance Co.	359 U.S. 290	1959
Robert C. Herd & Co. v. Krawill Mach. Corp.	359 U.S. 297	1959
Koller v. United States	359 U.S. 309	1959
Duluth S.S. & A.R.R. Co. v. Mich. Corp. & Sec. Comm'n	359 U.S. 310	1959
Whyte v. Coast Cities Coaches, Inc.	359 U.S. 310	1959
Braeburn Sec. Corp. v. Smith	359 U.S. 311	1959
Burke v. Bennett	359 U.S. 311	1959
Ohio ex rel. Iaus v. Carlton	359 U.S. 312	1959
McCann v. New York	359 U.S. 312	1959
Fore v. Toth	359 U.S. 313	1959
Riley v. New Jersey	359 U.S. 313	1959
United States v. Isthmian S.S. Co.	359 U.S. 314	1959
Felter v. S. Pac. Co.	359 U.S. 326	1959
Com. Communications, Inc. v. Pub. Util. Comm'n	359 U.S. 341	1959
Com. Barge Lines, Inc. v. United States	359 U.S. 342	1959
Don McCullagh, Inc. v. Michigan	359 U.S. 343	1959
Scull v. Virginia ex rel. Comm. on Law Reform	359 U.S. 344	1959
Plumbers v. Door Cnty.	359 U.S. 354	1959
Frank v. Maryland	359 U.S. 360	1959
FTC v. Mandel Bros., Inc.	359 U.S. 385	1959
Irvin v. Dowd	359 U.S. 394	1959
Arroyo v. United States	359 U.S. 419	1959
Grocery Drivers v. Seven Up Bottling Co.	359 U.S. 434	1959
Roman Cath. Parish v. Urban Redevelopment Auth.	359 U.S. 435	1959
Jehovah's Witnesses v. Mullen	359 U.S. 436	1959
Minney v. City of Azusa	359 U.S. 436	1959
Dick v. N.Y. Life Ins. Co.	359 U.S. 437	1959
T.I.M.E. Inc. v. United States	359 U.S. 464	1959
Patterson v. United States	359 U.S. 495	1959
DeVries v. Baumgartner's Elec. Constr. Co.	359 U.S. 498	1959
Anderson v. City of Cedar Rapids	359 U.S. 498	1959
Dyer v. SEC	359 U.S. 499	1959
Cady v. Iowa	359 U.S. 499	1959
Beacon Theatres, Inc. v. Westover	359 U.S. 500	1959
Bibb v. Navajo Freight Lines, Inc.	359 U.S. 520	1959
Crown Zellerbach Corp. v. Washington	359 U.S. 531	1959
S. Pac. Co. v. Corp. Comm'n	359 U.S. 532	1959
Rodgers v. Utah	359 U.S. 532	1959
State Athletic Comm'n v. Dorsey	359 U.S. 533	1959
In re Sarner	359 U.S. 533	1959
Lamar Bath House Co. v. City of Hot Springs	359 U.S. 534	1959
Chi. M. St. P. & P.R.R. Co. v. Illinois	359 U.S. 534	1959
Vitarelli v. Seaton	359 U.S. 535	1959
NAACP v. Williams	359 U.S. 550	1959
Siegel v. Ass'n of Bar of City of New York	359 U.S. 552	1959
Ohio ex rel. Klapp v. Dayton Power & Light Co.	359 U.S. 552	1959
