= Abbate v. United States =

- Supreme Court of the United States

Argued October 22, 1958 Decided March 30, 1959
- Full case name: Abbate v. United States
- Citations: 359 U.S. 187 (more) 79 S. Ct. 666; 3 L. Ed. 2d 729; 1959 U.S. LEXIS 1264

Case history
- Prior: 247 F.2d 410 (5th Cir. 1957); cert. granted, 355 U.S. 902 (1957).

Holding
- The double jeopardy Clause of the Fifth Amendment to the U.S. Constitution does not prohibit the prosecution of a conspiracy in federal court under federal law when that same conspiracy has already resulted in a conviction in state court under state law.

Court membership
- Chief Justice Earl Warren Associate Justices Hugo Black · Felix Frankfurter; William O. Douglas · Tom C. Clark; John M. Harlan II · William J. Brennan Jr. Charles E. Whittaker · Potter Stewart

Case opinions
- Majority: Brennan, joined by Frankfurter, Clark, Harlan, Whittaker, Stewart
- Concurrence: Brennan
- Dissent: Black, joined by Warren, Douglas

Laws applied
- U.S. Const. amend. V

Abbate v. United States, 359 U.S. 187 (1959), is a decision of the U.S. Supreme Court. The decision held that the double jeopardy Clause of the Fifth Amendment to the U.S. Constitution does not prohibit the prosecution of a conspiracy in federal court under federal law when that same conspiracy has already resulted in a conviction in state court under state law.

== Background ==
Abbate was part of a conspiracy to blow up multiple facilities owned by the Southern Bell Telephone Company. He was convicted in Illinois under a state law making it a crime to conspire to destroy the property of another and sentenced to three months of imprisonment. Thereafter, Abbate was indicted in federal district court for a violation of federal law stemming from the same conspiracy.

== Decision ==
The question presented in this case had already been decided by the Supreme Court in United States v. Lanza. Abbate asked that the Court overrule its prior decision, which the Court declined to do. The Court reasoned that overruling Lanza would result in serious and undesirable consequences. Particularly, the state conviction here resulted in only three months' imprisonment, while the federal conviction made up to five years of imprisonment available. The Court deemed this potential disparity to be problematic. The only way to ensure that federal law enforcement interests would be vindicated under such a regime would be to displace state power to prosecute actions that also constitute federal crimes, which would be a massive shift in the balance of criminal power as between the states and the federal government.

Justice Brennan wrote separately to address an additional argument that the government had presented but that was unnecessary to the resolution of the case. The government contended that the Double Jeopardy Clause should not be construed to bar separate prosecutions for the same acts when those prosecutions are based on different evidence and vindicate different interests. Brennan rejected this argument, noting that it could lead to harassment of defendants by empowering the government to prosecute the same people over and over again using different statutes that protect different interests.

The dissenters argued for reversal, relying on two arguments. First, they observed that most civilized countries recognized that a conviction elsewhere barred a conviction in their own jurisdiction. Second, they argued that the Double Jeopardy Clause was intended to represent a national policy against allowing the federal government to prosecute someone who had already been prosecuted in another court for an offense stemming from his actions.

== Facts ==
This case was decided the same day as Bartkus v. Illinois, a case with similar facts except the order of the convictions was reversed: the state conviction followed the federal conviction. The Supreme Court likewise did not find a double jeopardy violation.

This case is, along with Logan v. Zimmerman Brush Co., a rare example of the majority opinion's author writing a separate opinion concurring in his own majority opinion.
