= Corporate personhood =

Notion that corporations can have some legal rights, responsibilities and accountability

Corporate personhood or juridical personality is the legal notion that a juridical person such as a corporation, separately from its associated human beings (like owners, managers, shareholders, or employees), has at least some of the legal rights and responsibilities enjoyed by natural persons. In most countries, a corporation has the same rights as a natural person to hold property, enter into contracts, and to sue or be sued. Limited liability is said to be a privilege conferred by the state as a result of act of incorporating or forming a business.

== Early history ==
Ancient Indian society used legal personhood for political, social, and economic purposes. As early as 800 BC, legal personhood was granted to guild-like śreṇī that operated in the public interest. The late Roman Republic granted legal personhood to municipalities, public works companies that managed public services, and voluntary associations (collegia) such as the early Catholic Church. The diverse collegia had different rights and responsibilities that were independent of the individual members. Some collegia resembled later medieval guilds and were allowed to advance the needs of a trade as a whole, but collegia were otherwise barred from enriching their members.

In the Middle Ages, juridical persons were chartered either as corporations or as foundations in order to facilitate collective perpetual ownership of assets beyond the founders' lifespans, and to avoid their fragmentation and disintegration resulting from personal property inheritance laws. Later on, incorporation was advocated as an efficient and secure mode of economic development: advantages over existing partnership structures included the corporation's continuing existence if a member died; the ability to act without unanimity; and limited liability. The word corporation derives from the Latin corpus (“body”), and juridical personhood was often assumed in medieval writings. By the Renaissance period, European jurists routinely held that churches and universities chartered by the government could acquire property, enter into contracts, sue, and be sued independently of their members. The government or the Pope granted religious organizations the 'power of perpetual succession,' meaning that church property would neither revert to the local lord nor be taxed upon the death of church members. Some town charters explicitly granted medieval towns the right of self-governance. Commercial endeavors were not among the entities incorporated in the medieval era, and even risky trading companies were originally run as common-law partnerships rather than corporations; the incorporation of the East India Company monopoly in 1600 broke new ground, and by the end of the century, commercial ventures frequently sought incorporation in Europe and the Americas. By the 19th century, the direction of British and American corporate law had diverged; British law of this period (such as the Joint Stock Companies Act 1856) appeared to focus more on corporations that more closely resembled traditional joint ventures, while American law was driven by the need to manage a more diverse corporate landscape.

== Contemporary global approaches ==
=== Common law systems ===
==== United Kingdom ====
The UK, as the birthplace of modern corporate law, has a well-developed system of corporate personhood. Under British law, companies incorporated under the Companies Act have separate legal personality, allowing them to own property, enter contracts, and sue and be sued. The UK approach emphasizes regulatory oversight through Companies House.

==== Canada ====
Canadian corporate law recognizes corporate personhood through both federal and provincial incorporation systems. The Canada Business Corporations Act grants corporations most rights of natural persons, though limitations on political activities and constitutional rights differ from the US.

==== Australia ====
Australian corporations law, governed primarily by the Corporations Act 2001, provides for corporate personhood with conduct of business oversight through the Australian Securities and Investments Commission (ASIC).

=== Civil law systems ===
==== Germany ====
Under German law, corporations have legal personality separate from their shareholders. The German approach emphasizes stakeholder governance, with employee representation on corporate boards and strong regulatory frameworks that balance shareholder interests with broader societal concerns.

==== France ====
French corporate law recognizes legal personality through various corporate forms, including the société anonyme (SA) and société à responsabilité limitée (SARL). The French system emphasizes regulatory oversight and has specific provisions regarding corporate social responsibility that differ from Anglo-American approaches.

==== Japan ====
Japanese corporate law, influenced by both German civil law and Anglo-American traditions, recognizes corporate personhood through various corporate forms. The Japanese approach emphasizes stakeholder capitalism and long-term corporate governance, with less emphasis on shareholder primacy compared to some other systems.

== Country specific laws ==
=== India ===
Under Indian law the corporate, managing bodies, etc. and several other non-human entitles have been given the status of the "legal person". In court cases regarding corporate, the shareholders are not responsible for the company's debts but the company itself being a "legal person" is liable to repay those debts or be sued for the non-repayment of debts. The non-human entities given the "legal person" status by the law "have rights and co-relative duties; they can sue and be sued, can possess and transfer property". Since these non-human entities are "voiceless" they are legally represented "through guardians and representatives" to claim their legal rights and to fulfill their legal duties and responsibilities. Specific non-human entities given the status of "legal person" include "corporate personality, body politic, charitable unions etc.", as well as trust estates, deity, temples, churches, mosques, hospitals, universities, colleges, banks, railways, municipalities, and gram panchayats (village councils), rivers, all animals and birds.

=== In the United States ===
In a U.S. historical context, the phrase "corporate personhood" refers to the ongoing legal debate over the extent to which rights traditionally associated with natural persons should also be afforded to juridical persons including corporations. A headnote issued by the court reporter in the 1886 Supreme Court case Santa Clara County v. Southern Pacific Railroad Co. claimed to state the sense of the Court regarding the Equal Protection Clause of the Fourteenth Amendment as it applies to corporations, without the Court having actually made a decision or issued a written opinion on that point. This was the first time that the Supreme Court was reported to hold that the Fourteenth Amendment's equal protection clause granted constitutional protections to corporations as well as to natural persons, although numerous other cases, since Dartmouth College v. Woodward in 1819, had recognized that corporations were entitled to some of the protections of the Constitution. The corporate personhood holding in Southern Pacific Railroad Co. was dicta though, and the first ruling to establish corporate personhood as a matter of constitutional law was Pembina Consolidated Silver Mining Co. v. Pennsylvania, 125 U.S. 181 (1888), where Justice Stephen Johnson Field wrote for the Supreme Court that:

The inhibition of the amendment that no state shall deprive any person within its jurisdiction of the equal protection of the laws was designed to prevent any person or class of persons from being singled out as a special subject for discriminating and hostile legislation. Under the designation of "person" there is no doubt that a private corporation is included.

— Pembina Consolidated Silver Mining Co. v. Pennsylvania, 125 U.S. 181, 188-189 (1888)

U.S. courts have extended certain constitutional protections to corporations under various rationales. An early perspective, variously known as 'contractual', 'associate', or 'aggregate' theory, holds that owners of property have certain constitutional protections, even when the property is held via a corporation rather than directly under the owner's own name. Corporate attorney John Norton Pomeroy argued in the 1880s that "Statutes violating their prohibitions in dealing with corporations must necessarily infringe upon the rights of natural persons. In applying and enforcing these constitutional guaranties, corporations cannot be separated from the natural persons who compose them."

Similarly, proponents might argue a juridical person can be a device for exercising shareholders' rights to free speech. Under this perspective, such constitutional rights might also extend to other associations of people, even where the association does not take on the formal legal form of a corporation. A second perspective, known as the 'real entity' or 'natural entity' view, shifts the presumption of corporate regulation against the states.

The dominant view from the 1920s to the 1980s, championed by philosopher John Dewey, asserted that such perspectives are often overgeneralizations, and that the decision to grant corporate rights in a given sphere should be governed by the consequences of doing so. The 1980s saw an explosion of economic analyses, with a corporation often viewed as a nexus of contracts and as an economic agent appointed to act on behalf of its shareholders.

Some rulings combine multiple perspectives; the majority opinion in Citizens United argued both from an 'association' perspective ("if the antidistortion rationale were to be accepted... it would permit Government to ban political speech simply because the speaker is an association that has taken on the corporate form") and from a 'natural entity' perspective ("the worth of speech 'does not depend upon the identity of its source, whether corporation, association, union, or individual'").

Treating juridical persons as having legal rights allows corporations to sue and to be sued, provides a single entity for easier taxation and regulation, simplifies complex transactions that would otherwise involve, in the case of large corporations, thousands of people, and protects the individual rights of the shareholders as well as the right of association.

Generally, corporations are not able to claim constitutional protections that would not otherwise be available to persons acting as a group. For example, the Supreme Court has not recognized a Fifth Amendment right against self-incrimination for a corporation, since the right can be exercised only on an individual basis. In United States v. Sourapas and Crest Beverage Company, "[a]ppellants [suggested] the use of the word 'taxpayer' several times in the regulations requires the fifth-amendment self-incrimination warning be given to a corporation." The Court did not agree. Likewise, corporations and organizations do not have privacy rights under the Privacy Act of 1974, since the statute refers to any "individual," which it defines as "a citizen of the United States or an alien lawfully admitted for permanent residence."

Since the Supreme Court's ruling in Citizens United v. Federal Election Commission in 2010, upholding the rights of corporations to make unlimited political expenditures under the First Amendment, there have been several calls for a Constitutional amendment to abolish corporate personhood. The Citizens United majority opinion makes no reference to corporate personhood or the Fourteenth Amendment, but rather argues that political speech rights do not depend on the identity of the speaker, which could be a person or an association of people.

Individual shareholders cannot generally sue over the deprivation of a corporation's rights; only the board of directors has the standing to assert a corporation's constitutional rights in court.

==== Historical background in the United States ====
During the colonial era, British corporations were chartered by the crown to do business in North America. This practice continued in the early United States. They were often granted monopolies as part of the chartering process. For example, the controversial Bank Bill of 1791 chartered a 20-year corporate monopoly for the First Bank of the United States. Although the Federal government has from time to time chartered corporations, the general chartering of corporations has been left to the states. In the late 18th and early 19th centuries, corporations began to be chartered in greater numbers by the states, under general laws allowing for incorporation at the initiative of citizens, rather than through specific acts of the legislature.

The degree of permissible government interference in corporate affairs was controversial from the earliest days of the nation. In 1790, John Marshall, a private attorney and a veteran of the Continental Army, represented the board of the College of William and Mary, in litigation that required him to defend the corporation's right to reorganize itself and in the process remove professors, The Rev John Bracken v. The Visitors of Wm & Mary College (7 Va. 573; 1790 Supreme Court of Virginia). The Supreme Court of Virginia ruled that the original Crown charter provided the authority for the corporation's Board of Visitors to make changes including the reorganization.

As the 19th century matured, manufacturing in the U.S. became more complex as the Industrial Revolution generated new inventions and business processes. The favored form for large businesses became the corporation because the corporation provided a mechanism to raise the large amounts of investment capital large business required, especially for capital intensive yet risky projects such as railroads.

Following the reasoning of the Dartmouth College case and other precedents (see § Case law in the United States below), corporations could exercise the rights of their shareholders and these shareholders were entitled to some of the legal protections against arbitrary state action. Their cause was strengthened by the adoption of general incorporation statutes in the states in the late 19th century, most notably in New Jersey and Delaware, which allowed anyone to form corporations without any particular government grant or authorization, and thus without the government-granted monopolies that had been common in charters granted by the Crown or by acts of the legislature (see Delaware General Corporation Law).

==== Case law in the United States ====
In 1818, the United States Supreme Court decided Trustees of Dartmouth College v. Woodward – 17 U.S. 518 (1819), writing: "The opinion of the Court, after mature deliberation, is that this corporate charter is a contract, the obligation of which cannot be impaired without violating the Constitution of the United States. This opinion appears to us to be equally supported by reason, and by the former decisions of this Court." Beginning with this opinion, the U.S. Supreme Court has continuously recognized corporations as having the same rights as natural persons to contract and to enforce contracts.

Seven years after the Dartmouth College opinion, the Supreme Court decided Society for the Propagation of the Gospel in Foreign Parts v. Town of Pawlet (1823), in which an English corporation dedicated to missionary work, with land in the U.S., sought to protect its rights to the land under colonial-era grants against an effort by the state of Vermont to revoke the grants. Justice Joseph Story, writing for the court, explicitly extended the same protections to corporate-owned property as it would have to property owned by natural persons. Seven years later, Chief Justice Marshall stated: "The great object of an incorporation is to bestow the character and properties of individuality on a collective and changing body of men."

In Santa Clara County v. Southern Pacific Railroad Co., 118 U.S. 394 (1886), Chief Justice Morrison Waite orally directed the lawyers that the Equal Protection Clause of the Fourteenth Amendment recognizes legal entities as "persons" for purposes of constitutional law, and that the oral argument should focus on other issues in the case. In the case the court reporter, Bancroft Davis, noted in the headnote to the opinion that the Chief Justice Waite, began oral argument by stating:

"The Court does not wish to hear argument on the question whether the provision in the Fourteenth Amendment to the Constitution which forbids a state to deny to any person within its jurisdiction the equal protection of the laws applies to these corporations. We are all of opinion that it does. "

— Santa Clara County v. Southern Pacific Railroad Co., 118 U.S. 394, 396 (1886)

While the headnote was not part of the Court's opinion, and as dicta, not precedent, the Supreme Court would affirm two years later, with Pembina Consolidated Silver Mining Co. v. Pennsylvania (1888), in an opinion by Justice Stephen Johnson Field, that:

The inhibition of the amendment that no state shall deprive any person within its jurisdiction of the equal protection of the laws was designed to prevent any person or class of persons from being singled out as a special subject for discriminating and hostile legislation. Under the designation of "person" there is no doubt that a private corporation is included.

— Pembina Consolidated Silver Mining Co. v. Pennsylvania, 125 U.S. 181, 188-189 (1888)

The Pembina Consolidated Silver Mining Co. holding has been reaffirmed by the Court many times since.

==== Legislation in the United States ====
Federal statutes that refer to "persons" generally include both natural and juridical ones, unless a different definition is given. This general rule of interpretation is specified in Title 1, section 1 of the U.S. Code, known as the Dictionary Act, which states:

In determining the meaning of any Act of Congress, unless the context indicates otherwise—

the words "person" and "whoever" include corporations, companies, associations, firms, partnerships, societies, and joint stock companies, as well as individuals;

This federal statute has many consequences. For example, a corporation may enter contracts, sue and be sued, and be held liable under both civil and criminal law. Because the corporation is legally considered the "person", individual shareholders are not legally responsible for the corporation's debts and damages. Similarly, individual employees, managers, and directors are liable for their own malfeasance or lawbreaking while acting on behalf of the corporation, but are not generally liable for the corporation's actions.

Among the most frequently discussed and controversial consequences of corporate personhood in the United States is the extension of a limited subset of the same constitutional rights.

Corporations as juridical persons have always been able to perform commercial activities, similar to a person acting as a sole proprietor, such as entering into a contract or owning property. Therefore, corporations have always had a "juridical personality" for the purposes of conducting business while shielding individual shareholders from personal liability (i.e. protecting personal assets which were not invested in the corporation).

Ralph Nader, Phil Radford and others have argued that a strict originalist philosophy should reject the doctrine of corporate personhood under the Fourteenth Amendment. Indeed, Chief Justice William Rehnquist repeatedly criticized the Court's invention of corporate constitutional "rights", most famously in his dissenting opinion in the 1978 case First National Bank of Boston v. Bellotti; though, in Bellotti, Rehnquist's objections are based on his "views of the limited application of the First Amendment to the States" and not on whether corporations qualify as "persons" under the Fourteenth Amendment. Nonetheless, these justices' rulings have continued to affirm the assumption of corporate personhood, as the Waite court did, and Justice Rehnquist himself eventually endorsed the right of corporations to spend in elections (the majority view in Bellotti) in his dissenting opinion in McConnell v. FEC.

==== Corporate political spending ====
A central point of debate in recent years has been what role corporate money plays and should play in democratic politics. This is part of the larger debate on campaign finance reform and the role which money may play in politics.

In the United States, legal milestones in this debate include:

- Tillman Act of 1907, banned corporate political contributions to national campaigns.
- Federal Election Campaign Act of 1971, campaign financing legislation.
- 1974 Amendments to Federal Election Campaign Act provided for first comprehensive system of regulation, including limitations on the size of contributions and expenditures and prohibitions on certain entities from contributing or spending, disclosure, creation of the Federal Election Commission as a regulatory agency, and government funding of presidential campaigns.
- Buckley v. Valeo, 424 U.S. 1 (1976) upheld limits on campaign contributions, but held that spending money to influence elections is protected speech by the First Amendment.
- First National Bank of Boston v. Bellotti (1978) upheld the rights of corporations to spend money in non-candidate elections (i.e. ballot initiatives and referendums).
- Austin v. Michigan Chamber of Commerce (1990) upheld the right of the state of Michigan to prohibit corporations from using money from their corporate treasuries to support or oppose candidates in elections, noting: "[c]orporate wealth can unfairly influence elections."
- Bipartisan Campaign Reform Act of 2002 (McCain–Feingold), banned corporate funding of issue advocacy ads which mentioned candidates close to an election.
- McConnell v. Federal Election Commission (2003), substantially upheld McCain–Feingold.
- Federal Election Commission v. Wisconsin Right to Life, Inc. (2007) weakened McCain–Feingold, but upheld core of McConnell.
- Citizens United v. Federal Election Commission, 558 U.S. 844 (2010): the Supreme Court of the United States held that corporate funding of independent broadcasts of films about political subjects when there is an upcoming election cannot be limited under the First Amendment, overruling Austin (1990) and partly overruling McConnell (2003).
- Western Tradition Partnership, Inc. v. Attorney General of Montana (2012). U.S. Supreme Court summary reversal of a decision by the Montana Supreme Court holding that Citizens United did not preclude a Montana state law prohibiting corporate spending in elections.

The corporate personhood aspect of the campaign finance debate turns on Buckley v. Valeo (1976) and Citizens United v. Federal Election Commission (2010): Buckley ruled that political spending is protected by the First Amendment right to free speech, while Citizens United ruled that corporate political spending is protected, holding that corporations have a First Amendment right to free speech because they are "associations of citizens" and hold the collected rights of the individual citizens who constitute them.

== See also ==
- Anti-corporate activism
- Corporate behaviour
- Corporate governance
- History of central banking in the United States
- Electoral reform in the United States
- History of rail transport
- Industrial Revolution
- Juridical person
- Legal fiction § Corporate personhood
- Nonprofit:
  - Foundation (nonprofit)
  - Voluntary association
- Outline of corporate finance
- Persona designata
- The Corporation (film)
- University

Supreme Court cases

- Text of Dartmouth College v. Woodward, 17 U.S. 518 (1819) is available from: Findlaw
- Text of Slaughter-House Cases, 83 U.S. 36 (1872) is available from: Findlaw
- Text of Santa Clara County v. Southern Pacific Railroad, 118 U.S. 394 (1886) is available from: Findlaw Justia
- Text of Chicago, B&Q Railroad v. State of Iowa, 94 U.S. 155 (1876) is available from: Findlaw
- Text of Peik v. Chicago & Northwestern Railway, 94 U.S. 164 (1876) is available from: Findlaw
- Text of Chicago, Milwaukee, & St. Paul Railroad v. Ackley, 94 U.S. 179 (1876) is available from: Findlaw
- Text of Wheeling Steel Corp. v. Glander, 337 U.S. 562 (1949) is available from: Findlaw Internet Archive (docket files)
- Text of Yick Wo v. Hopkins, 118 U.S. 356 (1886) is available from: Findlaw
