= Kassel v. Consolidated Freightways Corp. =

- Supreme Court of the United States

Argued November 4, 1980 Decided March 24, 1981
- Full case name: Raymond Kassel, Director of the Iowa Department of Transportation, Iowa Governor Robert D. Ray, and state transportation officials Robert Rigler, L. Stanley Schoelerman, Donald Gardner, Jules Busker, Allan Thomas, Barbara Dunn, William McGrath, Jon McCoy, Charles W. Larson, Edward Dickinson, and Richard C. Turner v. Consolidated Freightways Corporation of Delaware
- Citations: 450 U.S. 662 (more) 101 S. Ct. 1309; 67 L. Ed. 2d 580; 1981 U.S. LEXIS 17; 49 U.S.L.W. 4328

Case history
- Prior: Appeal from the United States Court of Appeals for the Eighth Circuit

Holding
- Iowa's truck-length limitation violated the Dormant Commerce Clause.

Court membership
- Chief Justice Warren E. Burger Associate Justices William J. Brennan Jr. · Potter Stewart; Byron White · Thurgood Marshall; Harry Blackmun · Lewis F. Powell Jr. William Rehnquist · John P. Stevens

Case opinions
- Plurality: Powell, joined by White, Blackmun, Stevens
- Concurrence: Brennan, joined by Marshall
- Dissent: Rehnquist, joined by Burger, Stewart

Laws applied
- Article I, Section 8, Clause 3 of the United States Constitution

Kassel v. Consolidated Freightways Corp., 450 U.S. 662 (1981), was a United States Supreme Court case involving the application of the Dormant Commerce Clause to an Iowa state statute restricting the length of tractor-trailers.

== Facts ==
An Iowa statute restricted most truck combinations to 55 ft (17 m) in length. It did provide for some exceptions: doubles, mobile homes, and trucks that carried livestock or certain types of farm equipment were permitted to be 60 ft (18 m), and cities which abutted the state line were permitted to adopt the length limitations of the adjacent State. Deliverers of trucks or oversized mobile homes were required by law to obtain a permit before shipping the items into or out of the state.

Plaintiff Consolidated Freightways Corporation sued Raymond Kassel, director of the Iowa Department of Transportation, Iowa governor Robert Ray, and number of other state transportation officials in the United States District Court for the Southern District of Iowa, alleging that Iowa's statutory scheme unconstitutionally burdens interstate commerce. Iowa defended the statute as a reasonable safety measure enacted pursuant to its police power, asserting that 65-foot (20 m) double tractor-trailers are more dangerous than 55-foot singles, and that the law would improve safety and reduce the number of highway accidents by diverting truck traffic outside the state.

The District Court made the factual finding that 65-foot doubles were just as safe as 60-foot doubles and 55-foot semi-trailers. It then determined that the state law impermissibly burdened interstate commerce, holding that the relatively slight benefit of the law in improving safety and reducing casualties was outweighed by the federal interest in promoting commerce between the States. The United States Court of Appeals for the Eighth Circuit affirmed, noting that the only apparent safety benefit to Iowa was that resulting from forcing large trucks to detour around the State, thereby reducing overall truck traffic on Iowa's highways. The Court of Appeals noted that this was not a constitutionally permissible interest. It also commented that the several statutory exemptions identified above, such as those applicable to border cities and the shipment of livestock, suggested that the law in effect benefited Iowa residents at the expense of interstate traffic.

== Plurality opinion ==
Justice Powell wrote the plurality opinion, in which Justices White, Blackmun, and Stevens joined. He analogized the case to Raymond Motor Transportation, Inc. v. Rice, which concerned a similar law in the State of Wisconsin. In Rice, the Court used a balancing test which compares the nature of the State’s regulatory concern with the extent of the burden to interstate commerce. Powell found this law to be a great burden on interstate commerce with only an “illusory” safety interest.

Powell reexamined the evidence on the record and determined that the State failed to meet its burden of proof to show that there was any statistically significant difference in safety between the 55-foot and 65-foot trucks. Moreover, the statute could potentially create more accidents, by forcing shippers to use more small trucks to carry the same quantity of goods, or force truck traffic to bypass the State of Iowa, shifting traffic (and a higher incidence of accidents) to adjacent states. Powell further rejected the State’s contention that deference to the state legislature was in order, because the statute created such a burden to out-of-state residents, and the legislative history of the “border-cities” exemption suggested that Iowa’s real purpose in enacting this law was to discriminate against out-of-state businesses.

== Concurrence ==
Justice Brennan concurred in the judgment, joined by Justice Thurgood Marshall. He suggested a new, three-factor test for the Dormant Commerce Clause:

1. The courts are not empowered to second-guess the empirical judgments of lawmakers concerning the utility of legislation.
2. The burdens imposed on commerce must be balanced against the local benefits actually sought to be achieved by the State's lawmakers, and not against those suggested after the fact by counsel.
3. Protectionist legislation is unconstitutional under the Commerce Clause, even if the burdens and benefits are related to safety rather than economics.

450 U.S. at 679-680.

In this analysis, Brennan suggested greater deference to the state legislature and better examination of the legislative history of the statute in dispute, rather than giving credence to the factual record created at trial by the State’s attorneys. However, protectionist legislation such as this, which shifts burdens and expenses to other states, does not require such deference. Brennan would create a per se invalidity rule for such laws.

== Dissent ==
Justice Rehnquist wrote the dissenting opinion, in which Chief Justice Burger and Justice Stewart joined. Rehnquist noted that every state has truck-length regulations, and that this law is not the oddity that the majority claims it to be. He would have utilized rational basis review, instead of making new factual findings at trial and then using those findings to determine the validity of the legislation. He worried that the Court’s ruling basically forced Iowa to bow to the policy choices of neighboring states, when the power to make such interstate regulations is vested in Congress by the Constitution. He further argued that the court was reading too much into the motives of the legislature in enacting the statute.

Rehnquist further argues that it was error to portray Iowa's statute as protectionist because it is nearly impossible to separate the safety and protectionist motives of the law.

Whenever a State enacts more stringent safety measures than its neighbors, in an area which affects commerce, the safety law will have the incidental effect of deflecting interstate commerce to the neighboring States.

== See also ==
- Bibb v. Navajo Freight Lines, Inc.: 1959 U.S. Supreme Court case applying the Dormant Commerce Clause to interstate trucking safety regulations
- List of United States Supreme Court cases, volume 450
