= Beacon Theatres, Inc. v. Westover =

Beacon Theatres v. Westover
- Supreme Court of the United States

Argued December 10, 1958 Decided May 25, 1959
- Full case name: Beacon Theatres, Incorporated v. Westover, United States District Judge, et al.
- Citations: 359 U.S. 500 (more) 79 S. Ct. 948; 3 L. Ed. 2d 988; 1959 U.S. LEXIS 1934; 2 Fed. R. Serv. 2d (Callaghan) 650

Case history
- Prior: Certiorari to the United States Court of Appeals for the Ninth Circuit, 252 F.2d 864 (9th Cir. 1958)

Holding
- Only under the most imperative circumstances can right to jury trial of legal issues be lost through prior determination of equitable claims.

Court membership
- Chief Justice Earl Warren Associate Justices Hugo Black · Felix Frankfurter; William O. Douglas · Tom C. Clark; John M. Harlan II · William J. Brennan Jr. Charles E. Whittaker · Potter Stewart

Case opinions
- Majority: Black, joined by Warren, Douglas, Clark, Brennan
- Dissent: Stewart, joined by Harlan, Whittaker
- Frankfurter took no part in the consideration or decision of the case.

Laws applied
- U.S. Const. amend. VII

Beacon Theatres, Inc. v. Westover, 359 U.S. 500 (1959), was a case decided by the Supreme Court of the United States dealing with jury trials in civil matters. The court held that where legal and equitable claims are joined in the same action, the legal claims must be tried by a jury before the equitable claims can be resolved.

Cornell Law School's Legal Information Institute summarized it like this:

In Beacon Theatres v. Westover, the Court held that a district court erred in trying all issues itself in an action in which the plaintiff sought a declaratory judgment and an injunction barring the defendant from instituting an antitrust action against it, and the defendant had filed a counterclaim alleging violation of the antitrust laws and asking for treble damages. It did not matter, the Court ruled, that the equitable claims had been filed first and the law counterclaims involved allegations common to the equitable claims. Subsequent jury trial of these issues would probably be precluded by collateral estoppel, hence "only under the most imperative circumstances which in view of the flexible procedures of the Federal Rules we cannot now anticipate, can the right to a jury trial of legal issues be lost through prior determination of equitable claims."

The question was whether the exclusive agreement of Fox Theatres with the distributor Westover for first-run movies was reasonable.

== See also ==
- List of United States Supreme Court cases, volume 359
- Fox Theatres
- Seventh Amendment to the United States Constitution
- Galloway v. United States
- Dairy Queen, Inc. v. Wood, 369 U.S. 469.
- Ross v. Berhard
