= New York v. O'Neill =

- Supreme Court of the United States

Argued November 20, 1958 Decided March 2, 1959
- Full case name: New York v. O'Neill
- Citations: 359 U.S. 1 (more) 27 U.SJ.. Week 4189

Case history
- Prior: In re O'Neill, 100 So. 2d 149 (Fla. 1958).

Holding
- A Florida statute, established by the enactment of the Uniform Law to Secure the Attendance of Witnesses from Within or Without a State in Criminal Proceedings, on its face does not violate the Privileges and Immunities Clause of Art. IV, § 2 of the Constitution nor the Privileges and Immunities or Due Process Clause of the Fourteenth Amendment.

Court membership
- Chief Justice Earl Warren Associate Justices Hugo Black · Felix Frankfurter; William O. Douglas · Tom C. Clark; John M. Harlan II · William J. Brennan Jr. Charles E. Whittaker · Potter Stewart

Case opinions
- Majority: Frankfurter
- Dissent: Douglas, joined by Black

New York v. O'Neill, 359 U.S. 1 (1959), was a United States Supreme Court case in which the Court held that a Florida statute, established by the enactment of the Uniform Law to Secure the Attendance of Witnesses from Within or Without a State in Criminal Proceedings which established a procedure for a witness to be subpoened with the agreement of a court in a trial state and a court in the state of the witness, on its face does not violate the Privileges and Immunities Clause of Art. IV, § 2 of the Constitution nor the Privileges and Immunities or Due Process Clause of the Fourteenth Amendment. At the time, the uniform law had been adopted in 42 states of the United States, as well as Puerto Rico.

Justice Felix Frankfurter wrote the opinion for the court. Justice William O. Douglas, joined by Justice Hugo Black, dissented. The dissenting justices were of the view that a state could only require a person to travel from one state to another if he were a fugitive from justice.

== See also ==
- List of U.S. Supreme Court cases, vol. 359 of the United States Reports
