= Bell v. Wolfish =

- Supreme Court of the United States

Argued January 16, 1979 Decided May 14, 1979
- Full case name: Griffin Bell, Attorney General, et al. v. Wolfish, et al.
- Citations: 441 U.S. 520 (more) 99 S. Ct. 1861; 60 L. Ed. 2d 447; 1979 U.S. LEXIS 100

Case history
- Prior: U.S. ex rel. Wolfish v. Levi, 439 F. Supp. 114 (S.D.N.Y. 1977), aff'd in part, rev'd in part sub nom. Wolfish v. Levi, 573 F.2d 118 (2d Cir. 1978); cert. granted, 439 U.S. 816 (1978).
- Subsequent: Vacated and remanded, Wolfish v. Levi, 681 F.2d 803 (2d Cir. 1981).

Holding
- The Fourth Amendment does not prohibit strip searches and similar intrusive conduct against persons being held in federal detention while awaiting trial.

Court membership
- Chief Justice Warren E. Burger Associate Justices William J. Brennan Jr. · Potter Stewart; Byron White · Thurgood Marshall; Harry Blackmun · Lewis F. Powell Jr. William Rehnquist · John P. Stevens

Case opinions
- Majority: Rehnquist, joined by Burger, Stewart, White, Blackmun
- Concur/dissent: Powell
- Dissent: Marshall
- Dissent: Stevens, joined by Brennan

Laws applied
- U.S. Const., amend. IV

Bell v. Wolfish, 441 U.S. 520 (1979), is a case in which the United States Supreme Court addressed the constitutionality of various conditions of confinement of inmates held in federal short-term detention facilities. The Court narrowly found that while treatment of pre-trial detainees is subject to constraint by the First, Fifth, and Fourteenth Amendments,^{[2]} all of the policies challenged in the case passed constitutional scrutiny.

== Factual background ==
Inmates at the Metropolitan Correctional Center (MCC) filed a class action suit challenging the constitutionality of several conditions of their confinement. Opened in 1975 in New York City, the MCC served as a federally-operated short-term detention facility mainly for defendants awaiting trial at one of three federal district courts located in the New York City area. Though the MCC was initially constructed to house some 449 inmates, administrators were quickly forced to double-bunk inmates to accommodate the "unprecedented" increase in new detainees. In their complaint, petitioners argued that this practice of double-bunking inmates awaiting trial was unconstitutional. They also made claims against various MCC policies, including the "undue length of confinement, improper searches, inadequate recreational, educational, and employment opportunities, insufficient staff, and objectionable restrictions on the purchase and receipt of personal items and books."

== Procedural history ==
After certifying the case as a class action, the U.S. District Court for the Southern District of New York enjoined the MCC practices challenged by petitioners, holding that inmates could only be deprived of liberty as a matter of "compelling necessity." On appeal, the U.S. Court of Appeals for the Second Circuit affirmed nearly all of the District Court's rulings, including the due process standard the District Court utilized in enjoining the MCC's practices. The Court of Appeals did not affirm the District Court's Eighth Amendment analysis related to convicted inmates at the MCC awaiting sentencing or transfer, and instead remanded that issue to the District Court.

The Supreme Court of the United States granted certiorari on October 2, 1978.

== Majority opinion ==
=== Double-bunking ===
In its majority opinion, the Supreme Court reversed the Court of Appeals. First, it noted that the “compelling necessity” standard on which the Court of Appeals relied was not grounded in the Constitution. Rather, the Court held, in order to evaluate whether conditions of pre-trial confinement violate an inmate's guarantee of due process, a court must determine whether those conditions “amount to punishment of the detainee”. Because the MCC's practice of double-bunking did not amount to punishment, the policy did not violate the due process clause of the Fifth Amendment.^{[2][3]}

=== Other challenged practices ===
The Court also determined that the policy of prohibiting detainees from receiving hard-cover books not mailed directly from the publisher did not violate the First Amendment. In addition, the Court held that the practice of prohibiting detainees from receiving packages from outside the facility was not a due process violation under the Fifth Amendment. Nor, in the Court's opinion, was the practice of performing body cavity searches on detainees after contact visits a violation of the Fourth Amendment.

Finally, the Court held that none of these practices constituted punishment within the meaning of the Fifth Amendment.
