= Wheeling Steel Corp. v. Glander =

Wheeling Steel Corp. v. Glander, Tax Commissioner of Ohio
- Supreme Court of the United States

Argued March 29, 1949 Decided June 20, 1949
- Full case name: Wheeling Steel Corporation v. Glander
- Citations: 337 U.S. 562 (more) 69 S. Ct. 1291; 93 L. Ed. 2d 1544; 1949 U.S. LEXIS 2150

Holding
- Ohio's ad valorem tax on foreign corporations' accounts receivable violated the Equal Protection Clause of the 14th Amendment.

Court membership
- Chief Justice Fred M. Vinson Associate Justices Hugo Black · Stanley F. Reed; Felix Frankfurter · William O. Douglas; Frank Murphy · Robert H. Jackson; Wiley B. Rutledge · Harold H. Burton

Case opinions
- Majority: Jackson, joined by Vinson, Frankfurter, Rutledge, Reed, Burton
- Concurrence: Jackson
- Dissent: Douglas, joined by Black

Laws applied
- Fourteenth Amendment to the United States Constitution

Wheeling Steel Corp. v. Glander, 337 U.S. 562 (1949), was a United States Supreme Court case in which two out-of-state corporations objected to ad valorem taxes imposed upon accounts receivable derived from goods manufactured in Ohio, though these accounts were not used in conducting business in Ohio. The court ruled that the tax violated the Equal Protection Clause of the 14th Amendment.

== Background ==
Wheeling Steel Corp., incorporated in Delaware was authorized to do business in Ohio, and maintained four of its eight manufacturing plants in Ohio. Wheeling's general offices were/are in Wheeling, West Virginia and had sales offices in twelve other states, including Ohio. All accounts were billed and collected from the corporation's main office in Wheeling, West Virginia.

National Distillers Products Corporation was incorporated in Virginia and maintained its principal place of business in New York. National Distillers was admitted to do business in Ohio and maintained both a distillery and a warehouse in Ohio, as well as maintaining distilleries and warehouses in six other states. National Distillers operated its payroll through the local offices and conducted all other fiscal affairs from its office in New York. National Distillers did not maintain a sales office in Ohio; orders from Ohio were forwarded to the office in New York for approval.

Both appellants paid all taxes required to do business in Ohio, all taxes on real and personal property in Ohio, and all franchise taxes. Additionally, Wheeling paid ad valorem taxes to West Virginia on all accounts receivable, including on those accounts receivable taxed by Ohio, pursuant to Wheeling Steel Corp. v. Fox, 298 US 193. National Distillers' accounts receivable were taxed by neither Virginia nor New York.

The Ohio Tax Commissioner assessed ad valorem taxes on accounts receivable derived from shipments originating from Ohio manufacturing plants belonging to Wheeling Steel Corporation and National Distillers Products Corporation on the grounds that such accounts "result from the sale of property from a stock of goods maintained within the state." The Board of Tax Appeals affirmed both assessments.

Both appellants appealed the Tax Board's decision. The Supreme Court of Ohio affirmed the tax in both cases, which were then brought before the Supreme Court of the United States.

== Opinion of the Court ==
The court held that the ad valorem tax assessed against the accounts receivable of these corporations violated the Equal Protection Clause of the 14th Amendment. The court declined to address the issue of whether Ohio violated the Due Process Clause in assessing this tax. The court pointed out that Ohio was not required to admit these foreign corporations to do business within Ohio, and could have limited the terms that these corporations could conduct business within Ohio, so long as any limits did not violate rights derived from the Constitution. Instead, Ohio chose to admit these corporations to conduct business in Ohio, a privilege that these corporations paid taxes to secure and maintain. Because Ohio chose to domesticate these foreign corporations, these corporations became entitled to equal protection with all other domestic corporations established under Ohio law. Ohio's ad valorem tax impermissibly discriminates between domestic and foreign corporations, denying appellants equal protection under Ohio law.

== Dissent ==
Mr. Justice Douglas is troubled by the notion that corporations are to be classified as people for the purpose of interpreting the Equal Protection Clause. The dissent points out that other clauses in the Constitution that refer to people or persons do not apply to corporations. To read that a reference to persons in the Equal Protection Clause includes corporations as persons is inconsistent and should not be presumed.

== See also ==
- List of United States Supreme Court cases, volume 337
- Logan v. Zimmerman Brush Co., another U.S. Supreme Court case in which the justice writing for the Court also writes a separate opinion in his own voice.
