= Boddie v. Connecticut =

- Supreme Court of the United States

Argued December 8, 1969 Reargued November 17, 1970 Decided March 2, 1971
- Full case name: Boddie, et al. v. Connecticut, et al.
- Citations: 401 U.S. 371 (more) 91 S. Ct. 780; 28 L. Ed. 2d 113; 1971 U.S. LEXIS 73

Case history
- Prior: 286 F. Supp. 968 (D. Conn. 1968) (reversed)

Holding
- Due process prohibits a state from denying, solely because of inability to pay, access to its courts to individuals who sought judicial dissolution of their marriages.

Court membership
- Chief Justice Warren E. Burger Associate Justices Hugo Black · William O. Douglas; John M. Harlan II · William J. Brennan Jr. Potter Stewart · Byron White; Thurgood Marshall · Harry Blackmun

Case opinions
- Majority: Harlan, joined by Burger, Stewart, Marshall, White, Blackmun
- Concurrence: Douglas
- Concurrence: Brennan
- Dissent: Black

Laws applied
- U.S. Const. Amend. XIV

Boddie v. Connecticut, 401 U.S. 371 (1971), was a case before the United States Supreme Court.

== Background ==
=== Complaint ===
A class action was formed representing female welfare recipients residing in Connecticut and wishing divorces, but prevented from bringing divorce suits by Connecticut statutes requiring payment of court fees and costs for service of process as a condition precedent to access to the courts. There was no dispute as to their inability to pay the court fees or costs.

Plaintiffs sought a judgment declaring the statutes (requirements for payment of court fees and costs for service of process that restricted their access to the courts in an effort to bring an action for divorce) invalid as applied to the class, and an injunction requiring defendants to permit members of the class to sue for divorce without payment of any fees and costs.

=== United States District Court for the District of Connecticut ===
A three-judge court dismissed the complaint for failure to state a claim (286 F Supp 968). It held that a State could limit access to its divorce courts by the requirement of a filing fee or other fees, even when they effectively barred appellants from commencing actions therein.

== Opinion of the court ==
On appeal, the Supreme Court of the United States reversed. The opinion by Justice Harlan expressed the views of six members of the court.

The Supreme Court concluded that, given the basic position of the marriage relationship in this society's hierarchy of values and the concomitant state monopolization of the means for legally dissolving this relationship, due process did prohibit a state from denying, solely because of inability to pay, access to its courts to individuals who sought judicial dissolution of their marriages. Thus, the Court held that a state could not, consistent with the obligations imposed on it by the Due Process Clause of the Fourteenth Amendment, pre-empt the right to dissolve this legal relationship without affording all citizens access to the means it had prescribed for doing so.

=== Concurrences ===
Justice Douglas concurred in the result on the ground that the equal protection clause rather than the due process clause was the proper basis of decision.

Justice Brennan concurred on the ground that while denying indigents access to the courts for nonpayment of a fee is a denial of due process, it is also a denial of equal protection of the laws, and no distinction can be drawn between divorce suits and other actions.

=== Dissent ===
Justice Black dissented on the ground that charging practically nominal initial court costs in civil actions does not violate either the due process or equal protection clause. He asserted that nowhere in the Constitution was marriage mentioned, thus (as per the Tenth Amendment) reserving dissolution procedures as the state's prerogative.

== See also ==
- List of United States Supreme Court cases
- List of United States Supreme Court cases, volume 401
