= Parratt v. Taylor =

- Supreme Court of the United States

Argued March 2, 1981 Decided May 18, 1981
- Full case name: Parratt, et al. v. Taylor
- Citations: 451 U.S. 527 (more) 101 S. Ct. 1908; 68 L. Ed. 2d 420; 1981 U.S. LEXIS 99; 49 U.S.L.W. 4509

Case history
- Prior: Taylor v. Parratt, 620 F.2d 307 (8th Cir. 1980); cert. granted, 449 U.S. 917 (1980).

Holding
- Procedural due process guarantees only a post-deprivation hearing, provision of a right to sue in state court was provision of that hearing.

Court membership
- Chief Justice Warren E. Burger Associate Justices William J. Brennan Jr. · Potter Stewart; Byron White · Thurgood Marshall; Harry Blackmun · Lewis F. Powell Jr. William Rehnquist · John P. Stevens

Case opinions
- Majority: Rehnquist, joined by Burger, Brennan, Stewart, White, Blackmun, Stevens
- Concurrence: Stewart
- Concurrence: White
- Concurrence: Blackmun
- Concurrence: Powell
- Concur/dissent: Marshall
- Overruled by
- Daniels v. Williams, 474 U.S. 327 (1986)

Parratt v. Taylor, 451 U.S. 527 (1981), was a case decided by the United States Supreme Court, in which the court considered the applicability of Due Process to a claim brought under Section 1983.

== Background ==
The respondent was an inmate at the Nebraska Penal and Correctional Complex who had ordered hobby materials by mail. When the hobby materials were lost, he brought suit under 42 U.S.C. section 1983 to recover their value, $23.50.

== Opinion of the Court ==
The Court held that when procedural due process guarantees only a post-deprivation hearing, provision of a right to sue in state court was provision of that hearing.

The Court found that the deprivation did not occur as the result of some established state procedure, but as the result of the unauthorized failure of state agents to follow established state procedure, and because Nebraska had a tort claims procedure that provided a remedy to persons who had suffered a tortious loss at the hands of the State, but which respondent did not use, such procedure could have fully compensated respondent for his property loss and were sufficient to satisfy the requirements of due process.

The Court found that although the respondent was deprived of property under color of state law, he had not sufficiently alleged a violation of the Due Process Clause of the Fourteenth Amendment.

The Court also held that a merely negligent deprivation of property under color of state law was actionable under 42 U.S.C. § 1983. This holding was mostly overruled by Daniels v. Williams in 1986, which held that a 1983 action only lies for an intentional deprivation of rights. The only aspect of Parratt that remains good law is that a claimant must prove any possible state remedies are constitutionally deficient in order to proceed with a 1983 action.

== Subsequent jurisprudence ==
=== Logan v. Zimmerman Brush Co. ===
The year after Parratt, the Court decided Logan v. Zimmerman Brush Co., another case where the adequacy of the procedure was held to be insufficient and a denial of the petitioner's due process rights. Logan had filed a complaint with Illinois's Fair Employment Practices Commission, the exclusive forum under state law for the resolution of his claim that Zimmerman had fired him after a month primarily because of his disability. His timely filed claim was administratively dismissed with prejudice after the commission accidentally scheduled a required fact-finding conference five days after the deadline for doing so. At Zimmerman's request, the Supreme Court of Illinois issued a writ of prohibition against the FEPC, disallowing further processing of the claim, and Logan petitioned the U.S. Supreme Court for certiorari.

The Court sided unanimously with Logan, holding that he had been denied due process due to the state's incompetence and overly rigid adherence to the statute. Justice Harry Blackmun wrote both the opinion of the Court as well as an unusual separate concurrence holding that Logan's equal protection rights had also been denied, with Justice Lewis Powell agreeing in his own concurrence but cautioning that the Court's holding should have been limited to the specific facts of the case. Zimmerman had argued that per Parratt, Logan should have been allowed to avail himself of postdeprivation remedies, but Blackmun said that "missed Parratt's point", as the earlier case had involved a random unforeseeable act of negligence for which no predeprivation hearing was possible, whereas Logan's deprivation had come about as a result of the operation of law.
