= Bartkus v. Illinois =

- Supreme Court of the United States

Argued November 19, 1957 Reargued October 21–22, 1958 Decided March 30, 1959
- Full case name: Bartkus v. Illinois
- Citations: 359 U.S. 121 (more) 79 S. Ct. 676; 3 L. Ed. 2d 684; 1959 U.S. LEXIS 1824

Case history
- Prior: Affirmed by an equally divided Court January 6, 1958, 355 U.S. 281. Rehearing granted, judgment vacated and case restored to calendar for reargument May 26, 1958, 356 U. S. 969.

Holding
- Coordination of federal officials with state officials did not implicate the double jeopardy Clause of the Fifth Amendment to the U.S. Constitution. It also held that a defendant may be acquitted of a federal crime and convicted of a state crime, even if those crimes share the same evidence, without violating the Due Process Clause of the Fourteenth Amendment.

Court membership
- Chief Justice Earl Warren Associate Justices Hugo Black · Felix Frankfurter; William O. Douglas · Tom C. Clark; John M. Harlan II · William J. Brennan Jr. Charles E. Whittaker · Potter Stewart

Case opinions
- Majority: Frankfurter, joined by Clark, Harlan, Whittaker, Stewart
- Dissent: Black, joined by Warren, Douglas
- Dissent: Brennan, joined by Warren, Douglas

Laws applied
- U.S. Const. amend. V

Bartkus v. Illinois, 359 U.S. 121 (1959), is a decision of the U.S. Supreme Court. The decision held that coordination of federal officials with state officials did not implicate the double jeopardy Clause of the Fifth Amendment to the U.S. Constitution. It also held that a defendant may be acquitted of a federal crime and convicted of a state crime, even if those crimes share the same evidence, without violating the Due Process Clause of the Fourteenth Amendment.

The case established the dual sovereign exception to the Double Jeopardy Clause, enabling state and federal prosecutions for substantially similar events.
