= Constitutional law of the United States =

The constitutional law of the United States is the body of law governing the interpretation and implementation of the United States Constitution. The subject concerns the scope of power of the United States federal government compared to the individual states and the fundamental rights of individuals. The ultimate authority upon the interpretation of the Constitution and the constitutionality of statutes, state and federal, lies with the Supreme Court of the United States.

== The Supreme Court ==
=== Judicial review ===
Early in its history, in Marbury v. Madison (1803) and Fletcher v. Peck (1810), the Supreme Court of the United States declared that the judicial power granted to it by Article III of the United States Constitution included the power of judicial review, to consider challenges to the constitutionality of a State or Federal law. The holding in these cases empowered the Supreme Court to strike down enacted laws that were contrary to the Constitution. In this role, for example, the Court has struck down state laws for failing to conform to the Contract Clause (see, e.g., Dartmouth College v. Woodward), the Equal Protection Clause (see, e.g., Brown v. Board of Education), or the Commerce Clause of the Constitution (see, e.g., United States v. Lopez).

==== Scope and effect ====
The Supreme Court's interpretations of constitutional law are binding on the legislative and executive branches of the federal government, on the lower courts in the federal system, and on all state courts. This system of binding interpretations or precedents evolved from the common law system (called "stare decisis"), where courts are bound by their own prior decisions and by the decisions of higher courts. Neither English common law courts nor continental civil law courts had the power to declare legislation unconstitutional, the United States Supreme Court has long held the power to declare federal or state legislation unconstitutional.

==== Justiciability ====
Federal courts consider other doctrines before allowing a lawsuit to go forward:

- Actual dispute – the lawsuit concerns a "case or controversy" under the meaning of Article III, Section 2 of the U.S. Constitution
- Standing – the party bringing the suit must have (1) a particularized and concrete injury, (2) a causal connection between the complained-of conduct and that injury, and (3) a likelihood that a favorable court decision will redress the injury
- Ripeness – a party will lack standing where his/her case raises abstract, hypothetical or conjectural questions.
- Mootness – a party is seeking redress over a case that no longer has a basis for dispute, though there are limited exceptions
- Political question – the issues raised in the suit are unreviewable because the Constitution relegates it to another branch of government.

The Supreme Court prohibits itself from issuing advisory opinions where there is no actual case or controversy before them.(See Muskrat v. United States, 219 U.S. 346 (1911)).

=== Differing views on the role of the Court ===
There are a number of ways that commentators and Justices of the Supreme Court have defined the Court's role, and its jurisprudential method:

- Originalism is a family of similar theories that hold that the Constitution has a fixed meaning from an authority contemporaneous with its ratification, and that it should be construed in light of that authority. Generally, originalism stands for the principle that the Constitution should be interpreted according to its meaning in the late 18th century. Prominent adherents include Antonin Scalia and Clarence Thomas.
- Purposivism is "an approach that places more emphasis on statutory purpose and congressional intent," practiced notably by Stephen Breyer.
- Judicial restraint is the idea that the Supreme Court should decide as few cases as possible and on the narrowest possible grounds in order to allow the democratic process to play out without judicial interference wherever possible. Oliver Wendell Holmes Jr. and Felix Frankfurter are often associated this approach.
- Instrumentalism is the approach that society and the law complement and ought to reflect each other, generally leading to the law shifting with public opinion. Ruth Bader Ginsburg was a notable jurist who utilized this philosophy.

== Federalism ==
Political power in the United States is divided under a scheme of federalism, in which multiple units of government exercise jurisdiction over the same geographical area. This manner of distributing political power was a compromise between two extremes feared by the framers: the efficiency of tyranny when power is overly centralized, as under the British monarchy, on one end of the spectrum, and the ineffectiveness of an overly decentralized government, as under the Articles of Confederation, on the other. Supporters of federalism believed that a division of power between federal and state governments would decrease the likelihood of tyranny. The framers felt the states were in the best position to restrict such movements. Another value of federalism is that the states are much closer to the people, so that they can be more responsive to and effective in resolving the localized concerns of the public. Federalism represented a middle ground by dividing power between the governments of the individual states and the centralized federal government.

The Constitution assigns the powers of the federal government to the legislative (Article I), executive (Article II), and judicial (Article III) branches, and the Tenth Amendment provides that those powers not expressly delegated to the federal government are reserved by the States or the people.

=== Legislative powers committed to the U.S. Congress (Article I) ===
Article I, Section 8 of the Constitution contains the enumerated powers of Congress.

==== The federal commerce power ====
Congress is authorized to "regulate commerce with foreign nations, and among the several states, and with the Indian tribes" under Article I, Section 8, Clause 3 of the Constitution.

Important early cases include United States v. E.C. Knight Co. (1895) which held that the federal Sherman Act could not be applied to manufacture of sugar because the authority of the commerce clause was insufficient to affect the manufacture of goods. Further limitation continued in cases such as Schecter Poultry v. United States, in which the Court invalidated a federal statute seeking to enforce labor conditions at a slaughterhouse for chickens; the Court held the relationship between labor conditions and chickens was too indirect – that chickens come to rest upon arrival at the slaughterhouse (thereby ending the stream of commerce), so whatever happened in the slaughterhouse was not Congress's business.

In Stafford v. Wallace, the Court articulated a "stream of commerce" test; if a transaction affected commerce in a transition that was local, but supported interstate commerce, then Congress could regulate those transactions under the commerce clause. The judgement in Stafford began the Court's increased deference to Congress in matters regarding interpretation of its powers. Further expansion of Congress's commerce clause power continued with Wickard v. Filburn in 1942 involving a farmer's refusal to comply with a federal quota. Wickard articulated the aggregation principle: that effects of the entire class matter rather than composites of the class, so even if the single farmer did not substantially affect interstate commerce, all farmers – the class to which he belonged – do – they compete with the national market. This case largely ended challenges to laws based upon the extent of power bestowed by the commerce clause until United States v. Lopez (1995).

In 1995, the Court held that the Crime Control Act of 1990, which the Gun-Free School Zones Act was a part of, was unconstitutional because it was an "impermissible extension of congressional power under the Commerce Clause." Lopez remains the central case regarding the authority of Congress under the commerce power.

==== The spending power ====
Clause 1 of Article I, § 8 grants Congress the power to levy and collect taxes provided that they are uniform across the nation. Notable cases and challenges to the power of Congress include McCray v. United States (1904), Flint v. Stone Tracy & Co. (1911), and Printz v. United States (1997).

==== Other enumerated powers ====
Other federal powers specifically enumerated by Section 8 of Article I of the United States Constitution (and generally considered exclusive to the federal government) are:

- to coin money, and to regulate its value;
- to establish laws governing bankruptcy;
- to establish post offices (although Congress may allow for the establishment of non-governmental mail services by private entities);
- to control the issuance of copyrights and patents (although copyrights and patents may also be enforced in state courts);
- to govern the District of Columbia and all other federal properties;
- to control naturalization (and, implicitly, the immigration) of aliens;
- to enforce "by appropriate legislation" the Thirteenth, Fourteenth, and Fifteenth Amendments to the United States Constitution (a function of the Constitution's Necessary and Proper clause);
- to propose, by a two-thirds vote, constitutional amendments for ratification by three-fourths of the states pursuant to the terms of Article V.

Members of the Senate and of the House of Representatives have immunity for all statements made on the floor of Congress except in cases of "Treason, Felony, or Breach of the Peace "(Art. I Sec. 6).

=== Executive powers committed to the President of the United States (Article II) ===
Article II, Section 1, vests the executive power in the President of the United States of America. Unlike the commitment of authority in Article I, which refers Congress only specifically enumerated powers "herein granted" and such powers as may be necessary and proper to carry out the same, Article II is all-inclusive in its commitment of the executive power in a President of the United States of America.

Enumerated powers of the President Several important powers are expressly committed to the President under Article II, Section 2. These include:

- Commander-in-chief of the armed forces;
- Power to pardon offenses against the United States;
- Power to make treaties (with consent of the Senate); and the
- Power to appoint judges, ambassadors, and other officers of the United States (with the advice and consent of the Senate);

The Presentment Clause (Article I, Section 7, cl. 2–3) grants the president the power to veto Congressional legislation and Congress the power to override a presidential veto with a supermajority. Under the clause, once a bill has been passed in identical form by both houses of Congress, with a two thirds majority in both houses, it becomes federal law.

The president approves or rejects a bill in its entirety; he is not permitted to veto specific provisions. In 1996, Congress passed, and President Bill Clinton signed, the Line Item Veto Act of 1996, which gave the president the power to veto individual items of budgeted expenditures in appropriations bills. The Supreme Court subsequently declared the line-item veto unconstitutional as a violation of the Presentment Clause in Clinton v. City of New York, 524 U.S. 417 (1998). The Court held that the Constitution's silence on the subject of such a procedure as "an express prohibition," and that statutes may only be enacted "in accord with a single, finely wrought and exhaustively considered, procedure", and that a bill must be approved or rejected by the president in its entirety.

==== Foreign affairs and war powers ====
Article I grants congress the power to declare war, raise, and support the armed forces of the United States, while, Article II grants the president the power of the commander-in-chief of the armed forces. The Supreme Court rarely addresses the issue of the president's use of troops, and have been dismissed on grounds that their use is a political question.

==== Appointment and removal of executive personnel ====
Article II, Section 2 grants the President the power, with the "advice and consent of the Senate," to appoint "ambassadors,... judges of the Supreme Court, and all other officers of the United States, whose appointments are not otherwise provided for" in the Constitution. This includes members of the cabinet, top-level agency officials, Article III judges, US Attorneys, and the Chairman of the Joint Chiefs, among many other positions. Under the modern interpretation of "advice and consent," a presidential appointment must be confirmed by majority vote in the Senate in order to take effect.

Article II, Section 2 gives Congress the discretion to vest the appointment of "inferior officers" in either the President alone, the heads of departments, or the lower federal courts.

The President has the authority to remove most high-level executive officers at will. Congress, however, may place limitations on the removal of certain executive appointees serving in positions where independence from the presidency is considered desirable, such as stipulating that removal may only be for cause.

Executive Immunity

Sitting presidents enjoyed immunity from civil suit for damages arising from actions taken while in office, but this rule was significantly curtailed by the Supreme Court's decision in Clinton v. Jones, which held that sitting Presidents could be sued for actions before taking office or unrelated to the discharge of executive powers.

=== Judiciary structure and jurisdiction of the federal courts (Article III) ===
Article Three of the United States Constitution vests the judicial power of the federal government in the Supreme Court. The Judiciary Act of 1789 implemented Article III by creating a hierarchy under which circuit courts consider appeals from the district courts and the Supreme Court has appellate authority over the circuit courts. The Judiciary Act of 1789 provided that the Supreme Court would consist of one chief justice and five associate justices; there have been nine justices since 1869.

=== Powers reserved to the states ===
Some of the more important powers reserved to the states by the Constitution are:

- the power, by "application of two-thirds of the legislatures of the several states," to require Congress to convene a constitutional convention for the purpose of proposing amendments to or revising the terms of the Constitution (see Article V).
- The Tenth Amendment establishes the system of dual sovereignty by reserving "the powers not delegated to the United States by the Constitution, nor prohibited by it to the States...to the States respectively, or to the people."

==== Suits against states: effect of the 11th Amendment ====
The Eleventh Amendment to the United States Constitution defines the scope of when and in what circumstances a state may be taken to federal court. Taken literally, the Amendment prohibits a citizen from suing a state in federal court through the sovereign immunity doctrine. However, the Court has articulated three exceptions: 1) Particular state officials may be sued, 2) States can waive immunity or consent to suit, and 3) Congress may authorize suits against a state through the abrogation doctrine. However, concerning this latter exception, the Supreme Court has held in Seminole Tribe v. Florida that Congress may not, outside of the Fourteenth Amendment, authorize federal lawsuits against states in abrogation of the Eleventh Amendment's guarantee of sovereign state immunity.

The United States government, its agencies and instrumentalities, are immune from state regulation that interferes with federal activities, functions, and programs. State laws and regulations cannot substantially interfere with an authorized federal program, except for minor or indirect regulation, such as state taxation of federal employees, a practice established in McCulloch v. Maryland (1819).

=== Intergovernmental immunities and interstate relations ===
The United States government, its agencies and instrumentalities, are immune from state regulation that interferes with federal activities, functions, and programs. State laws and regulations cannot substantially interfere with an authorized federal program, except for minor or indirect regulation, such as state taxation of federal employees, a practice established in McCulloch v. Maryland (1819).

== Rights of individuals ==
=== Bill of Rights ===
==== First Amendment ====
===== Freedom of expression =====
The freedom of speech has been widely controversial throughout American history, with cases such as Schenck v. United States (1919) and Brandenburg v. Ohio (1969) establishing the extent to which government can legally restrict speech. The freedom of speech does not extend to libel, but New York Times Co. v. Sullivan (1964) established a higher level of protection for the press.

===== Freedom of religion =====
In the United States, freedom of religion is a constitutionally protected right provided in the religion clauses of the First Amendment. Freedom of religion is also closely associated with separation of church and state, a concept advocated by Colonial founders such as Dr. John Clarke, Roger Williams, William Penn and later Founding Fathers such as James Madison and Thomas Jefferson.

The long-term trend has been towards increasing secularization of the government. The remaining state churches were disestablished in 1820 and teacher-led public school prayer was abolished in 1962, but the military chaplaincy remains to the present day. Notable cases include Tennessee v. Scopes, Engel v. Vitale, Abington School District v. Schempp, Georgetown College v. Jones, Lemon v. Kurtzman, Goldman v. Weinberger, County of Allegheny v. ACLU, and Rosenberger v. University of Virginia.

==== Second Amendment ====
The Second Amendment states that "a well regulated Militia, being necessary to the security of a free State, the right of the people to keep and bear Arms, shall not be infringed,". It has been one of the most controversial rights in the Bill of Rights. Notable cases include United States v. Miller (1934), Printz v. United States (1997), District of Columbia v. Heller (2008), McDonald v. City of Chicago (2010), and New York State Rifle & Pistol Ass'n v. Bruen (2022).

===== Third Amendment =====
The Third Amendment prohibits the quartering of soldiers in private residences and has never been the basis of a decision by the Supreme Court. Engblom v. Carey is the case most often mentioned involving Third Amendment claims.

==== Fourth Amendment ====
The Fourth Amendment prohibits the unreasonable search and seizure of one's effects and requires a warrant for both searches and arrests based upon probable cause. Important cases include Coolidge v. New Hampshire, Payton v. New York, United States v. Watson, Michigan v. Summers, and New York v. Harris.

==== Fifth Amendment ====
===== The Takings Clause =====
Generally speaking, the Fifth Amendment prevents the government from taking private property "for public use without just compensation." This prohibition on takings is applicable to the states via incorporation.

===== Due Process =====
The Fifth Amendment ensures that no person will be deprived of "life, liberty, or property, without due process of law" and protects oneself against self incrimination. The Miranda warning was a result of Miranda v. Arizona. Other notable cases include Michigan v. Tucker, Rhode Island v. Innis, Edwards v. Arizona, and Kuhlmann v. Wilson.

==== Sixth Amendment ====
The Sixth Amendment guarantees the right to a speedy, public trial, the power to compel witnesses, the right to counsel, and the right to an impartial jury. Cases concerning its interpretation include Baldwin v. New York, Barker v. Wingo, Crawford v. Washington, Duncan v. Louisiana, Gideon v. Wainwright, and Melendez-Diaz v. Massachusetts.

==== Seventh Amendment ====
The Seventh Amendment guarantees a jury trial in civil cases in addition to the guarantee of a jury in a criminal trial provided by the Sixth Amendment. Its guarantees are not incorporated to the states via the Fourteenth Amendment, although most state constitutions contain similar provisions. Hardware Dealers Mutual Fire Insurance Co. of Wisconsin v. Glidden Co. (1931) is the most recent significant case regarding the Amendment's interpretation.

==== Eighth Amendment ====
The Eighth Amendment prohibits the imposition of excessive bail, excessive fines, and cruel and unusual punishment. The Supreme Court declared the death penalty unconstitutional in Furman v. Georgia (1972) under the Eighth Amendment. It was later reinstated in Gregg v. Georgia. Other notable cases include Malloy v. Hogan, Witherspoon v. Illinois, and Woodson v. North Carolina.

== See also ==
- Lists of United States Supreme Court cases
- United States Supreme Court
- The Imperial Presidency
- United States Constitution
- History of the United States Constitution
