= Payton v. New York =

- Supreme Court of the United States

Argued March 26, 1979 Reargued October 9, 1979 Decided April 15, 1980
- Full case name: Theodore Payton et.al Petitoner-Plaintiff v. The State of New York et al. Defendant-Respondent
- Citations: 445 U.S. 573 (more) 100 S. Ct. 1371; 63 L. Ed. 2d 639

Holding
- The Fourth Amendment, made applicable to the States by the Fourteenth Amendment, prohibits the police from making a warrantless and nonconsensual entry into a suspect's home in order to make a routine felony arrest.

Court membership
- Chief Justice Warren E. Burger Associate Justices William J. Brennan Jr. · Potter Stewart; Byron White · Thurgood Marshall; Harry Blackmun · Lewis F. Powell Jr. William Rehnquist · John P. Stevens

Case opinions
- Majority: Stevens, joined by Brennan, Stewart, Marshall, Blackmun, Powell
- Concurrence: Blackmun
- Dissent: White, joined by Burger, Rehnquist
- Dissent: Rehnquist

Laws applied
- U.S. Const. amend. IV

Payton v. New York, 445 U.S. 573 (1980), was a United States Supreme Court case concerning warrantless entry into a private home in order to make a felony arrest. The Court struck down a New York statute providing for such warrantless entries because the Fourth Amendment draws a firm line at the entrance to the house. Absent exigent circumstances, that threshold may not be reasonably crossed without a warrant. The court, however, did specify that an arrest warrant (as opposed to a search warrant) would have sufficed for entry into the suspect's residence if there had been reason to believe that the suspect was within the home.

Payton and related case law establish that the principle that a person in a home, particularly his or her own, is entitled to Fourth Amendment protections not afforded to persons in automobiles, as per Whren v. United States, or to persons in public, as per United States v. Watson.

== Background ==
=== Theodore Payton ===
On January 14, 1970, police in New York had gathered enough evidence to establish probable cause that Theodore Payton murdered a gas station manager. Before acquiring an arrest warrant, officers arrived at Payton's apartment the next morning with the intention of arresting him. The police believed someone was inside, but there was no answer when the officers knocked on the door. The officers gained access to Payton's apartment using a crowbar. Although Payton was not home, police still seized a .30-caliber shell casing that was in plain view. Eventually, Payton later surrendered to police custody and was indicted for murder, with the .30-caliber shell casing having been admitted as evidence against him. Payton moved to have the shell casing suppressed, but the trial judge deemed it admissible. Supporting this determination, the judge cited the New York Code of Criminal Procedure as authorizing the warrantless entry into Payton's residence and the plain view doctrine as authorizing the seizure of the shell casing.

=== Obie Riddick ===
In June 1973, Obie Riddick was identified by victims of an armed robbery that occurred two years prior. About a year later, police learned of Riddick's address in Queens. On March 14, 1974, law enforcement officers, without acquiring an arrest warrant, knocked on the door of Riddick's home. Riddick's three-year-old son answered the door and police saw Riddick sitting inside the home, at which point they entered and arrested him. In the course of his arrest, police searched the area surrounding Riddick and discovered narcotics. Riddick was later indicted on the narcotics charge and moved to suppress the evidence against him, but the trial judge deemed the evidence admissible. Supporting this determination, the judge cited the revised New York statute as authorizing the warrantless entry into Riddick's residence and Chimel v. California, 395 U.S. 752 (1969), as authorizing the warrantless search of Riddick's immediate area incident to arrest.

=== Consolidation of Cases ===
On appeal to the New York Court of Appeals, the two cases were consolidated, and the convictions of both defendants were affirmed. The New York Court of Appeals reasoned that not only were the actions of law enforcement authorized by the statutes, but also that the privacy interests involved in a warrantless entry into the home for the purpose of arrest are significantly less than if the purpose were to conduct a warrantless search.

== Decision ==
On April 15, 1980, the Supreme Court of the United States issued a 6-3 decision in favor of defendants Payton and Riddick and finally answered the constitutional question that had yet to be settled: "whether and under what circumstances may an officer enter a suspect's home to make a warrantless arrest." This issue was expressly left open by prior Supreme Court cases such as United States v. Watson, 423 U.S. 411 (1976), which addressed warrantless arrests made in public, and United States v. Santana, 427 U.S. 38 (1976), which addressed warrantless arrests made in private homes when exigent circumstances exist.

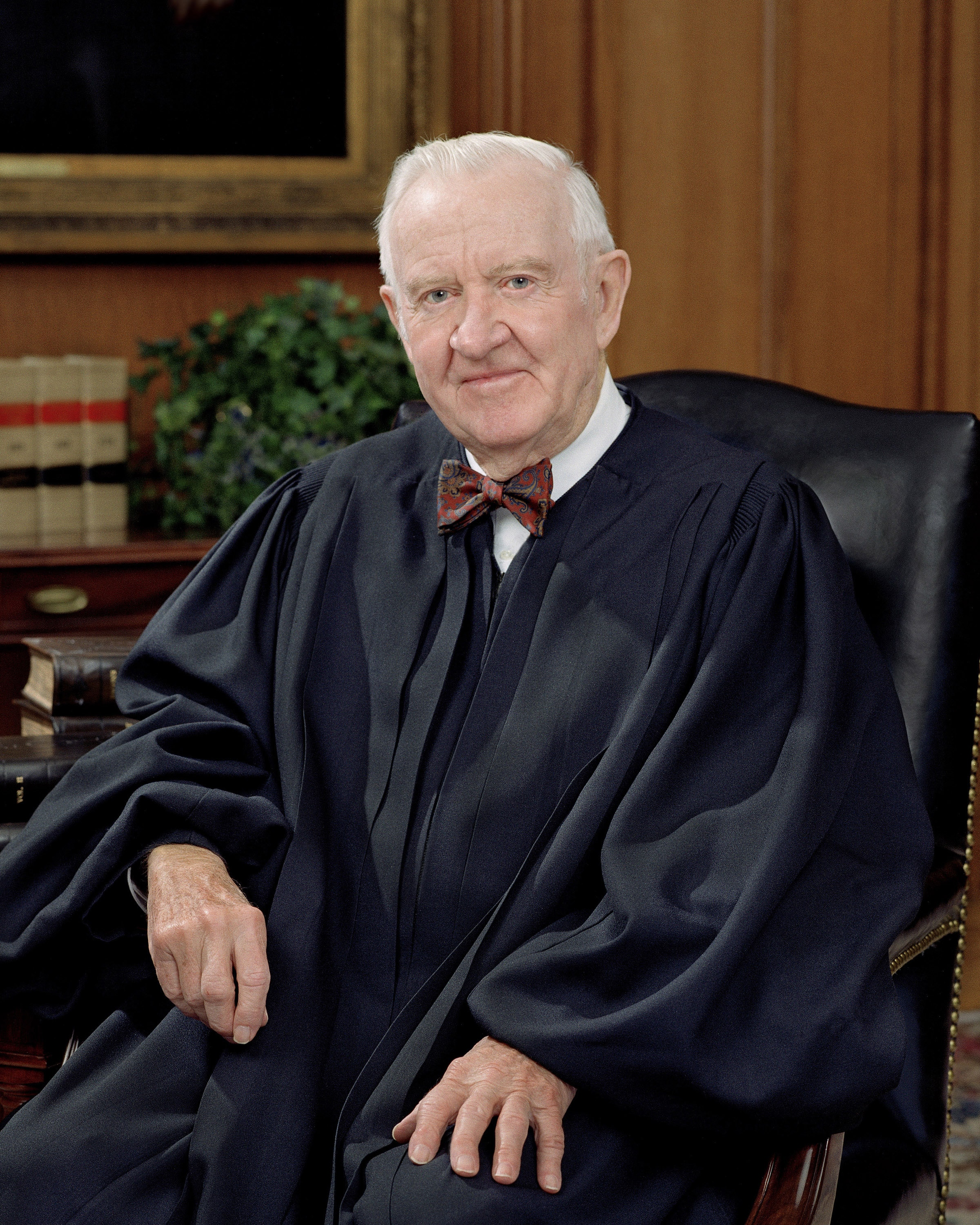
Justice John Paul Stevens, the author of the Supreme Court's majority opinion

=== Opinion of the Court ===
Justice John Paul Stevens authored the Court's majority opinion and was joined by five other justices. The Court began by emphasizing the issues that were not present in this case. The court stated that exigent circumstances were not implicated because the New York courts treated the case as "involving routine arrests in which there was ample time to obtain a warrant." Additionally, the court clarified that the holding of this case was limited to warrantless entry's into the suspect's home, not a third party's.

After first establishing that the Fourth Amendment protects against unreasonable searches and seizures, the Court explained the importance of warrants in minimizing the risk of such a search or seizure being found unreasonable. The Court explained that, since the arrest of a person constitutes a seizure, and the Fourth Amendment applies equally to the seizure of people and property, their decision would be guided by established rules from Fourth Amendment case law involving property.

Next, the Court recognized the well-established principle of the Fourth Amendment that warrantless searches and seizures inside the home are presumptively unreasonable. However, the Court noted that this same principle does not apply to warrantless searches and seizures in public or when the property is in plain view, since no invasion of the owner's privacy is required to see it. The Court argued that these rules guiding searches and seizures of property inside the home must be extended to protect against warrantless seizure of persons inside the home as well, if the privacy interests of the home are to be preserved. The Court disagreed with the New York Court of Appeals' position that the intrusiveness of entering a suspect's home to search for property is significantly higher than searching for a person because both "share this fundamental characteristic: the breach of the entrance to an individual's home."

Highlighting that the Fourth Amendment applies "equally to seizures of property and to seizures of persons" and unambiguously defines the "right of the people to be secure in their . . . houses," the Court concluded that the Fourth Amendment has drawn a fine line at the entrance to the house" that is not to be crossed unless a warrant has been issued or exigent circumstances authorize the warrantless search.

The Court then turned its attention to discussing why the rationales that supported the Court's holding in United States v. Watson did not govern this case. First, the Court addressed whether any common-law rules support police entering private homes to arrest without a warrant based on their suspicion that the person has committed a felony. The Court found that not only were the views of common-law commentators polarized on the subject, but that there was also never any clear, unambiguous rule established, like the one that supported the Court's holding in United States v. Watson. Next, the Court found that, unlike in United States v. Watson, there was no clear consensus among the states that permit warrantless entries into private homes to arrest. In fact, the Court noted that the number of states permitting this practice was declining and was not fully representative of the true statistics, as seven states have held warrantless home arrests violate their state constitutions and never reached the issue as it relates to the Fourth Amendment, leaving their decision immunized from Supreme Court review. Finally, the Court pointed out that Congress has never explicitly stated that a warrantless arrest in a private home is reasonable, as it had for warrantless arrests in public. Therefore, the Court concluded that the rationales supporting the holding in United States v. Watson were wholly inapplicable to this case.

For the aforementioned reasons, the Court reversed the convictions of Payton and Riddick and held that, unless exigent circumstances exist, warrantless entry into a suspect's home to carry out a routine felony arrest is unreasonable and, therefore, violates the Fourth Amendment.

=== Concurrence ===
Justice Harry A. Blackmun authored a brief concurring opinion in which he stressed that the Court's holding in United States v. Watson was still correct, but that the balancing of governmental and individual interests in this case requires stronger protections when the warrantless arrest is made in the suspect's home as opposed to a public arrest.

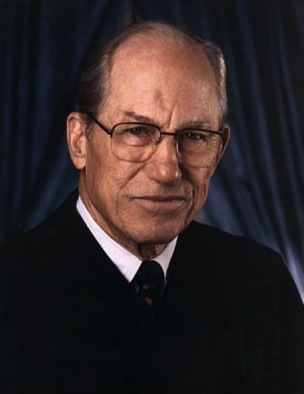
Justice Byron R. White, the author of the dissenting opinion

=== Dissent ===
Justice Byron R. White, joined by Chief Justice Warren E. Burger and Justice William H. Rehnquist, authored a dissenting opinion. Justice White argued that the Court's holding was neither supported by the common law or the Fourth Amendment's history. Additionally, the Court's new rule limits law enforcement's effectiveness and works contrary to the four restrictions that were established by common law for warrantless home arrests: (1) the offense committed was a felony, (2) the police knocked and announced their presence, (3) the entry had to occur during the day, and (4) there was probable cause to believe the suspect committed the crime and was inside the home. Justice White believed these protections already safeguarded the defendants' interests in this case and that the Court's new rule was both unfounded and unnecessary.

Finally, Justice Rehnquist authored a separate, brief dissent in which he questioned the effectiveness of a criminal justice system that allows convictions upheld on appeal to be set aside by the exclusionary rule when, as the Court characterized them, the arrests were "routine."

== Subsequent developments ==
In Steagald v. United States, 451 U.S. 204 (1981), the United States Supreme Court addressed whether a valid arrest warrant for a suspect authorizes police to search a third party's residence for that suspect. The Court held that, in the absence of exigent circumstances or consent, a search warrant is required to enter the home of a third party, even when the object of the search is the subject of a valid arrest warrant. The Court reasoned that, although a valid arrest warrant was issued, that warrant was intended to protect the interests of the person being seized—not the privacy interests associated with the search of a third party's home.

In Minnesota v. Olson, 495 U.S. 91 (1990), the United States Supreme Court answered the constitutional question that had been intentionally left open in Payton v. New York: whether the rule prohibiting police from entering a suspect's home without an arrest warrant applies equally to overnight guests. The Court held that overnight guests have a reasonable expectation of privacy in the third party's home and are therefore entitled to the same protections against warrantless entries into a home for arrest as homeowners. The Court reasoned that since police had the home surrounded, there was ample time to obtain a warrant and no exigent circumstances to support a warrantless entry.

== See also ==
- List of United States Supreme Court cases, volume 445
- Miller v. United States, 357 U.S. 301 (1958)
- Ker v. California, 374 U.S. 23 (1963)
