= New York v. Harris =

- Supreme Court of the United States

Argued January 10, 1990 Decided April 18, 1990
- Full case name: New York v. Harris
- Docket no.: 88-1000
- Citations: 495 U.S. 14 (more)
- Argument: Oral argument
- Opinion announcement: Opinion announcement

Court membership
- Chief Justice William Rehnquist Associate Justices William J. Brennan Jr. · Byron White; Thurgood Marshall · Harry Blackmun; John P. Stevens · Sandra Day O'Connor; Antonin Scalia · Anthony Kennedy

Case opinions
- Majority: White, joined by Rehnquist, O'Connor, Scalia, Kennedy
- Dissent: Marshall, joined by Brennan, Blackmun, Stevens

New York v. Harris, 495 U.S. 14 (1990), is a U.S. Supreme Court case that addressed whether a confession obtained at a police station is admissible when the arrest was made illegally inside the suspect's home without a warrant—violating Payton v. New York. Bernard Harris was arrested in his apartment without a warrant (though police had probable cause for the murder of Thelma Staton). When police entered his apartment, Harris was read his Miranda Rights and he answered questions there. He was then taken to the police station, where he gave a written confession that was later used to convict him. The court ruled 5-4 that the confession was admissible because it was made outside of the home after Miranda rights warnings, and was not protected by Payton. The ruling narrowed the exclusionary rule, which prevents use of evidence obtained through unconstitutional means.
