= House guest =

Person who temporarily resides in another domicile

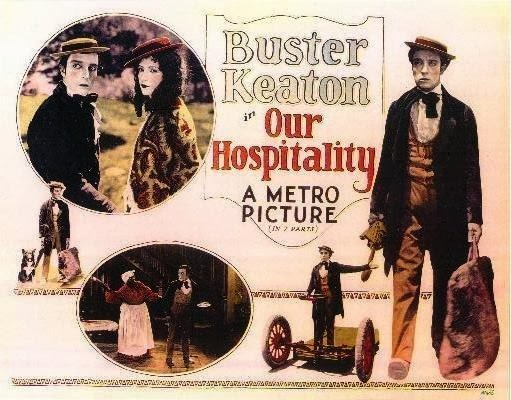
The 1923 Buster Keaton film Our Hospitality features the protagonist using his status as a house guest to forestall the ill intentions of members of the host family.

A house guest or overnight guest is a person who is staying as a guest in the house of another person. The presence of a person as a house guest raises cultural and legal considerations, placing the owner of the house in the position of host, with expectations of providing hospitality and seeing to the comfort and protection of the guest. The guest, similarly, assumes social obligations with respect to their treatment of the host and the host's property.

== Social status ==
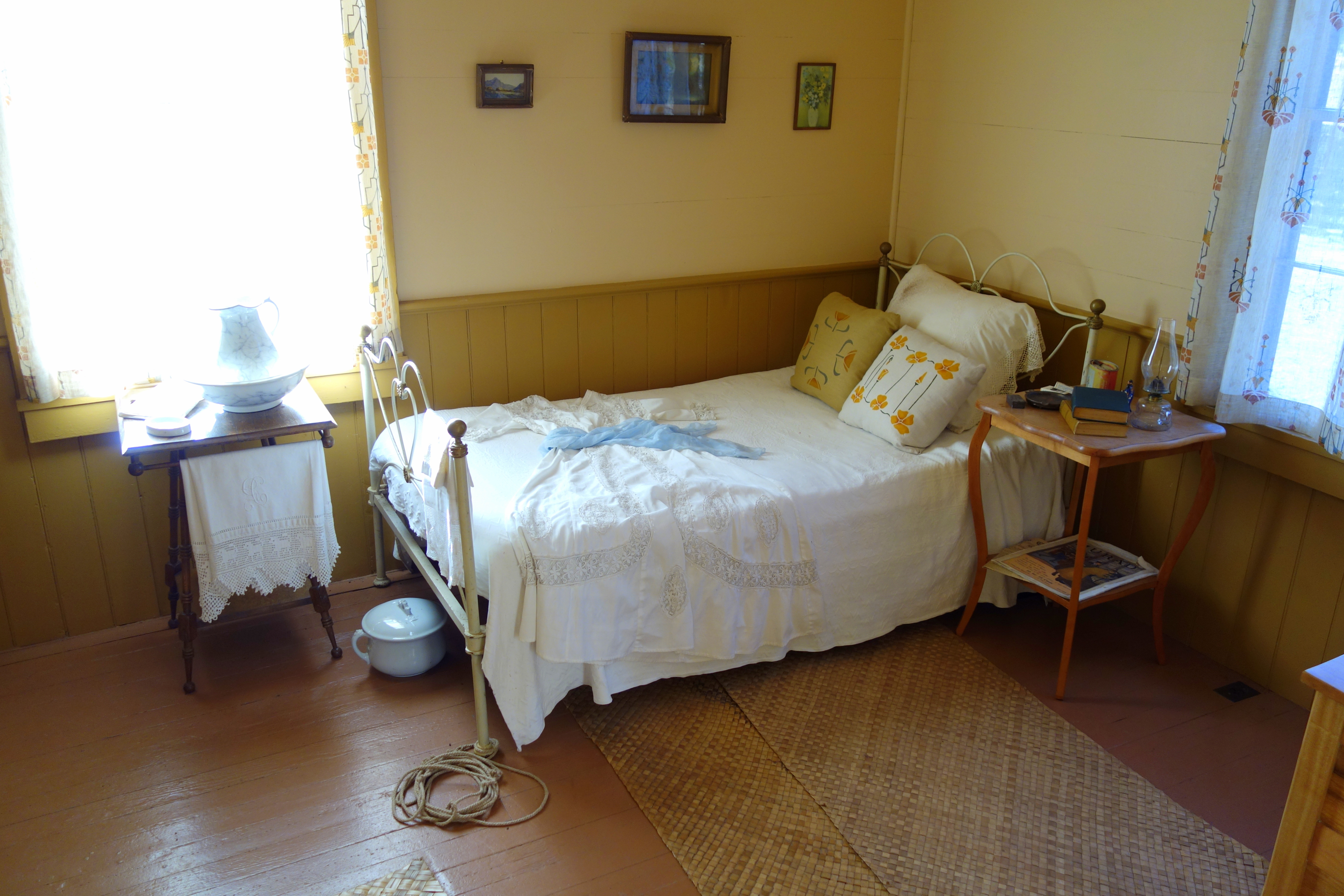
Guest bedroom at the home of 19th century writer Jack London, for accommodating a house guest.

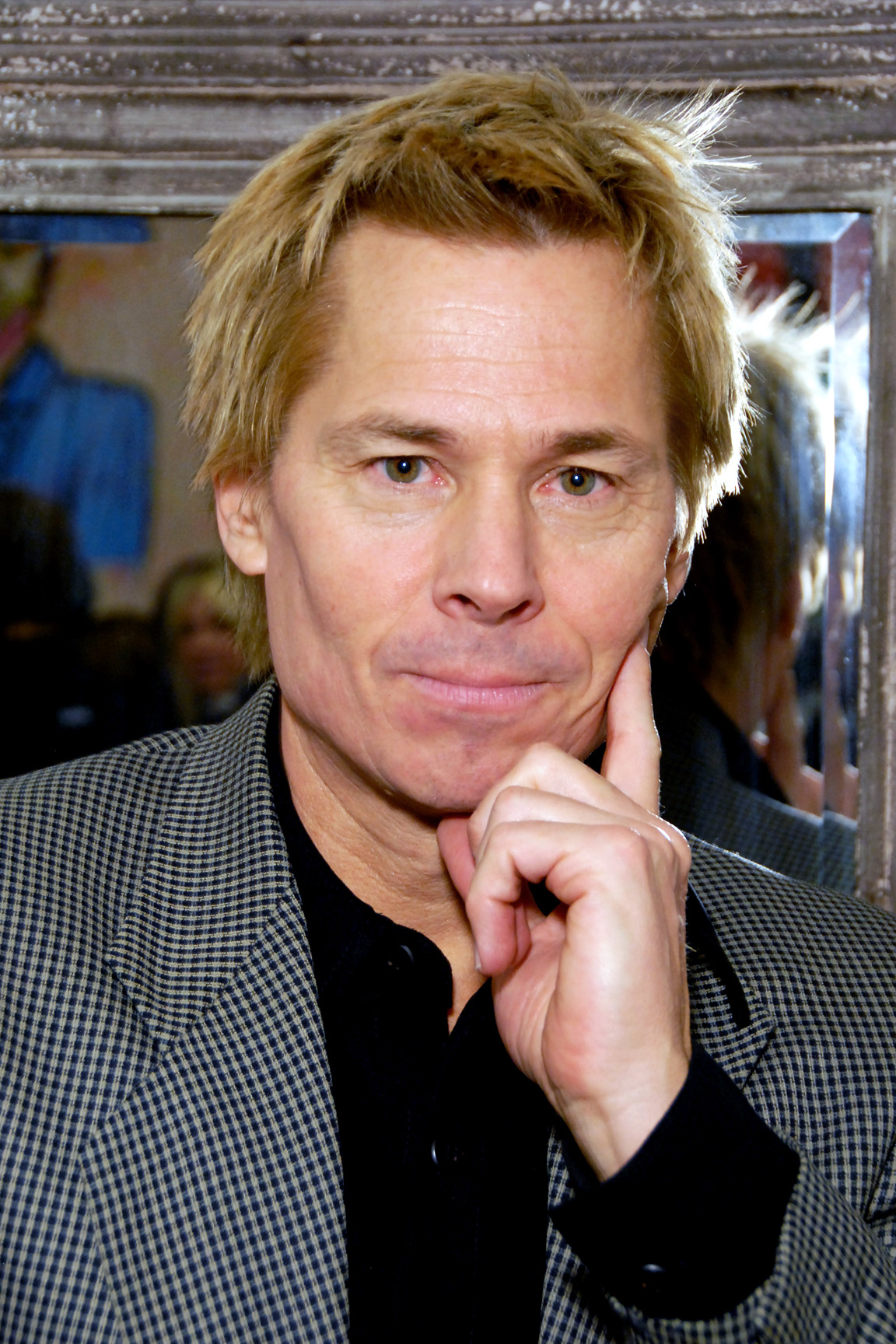
Kato Kaelin, famous house guest of O. J. Simpson

Although any person who visits the home of another may be considered a "guest", even if their visit is only for a few minutes, the term "house guest" is generally understood to apply to "a person who stays overnight in another person's home".

Since ancient times, hospitality has involved welcoming the stranger and offering him food, shelter, and safety. In many cultures, a particular standard of care is expected of a host who has agreed to allow a person to be their guest, and a particular standard of conduct is expected of a person who is a guest in the home of another:

A guest is an outsider who has been ritually "domesticated", made temporarily part of the host's domus, or house. He is given food, offered gestures of affability, and sometimes presented with gifts on his departure—for he must be free to leave. There may be genuine interest in him and delight in his company. But underlying the performance is the formal of "disarming" him, of forestalling any likelihood of violence or resentment.

The Abrahamic religions — Christianity, Islam and Judaism — afford special status to the showing of hospitality toward guests, with emphasis on the treatment of strangers and travelers. Similarly, Buddhist teachings instruct adherents to treat a guest "as a god" (Note: See Atithi Devo Bhava) with a division between planned giving, and unplanned giving, such as inviting in and showing generosity to a wanderer. In the enlightenment tradition, those such as Immanuel Kant saw hospitality as a natural right entitled to guests, albeit for a limited amount of time.

Describing the hospitality shown to European house guests in the Solomon Islands, cultural writer Margaret Visser notes:

No matter how "ungrateful" the inhabitants seemed to their European visitors, according to early ethnographical reports, they were nearly always credited with generosity when they were allowed the role of hosts: they were at home, giving, while the foreign adventurers accepted the role of guests, away, receiving. For ritually speaking, the host is always the powerful one in relation to the guest. The guest is treated well on that very account, so that the host can show his magnanimity, his self-control, and his authority over the others in his group.

Visser further notes that complementary to the social obligations of the host of a house guest are the obligations of the guest, writing that "the other side of the same coin that is hospitality is the fear that can accompany the arrival of another, especially of an unknown other, inside one's own house".

That person must be turned into a guest, given a guest's role, with the rules attendant upon it: accept your host's attentions, be seen to receive them passively and admiringly, and do not attempt to advise your host, order his family about, or criticize him. Look pleased by his kindness. And finally, show yourself disposed to invite your host back one day: you shall then be the host and he the guest.

Another author suggests "four excellent rules for being a welcome house guest":

1. Participate in the events planned for your visit. Show your interest in and be appreciative for the activities your hosts have planned for you. Be sure to take clothes versatile enough for a variety of activities.
2. In general, keep the schedule of the family you are visiting (e.g., go to your room when they go to bed, be ready to eat when meals are served, etc.).
3. Take care of the hosts' property. For example, rinse out the tub after your bath, pick up the papers after reading them, and return your empty drink glasses to the kitchen.
4. Send a thank-you note after the visit. Be sure to mention some specific things you enjoyed.

The expected relationship between house guest and host varies by culture. For example, it has been asserted that house guests in France "have limited access to various areas in their host's house. If they need an extra towel, for example, they ask their host or hostess to get it for them rather than rooting through cupboards to find one", whereas house guests in the United States are expected "to help themselves—within reason—to what they need from kitchen and bathroom cabinets or the refrigerator". In some cultures, guests may feel free to give their host a gift to show their gratitude for being hosted, but in others, such as that of the Ila people of Zambia, giving any kind of gift to the host may be socially disapproved, as it may be interpreted as payment, suggesting that the hospitality was for sale rather than an act of generosity of the host.

House guests may also come to "overstay their welcome", leading to an old proverb often attributed to Benjamin Franklin, but historically preceding him, that "fish and visitors stink in three days". It has also been noted that "being a house guest is odd in itself" because it exposes the guest to the idiosyncrasies of the host's household. Every household being unique in some way, the host may have "their own way of doing things, ways that are so familiar to them and so calcified within the relative standards of their own family that the inherent weirdness doesn't even occur to them". The word, "guest" originally referred to a visitor to a home, and was later broadened to include persons staying in hotels and similar accommodations. In the mid-2000s it was noted that other kinds of businesses, from restaurants to retail stores, have begun referring to customers as "guests".

== Legal status ==
Old English law defined a guest as "a traveler who lodges at an inn or tavern with the consent of the keeper".

In some legal jurisdictions, particular rights are afforded to persons meeting a statutory or common law definition of a house guest. The Supreme Court of the United States has recognized that a house guest is entitled to an expectation of privacy, writing in Minnesota v. Olson:

To hold that an overnight guest has a legitimate expectation of privacy in his host's home merely recognizes the everyday expectations of privacy that we all share. Staying overnight in another's home is a longstanding social custom that serves functions recognized as valuable by society. We stay in others' homes when we travel to a strange city for business or pleasure, when we visit our parents, children, or more distant relatives out of town, when we are in between jobs or homes, or when we house-sit for a friend. We will all be hosts and we will all be guests many times in our lives. From either perspective, we think that society recognizes that a houseguest has a legitimate expectation of privacy in his host's home.

From the overnight guest's perspective, he seeks shelter in another's home precisely because it provides him with privacy, a place where he and his possessions will not be disturbed by anyone but his host and those his host allows inside. We are at our most vulnerable when we are asleep because we cannot monitor our own safety or the security of our belongings. It is for this reason that, although we may spend all day in public places, when we cannot sleep in our own home we seek out another private place to sleep, whether it be a hotel room, or the home of a friend. ...

That the guest has a host who has ultimate control of the house is not inconsistent with the guest having a legitimate expectation of privacy. The houseguest is there with the permission of his host, who is willing to share his house and his privacy with his guest. It is unlikely that the guest will be confined to a restricted area of the house; and when the host is away or asleep, the guest will have a measure of control over the premises. The host may admit or exclude from the house as he prefers, but it is unlikely that he will admit someone who wants to see or meet with the guest over the objection of the guest. On the other hand, few houseguests will invite others to visit them while they are guests without consulting their hosts; but the latter, who have the authority to exclude despite the wishes of the guest, will often be accommodating. The point is that hosts will more likely than not respect the privacy interests of their guests, who are entitled to a legitimate expectation of privacy despite the fact that they have no legal interest in the premises and do not have the legal authority to determine who may or may not enter the household.

== See also ==
- Guest house
