= Florida v. Wells =

- Supreme Court of the United States

Argued December 4, 1989 Decided April 18, 1990
- Full case name: Florida v. Wells
- Docket no.: 88-1835
- Citations: 495 U.S. 1 (more)
- Argument: Oral argument
- Opinion announcement: Opinion announcement

Case history
- Prior: 539 So. 2d 464 (Fla. S. Ct. 1989); cert. granted

Holding
- A state police department may grant discretion regarding the opening of closed containers to officers conducting an inventory search in accordance with a standard procedure.

Court membership
- Chief Justice William Rehnquist Associate Justices William J. Brennan Jr. · Byron White; Thurgood Marshall · Harry Blackmun; John P. Stevens · Sandra Day O'Connor; Antonin Scalia · Anthony Kennedy

Case opinions
- Majority: Rehnquist, joined by White, O'Connor, Scalia, Kennedy
- Concurrence: Brennan, joined by Marshall
- Concurrence: Blackmun
- Concurrence: Stevens

Laws applied
- U.S. Const. amend. IV

Florida v. Wells, 495 U.S. 1 (1990), was a United States Supreme Court case in which the Court held that it would not be a violation of the Fourth Amendment for state police departments to allow officers conducting an inventory search discretion in which closed containers they choose to open.

== Background ==
In 1985, Martin Wells was pulled over for speeding by Florida state police. After the officer smelled alcohol on his breath, he was arrested for driving under the influence and subsequently agreed to a breathalyzer test.

Following arrest his car was impounded, which resulted in an inventory search being done. During the search, two marijuana cigarette butts as well as a suitcase were discovered. The arresting officer chose to force open the suitcase, at which point a bag containing a large amount of marijuana was found. Wells was later charged with possession of a controlled substance.

At trial, Wells filed a motion to suppress the evidence seized during the search on the grounds that the seizure violated the Fourth Amendment. The motion was denied.

Upon appeal, the Florida Fifth District Court of Appeal ruled that the search of the closed suitcase violated the Fourth Amendment.

The Supreme Court of Florida affirmed, relying on Colorado v. Bertine, which it understood to allow admission of evidence found within a closed container only when the searching officer follows a standard police procedure mandating the opening of such containers within every impounded vehicle. Because no such policy existed, the court found the search and therefore the discovered evidence to be invalid.

Additionally, the court's opinion stated "The police under Bertine must mandate either that all containers will be opened during an inventory search, or that no containers will be opened. There can be no room for discretion."

== Holding ==
The Supreme Court affirmed on appeal, agreeing that no policy regarding the opening of closed containers existed and therefore that the suppression of evidence was proper. However, it disagreed with the notion that a valid policy must restrict officers to searching either all or none of the closed containers discovered during the search.

Our view that standardized criteria ... must regulate the opening of containers found during inventory searches is based on the principle that an inventory search must not be a ruse for a general rummaging in order to discover incriminating evidence. The policy or practice governing inventory searches should be designed to produce an inventory.

Rather, the Court stated that a policy may allow officers to determine whether a container should be opened based on the nature of the search and the characteristics of the container. For example, if a policy allowed officers to open a container it would not be improper for the searching officer to refrain from opening a container whose contents are visible from the exterior.

=== Brennan's Concurrence ===
Brennan, who had previously dissented in Bertine, agreed with the Court's conclusion that the evidence was invalid, and further argued that the search was intentionally designed to locate evidence rather than produce a useful inventory. However, he disagreed with the idea that a state's policy may grant officers some discretion in whether to open a container, considering the ruling to have misrepresented the Court's reasoning in Bertine.

=== Blackmun's Concurrence ===
In Blackmun's concurrence, he agreed that a State could reasonably adopt a policy mandating the search of some containers but not others based on specified criteria. However, he rejected the majority's ruling that an individual officer could be authorized to exercise discretion while performing a search.

The exercise of discretion by an individual officer, especially when it cannot be measured against objective, standard criteria, creates the potential for abuse of Fourth Amendment rights our earlier inventory-search cases were designed to guard against.

Instead, he believed that the Court should not have addressed the issue at all, considering it to be a different constitutional question.

=== Stevens' Concurrence ===
Stevens agreed with Blackmun in his concurrence, but further criticized the Court for granting certiorari merely to correct a minor error in the lower court's reasoning and to extend the power of state officers.
