= List of United States Supreme Court cases, volume 445 =

This is a list of all the United States Supreme Court cases from volume 445 of the United States Reports:

Case name	Citation	Date decided
Whirlpool Corp. v. Marshall	445 U.S. 1	1980
United States v. Clark	445 U.S. 23	1980
Massachusetts v. Meehan	445 U.S. 39	1980
Trammel v. United States	445 U.S. 40	1980
Lewis v. United States (1980)	445 U.S. 55	1980
Bloomer v. Liberty Mut. Ins. Co.	445 U.S. 74	1980
California Retail Liquor Dealers Assn. v. Midcal Aluminum, Inc.	445 U.S. 97	1980
United States v. Apfelbaum	445 U.S. 115	1980
Kissinger v. Reporters Committee for Freedom of Press	445 U.S. 136	1980
Forsham v. Harris	445 U.S. 169	1980
Crown Simpson Pulp Co. v. Costle	445 U.S. 193	1980
Costle v. Pacific Legal Foundation	445 U.S. 198	1980
Chiarella v. United States	445 U.S. 222	1980
United States v. Clarke	445 U.S. 253	1980
Rummel v. Estelle	445 U.S. 263	1980
Vance v. Universal Amusement Co.	445 U.S. 308	1980
Deposit Guaranty Nat. Bank v. Roper	445 U.S. 326	1980
United States v. Gillock	445 U.S. 360	1980
GTE Sylvania, Inc. v. Consumers Union of United States, Inc.	445 U.S. 375	1980
United States Parole Comm'n v. Geraghty	445 U.S. 388	1980
Mobil Oil Corp. v. Commissioner of Taxes of Vt.	445 U.S. 425	1980
United States v. Crews	445 U.S. 463	1980
Vitek v. Jones	445 U.S. 480	1980
Branti v. Finkel	445 U.S. 507	1980
United States v. Mitchell (1980)	445 U.S. 535	1980
Roberts v. United States	445 U.S. 552	1980
Payton v. New York	445 U.S. 573	1980
Owen v. Independence	445 U.S. 622	1980
Whalen v. United States	445 U.S. 684	1980
Andrus v. Idaho	445 U.S. 715	1980
California v. Velasquez	445 U.S. 1301	1980
