= Colorado v. Spring =

- Supreme Court of the United States

Argued December 9, 1986 Decided January 27, 1987
- Full case name: Colorado v. Spring
- Citations: 479 U.S. 564 (more) 107 S. Ct. 851; 93 L. Ed. 2d 954

Case history
- Prior: Conviction reversed by Colo Ct App., 671 P.2d 965, 966 (1983), and decision affirmed upon further appeal by Colo Sp Ct, 713 P.2d 865 (1985).

Holding
- A suspect's awareness of which crime law enforcement is interrogating him about is not relevant in determining the validity of his waiver of Fifth Amendment rights.

Court membership
- Chief Justice William Rehnquist Associate Justices William J. Brennan Jr. · Byron White; Thurgood Marshall · Harry Blackmun; Lewis F. Powell Jr. · John P. Stevens; Sandra Day O'Connor · Antonin Scalia

Case opinions
- Majority: Powell, joined by Rehnquist, White, Blackmun, Stevens, O'Connor, Scalia
- Dissent: Marshall, joined by Brennan

Laws applied
- U.S. Const. amend. V

Colorado v. Spring, 479 U.S. 564 (1987), was a United States Supreme Court case in which the Court held that a suspect's awareness of the crimes about which he may be questioned is not relevant to his waiver of his Fifth Amendment rights.

== Background ==
While on vacation in Colorado, a man named John Leroy Spring purportedly murdered one Donald Walker in February 1979. There was supposedly an anonymous accomplice who assisted Spring, but no such person was ever apprehended in the investigation of Walker's death. An informant, whose identity was concealed, tipped off agents in the Bureau of Alcohol, Tobacco, Firearms and Explosives (ATF) as to Spring's alleged involvement in the illegal interstate transportation of ill-gotten firearms. The agents also learned that John Spring talked with an unknown party about the Walker homicide and the role he played in it.

Working off the information provided by the informant, ATF agents planned out a sting operation to arrest Spring on 30 March. Their goal came to fruition, as Spring was successfully caught and arrested in Kansas City, Missouri, for the crime of the illegal distribution of stolen firearms. They hoped this arrest would provide a launching pad from which to judge him as a suspect in the investigation of the Walker homicide.

As required by Miranda v. Arizona, Spring was advised of his fifth amendment rights to protection against self-incrimination, an attorney, and silence when interrogated. Spring was actually reminded twice of his rights: first on the scene of the arrest, then again back at the ATF office in Kansas City. However, Spring opted to waive them through written signature. He then voluntarily made a statement and answered questions regarding the ongoing investigation surrounding his involvement in illegal interstate firearms trafficking.

The ATF agents began the interrogation by asking Spring to elaborate on the firearms transactions that directly led to his arrest, so as not to give away that they planned on eventually questioning about the death of Walker. From there, the agents progressed to the topic of whether or not he had a prior a criminal record. When Spring admitted he shot his aunt at age ten, the agents saw an opportunity. Given Spring had just confessed to shooting someone as close to him as a family member, they questioned whether or not there were other victims. In response, Spring lowered his head and simply uttered the phrase, “I shot another guy once,” without specifically naming or describing the man who he fired upon. The agents pressed further, first asking if he ever visited the state of Colorado in the past, and if the man he claimed to have shot was named Donald Walker. They also questioned if he used a snowbank to hide Walker's corpse, in the case that he did murder the man. Spring responded to both questions with a “no,” and the interview ended at this point.

Nearly two months later, on May 26, 1979, Spring, after having once again waived his Miranda rights through written signature, verbally confessed to the Colorado murder to Colorado law enforcement officers. He then signed a formal statement which bound him to this confession, a confession that would ultimately seal his fate for better or worse.

== Trial ==
When charged with first-degree murder in a Colorado state court, however, Spring and his attorney did not sit idly by. Instead, they moved quickly to nullify the statements made by Spring on May 26 and March 30; the basis of their argument was that the interrogating agents violated his due process rights as decreed by Miranda v. Arizona. Spring and his defending attorney emphasized that, as he was not notified prior to interrogation that he would be questioned about the killing of Donald Walker, the ATF agents pushed him to incriminate himself.

The trial court insisted that this statement be deemed inadmissible not because of the failure by the ATF agents to notify Spring of the focus of the interrogation, but because his statement that he “shot another guy once” was irrelevant, and that the context of the discussion did not point to his aforementioned confession being about his participation in the Walker homicide. However, the court held that the May 26th statement, as it was made freely, voluntarily, and intelligently, should be admitted as evidence, thus convicting Spring of the first-degree murder of Donald Walker.

This holding was reversed by the Colorado Court of Appeals, who sided with the argument proposed by Spring's legal team that the failure on part of the ATF agents to inform Spring of the topic of questioning prior to the interrogation should invalidate the March 30th statement. The court also argued that the State of Colorado failed to substantially prove that the May 26th statement was not the illegal “fruit” of the March 30th statement; this doctrine of “fruit of the poisonous tree” holds that if any evidence is collected through illegal means, like entering a house without a (proper) search warrant, then such evidence must not be admitted into trial. This holds true even for an interrogation; if tactics used in an interrogation are illegal, or if the interrogation itself is illegally performed, then it, along with any physical evidence it produces, may be excluded from trial. The Colorado Supreme Court affirmed the holding made by the Court of Appeals, once again saying the murder confession made on May 26 was the illegal “fruit” of the March 30th statement.

The Supreme Court of the United States, in the Spring decision, reversed the rulings of both the Colorado Supreme Court and the Colorado Court of Appeals. By a vote of seven to two, the Supreme Court held that the interrogating officers’ failure to notify the suspect that they would question him about the Walker murder did not impact, and thus invalidate, his waiver of his Miranda rights. Delivering the majority opinion, Associate Justice Lewis F. Powell, Jr. stated that the Court's only focus of inquiry was the March 30th statement, as it was the illegality of this statement that supposedly marred the May 26th statement.
