= Reporters Committee for Freedom of the Press =

U.S. nonprofit organization

The Reporters Committee for Freedom of the Press
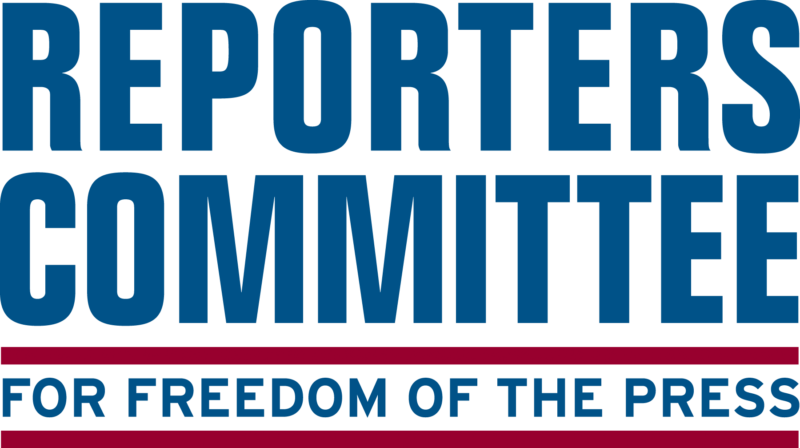
- Abbreviation: RCFP
- Formation: 1970; 56 years ago
- Type: Non-Profit
- Purpose: First Amendment, free press advocacy
- Location: Washington, D.C.
- Executive Director: Bruce D. Brown
- Website: rcfp.org

The Reporters Committee for Freedom of the Press (RCFP) is a nonprofit organization based in Washington, D.C., that provides pro bono legal services and resources to and on behalf of journalists. The organization pursues litigation, offers direct representation, submits amicus curiae briefs, and provides other legal assistance on matters involving the First Amendment, press freedom, freedom of information, and court access issues.

== History ==
The Reporters Committee was formed in 1970 after New York Times reporter Earl Caldwell was ordered to reveal his sources within the Black Panthers. This led to a meeting among journalists—including J. Anthony Lukas, Murray Fromson, Fred Graham, Jack Nelson, Robert Maynard, Ben Bradlee, Tom Wicker, and Mike Wallace, among others—to discuss the need to provide legal assistance and resources to protect journalists' First Amendment rights. The journalists in attendance formed a part-time committee dedicated to this issue, and they eventually garnered enough support from foundations and news organizations to build a staff and recruit attorneys willing to volunteer their services.

Jack Landau, the Reporters Committee's first executive director, implemented many of the legal defense projects that are central to the organization today. He started the legal defense hotline for journalists seeking guidance on free press and information issues, the first magazine for the press devoted to news media law developments, and the first service center offering free help to the press on accessing federal and state public records.

In the early years after its founding, the Reporters Committee was a plaintiff in several early test-case lawsuits, including efforts to seek access to 41 million of President Richard Nixon's White House documents and tapes, as well as former Secretary of State Henry Kissinger's official telephone transcripts. Other lawsuits sought access to FBI arrest records, and to block telephone companies from giving secret access to media telephone records.

In 1985, Jane E. Kirtley replaced Landau as executive director. One of Kirtley's top priorities was ensuring journalists had access to knowledge of reliable legal resources. Under her direction, the Reporters Committee created the 'Open Government Guide', an online resource that reviews the open records and open meetings laws in every state and Washington, D.C. The guide includes expert commentary from attorneys who are familiar with the provisions of their state's code, as well as court rulings and informal practices that affect the public's ability to obtain copies of public documents and attend government meetings. 'Agents of Discovery' a series of installments reporting on subpoenas served to the news media, was another of Kirtley's major projects. Kirtley also led the Reporters Committee's efforts to produce 'The First Amendment Handbook', a tool that provides basic information about media law for reporters and newsrooms and helped launch a fellowship program for the next generation of media attorneys.

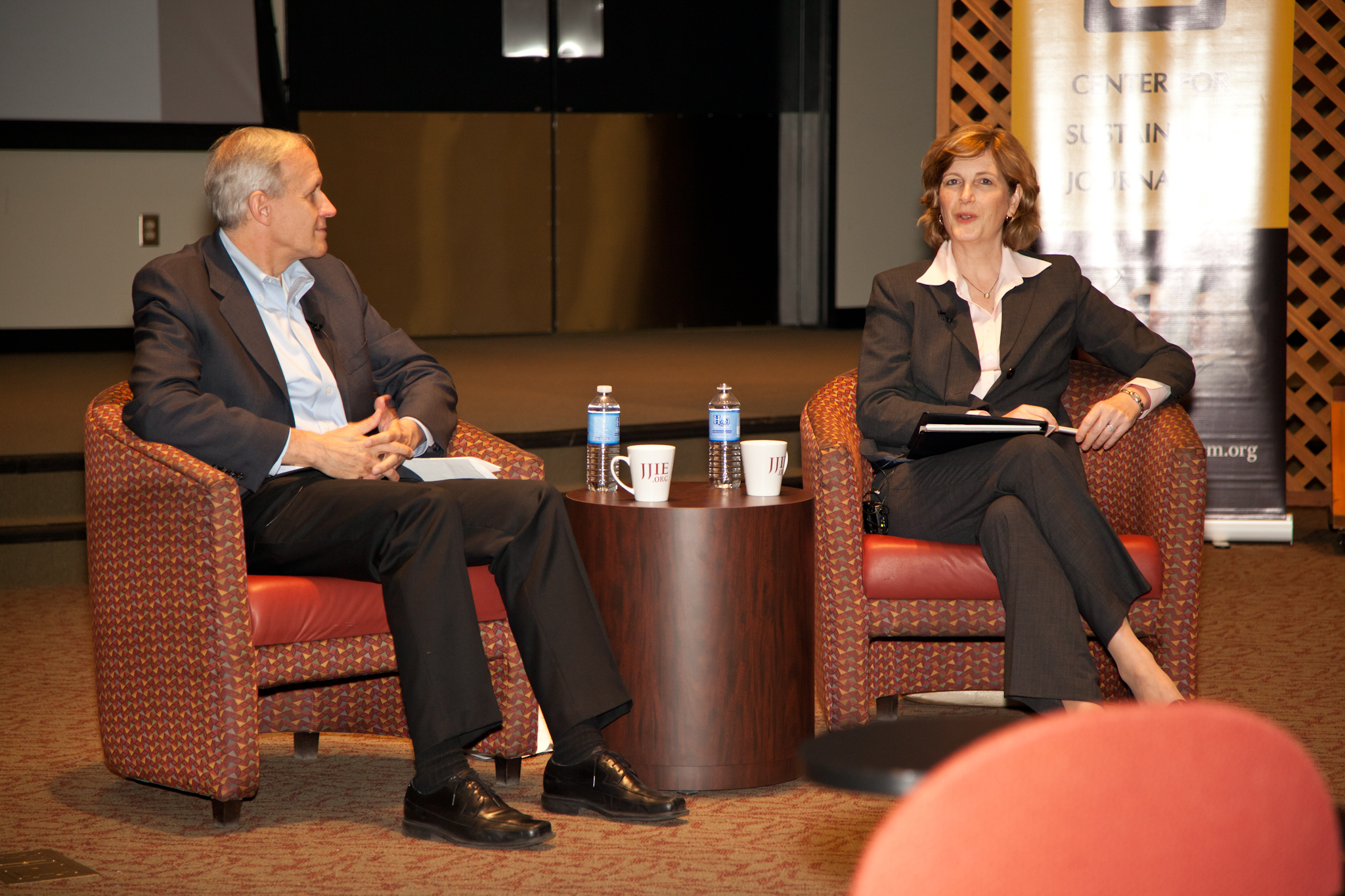
David McCraw of the New York Times Company and Lucy Dalglish, then-executive director of the Reporters Committee for Freedom of the Press, speak about WikiLeaks at Kennesaw State University in 2011.

Since 2012, Bruce Brown has served as the executive director of the Reporters Committee, and worked to expand the organization's pro bono legal services and resources. With the help of Legal Director Katie Townsend, who joined the organization in 2014, he has built a growing litigation practice that offers journalists and media organizations representation, amicus curiae support, and other legal services in cases involving public records and court access, subpoena and libel defense, and more.

In 2014, the Reporters Committee led an effort to unseal transcripts of witness testimony in a grand jury investigation of the Chicago Tribune. The newspaper ran a front-page story about the Battle of Midway. The subsequent grand jury investigation of reporter Stanley Johnston and the Tribune marks the only time in U.S. history that the government has attempted to prosecute a major newspaper for violating the Espionage Act for publishing leaked classified information. The Reporters Committee won the release of the transcripts, which are currently stored at the National Archives.

The Reporters Committee has been a part of several cases involving law enforcement's impersonation of journalists. In 2014, it was revealed that the FBI had impersonated an Associated Press reporter during the course of a 2007 investigation. The Reporters Committee and the AP filed a lawsuit under the Freedom of Information Act for records around the FBI's policies for impersonation, and secured a victory in the D.C. Circuit Court of Appeals in 2017.

In 2016, the Reporters Committee and Time Inc. filed a motion with the U.S. Court of Appeals for the Second Circuit to unseal documents from the 1999 class action lawsuit settlement regarding the construction of Trump Tower. In 2017, the case was returned to the district court, where the request was granted and documents detailing the terms of the more than $1 million settlement were released for the first time.

In 2018, the Reporters Committee also filed a similar lawsuit over the FBI's impersonation of documentary filmmakers.

The Reporters Committee also filed a federal open records lawsuit in 2018 against U.S. Customs and Border Protection (CBP) and the U.S. Department of Homeland Security seeking access to records regarding the government's use of a summons authority in an attempt to force Twitter to reveal the users behind an anonymous account. A court order required CBP to release the records, which showed the summons had been issued improperly.

The Reporters Committee won a four-year lawsuit in 2018 on behalf of journalist Ziva Branstetter and Tulsa World over access to public records related to Oklahoma's botched execution of Clayton Lockett. The court ordered thousands of pages of records to be released and ruled for the first time that public officials' delays in releasing the information violated the public's right of access and Oklahoma Public Records Act.

In 2022, representing the Los Angeles Times in court, the Reporters Committee for Freedom of the Press forced the partial release of the search warrant affidavit in the Senator Richard Burr insider trading investigation.

In November 2024, the Reporters Committee for Freedom of the Press helped the Institute for Nonprofit News secure press credentials for all of its 475 member news organizations.

== Resources ==
In addition to litigation and filing amicus curiae briefs, Reporters Committee for Freedom of the Press supports freedom of information in the United States through a number of free legal resources for those who gather and report the news.

The Legal Hotline is available to journalists and media lawyers with legal questions. The Reporters Committee's Open Government Guide is a complete compendium of information on every state's open records and open meetings laws. The Open Courts Compendium explains court access issues and provides specific additional information for each state and federal circuit. The Reporter's Privilege Compendium is a collection of information on the rights of reporters not to be compelled to testify or disclose sources and information in court in each state and federal circuit. The organization has also represented reporters in court free of charge since its founding.

In 2013, the Reporters Committee also launched iFOIA, a tool to file and track state and federal open records requests, and in 2016 the organization launched the FOIA Wiki, a website devoted to the federal Freedom of Information Act.

The organization also helped found the U.S. Press Freedom Tracker, and in 2018, published a report based on the tracker's data assessing the state of press freedom in the U.S.

Other Reporters Committee resources include a digital interactive map documenting the policies governing public access to police body camera footage in more than 100 police departments, and a record of federal cases since 1844 involving leaks of government information to the news media.

== ProJourn ==
The Reporters Committee operates ProJourn, which connects journalists with pro bono attorneys from law firms and corporate in-house counsel for legal help with public records access, pre-publication review and newsroom operations-related needs.

ProJourn was launched in 2020 by attorneys at Microsoft and Davis Wright Tremaine with the aim of supporting journalists and expanding the bench of attorneys trained in pre-publication review and public records access issues. The Reporters Committee and the John S. and James L. Knight Foundation joined as partners to expand the program.

In 2025, the Reporters Committee partnered with the American Journalism Project to provide free legal support for AJP organizations through ProJourn, with the long-term goal of strengthening the legal infrastructure for nonprofit news.
