= List of United States Supreme Court cases, volume 479 =

This is a list of all the United States Supreme Court cases from volume 479 of the United States Reports:

Case name	Citation	Date decided
Rose v. Ark. State Police	479 U.S. 1	1986
N.C. Dept. of Transp. v. Crest Street Community Council, Inc.	479 U.S. 6	1986
O'Connor v. United States	479 U.S. 27	1986
Kelly v. Robinson	479 U.S. 36	1986
Ansonia Bd. of Ed. v. Philbrook	479 U.S. 60	1986
Cerbone v. Conway	479 U.S. 84	1986
INS v. Hector	479 U.S. 85	1986
Newport v. Iacobucci	479 U.S. 92	1986
Cargill, Inc. v. Monfort of Colo., Inc.	479 U.S. 104	1986
R J. Reynolds Tobacco Co. v. Durham Cnty.	479 U.S. 130	1986
Colorado v. Connelly	479 U.S. 157	1986
Munro v. Socialist Workers Party	479 U.S. 189	1986
Tashjian v. Repub. Party	479 U.S. 208	1986
Federal Election Comm'n v. Mass. Citizens for Life, Inc.	479 U.S. 238	1986
Cal. Fed. Sav. & Loan Ass'n v. Guerra	479 U.S. 272	1987
West Virginia v. United States	479 U.S. 305	1987
Griffith v. Kentucky	479 U.S. 314	1987
324 Liquor Corp. v. Duffy	479 U.S. 335	1987
Burke v. Barnes	479 U.S. 361	1987
Colorado v. Bertine	479 U.S. 367	1987
Clarke v. Securities Ind. Ass'n	479 U.S. 388	1987
Wright v. Roanoke Redevelopment & Housing Auth.	479 U.S. 418	1987
Jersey Shore State Bank v. United States	479 U.S. 442	1987
ICC v. Texas	479 U.S. 450	1987
Pleasant Grove v. United States	479 U.S. 462	1987
Int'l Paper Co. v. Ouellette	479 U.S. 481	1987
Wimberly v. Labor & Ind. Relations Comm'n	479 U.S. 511	1987
Connecticut v. Barrett	479 U.S. 523	1987
California v. Brown	479 U.S. 538	1987
Colorado v. Spring	479 U.S. 564	1987
Curry v. Baker	479 U.S. 1301	1986
Kentucky v. Stincer	479 U.S. 1303	1986
Hicks v. Feiock	479 U.S. 1305	1986
Kleem v. INS	479 U.S. 1308	1986
Ledbetter v. Baldwin	479 U.S. 1309	1986
Ohio Citizens for Responsible Energy, Inc. v. NRC	479 U.S. 1312	1986
