= Complete Auto Transit, Inc. v. Reis =

- Supreme Court of the United States

Decided May 4, 1981
- Full case name: Complete Auto Transit, Inc. v. Reis
- Citations: 451 U.S. 401 (more)

Holding
- Section 301 of Taft-Hartley Act did not create liability for damages for unionists for breach of no-strike clauses.

Court membership
- Chief Justice Warren E. Burger Associate Justices William J. Brennan Jr. · Potter Stewart; Byron White · Thurgood Marshall; Harry Blackmun · Lewis F. Powell Jr. William Rehnquist · John P. Stevens

Case opinions
- Majority: Brennan
- Concurrence: Powell (in part)
- Dissent: Burger, joined by Rehnquist

Laws applied
- Taft-Hartley Act

Complete Auto Transit, Inc. v. Reis, 451 U.S. 401 (1981), was a United States Supreme Court case in which the court held that Section 301 of Taft-Hartley Act did not create liability for damages for unionists for breach of no-strike clauses.
