= Colorado v. Connelly =

Colorado v. Francis Connelly
- Supreme Court of the United States

Argued October 8, 1986 Decided December 10, 1986
- Full case name: Colorado v. Francis Barry Connelly
- Docket no.: 85-660
- Citations: 479 U.S. 157 (more) 107 S. Ct. 515; 93 L. Ed. 2d 473

Case history
- Prior: People v. Connelly, 702 P.2d 722 (Colo. 1985); cert. granted, 474 U.S. 1050 (1986).

Holding
- As Connelly was not coerced by the police to divulge any information, his confession was voluntary, and there was no violation of the Due Process Clause.

Court membership
- Chief Justice William Rehnquist Associate Justices William J. Brennan Jr. · Byron White; Thurgood Marshall · Harry Blackmun; Lewis F. Powell Jr. · John P. Stevens; Sandra Day O'Connor · Antonin Scalia

Case opinions
- Majority: Rehnquist, joined by White, Powell, O'Connor, Scalia; Blackmun (except Part III–A)
- Concurrence: Blackmun
- Concur/dissent: Stevens
- Dissent: Brennan, joined by Marshall

Laws applied
- U.S. Const. Amend. XIV

Colorado v. Connelly, 479 U.S. 157 (1986), was a U.S. Supreme Court case that was initiated by Francis Connelly, who insisted that his schizophrenic episode rendered him incompetent, nullifying his waiver of his Miranda rights.

In Justice Brennan's dissent, he argued that this constituted an involuntary confession and that it violated a ''fundamental right to make a vital choice with a sane mind, involving a determination that could allow the state to deprive him of liberty or even life.''

== Prior history ==
Francis Connelly approached a Denver police officer and expressed interest in talking about a murder that he committed. After being read his rights, Connelly continued to want to confess to the murder, so a detective was called. The detective repeated Connelly's rights again, but Connelly remained willing to discuss the murder. Connelly then waived his right to counsel, and described the details of the murder.

Soon afterwards, the court determined that Connelly was not of sound enough mind to stand trial, and was given six months of therapy. After the six months was completed, Connelly stood trial. During the trial, the psychiatrist that evaluated Connelly testified that he believed that God told him to confess to the murder, or commit suicide. The lower court ruled that Connelly's waiver of his Miranda rights was made when he was incompetent due to his mental illness, so the confession of Connelly was not permitted in court.

The case then went to the Colorado Supreme Court, where the local court's decision was upheld. The evidence of Connelly's confession was suppressed under the Due Process Clause of the Fourteenth Amendment to the United States Constitution.

== Case ==
The Supreme Court heard the case, and decided that Connelly's confession should not have been suppressed, due to a specific sentence in Miranda v. Arizona that stated that confessions may only be thrown out if the accused is coercively interrogated by the government. The Supreme Court reversed the Colorado Supreme Court's decision to suppress the evidence, stating that there was no violation of the due process clause. In the words of the Supreme Court:

Coercive police activity is a necessary predicate to finding that a confession is not "voluntary" within the meaning of the Due Process Clause. Here, the taking of respondent's statements and their admission into evidence constituted no violation of that Clause. While a defendant's mental condition may be a "significant" factor in the "voluntariness" calculus, this does not justify a conclusion that his mental condition, by itself and apart from its relation to official coercion, should ever dispose of the inquiry into constitutional "voluntariness".

== Consequences ==
Connelly significantly changed the voluntariness standard - the test used to determine the admissibility of confessions under the due process clauses of the Fifth and Fourteenth Amendments. Before Connelly the test was whether the confession was voluntary considering the totality of the circumstances. "Voluntary" carried its everyday meaning: the confession had to be a product of the exercise of the defendant's free will rather than police coercion. After Connelly the totality of circumstances test is not even triggered unless the defendant can show coercive police conduct. Questions of free will and rational decision making are irrelevant to a due process claim unless police misconduct existed and a causal connection can be shown between the misconduct and the confession.

== See also ==
- List of United States Supreme Court cases, volume 479
- List of United States Supreme Court cases
- Lists of United States Supreme Court cases by volume
- List of United States Supreme Court cases by the Rehnquist Court
- Exclusionary rule
