= Davis v. United States (1990) =

- Supreme Court of the United States

Argued March 26, 1990 Decided May 21, 1990
- Full case name: Davis, et ux. v. United States
- Citations: 495 U.S. 472 (more) 110 S. Ct. 2014; 109 L. Ed. 2d 457; 1990 U.S. LEXIS 2571; 58 U.S.L.W. 4587; 90-1 U.S. Tax Cas. (CCH) ¶ 50,270; 65 A.F.T.R.2d (RIA) 1051

Case history
- Prior: 664 F. Supp. 468 (D. Idaho 1987); 861 F.2d 558 (9th Cir. 1989).

Holding
- Charitable donations must be given to the qualified organization, not a member acting on its behalf.

Court membership
- Chief Justice William Rehnquist Associate Justices William J. Brennan Jr. · Byron White; Thurgood Marshall · Harry Blackmun; John P. Stevens · Sandra Day O'Connor; Antonin Scalia · Anthony Kennedy

Case opinion
- Majority: O'Connor, joined by unanimous

Laws applied
- 26 U.S.C. § 170

Davis v. United States, 495 U.S. 472 (1990), was a case decided by the United States Supreme Court. It concerned claims made by parents of two missionaries of the Church of Jesus Christ of Latter-day Saints that their monetary contributions toward their sons' mission expenses constituted a "charitable contribution" under provisions of Treas. Reg. § 1.170A-1(g) (1989), a position that lower courts had rejected. In a unanimous decision, the Court ruled that these contributions could not be seen as "charitable contributions" under provisions of that statute.

== Background ==
A husband and wife, who were members of the Church of Jesus Christ of Latter-day Saints, transferred funds into the personal checking accounts of their two sons. These sons had been called to serve as full-time, unpaid missionaries for the Church. The amount transferred equaled the Church's estimated expenses for supporting this service. The sons primarily used these transferred funds to cover rent, food, transportation, and personal needs while on their missions. This expenditure was in line with Church guidelines, which mandated that such funds should only be spent on missionary work and prohibited various leisure or personal activities. The sons submitted weekly expense reports for the week and month to date, even though these guidelines didn't necessitate advance approval for expenditures from their checking accounts.

In their 1984 amended federal income tax returns for the years 1980 and 1981, the parents claimed these amounts as deductible charitable contributions. However, the Internal Revenue Service disallowed these claims, leading the parents to sue for a refund of the claimed amounts under § 170 of the Internal Revenue Code. This section allows deductions for charitable contributions or gifts "to or for the use of" a qualified organization, or as unreimbursed expenditures made incident to the rendition of services to a charitable organization, as defined by Treas. Reg. § 1.170A-1(g) (1989). In a second set of amended tax returns filed in 1986, the parents limited their claimed charitable deductions to the amounts indicated by the Church.

The District Court, granting summary judgment to the United States, found that the payments were not made "for the use of" the Church, as specified in 26 U.S.C. § 170. Additionally, the court determined that the payments did not qualify as "reasonable expenditures" incurred while providing services to the Church, and therefore, they were not deductible under Treas Reg. 1.170A-1(g) (26 CFR 1.170A-1(g)). This regulation stipulates that unreimbursed expenditures made incident to the rendition of services to an organization, contributions to which are deductible, may constitute a deductible contribution under 26 U.S.C. § 170.

The United States Court of Appeals for the Ninth Circuit affirmed the decision of the district court. They held that the funds in question were not deductible under 26 U.S.C. § 170 because the Church lacked actual control over the disposition of the funds. Additionally, 26 CFR 1.170A-1(g) did not apply to the parents, as the regulation permits a deduction for unreimbursed expenses by only the taxpayer who performed the charitable service.

== Opinion of the Court ==
Justice Sandra Day O'Connor wrote an opinion for a unanimous court, affirming the judgment of the lower courts and holding that, for the purposes of 26 U.S.C. § 170, these payments were not charitable contributions "for the use of" petitioners' church. The Court, instead, accepted the government's interpretation of the statute: that a contribution or gift is "for the use of" a qualified organization only when it is held in a legally enforceable trust for the organization or in a similar legal arrangement. Justice O'Connor stated that the legislative history, the generally understood meaning of the language used, and the contemporaneous and longstanding construction all supported this interpretation. In contrast, Petitioners deposited the funds directly into their sons' personal bank accounts. Although the sons promised to spend the money only on church-related expenses, they had no legal obligation to do so. Petitioners did not donate the funds in trust for the church.

Justice O'Connor also concluded that the parents were not entitled to a deduction under 26 CFR 1.170A-1(g), as that regulation allows taxpayers to claim deductions for only the expenditures made in connection with their own contributions of services to charities. Petitioners were unable to claim a deduction for the funds as unreimbursed expenditures incident to a contribution of charitable services under Treas. Reg. § 1.10A-1(g) (1989) since the expenditures were not incurred in connection with petitioners' own rendition of services, and they did not render the services.

== See also ==
- Charitable trust
- List of United States Supreme Court cases, volume 495
