= Owen v. City of Independence =

- Supreme Court of the United States

Argued January 8, 1980 Decided April 16, 1980
- Full case name: Owen v. City of Independence, Missouri, et al.
- Citations: 445 U.S. 622 (more) 100 S. Ct. 1398; 63 L. Ed. 2d 673; 1980 U.S. LEXIS 14

Case history
- Subsequent: Petition for rehearing denied June 2, 1980

Holding
- A municipality has no immunity from liability under Section 1983 flowing from its constitutional violations and may not assert the good faith of its officers as a defense to such liability.

Court membership
- Chief Justice Warren E. Burger Associate Justices William J. Brennan Jr. · Potter Stewart; Byron White · Thurgood Marshall; Harry Blackmun · Lewis F. Powell Jr. William Rehnquist · John P. Stevens

Case opinions
- Majority: Brennan, joined by White, Marshall, Blackmun, Stevens
- Dissent: Powell, joined by Burger, Stewart, Rehnquist

Owen v. City of Independence, 445 U.S. 622 (1980), was a case decided by the United States Supreme Court, in which the court held that a municipality has no immunity from liability under Section 1983 flowing from its constitutional violations and may not assert the good faith of its officers as a defense to such liability.

== Background ==
The city council voted to fire the city's chief of police and in doing so, violated his procedural due process rights to a pre-termination hearing. Plaintiff named the city and city council in the suit.

== Opinion of the Court ==
In an opinion written by Justice Brennan, the Court held that a municipality has no immunity from liability under Section 1983 flowing from its constitutional violations and may not assert the good faith of its officers as a defense to such liability.
