= Trammel v. United States =

- Supreme Court of the United States

Argued October 29–30, 1979 Decided February 27, 1980
- Full case name: Trammel v. United States
- Citations: 445 U.S. 40 (more) 100 S. Ct. 906; 63 L. Ed. 2d 186; 1980 U.S. LEXIS 84; 5 Fed. R. Evid. Serv. (Callaghan) 737

Holding
- The Court modified the Hawkins rule so that the witness-spouse alone has a privilege to refuse to testify adversely; the witness may be neither compelled to testify nor foreclosed from testifying.

Court membership
- Chief Justice Warren E. Burger Associate Justices William J. Brennan Jr. · Potter Stewart; Byron White · Thurgood Marshall; Harry Blackmun · Lewis F. Powell Jr. William Rehnquist · John P. Stevens

Case opinions
- Majority: Burger, joined by Brennan, White, Marshall, Blackmun, Powell, Rehnquist, Stevens
- Concurrence: Stewart

Trammel v. United States, 445 U.S. 40 (1980), is a United States Supreme Court case involving the spousal privilege and its application in the law of evidence. In it, the Court held that the witness-spouse alone has a privilege to refuse to testify adversely; the witness may be neither compelled to testify nor foreclosed from testifying.

In it, the court upheld the conviction of the Petitioner. Prior to presenting his case before the Supreme Court, the Petitioner was convicted of illegally smuggling heroin into the United States and conspiracy to import, based upon the testimony of his wife. The Petitioner then appealed, claiming that the admission of the adverse testimony of his wife, over his objection, contravened prior precedent and therefore constituted reversible error.

The court rejected both traditional and contemporary justifications for the traditional scope of the privilege.

In so ruling, the court held that a witness-spouse alone has a privilege to refuse to testify adversely; the witness may be neither compelled to testify nor foreclosed from testifying.

== Reasoning ==
"(a) The modern justification for the privilege against adverse spousal testimony is its perceived role in fostering the harmony and sanctity of the marriage relationship. While this Court, in Hawkins, reaffirmed the vitality of the common law privilege in the federal courts, it made clear that its decision was not meant to 'foreclose whatever changes in the rule may eventually be dictated by reason and experience.'" 358 U.S. at 358 U. S. 79.

"(b) Rule 501 of the Federal Rules of Evidence acknowledges the federal courts' authority to continue the evolutionary development of testimonial privileges in federal criminal trials 'governed by the principles of the common law as they may be interpreted . . . in the light of reason and experience.'"

"(c) Since 1958, when Hawkins was decided, the trend in state law has been toward divesting the accused of the privilege to bar adverse spousal testimony" [31 states recognized the privilege against adverse spousal testimony at the time of Hawkins, but at the time of this decision only 24 still did].

"(d) Information privately disclosed between husband and wife in the confidence of the marital relationship is privileged under the independent rule protecting confidential marital communications, Blau v. United States, 340 U. S. 332; and the Hawkins privilege, which sweeps more broadly than any other testimonial privilege, is not limited to confidential communications, but is invoked to also exclude evidence of criminal acts and of communications in the presence of third persons. The ancient foundations for so sweeping a privilege -- whereby a woman was regarded as a chattel and denied a separate legal identity -- have long since disappeared, and the contemporary justification for affording an accused such a privilege is unpersuasive. When one spouse is willing to testify against the other in a criminal proceeding -- whatever the motivation -- there is probably little in the way of marital harmony for the privilege to preserve. Consideration of the foundations for the privilege and its history thus shows that 'reason and experience' no longer justify so sweeping a rule as that found acceptable in Hawkins."
