= List of United States Supreme Court cases, volume 451 =

This is a list of all the United States Supreme Court cases from volume 451 of the United States Reports:

| Case name | Citation | Date decided |
|---|---|---|
| Pennhurst State School and Hospital v. Halderman | 451 U.S. 1 | 1981 |
| United Parcel Service, Inc. v. Mitchell | 451 U.S. 56 | 1981 |
| Northwest Airlines, Inc. v. Transport Workers | 451 U.S. 77 | 1981 |
| Memphis v. Greene | 451 U.S. 100 | 1981 |
| Scindia Steam Nav. Co. v. De los Santos | 451 U.S. 156 | 1981 |
| Rosales-Lopez v. United States | 451 U.S. 182 | 1981 |
| Steagald v. United States | 451 U.S. 204 | 1981 |
| Arizona v. Manypenny | 451 U.S. 232 | 1981 |
| Watt v. Alaska | 451 U.S. 259 | 1981 |
| California v. Sierra Club | 451 U.S. 287 | 1981 |
| Milwaukee v. Illinois | 451 U.S. 304 | 1981 |
| Ball v. James | 451 U.S. 355 | 1981 |
| University of Texas v. Camenisch | 451 U.S. 390 | 1981 |
| Staats v. Bristol Laboratories Div. of Bristol-Myers Co. | 451 U.S. 400 | 1981 |
| Complete Auto Transit, Inc. v. Reis | 451 U.S. 401 | 1981 |
| Bullington v. Missouri | 451 U.S. 430 | 1981 |
| Estelle v. Smith | 451 U.S. 454 | 1981 |
| Edwards v. Arizona | 451 U.S. 477 | 1981 |
| Webb v. Webb | 451 U.S. 493 | 1981 |
| Alessi v. Raybestos-Manhattan, Inc. | 451 U.S. 504 | 1981 |
| Parratt v. Taylor | 451 U.S. 527 | 1981 |
| J. Truett Payne Co. v. Chrysler Motors Corp. | 451 U.S. 557 | 1981 |
| United States v. Swank | 451 U.S. 571 | 1981 |
| Rodriguez v. Compass Shipping Co. | 451 U.S. 596 | 1981 |
| Flynt v. Ohio | 451 U.S. 619 | 1981 |
| Beltran v. Myers | 451 U.S. 625 | 1981 |
| Texas Industries Inc. v. Radcliff Materials, Inc. | 451 U.S. 630 | 1981 |
| Western & Southern Life Ins. Co. v. State Bd. of Equalization of Cal. | 451 U.S. 648 | 1981 |
| Clayton v. Automobile Workers | 451 U.S. 679 | 1981 |
| H. A. Artists & Associates, Inc. v. Actors' Equity Assn. | 451 U.S. 704 | 1981 |
| Maryland v. Louisiana | 451 U.S. 725 | 1981 |
| St. Martin Evangelical Lutheran Church v. South Dakota | 451 U.S. 772 | 1981 |
| California v. Prysock | 451 U.S. 1301 | 1981 |
| Becker v. United States | 451 U.S. 1306 | 1981 |
