= Kissinger v. Reporters Committee for Freedom of the Press =

- Supreme Court of the United States

Argued October 3, 1979 Decided March 3, 1980
- Full case name: Kissinger v. Reporters Committee for Freedom of the Press
- Citations: 445 U.S. 136 (more) 100 S. Ct. 960; 63 L. Ed. 2d 267

Case history
- Prior: Reporters Committee for Freedom of Press v. Vance, 442 F. Supp. 383 (D.D.C. 1977); affirmed, 589 F.2d 1116 (D.C. Cir. 1978); cert. granted, 441 U.S. 904 (1979).

Holding
- The Freedom of Information Act does not cover documents removed from governmental custody.

Court membership
- Chief Justice Warren E. Burger Associate Justices William J. Brennan Jr. · Potter Stewart; Byron White · Thurgood Marshall; Harry Blackmun · Lewis F. Powell Jr. William Rehnquist · John P. Stevens

Case opinions
- Majority: Rehnquist, joined by Burger, Stewart, White, Powell
- Concur/dissent: Brennan
- Concur/dissent: Stevens
- Marshall and Blackmun took no part in the consideration or decision of the case.

Kissinger v. Reporters Committee for Freedom of the Press, 445 U.S. 136 (1980), is a decision by the Supreme Court of the United States involving the Freedom of Information Act. The Supreme Court ruled that Henry Kissinger was not required under the Act to turn over transcripts of phone conversations he made as an adviser to President Richard Nixon.

By a 5–2 margin, the court overturned the decisions of two lower Federal courts and decided that Kissinger's removal of the transcripts from the State Department removed the documents from the purview of the Freedom of Information Act. In his opinion for the majority, Associate Justice William H. Rehnquist noted that once the documents had been withdrawn, "the agency has neither the custody or control necessary to enable it to withhold."

Kissinger had removed thousands of pages of the phone transcripts in the waning days of his term as Secretary of State. The documents were first stored at Nelson Rockefeller's Kykuit estate in Westchester County, New York and were later given to the Library of Congress. In a decision affirmed by the United States Court of Appeals, the United States District Court ruled that Kissinger had "wrongfully removed" the documents and ordered the Library of Congress to return the papers to the State Department so that they could be processed for disclosure.

The Supreme Court confirmed the decisions of the lower courts that Kissinger's transcripts when he was Richard Nixon's national security advisor did not fall under the purview of the Freedom of Information Act, nor would it apply to any other members of a President's executive office staff. The only documents that were legitimately covered by the request would have been from his term as Secretary of State from September 1973 to January 1977.
