= Charitable contribution deductions in the United States =

Charitable contribution deductions for United States Federal Income Tax purposes are defined in section 170(c) of the Internal Revenue Code as contributions to or for the use of certain nonprofit enterprises.

== Exclusions of certain amounts from deduction ==
Certain portions of the market value of non-cash donations, such as short-term capital gains, are made non-deductible by I.R.C. 170(e)(1)(A).

== Organization eligibility ==
An organization must meet certain requirements set forth in the code. Some organizations must also file a request with the Internal Revenue Service to gain status as a tax-exempt non-profit charitable organization under section 501(c)(3) of the tax code.

A non-exhaustive list of organizations that may meet the Federal requirements are as follows:

- Synagogues, churches and other religious organizations;
- A fraternal order or lodge
- An organization of war veterans
- Any level of government if the contribution is made for exclusively public purposes
- An organization dedicated to the improvement of public health in the U.S. or abroad

There are both public and private charities. Public charities are far more common.

== Effect of benefit to donor ==
Contributions to charitable organizations are deductible to the donor, unless the donee organization uses any of its net earnings to benefit a private shareholder, or if it attempts to in any way influence political campaigns or legislation.

A contribution to a charitable organization need not be fully a "gift" in the statutory sense of the word to be deductible to the donor. The donor's allowable deduction will be reduced, however, by the amount of the "substantial benefit" conferred upon them as a result of their contribution.

To illustrate, suppose that the American Cancer Society is hosting a formal dance as a fund-raiser (the ACS is a certified charitable organization). Further suppose that the fair market value of a ticket to the dance is $75, and that the donor pays $375 to purchase a ticket. The donor may claim only a $300 deduction, because the amount contributed ($375) is reduced by the amount of the benefit that he received ($75, the fair market value of the ticket). This holds true even if the donor does not actually attend the dance.

The taxable income of the donor is reduced by $300. If the donor's income was in the 35% income tax bracket both before and after the deduction, the donor's tax liability (amount of taxes owed to the government) is reduced by $105.

== Types of contributions ==
The particular tax consequences of a donor's charitable contribution depends on the type of contribution that he makes. A taxpayer may contribute services, cash, or property to a charity. There are a number of traps, especially that donations of short-term capital gains are generally not tax deductible.

=== Services ===
If the donor is contributing his services to a charity, he is not entitled to a deduction for those services. He is however, entitled to deduct his unreimbursed expenses that he incurred in rendering them (except for child care expenses, which are considered non-deductible personal expenses).

==== Example ====
Joy is a professional soccer player who lives in San Diego. She decides to volunteer her time at a non-profit (certified charity) soccer camp, located in Los Angeles for a week. In the ordinary course of things, Joy would charge $10,000 for these services, plus costs of transportation, board, and child care. Assume that Joy's driving costs (gas money, oil change, etc.) amount to $150, the cost of a hotel room for the week is $400, and the cost of child care for her two kids is $500 for the week.

Joy is not entitled to deduct the $10,000 value of "free services" that she performed. Nor is she entitled to deduct the $500 of child care expenses incurred in the week she was volunteering. However, Joy may deduct the $150 car expenses, as well as the $400 hotel expenses incurred in her time volunteering at the camp, for a total deduction of $550.

=== Cash ===
If the donor is contributing cash to the charity, the general rule is that there is only one limitation on the total amount that he is entitled to deduct: He may deduct his contribution only to the extent that it does not exceed 50% of his adjusted gross income. Any amount not deducted in the year he makes the contribution may be carried forward and taken the next year for up to five years. Ordinary assets and short-term capital gain assets (see below) are treated like cash for purposes of the 50% cap.

==== Example ====
To illustrate, suppose that the donor has an adjusted gross income of $100,000. In the year 2004, he gives $60,000 in cash to the American Cancer Society. The donor may deduct only $50,000 in 2004. Why? Because anything over that amount is in excess of 50% of his adjusted gross income. The remaining $10,000 (60,000 total donation minus 50,000 deducted in 2004) carries forward to 2005, at which point he may deduct it.

=== Property ===
If the donor is contributing appreciated property, he is entitled to deduct the value of that property on his tax return for that year. Neither he nor the donee organization will pay tax on the appreciation in the property.

As is common in federal income taxation, there are several special rules and limitations that apply:

==== Ordinary income-producing property and short-term capital gain property ====
If the property that the donor is contributing would have produced either only an ordinary gain or a short-term capital gain had he sold it, then he may deduct only his adjusted basis in the contributed property. The taxpayer may not deduct contributions in an amount greater than 50% of his adjusted gross income (AGI) in the year of donation. Any excess may be carried forward for up to five years and may be deducted subject to the same limitations.

===== Example =====
Abby, our taxpayer, owns a sporting goods store. Her business is doing well so she decides to donate some of last season's inventory to The Women's Sports Foundation, a certified charitable organization.

Abby's adjusted gross income this year is $700,000. The fair market value of Abby's donated inventory is $600,000. Her adjusted basis in the inventory is $400,000. If Abby had sold the inventory, she would have recognized an ordinary gain of $200,000 (fmv of $600,000 minus adjusted basis of $400,000).

To determine the amount that she may deduct as a charitable contribution, Abby must subtract the ordinary gain inherent in the inventory (the $200,000) from the inventory's fair market value (the $600,000). Thus, the amount of Abby's gift is $400,000 (fmv of $600,000 minus inventory's inherent ordinary gain of $200,000).

But remember, since 50% of Abby's AGI is $350,000 she may deduct no more than that. However – assuming her AGI remains at least $100,001 and that she makes no charitable contributions at all next year – she may carry over the $50,000.

==== Long-term capital gain property ====
Charitable donations to public charities and private foundations are subject to overall caps of 50% and 30%, respectively. For example, if a taxpayer contributes cash or short term capital gain property to a public charity, and that cash and property is greater than 50% of his or her adjusted gross income, then any additional contribution (including long term capital gain property) to any charity in that same year can not be deducted.

If a donor is contributing property that would have yielded a long-term capital gain in a sale, then the deduction for the contribution is limited to 30% of donor's adjusted gross income in the year of donation if the donee is a public charity, and limited to 20% if the donee is a private foundation. Contributions over the respective AGI thresholds may be carried forward for five years, and may be deducted in subsequent years pursuant to the same restrictions. This restriction helps certain investors avoid giving themselves into such a low bracket that the tax value of the donation is impaired.

==== Short-term capital gain property ====
A trap for the unwary U.S. investor with an asset on which there have been gains in value who contributes the asset before the gains become long-term. The premature gift forfeits deduction of the short-term gains. The asset can be deducted only up to the amount of its basis, and not up to the amount of its appreciated market value. Only an investor who holds the asset until the capital gains have become long-term is allowed to deduct the appreciated market value.

Internal Revenue Code 170(e)(1)(A) provides:

(e) Certain contributions of ordinary income and capital gain property

(1) General rule The amount of any charitable contribution of property otherwise taken into account under this section shall be reduced by the sum of –

(A) the amount of gain which would not have been long-term capital gain if the property contributed had been sold by the taxpayer at its fair market value (determined at the time of such contribution) ...

==== Short-term capital loss property ====
A further trap awaits the unwary U.S. investor who donates depreciated assets – assets on which there have been losses in value – to charity. The gift actually forfeit the tax deductibility of the capital losses, and only the depreciated (low) market value at the time of the gift is allowed to be deducted, rather than the higher basis. However an investor can instead sell the depreciated assets before considering a donation. An investor who sells can realize the resultant capital loss, which may then be deducted under the applicable capital loss rules. The cash proceeds after liquidating the depreciated asset may of course be donated to charity and deducted following the sale, but the tax advantages of making such donation are no better or worse than in any cash donation to charity. In any case, such a course leaves the investor more after-tax assets to donate if so inclined.

== See also ==
- Davis v. United States (1990)
