= Lewis v. United States (1980) =

- Supreme Court of the United States

Argued January 8, 1980 Decided February 27, 1980
- Full case name: George Calvin Lewis, Jr. v. United States
- Citations: 445 U.S. 55 (more)

Case history
- Prior: Conviction upheld in United States Court of Appeals for the Fourth Circuit, 591 F.2d 978 (1979)

Holding
- Even if a felony conviction can be attacked under Gideon v. Wainwright, the lack of action on the part of the defendant, a pardon, or consent from the Secretary of the Treasury justifies the loss of the defendant's gun rights.

Court membership
- Chief Justice Warren E. Burger Associate Justices William J. Brennan Jr. · Potter Stewart; Byron White · Thurgood Marshall; Harry Blackmun · Lewis F. Powell Jr. William Rehnquist · John P. Stevens

Case opinions
- Majority: Blackmun, joined by Burger, Stewart, White, Rehnquist, Stevens
- Dissent: Brennan, joined by Marshall, Powell

Lewis v. United States, 445 U.S. 55 (1980), is a United States Supreme Court case regarding the prohibition of firearms possession by felons under the Omnibus Crime Control and Safe Streets Act of 1968.

== Background ==
Presumably without an attorney (for the purposes of the Court's argument), George Calvin Lewis Jr. plead guilty in Florida to the felony of breaking and entering with intent to commit a misdemeanor in 1961. Although Gideon v. Wainwright was decided two years later, at no point did Lewis make an effort to challenge his conviction on appeal. Later, in January 1977, Lewis was arrested in Virginia for being a felon in possession of a firearm. During his bench trial, he argued that the allegedly unconstitutional 1961 conviction should not hold weight as inculpatory evidence for the firearm charge. The trial court considered this objection irrelevant as Lewis provided no direct evidence that he was tried without counsel. Lewis then appealed his conviction, where the United States Court of Appeals for the Fourth Circuit upheld the verdict.

== Decision ==
In a 6–3 decision delivered by Justice Blackmun, the Court affirmed the Fourth Circuit's decision. Analyzing the Congressional Record, the Court concluded that the Omnibus Crime Control Act worked to broadly keep firearms out of the hands of people who demonstrated that "they may not be trusted to possess a firearm without becoming a threat to society". Therefore, Lewis had to either prove in court that his prior conviction was invalid, or receive a pardon.
