= Pennsylvania Department of Public Welfare v. Davenport =

- Supreme Court of the United States

Decided May 29, 1990
- Full case name: Pennsylvania Department of Public Welfare v. Davenport
- Citations: 495 U.S. 552 (more)

Holding
- Restitution obligations constitute "debts" within the meaning of § 101(11), and are therefore dischargeable under Chapter 13 of the Bankruptcy Code.

Court membership
- Chief Justice William Rehnquist Associate Justices William J. Brennan Jr. · Byron White; Thurgood Marshall · Harry Blackmun; John P. Stevens · Sandra Day O'Connor; Antonin Scalia · Anthony Kennedy

Case opinions
- Majority: MARSHALL, joined by REHNQUIST, BRENNAN, WHITE, STEVENS, SCALIA, KENNEDY
- Dissent: BLACKMUN, joined by O'CONNOR

Pennsylvania Department of Public Welfare v. Davenport, 495 U.S. 552 (1990), was a United States Supreme Court case in which the court held that restitution obligations constitute "debts" within the meaning of § 101(11), and are therefore dischargeable under Chapter 13 of the Bankruptcy Code.

== Background ==
Edward and Debora Davenport pleaded guilty to welfare fraud and were ordered by a Pennsylvania state court, as a condition of probation, to make monthly restitution payments to the county probation department for the Pennsylvania Department of Public Welfare. Subsequently, respondents filed a petition under Chapter 13 of the Bankruptcy Code in the Bankruptcy Court, listing the restitution obligation as an unsecured debt. After the probation department commenced a probation violation proceeding in state court, alleging that respondents had failed to comply with the restitution order, respondents filed an adversary action in the Bankruptcy Court seeking both a declaration that the restitution obligation was a dischargeable debt and an injunction preventing the probation department from undertaking any further efforts to collect on the obligation. The Bankruptcy Court held that the obligation was an unsecured debt dischargeable under Chapter 13.

The federal District Court reversed, relying on Kelly v. Robinson, 479 U. S. 36, which held that restitution obligations are non-dischargeable in Chapter 7 proceedings because they fall within Code § 523(a)(7)'s exception to discharge for a debt that is a government "fine, penalty, or forfeiture... and is not compensation for actual pecuniary loss." The District Court emphasized the Supreme Court's dicta in Kelly that Congress did not intend to make criminal penalties "debts" under the Code. The court also emphasized the federalism concerns that are implicated when federal courts intrude on state criminal proceedings. The Third Circuit Court of Appeals reversed.

The Supreme Court granted certiorari.

== Opinion of the court ==
The Supreme Court issued an opinion on May 29, 1990.
