= List of United States Supreme Court cases, volume 495 =

This is a list of all the United States Supreme Court cases from volume 495 of the United States Reports:

Case name	Citation	Date decided
Florida v. Wells	495 U.S. 1	1990
New York v. Harris	495 U.S. 14	1990
Missouri v. Jenkins	495 U.S. 33	1990
Venegas v. Mitchell	495 U.S. 82	1990
Minnesota v. Olson	495 U.S. 91	1990
Osborne v. Ohio	495 U.S. 103	1990
Whitmore v. Arkansas	495 U.S. 149	1990
Ngiraingas v. Sanchez	495 U.S. 182	1990
Stewart v. Abend	495 U.S. 207	1990
United States v. Ojeda Rios	495 U.S. 257	1990
California v. American Stores Co.	495 U.S. 271	1990
Port Authority Trans-Hudson Corp. v. Feeney	495 U.S. 299	1990
Delo v. Stokes	495 U.S. 320	1990
Atlantic Richfield Co. v. USA Petroleum Co.	495 U.S. 328	1990
Steelworkers v. Rawson	495 U.S. 362	1990
United States v. Munoz-Flores	495 U.S. 385	1990
Hughey v. United States	495 U.S. 411	1990
North Dakota v. United States	495 U.S. 423	1990
Davis v. United States	495 U.S. 472	1990
California v. FERC	495 U.S. 490	1990
Grady v. Corbin	495 U.S. 508	1990
United States v. Energy Resources Co.	495 U.S. 545	1990
Pennsylvania Dept. of Public Welfare v. Davenport	495 U.S. 552	1990
Taylor v. United States	495 U.S. 575	1990
Burnham v. Superior Court of Cal., County of Marin	495 U.S. 604	1990
Fort Stewart Schools v. FLRA	495 U.S. 641	1990
Citibank, N. A. v. Wells Fargo Asia Ltd.	495 U.S. 660	1990
Duro v. Reina	495 U.S. 676	1990
United States v. Montalvo-Murillo	495 U.S. 711	1990
Demosthenes v. Baal	495 U.S. 731	1990
