= Vitek v. Jones =

- Supreme Court of the United States

Argued December 5, 1979 Decided March 25, 1980
- Full case name: Vitek v. Jones
- Docket no.: 78-1155
- Citations: 445 U.S. 480 (more)
- Argument: Oral argument
- Opinion announcement: Opinion announcement

Case history
- Prior: Miller v. Vitek, 437 F. Supp. 569 (Neb. 1977); Vitek v. Jones 436 U.S. 407 (1978)

Holding
- Prisoners have a right to notice, an adversarial hearing, and counsel before involuntary transfer to psychiatric treatment

Court membership
- Chief Justice Warren E. Burger Associate Justices William J. Brennan Jr. · Potter Stewart; Byron White · Thurgood Marshall; Harry Blackmun · Lewis F. Powell Jr. William Rehnquist · John P. Stevens

Case opinions
- Majority: White, joined by Brennan, Marshall, Powell, Stevens
- Concurrence: Powell (in part)
- Dissent: Stewart, joined by Burger, Rehnquist
- Dissent: Blackmun

Laws applied
- Due Process Clause

Vitek v. Jones, 445 U.S. 480 (1980), is a United States Supreme Court case in which the Court held that state prisoners are entitled to notice, an adversarial hearing, and counsel before their involuntary transfer to state mental hospitals for treatment under the Fourteenth Amendment's Due Process Clause.

== Background ==
Under Nebraska state law, the director of correctional services could transfer state prisoners to a psychiatric hospital if they determined that the prisoner suffered from a mental disorder, and the state would be incapable of proving proper treatment within its prisons. Applying this statute, Nebraska Correctional Services Director Joseph C. Vitek transferred Larry D. Jones from the Nebraska Penal and Correctional Complex to the Lincoln Regional Center Security Building in April 1975.

In September 1977, the US District Court for the District of Nebraska enjoined the state of Nebraska from enforcing this provision. The District Court accepted Jones' argument that requiring him to remain involuntarily confined in state psychiatric treatment until his prison sentence ended would violate his Due Process Clause constitutional right to challenge his transfer.

In November 1977, Jones was granted parole, releasing him from involuntary psychiatric care on the condition that he accept treatment from a Veterans' Administration hospital. In May 1978, the Supreme Court issued a per curiam decision vacating the District Court's injunction and remanding the case to assess whether Jones' conditional release made the dispute moot. Associate Justice John Paul Stevens dissented, reasoning that prisoners released on parole were still within government custody.

In October 1978, the District Court reissued its injunction, finding that without it, there was a threat of Jones being involuntarily re-transferred to a psychiatric hospital. By the time the Supreme Court re-heard the case in December 1979, Jones had violated his parole conditions, leading to his reincarceration in the Nebraska Penal and Correctional Complex.

== Supreme Court ruling ==
=== Majority ===
In the majority opinion written by Associate Justice Byron White, the Supreme Court agreed with the District Court's determination that prisoners have a due process right to challenge the government's claim that they suffer from a mental illness that could not be treated within their prison. While Jones' conviction for robbery justified his prison sentence, the prior state proceedings did not justify subjecting him to the stigma of mental illness and duress of mandatory behavior modification.

=== Concurrence ===
Part IV-B of White's opinion claimed that state governments must provide prisoners facing psychiatric hospital transfer proceedings with a licensed attorney because those with alleged mental illness are "more likely to be unable to understand or exercise [their] rights." In a concurring opinion, Associate Justice Lewis F. Powell Jr. argued that the prisoner's legal assistant simply needs to be qualified and independent. Referencing the Supreme Court's 1973 verdict in Gagnon v. Scarpelli, which denied legal counsel to convicts facing revocation of their probation, Powell reasoned that because the essential facts of a psychiatric transfer hearing would be undisputed, non-lawyers would suffice.

=== Dissents ===
In a dissenting opinion, Associate Justice Potter Stewart contended that Jones' release from the psychiatric hospital made the case moot, claiming that if the state reattempted to involuntarily transfer Jones for treatment, then he could refile his case.

Associate Justice Harry Blackmun dissented on similar grounds, determining that the case was not ripe for adjudication because the Supreme Court's decision to uphold the District Court's injunction was contingent on assuming that the Nebraska Director of Correctional Services would re-transfer Jones to a psychiatric hospital if it were lifted.

== Reaction ==
The American Journal of Law & Medicine criticized the ruling for evaluating Jones' liberty interests against involuntary psychiatric commitment in comparison to the procedural due process rights of prisoners in other proceedings, rather than in comparison to the substantive due process rights of civilians against involuntary psychiatric commitment.
