= Murray Fromson =

American journalist (1929–2018)

- Born: September 1, 1929; The Bronx, New York, U.S.
- Died: June 9, 2018 (aged 88); Los Angeles, California, U.S.
- Resting place: Mount Sinai Memorial Park Cemetery

Murray Fromson (September 1, 1929 – June 9, 2018) was a CBS correspondent and professor emeritus at University of Southern California's School of Journalism, and Center on Public Diplomacy. He was educated in the Los Angeles Unified School District, including Belmont High School in Downtown Los Angeles.

== Biography ==
=== Journalist ===
Fromson first went to Vietnam in 1956 to report the final departure of the French. Periodically over the next four decades he has observed the country at war and peace from the time of the U.S. involvement up through the early 21st century.

Both as a correspondent and producer, Fromson covered some of the major news events of the past half century, including the Korean and Vietnam Wars, the Leonid Brezhnev years of the former Soviet Union, conflicts in Malaya, Indonesia, Burma, and developments in China.

In early 1968, while reporting the Vietnam War for CBS News, Fromson was injured by rocket fire, during the battle for Khe Sanh following the Tet Offensive. He then returned to the U.S. where he worked for CBS out of Chicago.

In the United States, he reported presidential politics, civil rights, the anti-war movement, and the conspiracy trial in Chicago (the trial of the so-called "Chicago Seven").

When the Richard Nixon Justice Department threatened to subpoena journalists' notes and television outtakes in the late 1960s, Fromson proposed the formation of the Reporters Committee for Freedom of the Press.

He and his CBS colleagues were awarded two Overseas Press Club awards for their reporting on the fall of Saigon in 1975.

=== Educator ===
Fromson joined USC's journalism faculty in 1982 and soon founded and directed the Center for International Journalism. The program recruited and trained more than 100 journalists specializing in reporting on Cuba, Mexico and other Latin American nations.

He was Director of USC's School of Journalism in the USC Annenberg School for Communication for five years from 1994 to 1999 when he stepped down to work on a memoir about the Cold War.

In the year 2000, he was named a fellow in the Joan Shorenstein Center on the Press, Politics, and Public Policy at the John F. Kennedy School of Government, a part of Harvard University.
