= Griffith v. Kentucky =

- Supreme Court of the United States

Argued February 14, 1986 Decided January 13, 1987
- Full case name: Randall Lamont Griffith, Petitioner v. Kentucky
- Citations: 479 U.S. 314 (more) 107 S. Ct. 708; 93 L. Ed. 2d 649; 1987 U.S. LEXIS 283

Holding
- The Court held that after a new rule had been decided in a particular case, "the integrity of judicial review requires that we apply that rule to all similar cases pending on direct review."

Court membership
- Chief Justice William Rehnquist Associate Justices William J. Brennan Jr. · Byron White; Thurgood Marshall · Harry Blackmun; Lewis F. Powell Jr. · John P. Stevens; Sandra Day O'Connor · Antonin Scalia

Case opinions
- Majority: Blackmun, joined by Brennan, Marshall, Powell, Stevens, Scalia
- Concurrence: Powell
- Dissent: Rehnquist
- Dissent: White, joined by Rehnquist, O'Connor

Laws applied
- U.S. Const. Amend. XIV

Griffith v. Kentucky, 479 U.S. 314 (1987), is a case decided by the United States Supreme Court.

== Background ==
Randall Lamont Griffith, who is African American, was indicted for first-degree robbery in 1982 at the Circuit Court of Jefferson County, Kentucky. This Supreme Court decision concerned the retrospective application of judge-made rules. Specifically, the Court had to decide whether a prosecutor's use of peremptory challenges to exclude black jurors, combined with his call to the jury clerk, violated the black petitioner's right to an impartial jury. The Court was called upon to decide whether its previous decision in Batson v. Kentucky was applicable to litigation that was not yet final or that was pending on direct review (that is, on direct appeal rather than a collateral attack such as by petition for a writ of habeas corpus) when Batson was decided. Both Griffith and Batson concern trials in the same courthouse.

== Question ==
Could retroactive Supreme Court decisions be applied selectively to cases pending direct review or not yet final?

== Holding ==
The Court held that after a new rule had been decided in a particular case, "the integrity of judicial review requires that we apply that rule to all similar cases pending on direct review." The Court reasoned that selective application of new rules violated the principle of treating similarly situated defendants on an equal basis. The Court also refused to make an exception to the rule of retroactivity in cases where there was a "clean break" with past precedent.

== See also ==
- List of United States Supreme Court cases
  - Lists of United States Supreme Court cases by volume
  - List of United States Supreme Court cases, volume 479
  - List of United States Supreme Court cases by the Rehnquist Court
