= Colorado v. Bertine =

- Supreme Court of the United States

Argued November 10, 1986 Decided January 14, 1987
- Full case name: Colorado v. Steven Lee Bertine
- Docket no.: 85-889
- Citations: 479 U.S. 367 (more) 107 S. Ct. 738; 93 L. Ed. 2d 739
- Argument: Oral argument

Case history
- Prior: People v. Bertine, 706 P.2d 411 (Colo. 1985); cert. granted, 475 U.S. 1081 (1986).

Holding
- The Fourth Amendment does not prohibit a State from proving criminal charges using the evidence discovered during an inventory search.

Court membership
- Chief Justice William Rehnquist Associate Justices William J. Brennan Jr. · Byron White; Thurgood Marshall · Harry Blackmun; Lewis F. Powell Jr. · John P. Stevens; Sandra Day O'Connor · Antonin Scalia

Case opinions
- Majority: Rehnquist, joined by White, Blackmun, Powell, Stevens, O'Connor, Scalia
- Concurrence: Blackmun, joined by Powell, O'Connor
- Dissent: Marshall, joined by Brennan

Laws applied
- U.S. Const. amend. IV

Colorado v. Bertine, 479 U.S. 367 (1987), was a case in which the Supreme Court of the United States held that the Fourth Amendment does not prohibit a State from proving charges with the evidence discovered during an inventory search.

== Background ==
In 1984, Steven Bertine was arrested for driving under the influence.

Prior to his truck being impounded, an officer inventoried the contents according to the department's procedure and discovered a backpack, which he opened. Inside, he discovered controlled substances, paraphernalia, and a large amount of cash. Bertine was subsequently charged with driving under the influence and unlawful possession of cocaine.

At trial, Bertine made a motion to suppress the evidence gathered, arguing that the search violated the Fourth Amendment. The trial court agreed, but relied on the Colorado Constitution.

On appeal, the Supreme Court of Colorado affirmed, relying on the Federal Constitution and the Fourth Amendment.

== Holding ==
The Supreme Court reversed on appeal. Writing for the Majority, Chief Justice Rehnquist relied on past precedent from Illinois v. Lafayette and South Dakota v. Opperman to determine that the government had a legitimate interest in securing the property they took into custody, and that because the purpose of the search was not to uncover evidence, the warrant requirement did not apply.

In particular, the Court held than an officer conducting an inventory search in accordance with a standard department procedure is reasonable, provided that no ulterior investigatory motive exists.

=== Blackmun's Concurrence ===
Justice Blackmun concurred, writing only to emphasize the underlying rationale that police should not have discretion to determine the scope of the search, thus ensuring that inventory searches are not used for the purpose of discovering evidence.

=== Marshall's Dissent ===
In his dissent, Justice Marshall rejected the Majority's determination that the search was required by standardized procedure, noting that the department's policy allows officers discretion in whether to impound a car and therefore whether an inventory search is necessary.

Additionally, Marshall asserted that Bertine reasonably had a greater expectation of privacy in his backpack than in his car, which outweighed the government's interests.
