= Steagald v. United States =

- Supreme Court of the United States

Argued January 14, 1981 Decided April 21, 1981
- Full case name: Gary Steagald v. United States
- Citations: 451 U.S. 204 (more) 101 S. Ct. 1642; 68 L. Ed. 2d 38

Case history
- Prior: 606 F.2d 540, 615 F.2d 642 (affirming district court's denial of motion to suppress and upholding convictions)

Holding
- An arrest warrant is not sufficient under the Fourth Amendment to search the home of a third party unless exigent circumstances are present.

Court membership
- Chief Justice Warren E. Burger Associate Justices William J. Brennan Jr. · Potter Stewart; Byron White · Thurgood Marshall; Harry Blackmun · Lewis F. Powell Jr. William Rehnquist · John P. Stevens

Case opinions
- Majority: Marshall, joined by Brennan, Stewart, Blackmun, Powell, Stevens
- Concurrence: Burger
- Dissent: Rehnquist, joined by White

Laws applied
- U.S. Const. amend. IV; 21 U.S.C. §§ 841(a)(1), 846

Steagald v. United States, 451 U.S. 204 (1981), is a United States Supreme Court case which it was held that, based on the Fourth Amendment, a police officer may not conduct a warrantless search of a third party's home in an attempt to apprehend the subject of an arrest warrant, absent consent or exigent circumstances.

== Factual background ==
In mid-January 1978, a confidential informant contacted an agent of the Drug Enforcement Administration (DEA) in Detroit and provided an Atlanta-area telephone number at which Ricky Lyons, a fugitive subject to a federal arrest warrant related to a marijuana indictment dating back to July 1977, could be reached for the next 24 hours. The Michigan DEA agent relayed the information to a DEA agent in Atlanta, Kelly Goodowens. After contacting Southern Bell Telephone Company to obtain the address corresponding to the telephone number, Goodowens, along with eleven other police officers and federal agents, drove to the lakeside cottage in Buford in order to apprehend the fugitive.

Upon arrival at the address, the officers encountered Hoyt Gaultney and Gary Keith Steagald working on a vehicle outside the home. After frisking both and determining that neither was Lyons, the officers proceeded to the front door, where they met Gaultney's wife, Cathy, who advised that no one else was present in the home. The police nevertheless instructed Gaultney's wife to place her hands on a wall while they conducted a search of the home for Lyons. Although they did not find Lyons, they discovered a small amount of cocaine. Agent Goodowens then instructed a colleague to obtain a search warrant for the home while he and the rest of the officers conducted a second search of the home, which uncovered more cocaine. Once the search warrant for the home was obtained, the house was searched for a third time revealing a clear plastic bag containing 450 grams (approx. 1 pound) of 45% pure cocaine hydrochloride, two suitcases containing 8,394 grams (approx. 18.5 pounds) of 99% pure cocaine hydrochloride and 10,445 grams (approx 23 pounds) of 95% pure cocaine hydrochloride respectively, a box of clear plastic bags, two sets of Ohaus triple beam balance scales, and a bag containing beta-mannitol, a common cutting agent. The approximately 43 pounds of cocaine, with a wholesale value of some $2.5 million at the time, had been smuggled as custom imports from Colombia in hollowed-out ornamental brass lamps and table bases. Gualtney and Steagald were both indicted on federal drug charges as a result. While the officers were at the home, James "Jimmy" Albert Smith, to whom the house in question had been leased and who was the subject of a state arrest warrant related to drug charges, arrived in a pickup truck and was immediately arrested.

== Procedural history ==
Steagald asked the trial court to suppress the evidence discovered through the warrantless search pursuant to the exclusionary rule. The trial court denied the motion to suppress and Gualtney and Steagald were convicted. Steagald and Gaultney then moved for a mistrial, which the trial court denied, prompting them to appeal the convictions to United States Court of Appeals for the Fifth Circuit. In a 2–1 opinion, the Fifth Circuit agreed with the district court that the arrest warrant for Lyons was sufficient grounds for law enforcement to search the premises and affirmed the convictions. In so doing, the Fifth Circuit relied on their own precedent in United States v. Cravero, 545 F.2d 406, 421 (5th Cir. 1976), which held that "when an officer holds a valid arrest warrant and reasonably believes that its subject is within premises belonging to a third party, he need not obtain a search warrant to enter for the purpose of arresting the subject." Steagald then appealed to the Supreme Court of the United States, which granted certiorari to decide whether the government may search a third-party's property pursuant to an arrest warrant without the owner's consent.

== Supreme Court decision ==
Justice Thurgood Marshall delivered the majority opinion of the court in favor of Steagald. The court held that an arrest warrant authorizes police to arrest the subject of the warrant, but does not authorize them to enter a third party's home in search of that person. The court reasoned that since the purpose of a warrant is to allow for judicial review of determinations by law enforcement regarding probable cause, an arrest warrant is distinct from a search warrant in that the probable-cause determination under review is different. An arrest warrant certifies that there is probable cause that a person has committed a crime and therefore the police are justified in seizing (i.e., taking into custody) the subject of the warrant. For a search warrant, on the other hand, the judicial officer reviews whether the police have probable cause to search a particular location for a specific object, justifying intrusion of the interest in privacy by entering the premises. Allowing the police to enter any place where they suspected the subject of an arrest warrant might be would pave the way for abuse because police could, for example, search the home of every known family member and acquaintance of the subject. Accordingly, the Supreme Court reversed the Fifth Circuit's ruling that an arrest warrant justifies the search of a third party's home and remanded the case to the trial court for further proceedings consistent with the Fourth Amendment.

Justice Rehnquist, in his dissent, argued that it is not reasonable to expect the police to secure a separate warrant for premises belonging to a third party when they already have probable cause to believe the fugitive is there because fugitives are, by their very nature, highly mobile. Therefore, while the police are attempting to secure the warrant, the suspect might escape.

== See also ==
- List of United States Supreme Court cases, volume 451
