= United States v. Watson =

- Supreme Court of the United States

Argued October 8, 1975 Decided January 26, 1976
- Full case name: United States v. Henry Ogle Watson
- Docket no.: 74-538
- Citations: 423 U.S. 411 (more) 96 S. Ct. 820; 46 L. Ed. 2d 598

Case history
- Prior: 504 F.2d 849 (9th Cir. 1974); cert. granted, 420 U.S. 924 (1975).

Holding
- Warrantless arrests in public are allowed under the Fourth Amendment.

Court membership
- Chief Justice Warren E. Burger Associate Justices William J. Brennan Jr. · Potter Stewart; Byron White · Thurgood Marshall; Harry Blackmun · Lewis F. Powell Jr. William Rehnquist · John P. Stevens

Case opinions
- Majority: White, joined by Burger, Blackmun, Powell, Rehnquist
- Concurrence: Powell
- Concurrence: Stewart (in judgment)
- Dissent: Marshall, joined by Brennan
- Stevens took no part in the consideration or decision of the case.

Laws applied
- U.S. Const. amend. IV

United States v. Watson, 423 U.S. 411 (1976), was a case decided by the Supreme Court of the United States that decided that a warrantless arrest in public and consenting to a vehicle search did not violate the Fourth Amendment.

== Facts ==
On August 17, 1972, an informant, identified as Awad "Tony" Khoury, telephoned a postal inspector named Frank L. Barbarick to inform him that one Henry Ogle Watson was in possession of a stolen Bank of America credit card that belonged to a Syed T. Ahmed.

Barbarick told the informant to come to his office to inspect the card. When the informant came to his office, he stated to Barbarick that Watson mailed him the card, so that Khoury could purchase him TWA airline tickets with the card. Prior to the case, the informant provided information to the United States Postal Inspection Service 5 to 10 times, all of them being substantiated. These reports also involved Watson.

The inspector and informant agreed to set up a sting operation to catch Watson. Upon learning that Watson agreed to send additional cards, the inspector arranged the informant to meet with Watson. A potential meeting was scheduled on August 22, but Watson canceled the appointment. A second meeting took place the day after at a restaurant that was chosen by the informant. The inspector instructed the informant to give a signal to other inspectors if Watson had indeed possessed additional credit cards.

Having confirmed that Watson did have additional cards, the informant signaled the inspectors, and they removed him from the restaurant and arrested him. When the inspectors searched Watson's person, no credit cards were found on him. The inspectors then asked Watson if they can search his car, which was near the restaurant, he consented, replying "Go ahead." When the inspector warned him that,"If I find anything, it is going to go against you," Watson replied with the same answer. After finding Watson's car keys, the inspector opened the car door, and found an envelope under the floor mat, containing two credit cards with different names. He was then charged with four counts involving possession of stolen mail.

=== Trial and Appeals ===
Watson filed a pre-trial motion to suppress against the evidence that was found in his car, claiming that there was a lack of probable cause and that him saying,"Go ahead." was involuntary, due to him not being told that he could withhold consent. The motion was denied, and he was convicted on all three counts, the fourth count being dismissed. The only physical evidence were the credit cards and envelope found in his car. His conviction was reversed by the Federal Court of Appeals, Ninth Circuit, arguing that,"

The record reveals that both parties, the court and the jury all were under the impression that the stipulation had been entered in the record. The agreement to stipulate was communicated to the court prior to the empanelling of the jury. The stipulation was read to the jury in the government's opening statement. The defense counsel referred to the stipulation during his cross-examination. The appellant himself made reference to the stipulation. Since all parties concerned were under the impression that the stipulation had been entered in the record, the defendant-appellant cannot be allowed to benefit from a purely technical error, if in fact there was error.

Appellant next contends that (A) the hearing on the motion to suppress failed to establish that the informant's reliability was sufficient to warrant use of his 'tip'; (B) he contends that the failure to obtain an arrest warrant vitiates the arrest and subsequent seizure; and (C) he contends that a consent to search cannot be acquired during an illegal detention and that his consent was not shown to be voluntary and knowledgeable.

As to appellant's first contention, the Judge at the suppression hearing found that the informant's reliability had been established by the testimony of Inspector Barbarick and that the reliability standards of Aguilar v. Texas, 378 U.S. 108, 84 S.Ct. 1509, 12 L.Ed.2d 723, and Spinelli v. United States, 393 U.S. 410, 89 S.Ct. 584, 21 L.Ed.2d 637 had been met. Inspector Barbarick testified that he had been contacted by Informant Khoury prior to August 17, 1972, on five to ten occasions and that Khoury had related information concerning appellant Watson and his associates and that the information supplied helped in knowing the whereabouts of people that were involved in mail theft throughout the Los Angeles area. There is sufficient evidence to support the trial judge's finding that Khoury was 'reliable'. Consequently, on August 17, 1972, when Khoury gave Barbarick the credit card which he said he had received from Watson, probable cause existed to arrest appellant Watson for mail theft.

Appellant's second contention has merit, i.e. the failure to obtain an arrest warrant vitiates the arrest. As stated above, Inspector Barbarick had probable cause to arrest appellant on the 17th of August, 1972. However, the arrest was not made until six days later—on the 23rd of August. There appears to be no reason for the failure to present the question to a detached magistrate to obtain an arrest warrant.

'The case of Warden v. Hayden, (387 U.S. 294, 87 S.Ct. 1642, 18 L.Ed.2d 782) where the Court elaborated a 'hot pursuit' justification for the police entry into the defendant's house without a warrant for his arrest, certainly stands by negative implication for the proposition that an arrest warrant is required in the absence of exigent circumstances.' Coolidge v. New Hampshire, 403 U.S. 443, 480, 91 S.Ct. 2022, 2045, 29 L.Ed.2d 564. '(The warrant requirement) is not an inconvenience to be somehow 'weighed' against the claims of police efficiency. It is, or should be, an important working part of our machinery of government, operating as a matter of course to check the 'well-intentioned but mistakenly over-zealous executive officers' who are a part of any system of law enforcement.' Coolidge, supra at 481, 91 S.Ct. at 2046. The government in this case has shown no 'exigent' circumstances which would justify not obtaining an arrest warrant during the six-day interim period between the 17th of August and the day of the actual arrest. The arrest of the appellant was in violation of the 4th Amendment to the U.S. Constitution.

Thirdly, appellant attacks the voluntariness of his consent to search. At the time appellant consented to the search, he was under arrest. Nothing in the record indicates that he knew of or was advised of his right not to consent to the search of his automobile.

At the time of the consent to the search of this car, the law of the Ninth Circuit required a showing that the defendant knew he could withhold his consent and a showing as to whether any consent was coerced or uncoerced. Schoepflin v. United States, 391 F.2d 390 (9th Cir. 1968). However, in Schneckloth v. Bustamonte, 412 U.S. 218, 93 S.Ct. 2041, 36 L.Ed.2d 854 (1973), the Supreme Court, reversing an earlier decision by this court, 448 F.2d 699 (9th Cir. 1971), held that:

'...Voluntariness is a question of fact to be determined from all the circumstances, and while the subject's knowledge of a right to refuse is a factor to be taken into account, the prosecution is not required to demonstrate such knowledge as a prerequisite to establishing a voluntary consent...'

Recently, in United States v. Rothman, 492 F.2d 1260 (9th Cir., 1973), this court, conceding that Schneckloth is limited by its facts to cases in which the consenting party is not in custody, observed that we have never applied a different test for consent searches on the basis of the pre-consent arrest of the consenting party and held that 'arrest is but one factor, albeit a critical one, in determining whether or not the consent was voluntary.' 492 F.2d at 1264 n. 1. Hence, the Supreme Court's 'totality of circumstances' test applies to all consent search situations, whether or not the consenting party is under arrest.

Here, we find that the totality of circumstances strongly suggests coercion. Appellant had been placed under arrest and was in custody at the time that he gave the officers permission to search his car.

'. . . In looking at the factual issue of voluntariness, the court must be aware of the 'vulnerable subjective state' of the defendant as well as the possibility of 'subtly coercive police questions.' Schneckloth v. Bustamonte, supra, 412 U.S. at 229, 93 s,.Ct. 2041, 36 L.Ed.2d 854 and the inherently coercive nature of custodial interrogation, Id. at 247, 93 S.Ct. 2041, 36 L.Ed.2d 854.' United States v. Rothman, 492 F.2d at 1265.

Not only was appellant Watson in custody, he was in custody in violation of the Fourth Amendment, since the agents had failed to obtain an arrest warrant. Moreover, in Rothman, where we held that the defendant had not properly consented to a search, the defendant admitted that he knew that he had a right to refuse. Here, nothing indicates that Watson knew or was advised of his right not to consent to the search of his automobile. Hence, in light of Schneckloth and Rothman, we hold that the in custody search of the appellant was invalid, and the fruits of the search should have been suppressed."

== Holding ==
The Court decided the case with a 6-2 majority vote (Stevens did not participate in the case) that the arrest of Watson and the consent and subsequent search of his car, did not violate the Fourth Amendment, effectively reversing the Ninth Circuit decision.

=== Reasoning ===
The Court relied on (1) "the well-settled common-law rule that a warrantless arrest in a public place is valid if the arresting officer had probable cause to believe the suspect is a felon; (2) the clear consensus among the States adhering to that well-settled common-law rule; (3) the expression of the judgment of Congress that such an arrest is reasonable"; (4) "By regulation, 39 CFR § 232.5(a)(3) (1975), and in identical language, the Board of Governors has exercised that power and authorized warrantless arrests. Because there was probable cause in this case to believe that Watson had violated § 1708, the inspector and his subordinates, in arresting Watson, were acting strictly in accordance with the governing statute and regulations. The effect of the judgment of the Court of Appeals was to invalidate the statute as applied in this case and as applied to all the situations where a court fails to find exigent circumstances justifying a warrantless arrest. We reverse that judgment"; and (5) "Because our judgment is that Watson's arrest comported with the Fourth Amendment, Watson's consent to the search of his car was not the product of an illegal arrest. To the extent that the issue of the voluntariness of Watson's consent was resolved on the premise that his arrest was illegal, the Court of Appeals was also in error.

We are satisfied in addition that the remaining factors relied upon by the Court of Appeals to invalidate Watson's consent are inadequate to demonstrate that, in the totality of the circumstances, Watson's consent was not his own "essentially free and unconstrained choice" because his "will ha[d] been overborne and his capacity for self-determination critically impaired." Schneckloth v. Bustamonte, 412 U.S. 218, 225 (1973). There was no overt act or threat of force against Watson proved or claimed. There were no promises made to him and no indication of more subtle forms of coercion that might flaw his judgment. He had been arrested and was in custody, but his consent was given while on a public street, not in the confines of the police station. Moreover, the fact of custody alone has never been enough in itself to demonstrate a coerced confession or consent to search. Similarly, under Schneckloth, the absence of proof that Watson knew he could withhold his consent, though it may be a factor in the overall judgment, is not to be given controlling significance. There is no indication in this record that Watson was a newcomer [p425] to the law, [n14] mentally deficient, or unable in the face of a custodial arrest to exercise a free choice. He was given Miranda warnings, and was further cautioned that the results of the search of his car could be used against him. He persisted in his consent.

In these circumstances, to hold that illegal coercion is made out from the fact of arrest and the failure to inform the arrestee that he could withhold consent would not be consistent with Schneckloth and would distort the voluntariness standard that we reaffirmed in that case."

=== Powell's concurrence ===
Justice Lewis Powell concurred with the majority opinion, arguing that this case was the definitive holding on the constitutionality of a warrantless arrest in a public place. He wrote,"

In reversing the Court of Appeals, the Court concludes that nothing in our previous cases involving warrantless arrests supports the position of respondent and the Court of Appeals. See, e.g., Gerstein v. Pugh, 420 U.S. 103, 113 (1975). But it is fair to say, I think, that the prior decisions of the Court have assumed the validity of such arrests without addressing in a reasoned way the analysis advanced by respondent. [n1] Today's decision is [p427] the first square holding that the Fourth Amendment permits a duly authorized law enforcement officer to make a warrantless arrest in a public place even though he had adequate opportunity to procure a warrant after developing probable cause for arrest."

"Moreover, a constitutional rule permitting felony arrests only with a warrant or in exigent circumstances could severely hamper effective law enforcement. Good police practice often requires postponing an arrest, even after probable cause has been established, in order to place the suspect under surveillance or otherwise develop further evidence necessary to prove guilt to a jury. [n4] Under the holding of the Court of Appeals, such additional investigative work could imperil the entire prosecution. Should the officers fail to obtain a warrant initially, and later be required by unforeseen circumstances to arrest immediately with no chance to procure a last-minute warrant, they would risk a court decision that the subsequent exigency did not excuse their failure to get a warrant in the interim since they first developed probable cause. If the officers attempted to meet such a contingency [p432] by procuring a warrant as soon as they had probable cause, and then merely held it during their subsequent investigation, they would risk a court decision that the warrant had grown stale by the time it was used. [n5] Law enforcement personnel caught in this squeeze could ensure validity of their arrests only by obtaining a warrant and arresting as soon as probable cause existed, thereby foreclosing the possibility of gathering vital additional evidence from the suspect's continued actions."

=== Stewart's concurrence ===
Potter Stewart concurred, arguing that the Supreme Court should not measure what circumstances the officer must pass before getting an arrest warrant, if the crime takes place in public and in broad daylight,"The arrest in this case was made upon probable cause in a public place in broad daylight. The Court holds that this arrest did not violate the Fourth Amendment, and I agree. The Court does not decide, nor could it decide in this case, whether or under what circumstances an officer must obtain a warrant before he may lawfully enter a private place to effect an arrest. See Gerstein v. Pugh, 420 U.S. 103, 113 n. 13; Coolidge v. New Hampshire, 403 U.S. 443, 474-481; Davis v. Mississippi, 394 U.S. 721, 728; Jones v. United States, 357 U.S. 493, 499-500."

=== Marshall's dissent ===
Thurgood Marshall dissented, with Brennan joining, claiming that this decision gave broad powers to police to arrest suspects in public without a warrant. Furthermore, he argues that the cases cited in the majority opinion do not support the ruling, along with common law. Also, he exclaims that the Court did not adequately measure the facts in the case before deciding. "By granting police broad powers to make warrantless arrests, the Court today sharply reverses the course of our modern decisions construing the Warrant Clause of the Fourth Amendment. The Court turns next to the "consent to search" question last dealt with in Schneckloth [p434] v. Bustamonte, 412 U.S. 218 (1973). Without acknowledgment or analysis, the Court extends the scope of that decision to the situation expressly reserved in Schneckloth, and creates a rule inconsistent with Schneckloth's own analysis. The Court takes both steps with a remarkable lack of consideration of either the facts of this case or the constitutional questions it is deciding. That is unfortunate not only because, in my view, the Court decides the constitutional questions wrongly, but also because consideration would have shown that the first question decided today is not raised by the facts before us, and that the second question should not be resolved here, given the present posture of this case. I respectfully dissent." "Since, for reasons it leaves unexpressed, the Court does not take this traditional course, I am constrained to express my views on the issues it unnecessarily decides. The Court reaches its conclusion that a warrant is not necessary for a police officer to make an arrest in a public place, so long as he has probable cause to believe a felony has been committed, on the basis of its views of precedent and history. As my Brother POWELL correctly observes, ante at 426-427, n. l (concurring), the precedent is spurious. None of the cases cited by the Court squarely confronted the issue decided today. Moreover, an examination of the history relied on by the Court shows that it does not support the conclusion laid upon it."
