= Minnesota v. Olson =

- Supreme Court of the United States

Argued February 26, 1990 Decided April 18, 1990
- Full case name: Minnesota v. Olson
- Citations: 495 U.S. 91 (more)

Holding
- A person staying as a guest in the house of another has a legal expectation of privacy; warrantless entry into that house to arrest the person taints the arrest.

Court membership
- Chief Justice William Rehnquist Associate Justices William J. Brennan Jr. · Byron White; Thurgood Marshall · Harry Blackmun; John P. Stevens · Sandra Day O'Connor; Antonin Scalia · Anthony Kennedy

Case opinions
- Majority: White, joined by Brennan, Marshall, Stevens, O'Connor, Scalia, Kennedy
- Concurrence: Stevens, Kennedy
- Dissent: Rehnquist, Blackmun

Laws applied
- U.S. Const. amend. IV

Minnesota v. Olson, 495 U.S. 91 (1990), is a landmark search and seizure case decided by the Supreme Court of the United States. In a 7–2 decision, the court held that a person staying as a guest in the house of another had a legal expectation of privacy, and that a warrantless entry into that house to arrest the person tainted the arrest and the individual's subsequent statements.

== Facts ==
Police suspected a man named Olson of being the driver of a getaway car in a robbery-murder. After recovering the murder weapon and arresting the suspected murderer, they surrounded the home of two women with whom they believed Olson had been staying. When police telephoned the home and told one of the women that Olson should come out, a male voice was heard saying "tell them I left". Without seeking permission, and with weapons drawn, the police entered the home, found Olson hiding in a closet, and arrested him. Shortly thereafter, he made a self-incriminating statement, which the trial court refused to suppress. He was convicted of murder, armed robbery, and assault. The Minnesota Supreme Court reversed, ruling that Olson had a sufficient interest in the women's home to challenge the legality of his warrantless arrest, that the arrest was illegal because there were no exigent circumstances to justify warrantless entry, and that his statement was tainted, and should have been suppressed.

== Holding ==
The U.S. Supreme Court upheld the determination of the Minnesota Supreme Court that the arrest violated Olson's rights under the Fourth Amendment to the United States Constitution.

Olson's status as an overnight guest was sufficient to show that he had an expectation of privacy in the home that society is prepared to recognize as reasonable. The state sought to distinguish the case from precedents where an overnight guest was left alone in the house, had a key to the premises, and could admit or exclude others, but the court found that these were not legally determinative. Instead, the court found that all citizens share the expectation that hosts will more likely than not respect their guests' privacy interests even if the guests have no legal interest in the premises and do not have the legal authority to determine who may enter the household.

The State Supreme Court applied essentially the correct standard in holding that there were no exigent circumstances justifying the warrantless entry: an entry may be justified by hot pursuit of a fleeing felon, the imminent destruction of evidence, the need to prevent a suspect's escape, or the risk of danger to the police or others; but, in the absence of hot pursuit, there must be at least probable cause to believe that one or more of the other factors were present and, in assessing the risk of danger, the gravity of the crime and likelihood that the suspect is armed should be considered. The lower court had noted that, although a grave crime was involved, Olson was known not to be the murderer and the murder weapon had been recovered; that there was no suggestion of danger to the women; that several police squads surrounded the house; that it was Sunday afternoon; that it was evident that the suspect was going nowhere; and that, if he came out of the house, he would have been promptly apprehended.

The case "addressed an important procedural question in Fourth Amendment litigation: Is the person seeking to challenge the legality of the search or seizure the "victim" of the government activity?" Despite not being the homeowner of the residence that was entered, Olson did have the legal right to object to the police entering the home.
