= Prison–industrial complex =

Attribution of the U.S.'s high incarceration rate to profit

Correctional populations in the U.S., 1980–2013

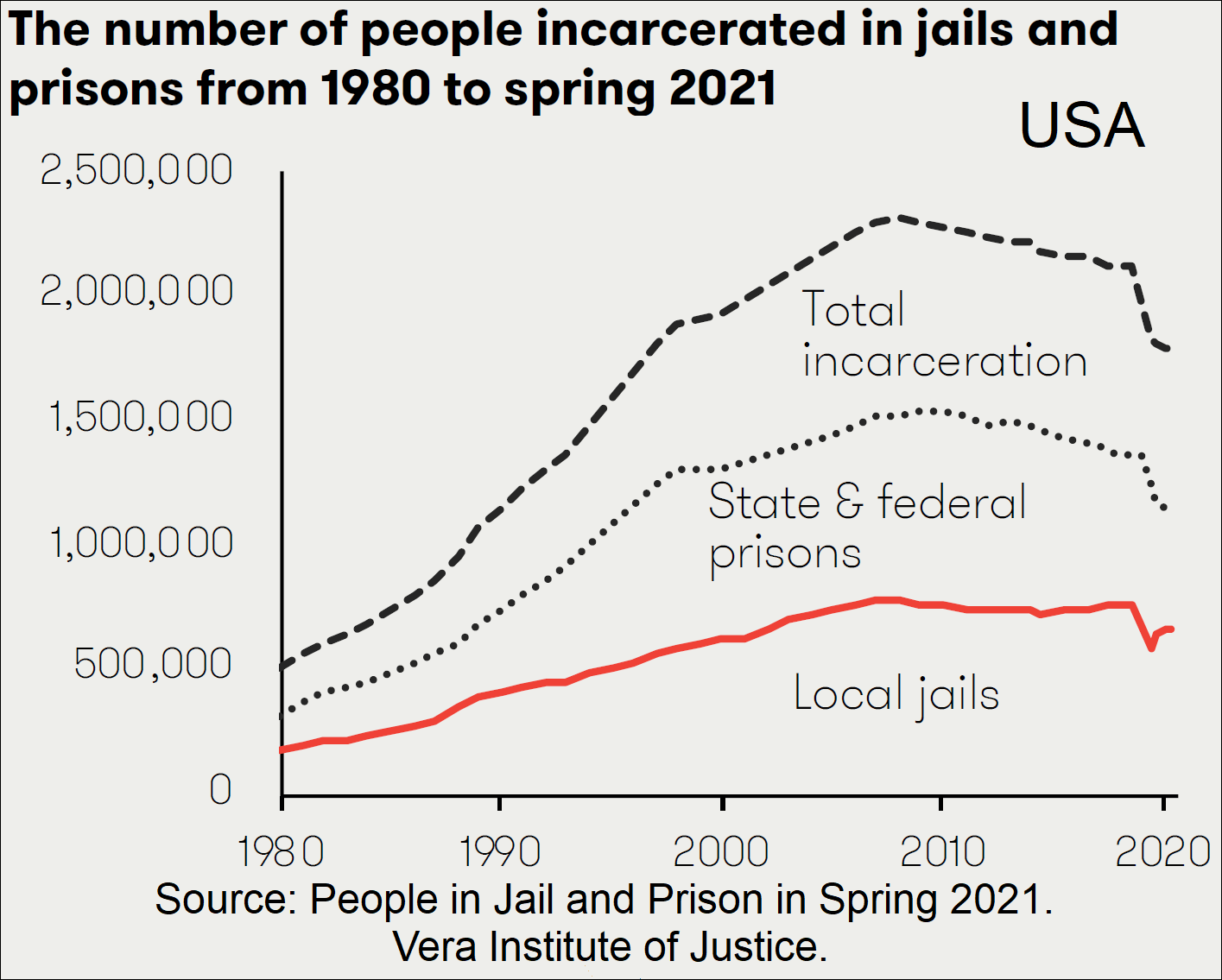
US timeline graphs of number of people incarcerated in jails and prisons

The prison–industrial complex (PIC) is a term, coined after the "military–industrial complex" of the 1950s, used by scholars and activists to describe the many relationships between institutions of imprisonment (e.g., prisons, jails, detention facilities, and psychiatric hospitals) and the various establishments that profit from them.

The term is most often used in the context of the contemporary United States, where the expansion of the U.S. inmate population has resulted in economic profit and political influence for private prisons and other companies that supply goods and services to government prison agencies. According to this concept, incarceration not only upholds the justice system, but also subsidizes construction companies, companies that operate prison food services and medical facilities, surveillance and corrections technology vendors, telecommunications, corporations that contract cheap prison labor, correctional officers unions, private probation companies, criminal lawyers, and the lobby groups that represent them. That is, the PIC is not just a singular relationship born between inmate and incarceration, but rather as system whose arms influence and reach most all, in one way or another, spheres of social, economic, and political nodes of life. The term also refers more generally to interest groups who, in their interactions with the prison system, prioritize financial gain over rehabilitating criminals.

Proponents of this concept, including civil rights organizations such as the Rutherford Institute and the American Civil Liberties Union (ACLU), believe that the economic incentives of prison construction, prison privatization, prison labor, and prison service contracts have transformed incarceration into an industry capable of growth, and have contributed to mass incarceration. These advocacy groups note that incarceration affects people of color at disproportionately high rates.

Many commentators use the term "prison–industrial complex" to refer strictly to private prisons in the United States, an industry that generates approximately $4 billion of revenue a year. Others note that fewer than 10% of U.S. inmates are incarcerated in for-profit facilities, and use the term to diagnose a larger confluence of interests between the U.S. government, at the federal and state levels, and the private businesses that profit from the increasing surveillance, policing, and imprisonment of the American public since approximately 1980.

== History ==
Early American jails were largely privately managed, holding both criminals awaiting trial and debtors awaiting repayment, and charging holding fees to local governments and creditors. After the first publicly-run prison was established in 1790 in Pennsylvania, private business involvement in corrections largely diminished to providing contracted services, such as food preparation, medical care, and transportation. The major 19th-century exception to the relative separation between public punishment and private industry was the convict lease system in the American South, in which private parties paid public prisons for forced prisoner labor.

During the mass unemployment of the Great Depression, business leaders and unions successfully pressured the federal government to prohibit private corporations from contracting cheap prison labor and undercutting competition. In 1930, the federal government established Federal Prison Industries, a prison labor program to produce goods and services for the public sector.

Many scholars and activists argue that the contemporary prison–industrial complex has its origins in the war on drugs, a legislative campaign orchestrated by the U.S. federal government since the early 1970s aimed at criminalizing and punishing drug trafficking and use. Following tougher anti-drug legislation and harsher sentencing standards under the presidential administrations of Richard Nixon and Ronald Reagan, incarceration increasingly became the standard punishment for non-violent offenses. As the overall incarcerated population dramatically increased, new correctional facilities needed to be built, staffed, and maintained, and private-sector prisons began to emerge as cost-effective solutions. Also during this period private-sector wage labor was reintroduced into the national prison system.

The number of Americans awaiting trial or serving a sentence for a drug conviction in prison or jail increased from about 40,000 in 1980 to about 450,000 in 2004. In May 2021 the Federal Bureau of Prisons listed 46.3 percent of federal inmates as incarcerated because of drug convictions.

=== 1970s ===
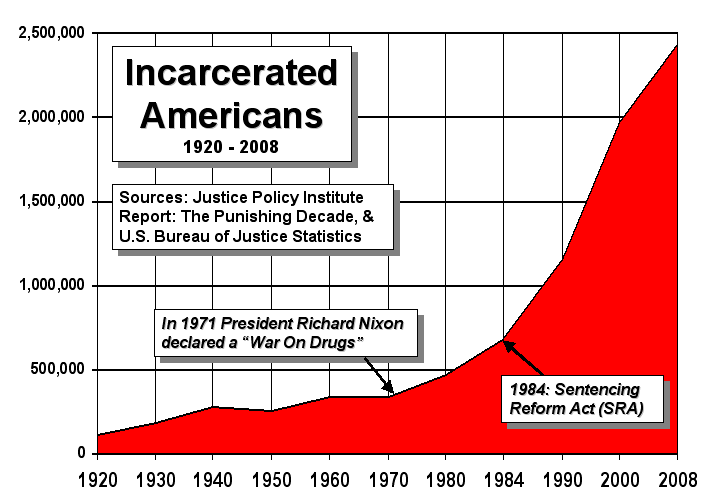
US incarceration timeline

In 1973, following the lead of President Nixon, New York State passed the Rockefeller Drug Laws, establishing mandatory minimum prison sentences for small-scale drug possession. Although not as harsh as Governor Nelson Rockefeller had originally called for, these laws inspired other states to enact similarly strict punishments for drug offenses, including mandatory minimum sentences in almost every instance. Also in 1973, conservative businesses and tough-on-crime politicians came together to establish the influential lobbying group American Legislative Exchange Council (ALEC).

In 1977, the U.S. Supreme Court case Jones v. North Carolina Prisoners’ Labor Union restricted prisoners’ First Amendment rights to free speech and assembly, and prohibited them from organizing labor unions. In 1979, inspired by legislation proposed by ALEC, the U.S. Congress overturned the New Deal–era legislation against for-profit prison labor by establishing the Prison Industry Enhancement Certification Program (PIE). Intended to allow inmates to contribute to society, offset the cost of their incarceration, reduce idleness, cultivate job skills, and improve the rates of successful transition back into their communities after release, the PIE program created a cheap captive domestic labor market, which set the stage for the adoption and expansion of private-sector labor in public prisons. The PIE program also allowed prisons themselves to be privatized and operated as for-profit entities.

Meanwhile, incarceration rates began to soar. After a period of relative stability since 1925 (around 0.1 percent of the population), the overall U.S. imprisonment rate grew rapidly and continuously from 1972, increasing annually by 6 to 8 percent through 2000.

=== 1980s ===
President Ronald Reagan's 1986 Anti-Drug Abuse Act further accelerated mass incarceration. Very shortly many state prisons were experiencing unprecedented overcrowding. Rockefeller's successor, New York Governor Mario Cuomo, was unable to generate enough support to dismantle the drug laws, and to keep pace with increasing arrests, was forced to expand the prison system using the Urban Development Corporation, a public state agency, which could issue state bonds without voter support. Despite a general economic retrenchment and avowed state government austerity policies, these events proved that government funds could nevertheless be made available for prison construction.

Meanwhile, in 1983, the Corrections Corporation of America (CCA) was founded by Nashville businessmen who claimed they could build and operate state and federal prisons with the same quality of service provided by government prisons, but at a lower cost. In 1984, CCA was awarded a contract for a facility in Hamilton County, Tennessee, the first instance of the public sector contracting management of a prison to a private company. By 1987, the company had signed more contracts, with Tennessee, Texas, and Kentucky, establishing the legal precedent for other startups and established corporations to enter into the industry, not only operating prisons but also immigrant detention facilities for the U.S. Immigration and Naturalization Service. As of 2012, the multibillion-dollar corporation, now known as CoreCivic, manages over 65 correctional facilities and boasts an annual revenue exceeding $1.7 billion.

In 1988, the now-second-largest for-profit private prison corporation, Wackenhut Corrections Corporation (WCC) was established as a subsidiary of The Wackenhut Corporation. The WCC is now known as GEO Group, and as of 2017, their U.S. Corrections and Detention division manages 70 correctional and detention facilities.

Between 1980 and 1989, the total U.S. prison population increased by 115%, from 329,821 to 710,054 people.

=== 1990s ===
In 1992, William Barr, then United States Attorney General, authored a report, The Case for More Incarceration, which argued for an even further increase in the United States incarceration rate. In 1994, President Bill Clinton signed the Violent Crime Control and Law Enforcement Act, the largest crime bill in U.S. history, which directly allotted a $9.7 billion funding increase to prisons and introduced the three-strikes law, assigning unprecedentedly long sentences (25 year to life minimum) to third-time convicts.

As the prison population continued to grow steeply throughout the 1990s, the profit margins of private prison corporations such as CCA and GeoGroup continued to increase. Throughout the 1990s, the CCA and GeoGroup were both significant donors to the American Legislative Exchange Council. In 1995, Congress passed another piece of ALEC-influenced legislation, the Prison Industries Act, allowing corporations to pay prison laborers less than the federal minimum wage and divert the difference to constructing facilities for further prison labor.

By the end of 1999, the U.S. had a total incarcerated population of 2,026,596. This included 71,206 prisoners held in privately operated facilities, accounting for 5.5% of state and 2.8% of federal prisoners. In 1999, nearly 43% of all sentenced inmates were African-American men, and an estimated 9% of African-American men in their late 20s were in prison.

=== 2000s ===
Through the 2000s, the federal government continued outsourcing prison management to private facilities, while states varied in their approach to private incarceration. Between 1999 and 2010, six states began using private prisons, while nine states ended their private prison contracts. By 2010, the number of privately held state prisoners in the 30 practicing states ranged from a low of 5 in South Dakota to a high of 19,155 in Texas.

Overall U.S. incarceration (prisons and jails) peaked in 2008 at 2,308,400 people, approximately 1% of the adult population.

A 2010 investigation by the United States Department of Justice found that Federal Prison Industries (the New Deal–era public-sector prison labor program, rebranded in 1977 as UNICOR) had routinely exposed federal inmates to toxic heavy metals, exported hazardous wastes to developing countries, and attempted to conceal evidence of unsafe working conditions from OSHA inspectors.

=== 2010s ===
In 2016, President Barack Obama issued an executive policy to reduce the number of private federal prison contracts, and the United States Justice Department began developing a plan to phase out its use of private prisons. Deputy Attorney General Sally Yates rationalized this decision: "Private prisons simply do not provide the same level of correctional services, programs, and resources; they do not save substantially on costs; and as noted in a recent report by the Department's Office of Inspector General, they do not maintain the same level of safety and security."

Both GEO Group and CoreCivic donated heavily to the Donald Trump presidential campaign in 2016 and inaugural committee in 2017, and following his election, their stock prices skyrocketed: CoreCivic by 140% and GEO Group by 98%. Less than a month into the Trump administration, Attorney General Jeff Sessions rescinded the Obama directive curtailing the Federal Bureau of Prisons' private prison contracts, stating that the Obama administration had "impaired the Bureau's ability to meet the future needs of the federal correctional system."

By the end of 2019, the U.S. incarcerated population had dropped to 2,068,800 people, its lowest level since 2003. The incarceration rate had dropped to the same rate as 1995 (810 per 100,000 adult U.S. residents), with 11% of federal and 7.6% of state prisoners incarcerated in for-profit facilities.

=== 2020s ===
During 2020, following the murder of George Floyd and the resurgence of BLM, coupled with recognized disparities in how COVID-19 was affecting Black populations, discourse of abolition and critiques of the PIC resurged in the mainstream. Kurti and Brown argued, it even overtook reformist dialogue by imagining a social order without police or jails, which sought to protect and empower people. However, despite rising abolitionist and anti-PIC movements, the PIC continued to expand. By 2021, only just following the largest insurgencies of the movement, David Garland cites that 35 states were considering passing pro-police, anti-dissent bills. As of 2023, a report found that while the United States accounts for only 5% of the world's population, it is responsible for 25% of the prison population. Only a few years later, the Prison Policy Initiative 2026 report detailed that, through all forms of mass incarceration (meaning through state, federal, and local) almost 2 million people are incarcerated through "1,566 state prisons, 98 federal prisons, 3,116 local jails,1,277 juvenile correctional facilities, 220 immigration detention facilities, and 77 Indian country jails, as well as in military prisons, civil commitment centers, state psychiatric hospitals, and prisons in the U.S. territories." This part of the system alone, excluding other extensions of the PIC such as policing, costs at least $445 billion per year." Compared to 40 years ago, the 2 million estimates that there has been around a 500% increase in the number of people incarcerated. In the year 2026 alone, around 7.6 million people went to jail, with at least 500,000 people entering the prison system.

The primary conclusions of the 2026 Prison Policy study observed a steady population count since 2025, while other systems of detention, particularly youth and immigrant detention have spiked. For one, the number of people being detained by I.C.E. rose 58% (25,200 people) since 2025, with immigration detention centers expanding nationwide. The number of people held for immigration reasons, furthermore, grew by a 32% within the first year of Trump's second term. City, country and regional jails observed a 3% decrease in the number of people they locked up compared to 2024, a noticeable change from the high numbers that followed the end of COVID-19 lockdowns. However, this does not represent a decrease in the PIC, rather other forms of incarceration emerging as most prominent based on federal focus. In such cases, jails held almost 10 thousand more people for federal authorities in 2025, especially for I.C.E. and the U.S. Marshals Service. Furthermore, for a second year in a row (in comparison to almost two decades of decline) there has been an increase trend in youth confinement.

Amidst these continued trends of the PIC, prison labor abuse remains an expanding issue. In recent years, fewer people have been recorded as being held by local sheriff authority, yet are instead being held in 'rented' jails under federal authority. Additionally, a study conducted by the Civil Liberties Union in 2022 found that prison labor produces around $11 billion in yearly revenue. Of this $11 billion, $2 billion are profits from commodities, while the rest of $9 billion are produced by the services demanded of inmates.As of 2025, at least 4,100 companies have been reported using for-profit prison labor, with at least 66% incarcerated people recorded to experience forced or coercive prison labor. While this number is already significant, it is likely an underestimate due to common lack of transparency by involved parties regarding labor practices and supply chains.

==== AI and surveillance ====
New implications for the PIC continue to emerge with the rise of AI. For instance, the American Civil Liberties Union recently reported on the rise of Flock and their nation-wide mass surveillance project. Flock currently sells their cloud-connected cameras to police departments and private contractors, reading anywhere form license plates to recording people's daily movements and faces. This data can then be utilized by police to conduct nationwide searches of the database.

== Structure ==
The prison–industrial complex is an example of a complex system, comprising many institutions interacting in mutually reinforcing patterns. Minimal definitions of the system focus on the relationships between the federal and state criminal justice system; the for-profit companies that build, operate, and service public and private prisons; and the special interest groups that grow in size and influence as incarceration increases. These groups include ICE, police unions, correctional officers unions, and private probation companies, as well as private businesses that sell surveillance and corrections technology, operate prison food services and medical facilities, and private- and public-sector businesses that contract or subcontract prison labor.

More expansive definitions often include as elements of the system tough-on-crime politicians and district attorneys seeking office, conservative political lobbies and legislatures passing punitive laws, and investment banks and rural economic developers leveraging public debt into private profit through prison construction and employment contracts. The widest definitions of the prison–industrial complex include even larger and more abstract institutions and processes, such as the news media sensationalizing crime and influencing public perception, gentrification disrupting urban environments and displacing precarious residents, and public schools increasingly subjecting students to police oversight and legal punishment since the 1980s. In the U.S., the specific relationships between the criminal justice system and the private businesses that interact with it vary significantly from state to state.

Critics and scholars argue that mass incarceration is an emergent property of the prison–industrial complex. Because mass incarceration has exacerbated the economic and racial inequality in the United States, contemporary social critics like Ruth Wilson Gilmore refer to the prison–industrial complex as an infrastructure of racial capitalism.

=== The war on drugs ===
Marc Mauer, executive director of the criminal justice reform group The Sentencing Project, has argued that the growth and expansion of the prison–industrial complex since the 1970s has its roots in the war on drugs, which, rather than suppressing the illegal drug trade, has produced a perpetual cycle of drug dealing and imprisonment. This he attributes to a structural feature of the drug trade, a market with perpetually high demand and lucrative potential profits. Mauer describes the "replacement effect", in which no matter how many drug suppliers are incarcerated, other sellers simply take their place; since there is a constant supply of new drug sellers, there is thus a constant supply of potential prison inmates. According to this view, the prison–industrial complex depends on this guarantee of future inmates to ensure its growth and profitability, making prison construction, operation, services, and technology all safe investments.

Professor Angela Davis, one of the most recognized American prison abolition activists, has argued that while some appear to believe that the prison industrial complex is taking the space once filled by the military industrial complex, the aftermath of the war on terror shows how the links between the military, corporations, and government are growing even stronger. The relationship between these complexes, Davis suggests, shows they are symbiotic, because they mutually support and promote each other, even sharing some technologies. Further, they also share important structural features, both generating immense profits from processes of "social destruction" In essence, Davis argues that the relationship between the military and prison industrial complex can be understood like this: the exact things which are advantageous to corporations, elected officials, and governmental agents, those who have evident stakes in expanding these systems, leads to the devastation of poor and racialized communities as it has throughout American history.

=== Employment and recidivism ===
The U.S. criminal justice system has a high rate of recidivism. A 2021 Bureau of Justice Statistics investigation reported that about 66% of prisoners released across 24 states in 2008 were rearrested within 3 years, and 82% were rearrested within 10 years.

Statistics show that incarceration and unemployment are correlated, although unevenly. Nevertheless, such a high rate of recidivism can be attributed in part to the difficulty formerly incarcerated people encounter in finding stable employment. The Evidence-Based Professionals Society suggests two reasons for this difficulty: "First, most of the offenders may simply lack the necessary job skills for specific positions, keeping them from those usually higher paid and more stable jobs. Second, many employers are reluctant to hire these people due to the stigma imposed by their previous criminal records."

=== School-to-prison pipeline ===
Scholars and critics describe the existence of a "school-to-prison pipeline", a system in which public school policies contribute to funneling urban students of color into the prison–industrial complex. Students at urban schools and other schools with high percentages of minority students are more likely to experience out-of-school suspensions and academic failure, which have been correlated to a higher likelihood of incarceration after leaving school. Moreover, since the 1970s, urban public school districts have dramatically increased police presence in their schools, and students have been increasingly subject to "arrests for minor noncriminal violations of school rules." This trend has both disrupted urban learning environments and decreased the average age of the incarcerated population of the United States' major cities.

=== Race ===
The war on drugs has disproportionately impacted African Americans. Although African Americans use drugs at similar rates to Americans from other demographic groups, they are prosecuted at much higher rates.

== Economics ==
In the decades following World War II, the American domestic economy was characterized by growth, but also by deindustrialization, the decline of the labor movement, austerity and the privatization of government services, the transformation of welfare to workfare policies, and suburbanization, including white flight from city centers. These large-scale transformations had particularly damaging effects on the economic activity of large American cities, generally increasing urban unemployment and exacerbating income and racial inequality.

Statistics have shown that the unemployment rate is correlated to the incarceration rate, and American historians such as Heather Ann Thompson and Alex Lichtenstein have argued that mass incarceration has accompanied the public-sector abandonment of former urban industrial cores, and contributed to the rise of the Sun Belt as an important economic region. In this view, the prison–industrial complex is not simply the cumulative effect of decades of increasingly punitive legislation, but is an integral sector in the neoliberal national economy, with the largest and fastest-growing states—like Florida, California, and Texas ("Flocatex")—also leading the country in number of inmates and prison privatization.

=== Prison labor ===
As large-scale human holding facilities, prisons contain enormous reserves of labor power. Since the establishment of the Federal Prison Industries in 1930, these capacities have been put to work for the public sector, and since the 1979 Prison Industry Enhancement Certification Program, for the private sector too. Sociologist Erin Hatton defines four types of prison labor:

1. Facility maintenance jobs, in which prisoners do the upkeep and maintenance of their institutions: cooking, cleaning, laundry, landscaping, plumbing, etc. The vast majority of working prisoners perform this type of labor, earning no wages in many states, and anywhere between $0.04 and $2.00 an hour in the states where this labor is paid, averaging $0.14–$0.63 for most working inmates.
2. "Correctional industry" jobs in the government-run prison factories launched in the 1930s. These jobs account for nearly 5% of state and federal prisoner employment, with prisoners producing a wide range of goods and services for sale to other government agencies, including library, school, and office furniture; uniforms, linens, and mattresses for prisons; metal grills and wooden benches for public parks; body armor for the military and police; road signs and license plates for transportation departments; doing data entry and staffing call centers. In Texas, Georgia, and Arkansas, state prisoners earn no wages for such labor but, on average, state and federal prisoners earn $0.33–$1.41 an hour for this work, reaching as high as $5.15 in Nevada, where the pay starts at $0.25 an hour. Every U.S. state has its own correctional industries program, and the federal prison system has a similar initiative called UNICOR.
3. Jobs with private-sector companies that have contracted with prisons for their labor, as restarted in 1979 with the PIE program. These jobs employ just 0.3% of the prison population, and
  are the highest-paid prison jobs by far, because private-sector companies are legally obligated to pay prisoners “prevailing wages” in order to avoid undercutting non-prison labor. However, reports suggest that prisoners are typically paid the minimum wage, not the prevailing wage, and legal loopholes allow some companies to pay even less. Moreover, prisoners' wages are subject to [...] many deductions [...] capped at a whopping 80 percent of their gross earnings. Moreover, some states have mandatory savings programs that take away another chunk of their wages. Thus, for many incarcerated workers, even free-world wages in private-sector jobs are reduced so much that they begin to resemble prison-world wages.
  "Prison insourcing" has grown in popularity over the past few decades as a cheap alternative to offshoring and outsourcing, with a wide variety of companies actively hiring or subcontracting prison labor throughout the 1990s and 2000s.
4. Jobs outside of prisons and jails through various inmate labor programs. These work-release programs, outside work crews, and work camps are more common than public and private industry jobs, but less common than facility maintenance. This category of labor is various, with prisoners performing "community services" like cleaning parks, or clearing homeless encampments, or fighting wildfires in California. The Work Opportunity Tax Credit (WOTC) serves as a federal tax credit that grants employers $2,400 for every work-release employed inmate.

Advocates of prison labor argue that rehabilitation is promoted through discipline, a strong work ethic, and providing inmates with valuable skills to be used upon release. Gina Honeycutt, executive director of the National Correctional Industries Association, stated in 2015 that moreover, "in recent years, the focus of many work programs has shifted to concentrate even more on effective rehabilitation of inmates. The transition in the last five years has been away from producing a product to producing a successful offender as our product." Indeed, studies have shown that participants in prison labor programs often have a lower risk of recidivism; these studies may be misleading, however, as it is often only obedient and industrious inmates who are allowed to participate in prison labor in the first place.

Anti-prison activists have argued that corporations that contract or subcontract prison labor have a vested interest in the expansion of the prison system, since its expansion provides more inmates available for cheap labor. Activists Eve Goldberg and Linda Evans (writing while incarcerated in California) explain that

For private business, prison labor is like a pot of gold. No strikes. No union organizing. No health benefits, unemployment insurance, or workers' compensation to pay. No language barriers, as in foreign countries. New leviathan prisons are being built on thousands of eerie acres of factories inside the walls. Prisoners do data entry for Chevron, make telephone reservations for TWA, raise hogs, shovel manure, make circuit boards, limousines, waterbeds, and lingerie for Victoria's Secret—all at a fraction of the cost of 'free labor.'"

Several scholars argue that the practice of "hiring out prisoners", from the Reconstruction-era convict lease system to the contemporary prison–industrial complex, is a continuation of the U.S. history of slavery. These scholars all cite the Thirteenth Amendment to the Constitution of the United States, abolishing the institution of slavery "except as a punishment for crime whereof the party shall have been duly convicted."

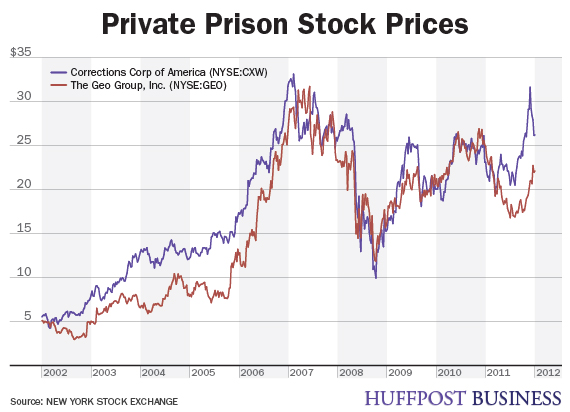
Private prison stock prices from 2002 to 2012

=== Private prisons ===
In a Bureau of Prisons (BOP)–funded study, privatized prisons were compared side-to-side with the public prisons on economic performance, and quality of life. The study found that in a trade-off for allowing prisons to be more cheaply run and operated, the degree to which prisoners are reformed goes down. Because the privatized prisons are so much larger than the public-run prisons, they were subject to economies of scale, allowing for a more efficient, lower-cost alternative to government spending on incarceration.

In 2016, GEO Group and CoreCivic each commanded $900 million in open credit from six banks: Bank of America, JPMorgan Chase, BNP Paribas, SunTrust, U.S. Bancorp, and Wells Fargo.

In 2011, The Vera Institute of Justice surveyed 40 state correction departments to gather data on what the true cost of prisons were. Their reports showed that most states had additional costs ranging from one percent to thirty-four percent outside of what their original budget was for that year.

John W. Whitehead, constitutional attorney and founder of the Rutherford Institute asserts that "Prison privatization simply encourages incarceration for the sake of profits, while causing millions of Americans, most of them minor, nonviolent criminals, to be handed over to corporations for lengthy prison sentences which do nothing to protect society or prevent recidivism." Whitehead argues that it characterizes an increasingly inverted justice system dependent upon an advancement in power and wealth of the corporate state.

Hadar Aviram, Professor of Law at UC Hastings, suggests that critics of the prison–industrial complex focus too much on private prisons. While Aviram shares their concerns that "private enterprises designed to directly benefit from human confinement and misery is profoundly unethical and problematic," she contends that "the profit incentives that brought private incarceration into existence, rather than private incarceration itself, are to blame for the PIC and its evils". In the neoliberal era, she argues, "private and public actors alike respond to market pressures and conduct their business, including correctional business, through a cost/benefit prism".

== Immigration–industrial complex ==
As of 2000, funding of the Immigration and Naturalization Service (INS) had been increasing as about a total of $4.27 billion was allotted to the INS in the 2000 fiscal budget. This was 8% more than in the 1999 fiscal budget. This expansion, experts claim, has been too rapid and thus has led to an increased chance on the part of faculty for negligence and abuse. Lucas Guttengag, director of the ACLU Immigrants' Rights Project stated that, "immigrants awaiting administrative hearings are being detained in conditions that would be unacceptable at prisons for criminal offenders." Such examples have included "travelers without visas" (TWOVs) being held in motels near airports nicknamed "Motel Kafkas" that are under the jurisdiction of private security officers who have no affiliation to the government, often denying them telephones or fresh air, and there are some cases where detainees have been shackled and sexually abused according to Guttengag. Similar conditions arose in the ESMOR detention center at Elizabeth, New Jersey where complaints arose in less than a year, despite having a "state-of-the-art" facility.

As of 2017, the number of unauthorized immigrants in the U.S. was 11.3 million. Those that argue against the PIC claim that effective immigration policy has failed to pass, since private detention centers profit from keeping undocumented immigrants detained. They also claim that despite having the incarceration rate grow "10 times what it was prior to 1970,... it has not made this country any safer." Since the September 11 attacks in 2001, the budget for Customs and Border Protection (CBP), and U.S. Immigration and Customs Enforcement (ICE), have nearly doubled from 2003 to 2008, with CBP's budget increasing from $5.8 billion to $10.1 billion and ICE from $3.2 billion to $5 billion and even so there has been no significant decrease in immigrant population. Wayne Cornelius, professor Emeritus of Political Science at UC San Diego, even argued that it is so ineffective that "92–97%" of immigrants who attempt to cross in illegally "keep trying until they succeed", and that such measures actually increase the risk and cost of travel, leading to longer stays and settlement in the US.

There are around 400,000 immigrant detainees per year, and 50% are housed in private facilities. In 2011, CCA's net worth was $1.4 billion and net income was $162 million. In this same year, The GEO Group had a net worth of $1.2 billion and net income of $78 million. As of 2012, CCA has over 75,000 inmates within 60 facilities and the GEO Group owns over 114 facilities. Over half of the prison industry's yearly revenue comes from immigrant detention centers. For some small communities in the Southwestern United States, these facilities serve as an integral part of the economy. According to Chris Kirkham in 2012, this constitutes part of a growing immigration industrial complex: "Companies dependent upon continued growth in the numbers of undocumented immigrants detained have exerted themselves in the nation's capital and in small, rural communities to create incentives that reinforce that growth." A study by the ACLU says that many are housed in inhumane conditions as many facilities operated by private companies are exempt from government oversight, and studies are made difficult as such facilities may not be covered by a Freedom of Information Act.

In 2009, University of Kansas professor Tanya Golash-Boza coined the term, "Immigration Industrial Complex", defining it as "the confluence of public and private sector interests in the criminalization of undocumented migration, immigration law enforcement, and the promotion of 'anti-illegal' rhetoric," in her paper "The Immigration Industrial Complex: Why We Enforce Immigration Policies Destined to Fail".

In 2009, congressional immigration detention policies required that ICE maintain 34,000 immigration detention beds daily. This immigration bed quota has steadily increased with each passing year, and as of 2017 costing ICE around $159 to detain one individual for one day.

In 2010, immigration detention policies implemented by ICE benefited the two major private prison corporations CCA and GeoGroup, increasing their share of immigrant detention beds by 13%. Compared to data from 2009, the percentage of ICE immigrant detention beds in the United States are owned and operated by private for-profit prison corporations has increased by 49%, with CCA and GeoGroup operating 8 out of 10 of the largest facilities. Although the combined revenues of CCA and GEO Group were about $4 billion in 2017 from private prison contracts, their number one customer was ICE.

In May 2025, the WSJ reported how the second Trump administration had already spent 50% more on immigration removals and detention than in 2024.

== Impact and response ==
=== Women ===
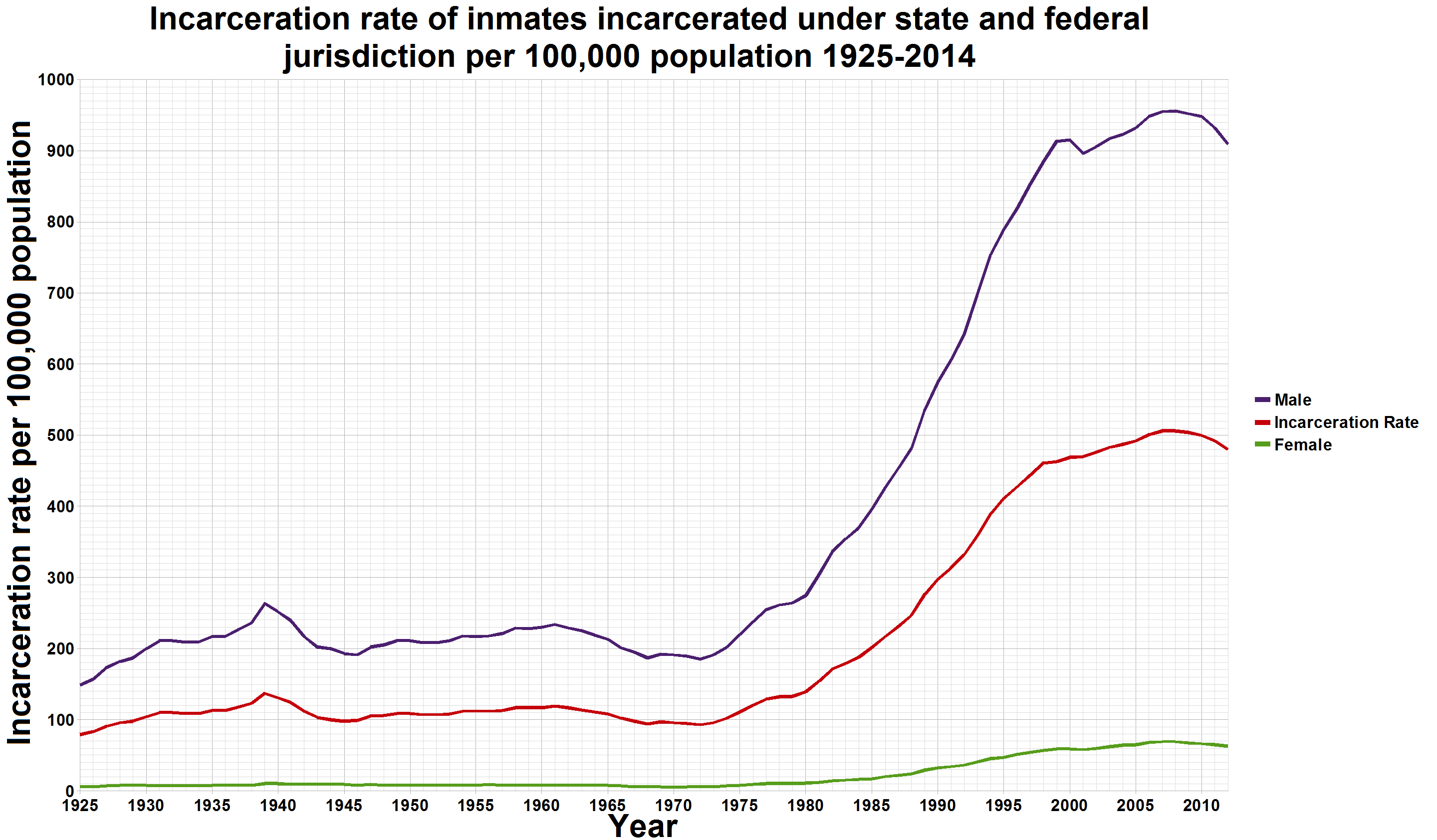
A graph of the US incarceration rate under state and federal jurisdiction per 100,000 population 1925–2008 (omits local jail inmates). The male incarceration rate (top line) is 15 times the female rate (bottom line).

In 1994, the UN Special Rapporteur on Violence Against Women was released which stated that "Among many other abuses women prisoners have identified, are pat searches (male guards pat searching and groping women), illegal strip searches (male guards observing strip searches of women), constant lewd comments and gestures, violations of their right to privacy (male guards watching women in showers and toilets), and in some instances, sexual assault and rape." International human rights standards reinforce this by stating "the rape of a woman in custody is an act of torture." In addition, some prisons fail to meet women's needs with providing basic hygiene and reproductive health products.

In regards to women and the prison–industrial complex, Angela Davis stated that "State-sanctioned punishment is informed by patriarchal structures and ideologies that have tended to produce historical assumptions of female criminality linked to ideas about the violation of social norms defining a 'woman’s place'. Considering the fact that as many as half of all women are assaulted by their husbands or partners combined with dramatically rising numbers of women sentenced to prison, it may be argued that women in general are subjected to a far greater magnitude of punishment than men." She also suggested that the "historical and philosophical connections between domestic violence and imprisonment [comprise] two modes of gendered punishment – one located in the private realm, the other in the public realm."

Davis continues:

the sexual abuse of women in prison is one of the most heinous state-sanctioned human rights violations within the United States today. Women prisoners represent one of the most disenfranchised and invisible adult populations in our society. The absolute power and control the state exercises over their lives both stems from and perpetuates the patriarchal and racist structures that, for centuries, have resulted in the social domination of women.

According to Davis and Cassandra Shaylor in their research entitled "Race, Gender, and the Prison-Industrial Complex", most women in prison experience some degree of depression or post-traumatic stress disorder. Very often they are neither diagnosed nor treated, with injurious consequences for their mental health in and out of prison. Many women report that when requesting counseling, they are offered psychotropic medications instead. As technologies of imprisonment become increasingly repressive and practices of isolation become increasingly routine, mentally ill women often are placed in solitary confinement, which can only exacerbate their condition.

Davis further explains why there is such an increase in female incarceration in the book, Are Prisons Obsolete?, in which Davis investigates the structures which the current prison system has formed around:

In most countries, the percentage of women among prison populations hovers around five percent. However, the economic and political shifts of the 1980s—the globalization of economic markets, the deindustrialization of the U.S. economy, the dismantling of such social service programs as Aid to Families of Dependent Children, and, of course, the prison construction boom—produced a significant acceleration in the rate of women's imprisonment both inside and outside the United States.

=== Minorities ===
US homicide victims by race, 1980–2008

US homicide convictions by race, 1980–2008

70 percent of the United States prison population is composed of racial minorities. Due to a variety of factors, different ethnic groups have different rates of offending, arrest, prosecution, conviction and incarceration. In terms of percentage of ethnic populations, in descending order, the U.S. incarcerates more Native Americans, African Americans, followed by Hispanics, Whites, and finally Asians. Native Americans are the largest group incarcerated per capita. It is worth noting that Black women are the fastest growing population of incarcerated people.

=== Response ===
A 2014 report by the American Friends Service Committee, Grassroots Leadership, and the Southern Center for Human Rights claims that recent reductions in the number of people incarcerated has pushed the prison industry into areas previously served by non-profit behavioral health and treatment-oriented agencies, referring to it as the "Treatment Industrial Complex", which "has the potential to ensnare more individuals, under increased levels of supervision and surveillance, for increasing lengths of time – in some cases, for the rest of a person's life." Sociologist Nancy A. Heitzeg and activist Kay Whitlock claim that contemporary bipartisan reforms being proposed "are predicated on privatization schemes, dominated by the anti-government right and neoliberal interests that more completely merge for-profit medical treatment and other human needs supports with the prison-industrial complex."

Sociologist Loïc Wacquant of UC Berkeley is also dismissive of the term for sounding too conspiratorial and for overstating its scope and effect. However Bernard Harcourt, Professor of Law at Columbia University, considers the term useful insofar as "it highlights the profitability of prison building and the employment boom associated with prison guard labor. There is no question that the prison expansion served the financial interests of large sectors of the economy."

Another writer of the era who covered the expanding prison population and attacked "the prison industrial complex" was Christian Parenti, who later disavowed the term before the publication of his book, Lockdown America (2000). "How, then, should the left critique the prison buildup?" asked The Nation in 1999:

Not, Parenti stresses, by making slippery usage of concepts like the 'prison–industrial complex'. Simply put, the scale of spending on prisons, though growing rapidly, will never match the military budget; nor will prisons produce anywhere near the same 'technological and industrial spin-off'.

Prisons in the U.S. are becoming the primary response to mental illness among poor people. The institutionalization of mentally ill people, historically, has been used more often against women than against men.

Other scholars, such as Nils Christie and Mechthild Nagel, have proposed alternative terms such as "criminal industrial complex" and "criminal (justice) industrial complex". Nagel argues the latter in particular "encompasses tentacles of punitive measures of which 'prison' is only one—albeit a severe one—of many forms of social control" and has justice in brackets as it "hides the permanent element of repression that is endemic in a system geared to overempower those who exert power and domination."

== Reform ==
=== Prison abolition movement ===
A response to the prison industrial complex is the prison abolition movement. The goal of prison abolition is to end the prison industrial complex by eliminating prisons. Prison abolitionists aim to do this by changing the socioeconomic conditions of the communities that are affected the most by the prison–industrial complex. Abolitionists propose reallocating funds to social programs such as education, mental healthcare, housing, and non-armed dispute forces. The purpose of abolition is not necessarily to dismantle, but to revise. Angela Davis, a known political activist and co-founder of Critical Resistance describes the purpose of abolition, "All of these things help to create security and safety. It’s about learning that safety, safeguarded by violence, is not really safety."

==== Alternatives to detention ====
Due to the overcrowding in prisons and detention centers by for-profit corporations, organizations such as Amnesty International, propose using alternatives such as reporting requirements, bonds, or the use of monitoring technologies. The questions often brought up with alternatives include whether they are effective or efficient. A study published by the Vera Institute attempts to answer this question by stating that when alternatives such as monitoring technologies were used, they found that 91% of the individuals appeared at their court date. The Institute recorded that the relative cost of using such alternatives has been estimated at $12 per day a relatively low price in comparison to the reported average cost of incarceration in the U.S., which has been priced at roughly $87.61 per day.

Despite the relative efficiency and effectiveness of alternative to detention, there is still much debate that these alternatives will not change the dynamics of incarceration. This argument lies in the fact that major corporations such as the GEO Group and Corrections Corporations of America will still be profiting by simply re-branding and moving towards rehabilitation services and monitoring technologies. Rather than effectively ending and finding a solution to the PIC, more people will simply find themselves imprisoned by another system. Other opposition to alternatives comes from the public. According to Ezzat Fattah, opposition towards prison alternatives and correctional facilities is due to the public fearing that having these facilities in their neighborhoods will threaten the security and integrity of their communities and children.

==== Critical Resistance ====
The movement gained momentum in 1997, when a group of prison abolition activists, scholars, and former prisoners collaborated to organize a three-day conference to examine the prison–industrial complex in the U.S. The founders of Critical Resistance include Angela Davis, Ruth Wilson Gilmore, and Rose Braz. The conference, Critical Resistance to the prison–industrial complex, was held in September 1998 at the University of California, Berkeley and was attended by over 3,500 people of diverse academic, socioeconomic and ethnic backgrounds. Two years after the conference, a political grassroots organization was founded bearing the same name with the mission to challenge and dismantle the prison–industrial complex.

In 2001, the organization adopted a national structure with local chapters in Portland, Los Angeles, Oakland, and New York City to develop campaigns and projects working towards abolishing the prison industrial complex. Currently, the cause has shifted towards supporting efforts towards resisting state repression and developing tools to re-imagine life without the prison industrial complex.

In 2010, at the U.S. Social Forum, committed activists joined together to discuss prison justice and stated that "Because we share a vision of justice and solidarity against confinement, control, and all forms of political repression, the prison industrial complex must be abolished." Following the forum, the rise of Formerly Incarcerated, Convicted People's Movement helped to incorporate abolition into other movements such as Occupy Wall Street, Black Lives Matter, and the Movement for Black Lives.

=== School-to-prison pipeline reform ===
A competing explanation for the disproportionate arrest and incarceration of people of color and persons with lower socioeconomic status is the school-to-prison pipeline, which generally proposes that practices in public schools (such as zero-tolerance policies, police in schools, and high-stakes testing) are direct causes of students dropping out of school and, subsequently, committing crimes that lead to their being arrested. 68% of state prisoners had not completed high school in 1997, including 70 percent of women state prisoners. Suspension, expulsion, and being held back during middle school years are the largest predictors of arrest for adolescent women. The school-to-prison pipeline disproportionately affects young black men with an overall incarceration risk that is six to eight times higher than young whites. Black male high school dropouts experienced a 60% risk of imprisonment as of 1999. There is a recent trend of authors describing the school-to-prison pipeline as feeding into the prison–industrial complex.

Since the shortcomings of zero-tolerance discipline have grown very clear, there has been a widespread movement to support reform across school districts and states. Growing research that shows suspensions, especially for minor infractions and misbehavior, are a flawed disciplinary response has encouraged many districts to adopt new disciplinary alternatives. In 2015, mayor of New York City Bill de Blasio joined with the Department of Education to address school discipline in a campaign to tweak the old policies. De Blasio also spearheaded a leadership team on school climate and discipline to take recommendations and craft the foundations for more substantive policy. The team released recommendations that work towards reducing the racial disparity in suspension and discussing the underlying root cause of disciplinary infractions through restorative justice.

== See also ==
- List of industrial complexes
- 13th (film)
- Convict lease
- Kids for cash scandal
- List of countries by incarceration rate
- United States incarceration rate
- List of U.S. states by incarceration rate
- Mentally ill people in United States jails and prisons
- Race in the United States criminal justice system
- Native Americans and the prison–industrial complex
- Abolition Feminism
