= Rizzo v. Goode =

- Supreme Court of the United States

Argued November 11, 1975 Decided January 21, 1976
- Full case name: Rizzo, Mayor of Philadelphia, et al. v. Goode, et al.
- Citations: 423 U.S. 362 (more) 96 S. Ct. 598; 46 L. Ed. 2d 561; 1976 U.S. LEXIS 42
- Argument: Oral argument
- Opinion announcement: Opinion announcement

Court membership
- Chief Justice Warren E. Burger Associate Justices William J. Brennan Jr. · Potter Stewart; Byron White · Thurgood Marshall; Harry Blackmun · Lewis F. Powell Jr. William Rehnquist · John P. Stevens

Case opinions
- Majority: Rehnquist, joined by Burger, Stewart, White, Powell
- Dissent: Blackmun, joined by Brennan, Marshall
- Stevens took no part in the consideration or decision of the case.

Rizzo v. Goode, 423 U.S. 362 (1976), is a United States Supreme Court case in which the Court held that a prophylactic injunction against non-culpable state executive officials was an overbroad interference by the Federal Courts in the state executive branches. In doing so, the court created a limit on the federal injunctive power in matters of state agency internal affairs.

== Background ==
The case arose from a District Court ruling requiring Philadelphia officials to implement a program for handling citizen complaints alleging police misconduct. The order originated from trials in 1970, where findings pointed to inadequate procedures for handling complaints about police behavior. Plaintiffs filed a § 1983 suit in the United States District Court for the Eastern District of Pennsylvania against a number of Philadelphia officials charging that the police department had engaged in a "pervasive pattern of illegal and unconstitutional mistreatment by police officers."

The district court identified a pattern of police misconduct against Philadelphia residents, minorities in particular, and all residents in general. Evidence was gathered from over 200 witnesses to support the court's fact-finding regarding multiple incidents of alleged misconduct. It was shown that the minimalist response to civilian complaints against specific officers (who were identified) had been ineffective at improving police behavior to prevent future misconduct.

John P. Fullam ordered the defendants, who were supervisors of the Philadelphia Police Department, to submit a "comprehensive program" for the Court's approval, in order to effectively deal with civilian complaints.

The district court findings were subsequently affirmed by the United States Court of Appeals for the Third Circuit, as was the decision that equitable relief was needed to prevent police misconduct.

City officials appealed the decision to the United States Supreme Court contending that the federal courts had infringed upon the authority granted to local governments to manage police conduct under state law.

== Supreme Court ==
In a 5-3 ruling, the Supreme Court reversed the Court of Appeal ruling, holding there is no liability under the Civil Rights Act of 1871 for police misconduct that occurs independently of "any policy or plan by petitioners—express or otherwise—showing their authorization or approval of such misconduct".

The Supreme Court cast the case as "a heated dispute between individual citizens and certain policemen ... [that] has evolved into an attempt by the federal judiciary to resolve a 'controversy' between the entire citizenry of Philadelphia and the petitioning elected and appointed officials over what steps might, in the Court of Appeals' words, '[appear] to have the potential for prevention of future police misconduct.'"

The court questioned whether there was a legitimate case or controversy - "express[ing] grave doubts about the justiciability" of the case - said that "the individual respondents' claim to 'real and immediate' injury rests not upon what the named petitioners might do to them in the future...but upon what one of a small, unnamed minority of policemen might do to them in the future because of that unknown policeman's perception of departmental disciplinary procedures. This hypothesis is even more attenuated than those allegations of future injury found insufficient in O'Shea to warrant invocation of federal jurisdiction. Thus, insofar as the individual respondents were concerned, we think they lacked [standing]."

Moreover, "appropriate consideration must be given to principles of federalism in determining the availability and scope of equitable relief," the court said; "[w]here, as here, the exercise of authority by state officials is attacked, federal courts must be constantly mindful of the "special delicacy of the adjustment to be preserved between federal equitable power and State administration of its own law." In such a setting, "principles of equity ... militate heavily against the grant of an injunction except in the most extraordinary circumstances." Justice Rehnquist (as he then was) explained that:

1. The District Court's reliance on a statistical pattern lacking a clear causal link could not be considered to be the same as Hague v. Committee for Industrial Organization, 307 U.S. 496 (1939) or Allee v. Medrano, 416 U.S. 802 (1974).
2. Equitable relief was not available, unlike in Swann v. Charlotte-Mecklenburg Board of Education, 402 U.S. 1 (1971), as the responsible authorities were not found to have played an affirmative part in depriving people of their constitutional rights.
3. Federalism considerations limit the scope of equitable relief especially involving the internal governance of state agencies like police departments.

== Aftermath ==
In 1978, the Supreme Court held in Monell v. Department of Social Services of the City of New York that Rizzo "decided that the mere right to control, without any control or direction having been exercised and without any failure to supervise, is not enough to support § 1983 liability." When read together, the two cases support the proposition that § 1983 supervisory liability cannot be based on respondeat superior.

Rizzo was cited in the Supreme Court case Pennhurst State School and Hospital v. Halderman, (1984), a significant case in United States constitutional law which held that state officials enjoy immunity from suit on the basis of state law claims in federal court. Rizzo's use of the doctrine of equitable restraint, (Note: originally formulated in Younger v. Harris, 401 U.S. 37 (1971)) as used in Pennhurst, has been questioned as to whether it can be justified.

== See also ==
- The Thin Blue Lie
