= Prisoner law =

In the United States of America, prisoner law refers to litigation that determines the freedoms that a prisoner either holds or loses when they are incarcerated. This includes the end of the hands-off doctrine and the ability to be protected by the first, fourth, eighth, and fourteenth amendments. Furthermore, prisoner laws regulate the ways in which individuals experience privacy in a prison setting. Important case laws have arisen through time that have either hindered or protected prisoners from certain rights. Some include the Hudson v. Palmer case which held that prisoners were not protected against searches and seizures of their prison cells and Wolff v. McDonnell that stated that prisoners shall remain entitled to some of their constitutional rights even after being incarcerated.

== Background ==
Incarceration rates in the United States have and continue to increase significantly. In comparison to the rest of the world, the United States holds a record for the highest number of incarcerated individuals. In 2015, the prison population was estimated at 2.2 million people. There has been a rapid increase in the prison population since the 1980s. However, violent crime has significantly decreased from the years 1973 to 2003. In the United States, the majority of inmates are people of color and from low socioeconomic backgrounds.

=== Historical ===
A theoretical form of prison surveillance is called the Panopticon. The Panopticon is a building composed of a middle tower for the surveillance of the surrounding cells. Jeremy Bentham's Panopticon makes it possible that “each individual in his place is securely confined to a cell from which he is seen from the front by the supervisor; but the side walls prevent him from coming into contact with his companions”. In America the first prison was established during the 1790s in Philadelphia which was named after the name Walnut street.

=== Hands-off doctrine ===
The hands-off doctrine was the decision of the federal courts to stay out of the regulating the administration of how prisons and rules for prisoners are decided. In essence this meant that if an inmates’ rights were said to be violated the court would not get in between. This stems from the idea that these corrections institutions knew more about how to make decisions over prisons and prisoners than the courts did. Also, judges believed that if a prisoner became incarcerated then they shall expect to lose their rights. Due to the complexity of the issues that have arisen among prisoners and their rights, the hands-off doctrine in the courts has diminished. This led to a greater awareness of the rights of prisoners as well as increased court involvement within the violation of rights. In fact, the detachment from using the "hands off" approach began during the 1960s and courts started to look into specific violations regarding prisoners. Some of the related cases begin with Procunier v. Martinez, which was the first case where the Supreme court began to interfere between the prisoner and prison administration relationship. This case revolved around controlling and censoring the correspondence of prisoners. A final decision over this issue was not made until the occurrence of the Turner v. Safley case. It concluded that the ability to send mail to and from other prisoners was not allowed in order to keep prisons safe and controlled. Moreover, it was decided that marriage between prisoners was to be allowed. In Coffin v. Reichard, the idea that prisoners have and should maintain their constitutional rights as human beings was acknowledged. However, becoming incarcerated does in fact take away from many of those constitutional rights. This led to a complexity of cases that decided what protections would be available to prisoners through incarceration.

== Prisoner case law – general ==
=== The First Amendment ===
Both the freedom of speech and the freedom of religion are protected by the First Amendment to the United States Constitution. For prisoners there have been an abundance of case laws that have emerged which protect these rights and the various violations they have faced within prison.

==== Freedom of speech ====
Prisoners have the freedom to send and receive correspondence and visitations from their loved ones. In some instances this right may be limited for the safety and security of the prison. Correspondence is largely monitored by the prison staff. The case Carothers v. Follette, portrays an instance where a prisoner wrote about the prison administration in his letters and was then penalized for it. As a result, the courts concluded that prisons may penalize prisoners for the way they express themselves only if it interferes with the functioning of the prison. In addition, prisons get to decide who is allowed to send prisoners mail and who they can send mail to by implementing a set mailing list. Prisoners are entitled to receive legal aid when needed. When it comes to communicating with their attorneys, prisoners are allowed to talk with them in person and without major surveillance. They also have the right to reach out to "petition for redress of grievances" which was decided in the case Nolan v. Fitzpatrick. This gave prisoners the right to be able to express their complaints and expose prison conditions to the outside world.

==== Freedom of religion ====
The courts respect the right to freedom of religion in prison, however, they focus largely on protecting this freedom of all prisoners equally. The growth of the conversion to the religion of Islam within prisons prompted litigation cases to arise. Prisoners may not be discriminated based on their religious beliefs but certain religious practices may be restricted in prison. The Brown v. Peyton, case revolved around the rights of Black Muslim prisoners in which they believed that their rights of freedom to practice religion were violated. Similarly, in Fulwood v. Clemmer, Black Muslin prisoners fought for their right to practice their religion in prison. It was ruled that because their practices disrupted the prison environment that they could be penalized for such practices. Walker v. Blackwell, is a case which fought for the needs of Muslim prisoners to eat at specific times due to their religious practice of Ramadan but were eventually denied. The courts decided that it was not cost efficient and also raised safety issues.

Despite the growth of conversions to Islam within prisons in the 1950s, states such as California, New York and Texas still had not yet recognized or accommodated the religious activity of Muslim inmates by the start of the 1960s. As the number incarcerated Muslims began to reach a critical mass, prisoners petitioned courts to advance their religious rights. The Hands-off Doctrine began to diminish during the 1960s as courts started to look into specific violations regarding prisoners. Cases involving Muslim prisoners began succeeding in gaining recognition for a variety of rights over the next several years, such as freedom from punishment due to religion, the right to hold religious services, the right to possess and wear religious medals, and the right to proselytize. New York's Department of Corrections offered to hire Muslim chaplains as department employees by 1975. These legal victories not only solidified Islam as a legitimate religion among corrections staff and prisoners, but also placed Muslim groups at the center of the prisoners' rights movement for obtaining constitutional rights for the incarcerated.

== Prisoner privacy law ==
=== The Fourth Amendment ===
As part of the constitution, the Fourth Amendment to the United States Constitution protects prisoners' privacy by forbidding “unreasonable searches and seizures” of individuals' property. There are a variety of cases that fought to protect this privacy right, yet there are many cases that attempted to take it away. For example, the case Lanza v. New York ruled that prisons and inmates would not be protected under the fourth amendment. Further, in Bell v Wolfish which had to do with searches and seizures it was decided that prisoners shall not expect to have any privacy in prison. Both of these cases ruled against the protection of prisoners themselves being search or their property from being confiscated. However, in Wolff v McDonnell the courts established that prisoners should still be entitled to some rights even if they have committed a crime. In addition, the 1975 Bonner v. Coughlin case also protects that these privacy rights remain available to individuals in prison, to an extent. Searches and seizures of inmates and their property in prison occur without any prior announcement. The function of this is to search for any unauthorized property that inmates may be hiding and are needed in order to prevent or get rid of unauthorized property. In the case Parrat v Taylor an inmate's property was destroyed by a member of the prison staff which was not ruled as a violation by the courts. Essentially, this decision supported the conclusion that prisons must prioritize their own security and well-being over the privacy rights of inmates. Moreover, in the 1984 Hudson v. Palmer case, the Supreme Court decided that the privacy rights of inmates against searches were not protected.The case stated that this was important in order to maintain control and security within the prisons. Additionally, the case Timm v. Gunter decided that searches and seizures were not in violation of an inmates rights if it was for the sake of the prison and its security. Similarly, the case Levoy v. Mills ruled that no matter how big the invasion of privacy, it must be rightfully justified for the prison's welfare in order to be held in the prisons favor.

=== The Eighth Amendment ===
The Eighth Amendment to the United States Constitution is a protection of individuals against "cruel and unusual punishment". When Prisoners are subjected to monitoring, observation and searches this amendment may be violated. Two cases that explore this further are Jackson v. Werner and Jordan v. Gardner. In Jackson v. Werner, the courts decided that there was no violation with searching and observing because it is all supposed to be for the good of a prison institution. It stated that inmates should get used to this due to the fact that they are within the boundaries of an institution that is meant to punish them. In Jordan v. Gardner, the courts made a decision based on the idea that inmates may have had previously experienced sexual abuse or harassment. The decision was oriented towards preventing more trauma for inmates and ruled that searches and observations may cause an "infliction of pain". Additionally, in the case, Estelle v. Gamble, a situation occurred in which the right to health care was not given to a prisoner and had his health conditions worsen. This led to a conclusion that decisions like these could lead to worsening conditions of prisoners, and violates the eighth amendment because this denial could further cause a cruel and unusual punishment.

=== The Fourteenth Amendment ===
The Fourteenth Amendment to the United States Constitution protects individuals' privacy and one instance is being "observed by strangers naked or stripped of [their] clothes" Due to the way that prisons function these privacy rights may not be protected by the fourteenth amendment. Female guards employed within male prisons have the right to walk around areas in which men may be naked or using the restrooms. Along with being able to monitor these areas they are also allowed to search the men if needed. This also occurs with female prisons within where men are employed. According to a report from the Human Rights Watch, male corrections officers have abused their right to search prisoners. This includes the harassment and sexual abuse of female prisoners. Consequently, officers have threatened female inmates to engage in sexual activity with them. In court, prisoners may be subjected to prove that they have been wrongly harassed and that their privacy has been breached in order to be protected.

== Privacy in the prison setting ==
Prisoner privacy within a prison setting includes the ways that prisoners experience privacy through communicating with others, their physical prison environments and the protection of their health.

=== Communication methods ===
Most inmates have methods available to them to communicate with individuals outside of prison. These methods include access to sending and receiving mail, telephone calls, and visitation rights. Writing letters is a popular way in which inmates maintain contact with the outside world. Letters are a way for both inmates and their family members to communicate with each other via mail. All of the mail that enters or leaves the facility is read and gone through by the prison staff and guards. Similarly, telephone calls are accessible to most inmates except those who are placed in solitary confinement. The allowed duration of the calls tend to be approximately fifteen minutes long. Phone calls are monitored and recorded; there are also key words that may cause the disconnection of calls by guards, for example: profanity. Inmates have the option to receive visits from family members and friends. These visitations vary from three to six hours in length and are consistently monitored by prison guards. Aside from being monitored by guards there are an abundance of cameras in the visitation rooms for surveillance of these interactions. All physical interactions are strictly limited. Aside from their encounter being monitored family members undergo searches upon entering the facility for visitations. These visits "can be humiliating and degrading" for the visitor.

=== Physical environments ===
In prison the physical environments that prisoners are exposed to are becoming more overcrowded through time. However, aside from dealing with overcrowded spaces they face a privacy concern regarding corrections officers. Corrections officers risk losing their jobs or not attaining a job at all within prisons of the opposite sex in order to maintain the privacy of inmates. When privacy of inmates is protected by disallowing guards to wander private areas those areas become more dangerous to the inmates. On the other hand, if those areas are monitored than inmates may lose their sense of privacy. In order to secure the privacy of inmates, oftentimes individuals of the opposite sex are denied employment in prisons. This occurred in the case Dothard v. Rawlison where a female was discriminated against when applying to a male prison in the state of Alabama. The supreme court focused on arguing that females are sexually susceptible in a male environment. This was justified by the idea that if a female was to work in a male prison that prisoners would become more violent. In Bowling v. Enimoto male inmate rights were challenged by deciding that these inmates have the right not to be monitored while either showering, changing or using the restroom. Similarly, in Forts v. Ward females' inmate rights were challenged.The case ruled that there was a need to block surveillance of areas such as showers and toilets.

=== Health ===
The case Estelle v. Gamble ruled that inmates have the right to receive health care in prison. It also established that if prisoners want to get an abortion that they are entitled to do so. The Health Insurance Portability and Accountability Act (HIPAA) privacy rule applies to health care in prison. HIPAA's privacy rule protects everything pertaining to a prisoners health. However, under HIPAA's Permissible Use and Disclosure Exception it is okay for prisons to share inmate's information with other institutions when needed and without their approval. There are various ways that privacy is breached in terms of the health of inmates and these breaches form barriers for access to healthcare. First, a variety of blood tests can be conducted on prisoners at any moment for any reason and is not protected by the fourth amendment. A lack of trust drives prisoners to feel uncomfortable when voicing health issues to the guards. Also, overcrowding in prisons has led to the spread of health related issues and diseases. The National Commission on Correctional Health Care (NCCHC) has disclosed that the transmission of diseases and other health related issues is high in prisons and can spread further after an inmate is released Diseases that can be transmitted are constantly monitored. Also, this is immediately communicated to public health officials.

Some examples of these health issues and disease are:

- HIV/AIDS
- Hepatitis
- Tuberculosis

== Controversies ==
=== Observations, searches of inmates, and gender ===
Controversy exists with gender in prison as a double standard. In one instance if same gender observations or searches are conducted then it is stated to be required in order to keep prisons safe and secure. On the other hand, if this occurs with opposite genders then a violation of prisoner rights arises. It is more likely to become a violation or an intrusion if these observation and searches take place on behalf of the opposite sex. Oftentimes, the decisions of federal judges are shaped by different stereotypes that characterize men and women. Because of this, according to the courts, females have a higher expectation of privacy than males do.

=== Conflict between prisoners and correctional officers ===
In the Civil Rights Act of 1964, Title VII protects the employment rights of workers against any discrimination pertaining to who they are or where they come from. However, there is a debate between inmates' privacy rights versus corrections officers' and equal employment rights. Complaints come from prisoners because they believe that their privacy is breached by guards of the opposite sex. Contrarily, guards complain that they are being discriminated against when it comes to obtaining a job within an institution of the opposite sex. An example of a violation of the equal employment rights is shown in Brooks v. Industries. This is seen mainly with cross-gender searches. In the case, Brooks v. Industries, a female janitor working in a male prison lost her position due to gender in prison issues. The decision concluded that having to clean a male bathroom should not be done by a female because it would invade the male privacy. Conflicts like these lead to a call to balance the two situations in the best way possible.

== See also ==
- Foreign languages in prisons
