= Andrea Armstrong (lawyer) =

American lawyer and legal scholar

- Born: 1976 or 1977

Academic background
- Education: New York University (B.A.); Princeton University (M.P.A.); Yale University (J.D.)

Academic work
- Discipline: Legal studies
- Sub-discipline: Incarceration law
- Institutions: Loyola University New Orleans College of Law

Andrea Armstrong (born 1976 or 1977) is an American legal scholar writing on the topic of incarceration law. She is the Dr. Norman C. Francis Distinguished Professor of Law at the Loyola University New Orleans College of Law. In 2023, she was named a MacArthur Fellow.

== Biography ==
Armstrong graduated from New York University in 1996, receiving a B.A. She then received an M.P.A. from Princeton School of Public and International Affairs in 2001. In 2007, she received a J.D. from Yale Law School. Following her law school graduation, she was a clerk for Helen G. Berrigan, a district judge for the United States District Court for the Eastern District of Louisiana.
