= Turnerize =

Turnerize, Turnerized, Turnerization, and related words can refer to the following:

- Film colorization, named after Ted Turner, an early proponent of the process
- The changes in the rights of prisoners in the United States after the United States Supreme Court case Turner v. Safley, 482 U.S. 78 (1987)
- A synonym for Yellow journalism
