= Jones v. North Carolina Prisoners' Labor Union =

- Supreme Court of the United States

Argued April 19, 1977 Decided June 23, 1977
- Full case name: Jones, Secretary, Department of Correction of North Carolina, et al. v. North Carolina Prisoners' Labor Union, Inc.
- Citations: 433 U.S. 119 (more) 97 S. Ct. 2532; 53 L. Ed. 2d 629; 1977 U.S. LEXIS 136; 81 Lab. Cas. (CCH) ¶ 13,281

Case history
- Prior: Appeal from the United States District Court for the Eastern District of North Carolina

Holding
- Prison inmates do not have a right under the First Amendment to join labor unions.

Court membership
- Chief Justice Warren E. Burger Associate Justices William J. Brennan Jr. · Potter Stewart; Byron White · Thurgood Marshall; Harry Blackmun · Lewis F. Powell Jr. William Rehnquist · John P. Stevens

Case opinions
- Majority: Rehnquist, joined by Burger, Stewart, White, Blackmun, Powell
- Concurrence: Burger
- Concur/dissent: Stevens
- Dissent: Marshall, joined by Brennan

Jones v. North Carolina Prisoners' Labor Union, 433 U.S. 119 (1977), was a United States Supreme Court case where the court held that prison inmates do not have a right under the First Amendment to join labor unions.

== Background ==
=== Constitutional Rights for Prisoners ===
The First Amendment in the United States Constitution states Congress shall make no law respecting an establishment of religion, or prohibiting the free exercise thereof; or abridging the freedom of speech, or of the press; or the right of the people peaceably to assemble, and to petition the Government for a redress of grievances. However, this right to free speech can be dismissed in the name of public order and national security.

In 1871, the Virginia Supreme Court held in Ruffin v. Commonwealth that prisoners were "slaves of the State". This affirmed a general sentiment at the time that the courts would not intervene in the administration of penal institutions. Prisoners were compelled to what the state chose to accord them, and forfeited their absolute freedom. However, in 1941, in Ex parte Hull, prisoners were granted the right of access to the court. This meant their right to habeas corpus could not be infringed. Following the ruling, prisoners could challenge infringements of other protected rights in the Constitution. While prisoners continued to be subject to the state's will, administrators still were under protection of the "hands-off" doctrine. This doctrine stated that the federal government would not intervene in constitutional restrictions, as long as they were inside state institutions. In the 1960s the courts began to look into specific cases that may have violated prisoners' rights. One example is the later case of Turner v Safley in 1987. In this case, it was determined that mail inside of prisons should continue to be controlled. This meant prisons could overrule prisoners' constitutional rights if the reasons were "reasonably related" to penological interests.

=== Appellee Prisoners' Labor Union ===
The Appellee Prisoners' Labor Union was formed in 1974. The stated goal of the organization was to promote charitable labor through the union and to form labor unions at every prison and jail in North Carolina to seek better working conditions. This meant altering or eliminating practices and policies of the Department of Correction which it did not approve of. By early 1975, there were around 2,000 inmates in 40 different prison institutions throughout North Carolina.

However, the State of North Carolina did not approve of this development and decided to try and eliminate unions among these prisoners. The state was in favor of individual members within the union but sought to eliminate mail, solicitation, and meetings. On March 26, 1975, activities of solicitation and group membership were banned.

A week before the date on which this ruling was to go into effect, the Union filed a suit in the United States District Court for the Eastern District of North Carolina on March 18, 1975. This claim was that their rights of the First Amendment, including free speech, association, and assembly activities were being stepped on.

=== Arguments presented ===
The Prisoners' Labor Union of Appellee argued that their First Amendment and Equal Protection rights were violated by regulations in the North Carolina Department of Correction. These regulations did not allow prisoners to join the labor union, or solicit other prisoners to join, and they also didn't allow union meetings. Jacob L. Safron, Special Deputy Attorney General of North Carolina, was the attorney for the case of the appellants. The briefing was done with Rufus L. Edmisten.

The prison administration claimed that they believed the existence of a Union would significantly threaten and cause a higher burden on the discipline and control of prison administrators. Through the creation of unions, they believed that inmates would use the organization to slow work, cause stoppages, and other unwanted problems. Norman B. Smith was the attorney for the case of the appellees. The briefing was done with Deborah Mailman.

=== Ruling of the district court ===
The district court concluded that there was no consensus on whether or not an association of inmates was necessarily good or bad. Their statement was, "We are unable to perceive why it is necessary or essential to security and order in the prisons to forbid solicitation of membership in a union permitted by the authorities. This is not a case of a riot. There is not one scintilla of evidence to suggest that the union has been utilized to disrupt the operation of the penal institutions."

Following the ruling of the district court, it was decided that they did not give proper deference to the decisions of prison administrators. While looking at the argument, the natural laws of protection for officials inside prisons were overlooked. People against the ruling stated that it was only natural that prison administrators would have to impose limits on constitutional rights, including those from the First Amendment.

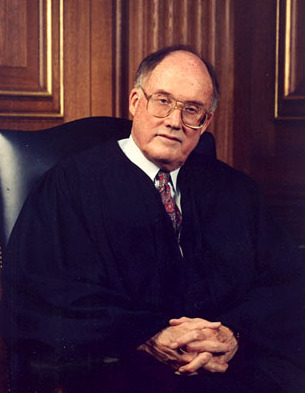
Mr. Justice Rehnquist gave the decision from the court

== Supreme Court decision ==
The Court's decision was given on June 23, 1977. This ruling was given by Supreme Court Justice William Rehnquist. The Supreme Court sided with the administrators of the prison. The final ruling was 7–2. The reasons given were as follows:

- The regulations of the prison that were brought before the court did not violate the First Amendment. The presented argument agreed upon was that there needs to be limits on constitutional rights outside of prison walls while inside the penal institution.
- Prohibitions on solicitation between inmates do not abridge the free speech rights of an inmate. Prison officials are entitled to control organized activity within the confines of a prison. These rules are both "reasonable and necessary".

== Future implications ==
The conclusion that the presence of a prisoners' union would be detrimental has not been conclusively shown to be false. However, since the ruling, there have been many arguments made in favor of overturning the ruling. Additionally, arguments were made to justify maintaining the rule.

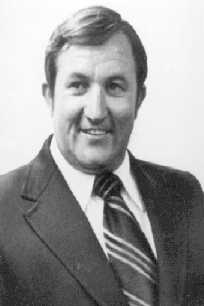
David L. Jones, Secretary of North Carolina Correction, 1973-1977

=== Arguments in favor ===
- A major reason for the lack of recognition of prisoners' unions is that they often do not represent the population of the inmates, nor do they often succeed at improving staff-inmate communication. Many times, these inmate unions are seen as a show to please onlookers and the inmates inside these unions are those favored by the prisons' staff. Furthermore, the actions these unions take are often subjugated to get vetoed and do little for the inmates themselves. The ruling of Jones will not significantly affect the right of many inmates, because a majority already does not get involved. Rather, the security interests at hand far outweigh the possibility of a few minor constitutional infringements, that can be civilly addressed within the institution.

=== Arguments against the decision ===
- Prior to the ruling of Jones, prisoners' rights had been balanced with the administrative needs accordingly and fairly. However, after the ruling, recent trends in the reform of prisons will drop. Allowing administrators all the power will not give the prisoners themselves a fair opportunity to access their rights. The constitutional rights of men will be relegated to a concern of security to men who do not get paid in reform, but rather control.
- Prior to the ruling and after, the argument has been made that the state of United States prisons are not built for health reform. A majority of prisons' communication could be beneficial to the inmates, as well as an environment that fosters positivity and better treatment. In a time when many inmates were receiving and needing to accept roles to speak out against these injustices, they are being silenced. The lack of solicitation among inmates will remove opportunities from those who would benefit the most. Furthermore, allowing communication and civil discourse would lessen the chances of violent prison revolts.
- Many argue that due to the ruling in the Jones case, the Court will be continuing a more "hands-off" approach. The final ruling was in favor of prison administrators, and their need to place security in the prisons they operate. By placing the power firmly into their hands, it will subjugate a majority of further rulings into the category of necessary to preserve safety.

== Impact and legacy ==
Since the decision of the Jones v. North Carolina Prisoners' Labor Union case, there currently are talks about how much the court can intervene with the operations of the prison system, mostly with how much the correctional officers inside the prison can intervene with the First Amendment rights of the prisoners. In Goodwin v. Oswald, the Second Circuit Court looked at a case of a warden withholding mail from an inmate and decided that based on the Sixth Amendment and the Fourteenth Amendment, it was determined that the withholding of mail from an inmate was unjustifiable and unconstitutional under the mentioned amendments. It is important not to view the impact of the prisoners' rights movement in too narrow of a view. From a sociopolitical standpoint, it is important to recognize that the prisoners' movement is built on the backs of a minoritized group. Similarly to other movements like Civil Rights or Feminist movement, it is very a difficult and strenuous process for groups of prisoners to speak out.

Over the course of the 1970s, 11,195 prisoners' rights petitions were filed in federal courts. This marked a 451% increase from 1970. While many of these cases are done without representation for the prisoners, those cases that do go further are supported by a more highly skilled group of lawyers. The ACLU's National Prison Project has been the main catalyst for prison litigation experience.

== See also ==
- First Amendment
- Prison labor
- United States Supreme Court
- Prisoners' rights
- Turner v. Safley
- Wolff v. McDonnell
