= Zablocki v. Redhail =

- Supreme Court of the United States

Argued October 4, 1977 Decided January 18, 1978
- Full case name: Thomas E. Zablocki, Milwaukee County Clerk v. Roger G. Redhail
- Citations: 434 U.S. 374 (more) 98 S. Ct. 673; 54 L. Ed. 2d 618; 1978 U.S. LEXIS 57; 24 Fed. R. Serv. 2d (Callaghan) 1313
- Argument: Oral argument

Case history
- Prior: Judgment in favor of plaintiffs, 418 F. Supp. 1061 (E.D. Wis. 1976) (three-judge court); probable jurisdiction noted, 429 U.S. 1089 (1977).

Holding
- Wisconsin's statute requiring a noncustodial parent to obtain a court order before receiving a marriage license, which may be issued only when the noncustodial parent is up to date on child support and such child(ren) is(are) not likely to become public charges, is unconstitutional because the statute violates the Fourteenth Amendment's equal protection clause. The case also reaffirms the status of marriage as a fundamental right.

Court membership
- Chief Justice Warren E. Burger Associate Justices William J. Brennan Jr. · Potter Stewart; Byron White · Thurgood Marshall; Harry Blackmun · Lewis F. Powell Jr. William Rehnquist · John P. Stevens

Case opinions
- Majority: Marshall, joined by Burger, Brennan, White, Blackmun
- Concurrence: Burger
- Concurrence: Stewart
- Concurrence: Powell
- Concurrence: Stevens
- Dissent: Rehnquist

Laws applied
- U.S. Const. amend. XIV

Zablocki v. Redhail, 434 U.S. 374 (1978), was a U.S. Supreme Court decision that held that Wisconsin Statutes §§ 245.10 (1), (4), (5) (1973) violated the Fourteenth Amendment Equal Protection Clause. Section 245.10 required noncustodial parents who were Wisconsin residents attempting to marry inside or outside of Wisconsin to seek a court order prior to receiving a marriage license. In order to receive such a court order, the noncustodial parent could not be in arrears on his or her child support, and the court had to believe that the child(ren) would not become dependent on the State.

== History ==
In 1972, Roger Redhail, then in high school, was sued in a paternity action in Milwaukee County, Wisconsin. He admitted he was the father, and the court ordered him to pay child support in the amount of $109 per month until the child reached eighteen years of age, plus court costs. Since Redhail was in high school at the time, he had no way to pay the court costs or child support. It went in arrears, reaching a total of $3,732 by the end of 1974. Meanwhile, Redhail's noncustodial child was a public charge, and received $109 per month as support from the State of Wisconsin.

In 1974, Redhail attempted to obtain a marriage license in Milwaukee County. Due to the aforementioned § 245.10(1), one of the agents of the county clerk denied his application because he did not have a court order allowing him to marry. Redhail proceeded to file a class action suit against Thomas Zablocki, who was the county clerk of Milwaukee County (and whose official capacity was to issue such licenses) under 42 U.S.C. § 1983, and since the action sought a permanent injunction against the statute, 28 U.S.C. § 2281 (since repealed) then required a three-judge District Court.

Judge John Reynolds wrote for the three-judge court. After disposing with issues regarding interactions with State court actions and class action procedure, he reached the substantive matter under which Redhail filed suit. Finding that the Wisconsin statute created two separate classes of individuals, Reynolds then proceeded to observe that under a number of Supreme Court decisions, marriage was held to be a fundamental right. Accordingly, the judge applied strict scrutiny to determine whether the Wisconsin statute could survive constitutional review.

Examining the State's interest in the matter, Reynolds found that while Wisconsin surely had a legitimate interest in counseling, that interest was not perceived as a compelling interest. While he found that the State's interest in child welfare was potentially compelling, that interest was insufficient because the Wisconsin statute was not connected to the restriction imposed by the statute. As the Wisconsin law could not withstand strict scrutiny, Reynolds declared the law unconstitutional.

== Supreme Court Review ==
When federal suits proceed in three-judge District Courts, 28 U.S.C. § 1253 allows parties to appeal directly to the Supreme Court. Accordingly, the Supreme Court noted probable jurisdiction, 429 U.S. 1089 (1977). The case was argued early in the October term of 1977, and the judgment was issued in January 1978.

=== Majority Opinion ===
Justice Marshall wrote for the 5 justice majority court holding. Affirming the judgment of the District Court, Marshall concurred with the District Court's reading of marriage being a fundamental right, relying on Loving v. Virginia (1967) and Griswold v. Connecticut (1965). Marshall, however, diverged from the District Court's analysis by refusing to apply strict scrutiny. Instead, he determined if Wisconsin's law was "supported by sufficiently important state interests and is closely tailored to effectuate only those interests". Marshall's standard is similar to strict scrutiny as his "closely tailored" is similar to the strict scrutiny standard of requiring a statute to be narrowly tailored to the interest, but it requires only an "important state interest", which is akin to intermediate scrutiny.

Applying this standard, Marshall examined the same two justifications that the District Court confronted—child welfare and counseling noncustodial parents about their obligations. These justifications are defeated because as Marshall explained, Wisconsin could find other ways to achieve the interest without resorting to infringement of a fundamental right, and that the latter reason is defective because it fails to achieve the objectives it sets out to meet (which is one of the necessities of being narrowly tailored). Accordingly, Marshall affirmed the District Court by focusing the lack of connection and efficacy of the measures Wisconsin advances, rather than confronting the importance of Wisconsin's interests.

=== Concurring Opinions ===
Three of the Justices wrote concurring opinions. Chief Justice Warren Burger was part of the majority opinion but wrote a separate one as well. Justices Stewart and Powell each wrote their own concurrence agreeing with the judgment of the court.

==== Burger's Concurrence ====
Chief Justice Burger joined with Justice Marshall's opinion, and concurred separately to note that the Wisconsin statute was an "intentional and substantial interference with the right to marry", distinguishing this case from Califano v. Jobst (1977).

==== Stewart's Concurrence in the Judgment ====
Justice Stewart reaches a conclusion nearly identical to the Court's conclusion, but wholly rejects the Court's equal protection analysis, likening it to be the improper analysis for the denial of a right. Stewart disagrees with the majority's contention that there is a fundamental right to marry, or even an explicit right to marry at all. Rather, he grounds his analysis in the liberty interest of the Fourteenth Amendment due process clause. Reasoning that lacking money is not an acceptable reason to restrict a person's liberty, he concludes that the traditions of the United States forbid such a restriction, and that the proper justification for holding the law to be unconstitutional is substantive due process.

==== Powell's Concurrence in the Judgment ====
Justice Powell concurs in the judgment in a similar manner to Justice Stewart. Powell's primary concern is that the near-application of strict scrutiny and the use of the equal protection clause is too strong and interferes with the legitimate regulation of the State on marriage. Similar to Justice Stewart, Powell would use the due process clause, but invoke it in a way that would be flexible enough to allow the State to pass reasonable regulations (regulations that probably would not be upheld under Marshall's standard).

==== Stevens's Concurrence in the Judgment ====
Justice Stevens's concurrence in the judgment is different from the other two because he wishes to distinguish between different kinds of classifications. Stevens states that "[a] classification based on marital status is fundamentally different from a classification which determines who may lawfully enter into the marriage relationship." In making this distinction, Stevens wishes to separate Zablocki and Loving from Califano v. Jobst. The intent of his opinion is to illustrate that distinctions between married and unmarried people are largely acceptable, whereas bars to marriage itself should be treated with skepticism. Further, he too concludes that the methods of Wisconsin's law fall far short of achieving its objectives (reasoning through multiple claims that Wisconsin's desired outcome does not comport with the reality of the situation).

=== Rehnquist's Dissent ===
Justice Rehnquist was the only justice to dissent completely from the ruling of the court. Agreeing with Justice Powell, Rehnquist concludes that there is no fundamental right to marriage. Further he would conclude that the appropriate measure for this case is the rational basis test—that the law need be only rationally related to a legitimate State interest. Rehnquist contended that the appropriate frame of analysis for the Court should be one that is deferential to the concerns of the legislature. The key to this viewpoint is the realization that Wisconsin "'adopted this rule in the course of constructing a complex social welfare system that necessarily deals with the intimacies of family life'"—that Wisconsin made a "permissible exercise of [its] power" even though its results may not be as intended.

Rehnquist also disagreed that Redhail had standing to bring his claim. Examining the record of the District Court and of oral arguments, he finds that it was never verified that Redhail could not pay for his child support obligations. With this argument, the Justice notes that Redhail may not be an acceptable member of his class and thus might not have been able to bring the challenge that he brought. However Rehnquist notes that because he finds the law to be valid, there is no need to reach the question of standing.

== Subsequent implications ==
Zablocki has been cited as precedent and is now considered to be part of a constitutional fundamental right to marry, along with cases like Loving v. Virginia, Turner v. Safley, and Obergefell v. Hodges, the Court has declared a fundamental right to marriage under the Fourteenth Amendment.

== See also ==
- List of United States Supreme Court cases, volume 434
