= Native Americans and the prison–industrial complex =

Social issue in the United States

The prison–industrial complex is the rapid expansion of US inmates and prisons in favor of private prison companies and businesses that profit from the services needed in the construction and maintaining of prisons. The businesses benefit and profit from cheap prison labor, food services, medical services, surveillance technology, and construction. The financial incentive of building prisons encourages incarceration and affects people of color at disproportionately high rates. Native Americans are the largest group per capita in the US prison system and are more likely to be affected by police violence than any other racial group.

== Incarceration statistics ==
According to the Bureau of Justice Statistics, Native Americans are incarcerated at a rate that is 38% higher than the national average. In 19 states, they are more overrepresented in the prison population compared to any other race and ethnicity. Between 2010 and 2015, the number of Native Americans incarcerated in federal prisons increased by 27%. In Alaska, data published by the 2010 US Census revealed that 38% of incarcerated people are American Indian or Alaskan Native despite the fact that they make up only 15% of the total population. In Hawaii, Native Hawaiians make up 24% of the general population but account for 39% of the incarcerated population, according to the Office of Hawaiian Affairs. Native youth are highly impacted by the US prison system, despite accounting for 1% of the national youth population, 70% of youth taken into federal prison are Native American. Native American men are admitted to prison at four times the rate of white men, and Native American women are admitted at 6 times the rate of white women.

== Effects of US intervention on tribal governments ==
Tribal governments have much more limited jurisdiction compared to federal justice systems and US state systems. The Major Crimes Act in 1885, Public Law 280 in 1953, The Indian Civil Rights Act of 1968 and the case law of Oliphant v. Suquamish Indian Tribe in 1978 are some of the first historic laws among many passed by the United States government to gain federal control over native nations. This has caused the crime on Native reservations to often be prosecuted under federal law, which entails more severe sentencing than state law for the same crime. Non-native criminals including sexual predators and drug traffickers have taken advantage of the unclear chain of authority on Native lands. This disjuncture between federal government jurisdiction and tribal government jurisdiction allows non-native criminals to avoid punishment while Native members are subjected to sexual and drug-related violence.

== Police violence against Native Americans ==
Police brutality against Native Americans contributes greatly to the rising incarceration rates and deaths of Native people. While Native Americans only make up 1.2% of the total population in the US, Natives experience higher rates of death due to police violence than any other racial group. Native Americans are 3 times more likely than white Americans to be killed by police.

== Advocacy ==
=== Native Lives Matter ===
The "Native Lives Matter" campaign is a grassroots group advocating for awareness and justice for missing and murdered Indigenous women and Native lives killed by police violence. The campaign was established in 2014 by Akicita Sunka-Wakan Ska from the Cheyenne River and Standing Rock Sioux Tribes and JR Bobick from St. Paul, Minnesota. This campaign uses social media like Facebook and Twitter to spread awareness about issues affecting the Native population, such as police brutality, high incarceration, and missing murdered indigenous women. The campaign believes ways to lessen and end police brutality and high incarceration rates include hiring a police force that better represents Native communities. They believe that this would allow more cultural understanding and lead to less racial profiling against tribal nations by police enforcement. Native Lives Matter also believes that cultural healing programs could address and eventually lessen police brutality by fostering an understanding of mental health, addiction, and poverty which contribute to high police presence.
