= Superintendent v. Hill =

- Supreme Court of the United States

Argued March 25, 1985 Decided June 17, 1985
- Full case name: Superintendent, Massachusetts Correctional Institution at Walpole v. Hill et al.
- Citations: 472 U.S. 445 (more) 105 S. Ct. 2768; 86 L. Ed. 2d 356

Case history
- Prior: Decision in favor of the prisoners by the Massachusetts Supreme Judicial Court, 466 N.E.2d 818 (Mass. 1984); cert. granted, 469 U.S. 1016 (1984).

Holding
- Due process requires that a decision to revoke good-time credits earned by prisoners must be supported by "some evidence".

Court membership
- Chief Justice Warren E. Burger Associate Justices William J. Brennan Jr. · Byron White; Thurgood Marshall · Harry Blackmun; Lewis F. Powell Jr. · William Rehnquist; John P. Stevens · Sandra Day O'Connor

Case opinions
- Majority: O'Connor, joined by Burger, White, Blackmun, Powell, Rehnquist
- Concur/dissent: Stevens, joined by Brennan, Marshall

Laws applied
- U.S. Const. amend. XIV

Superintendent v. Hill, 472 U.S. 445 (1985), was a United States Supreme Court case in which the Court held that due process required that prison disciplinary decisions to revoke good-time credits must be supported by "some evidence."

== Background ==
Hill and Crawford were inmates at Massachusetts Correctional Institution - Cedar Junction, a state prison in Walpole, Massachusetts. After being involved in a fight with a third inmate, they were charged with assaulting that inmate, in violation of prison rules. At separate hearings, Sergeant Maguire testified about the events he witnessed that suggested Hill and Crawford were involved in the fight. Hill and Crawford declared their innocence, and the victim gave statements that Hill and Crawford did not cause his injuries.

The prison disciplinary board found Hill and Crawford guilty of violating prison rules. It took away 100 days of good-time credit and gave them 15 days' solitary confinement. Hill and Crawford appealed to the prison superintendent, but the superintendent denied their appeal. They then filed a complaint in Massachusetts Superior Court, claiming that the board's actions violated their constitutional rights because there was "no evidence to confirm that the incident took place nor was there any evidence to state that if the incident took place [Hill and Crawford] were involved". The Superior Court concluded that there was no constitutionally sufficient evidence to support the board's finding, and ordered the prison system to void the disciplinary orders and restore Hill's and Crawford's good-time credits.

The Massachusetts Supreme Judicial Court affirmed. The accumulation of good-time credits was a liberty interest protected by the Due Process Clause of the Fourteenth Amendment, which required judicial review of the board's findings. The court agreed that there was not even "some evidence" to support the board's findings that Hill and Crawford were responsible for the assault. The Commonwealth of Massachusetts asked the U.S. Supreme Court to review the decision, and it agreed to do so.

== Opinion of the Court ==
Justice O'Connor wrote for the majority. The Commonwealth first contended that due process did not require judicial review of the prison board's decision. The Court explained that because Massachusetts law afforded judicial review of decisions of the prison board, and there was no indication that that judicial review did not extend to federal constitutional claims, there was no need to decide whether the Due Process Clause of the Fourteenth Amendment required judicial review of the prison board's decisions in the event that state law did not so provide.

The Commonwealth also did not challenge the Supreme Judicial Court's holding that Massachusetts law gave rise to a liberty interest in good-time credits that was protected by the Due Process Clause. Instead, the Commonwealth challenged the court's holding that due process required the board's decision to be supported by "some evidence", rather than simply that the board's action not be "arbitrary and capricious". The Court therefore proceeded on the assumption that there was, in fact, a liberty interest in the accumulation of good-time credits, and turned to the "nature of the constitutionally required procedures".

In Wolff v. McDonnell, 418 U.S. 539 (1974), the Court had held that when a prison disciplinary hearing might result in the loss of good-time credits, due process required that the prison notify the prisoner in advance of the hearing, afford him an opportunity to call witnesses and present documentary evidence in his defense, and furnish him with a written statement of the evidence relied on and the reason for the disciplinary action. The Court reasoned that an "inmate has a strong interest in assuring that the loss of good time credits is not imposed arbitrarily", and simply requiring "a modicum of evidence to support a decision to revoke good time credits will help to prevent arbitrary deprivations without threatening institutional interests or imposing undue administrative burdens". "Some evidence" simply means that there is "evidence in the record that could support the conclusion reached by the disciplinary board".

The Court then held that the "some evidence" standard had been satisfied in this case. The guard's testimony that, "upon investigating [the incident, he] discovered an inmate who evidently had just been assaulted" and "saw three inmates walking away", was sufficient to satisfy the "some evidence" standard. This was so even though there was no direct evidence to suggest that either Hill or Crawford were the ones who had assaulted the victim. Nevertheless, the Court concluded that "the record is not so devoid of evidence that the findings of the disciplinary board were without support or otherwise arbitrary".
