= The Thin Blue Lie =

2000 television film by Roger Young

- Written by: Daniel Helfgott
- Directed by: Roger Young
- Starring: Rob Morrow; Randy Quaid; Paul Sorvino
- Music by: Patrick Williams
- Country of origin: United States
- Original language: English

Production
- Executive producers: Daniel Helfgott; Janet Turner; Roger Young
- Producer: Fritzi Horstman
- Cinematography: Donald M. Morgan
- Editor: Benjamin A. Weissman
- Running time: 97 minutes
- Production companies: Helfgott-Turner Productions; Paramount Network Television; Showtime Networks

Original release
- Network: Showtime
- Release: August 13, 2000

The Thin Blue Lie is a 2000 television film directed by Roger Young and starring Rob Morrow, Randy Quaid, and Paul Sorvino. It was released on August 13, 2000 on Showtime. The title is a reference to the phrase "thin blue line" used to describe the hypothetical role of law enforcement as the line between order and chaos.

== Plot ==
The premise of the film concerns Philadelphia Inquirer reporter Jonathan Neumann (Rob Morrow), who, along with his partner Phil Chadway (Randy Quaid), won the Pulitzer Prize in 1978 for a series of articles exposing Philadelphia mayor Frank Rizzo (Paul Sorvino) and the Philadelphia Police Department for corruption. According to the articles, suspects were beaten and tortured in interrogation rooms in an effort to meet the high quota of criminal cases solved by Philadelphia detectives. Neumann and Chadway met extreme opposition from the police department, working amidst phone tappings, apartment ransackings, and threats of death and bodily harm.

== Cast ==
- Rob Morrow as Jonathan Neumann
- Randy Quaid as Phil Chadway
- Paul Sorvino as Frank Rizzo
- Cynthia Preston as Kate Johnson
- G.W. Bailey as K.C.
- Al Waxman as Art Zugler
- Beau Starr as Detective Marshall
- Barry Wiggins as Detective King
- Chuck Shamata as Vinnie
- Louis Di Bianco as Deep Nightstick
- Melissa DiMarco as Sandra Durano
- Bruce McFee as Detective Harris
- Joe Pingue as Detective Regossi
- Philip Granger as John Reilly
- Hayley Tyson as Sharon Chadway
- Patrick Patterson as Chief Inspector Golden
- Christian Potenza as Danny O'Brien
- Richard Clarkin as Scala
- Ryan Rajendra Black as Alberto
- Joanne Boland
- Michael Copeman as Jack Reynolds
- Jason Jones as Prosecutor
- Kelsa Kinsly as Reporter
- Chantal Lonergan as Chelsea
- Mayumi Rinas Mrs. Gonzalez
- Juan Carlos Velis as Miguel Gonzalez
- Scott Walker as Fire Chief

== Issues pertaining to journalism ethics ==
Throughout the movie, Neumann faced a number of ethical dilemmas. First, most of his colleagues did not think that he should pursue claims of torture from suspects; the city's crime level was at an all-time low, and some people felt that to question Rizzo's police policies would put the city's safety in jeopardy. Second, when interviewing victims of police brutality, Neumann had to assure the frightened victims that they would not be harmed by talking to him, when in fact, they had been threatened by police and warned against talking to and/or cooperating with reporters. Third, Neumann had to find one detective willing to essentially betray his fellow officers in order to substantiate his claims.

== See also ==
- Rizzo v. Goode
- Use of torture by police in the United States
