= Police brutality against Native Americans =

Police brutality is defined as the use of excessive force by law enforcement personnel while performing their official duties in an abusive and unjustified manner. Police brutality can also include psychological harm through the use of intimidation tactics beyond the scope of officially sanctioned police procedure.

Native Americans ages 20–24, 25–34, and 35–44 are three of the five groups most likely to be killed by police. Mortality data collected by the Centers for Disease Control and Prevention (between 1999 and 2011) shows that Native Americans comprise 0.8 percent of the United States population and account for 1.9 percent of police killings, making them 3.1 times more likely to be killed by police than white Americans and 2.6 times more likely to be killed by police than Black Americans.

== Potential causes and corresponding issues ==
=== Mental illness and law enforcement ===
According to the US Department of Health and Human Services, there are disproportionately high rates of substance use and mental health disorders in Native communities. Indigenous people have the highest rates of suicide of any minority group within the US and higher rates of post-traumatic stress disorder. Native people report experiencing serious psychological distress 2.5 times more than the general population. Increased exposure to police brutality is associated with unmet need for mental health care and assistance. In the Treatment Advocacy Center’s report titled “Overlooked in the Undercounted: The Role of Mental Illness in Fatal Law Enforcement Encounters,” researchers concluded Americans with untreated mental illness are sixteen times more likely to be killed during a police encounter than other civilians stopped by law enforcement. Authors of the study advocate for the formation of special task forces separate from law enforcement to de-escalate mental health crises: “Reducing encounters between on-duty law enforcement and individuals with the most severe psychiatric diseases may represent the single most immediate, practical strategy for reducing fatal police shootings in the United States.”

=== Border towns ===
According to the report “Discrimination Against Native Americans in Border Towns, a Briefing Before the United States Commission on Civil Rights” indigenous people are especially victimized by police forces in what are known as “border towns”. These areas are towns located near or next to Native Land Reservations, such as Flagstaff, Arizona; Gallup, New Mexico; Rapid City, South Dakota; Cortez, Colorado; Fairbanks, Alaska and other communities across the country. Former Navajo Nation President Russell Begaye spoke on racial profiling as a cause for the violence and discrimination Natives face from police forces in border towns, saying "Our people have the right to be free from unreasonable violence when they visit our neighboring communities, particularly from off-reservation law enforcement."

=== Incarceration of Native Americans ===
According to the Bureau of Justice, Native Americans are incarcerated at a rate 38% higher than the national average. Native American men are admitted to prison at 4 times the rate of white men, and Native American women are admitted at 6 times the rate of white women. Native American youth make up 70% of minors committed to the Federal Bureau Prisons, despite making up 1% of the United States youth, and Native American juveniles are transferred to the adult system at 18.1 times the rate of white juveniles.

== Specific cases ==
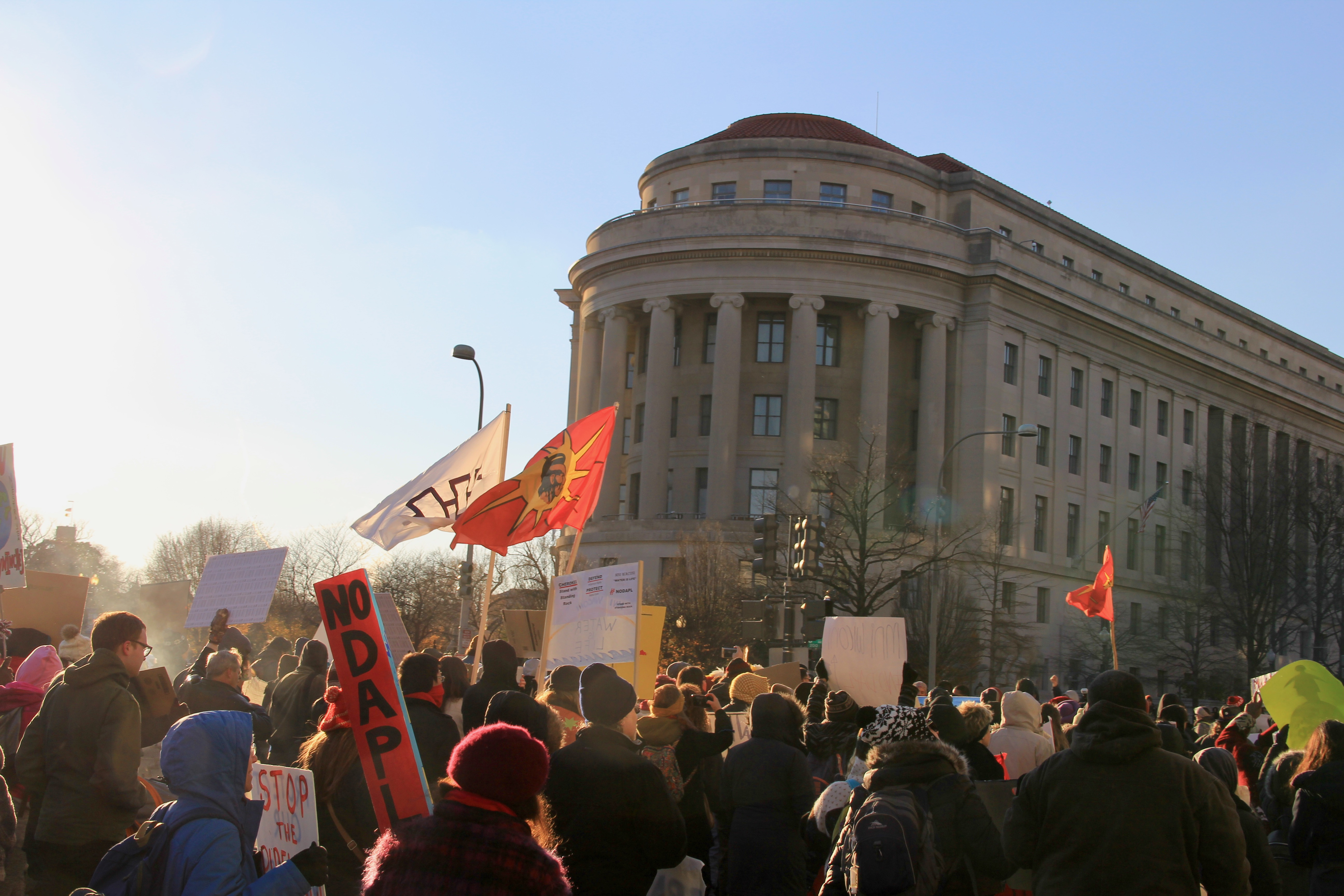
Marchers in Washington, D.C., holding No DAPL (Dakota Access Pipeline) signs.

=== Individuals ===
In January 1994, two Native American men were arrested by Minneapolis police and then placed in the trunk of a squad car. One man sustained injuries when the trunk was closed on his leg. Both men filed a lawsuit against the city of Minneapolis and each received $100,000.

On November 15, 1997, a Native American man was arrested for public intoxication and then handcuffed, sprayed with a chemical irritant, and verbally assaulted by two Minneapolis officers. The man was then driven to the city line and left in the snow, with only a light jacket. The man received a settlement of $92,500 after filing a police brutality lawsuit.

In April 2000, complaints were filed with the Bureau of Indian affairs accusing the Wagner, South Dakota Police Chief of using excessive force in the arrest of a Native American woman. The chief allegedly threw the woman to the ground and yanked her up by the cuffs, cutting her wrists. The chief was not indicted and the case was closed in November 2000.

On June 29, 2002, 20-year-old Joseph Finley Jr., who was Cherokee and Seminole, was shot fourteen times by a Cleveland police officer. The officer was off-duty at the time of the shooting and an excessive force lawsuit was filed. While the officer was not indicted, Finley's father received a settlement of $35,000 from the state.

On March 27, 2016, a Navajo woman, Loreal Tsingine, was shot in Winslow, Arizona, by a police officer. The officer was responding to a report of shoplifting and when Tsingine threatened him with scissors, he shot her five times. Tsingine's family filed a notice of claim against the city, alleging that the city ignored warning signs that the officer involved was a threat, due to a history of police misconduct. The officer responsible resigned in October 2016.

=== Standing Rock ===
On November 20, 2016, members of the Oceti Šakowiŋ tribe and allies were protesting the construction of the Dakota Access Pipeline near the Standing Rock Sioux Reservation. A lawsuit was filed against Morton County; Morton County's Sheriff; the city of Mandan, North Dakota; Mandan's Police Chief; Stutsman County; and Stutsman County's Sheriff, alleging that an unjustified violent attack took place against peaceful protesters. The legal collective representing the Native Americans alleges that the use of "Specialty Impact Munitions, explosive blast grenades, other chemical agent devices, and water cannons and water hoses in freezing temperatures" is excessive force. Numerous protesters were injured, resulting in the hospitalization of over two dozen individuals. In January 2017, militarized officers used tear gas and rubber bullets against unarmed protestors. United Nations Special Rapporteur Maini Kiai told the United Nations that the detention of the protestors was inhumane because of over-crowding and no access to medical care.

=== Lack of media attention ===
In April 2016, Claremont Graduate University researchers Roger Chin, Jean Schroedel, and Lily Rowen presented a paper reviewing newspaper articles which reported fatal police encounters between May 1, 2014, and October 31, 2015. Of the twenty-nine Native Americans killed by police between May 2014 and October 2015, only one victim received sustained coverage in the U.S. newspapers. In a special report which analyzed the researchers’ data, journalist Stephanie Woodward wrote that the “killings of Native people go almost entirely unreported by mainstream U.S. media.”

== Federal acknowledgment ==
In June 2023, after a two-year investigation launched by Attorney General Merrick Garland after the 2020 murder of George Floyd, the US Department of Justice determined the Minneapolis Police Department (MPD) discriminates against Black people and Native Americans in routine police stops. Assistant Attorney General for civil rights Kristen Clarke asserted the DOJ’s investigation was “the first time we have made a finding that the police department unlawfully discriminates by using force after stops against Black and Native American people.” As a historical first in the country, the DOJ found the MPD “recklessly, routinely uses excessive force, is inadequately trained and rarely held accountable for misconduct,” and uses abusive force on Native Americans at a significantly higher rate than during stops of white people for similar behaviors and offenses.

On November 15, 2021, President Joe Biden signed Executive Order 14053 entitled “Improving Public Safety and Criminal Justice for Native Americans and Addressing the Crisis of Missing or Murdered Indigenous People.” The Biden administration intended for the order to help combat disproportionate rates of violent crime and sexual and gender based violence perpetrated against indigenous people in the United States, as well as to support the development of “comprehensive law enforcement, prevention, intervention, and support services,” on Native land reservations. Tribal police forces and indigenous justice systems have had a complex relationship with federal, state, and local law enforcement groups regarding debates over tribal jurisdiction versus federal jurisdiction over crimes committed on Native reservations.

== AIM Patrol ==
With the Indian Relocation Act of 1956, thousands of Native Americans migrated to urban centers like Chicago, St. Louis, Tulsa, and Minneapolis. As a result of the urban relocation of indigenous people, Native Americans were exposed to police brutality within United States cities.

When the American Indian Movement (AIM) was founded in Minneapolis, Minnesota in July 1968, one of the group’s main goals was to combat police brutality against Native Americans in urban areas. On August 23, 1968, the AIM sponsored Indian Patrol was founded in Minneapolis, and worked as a citizens' patrol to improve relations between the city’s police and urban-Natives. Native Americans were arrested at a disproportionately high rate for public intoxication and other nonviolent offenses, which led to Patrol members meeting police at the point of arrest and convincing officers to release the Natives into their custody. The project began as a foot patrol with about twenty men, women and teenagers walking up and down main streets in Native neighborhoods within Minneapolis. Patrollers carried walkie-talkies and watched police squad car activity, occasionally broke up fights, and primarily arranged for drunk Native Americans to be taken home safely; they did not seek to enforce laws. Prior to the Patrol’s formation, roughly five to six arrests of Native people were reported each day. Five weeks after the Indian Patrol’s creation, however, AIM leaders claimed zero Native people had been arrested since their monitoring of police behavior. By decreasing interaction between police officers and Native community members, patrollers offered themselves as a de-escalating force and alternative solution.

Some Minneapolis police officers felt positively about the patrol, though they believed its formation to be unnecessary, as they perceived Native Americans taking steps to better their community as a positive social change. Patrollers felt great mistrust for the police, however, as they perceived public-intoxication arrests as a form of racial discrimination against indigenous people, as white people who drank in wealthy neighborhoods were not arrested at nearly the same rate for committing the same offenses. By 1970, the Indian Patrol slowly came to a close as AIM focused its involvement and organizational efforts on other activities.

== Advocacy ==
Advocacy groups such as the Lakota People's Law Project and National Indigenous Women's Research Center dedicate and allocate resources to specifically combat violence and police brutality against Native Americans.

=== Native Lives Matter ===
The Native Lives Matter campaign was established in 2014 by Akicita Sunka-Wakan Ska (Troy Amlee) from the Cheyenne River and Standing Rock Sioux Tribes and JR Bobick from St. Paul, Minnesota. The goal of the campaign is to bring social issues affecting Native Americans, such as police brutality, poverty, and mental health, into a national dialogue and rally for social justice reform. The campaign uses social media platforms Facebook and Twitter to spread news about social justice issues Native Americans are facing as well as to build a community.

According to the movement, ways to lessen and eventually cease police brutality against Native Americans include hiring a police force that better represents its service population in counties with a dense Native American population. This would allow for more cultural understanding and address racial issues that lead to police brutality. Cultural healing programs would also lessen police brutality by addressing issues such as mental health, addiction, and poverty, as these things contribute to the high crime rates of reservations and police presence. These programs would require a reallocation of government resources.

== See also ==
- Native Americans and the prison–industrial complex
- Police brutality in the United States
  - Police use of deadly force in the United States
- Police brutality against Indigenous Canadians
- Saskatoon freezing deaths
- Indian country jurisdiction
- Indian tribal police
