= California Bankers Ass'n v. Shultz =

- Supreme Court of the United States

Argued January 16, 1974 Decided April 1, 1974
- Full case name: California Bankers Association v. George Shultz, Secretary of the Treasury, et al.
- Citations: 416 U.S. 21 (more) 94 S. Ct. 1494; 39 L. Ed. 2d 812

Case history
- Prior: Stark v. Connally, 347 F. Supp. 1242 (N.D. Cal. 1972); probable jurisdiction noted, 414 U.S. 816 (1973).

Holding
- The record-keeping and reporting requirements of Bank Secrecy Act do not violate the First, Fourth, and Fifth Amendments of the US Constitution.

Court membership
- Chief Justice Warren E. Burger Associate Justices William O. Douglas · William J. Brennan Jr. Potter Stewart · Byron White; Thurgood Marshall · Harry Blackmun; Lewis F. Powell Jr. · William Rehnquist

Case opinions
- Majority: Rehnquist, joined by Burger, Stewart, White, Blackmun, Powell
- Concurrence: Powell, joined by Blackmun
- Dissent: Douglas, joined by Brennan (parts I and II-A only)
- Dissent: Brennan
- Dissent: Marshall

Laws applied
- Bank Secrecy Act

California Bankers Ass'n v. Shultz, 416 U.S. 21 (1974), was a U.S. Supreme Court case in which the Court held that the Bank Secrecy Act, passed by Congress in 1970 requiring banks to record all transactions and report certain domestic and foreign transactions of high-dollar amounts to the United States Treasury, did not violate the First, Fourth, and Fifth Amendments of the U.S. Constitution.

== Background ==
The Bank Secrecy Act of 1970 was passed as Congress had come to recognize that bank records had a high value in criminal investigations and regulatory actions from both domestic and foreign sources. The Act at passage had two key titles: Title I requiring banks to record all bank transactions and Title II to report certain events triggered by these transactions to appropriate government authorities, such as domestic transactions that totaled more than US$10,000 within a single day or the transfer of funding in or out of the United States exceeding US$5,000.

After the Act was passed and the processes used to enforce it were established by the United States Department of the Treasury, several groups sought to challenge the Act on several constitutional counts and filed suit in the United States District Court for the Northern District of California around June 1972, requesting a restraining order from implementation of the Act. The groups included bank customers, the Security National Bank, the California Bankers Association, and the American Civil Liberties Union. Their primary complaint identified that the record keeping and reporting requirements of the Act violated Fourth Amendment protections against unreasonable search and seizure; other complaints included challenges based on the First, Fifth, Ninth, Tenth, and Fourteenth Amendments.

The District Court granted the order while it reviewed the case. Ultimately, the three-judge panel ruled that nearly all of the Act was constitutional, but it found that the Title II reporting requirements on domestic transactions represented an unconstitutional violation of Fourth Amendment protection since it could allow the Treasury to obtain under subpoena all bank records of a person.

== Supreme Court ==
Both the plaintiffs and the government filed appeals on the mixed conclusion from the District Court to the Supreme Court. The Court opted to combine the three separate petitions into a single case:

- The California Bankers Association, which represented banks operating in California, argued that the Title I record-keeping requirements violated the Due Process Clause of the Fifth Amendment, as it placed an unreasonable expectation on the banks, and that this also violated the rights of privacy offered by the First Amendment.
- The Security National Bank, the ACLU, and the various bank customers asserts, in addition to the California Bankers Association, that the Title II reporting requirements related to foreign transactions violated the First and Fourth Amendments, as well as creating compulsory self-incrimination against the Fifth Amendment.
- The United States Government appealed on the constitutionality of the Title II reporting requirements for domestic transactions, arguing that the Court should have reviewed the Treasury's process for any Fourth Amendment violations, and not the Act itself.

Oral hearings were given on January 26, 1974. The Court issued its opinion on April 1, 1974. Justice William Rehnquist delivered the majority opinion, which was joined by Justices Burger, Stewart, White, Blackmun, and Powell. The decision ruled across ten points from the three petitions but effectively found that neither the recordkeeping requirements of Title I nor the reporting requirements of Title II of the Act violated First, Fourth, or Fifth Amendment rights or due process rights under the Fifth and Fourteenth Amendments.

The decision affirming the constitutionality of the law also expressed concern that some of the parties, such as the bank customers, the California Bankers Association, and the ACLU, did not show any direct harm from the Act and so lacked Article III standing to challenge the law. Justice Powell wrote a concurring opinion, joined by Justice Blackmun, which affirmed that having a reasonably-high amount, US$10,000, requiring recording and reporting did not violate privacy rights, but he expressed concern that more government intrusion into bank records could impact privacy rights.

Justice Douglas wrote a dissenting opinion. He was joined in part by Justice Brennan on points related on his opinion that the California Bankers Association had standing in the case and that there were significant privacy rights that could be violated by having banks record every transaction of their customers, which the government could have the capability to pull. Justice Douglas concluded that "the grant of authority by Congress to the Secretary of the Treasury is too broad to pass constitutional muster."

Justice Brennan also wrote a dissenting opinion, further expressing on Justice Douglas' opinion about the Act giving Secretary of the Treasure excessive powers that would invade privacy rights. Justice Marshall wrote another dissenting opinion that stated Katz v. United States allowed the records to be kept by banks under the Act to be seen as an intangible extension of a person's private property and so the Act violated the Fourth Amendment.
