= List of United States Supreme Court cases, volume 416 =

This is a list of all the United States Supreme Court cases from volume 416 of the United States Reports:

Case name	Citation	Date decided
Village of Belle Terre v. Boraas	416 U.S. 1	1974
California Bankers Ass'n v. Shultz	416 U.S. 21	1974
Mahon v. Stowers	416 U.S. 100	1974
Super Tire Eng'g Co. v. McCorkle	416 U.S. 115	1974
Scheuer v. Rhodes	416 U.S. 232	1974
Shea v. Vialpando	416 U.S. 251	1974
NLRB v. Bell Aerospace Co.	416 U.S. 267	1974
Kahn v. Shevin	416 U.S. 351	1974
Pernell v. Southall Realty	416 U.S. 363	1974
Lehman Bros. v. Schein	416 U.S. 386	1974
Procunier v. Martinez	416 U.S. 396	1974
Gooding v. United States	416 U.S. 430	1974
Kewanee Oil Co. v. Bicron Corp.	416 U.S. 470	1974
State trade-secret law is not preempted by patent law.
Snow v. Commissioner	416 U.S. 500	1974
United States v. Giordano	416 U.S. 505	1974
United States v. Chavez	416 U.S. 562	1974
Mitchell v. W.T. Grant Co.	416 U.S. 600	1974
Donnelly v. DeChristoforo	416 U.S. 637	1974
Beasley v. Food Fair of N.C., Inc.	416 U.S. 653	1974
Calero-Toledo v. Pearson Yacht Leasing Co.	416 U.S. 663	1974
Bradley v. School Bd.	416 U.S. 696	1974
Alexander v. "Americans United" Inc.	416 U.S. 752	1974
Dillard v. Industrial Comm'n	416 U.S. 783	1974
Allee v. Medrano	416 U.S. 802	1974
Air Pollution Variance Bd. v. Western Alfalfa Corp.	416 U.S. 861	1974
