= Allee v. Medrano =

- Supreme Court of the United States

Decided May 20, 1974
- Full case name: Allee v. Medrano
- Citations: 416 U.S. 802 (more)

Holding
- Police officers' interference with a strike was a violation of the First and Fourteenth Amendments.

Court membership
- Chief Justice Warren E. Burger Associate Justices William O. Douglas · William J. Brennan Jr. Potter Stewart · Byron White; Thurgood Marshall · Harry Blackmun; Lewis F. Powell Jr. · William Rehnquist

Case opinions
- Majority: Douglas
- Concur/dissent: Burger, joined by White, Rehnquist
- Powell took no part in the consideration or decision of the case.

Allee v. Medrano, 416 U.S. 802 (1974), was a United States Supreme Court case in which the court held that police officers' interference with a strike was a violation of the First and Fourteenth Amendments.

== Background ==
From June 1966 to June 1967, unionists attempted to unionize farmworkers and persuade them to support or join a labor strike. They were subjected to persistent harassment and violence by Texas Rangers. In July 1967, a state court issued a temporary injunction against the unionists, proscribing picketing on or near property of one of the major employers in the area. The unionists filed a federal civil rights action under Section 1983, attacking the constitutionality of certain Texas statutes and alleging that the law-enforcement officers conspired to deprive the unionists of their First and Fourteenth Amendment rights. A three-judge federal district court declared five of the statutes unconstitutional and enjoined their enforcement, and in addition permanently enjoined the officers from intimidating the unionists in their organizational efforts.
