= Turner v. Safley =

- Supreme Court of the United States

Argued January 13, 1987 Decided June 1, 1987
- Full case name: William R. Turner, Superintendent, Missouri Department of Corrections, et al. v. Leonard Safley, et al.
- Docket no.: 85-1384
- Citations: 482 U.S. 78 (more) 107 S. Ct. 2254; 96 L. Ed. 2d 64; 1987 U.S. LEXIS 2362; 55 U.S.L.W. 4719
- Argument: Oral argument

Case history
- Prior: Judgment in part for plaintiffs, 586 F. Supp. 589 (W.D. Mo. 1984); affirmed, 777 F.2d 1307 (8th Cir. 1985); cert. granted, 476 U.S. 1139 (1986).

Holding
- A prison regulation preventing inmates from marrying without permission violated their constitutional right to marry because it was not logically related to a legitimate penological concern; but a prohibition on inmate-to-inmate correspondence was justified by prison security needs and so was permissible under the First Amendment, as applied through the Fourteenth.

Court membership
- Chief Justice William Rehnquist Associate Justices William J. Brennan Jr. · Byron White; Thurgood Marshall · Harry Blackmun; Lewis F. Powell Jr. · John P. Stevens; Sandra Day O'Connor · Antonin Scalia

Case opinions
- Majority: O'Connor, joined by Rehnquist, White, Powell, Scalia; Brennan, Marshall, Blackmun, Stevens (in part III-B only)
- Concur/dissent: Stevens, joined by Brennan, Marshall, Blackmun

Laws applied
- U.S. Const. amends. I, XIV

Turner v. Safley, 482 U.S. 78 (1987), was a U.S. Supreme Court decision involving the constitutionality of two Missouri prison regulations. One of the prisoners' claims related to the fundamental right to marry, and the other related to freedom of speech (in sending/receiving letters). The court held that a regulation preventing inmates from marrying without permission violated their constitutional right to marry because it was not logically related to a legitimate penological concern, but a prohibition on inmate-to-inmate correspondence was justified by prison security needs.

The case has been cited as precedent, establishing the "Turner Test" for constitutional challenges to prison regulations. According to the test, a prison regulation is constitutional if it satisfies four factors:

1. There is a rational connection to a legitimate government interest;
2. There are alternative means for prisoners to exercise their right(s);
3. Accommodation of the right(s) would have excessive "ripple effects"; and
4. There are no "ready alternatives."

This test has been used for decades by US courts, but it has also been criticized by legal scholars for being too deferential to prison administrators.

== Background ==
The Renz Correctional Institution, at the time a prison of the Missouri Department of Corrections (MODOC, then called the Missouri Division of Corrections) near Jefferson City, transitioned in 1975 from being a men's prison to housing both male and female inmates. It was there that two inmates, a man named Leonard Safley and a woman named Pearl Jane "P.J." Watson, met and began a relationship. There was an unwritten rule at the time that if two inmates developed a "close" or "physical" relationship, one would be transferred to another facility. After an incident that the trial court would describe as "a noisy lover's quarrel," Safley was transferred to the Ozark Correctional Center at Fordland, Missouri. Safley attempted to keep in touch with Watson by mail, but staff at Renz consistently prevented it from arriving. Safley tried using the pseudonym "Jack King," or having friends send letters on his behalf, but only a few of these made it to Watson.

Mail between inmates in different facilities was subject to divisional regulation 20–118.010(e), a rule that always allowed mail between family members or related to legal matters, but said other mail "may be allowed" if prison staff believed it was "in the best interest of the parties involved." Enforcement of this rule was inconsistent and varied by facility; in practice, Renz inmates were not allowed to send or receive mail from non-family inmates at other facilities without prior approval. Renz was the only facility in the state with an effective total ban.

Additionally, inmate marriages were restricted at Renz. At the time, regulation 20.117.050 did not authorize facility superintendents to prohibit inmate marriages, though they were not obligated to assist with them either. However, Renz's superintendent did regularly deny permission for inmates to marry, especially female inmates. After this litigation was filed, in December 1983, MODOC put out a new regulation which put a burden of proof on inmates to convince their superintendent that there was a "compelling reason" to allow them to marry. This did not make much difference at Renz, as the superintendent continued to deny permission to female inmates in most cases, stating that it was not in their "best interest."

As the end of Safley's sentence grew near, and he was transferred to a halfway house, he tried to visit Watson, but was denied permission when he arrived at Renz. MODOC rules prohibited former inmates from visiting prisons until six months after release. The two also wanted to get married, but were denied permission.

== Proceedings in lower courts ==
=== District Court ===
In 1981, they filed a lawsuit in the Western District of Missouri challenging the constitutionality of the restrictions on inmate mail, marriage, and visitation. In March 1982, during a preliminary injunction hearing, Safley's attorney Floyd Finch suggested to the Judge, Howard Sachs, that Safley and Watson could get married right then and there in court. Sachs allowed it over the objection of the state's attorney, seeing "no 'substantial state interest' in preventing it," and the newlyweds were allowed to sit together for 10 minutes.

This rendered their individual claim about the marriage restriction moot, but the case was certified as a class action and continued. A five-day trial was held in February 1984, and in May 1984 a ruling was issued that overturned the restrictions on mail and marriage, but left the visitation rule intact. As visitation was not nearly as important a right as the rights of marriage and free speech, the visitation rule was upheld "as a matter of legitimate discretion."

On the other hand, Judge Sachs' ruling applied strict scrutiny to the mail and marriage rules. The rationale offered by MODOC witnesses for the mail rule was discouraging the formation of inmate gangs, and preventing coordination of riots, escapes, etc. Sachs noted that in Procunier v. Martinez the Supreme Court had refrained from crafting a specific standard for mail between inmates, but after discussing various other opinions by appellate courts, he ruled that the mail regulations were "unnecessarily sweeping", and were therefore unconstitutional.

For the marriage rule, he relied on cases such as Zablocki v. Redhail and Loving v. Virginia that held marriage to be a fundamental human right. In his findings of fact, the judge found that the superintendent, out of an apparent "protective attitude", denied permission for female inmates to marry except where there was a birth or a pregnancy. Even though incarceration came with the loss of certain rights and freedoms, Sachs wrote,

. . . defendants have no right to have the last word on a personal decision of this import. Even inmates have the right to make their own mistakes.

— Safley v. Turner, 586 F. Supp. at 595 (W.D. Mo. 1984)

=== Court of Appeals ===
MODOC appealed the ruling to a three-judge panel of the 8th Circuit Court of Appeals, arguing that the trial court was wrong about the appropriate standard of review, and was clearly erroneous in its finding of fact. The Court disagreed, and affirmed the rulings of the trial court. It spent very little time discussing the "clearly erroneous" argument, simply noting that after reviewing the "entire record," they found "substantial evidence to support each finding of fact."

With respect to the mail rule, MODOC argued that that plaintiffs' status as inmates meant that the regulation should be review under a rational basis standard, rather than strict scrutiny. MODOC compared their rule to other prison rules which had been upheld, but the Court distinguished them as a "time, place, or manner" rules (as with Pell v. Procunier and Bell v. Wolfish, etc.), or as barely affecting freedom of speech (as with Jones v. North Carolina Prisoners' Labor Union). In contrast, an 8th Circuit case, Gregory v. Auger, had treated restriction on inmate mail as "a serious infringement of First Amendment liberties." As this case squarely dealt with speech, and finding no precedent in either Supreme Court or 8th Circuit caselaw to support a lower standard of review for prison rules on free speech, the Court upheld the application of strict scrutiny and the trial court's finding that the rule was unconstitutional.

In considering the marriage rule, the Court noted testimony from Superintendent Turner that, even before the new rule in 1983, "he believed he had the inherent power to deny permission [to marry] by virtue of Missouri statutes 'which allow me to control my institution.'" MODOC also argued that they had an interest in preventing "love triangles", which could lead to fights. The substance of MODOC's legal argument was again comparison to restrictions that had been upheld, and an argument that a lower level of scrutiny was appropriate. The Court found, however, that the other examples still left alternative ways for prisoners to exercise their rights, but "[h]ere, in contrast, both the old marriage rule as it was applied by Superintendent Turner and the 1983 rule on its face absolutely prevent those inmates denied permission from getting married." As the right to marriage was a "well settled" fundamental right, the Court again affirmed the lower court's reasoning and ultimate verdict.

== Decision of the Supreme Court ==
=== The Turner test ===
Writing for a five-justice majority, Justice Sandra Day O'Connor began by examining the precedent set by Procunier v. Martinez, and determining the appropriate level of scrutiny for judicial review of prison regulations. The Court in Martinez had stated, ". . .federal courts must take cognizance of the valid constitutional claims of prison inmates," but also said that "courts are ill equipped to deal with the increasingly urgent problems of prison administration and reform." Thus, there were competing interests of justice, and O'Connor argued that courts should tread carefully:

Running a prison is an inordinately difficult undertaking that requires expertise, planning, and the commitment of resources, all of which are peculiarly within the province of the legislative and executive branches of government. Prison administration is, moreover, a task that has been committed to the responsibility of those branches, and separation of powers concerns counsel a policy of judicial restraint.

— Turner v. Safley, 482 US at 85 (1987) (Justice O'Connor, writing for the majority)

O'Connor wrote that Martinez had not actually formulated a standard of review, and the lower courts had been incorrect to interpret it as imposing strict scrutiny in this case. Rather, Martinez had imposed strict scrutiny in a situation where inmate mail had been censored based on its content (mail was censored for statements that "unduly complain," "magnify grievances," or express "inflammatory political, racial, religious or other views"), and where the rights of non-inmates were also implicated. Whereas content-based regulation of speech by the general public was an easy case where strict scrutiny should be applied, the present case called for a new standard to be formulated.

Thus the Court formulated such a standard, which would come to be known as the Turner test. A prison regulation that affected inmates' constitutional rights "is valid if it is reasonably related to legitimate penological interests," and reasonableness would be judged by four factors:

1. Whether there is a “valid, rational connection” between the regulation and the legitimate governmental interest used to justify it;
2. Whether there are alternative means for the prisoner to exercise the right at issue;
3. The impact that the desired accommodation will have on guards, other inmates, and prison resources (so-called "ripple effects"); and
4. The presence or absence of “ready alternatives," where the presence of ready alternatives make it more likely that a regulation is unreasonable, while the absence make it less likely that the regulation is unreasonable.

=== The test applied to the mail rule ===
Applying this test, the Court found MODOC's mail rule to be reasonable. It noted testimony by prison officials that gang activity was a growing problem in Missouri prisons, and that separating and isolating gang members was a well-known strategy. Renz was also sometimes used to put inmates in protective custody, which might be undermined by inmates communicating with other facilities. The first factor was thus satisfied. For the second factor, the Court said that inmates still had other forms of expression available, implicitly stating the ability to send and receive mail should not be considered in isolation. For the third factor, the Court felt that lower courts had underestimated the cost of allowing mail between inmates, especially because "exercise of the right affects the inmates and staff of more than one institution." The administrative cost of monitoring inmate communications, thwarting gangs, etc., would thus be increased across the state, not just at Renz. Finally, the Court stated that MODOC had "no obvious, easy alternatives to the policy [it] adopted. Other well-run prison systems, including the Federal Bureau of Prisons, have concluded that substantially similar restrictions on inmate correspondence were necessary to protect institutional order and security."

=== The test applied to the marriage rule ===
The Court began by affirming that inmates did indeed have a right to marry, a right previously recognized by cases such as Zablocki v. Redhail and Loving v. Virginia:

The right to marry, like many other rights, is subject to substantial restrictions as a result of incarceration. Many important attributes of marriage remain, however, after taking into account the limitations imposed by prison life. First, inmate marriages, like others, are expressions of emotional support and public commitment. These elements are an important and significant aspect of the marital relationship. In addition, many religions recognize marriage as having spiritual significance; for some inmates and their spouses, therefore, the commitment of marriage may be an exercise of religious faith as well as an expression of personal dedication. Third, most inmates eventually will be released by parole or commutation, and therefore most inmate marriages are formed in the expectation that they ultimately will be fully consummated. Finally, marital status often is a precondition to the receipt of government benefits (e. g., Social Security benefits), property rights (e. g., tenancy by the entirety, inheritance rights), and other, less tangible benefits (e. g., legitimation of children born out of wedlock). These incidents of marriage, like the religious and personal aspects of the marriage commitment, are unaffected by the fact of confinement or the pursuit of legitimate corrections goals.

— Turner v. Safley, 482 U.S. at 96 (1987) (Justice O'Connor, writing for the majority)

The Court then reviewed the reasons MODOC had given for its marriage rule (that love triangles could lead to fights, or that many female inmates needed to "develop[e] skills of self-reliance" because they had a history of abuse or were too reliant on men), and found them to have no reasonable relationship to the actual rule. As for the love triangles, "surely . . . inmate rivalries are as likely to develop without a formal marriage ceremony as with one." The proposition that female inmates needed to be more self-reliant in no way explaining why women's requests were routinely denied and men's were routinely granted, and was inconsistent with testimony that there were no recorded problems with such marriages before the 1983 rule was adopted. Moreover, while the Court did not deem this fact to be necessary for its holding, it did observe that this "rehabilitation" rationale was based on a suspect classification, as it only applied only to women, in a system of "excessive paternalism."

The Court thus overturned the marriage rule, but upheld the mail rule on its face, and remanded the case back to the court of appeals for a determination of whether the mail rule was "arbitrary and capricious" as applied.

== Concurrence in part and dissent in part ==
Justice Stevens, joined by Justices Brennan, Marshall, and Blackmun, agreed with the majority's approach to the marriage rule, but disagreed with its analysis of the mail rule. He wrote,

How a court describes its standard of review when a prison regulation infringes fundamental constitutional rights often has far less consequence for the inmates than the actual showing that the court demands of the State in order to uphold the regulation. This case provides a prime example . . . if the standard can be satisfied by nothing more than a "logical connection" between the regulation and any legitimate penological concern perceived by a cautious warden, . . . it is virtually meaningless. Application of the standard would seem to permit disregard for inmates' constitutional rights whenever the imagination of the warden produces a plausible security concern and a deferential trial court is able to discern a logical connection between that concern and the challenged regulation. Indeed, there is a logical connection between prison discipline and the use of bullwhips on prisoners . . .

— Turner v. Safley, 482 US at 100 (1978) (Justice Stevens, concurring in part and dissenting in part)

One problem that Stevens had with the majority opinion is that it treated the plaintiff's case as only a facial challenge. He cited the original complaint and evidence from trial that discussed the ways that Renz's rules were different from every other facility in Missouri, and only paid lip service to some aspects of MODOC's state-wide standards. Both the trial court and the court of appeals, he argued, had properly grappled with the problems with Renz's rules as they were applied, and this was reflected in the injunctions and rulings they had issued. The majority, however, dealt only with MODOC's rules on their face, which clearly did not reflect the situation that had caused the plaintiffs to file their complaint.

Stevens also took issue with the way the majority handled the factual record of the case, with several assertions of fact (such as the gang problems, the availability of other means of expression, and the cost of reading all inmate mail) lacking "a sufficient basis in the record to support the Court's holding on the mail regulation."

For these reasons, although in theory the majority had developed a test and applied it to both the marriage rule and the mail rule, Stevens though their analysis of two rules was simply inconsistent:

In pointing out these inconsistencies, I do not suggest that the Court's treatment of the marriage regulation is flawed; as I stated, I concur fully in that part of its opinion. I do suggest that consistent application of the Court's reasoning necessarily leads to a finding that the mail regulation applied at Renz is unconstitutional.

— Turner v. Safley, 482 US at 115 (1978) (Justice Stevens, concurring in part and dissenting in part)

== Subsequent developments ==
Turner has been cited as precedent and is now considered to be part of a line of cases like Loving v. Virginia, Zablocki v. Redhail, and Obergefell v. Hodges, in which the Court has declared a fundamental right to marriage under the Fourteenth Amendment.
