= Guard labor =

Guard labor is wage labor and other activities that are said to maintain (hence "guard") a capitalist system. Things that are generally characterized as guard labor include: management, guards, military personnel, and prison officers. Samuel Bowles has expanded the notion of guard labor to include IT professionals whose duties include protecting corporate networks from costly misuse. Guard labor is noteworthy in economics because it captures expenditures based on mistrust and does not produce future capital.

The term was originally coined by Arjun Jayadev and Samuel Bowles and has since been used by economists such as Michael Perelman and Mark Thoma.

== See also ==
- Capitalist mode of production
- Management
- Wage slavery
