= Foreign languages in prisons =

Some prisons have sought to limit inmates' abilities to communicate in foreign languages, such as send or receive correspondence in these languages, or receive printed publications in these languages. This is often justified on the grounds that it might enable inmates to plan escapes or other crimes, or may contain material encouraging disorder in the prison, but that prison officials would not recognise them due to their inability to understand what was written or said.

Inmates and human rights activists have argued that this policy is discriminatory against minority groups who speak a different language, especially when they do not have good command of the mainstream language, and hence have difficulty communicating in it, when they wish to correspond with family members who do not speak the mainstream or national language (especially with foreign national prisoners), and where their language is an important part of their cultural or religious identity. (For example, Arabic is an important part of the religious identity of many Muslims, and Hebrew is an important part of the religious identity of Jews.)

== United States ==
The US Court of Appeals, Seventh Circuit, ruled in Kikumura v. Turner 28 F.3d 592 C.A.7(Ill).1994. (see ), that a blanket refusal to permit inmates to communicate or receive publications in a language other than English is unconstitutional. However, their ruling implies that the prison may still refuse to do so, if they have made a good faith effort to translate the materials or have they reviewed by a prison official who speaks the language, and found that such translation or review is not possible or too costly. But such an investigation of possibilities of review or translation must be made on a case-by-case basis, rather than a blanket prohibition without conducting such an analysis.

In 2005, the Wisconsin Department of Corrections banned "foreign language activities" at its prisons for security reasons. However, the department reversed its decision later in the year when it realized that worship services conducted by volunteers, including a Spanish-language Bible study group, were being canceled.

== See also ==
- Language policy
