= Wolff v. McDonnell =

- Supreme Court of the United States

Argued April 22, 1974 Decided June 26, 1974
- Full case name: Wolff, Warden, et al. v. McDonnell
- Docket no.: 73-679
- Citations: 418 U.S. 539 (more) 94 S. Ct. 2963; 41 L. Ed. 2d 935; 1974 U.S. LEXIS 91

Case history
- Prior: Judgment for plaintiffs in part, 342 F. Supp. 616 (D. Neb. 1972); aff'd in part, 483 F. 2d 1059 (8th Cir. 1973); cert. granted, 414 U.S. 1156 (1974).

Holding
- In administrative proceedings regarding discipline, prisoners retain some of their due process rights.

Court membership
- Chief Justice Warren E. Burger Associate Justices William O. Douglas · William J. Brennan Jr. Potter Stewart · Byron White; Thurgood Marshall · Harry Blackmun; Lewis F. Powell Jr. · William Rehnquist

Case opinions
- Majority: White, joined by Burger, Stewart, Blackmun, Powell, Rehnquist
- Concur/dissent: Marshall, joined by Brennan
- Concur/dissent: Douglas

Laws applied
- U.S. Const. amend. XIV

Wolff v. McDonnell, 418 U.S. 539 (1974), was a United States Supreme Court case in which the Court held that prisoners retained some due process rights when incarcerated. In particular, the Court ruled that due process required that prison disciplinary decisions to revoke good-time credits must be accompanied by notification of the inmate, administrative hearings, the chance to call witnesses and present evidence, and a written statement detailing the nature of the offense committed and the evidence for said offense.

== Background ==
In 1974, Robert O. McDonnell, an inmate at the Nebraska Penal and Correctional Complex, filed a class action lawsuit against Warden Charles Wolff Jr., charging, among other complaints, that the disciplinary proceedings hearings at the prison were biased and violated due process, that the inspection of all incoming and outbound mail (including mail to and from attorneys) was unreasonable, and that the legal assistance available to inmates was lacking. At the time, the process for disciplinary proceedings involved the prisoner being orally informed of the nature of the charges against them, a report being written by a committee, and the report being read to the inmate. If the inmate denied the charge, they could inquire as to the charging party, but could not cross-examine or present any witnesses. Penalties imposed by the hearings could include loss of good-time credits.

The district court granted only partial relief: it rejected the due process claim, and stated that the legal assistance was not unconstitutionally defective, but found the inspection of mail to violate the right of access to the courts.

The Eighth Circuit reversed the district court on the due process claim, affirmed the judgment regarding mail, and ordered hearings into the quality of legal assistance.

Robert Bork, in his capacity as Solicitor General of the United States, argued as amicus curiae, urging reversal of the judgment of the circuit court.

== Opinion of the Court ==
In the majority opinion authored by Justice White, the Court rejected the idea that prisoners were wholly deprived of their rights under the Constitution. Nevertheless, the majority opinion also recognized that reasonable constraints were, given the nature of imprisonment, not restrictive, especially when pertaining to issues of due process:

Prison disciplinary proceedings are not part of a criminal prosecution, and the full panoply of rights due a defendant in such proceedings does not apply.

The Court went on to note that prisoners were entitled to written notice of violations, at least a day in advance of any hearing, and a written statement from the committee regarding the evidence used and the reasons for a disciplinary hearing. So long as the acts were not "unduly hazardous to institutional safety or correctional goals", the prisoner could also call witnesses and present evidence in their defense, the Court ruled; the unrestricted right to do so would disrupt the authority of prison officials to provide for the safety of others. Likewise, allowing cross-examination would heighten the potential for disruption and danger; and allowing counsel would cause delay and reduce the utility of the proceedings.

The Court declined to rule on the impartiality of the committee, noting its mandate and the regulations that controlled it.

As for the question of searching the mail, the Court ruled that it had no issue with states requiring attorneys to specially mark their mail, with name and address; and said that opening mail in the presence of inmates did not constitute censorship.

The Court affirmed the Eighth Circuit on the issue of insufficient inmate legal assistance, and remanded the case for further judgment.

== Marshall's opinion ==
Justice Marshall, joined by Brennan, agreed on the issues of mail inspection and legal assistance, but disagreed with the majority on the matter of due process. In Marshall's view, inmates did not lose their rights by entering prison, and, in accordance with that, believed that the lack of confrontation and cross-examination in the majority opinion was the Court denying basic constitutional rights to inmates.

== Douglas's opinion ==
Justice Douglas believed the entirety of a "full hearing with all due process safeguards" was needed before punishments such as solitary confinement could be imposed.

== See also ==
- Superintendent v. Hill
- Morrissey v. Brewer
