= Procunier v. Martinez =

- Supreme Court of the United States

Decided April 29, 1974
- Full case name: Procunier v. Martinez
- Citations: 416 U.S. 396 (more)

Holding
- It is unconstitutional to prohibit incarcerated people from corresponding with law students and paralegals regarding prison conditions and potential attorney–client relationships.

Court membership
- Chief Justice Warren E. Burger Associate Justices William O. Douglas · William J. Brennan Jr. Potter Stewart · Byron White; Thurgood Marshall · Harry Blackmun; Lewis F. Powell Jr. · William Rehnquist

Case opinions
- Majority: Powell
- Concurrence: Marshall, joined by Brennan; Douglas (Part II)
- Concurrence: Douglas (in judgment)

Procunier v. Martinez, 416 U.S. 396 (1974), was a United States Supreme Court case in which the court held that it is unconstitutional to prohibit incarcerated people from corresponding with law students and paralegals regarding prison conditions and potential attorney–client relationships.

== Background ==
Incarcerated people, including Martinez, brought this class action challenging prison mail censorship regulations issued by the Director of the California Department of Corrections and the ban against the use of law students and legal paraprofessionals to conduct attorney–client interviews with incarcerated people. The mail censorship regulations, among other things, prohibited inmate correspondence that "unduly complain[ed]," "magnif[ied] grievances," "express[ed] inflammatory political, racial, religious or other views or beliefs," or contained matter deemed "defamatory" or "otherwise inappropriate."

The federal District Court held these regulations to be unconstitutional under the First Amendment, void for vagueness, and violations of the Fourteenth Amendment's guarantee of procedural due process. The court enjoined their continued enforcement. Further, the court required that an inmate be notified of the rejection of correspondence and that the author of the correspondence be allowed to protest the decision and secure review by a prison official other than the original censor. The District Court also held that the ban against the use of law students and legal paraprofessionals to conduct attorney–client interviews with incarcerated people abridged the right of access to the courts and enjoined its continued enforcement. The prison officials appealed, contending that the District Court should have abstained from deciding the constitutionality of the mail censorship regulations.

== Opinion of the court ==
The Supreme Court issued an opinion on April 29, 1974.
