= Debbie Cenziper =

American investigative journalist

- Education: University of Florida
- Occupations: Investigative journalist; nonfiction author
- Employers: The Washington Post; Medill School of Journalism

Debbie Cenziper is a Pulitzer Prize-winning American investigative journalist and nonfiction author. As of November 2022 she writes for ProPublica and is the director of the Medill Investigative Lab at Northwestern University. She spent more than a decade as an investigative reporter at The Washington Post, and has written two nonfiction books.

== Early life and education ==
Cenziper grew up in Philadelphia and graduated from the University of Florida, in 1992.

== Career ==
She worked as a reporter for the Miami Herald, The Charlotte Observer, and the South Florida Sun-Sentinel.

She won a 2007 Pulitzer Prize for a series of articles exposing corruption and waste in the Miami-Dade Housing Agency, which the Miami Herald published in 2006. She was a Pulitzer Prize finalist in 2006 for a series of stories on breakdowns in the nation's hurricane-forecasting system.

She spent more than a decade as an investigative reporter at The Washington Post. During her time there, she was one of the lead authors of "The Pandora Papers", an award-winning 2021 international investigation about the covert movement of money around the world, co-published with the International Consortium of Investigative Journalists.

In April 2019 she was named the director of The Medill Investigative Lab Northwestern University's Medill School of Journalism.

As of November 2022 Cenziper writes for ProPublica.

== Books ==
She is the co-author of the nonfiction book Love Wins: The Lovers and Lawyers Who Fought the Landmark Case for Marriage Equality. The book, published in 2016 by William Morrow, tells the story behind the landmark Obergefell v. Hodges Supreme Court case which ruled that the fundamental right to marry is guaranteed to same-sex couples. The book received a starred review by Booklist and was named a notable book of 2016 by The Washington Post.

Her second nonfiction book, Citizen 865: The Hunt for Hitler's Hidden Soldiers in America, was published on November 12, 2019, by Hachette Books. In a review in The Washington Post, Jonathan Kirsch wrote, "Cenziper brought her investigative skills to bear on the challenge of retrieving the hard facts, but she also possesses the gift of a storyteller....[Citizen 865 is] a highly significant work of investigation that is eye-opening and heartbreaking. She compels us to confront the crimes of the Trawniki men in a way that burns itself into both memory and history."

== Recognition ==
She is a frequent speaker at universities, national writing conferences, book clubs and festivals. She has been a guest on dozens of television and radio shows, including CNN, MSNBC and NPR's Talk of the Nation.

== Awards ==
- Society of Professional Journalists, Gene Miller Award for Investigative Reporting, 2004, 2005, 2006, 2007
- Investigative Reporters and Editors Award, winner, 2004, finalist, 2005, 2006, 2012, 2013
- Florida Society of Newspaper Editors, gold medal for public service, 2005, 2006, 2007
- Pulitzer Prize finalist, explanatory reporting, 2006
- Pulitzer Prize, local reporting, 2007
- Sigma Delta Chi Award for investigative reporting, 2007
- Harry Chapin award for reporting on hunger and poverty, 2007
- Harvard University's Goldsmith Prize for Investigative Reporting, grand prize, 2009, finalist, 2007
- University of Florida, Outstanding Young Alumni Award, 2008
- George Polk Award for Metropolitan Reporting, 2008
- Maryland Press and Virginia Press awards, 2008, 2009, 2011
- Heywood Broun award for substantial distinction, 2009, finalist 2014
- American Society of Newspaper Editors, local accountability award, 2014
- Robert F. Kennedy Human Rights Award, 2014
- Book award finalist, Investigative Reporters and Editors (IRE), 2019
- 2021 (for Pandora Papers): Scripps Howard Award, national/international investigative reporting; Scripps Howard Award, impact award; Overseas Press Club, Malcolm Forbes Award; White House Correspondents Association, Katharine Graham Award for Courage and Accountability

== Works ==
- Cenziper, Debbie; Obergefell, Jim (2016). Love Wins:The Lovers and Lawyers Who Fought the Landmark Case for Marriage Equality. New York: William Morrow. ISBN 978-0062456083.
- Cenziper, Debbie (2019). Citizen 865: The Hunt for Hitler's Hidden Soldiers in America. Hachette Books. ISBN 9780316449656.
