= Richard Hodges (American politician) =

American politician (born 1963)

Richard A. Hodges

Director of the Ohio Department of Health
- In office August 11, 2014 – March 31, 2017
- Governor: John Kasich
- Preceded by: Ted Wymyslo
- Succeeded by: Lance Himes

Executive Director of the Ohio Turnpike Commission
- In office November 7, 2011 – August 10, 2014
- Governor: John Kasich
- Preceded by: George Distel
- Succeeded by: Randy Cole

Member of the Ohio House of Representatives from the 82nd district
- In office January 3, 1993 – January 3, 1999
- Preceded by: Larry Manahan
- Succeeded by: Steve Buehrer

Personal details
- Born: October 12, 1963 (age 62) Sidney, Ohio, U.S.
- Party: Republican

Richard A. Hodges (born October 12, 1963) is an American politician who served as Director of the Ohio Department of Health from August 2014 to 2017. He is a former member of the Ohio House of Representatives, serving from 1993 to 1999.

Hodges was legally required to serve as defendant in the landmark civil rights case Obergefell v. Hodges, which he lost, resulting in the legalization of same-sex marriage everywhere in the United States. He personally supported same-sex marriage prior to the lawsuit. However, his oath of office legally obligated him to defend Ohio's existing statutes.

== Biography ==
=== Early life and education ===
Hodges graduated from Archbold High School in Archbold, Ohio and received his Bachelor of Arts with Honors in Government from Oberlin College, Oberlin, Ohio. He later earned his Masters in Public Administration from the University of Toledo.

=== Career ===
Hodges was appointed County Treasurer of Fulton County, Ohio in 1987 and was elected to a full term in 1988. In 1992 he successfully ran for the Ohio House of Representatives. While in the legislature Hodges chaired the House Commerce and Labor Committee responsible for Workers Compensation and employment law. He also served on the Health and Retirement Committee, Ohio Turnpike Commission and the Ohio Bureau of Workers' Compensation Oversight Committee. He received the Watchdog of the Treasury from the United Conservatives of Ohio 3 times and the Friend of Life Award from the same organization once.

Hodges chose not to run for reelection in 1998, instead choosing to work in the private sector for Community Hospitals of Williams County in Bryan, Ohio from 1993 to 1998 and later Fulton County Health Center in Wauseon, Ohio from 1998 to 2000. He became Executive Vice President of the Mechanical Contractors Association of Northwestern Ohio from 2000 to 2005 where he was responsible for collective bargaining, employee assistance plans and Taft-Hartley health and welfare plans. He also served on the Toledo Public Schools Oversight Commission for construction and renovation of over 60 public school buildings in Toledo, Ohio as well as the Board of Directors for the Regional Growth Partnership. From 2005 to 2009 he was CEO of the Tucson Association of REALTORS and Multiple Listing Service. While in Tucson he was active in leadership roles in various issue campaigns including the RTA Bond Issue initiative. He served a brief stint as Executive Director of the Metropolitan Builders Association of Greater Milwaukee before returning to Ohio.

Hodges was the Executive Director of the Ohio Turnpike Commission, from November 2011 to August 2014. While in that post he supported Governor John Kasich's plan to leverage $1 billion in bonds for investment in highway construction projects near the Ohio Turnpike.

==== Obergefell v. Hodges ====
Hodges took up his position as director of the Ohio Department of Health on August 11, 2014, under an appointment by Ohio governor John Kasich. In his capacity as the Director of the Ohio Department of Public Health, Hodges was the lead-named respondent in the 2015 United States Supreme Court case Obergefell v. Hodges. The Supreme Court ruled against him, resulting in same-sex marriage being legalized in all 50 states. In 2017, Hodges resigned. Subsequently, he has expressed support for marriage equality—he attended a same-sex wedding just a few days after the decision—and has maintained a friendship with Jim Obergefell, the lead plaintiff in the case. The two former opponents have made public appearances together. After leaving government, Hodges became Executive in Residence and Visiting Professor at Ohio University.

== Personal life ==
=== Marriage ===
Hodges is married to his wife, Susan Hodges, and they have two children.

=== Friendship with Obergefell ===
After resigning his post in 2017, he became an outspoken supporter of LGBT rights and has become friends with his legal opponent, Jim Obergefell.
