= Al Gerhardstein =

American lawyer

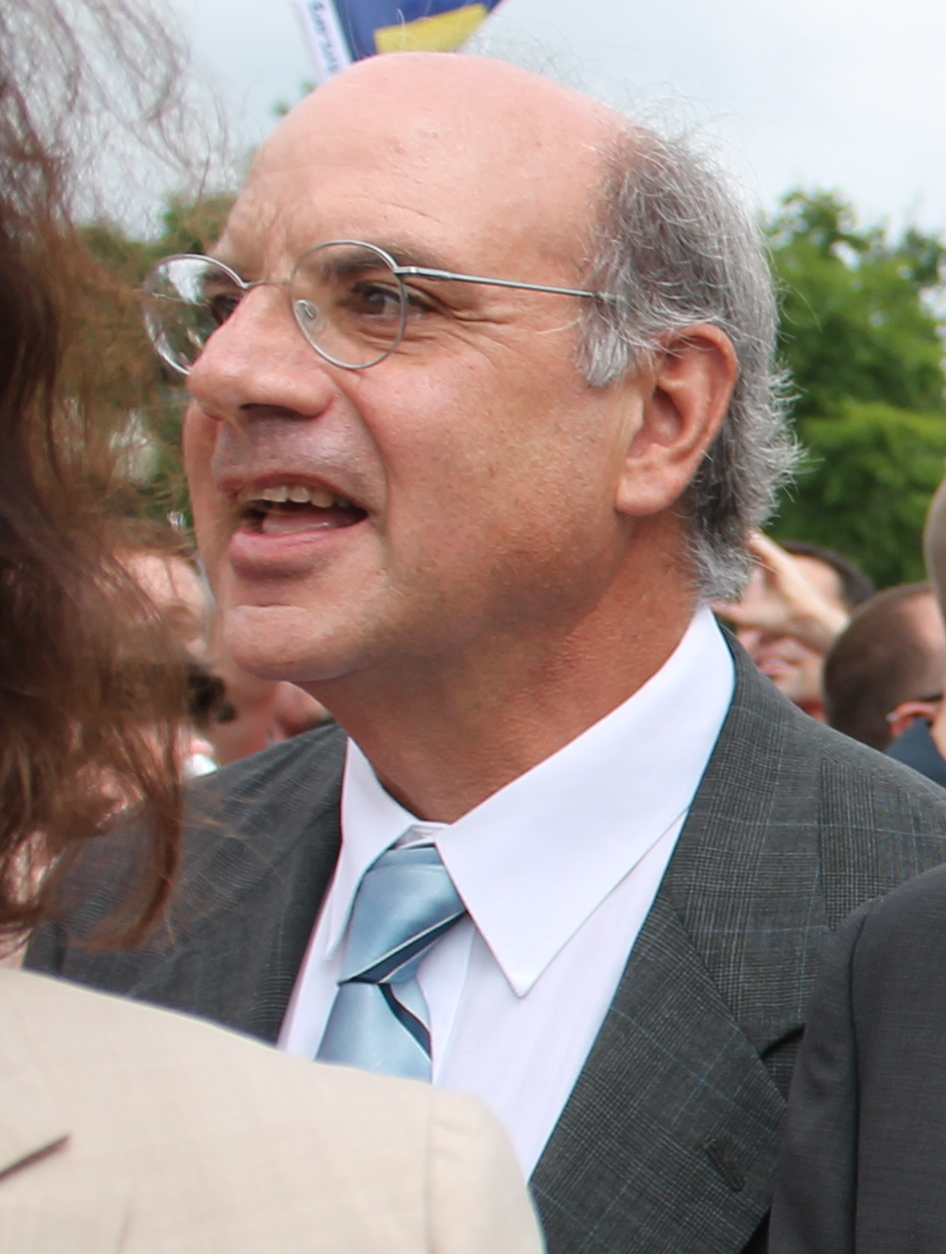
Al Gerhardstein

Alphonse A. "Al" Gerhardstein (born 1951) is a civil rights attorney in Ohio who has been litigating since 1976. He was lead counsel for James Obergefell in the Supreme Court's same-sex marriage decision Obergefell v. Hodges. He has also been an advocate on behalf of prisoners, alleged victims of police misconduct, and abortion and LGBTQ-related causes. He has recovered millions of dollars and secured substantial reforms for victims of official misconduct. He founded the Ohio Justice and Policy Center, a nonprofit agency that advocates and litigates for criminal justice reform.

== Early life ==
Gerhardstein was born in Cleveland, Ohio, to Carolyn and Richard Gerhardstein. His father was the manager of a commercial chicken farm for over ten years, then lost both his job and the pension he had been promised. Gerhardstein described how this experience and its effect on his family made a deep impression on him.

He attended Beloit College, graduating in 1973, where he met and later married Mimi Gingold, the daughter of juvenile court judge Archie Gingold of St. Paul, Minnesota. He attended New York University School of Law on a Root-Tilden public interest scholarship and earned his Juris Doctor in 1976.

== Legal career ==
Gerhardstein began his legal career as a Reginald Heber Smith Fellow at the Legal Aid Society of Cincinnati, Ohio. After two years, he joined Robert Laufman, a leading civil rights attorney, practicing primarily in the areas of employment discrimination, police misconduct and prisoner rights. After Laufman's retirement in 2004, Jennifer Branch joined him as a partner and the firm became Gerhardstein and Branch, LPA. The firm described its mission as litigating "causes, not cases." Jennifer Branch was elected as a common pleas judge in Hamilton County, Ohio, in 2020 and Gerhardstein then merged his firm with another to create Friedman, Gilbert and Gerhardstein.

== Civil rights practice ==
=== Prisoner rights ===
Gerhardstein commented in a Frontline interview that prisoners have no political base, only the power of the courts to redress grievances. In 1994, Gerhardstein was named lead counsel in a class action against the state officers, administrators and staff of the Southern Ohio Correctional Facility in Lucasville, Ohio, on behalf of inmate victims of the riot that occurred there in 1993. The plaintiffs were awarded a record $4.1 million as part of a class action settlement that included sweeping reforms of the practices and procedures at that maximum security prison.

Gerhardstein and fellow attorney Robert Newman had previously sued the state of Ohio for cruel and unusual punishment on behalf of a class of mentally ill prisoners. After filing the legal action, they worked with the defendant Director of the Department of Rehabilitation and Corrections to address the underlying problems. That collaboration resulted in a court enforced consent decree providing for reforms based on a treatment-oriented approach to mentally ill inmates in all Ohio state prisons. He filed a class action challenging the level of medical and dental services provided for inmates by the Ohio Department of Rehabilitation and Correction in 2003. That challenge resulted in a settlement agreement including a five-year supervised plan to substantially improve those services.

From 2008 to 2015, Gerhardstein worked with the Children's Law Center of Covington, Kentucky, and achieved significant reforms in the Ohio juvenile justice system by entering into an agreed order in cooperation with the defendant administrators of the Ohio Department of Youth Services on behalf of incarcerated juveniles. That agreement eventually resulted in a dramatic reduction of the inmate population, closure of several juvenile prisons, elimination of solitary confinement and improved mental health, educational and recreational services for the children in the juvenile detention facilities throughout the state. In 1997, he founded the Ohio Justice and Policy Center which continues to pursue reforms for incarcerated people in Ohio.

=== Police misconduct ===
"There are lots of different strategies that don't rely on arresting black people and feeding more mass incarceration, and that's what we've worked so hard on." Gerhardstein was quoted as saying in an article published in The Atlantic.

In 2001, Gerhardstein and co-counsel filed a class action on behalf of the Cincinnati Black United Front and Ohio ACLU challenging the use of excessive force and racial profiling by the Cincinnati Police Department. The case was resolved through a collaborative plan, a mediation process that was markedly different from the approach taken in similar actions filed in other jurisdictions. Gerhardstein explained, "[w]e went to court because we've tracked 30 years of promises by the city. We need to have a set of promises that are enforceable." One month after that action was filed, an unarmed black teenager was shot and killed by a Cincinnati police officer, sparking riots throughout the city. Continuing his approach to resolve serious underlying systemic problems, Gerhardstein participated along with city officials, the police union, and citizens in the creation of a collaborative agreement that established wide reaching reforms in the department that has become a model for other jurisdictions. In 2022, the City of Cincinnati celebrated the 20th anniversary of the Collaborative Agreement.

One of Gerhardstein's areas of focus has been taser reform. He has litigated cases and published a white paper seeking policies and training that require officers to avoid chest shots and other tactics that increase the risk of injury. The local county sheriff's association in Hamilton County, Ohio, responded to the white paper, opening a valuable local dialogue.

In 2021, he secured significant court enforceable reforms at the Cincinnati Emergency Communications Center and a $6,000,000 settlement for the family of Kyle Plush, a teenager who had been trapped in his family van, called 911 twice and was not located or rescued before his death. Under the five year agreement an expert team will work with the City of Cincinnati to upgrade their 911 services and police response.

=== Reproductive freedom ===
Gerhardstein represented the Planned Parenthood affiliate in Cincinnati and other Ohio abortion providers between 1985 and 2020. After the Planned Parenthood clinic was firebombed in December 1985, he secured an order requiring protesters to respect the women arriving as patients at the temporary clinic and to respect their right of access. His lawsuits challenged numerous Ohio laws restricting abortion and many were held to be unconstitutional.

=== LGBTQ rights ===
Gerhardstein has been an active advocate for the rights of the LGBTQ community. His work is chronicled in Episode 5 of Amend: The Fight for America and in the book Love Wins, authored by James Obergefell and Debbie Cenziper. Starting in 1994, Gerhardstein sued the City of Cincinnati unsuccessfully for five years in an effort to strike down an infamous Cincinnati Charter provision that prohibited the enactment of any law that protected the gay community.

After the Supreme Court's decision in Romer v. Evans, striking down a Colorado law with almost identical language to that in the Cincinnati Charter, the case was remanded to the Sixth Circuit to be considered in light of the new precedent. However, the Sixth Circuit upheld the charter amendment for the second time, and it stood until overturned by Cincinnati voters in 2004. He and his law partner, Jennifer Branch, have also represented individual gay and transgender persons in employment discrimination actions.

An opportunity to further the cause of gay rights arrived when Gerhardstein was first introduced to James Obergefell and his dying husband, John Arthur, in 2013. He met with them and explained that Ohio would not recognize their Maryland same-sex marriage. As a result, when he died, the death certificate for John would state that he was a single person with no surviving spouse. Changing that would require immediate legal action against the state. Obergefell said Gerhardstein was the perfect attorney for them and was unsure they would have gone forward with anyone else. Gerhardstein filed suit in federal court seeking an emergency injunction prohibiting the state of Ohio from issuing a death certificate for John that listed the deceased as single and without a surviving spouse.

U.S. District Judge Timothy Black decided in their favor, holding that "[u]nder the Constitution of the United States, Ohio must recognize on Ohio death certificates valid same-sex marriages from other states." A similar case was decided in favor of married same-sex parents who had given birth following in-vitro conception and who adopted children and wanted both parents listed on their children's birth certificates. The state of Ohio appealed to the Sixth Circuit Court of Appeals. Those cases were consolidated with others from district courts within the Sixth Circuit that were more broadly and directly challenging gay marriage bans. The appellate court reversed the trial courts' decisions and held that states could indeed ban same-sex marriage.

Ultimately, Gerhardstein and other lawyers whose cases had been consolidated petitioned the United States Supreme Court for a hearing, which was granted. On June 26, 2015, the Court announced its historic decision in Obergefell v. Hodges that established same-sex marriage, finding that same-sex couples had a constitutional right to marry in all fifty states.

== Teaching and speaking ==
Gerhardstein has served as an adjunct professor of law at the University of Cincinnati College of Law and Salmon P. Chase College of Law teaching civil rights litigation and prisoner rights. In 2022, Gerhardstein donated his papers to the University of Cincinnati Libraries' Archives and Rare Books.

Considering himself "semi-retired", Gerhardstein speaks extensively on civil rights litigation including at law schools and for the Federal Bar Association.

== Referenced cases ==
- In re Southern Ohio Correctional Facility, 173 F.R.D. 205 (S.D. Ohio 1997).
- Fussel et al. v. Wilkinson, Case No. 1-03-CV-704, 2005 WL 3132321, (S.D. Ohio Nov. 22, 2005).
- Dunn v. Voinovich, Case No. C1-93-0166 (S.D. Ohio 2000).
- S.H. v. Taft, No. 2:04-cv-1206, 2007 WL 1989753 (S.D. Ohio July 9, 2007).
- In re Cincinnati Policing, 209 F.R.D. 395 (S.D. Ohio 2002).
- Goodwin v. City of Painesville, 781 F.3d 314 (6th Cir. 2015).
- Brown v. Chapman, 814 F.3d 447 (6th Cir. 2016).
- Peabody v. Perry Twp., Ohio, No. 2:10-cv-1078, 2013 WL 1327026 (S.D. Ohio 2013).
- Planned Parenthood Ass'n. of Cinti., Inc. v. Project Jericho, 556 N.E.2d 157 (Ohio St. 1990).
- Women’s Medical Professional Corp v. Taft, 114 F. Supp. 2d 664 (S.D. Ohio 2000).
- Cincinnati Women’s Services v. Taft, 468 F.3d 361 (6th Cir. 2006).
- Planned Parenthood Southwest Ohio Region v. Hodges, USDC, SDOH, Case No. 2:15-cv-3079.
- Glover v. Williamsburg Local School Dist. Bd. of Educ., 20 F.Supp.2d 1160 (S.D. Ohio 1998).
- Barnes v. City of Cincinnati, 401 F.3d 729 (6th Cir. 2005).
- Obergefell v. Kasich, No. 13-cv-501, 2013 WL 3814262 (S.D. Ohio July 22, 2013).
- DeBoer v. Snyder, 772 F.3d 388 (6th Cir. 2014).
- Obergefell v. Hodges, 135 S.Ct. 2584, 192 L.Ed.2d 609 (2015).
- Plush v. City of Cincinnati et al, WL 7383257 (Ohio App 2020).
- Lawson v. Kennedy, 2:25-cv-607 (S.D. Ohio Mar 31, 2026)

== Publications ==
- Alphonse A. Gerhardstein, "Making a Buck While Making a Difference," 21 Michigan Journal of Race & Law 251 (2016). ISSN 1095-2721 <https://doi.org/10.36643/mjrl.21.2.making>
- Alphonse Gerhardstein & David Krings, "Uncomfortably True, Police Misconduct Cases, Keys to Appropriate Methods of Resolution," 10 Public Management (2012).
- Alphonse A. Gerhardstein, "Can Effective Apology Emerge Through Litigation?" 72 Law and Contemporary Problems No. 2 (Spring 2009). ISSN 0023-9186 <https://scholarship.law.duke.edu/cgi/viewcontent.cgi?article=1532&context=lcp>
- Alphonse Gerhardstein, "Leveraging Maximum Reform While Enforcing Minimum Standards," XXXVI Fordham Urban Law Journal No. 1 (January 2009). ISSN 0199-4646 <https://ir.lawnet.fordham.edu/cgi/viewcontent.cgi?article=2294&context=ulj>
- Alphonse Gerhardstein, "A Practitioner’s Guide to Successful Jury Trials on Behalf of Prisoner-Plaintiffs," 24 Pace Law Review No. 2 (Spring 2004). ISSN 2331-3528 <https://doi.org/10.58948/2331-3528.1210>
- Alphonse Gerhardstein, "PLRA Can Affect Private Practitioner’s Ability to Represent Inmates," XIII Correctional Law Reporter 66 (Feb/Mar 2002). ISSN 1043-6766

== Awards and recognitions ==
- 2016 – Holmes-Weatherly Award, Unitarian Universalist Association, Boston, Massachusetts
- 2016 – Honorary Degree, Doctor of Humane Letters, Meadville Lombard Theological School, Chicago, IL
- 2016 – Making Democracy Work Award (Joint with wife, Mimi Gingold), League of Women Voters of the Cincinnati Area
- 2015 – Courage Award, Ohio Association for Justice
- 2015 – Ally for Equality Award, for support to LGBT Community, Equality Ohio
- 2014 – Racial Justice Award, YWCA Greater Cincinnati
- 2014 – Theodor M. Berry Award, Cincinnati Chapter, NAACP
- 2010 – Courage Award, Ohio Association for Justice
- 2008 – The Diamond Award for Leadership, Service and Support, Planned Parenthood Southwest Ohio Region
- 2008 – Jewish National Fund/Judge Carl B. Rubin Legal Society Attorney of the Year
- 2007 – President's Award, for dedication to community service, civil rights, and to the Sentinels Police Association's Mission, Sentinel Police Association
- 2005 – Martin Luther King Spirit Award Baptist Minister's Conference, Health Alliance of Cincinnati, UC Medical Center
- 2003 – Charles P. Taft Civic Gumption Award, Charter Party of Cincinnati
- 2002 – Wright-Overstreet Award for Community Service, NAACP Cincinnati Chapter
- 2001 – Outstanding Achievement Award, Cincinnati Women's Political Caucus
- 1998 – Community Service Award, Stonewall Cincinnati
- 1995 – Andrew B. Dennison Courageous Advocate Award Potter Stewart Inn of Court
