= Jim Obergefell =

American civil rights activist (born 1966)

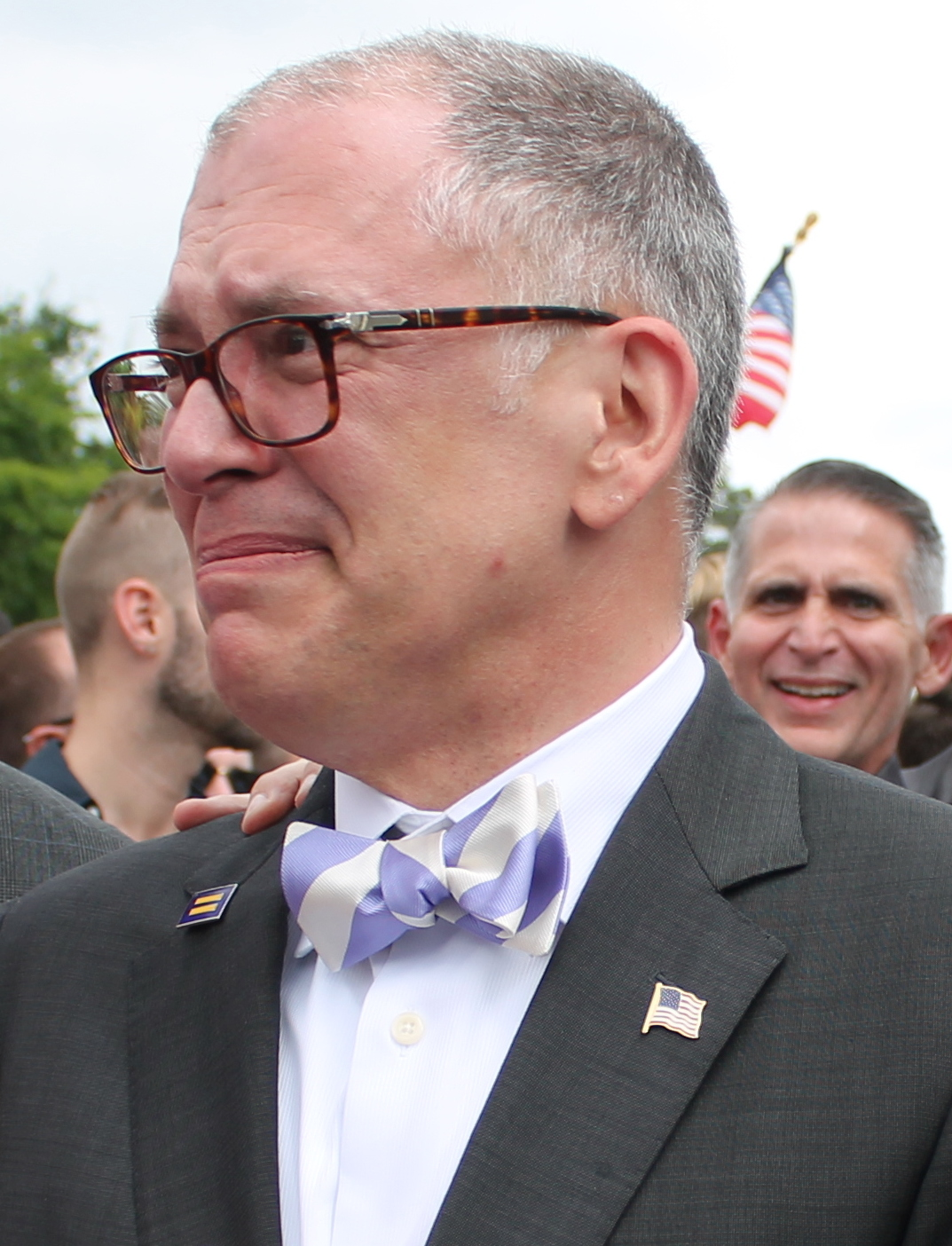
- Obergefell outside the U.S. Supreme Court in June 2015
- Born: July 7, 1966 (age 60); Sandusky, Ohio, U.S.
- Education: University of Cincinnati (BA); Bowling Green State University
- Known for: Plaintiff in Supreme Court case Obergefell v. Hodges
- Political party: Democratic
- Spouse: John Arthur (m. 2013; died 2013)

James Obergefell (/ˈoʊbərɡəfɛl/ OH-bər-gə-fel; born July 7, 1966) is an American civil rights activist who was the lead plaintiff in the 2015 United States Supreme Court case Obergefell v. Hodges, which legalized same-sex marriage throughout the United States. Obergefell had sued the state of Ohio in 2013 due to the state's lack of legal recognition of Obergefell's marriage to his husband, John Arthur (1967–2013). Obergefell was the Democratic nominee for the 89th legislative district of the Ohio House of Representatives in the 2022 elections.

== Biography ==
=== Early life and education ===
James Obergefell was born on July 7, 1966.

Obergefell graduated from Sandusky High School in 1984 and went on to attend the University of Cincinnati, where he earned a degree in secondary education and German. He attended graduate school at Bowling Green State University. Out of college, he was a high school German teacher. In his mid-twenties, Obergefell came out, first to his eldest sister. His mother's death preceded his coming out, but the rest of his family were largely "unsurprised and unperturbed". While his father was not always supportive, Obergefell found a strong relationship with his aunt Paulette.

Obergefell v. Hodges case

Obergefell began to attend an Episcopal Church but later declared himself an atheist.

=== Career ===
Prior to his experience in court, Obergefell was a consultant and realtor in Ohio. He consulted along with his partner Arthur. After the case won in the Supreme Court in 2015, Obergefell spent a year traveling around the globe to speak about the case and his own life.

Obergefell cofounded Equality Vines, the first cause-based wine label that supports organizations devoted to civil rights and equality. He works with Keppler Speakers as a speaker and an activist. He also co-authored the book Love Wins (2017) with Debbie Cenziper. The book explores the lives of the lovers and lawyers who were essential to the victory of Obergefell v. Hodges.

In February 2016, soon after the court ruling, Obergefell moved to Washington, D.C., to continue pursuing his political endeavors. After three years of activism in D.C., Obergefell decided to move back to Ohio to be closer to his family. When asked about his favorite memory from his time in D.C., Obergefell said, "To be in that courtroom and have it finally sink in as Justice Kennedy [read] the decision that we won, and that John could finally rest in peace. And that people like us around the country could get married, it's hard to top that." In a 2019 interview with Washington, D.C.–based station WUSA (TV), Obergefell said he was looking forward to working on advancing LGBTQ and minority rights on a state level, starting with his home state of Ohio, since additional federal progress seemed unattainable to him at the time.

In January 2022, Jim Obergefell ran for the Ohio House of Representatives for the state's 89th legislative district, covering Erie, Huron, and Ottawa counties. In the August 2022 Democratic primaries, Obergefell ran unopposed and won. He was defeated by Republican incumbent D. J. Swearingen.

Obergefell volunteers to officiate weddings, having officiated at eight same-sex weddings and one opposite-sex wedding after winning his case.

==== Court cases ====
In 2011, Obergefell's longtime partner John Arthur was diagnosed with ALS. In July 2013, Obergefell and a gravely ill Arthur were legally married in Maryland. However, after meeting with Al Gerhardstein, a civil rights attorney, they were told that due to Ohio's same-sex marriage ban, Obergefell could not be listed as Arthur's surviving spouse on his death certificate.

They filed a lawsuit, and the Ohio case became known as Obergefell v. Kasich. A federal judge agreed to hear the case the following court day due to Arthur's illness. The judge ruled in Obergefell's favor, but the state of Ohio appealed to a higher court and won, resulting in Obergefell's appeal to the U.S. Supreme Court. Arthur died in October 2013, and soon Obergefell devoted his time to the legalizing of same-sex marriage nationwide with the Supreme Court case Obergefell v. Hodges.

The two questions that would drive Obergefell's appeal to court would be: 1) whether it was constitutional for states to discriminate between gay and straight couples in granting marriage licenses, and 2) whether the Constitution required every state to recognize legal marriages of same sex couples who were married in another state. Obergefell v. Hodges was decided on Friday, June 26, 2015, with five of the nine Supreme Court justices ruling in Obergefell's favor. Justice Anthony Kennedy, who wrote the majority opinion for the case, stated in the court: “No union is more profound than marriage, for it embodies the highest ideals of love, fidelity, devotion, sacrifice, and family. In forming a marital union, two people become something greater than they once were.” After winning the case, Obergefell stated, "It affirms what millions across the country already know to be true in their hearts: our love is equal. The four words etched onto the front of the Supreme Court 'equal justice under law' apply to us, too." President Barack Obama reached out to congratulate Obergefell and thanked him for "his leadership that has changed our country."

Obergefell has stated that he did not take his case to court for financial reasons. According to Obergefell, federal recognition of his marriage would only grant him $255 in additional Social Security benefits and potentially a small disability benefit when he retires.

== Personal life ==
=== Marriage ===
In the early 1990s, at Uncle Woody's, a bar near the University of Cincinnati, Obergefell met John Arthur, the man he would eventually marry. They began dating, moved in together, and worked together in IT consulting and client relations management at several companies. Several years into their relationship, Arthur was diagnosed with ALS. Obergefell acted as Arthur's carer for the remainder of their relationship. By 2013, Arthur became bed-bound, and Obergefell and Arthur decided to get married. Same-sex marriage was illegal in their home state of Ohio, so close friends and family of the couple pooled together to rent a medically equipped plane for the couple to travel to a state where same-sex marriage was legal for their wedding. On July 11, 2013, the couple got an ambulance to escort Arthur to a private plane that flew Arthur, Obergefell, a nurse, and Arthur's aunt Paulette, who performed the ceremony, to Baltimore/Washington International Airport in Anne Arundel County, Maryland, where the marriage ceremony was performed while the plane sat on the tarmac. Arthur died on October 22, 2013.

== Legacy ==
=== Media appearances ===
In 2016, Obergefell was invited by Michelle Obama to attend Obama's final State of the Union address. When asked about the event, Obergefell said: "We the people. This core American belief is why the other marriage-equality plaintiffs and I, and so many others before us, stood up to fight for our rights."

When Justice Kennedy retired in 2018, Obergefell declared that he felt "despondent" believing the loss of Kennedy could have negative repercussions for the LGBTQ+ community, such as Obergefell v. Hodges being overturned. Obergefell stated that Justice Kennedy's legacy was undermined by his decision to retire during a Trump presidency because Obergefell "wouldn't trust any Justice nominated by this president to respect and protect LGBTQ+ rights."

=== Recognition ===
In 2016, the National Underground Railroad Freedom Center in Cincinnati honored Obergefell with the Everyday Freedom Hero award. The award is given to people whose actions are deemed to reflect the ideals of the underground railroad. The city council of Cincinnati declared April 28 (the day the oral arguments were made in Obergefell v. Hodges) John Arthur Day in honour of the couple. The mayor of the city, John Cranley, referred to Obergefell as a "historic figure" for the city and the United States as a whole. In 2015, Obergefell was featured on Foreign Policy's Global Thinkers and Out magazine's Out 100 lists. He was also appointed to the National Advisory Board for the GLBT Historical Society and the Board of Advisors for the Mattachine Society of Washington. Obergefell has also been honored by the ACLU of Southern California, the National Gay & Lesbian Chamber of Commerce, and the Santa Clara University School of Law.
