= Obergefell v. Hodges =

2015 U.S. Supreme Court case on same-sex marriage

- Supreme Court of the United States

Argued April 28, 2015 Decided June 26, 2015
- Full case name: James Obergefell, et al., Petitioners v. Richard Hodges, Director, Ohio Department of Health, et al.
- Docket no.: 14-556
- Citations: 576 U.S. 644 (more) 135 S. Ct. 2584; 192 L. Ed. 2d 609; 83 U.S.L.W. 4592; 2015 WL 2473451; 2015 U.S. LEXIS 4250; 2015 BL 204553
- Argument: Oral argument
- Opinion announcement: Opinion announcement
- Decision: Opinion

Case history
- Prior: District court decisions, each siding with the plaintiffs: Obergefell v. Wymyslo 962 F. Supp. 2d 968 (S.D. Ohio 2013); Henry v. Wymyslo (S.D. Ohio 2014).; Tanco v. Haslam, 7 F. Supp. 3d 759 (M.D. Tenn. 2014); stay granted, No. 14-5297 (6th Cir. Apr. 25, 2014).; DeBoer v. Snyder, 973 F. Supp. 2d 757 (E.D. Mich. 2014).; Bourke v. Beshear, 996 F. Supp. 2d 542 (W.D. Ky. 2014); Love v. Beshear, 989 F. Supp. 2d 536 (W.D. Ky. 2014).; Cases reversed, DeBoer v. Snyder, 772 F.3d 388 (6th Cir. 2014).; Certiorari granted, 574 U.S. 1118 (2015).

Questions presented
- Does the Fourteenth Amendment require a state to license a marriage between two people of the same sex?; Does the Fourteenth Amendment require a state to recognize a marriage between two people of the same sex when their marriage was lawfully licensed and performed out-of-state?

Holding
- The Fourteenth Amendment requires a State to license a marriage between two people of the same sex and to recognize a marriage between two people of the same sex when their marriage was lawfully licensed and performed out-of-State. The judgment of the Court of Appeals for the Sixth Circuit is reversed. Baker v. Nelson overruled.

Court membership
- Chief Justice John Roberts Associate Justices Antonin Scalia · Anthony Kennedy; Clarence Thomas · Ruth Bader Ginsburg; Stephen Breyer · Samuel Alito; Sonia Sotomayor · Elena Kagan

Case opinions
- Majority: Kennedy, joined by Ginsburg, Breyer, Sotomayor, Kagan
- Dissent: Roberts, joined by Scalia, Thomas
- Dissent: Scalia, joined by Thomas
- Dissent: Thomas, joined by Scalia
- Dissent: Alito, joined by Scalia, Thomas

Laws applied
- U.S. Const. amend. XIV
- This case overturned a previous ruling or rulings
- Baker v. Nelson (1971) (Note: Although most appeals courts did not consider Baker binding precedent, the Sixth Circuit had held that it was binding on lower courts.)

Obergefell v. Hodges, 576 U.S. 644 (2015) (/ˈoʊbərɡəfɛl/ OH-bər-gə-fel), is a landmark decision of the United States Supreme Court which ruled that the fundamental right to marry is guaranteed to same-sex couples by both the Due Process Clause and the Equal Protection Clause of the Fourteenth Amendment to the United States Constitution. The 5–4 ruling requires all 50 states, the District of Columbia, and the Insular Areas under U.S. sovereignty to perform and recognize the marriages of same-sex couples on the same terms and conditions as the marriages of opposite-sex couples, with equal rights and responsibilities. Prior to Obergefell, same-sex marriage had already been established by statute, court ruling, or voter initiative in 36 states, the District of Columbia, and Guam.

Between January 2012 and February 2014, plaintiffs in Michigan, Ohio, Kentucky, and Tennessee filed federal district court cases that culminated in Obergefell v. Hodges. After all district courts ruled for the plaintiffs, the rulings were appealed to the Sixth Circuit. In November 2014, following a series of appeals court rulings that year from the Fourth, Seventh, Ninth, and Tenth Circuits that state-level bans on same-sex marriage were unconstitutional, the Sixth Circuit ruled that it was bound by Baker v. Nelson and found such bans to be constitutional. This created a split between circuits and led to a Supreme Court review. Decided on June 26, 2015, Obergefell overturned Baker and requires states to issue marriage licenses to same-sex couples and to recognize same-sex marriages validly performed in other jurisdictions. This established same-sex marriage throughout the United States and its territories. In a majority opinion authored by Justice Anthony Kennedy, the Court examined the nature of fundamental rights guaranteed to all by the Constitution, the harm done to individuals by delaying the implementation of such rights while the democratic process plays out, and the evolving understanding of discrimination and inequality that has developed greatly since Baker.

== Lawsuits in the district courts ==
The U.S. Supreme Court case of Obergefell v. Hodges is not the culmination of one lawsuit. Ultimately, it is the consolidation of six lower-court cases, originally representing sixteen same-sex couples, seven of their children, a widower, an adoption agency, and a funeral director. Those cases came from Michigan, Ohio, Kentucky, and Tennessee. All six federal district court rulings found for the same-sex couples and other claimants.

=== Michigan case: DeBoer v. Snyder ===
One case came from Michigan, involving a female couple and their three children. April DeBoer and Jayne Rowse held a commitment ceremony in February 2007. They were foster parents. A son was born on January 25, 2009, and adopted by Rowse in November. A daughter was born on February 1, 2010, and adopted by DeBoer in April 2011. A second son was born on November 9, 2009, and adopted by Rowse in October 2011. Michigan law allowed adoption only by single people or married couples. Consequently, on January 23, 2012, DeBoer and Rowse filed a lawsuit in the United States District Court for the Eastern District of Michigan (Southern Division, Detroit), DeBoer v. Snyder, alleging Michigan's adoption law was unconstitutional. Richard Snyder, the lead defendant, was then governor of Michigan.

During a hearing on August 29, 2012, Judge Bernard A. Friedman expressed reservations regarding plaintiffs' cause of action, suggesting they amend their complaint to challenge the state's ban on same-sex marriage. The plaintiffs amended their complaint accordingly on September 7. During a hearing on March 7, 2013, Friedman decided to delay the case until the U.S. Supreme Court ruled in United States v. Windsor and Hollingsworth v. Perry, hoping for guidance. On October 16, Friedman set trial for February 25, 2014. The trial ended March 7. On March 21, Friedman ruled for the plaintiffs, concluding that, "without some overriding legitimate interest, the state cannot use its domestic relations authority to legislate families out of existence. Having failed to establish such an interest in the context of same-sex marriage, the [state marriage ban] cannot stand."

=== Ohio cases ===
==== Obergefell v. Kasich ====
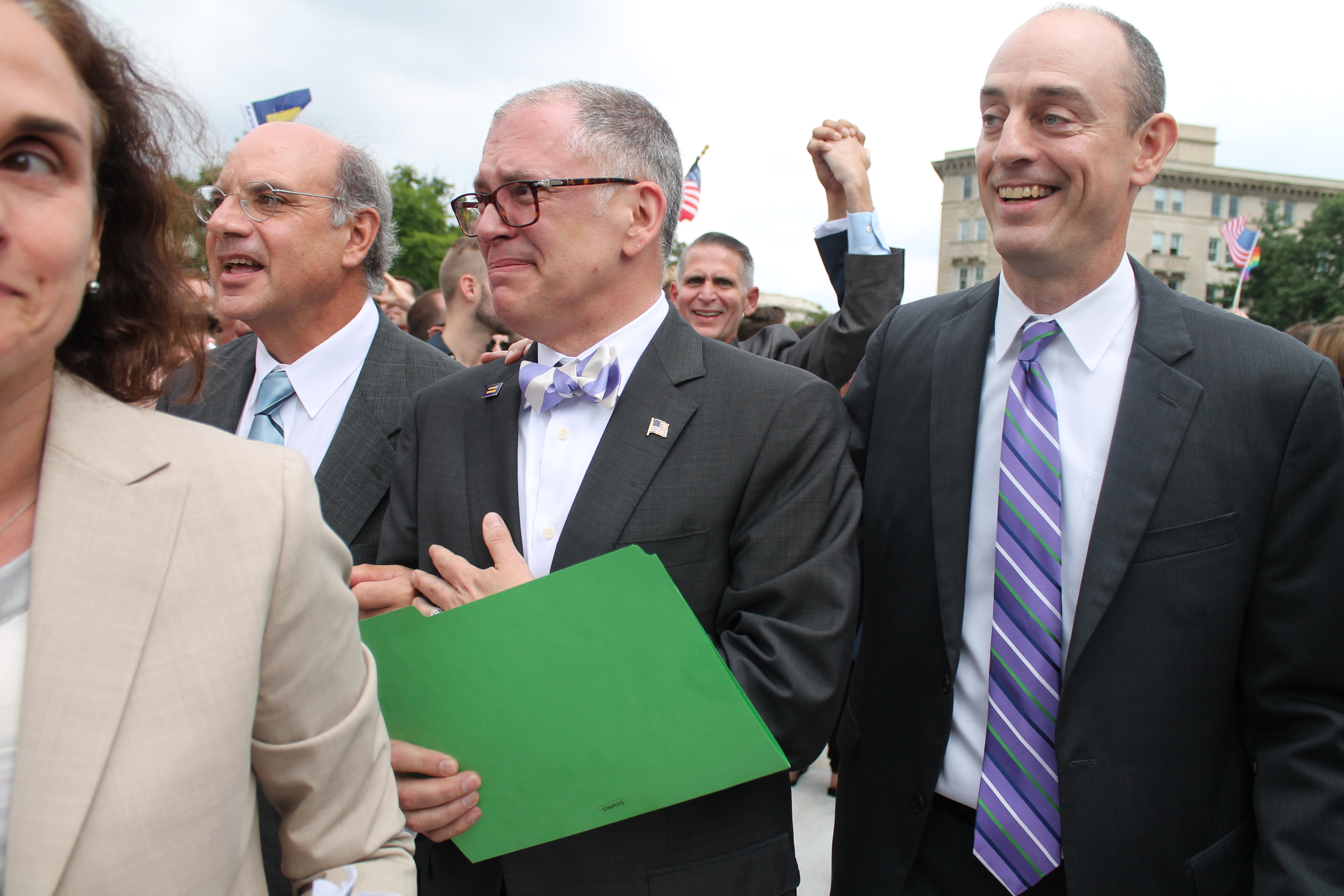
Outside the Supreme Court on the morning of June 26, 2015, James Obergefell (foreground, center) and attorney Al Gerhardstein (foreground, left) react to its historic decision.

Two cases came from Ohio, the first ultimately involving a male couple, a widower, and a funeral director. In June 2013, following the U.S. Supreme Court's decision in United States v. Windsor, James "Jim" Obergefell and John Arthur decided to marry to obtain legal recognition of their relationship. They married in Maryland on July 11. After learning that their state of residence, Ohio, would not recognize their marriage, they filed a lawsuit, Obergefell v. Kasich, in the United States District Court for the Southern District of Ohio (Western Division, Cincinnati) on July 19, 2013, alleging that the state discriminates against same-sex couples who have married lawfully out-of-state. The lead defendant was Ohio Governor John Kasich. Because one partner, John Arthur, was terminally ill and suffering from amyotrophic lateral sclerosis (ALS), they wanted the Ohio Registrar to identify the other partner, James Obergefell, as his surviving spouse on his death certificate, based on their marriage in Maryland. The local Ohio Registrar agreed that discriminating against the same-sex married couple was unconstitutional, but the state attorney general's office announced plans to defend Ohio's same-sex marriage ban.

As the case progressed, on July 22, District Judge Timothy S. Black granted the couple's motion, temporarily restraining the Ohio Registrar from accepting any death certificate unless it recorded the deceased's status at death as "married" and his partner as "surviving spouse". Black wrote that "[t]hroughout Ohio's history, Ohio law has been clear: a marriage solemnized outside of Ohio is valid in Ohio if it is valid where solemnized", and noted that certain marriages between cousins or minors, while unlawful if performed in Ohio, are recognized by the state if lawful when solemnized in other jurisdictions. Ohio Attorney General Mike DeWine indicated he would not appeal the preliminary order. On August 13, Black extended the temporary restraining order until the end of December and scheduled oral arguments on injunctive relief, which is permanent, for December 18.

Meanwhile, on July 22, 2013, David Michener and William Herbert Ives married in Delaware. They had three adoptive children. On August 27, William Ives died unexpectedly in Cincinnati, Ohio. His remains were being held at a Cincinnati funeral home pending the issuance of a death certificate, required before cremation, the deceased's desired funeral rite. As surviving spouse David Michener's name could not by Ohio law appear on the death certificate, he sought legal remedy, being added as a plaintiff in the case on September 3.

As the newly amended case moved forward, on September 25, Black granted a September 19 motion by the plaintiffs to dismiss the governor and the state attorney general as defendants, and to add funeral director Robert Grunn to the lawsuit so that he could obtain clarification of his legal obligations under Ohio law when serving clients with same-sex spouses, such as his client James Obergefell. Ohio Health Department Director Theodore Wymyslo was substituted as the lead defendant, and the case was restyled Obergefell v. Wymyslo. On October 22, plaintiff John Arthur died. The state defendants moved to dismiss the case as moot. Judge Black, in an order dated November 1, denied the motion to dismiss. On December 23, Judge Black ruled that Ohio's refusal to recognize same-sex marriages from other jurisdictions was discriminatory and ordered Ohio to recognize same-sex marriages from other jurisdictions on death certificates. He wrote, "When a state effectively terminates the marriage of a same-sex couple married in another jurisdiction, it intrudes into the realm of private marital, family, and intimate relations specifically protected by the Supreme Court."

==== Henry v. Wymyslo ====
The second case from Ohio involved four couples, a child, and an adoption agency. Georgia Nicole Yorksmith and Pamela Yorksmith married in California on October 14, 2008. They had a son in 2010 and were expecting another child. In 2011, Kelly Noe and Kelly McCraken married in Massachusetts. Joseph J. Vitale and Robert Talmas married in New York on September 20, 2011. In 2013, they sought the services of the adoption agency Adoption S.T.A.R., finally adopting a son on January 17, 2014, the same day Brittani Henry and Brittni Rogers married in New York. They, too, were expecting a son. The three female couples were living in Ohio, each anticipating the birth of a child later in 2014. Vitale and Talmas were living in New York with their adopted son, Child Doe, born in Ohio in 2013 and also a plaintiff through his parents. On February 10, 2014, the four legally married couples filed a lawsuit, Henry v. Wymyslo, also in the United States District Court for the Southern District of Ohio (Western Division, Cincinnati), to force the state to list both parents on their children's birth certificates. Adoption S.T.A.R. sued due to the added and inadequate services Ohio law forced it to provide to same-sex parents adopting in the state. Theodore Wymyslo, the lead defendant, was then director of the Ohio Department of Health.

As the case moved forward, the plaintiffs amended their complaint to ask the court to declare Ohio's recognition ban on same-sex marriage unconstitutional. Judge Black gave the state time to prepare its appeal of his decision by announcing on April 4 that he would issue an order on April 14 requiring Ohio to recognize same-sex marriages from other jurisdictions. Following the resignation of the lead defendant, Ohio's director of health, Ted Wymyslo, for reasons unrelated to the case, Lance Himes became interim director, and the case was restyled Henry v. Himes. On April 14, Black ruled that Ohio must recognize same-sex marriages from other jurisdictions, and, on April 16, stayed enforcement of his ruling, except for the birth certificates sought by the plaintiffs.

=== Kentucky cases ===
==== Bourke v. Beshear ====
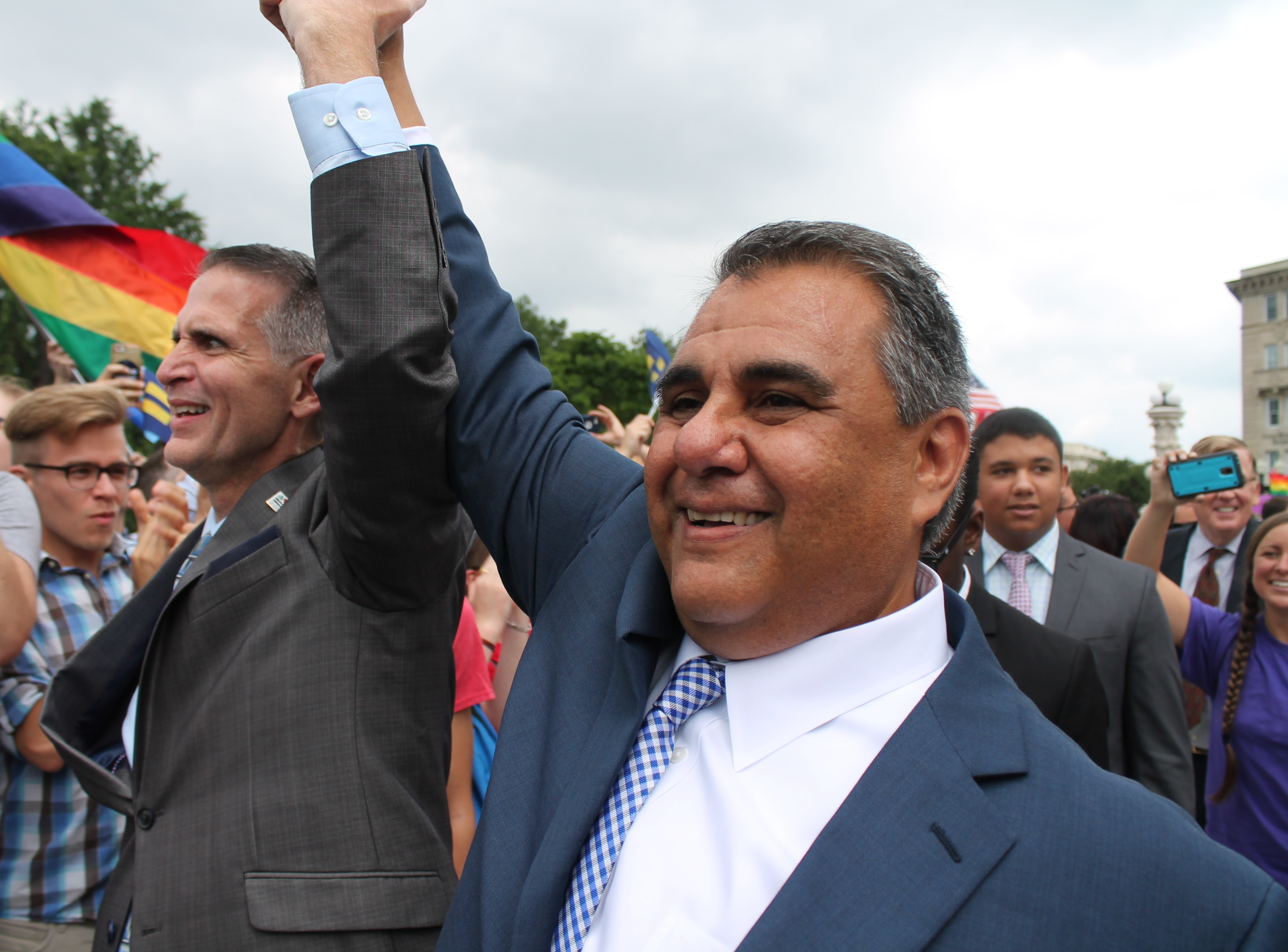
Plaintiffs Gregory Bourke (left) and Michael DeLeon (right) celebrate outside the Supreme Court building on June 26, 2015.

Two cases came from Kentucky, the first ultimately involving four same-sex couples and their six children. Gregory Bourke and Michael DeLeon married in Ontario, Canada, on March 29, 2004. They had two children: Plaintiff I.D., a fourteen-year-old girl, and Plaintiff I.D., a fifteen-year-old boy. Randell Johnson and Paul Campion married in California on July 3, 2008. They had four children: Plaintiffs T.J.-C. and T.J.-C., twin eighteen-year-old boys, Plaintiff D.J.-C., a fourteen-year-old boy, and Plaintiff M.J.-C., a ten-year-old girl. Jimmy Meade and Luther Barlowe married in Iowa on July 30, 2009. Kimberly Franklin and Tamera Boyd married in Connecticut on July 15, 2010. All resided in Kentucky. On July 26, 2013, Bourke and DeLeon, and their two children through them, filed a lawsuit, Bourke v. Beshear, in the United States District Court for the Western District of Kentucky (Louisville Division), challenging Kentucky's bans on same-sex marriage and the recognition of same-sex marriages from other jurisdictions. Steve Beshear, the lead defendant, was then governor of Kentucky.

Subsequently, on August 16, the complaint was amended to bring Johnson and Campion, their four children through them, and Meade and Barlowe into the case, again challenging the state's bans on same-sex marriage and the recognition of same-sex marriages from other jurisdictions. On November 1, the complaint was amended again to bring Franklin and Boyd into the case, now challenging only Kentucky's ban on the recognition of same-sex marriages from other jurisdictions. Originally, the couple had filed their own lawsuit, Franklin v. Beshear, with the United States District Court for the Eastern District of Kentucky, but a change of venue was ordered for convenience, with the intent formally to consolidate the case with Bourke. Consolidation never occurred, and that separate case was dismissed for failure to raise new claims. On February 12, 2014, Judge John G. Heyburn II issued the court's decision: "In the end, the Court concludes that Kentucky's denial of recognition for valid same-sex marriages violates the United States Constitution's guarantee of equal protection under the law, even under the most deferential standard of review. Accordingly, Kentucky's statutes and constitutional amendment that mandate this denial are unconstitutional."

==== Love v. Beshear ====
The second case from Kentucky, Love v. Beshear, involved two male couples. Maurice Blanchard and Dominique James held a religious marriage ceremony on June 3, 2006. Kentucky county clerks repeatedly refused them marriage licenses. Timothy Love and Lawrence Ysunza had been living together as a couple for thirty years when, on February 13, 2014, they were refused a marriage license at the Jefferson County Clerk's office. On February 14, the next day, the couples submitted a motion to join Bourke v. Beshear, challenging the state's ban on same-sex marriage. The motion was granted on February 27, and the case was bifurcated and was restyled as Love v. Beshear, on February 28. On July 1, 2014, Judge Heyburn issued his ruling. He found "homosexual persons constitute a quasi-suspect class", and ordered that Kentucky's laws banning same-sex marriage "violate the Equal Protection Clause of the Fourteenth Amendment to the United States Constitution, and they are void and unenforceable." In the course of assessing the state's arguments for the bans, he stated, "These arguments are not those of serious people."

=== Tennessee case: Tanco v. Haslam ===
One case came from Tennessee, involving four same-sex couples. Joy "Johno" Espejo and Matthew Mansell married in California on August 5, 2008. On September 25, 2009, they adopted two foster children. After Mansell's job was transferred to the state, they relocated to Franklin, Tennessee, in May 2012. Kellie Miller and Vanessa DeVillez married in New York on July 24, 2011, later moving to Tennessee. Army Reservist Sergeant First Class Ijpe DeKoe and Thomas Kostura married in New York on August 4, 2011. In May 2012, after completing a tour of duty in Afghanistan, Sergeant DeKoe was restationed in Memphis, Tennessee, where the couple subsequently relocated. On September 3, 2013, the Department of Defense began recognizing their marriage, but the state did not. Valeria Tanco and Sophia Jesty married in New York on September 9, 2011, then moved to Tennessee, where they were university professors. They were expecting their first child in 2014. On October 21, 2013, wishing to have their out-of-state marriages recognized in Tennessee, the four couples filed a lawsuit, Tanco v. Haslam, in the United States District Court for the Middle District of Tennessee (Nashville Division). William Edwards Haslam, the lead defendant, was then governor of Tennessee.

As the case progressed, on November 19, 2013, the plaintiffs moved for a preliminary injunction enjoining the state from applying its marriage recognition ban against them. On March 10, 2014, plaintiff couple Kellie Miller and Vanessa DeVillez withdrew from the case. On March 14, Judge Aleta Arthur Trauger granted a preliminary injunction requiring the state to recognize the marriages of the three plaintiff couples. She wrote, "At this point, all signs indicate that, in the eyes of the United States Constitution, the plaintiffs' marriages will be placed on an equal footing with those of heterosexual couples and that proscriptions against same-sex marriage will soon become a footnote in the annals of American history." The state immediately filed a motion to stay this ruling, but, on March 20, Judge Trauger denied the request, reasoning that "the court's order does not open the floodgates for same-sex couples to marry in Tennessee ... [and] applies only to the three same-sex couples at issue in this case."

== Reversal by the Sixth Circuit ==
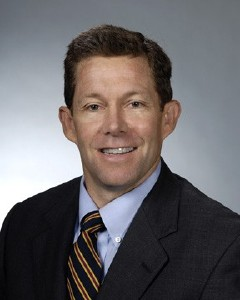
Judge Jeffrey Sutton wrote the Sixth Circuit's majority opinion upholding same-sex marriage bans, causing the circuit split that helped trigger Supreme Court review.

The six decisions of the four federal district courts were appealed to the United States Court of Appeals for the Sixth Circuit. Ohio's director of health appealed Obergefell v. Wymyslo on January 16, 2014. The governor of Tennessee appealed Tanco v. Haslam on March 18. On March 21, the governor of Michigan appealed DeBoer v. Snyder. The governor of Kentucky appealed Bourke v. Beshear and Love v. Beshear on March 18 and July 8, respectively. And on May 9 Ohio's director of health appealed Henry v. Himes.

Subsequently, on May 20, the Sixth Circuit consolidated Obergefell v. Himes with Henry v. Himes for the purposes of briefing and oral argument. (On April 15, after Ohio's governor, John Kasich, appointed Lance Himes interim health director on February 21, Obergefell was restyled Obergefell v. Himes.) Upon prior motion by the parties, the Sixth Circuit also consolidated Bourke v. Beshear and Love v. Beshear on July 16. On August 6, the three-judge panel consisting of Judges Jeffrey Sutton, Deborah L. Cook, and Martha Craig Daughtrey heard oral arguments in all four cases. On August 11, Richard Hodges, by the appointment of Ohio governor John Kasich, succeeded Himes as Ohio's health director, and Obergefell was again retitled, this time as its final iteration of Obergefell v. Hodges.

On November 6, 2014, in a decision styled DeBoer v. Snyder, the Sixth Circuit ruled 2–1 that Ohio's ban on same-sex marriage did not violate the U.S. Constitution. The court said it was bound by the U.S. Supreme Court's 1972 action in a similar case, Baker v. Nelson, which dismissed a same-sex couple's marriage claim "for want of a substantial federal question". Writing for the majority, Judge Sutton also dismissed the arguments made on behalf of same-sex couples in this case: "Not one of the plaintiffs' theories, however, makes the case for constitutionalizing the definition of marriage and for removing the issue from the place it has been since the founding: in the hands of state voters."

Dissenting, Judge Daughtrey wrote:

Because the correct result is so obvious, one is tempted to speculate that the majority has purposefully taken the contrary position to create the circuit split regarding the legality of same-sex marriage that could prompt a grant of certiorari by the Supreme Court and an end to the uncertainty of status and the interstate chaos that the current discrepancy in state laws threatens.

== Before the Supreme Court ==
State laws regarding same-sex marriage in the United States prior to Obergefell v. Hodges^{1} Same-sex marriage legal (including by court decision) Same-sex marriage ban overturned, decision stayed indefinitely Same-sex marriage banned where federal circuit court has found similar bans unconstitutional Same-sex marriage banned Same-sex marriage legality complicated^{1} Native American tribal nations have laws pertaining to same-sex marriage independent of state law. The federal government recognizes same-sex marriages, regardless of the current state of residence.

=== Petitions for writs of certiorari ===
Claimants from each of the six district court cases appealed to the Supreme Court of the United States. On November 14, 2014, the same-sex couples, widowers, child plaintiff, and funeral director in DeBoer v. Snyder, Obergefell v. Hodges, and Tanco v. Haslam filed petitions for writs of certiorari with the Court. Adoption agency Adoption S.T.A.R. did not petition. The same-sex couples in Bourke v. Beshear filed their petition for a writ of certiorari with the Court on November 18.

The DeBoer petitioners presented the Court with the question of whether denying same-sex couples the right to marry violated the Fourteenth Amendment. The Obergefell petitioners asked the Court to consider whether Ohio's refusal to recognize marriages from other jurisdictions violated the Fourteenth Amendment's guarantees of due process and equal protection, and whether the state's refusal to recognize the adoption judgment of another state violated the U.S. Constitution's Full Faith and Credit Clause. The Tanco petitioners asked the Court to consider three questions: whether denying same-sex couples the right to marry, including recognition of out-of-state marriages, violated the Due Process or Equal Protections Clauses of the Fourteenth Amendment; whether refusing to recognize their out-of-state marriages violated same-sex couples' right to interstate travel; and whether Baker v. Nelson (1972), summarily dismissing same-sex couples' marriage claims, remained binding precedent. Lastly, the Bourke petitioners posed to the Court two questions: whether a state violates the Due Process or Equal Protection Clauses of the Fourteenth Amendment by prohibiting same-sex couples to marry, and whether it does so by refusing to recognize out-of-state same-sex marriages.

=== Merits briefs ===
On January 16, 2015, the U.S. Supreme Court consolidated the four same-sex marriage cases challenging state laws that prohibited same-sex marriage—DeBoer v. Snyder (Michigan), Obergefell v. Hodges (Ohio), Bourke v. Beshear (Kentucky), and Tanco v. Haslam (Tennessee)—and agreed to review the case. It set a briefing schedule to be completed April 17. The Court ordered briefing and oral argument on the following questions:

1. Does the Fourteenth Amendment require a state to license a marriage between two people of the same sex?
2. Does the Fourteenth Amendment require a state to recognize a marriage between two people of the same sex when their marriage was lawfully licensed and performed out-of-state?

The Court also told the parties to each of the four cases to address only the questions raised in their particular case. Thus, Obergefell raises only the second question, the recognition of same-sex marriages from other jurisdictions.

The case had 148 amici curiae briefs submitted, more than any other U.S. Supreme Court case, including a historic amicus brief, written by Morgan Lewis partner Susan Baker Manning, on behalf of 379 business entities, which stated a business case for legalizing same-sex marriage across the country.

=== Oral argument ===
Oral arguments in the case were heard on April 28, 2015. The plaintiffs were represented by civil rights lawyer Mary Bonauto, former U.S. Solicitor Ted Olsen and Washington, D.C., lawyer Douglas Hallward-Driemeier. U.S. Solicitor General Donald B. Verrilli Jr., representing the United States, also argued for the same-sex couples. The states were represented by former Michigan Solicitor General John J. Bursch and Joseph R. Whalen, an associate solicitor general from Tennessee. Of the nine justices, all except Clarence Thomas made comments and asked questions, giving clues as to their positions on the Constitution and the future of same-sex marriage. While the questions and comments of the justices during oral arguments are an imperfect indicator of their final decisions, the justices appeared sharply divided in their approaches to this issue, splitting as they often do along ideological lines, with Justice Anthony Kennedy being pivotal. It was thought Chief Justice John Roberts could be pivotal as well. Despite his past views, and his dissent in Windsor, Roberts made comments during oral argument suggesting that the bans in question may constitute sex discrimination. In his opinion, however, he argued that same-sex marriage bans were constitutional.

== Supreme Court decision ==
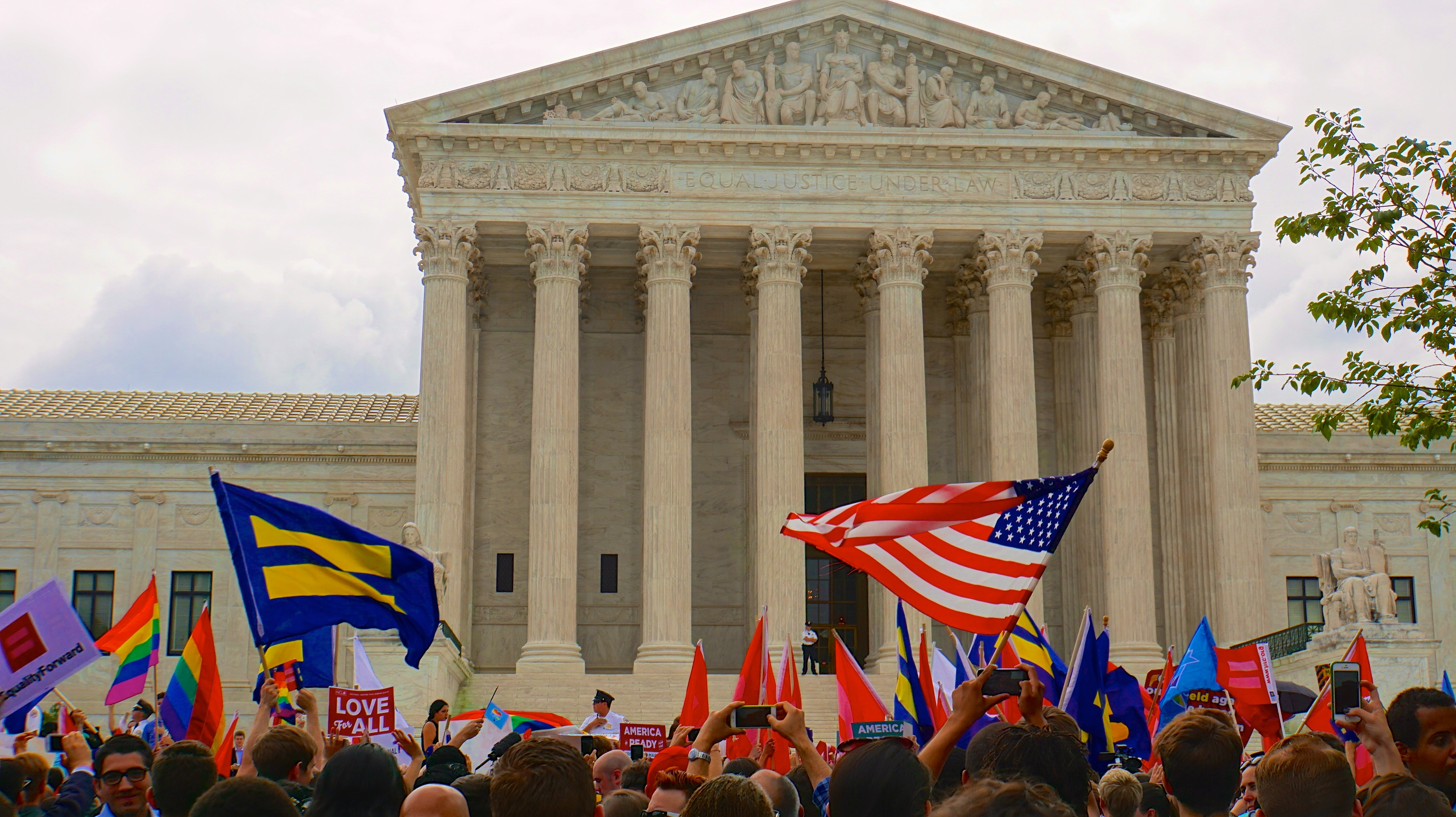
On the morning of June 26, 2015, outside the Supreme Court, the crowd celebrates the Court's decision.

On June 26, 2015, the U.S. Supreme Court held in a 5–4 decision that the Fourteenth Amendment requires all states to grant same-sex marriages and recognize same-sex marriages granted in other states. The Court overruled its prior decision in Baker v. Nelson, which the Sixth Circuit had invoked as precedent.

The Obergefell v. Hodges decision came on the second anniversary of the United States v. Windsor ruling that struck down Section 3 of the Defense of Marriage Act (DOMA), which denied federal recognition to same-sex marriages, as being unconstitutional. It also came on the twelfth anniversary of Lawrence v. Texas, which struck down sodomy laws in 13 states. The Obergefell decision was issued on the second-to-last decision day of the Court's term.

The justices' opinions in Obergefell are consistent with their opinions in Windsor which rejected DOMA's recognition of only opposite-sex marriages for certain purposes under federal law. In both cases, Justice Kennedy authored the majority opinions and was considered the "swing vote".

Chief Justice Roberts and Justices Scalia, Thomas, and Alito each wrote a separate dissenting opinion. The Chief Justice read part of his dissenting opinion from the bench, his first time doing so since joining the Court in 2005.

=== Majority opinion ===
Opinion announcement
Justice Kennedy reads a summary of his majority opinion.

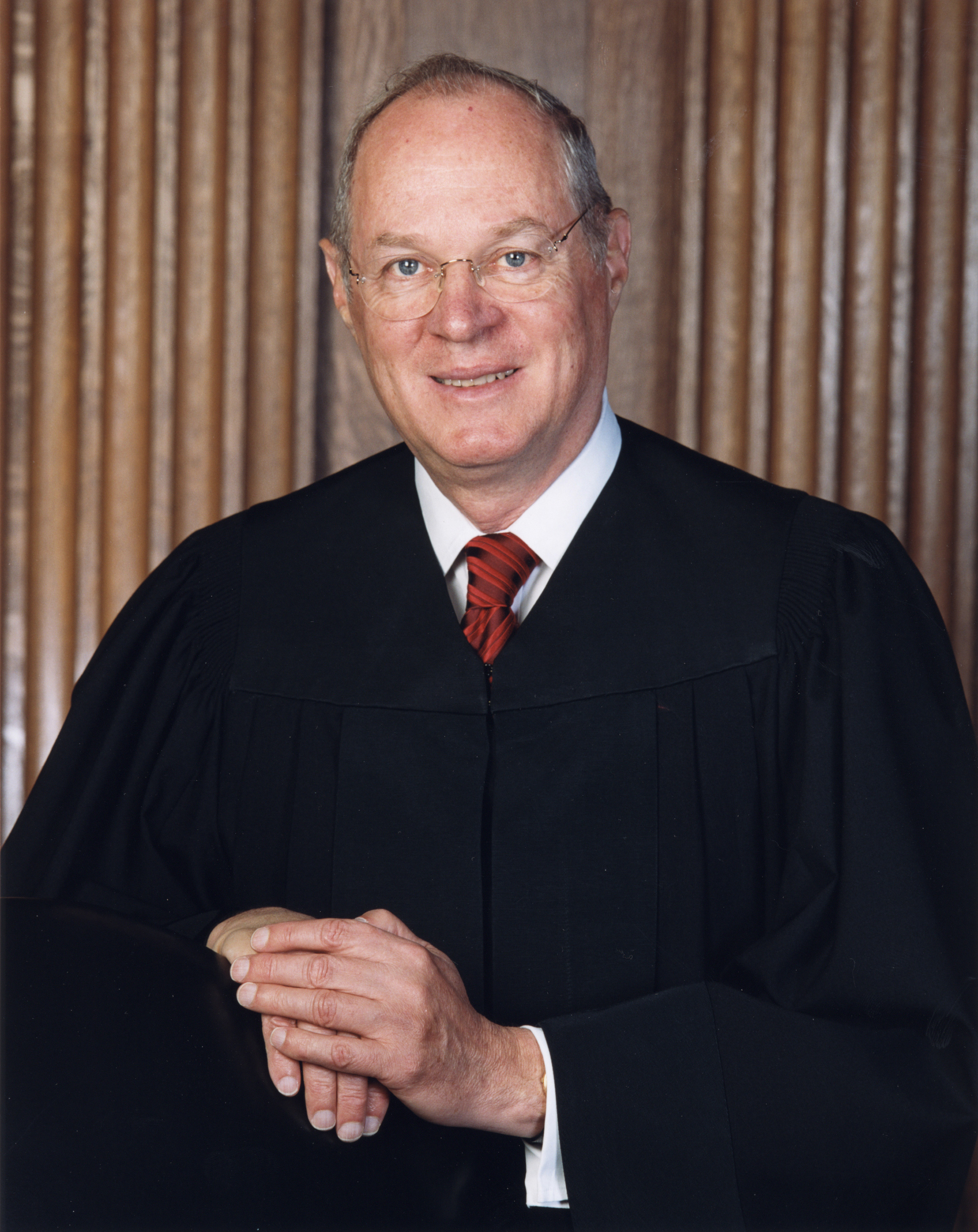
Justice Anthony Kennedy authored the Court's opinion declaring same-sex couples have the right to marry.

Justice Anthony Kennedy authored the majority opinion and was joined by Justices Ruth Bader Ginsburg, Stephen Breyer, Sonia Sotomayor, and Elena Kagan. The majority held that state same-sex marriage bans are a violation of the Fourteenth Amendment's Due Process and Equal Protection Clauses.

"The Constitution promises liberty to all within its reach," the Court declared, "a liberty that includes certain specific rights that allow persons, within a lawful realm, to define and express their identity." Citing Griswold v. Connecticut, the Court affirmed that the fundamental rights found in the Fourteenth Amendment's Due Process Clause "extend to certain personal choices central to individual dignity and autonomy, including intimate choices that define personal identity and beliefs," but the "identification and protection" of these fundamental rights "has not been reduced to any formula." As the Supreme Court has found in cases such as Loving v. Virginia, Zablocki v. Redhail, and Turner v. Safley, this extension includes a fundamental right to marry.

The Court rejected respondent states' framing of the issue as whether there were a "right to same-sex marriage," (Note: The dissenting justices framed the issue similarly, but not necessarily using the same language. See the dissenting opinions below.) insisting its precedents "inquired about the right to marry in its comprehensive sense, asking if there was a sufficient justification for excluding the relevant class from the right." Addressing the formula in Washington v. Glucksberg that fundamental rights had to be "deeply rooted" in the nation's history and traditions, the Court said that it is "inconsistent with the approach this Court has used" in Loving, Turner, and Zablocki. It continued, "If rights were defined by who exercised them in the past, then received practices could serve as their own continued justification and new groups could not invoke rights once denied." Citing its prior decisions in Loving and Lawrence v. Texas, the Court framed the issue accordingly in Obergefell.

The Court listed four distinct reasons why the fundamental right to marry applies to same-sex couples, citing United States v. Windsor in support throughout its discussion. First, "the right to personal choice regarding marriage is inherent in the concept of individual autonomy." Second, "the right to marry is fundamental because it supports a two-person union unlike any other in its importance to the committed individuals," a principle applying equally to same-sex couples. Third, the fundamental right to marry "safeguards children and families and thus draws meaning from related rights of childrearing, procreation, and education"; as same-sex couples have children and families, they are deserving of this safeguard—though the right to marry in the United States has never been conditioned on procreation. Fourth, and lastly, "marriage is a keystone of our social order," and "[t]here is no difference between same- and opposite-sex couples with respect to this principle"; consequently, preventing same-sex couples from marrying puts them at odds with society, denies them countless benefits of marriage, and introduces instability into their relationships for no justifiable reason.

The Court noted the relationship between the liberty of the Due Process Clause and the equality of the Equal Protection Clause and determined that same-sex marriage bans violated the latter. Concluding that the liberty and equality of same-sex couples was significantly burdened, the Court struck down same-sex marriage bans for violating both clauses, holding that same-sex couples may exercise the fundamental right to marry in all fifty states "on the same terms and conditions as opposite-sex couples."

Due to the "substantial and continuing harm" and the "instability and uncertainty" caused by state marriage laws differing with regard to same-sex couples, and because respondent states had conceded that a ruling requiring them to marry same-sex couples would undermine their refusal to hold valid same-sex marriages performed in other states, the Court also held that states must recognize same-sex marriages legally performed in other states.

Addressing respondent states' argument, the Court emphasized that, while the democratic process may be an appropriate means for deciding issues such as same-sex marriage, no individual has to rely solely on the democratic process to exercise a fundamental right. "An individual can invoke a right to constitutional protection when he or she is harmed, even if the broader public disagrees and even if the legislature refuses to act," for "fundamental rights may not be submitted to a vote; they depend on the outcome of no elections." Furthermore, to rule against same-sex couples in this case, letting the democratic process play out as "a cautious approach to recognizing and protecting fundamental rights" would harm same-sex couples in the interim.

Additionally, the Court rejected the notion that allowing same-sex couples to marry harms the institution of marriage, leading to fewer opposite-sex marriages through a severing of the link between procreation and marriage, calling the notion "counterintuitive" and "unrealistic". Instead, the Court stated that married same-sex couples "would pose no risk of harm to themselves or third parties". The majority also stressed that the First Amendment protects those who disagree with same-sex marriage.

In closing, Justice Kennedy wrote for the Court:

No union is more profound than marriage, for it embodies the highest ideals of love, fidelity, devotion, sacrifice, and family. In forming a marital union, two people become something greater than once they were. As some of the petitioners in these cases demonstrate, marriage embodies a love that may endure even past death. It would misunderstand these men and women to say they disrespect the idea of marriage. Their plea is that they do respect it, respect it so deeply that they seek to find its fulfillment for themselves. Their hope is not to be condemned to live in loneliness, excluded from one of civilization's oldest institutions. They ask for equal dignity in the eyes of the law. The Constitution grants them that right.

=== Dissenting opinions ===
==== Chief Justice Roberts ====
Oral dissent
Chief Justice Roberts delivers his dissent.

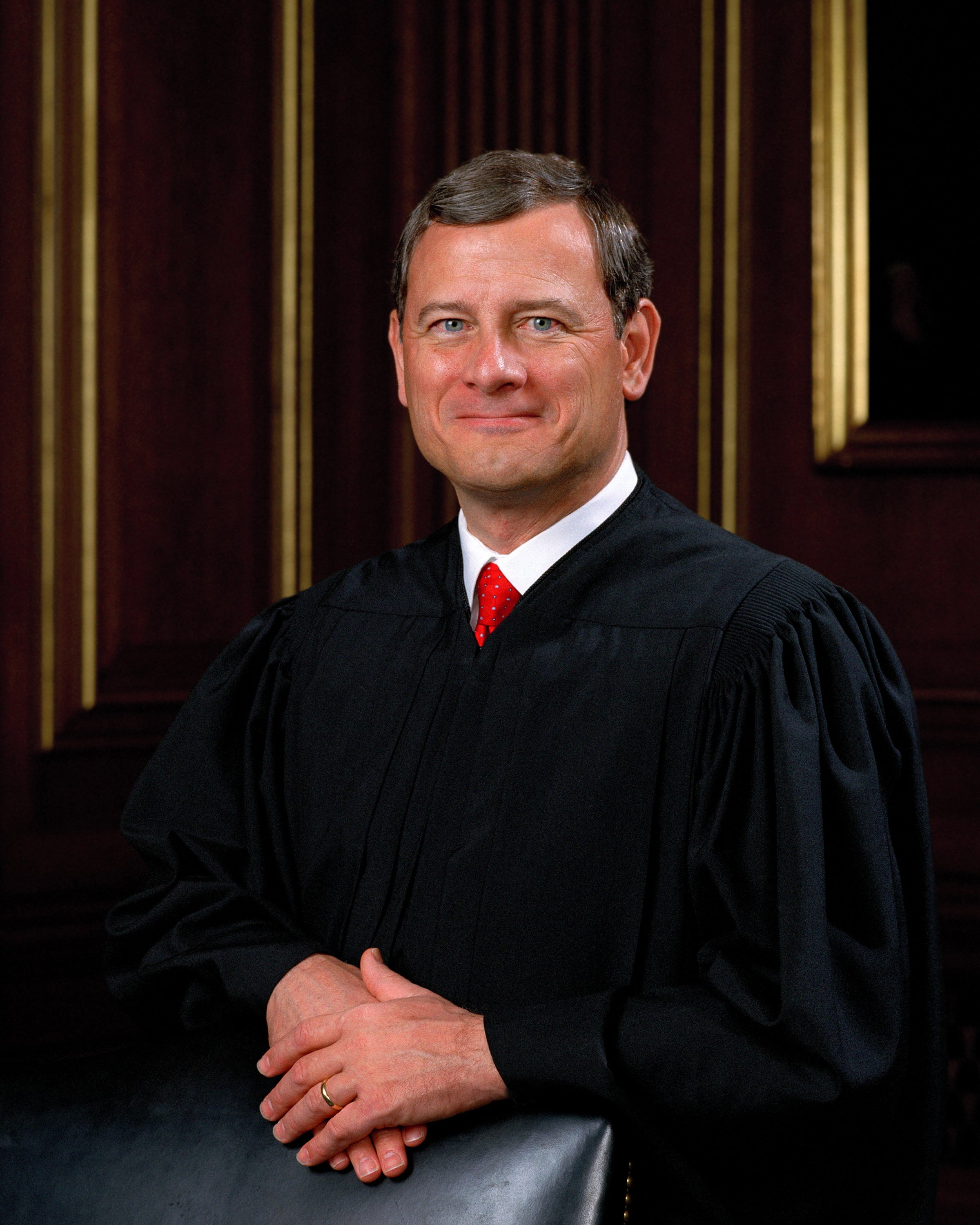
In his dissent, Chief Justice John Roberts argued same-sex marriage bans did not violate the Constitution.

Chief Justice John Roberts wrote a dissenting opinion, which was joined by Justices Scalia and Thomas. Roberts accepted substantive due process, by which fundamental rights are protected through the Due Process Clause, but warned it has been misused over time to expand perceived fundamental rights, particularly in Dred Scott v. Sandford (1857) and Lochner v. New York (1905). Roberts stated that no prior decision had changed the core component of marriage, that it be between one man and one woman; consequently, same-sex marriage bans did not violate the Due Process Clause. Roberts also rejected the notion that same-sex marriage bans violated a right to privacy, because they involved no government intrusion or subsequent punishment. Addressing the Equal Protection Clause, Roberts stated that same-sex marriage bans did not violate the clause because they were rationally related to a governmental interest: preserving the traditional definition of marriage.

More generally, Roberts stated that marriage, which he proposed had a "universal definition" as union "between a man and a woman", arose to ensure successful childrearing. Roberts criticized the majority opinion for relying on moral convictions rather than a constitutional basis, and for expanding fundamental rights without caution or regard for history. He also suggested the majority opinion could be used to expand marriage to include legalized polygamy. Roberts chided the majority for overriding the democratic process and for using the judiciary in a way that was not originally intended. According to Roberts, supporters of same-sex marriage cannot win "true acceptance" for their side because the debate has now been closed. Roberts also suggested the majority's opinion will ultimately lead to consequences for religious liberty, and he found the Court's language unfairly attacks opponents of same-sex marriage.

==== Justice Scalia ====
Justice Antonin Scalia wrote a dissenting opinion, which was joined by Justice Thomas. Scalia stated that the Court's decision effectively robs the people of "the freedom to govern themselves", noting that a rigorous debate on same-sex marriage had been taking place and that, by deciding the issue nationwide, the democratic process had been unduly halted. Addressing the claimed Fourteenth Amendment violation, Scalia asserted that, because a same-sex marriage ban would not have been considered unconstitutional at the time of the Fourteenth Amendment's adoption, such bans are not unconstitutional today. He claimed there was "no basis" for the Court's decision striking down legislation that the Fourteenth Amendment does not expressly forbid, and directly attacked the majority opinion for "lacking even a thin veneer of law".

Lastly, Scalia faulted the actual writing in the opinion for "diminish[ing] this Court's reputation for clear thinking and sober analysis" and for "descend[ing] from the disciplined legal reasoning of John Marshall and Joseph Story to the mystical aphorisms of the fortune cookie." In his 2025 memoir, Kennedy claimed that the other conservative justices unsuccessfully asked Scalia to moderate his tone, prompting Roberts to write the chief dissent.

==== Justice Thomas ====
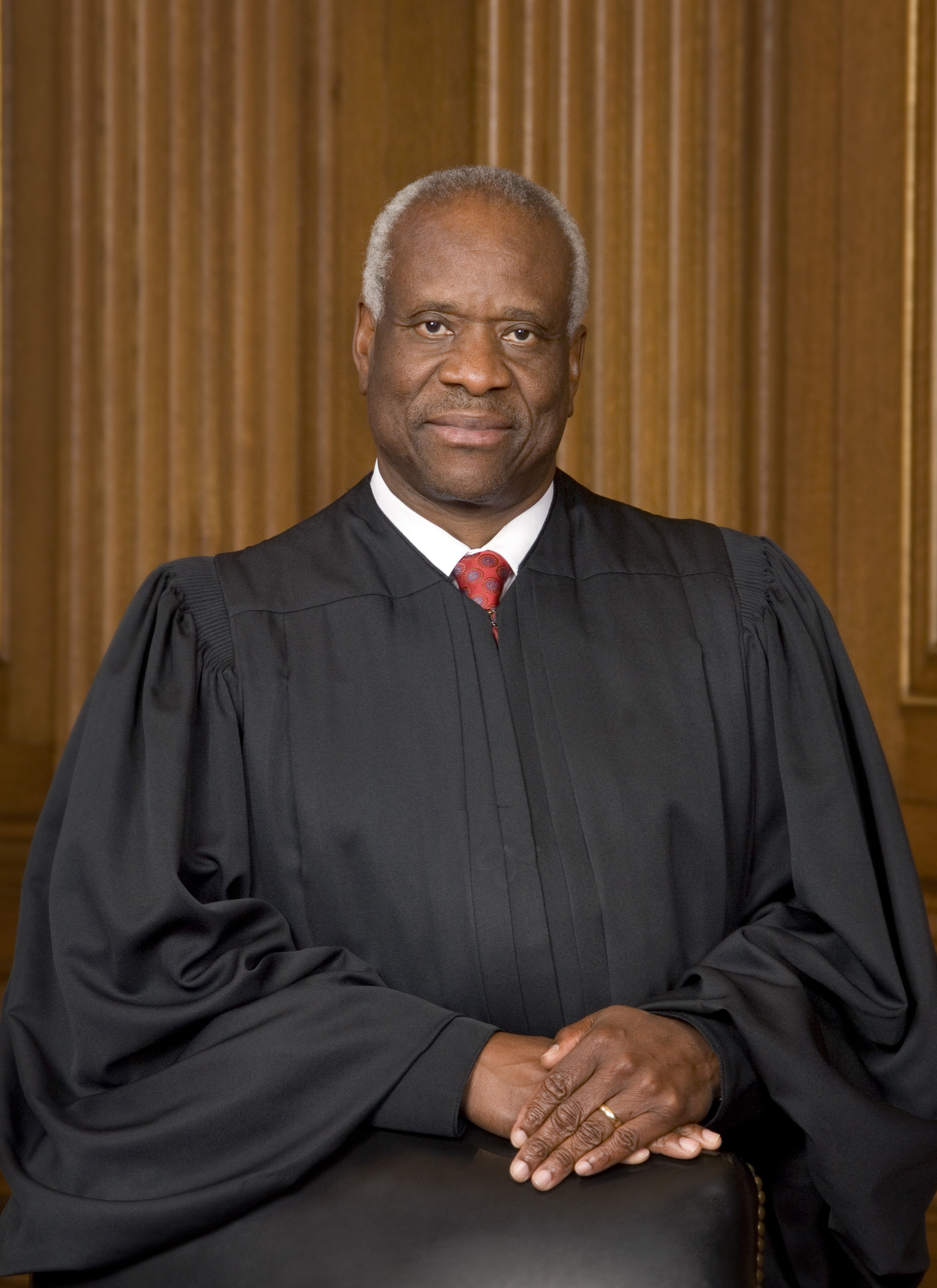
Justice Clarence Thomas wrote a dissent rejecting substantive due process.

Justice Clarence Thomas wrote a dissenting opinion, which was joined by Justice Scalia. Thomas rejected the principle of substantive due process, which he claimed "invites judges to do exactly what the majority has done here—roam at large in the constitutional field guided only by their personal views as to the fundamental rights protected by that document"; in doing so, the judiciary strays from the Constitution's text, subverts the democratic process, and "exalts judges at the expense of the People from whom they derive their authority." Thomas argued that the only liberty that falls under Due Process Clause protection is freedom from "physical restraint". Furthermore, Thomas insisted that "liberty has long been understood as individual freedom from governmental action, not as a right to a particular governmental entitlement" such as a marriage license. According to Thomas, the majority's holding also undermines the political process and threatens religious liberty. Lastly, Thomas took issue with the majority's view that marriage advances the dignity of same-sex couples. In his view, government is not capable of bestowing dignity; rather, dignity is a natural right that is innate within every person, a right that cannot be taken away even through slavery and internment camps.

==== Justice Alito ====
Justice Samuel Alito wrote a dissenting opinion, which was joined by Justices Scalia and Thomas. Invoking Glucksberg, in which the Court stated the Due Process Clause protects only rights and liberties that are "deeply rooted in this Nation's history and tradition", Alito claimed any "right" to same-sex marriage would not meet this definition; he chided the justices in the majority for going against judicial precedent and long-held tradition. Alito defended the rationale of the states, accepting the premise that same-sex marriage bans serve to promote procreation and the optimal childrearing environment. Alito expressed concern that the majority's opinion would be used to attack the beliefs of those who disagree with same-sex marriage, who "will risk being labeled as bigots and treated as such by governments, employers, and schools", leading to "bitter and lasting wounds". Expressing concern for judicial abuse, Alito concluded, "Most Americans—understandably—will cheer or lament today's decision because of their views on the issue of same-sex marriage. But all Americans, whatever their thinking on that issue, should worry about what the majority's claim of power portends."

In a 2018 speech at Catholic University of America published in his 2026 book So Ordered, Alito said that the decision in Obergefell was "perhaps the decisive point in our nation's turn against religious liberty." He said "I expressed my worry that equating the expression of certain views with bigotry -- or, if you like, with dignitary harm -- would drive believers out of public life", and indicated that the Court would see a larger number of cases challenging religious liberty. The Court did see many such cases though most were ruled in favor of the religious organizations bringing the case to the Supreme Court.

== Effects ==
=== Initial reactions ===
==== Support ====
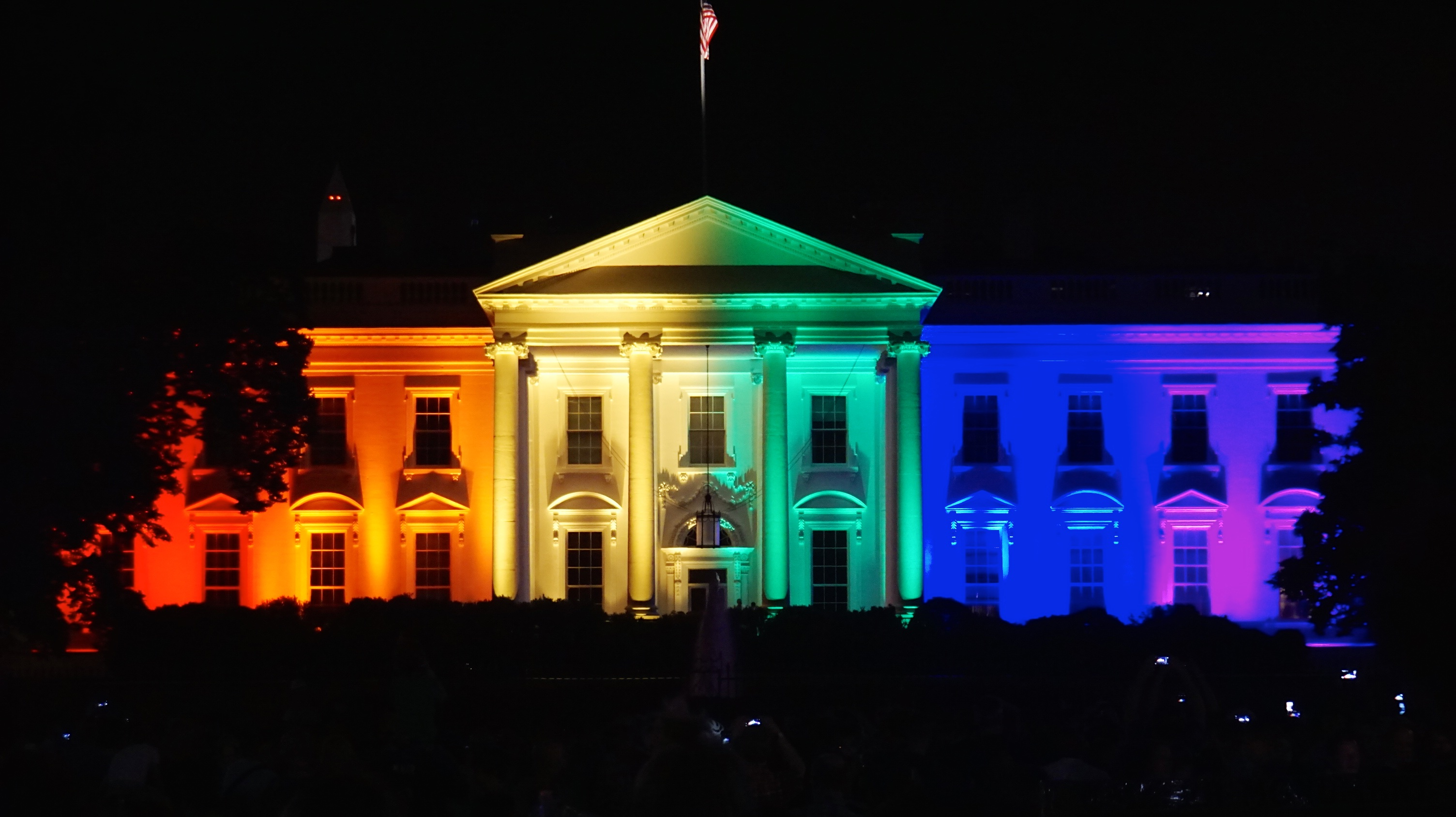
The White House illuminated in rainbow colors, which appear on the LGBTQ+ pride flag, on the evening of the ruling.

James Obergefell, the named plaintiff in Obergefell who sought to put his name on his husband's Ohio death certificate as surviving spouse, said, "Today's ruling from the Supreme Court affirms what millions across the country already know to be true in our hearts: that our love is equal." He expressed his hope that the term gay marriage would soon be a thing of the past and henceforth only be known as marriage. President Barack Obama praised the decision and called it a "victory for America".

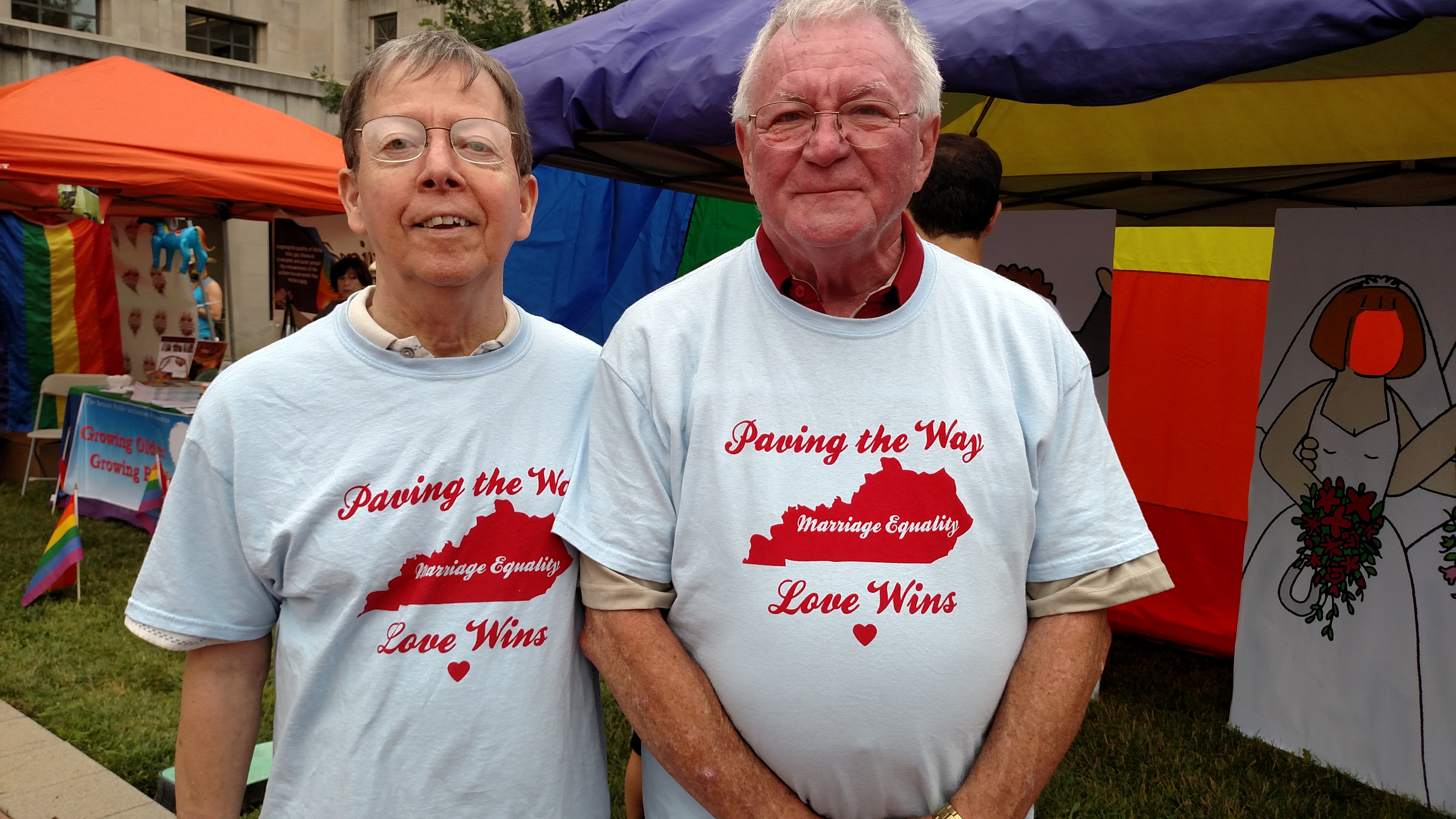
Plaintiffs Jimmy Meade (left) and Luke Barlowe (right) celebrate at Lexington Pride Festival, Lexington, Kentucky, on the day after the Obergefell ruling.

Hundreds of companies reacted positively to the Supreme Court decision by temporarily modifying their company logos on social media to include rainbows or other messages of support for the legalization of same-sex marriage. Jubilant supporters went to social media, public rallies, and Pride parades to celebrate the ruling. Media commentators highlighted the above-quoted passage from Kennedy's decision as a key statement countering many of the arguments put forth by same-sex marriage opponents and mirroring similar language in the 1967 decision in Loving v. Virginia, which abolished bans on inter-racial marriages, and the 1965 decision in Griswold v. Connecticut, which affirmed married couples have a right of privacy. The paragraph was frequently repeated on social media after the ruling was reported.

In 2015, due to the ruling, Justice Anthony Kennedy and the other justices of the Supreme Court were chosen as The Advocate's People of the Year.

==== Opposition ====
Conversely, Texas Attorney General Ken Paxton called the Court's decision a "lawless ruling" and pledged free legal defense of state workers who refuse to marry couples on religious grounds. In a tweet, former Governor of Arkansas and then Republican candidate for the 2016 presidential election Mike Huckabee wrote, "This flawed, failed decision is an out-of-control act of unconstitutional judicial tyranny." Austin R. Nimocks, senior counsel for the Alliance Defending Freedom, a group that opposes same-sex marriage, accused the Court's majority of undermining freedom of speech, saying that "five lawyers took away the voices of more than 300 million Americans to continue to debate the most important social institution in the history of the world. . . . Nobody has the right to say that a mom or a woman or a dad or a man is irrelevant." Some, such as the National Catholic Register and Christianity Today, raised concerns that there may be conflict between the ruling and religious liberty, echoing the arguments made by the dissenting justices.

On May 4, 2017, Republican Governor of Tennessee Bill Haslam signed HB 1111/SB 1085 into law. The bill was seen by the Human Rights Campaign as an attempt to challenge Obergefell v. Hodges.

=== Compliance ===
Though the U.S. Supreme Court legalized same-sex marriage throughout the country in June 2015, there have been numerous counties refusing to issue marriage licenses to otherwise eligible same-sex couples in the states of Alabama, Texas, and Kentucky. Additionally, the overall status of same sex-marriage in the territory of American Samoa remains uncertain.

==== Alabama ====
Alabama counties issuing marriage licenses to all couples (blue) and counties issuing licenses to no one (purple) prior to August 29, 2019

After the ruling in Obergefell, by September 4, 2015, officials in 11 Alabama counties stopped issuing all marriage licenses: Autauga, Bibb, Chambers, Choctaw, Clarke, Cleburne, Covington, Elmore, Geneva, Pike, and Washington.

On January 6, 2016, Alabama's Chief Justice, Roy Moore, issued a ruling forbidding state officials from issuing marriage licenses to same-sex couples; he faced ethics charges for this decree in May of that year and was subsequently suspended for the remainder of his term beginning that September. Following Moore's ruling, the previously listed counties continued to refuse to issue marriage licenses to same-sex couples, while Elmore and Marengo Counties joined in their refusal.

Chambers County began issuing marriage licenses again in June 2016, and so by June 26, 2016, twelve counties were refusing to issue any marriage licenses: Autauga, Bibb, Choctaw, Clarke, Cleburne, Coosa, Covington, Elmore, Geneva, Marengo, Pike and Washington. By October 2016, Bibb, Coosa, and Marengo Counties had begun issuing licenses again, and by June 2017 so had Choctaw County. Until June 2019, eight counties still refused to issue marriage licenses to any couple: Autauga, Clarke, Cleburne, Covington, Elmore, Geneva, Pike and Washington.

At that time, the Alabama Legislature passed a bill that would change state law to replace marriage licenses, which were applications put before a probate court, with marriage certificates, which are given to couples that file the required notarized forms. The bill was signed into law in May 2019 by Alabama Governor Kay Ivey, and it went into effect on August 29, 2019; all eight remaining holdout counties were required to begin issuing marriage certificates, and every county in Alabama is currently issuing marriage certificates to all couples, including otherwise eligible same-sex couples.

==== Texas ====
After the ruling in Obergefell, six Texas counties initially refused to issue same-sex marriage licenses: Hood, Irion, Loving, Mills, Swisher, and Throckmorton. Swisher and Throckmorton Counties began issuing marriage licenses by August 2015, and Loving and Mills Counties followed suit by September 2015. After September 4, 2015, Irion County was the only county that refused to issue marriage licenses, with the county clerk citing grounds of personal religious beliefs. However, following the November 2020 elections, the then newly elected Irion County Clerk agreed to issue marriage licenses to same-sex couples.

==== Kentucky ====
Following the Supreme Court's decision, three Kentucky counties refused to issue marriage licenses to all couples in order to avoid issuing them to same-sex couples: Whitley, Casey, and Rowan. Kim Davis, then the clerk of Rowan County, cited religious exemptions based on the First Amendment to the U.S. Constitution and Section Five of the Kentucky Constitution in her non-issuance of same-sex marriage licenses. In an attempt to mitigate the issue, Kentucky Governor Matt Bevin signed SB-216 into law on April 13, 2016, which replaced the previously separate marriage license forms for opposite-sex and same-sex couples with one form that has an option for gender neutral language. On June 22, 2016, the director of the Kentucky Fairness Campaign, Chris Hartmann, stated that "there are no counties where marriage licenses are being denied" in Kentucky.

==== U.S. territories ====
Guam had been issuing marriage licenses to same-sex couples prior to Obergefell; the territory was already fully compliant with the ruling.

The governor of Puerto Rico announced on June 26, 2015, that the territory would comply with the ruling in Obergefell and same-sex marriage would begin in Puerto Rico within fifteen days. Although same-sex couples began marrying in the territory on July 17, the court battle would continue until April 11, 2016.

On June 29 and June 30, 2015, the governors of the Northern Mariana Islands and the U.S. Virgin Islands, respectively, announced that their territories would comply with Obergefell.

However, it is unclear whether and how Obergefell applies to American Samoa, because residents born in the territory are U.S. nationals, rather than U.S. citizens as in the other four populated U.S territories. On July 9, 2015, then-attorney general for American Samoa, Talauega Eleasalo Ale, stated that his office was "still reviewing the decision to determine its [Obergefell's] applicability to American Samoa." Further, the district court judge for American Samoa, Fiti Alexander Sunia, stated in his January 2016 Senate confirmation hearing that he "will not perform weddings for same-sex couples unless local laws are changed." The legality of these statements by former and current territorial government officials remains to be addressed due to lack of litigation, making the legal status of same-sex marriage in American Samoa somewhat uncertain. In 2022, the Respect for Marriage Act established by federal law that all territories, including American Samoa, must recognize same-sex marriages performed in other states; however, this does not change anything for marriages performed in American Samoa, the status of which remains uncertain.

==== Indian reservations ====
The Court's decision did not legalize same-sex marriage on Indian reservations. In the U.S., the Congress, not the federal courts, has legal authority over tribal reservations. Thus, unless Congress passes a law regarding same-sex marriage that is applicable to tribal governments, federally recognized American Indian tribes have the legal right to form their own marriage laws, and to reject those of the U.S. As such, the individual laws of the various federally recognized Native American tribes can set limits on same-sex marriage under their jurisdictions. At least twelve reservations specifically prohibit same-sex marriage and do not recognize same-sex marriages performed in other jurisdictions, and two others may ban it; these reservations remain the only parts of the contiguous United States to enforce explicit bans on same-sex couples marrying.

== Subsequent cases ==
=== Pavan v. Smith (2017) ===
In Pavan v. Smith (2017), the Supreme Court by a 6–3 vote reaffirmed Obergefell and ruled that states may not treat married same-sex couples differently from married opposite-sex couples in issuing birth certificates. In Obergefell, birth certificates were listed among the "governmental rights, benefits, and responsibilities" that typically accompany marriage. Quoting Obergefell, the Court reaffirmed that "the Constitution entitles same-sex couples to civil marriage 'on the same terms and conditions as opposite-sex couples'."

=== Dobbs v. Jackson Women's Health Organization (2022) ===
In Dobbs v. Jackson Women's Health Organization (2022), the majority opinion overruled Roe v. Wade (1973), and held that the right to privacy does not extend to that of abortion on the criteria from Washington v. Glucksberg (1997) that a right must be "deeply rooted in the Nation's history", and abortion was considered a crime, a view that some historians argued is incomplete. For the majority, Justice Samuel Alito responded to the dissenting's concerns, saying that the ruling would not affect other substantive due process cases. In his concurring opinion, Justice Clarence Thomas, a dissenter in Obergefell, urged the court to revisit this case, since Dobbs overruled the fundamental right to privacy as unenumerated right implied in Roe and cast doubt over substantive due process. The dissenting opinion, which criticized the majority for rejecting stare decisis and overruling precedents dating back to Griswold v. Connecticut (1965), responded, "Either the majority does not really believe in its own reasoning. Or if it does, all rights that have no history stretching back to the mid-19th century are insecure. Either the mass of the majority's opinion is hypocrisy, or additional constitutional rights are under threat. It is one or the other."

=== Department of State v. Muñoz (2024) ===
In Department of State v. Muñoz (2024), the Supreme Court held that a "citizen does not have a fundamental liberty interest in her noncitizen spouse being admitted to the country." In her dissenting opinion, Justice Sotomayor criticized the majority for using the "history and tradition" test established in Washington v. Glucksberg (1997), saying that Obergefell had rejected application of the Glucksberg test to the "fundamental rights" of "marriage and intimacy".

=== Ermold v. Davis (2025) ===
In Ermold v. Davis (2025), the legal conflict centered on former Rowan County, Kentucky, Clerk Kim Davis's refusal to issue marriage licenses to same-sex couples. She was ruled to be personally liable for her refusal to issue licenses and ordered to pay $100,000 to the affected couple. Davis appealed the monetary penalty to the Sixth Circuit Court of Appeals but lost. Davis petitioned for a writ of certiorari from the U.S. Supreme Court, specifically asking it to revisit and overturn Obergefell, based on the decision from Dobbs including Thomas' concurrence. Legal experts saw Davis' petition as the first major test of Obergefell following the Dobbs decision, making it a case of high interest should the Supreme Court grant certiorari. The Supreme Court declined the petition without comment.

== Subsequent legislation ==
=== Federal ===
November 29 Senate vote by state Two yeas Yea and not voting Yea and Nay Nay and not voting Two Nays

In July 2022, the Respect for Marriage Act (RFMA) was reintroduced to Congress, with revisions including protections for interracial marriages. This was as a result of concerns over Thomas' opinion in Dobbs v. Jackson Women's Health Organization. The RFMA compels all U.S. states and territories to recognize the validity of same-sex and interracial marriages if performed in a jurisdiction where such marriages are legally performed; this extends the recognition of same-sex marriages to American Samoa. RFMA officially repealed DOMA and requires the federal government to recognize same-sex and interracial marriages, codifying parts of Obergefell, the 2013 ruling in United States v. Windsor, and the 1967 ruling in Loving v. Virginia. The Act passed the House in a bipartisan vote on July 19, 2022. Senator Tammy Baldwin of Wisconsin announced on November 14, 2022, that a bipartisan deal had been struck, and that they expected the legislation to reach 60 votes to break the filibuster. A motion of cloture passed 62–37 in the Senate on November 16. On November 29, the Senate passed it by a 61–36 vote, with a large majority of Senate nays originating from Republican Senators in the Southern United States. On December 8, the House agreed to the Senate amendment by a 258–169 vote, with one member voting present (abstention). 39 Republicans voted yea. President Biden signed the bill into law on December 13, 2022.

=== State level ===
Following the ruling, all gay marriage bans at the state level, including those in state constitutions, became invalidated and unenforceable. However, language banning such marriages still remains on the law books of many states. (Note: Statutory and Constitutional Bans: Alabama; Alaska; Arizona; Florida; Georgia; Idaho; Kansas; Kentucky; Louisiana; Michigan; Mississippi; Missouri; Montana; North Carolina; North Dakota; Ohio; Oklahoma; South Carolina; South Dakota; Tennessee; Texas; Utah; Wisconsin; Statutory Ban Only: Indiana; Iowa; Pennsylvania; West Virginia; Wyoming; Constitutional Ban Only: Nebraska; Oregon) Since Obergefell, five states have repealed language from their state constitution that had previously banned (Note: Hawaii's constitution did not explicitly ban same-sex marriage, but it granted the legislature the power to ban it.) same-sex marriage: California, Colorado, Hawaii, Nevada, and Virginia. In 2020, Nevada became the first to do so.

In some states, legislators have introduced resolutions expressing disapproval of Obergefell:

State	Year	Status	Bill Number and Link
Idaho	2025	Dead; died in committee.	House Joint Memorial 1
Michigan	2025	Live; referred to Committee on Government Operations.	House Resolution 28
Montana	2025	Dead; died in process.	Senate Joint Resolution 15
North Dakota	2025	Dead; failed to adopt during second reading.	House Concurrent Resolution 3013
South Dakota	2025	Dead; died in chamber.	House Concurrent Resolution 6012

== See also ==
- List of LGBT-related cases in the United States Supreme Court
- Goodridge v. Department of Public Health (2003), the court case that legalized same-sex marriage in Massachusetts (first state to do so in the U.S.)
- List of United States Supreme Court cases, volume 576
- Public opinion of same-sex marriage in the United States
- Timeline of same-sex marriage in the United States
